= Gérard de Villefort =

Character from the Count of Monte Cristo

- The Count of Monte Cristo character
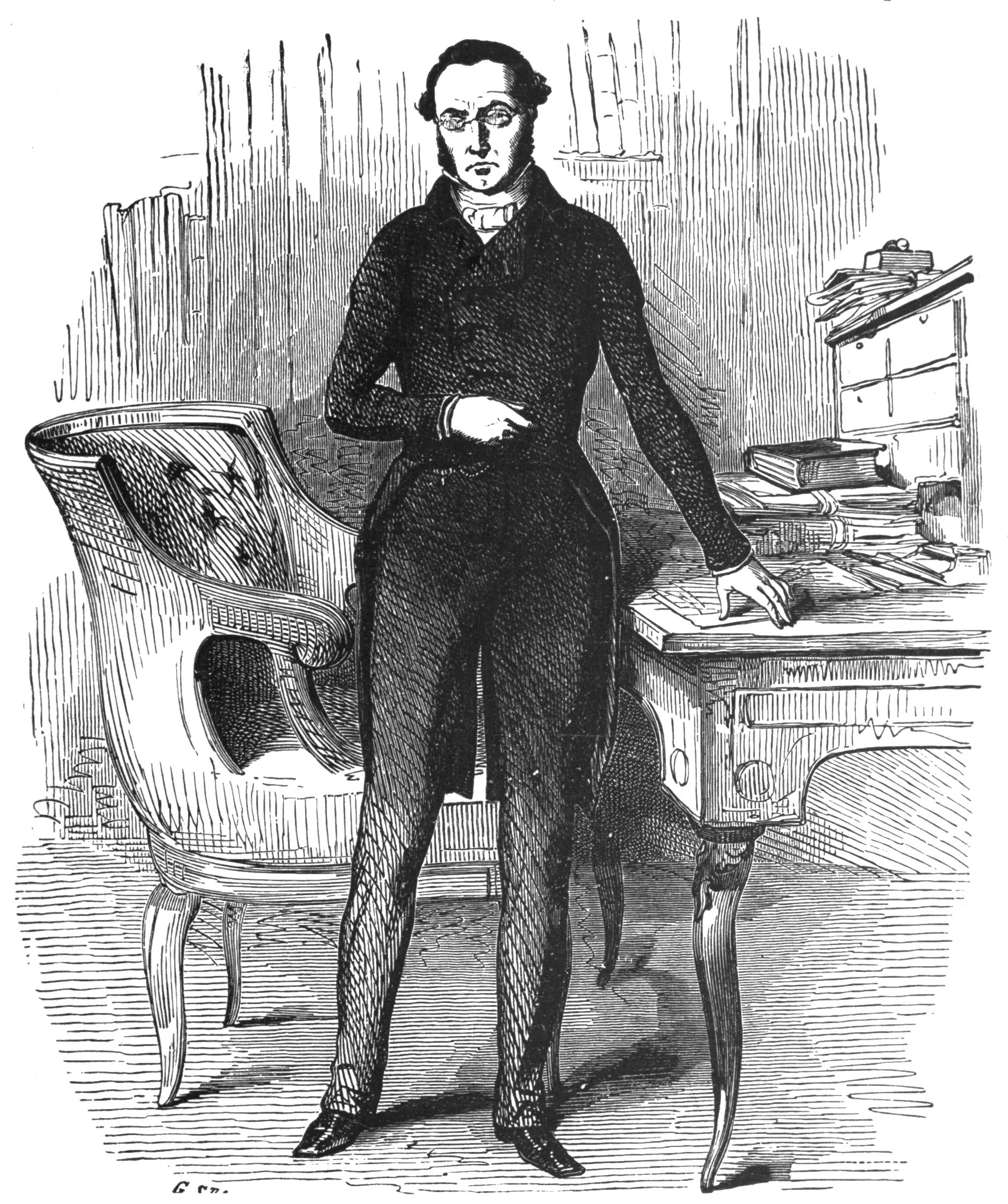
- Illustration of Villefort by Pierre-Gustave Staal (1888).
- Created by: Alexandre Dumas
- Portrayed by: Robert McKim; Jean Toulout; Louis Calhern; Miguel Arenas; Aimé Clariond; John Loder; Santiago Gómez Cou; Jacques Castelot; Bernard Dhéran; Michel Auclair; Arnis Licitis; James Frain; Laurent Lafitte; Michael Gough; Enzo Tarascio; Pierre Arditi; Mikkel Boe Følsgaard
- Voiced by: Yōsuke Akimoto; Tom Wyner; Frank Readick; Nigel Anthony; Paul Rhys

In-universe information
- Gender: Male
- Occupation: Crown Prosecutor
- Family: Noirtier de Villefort (father); Édouard de Villefort (son); Valentine de Villefort (daughter)
- Spouses: Héloïse de Villefort (2nd wife); Renée de Saint-Méran (1st wife); Hermine Danglars (mistress)
- Home: 7 Rue du Faubourg Saint-Honoré, Paris, France
- Nationality: French

Gérard de Villefort (pronounced [ʒe.ʁaʁ də vil.fɔʁ]) is a fictional character in the 1846 adventure novel The Count of Monte Cristo by Alexandre Dumas and one of the three main antagonists along with Baron Danglars and Fernand de Morcerf. He begins as an ambitious deputy crown prosecutor of Marseilles who condemns the protagonist Edmond Dantès to life imprisonment in the prison Château d'If. He commits this act to protect his own political career and conceal his father, Noirtier de Villefort's, Bonapartist affiliations. Throughout the novel, Villefort rises to the powerful position of crown prosecutor in Paris, presenting himself as a pillar of justice and the law. However, his corruption makes him a central target of Dantès's revenge plot, which culminates in the public exposure of his infidelity, the death of his family, and his ultimate descent into madness.

== Character ==
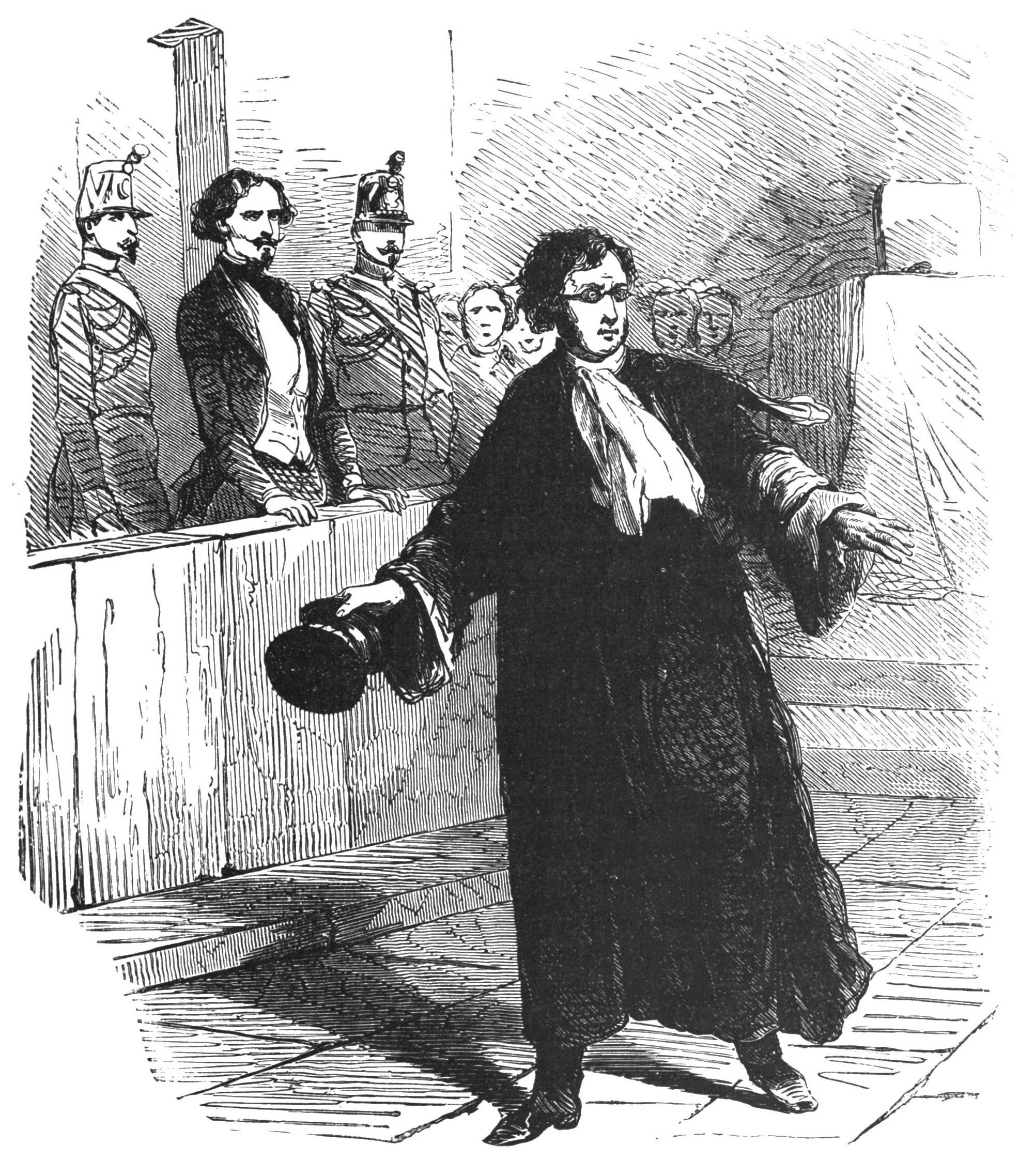
Villefort in court dress after Benedetto revealed his parentage. Illustration by unknown artist (1888).

=== Appearance ===
The twenty-seven-year-old Gérard de Villefort is described as having an olive complexion, blue eyes, and black sideburns. He maintains a rigid expression, but he is also easily stressed, where his complexion often flushes crimson or turns pale. His daily attire consists of a dark brown cutaway coat and a narrow-brimmed hat, and he carries a small bamboo collapsible walking stick.

Twenty-four years later, the fifty-year-old Villefort appears prematurely aged. His build transitions from slender to thin, and his pale complexion changes to yellow. He has hollow, deep-set eyes and wears gold-framed glasses. Dumas portrays Villefort as walking with a measured step, and his standard attire consists of black clothing with a white tie, accompanied by a red ribbon in his buttonhole. As the poisoning plotline unravels, he becomes physically emaciated and feverish by stress. After the death of his family and his insanity, his appearance is described as "haggard" and "dishevelled".

=== Personality ===
As a prosecutor, Gérard de Villefort is defined by ambition and adherence to legalism. In his private life, however, he prioritises the preservation of his career and family over anything else. He views the French legal system as a tool for political order, stating that it is sometimes necessary for the government to "cause a man's disappearance without leaving any traces". He demonstrates this when he condemns Edmond Dantès to life imprisonment.

Despite an exterior of impeccable conduct, Villefort maintains a naturally distrustful and harsh worldview, asserting that "all the world is wicked" to justify his mercilessness. This internal burden and his belief in divine retribution result in a mental breakdown after his son, Édouard, dies. During this final descent into madness, he perceives the loss of his family as the "workings of a divine hand" punishing him for his past.

== Family ==
Gérard de Villefort is the son of the Bonapartist M. Noirtier de Villefort. He distances himself from his father and his political motivations in order to advance his own career. His first marriage is to Renée de Saint-Méran, a young noblewoman and daughter of the Marquis and Marquise de Saint-Méran. In turn, they have a daughter, Valentine. Following the death of his first wife, Villefort marries Héloïse, with whom he has a son, Édouard. Villefort also has an affair with Baroness Hermine Danglars during his first marriage. This relationship results in an illegitimate son, Benedetto, whom Villefort attempts to dispose of at birth. The child is rescued by the Count of Monte Cristo's steward Bertuccio and eventually returns to Paris using the name Andrea Cavalcanti.

Marquise de Saint-Méran	Marquis de Saint-Méran	Noirtier de Villefort
Renée de Saint-Méran	Gérard de Villefort	Hëloise de Villefort	Baroness Hermine Danglars
Valéntine de Villefort	Édouard de Villefort	Benedetto

== History ==
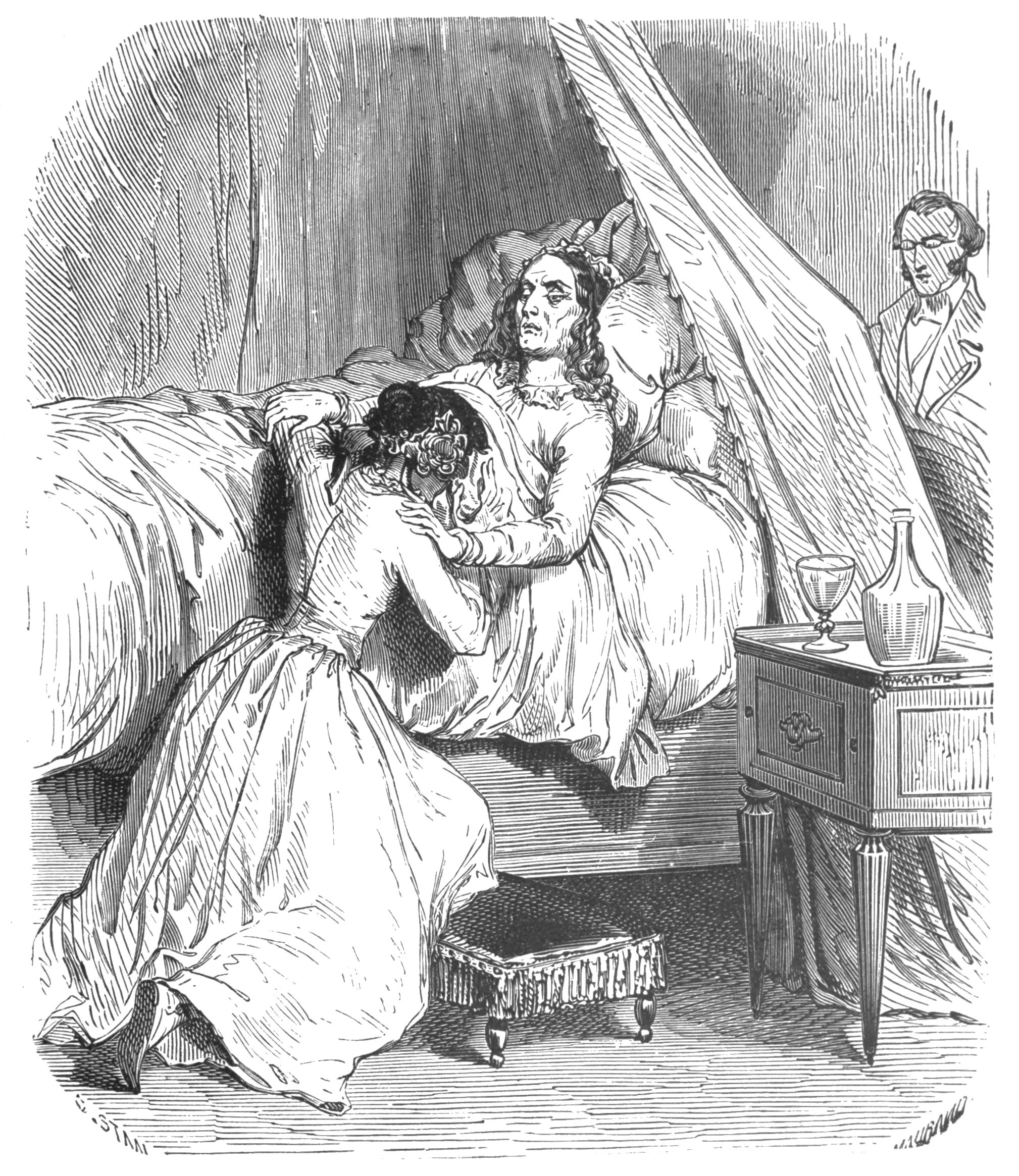
Valéntine de Villefort at the deathbed of her maternal grandmother, the Marquise de Saint-Méran. (1888)

=== Early career ===
In the beginning of the narrative, Gérard de Villefort resides in Marseille and works as the deputy crown prosecutor. He is engaged to Renée de Saint-Méran, the daughter of a royalist noble family. During his betrothal feast, he is called away to interrogate Edmond Dantès, a sailor accused of acting as a Bonapartist agent. Villefort examines Dantès and reads an evidential letter that turns out to be addressed to Noirtier de Villefort, Villefort's Bonapartist father. To protect his career prospects, Villefort burns the letter and orders Dantès to be detained in the Château d'If, an island fortress used for political prisoners.

=== Crown Prosecutor ===
Following Dantès' imprisonment, Villefort travels to Paris to inform King Louis XVIII of Napoleon's planned return from Elba, using the information from the destroyed letter. After the Hundred Days and the second restoration of the Bourbon monarchy, Villefort uses his assistance to the king to advance his career. He marries Renée de Saint-Méran, and they have a daughter named Valentine de Villefort. His father, Noirtier de Villefort, has left his life as a Bonapartist behind and is, due to a stroke fully paralysed, with the exception of his eyes. After Renée's death, he marries Héloïse, with whom he has a son, Édouard. He is appointed to the position of Crown Prosecutor in Paris, securing a place within Parisian high society.

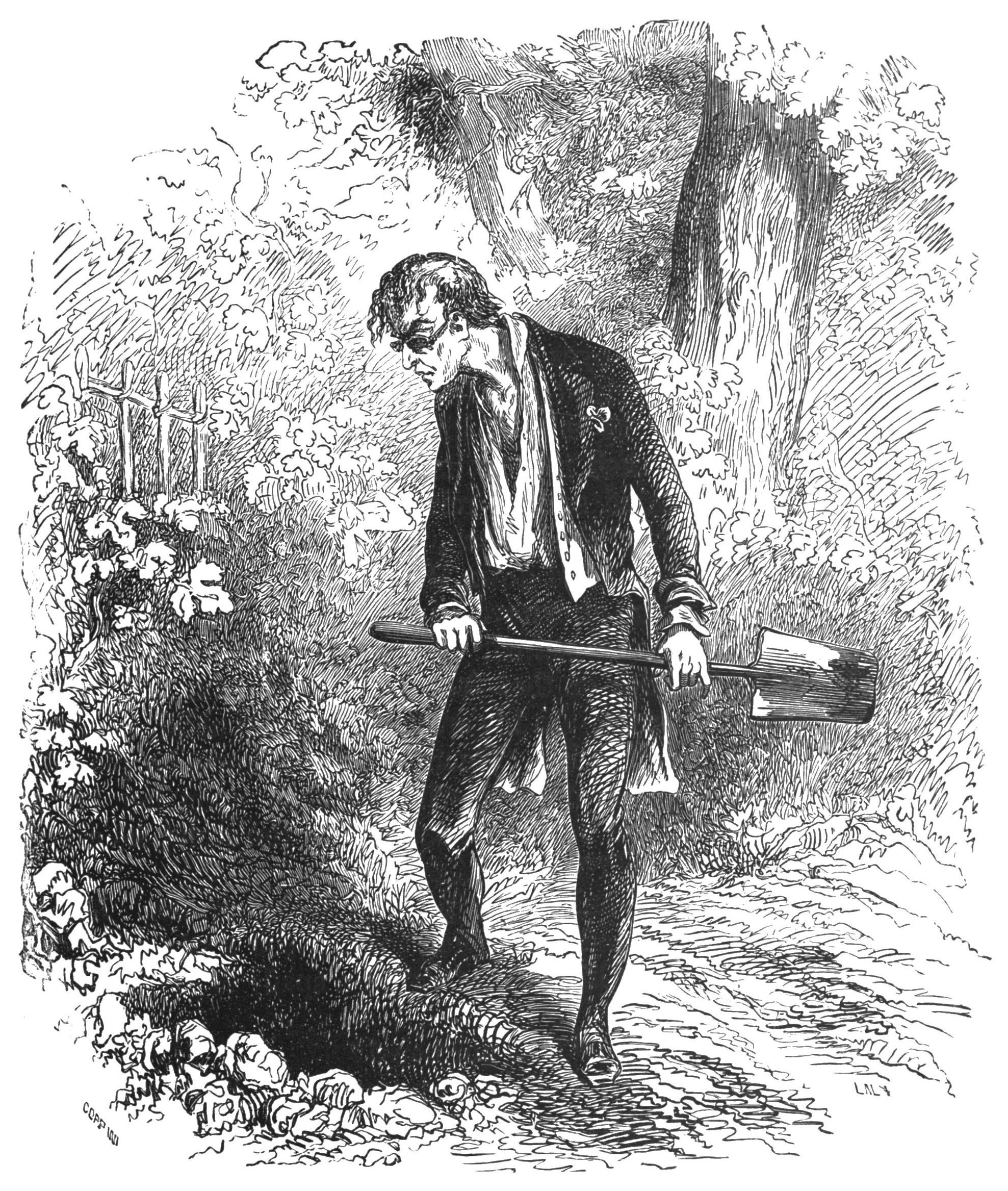
Villefort digging up his garden, looking for his dead infant son. Illustration by Pierre-Gustave Staal (1888).

=== Affair and the Count of Monte Cristo ===
Before the events of the story, Villefort engaged in an affair with Hermine Danglars, the wife of Baron Danglars. This affair resulted in the birth of a child in a house in Auteuil, Paris. Believing it to be stillborn, Villefort buried the newborn in the garden of the property. The child was retrieved and resuscitated by the smuggler Bertuccio, who had planned to kill Villefort because he refused to investigate the assassination of his brother. The child, named Benedetto, survives and begins engaging in criminal activity. After the Count of Monte Cristo makes his Paris debut, he purchases the house in Auteuil from Villefort's former father-in-law, the Marquis de Saint-Méran, and hosts a dinner party, inviting Villefort and Hermine Danglars. During the dinner, the Count recounts a story about finding the remains of a newborn in the garden, resulting in a visible reaction from Villefort and Madame Danglars.

=== Scandal and descent into madness ===
The Count of Monte Cristo introduces Benedetto, Villefort's bastard son, into Parisian society under the alias Andrea Cavalcanti, later being arrested for the murder of Gaspard Caderousse. During his trial, over which Villefort presides, Benedetto states his parentage, identifying Villefort as his father. Concurrently, Villefort's household experiences a series of poisonings. His wife, Héloïse, administers poison to members of the family to alter the flow of inheritance from their daughter Valentine and her maternal grandparents, the Marquis and Marquise de Saint-Méran, to her son Édouard. Villefort discovers her actions and gives her an ultimatum to face the legal consequences or end her life. When Villefort returns home following the trial, he finds that Héloïse has poisoned herself and Édouard. Following these events, Villefort loses his sanity.

== Depictions in other media ==
=== Films ===
Year	Actor	Role	Film
1918	Albert Mayer	Villefort	Le Comte de Monte-Cristo
1922	Robert McKim	De Villefort	Monte Cristo
1929	Jean Toulout	Monsieur de Villefort	Monte Cristo
1934	Lawrence Grant	Raymond de Villefort Jr.	The Count of Monte Cristo
1942	Miguel Arenas	Gerardo Villefort	El Conde de Montecristo
1943	Aimé Clariond	Monsieur de Villefort	Le comte de Monte Cristo, 2ème époque: Le châtiment
1953	Santiago Gómez Cou	Villefort	El Conde de Montecristo
1954	Jacques Castelot	Gérard de Villefort	Le Comte de Monte-Cristo (1ère époque): La Trahison
1961	Bernard Dhéran	Henri de Villefort	Le Comte de Monte Cristo
1968	Michel Auclair	Villefort	Sous le signe de Monte-Cristo
1975	Louis Jourdan	Villefort	The Count of Monte Cristo
1988	Arnis Licitis	Count de Villefort	Uznik zamka If
2002	James Frain	Villefort	The Count of Monte Cristo
2024	Laurent Lafitte	Gérard de Villefort	Le Comte de Monte-Cristo

=== Television ===
Year	Actor	Role	Film
1956	John Sutton	De Villefort	The Count of Monte Cristo
1964	Michael Gough	Gérard de Villefort	The Count of Monte Cristo
1966	Enzo Tarascio	Villefort	Il Conte di Montecristo
1977	Yu Yang	Wei Wenfu	Dà Bàofù
1979	Jean-Francois Poron	Comte de Villefort	Le Comte de Monte-Cristo
1984	Eduardo Gadea Perez	Manuel Antonio Lofiego	La Dueña
1998	Pierre Arditi	Gérard de Villefort	Le Comte de Monte Cristo
2004	Yōsuke Akimoto (Japanese), Tom Wyner (English)	Gérard de Villefort	Gankutsuou: The Count of Monte Cristo
2024	Mikkel Boe Følsgaard	Gérard de Villefort	The Count of Monte Cristo

=== Radio adaptions ===
Year	Actor	Role	Film
1938	Edgar Barrier	De Villefort	The Mercury Theatre on the Air
1939	Frank Readick	Villefort	The Campbell Playhouse
1987	Nigel Anthony	de Villefort	The Count of Monte Cristo

== Bibliography ==
- Dumas, Alexandre (1896). The Romances of Alexander Dumas: Count of Monte Cristo. United States, University of Illinois at Urbana-Champaign, G.D. Sproul.
- Saddleback Educational Publishing (2010). The Count of Monte Cristo Novel Study Guide. United States.
- Dumas, Alexandre (1888). The Count of Monte Cristo.
