= Baron Danglars =

Character from the Count of Monte Cristo

- The Count of Monte Cristo character
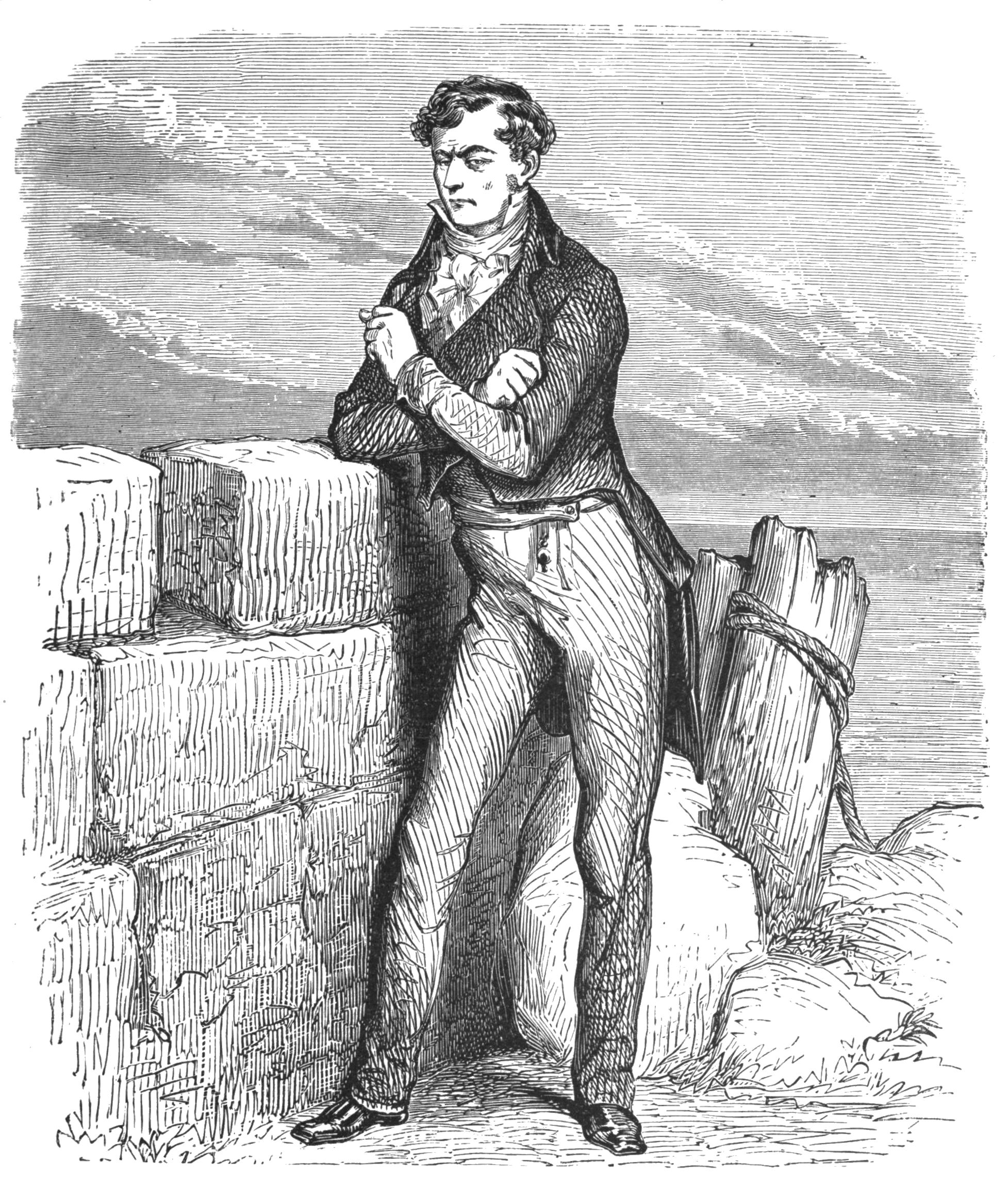
- Print of a young Danglars by printmaker Octave Jahyer, after illustration by Pierre-Gustave Staal (1888).
- Created by: Alexandre Dumas
- Portrayed by: Murdock MacQuarrie; Albert Prisco; Raymond Walburn; Carlos López Moctezuma; Charles Dingle; Nathán Pinzón; Donald Pleasence; Aleksei Zharkov; Albie Woodington; Patrick Mille; Morris Perry; Achille Millo; Michel Aumont
- Voiced by: Shinpachi Tsuji; Doug Stone; Toby Jones

In-universe information
- Gender: Male
- Occupation: Banker
- Spouse: Hermine Danglars
- Children: Eugénie Danglars
- Home: 7 Rue de la Chaussee d'Antin, Paris, France
- Nationality: French

Baron Danglars (pronounced [ba-ʁɔ̃ dɑ̃.ɡlaʁ]) is a fictional character in the 1844 adventure novel The Count of Monte Cristo by Alexandre Dumas, and one of the three main antagonists alongside Gérard de Villefort and Fernand de Morcerf. He begins the story as the supercargo of the merchant ship Pharaon, along with its first mate Edmond Dantès. Motivated by jealousy over Dantès's promotion to captain, Danglars writes the letter that accuses Dantès of Bonapartism, leading directly to his imprisonment in the Château d'If.

Following Dantès's arrest, Danglars moves to Paris, where he builds a fortune as a banker and acquires a barony. As the instigator of the conspiracy to put him in prison, Danglars serves as a central target of Dantès's revenge plot. The Count of Monte Cristo manipulates the financial markets to cause the collapse of Danglars's bank, resulting in his bankruptcy. After fleeing the country with the remainder of his embezzled funds, Danglars is captured by bandits in Italy and forced to surrender his remaining money in exchange for food, surviving unharmed but impoverished.

== Character ==
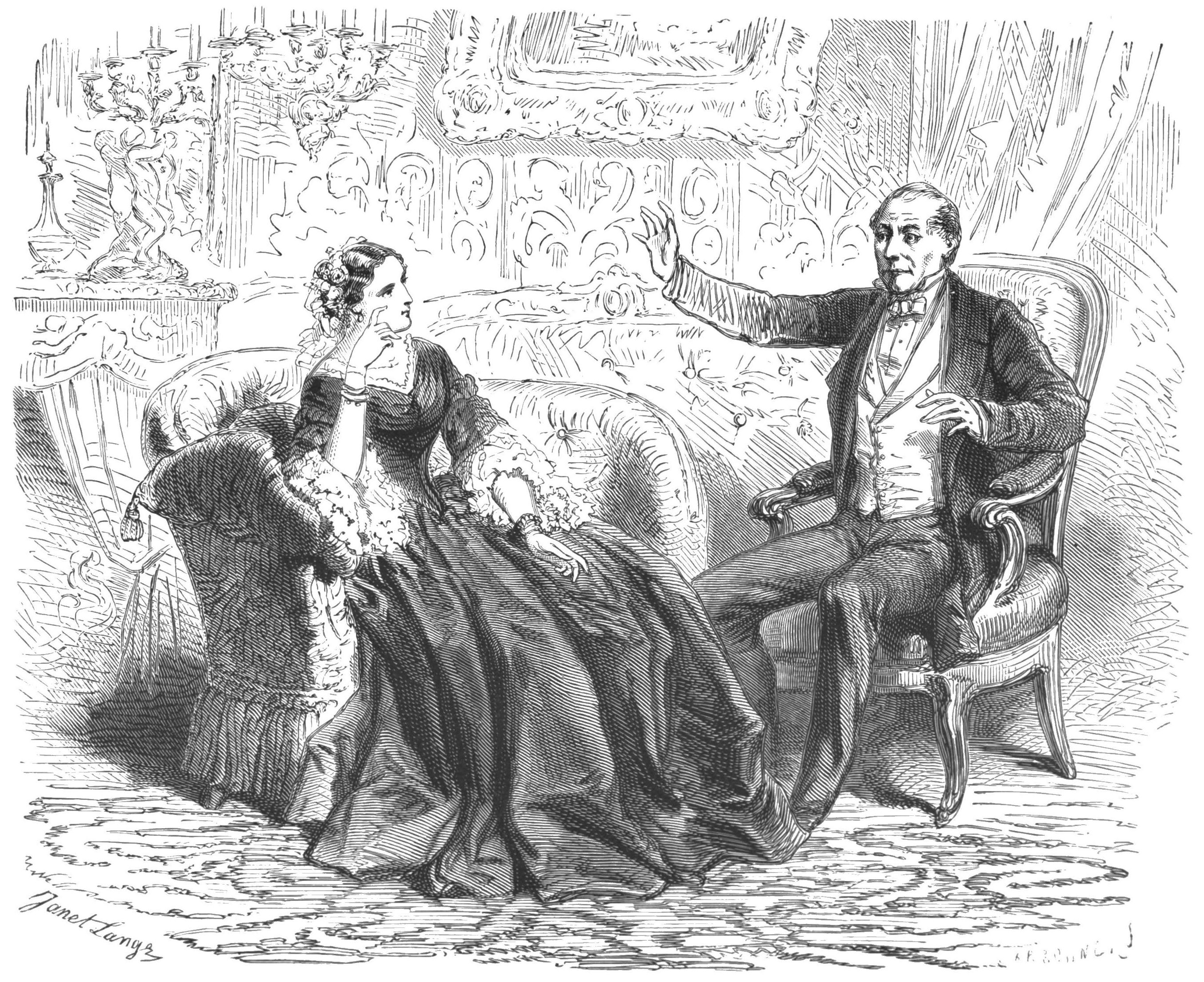
Danglars with his daughter, Eugénie. Unknown illustrator (1888).

=== Appearance ===
In 1815, Dumas describes Danglars as a man of twenty-five or twenty-six years, with a heavy build and a "sly" face. His eyes are deep-set and restless. Twenty years later, as a Parisian banker, he appears nearly fifty with a greyish complexion and stiff movements. He typically wears formal attire, with a black coat and white cravat. After his capture by Luigi Vampa, his hair turns white from starvation and stress.

=== Personality ===
Danglars prioritises financial gain and social advancement over moral considerations. His jealousy toward those more successful than him leads him to orchestrate the denunciation of Edmond Dantès. Unlike the other conspirators, he shows little remorse, viewing personal and professional relationships as transactional assets. His primary trait is a commitment to self-preservation.

== History ==
=== Early career ===
In the beginning of the novel, Danglars is employed as the supercargo aboard the merchant ship the Pharaon, owned by Pierre Morrel. He is very jealous of the success ascertained by the ship's 19-year-old first mate, Edmond Dantès, whom Monsieur Morell is planning to promote to captain following the unexpected death of Captain Leclère.

During a stopover at the island of Elba, Dantès receives a letter from the exiled Emperor Napoléon Bonaparte, after fulfilling Leclère's final wish. Seeking to prevent Dantès's promotion, Danglars devises a plot to eliminate him. At the tavern Le Réserve in Marseille, accompanied by the tailor Gaspard Caderousse and Fernand Mondego, a fisherman jealous of Dantès's engagement to his cousin Mercédès, Danglars drafts an anonymous letter to the crown prosecutor, Gérard de Villefort, falsely incriminating Dantès as a Bonapartist agent. This accusation leads to Dantès's arrest during his engagement feast and his subsequent indefinite imprisonment in the Château d'If.

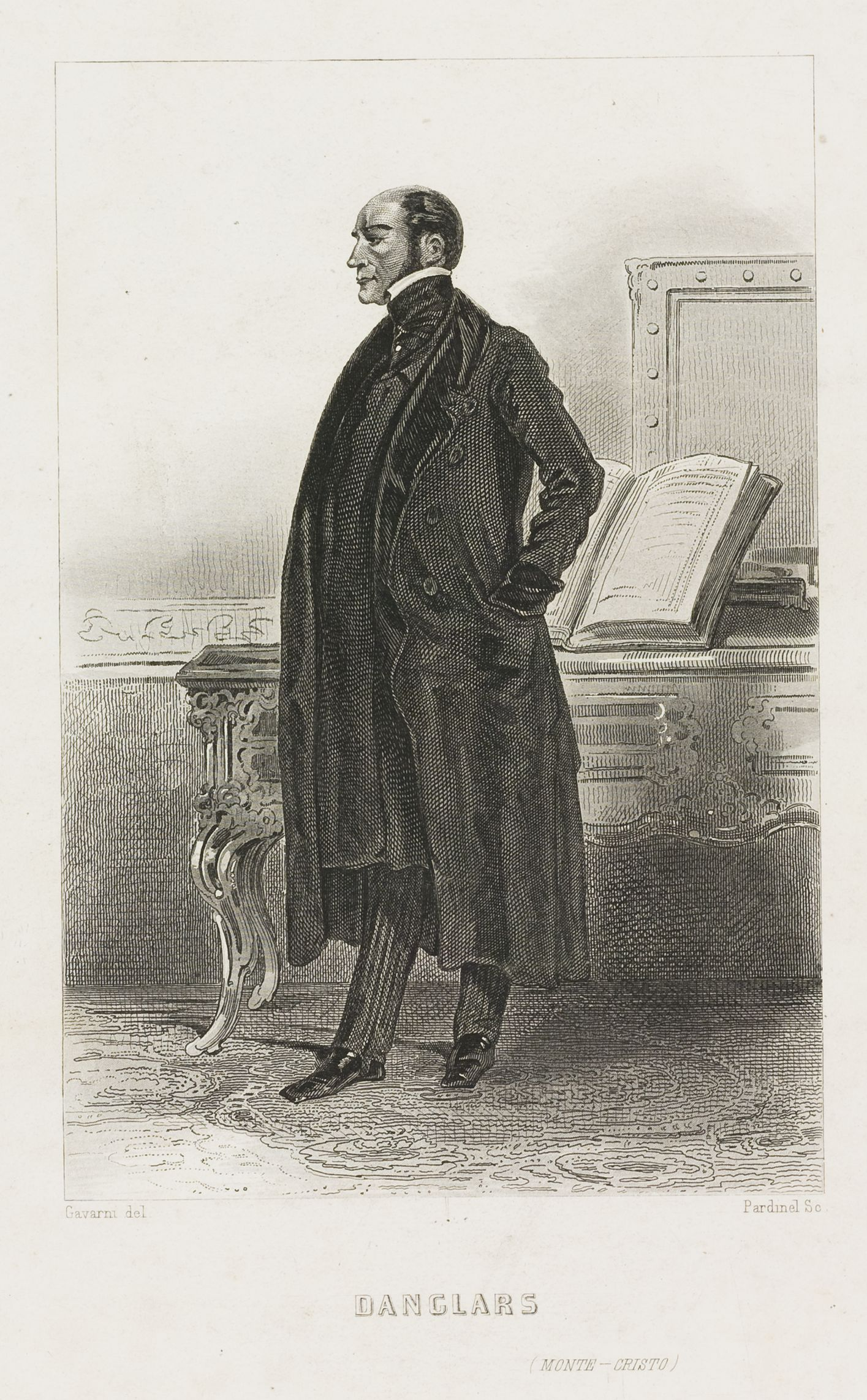
Danglars after his relocation to Paris. Illustration by Paul Gavarni.

=== Rise to prominence ===
Following Dantès's arrest and fearing political repercussions during the Hundred Days, Danglars resigns from his position on the Pharaon and moves to Madrid, Spain, where he begins working for a Spanish merchant. He eventually moves to Paris where he establishes himself as a rich and powerful banker. Through financial speculation, particularly by supplying the French army during military campaigns and by utilising insider information from his wife's lover, the secretary to the Minister of the Interior Lucien Debray, he accumulates a vast fortune. His success earns him the title of Baron from the French government. He subsequently marries Hermine de Nargonne, an aristocratic widow, which solidifies his standing in Parisian high society. Together they move to 7 Rue de la Chaussee d'Antin and have a daughter named Eugénie Danglars. Initially unbeknownst to Danglars, his wife previously engaged in a secret affair with the crown prosecutor Gérard de Villefort, resulting in an illegitimate child, named Benedetto.

=== The Count of Monte Cristo and financial ruin ===
Years later, Edmond Dantès, having escaped prison and acquired a vast fortune, arrives in Paris under the persona of the Count of Monte Cristo. The Count opens his line of credit with Danglars's bank, demanding infinite drawing capacity The Count dismantles Danglars' financial empire through market manipulation. He bribes a telegraph operator to transmit a false report regarding the political situation in Spain. Relying on this insider information, Danglars sells all of his Spanish bonds, facing devastating financial losses when the news is proven false. The Count makes the crisis worse by causing the bankruptcy of Danglars's key debtors while demanding massive cash withdrawals from his own line of credit.

To avoid bankruptcy, Danglars attempts to arrange a lucrative marriage between his daughter Eugénie Danglars and Andrea Cavalcanti, whom he believes to be a wealthy Italian nobleman. However, during the signing of the marriage contract, Cavalcanti is exposed as Benedetto, an escaped convict and the illegitimate son of Gérard de Villefort and Hermine Danglars, resulting in a public scandal that destroys Danglars' remaining status.

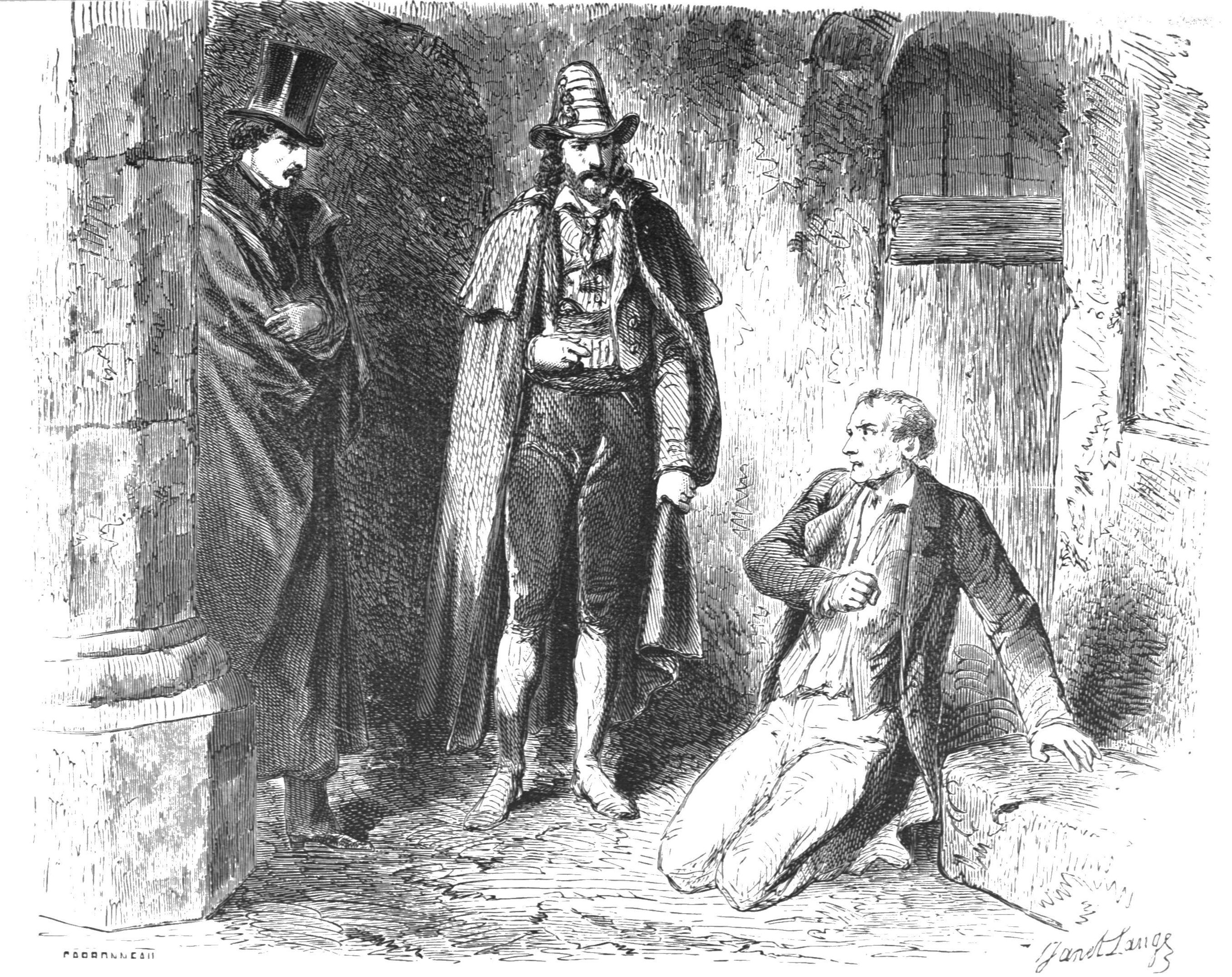
The Count of Monte Cristo revealing his true identity to an emaciated Danglars.

=== Flight and capture ===
Facing financial ruin and the collapse of his family, Danglars embezzles five million francs intended for the hospital treasury and flees from France to Italy. When he arrives in Rome, he cashes his stolen receipts at the firm of Thomson and French. Shortly after leaving the city, his carriage is intercepted by the Italian bandit Luigi Vampa and his men, who are secretly following the orders of the Count of Monte Cristo.

Danglars is imprisoned in the catacombs of San Sebastian. Vampa tells him that he will not be harmed, but he must purchase his own food and water at very high rates, such as 100,000 francs for a single meal. Over several days, Danglars is systematically extorted of his stolen millions until he is left with only 50,000 francs and very emaciated. When he begs to be released, the Count of Monte Cristo appears and reveals his true identity as Edmond Dantès. Having already witnessed the unintended deaths of Villefort's family, Dantès chooses to pardon Danglars, allowing him to keep his life and remaining funds. Danglars is released on the side of a road; when he stops to drink from a stream, he discovers that the stress of the ordeal has turned his hair completely white overnight.

== Depictions in other media ==
=== Films ===
Year	Actor	Role	Film
1918	Alexandre Colas	Baron Danglars	Le Comte de Monte Cristo
1922	Albert Prisco	Baron Danglars	Monte Cristo
1934	Raymond Walburn	Danglars	The Count of Monte Cristo
1942	Carlos López Moctezuma	Baron Danglars	El Conde de Montecristo
1953	Nathán Pinzón	Danglars	El Conde de Montecristo
1975	Donald Pleasence	Danglars	The Count of Monte Cristo
1988	Aleksei Zharkov	Danglars	Uznik zamka If
2002	Albie Woodington	Danglars	The Count of Monte Cristo
2024	Patrick Mille	Danglars	Le Comte de Monte-Cristo

=== Television ===
Year	Actor	Role	Film
1956	John Loder	Danglers	The Count of Monte Cristo
1964	Morris Perry	Baron Danglars	The Count of Monte Cristo
1966	Enzo Tarascio	Villefort	Il Conte di Montecristo
1977	Yu Yang	Wei Wenfu	Dà Bàofù
1998	Michel Aumont	Danglars	Le Comte de Monte Cristo
2004	Shinpachi Tsuji (Japanese), Doug Stone (English)	Jullian Danglars	Gankutsuou: The Count of Monte Cristo
2024	Blake Ritson	Danglars	The Count of Monte Cristo

=== Radio adaptions ===
Year	Actor	Role	Film
1939	George Coulouris	Danglars	The Campbell Playhouse
2012	Toby Jones	Baron Danglars	The Count of Monte Cristo

== Bibliography ==
- Dumas, Alexandre (1896). The Romances of Alexander Dumas: Count of Monte Cristo. United States, University of Illinois at Urbana-Champaign, G.D. Sproul.
- Saddleback Educational Publishing (2010). The Count of Monte Cristo Novel Study Guide. United States.
- Dumas, Alexandre (1888). The Count of Monte Cristo.
