= The Stars' Tennis Balls =

Novel by Stephen Fry

- Author: Stephen Fry
- Cover artist: Artist Partners
- Language: English
- Genre: Thriller, Novel
- Publisher: Hutchinson
- Publication date: 29 September 2000
- Publication place: United Kingdom
- Media type: Print (hardback & paperback)
- Pages: 388 pp (Hardcover edition); 371 pp (Paperback edition)
- ISBN: 0-09-180151-6 (Hardcover edition); ISBN 0-09-179388-2 (Paperback edition)
- OCLC: 45886322

The Stars' Tennis Balls is a psychological thriller novel by Stephen Fry, first published in 2000. In the United States, the title was changed to Revenge. The story is a modern adaptation of Alexandre Dumas's 1844 novel The Count of Monte Cristo, which was in turn based on a contemporary legend.

The original title comes from a quotation taken from John Webster's The Duchess of Malfi, which reads: "We are merely the stars' tennis balls, struck and bandied which way please them."

== Plot summary ==
In 1980, Ned (Edward) Maddstone is a seventeen-year-old student, the sort of person for whom everything goes right. He is head boy, talented at sports, and following in the footsteps of his father towards Oxford University and a career in politics. A school friend, Ashley Barson-Garland, discovers that Maddstone read part of his diary and knows that Ashley is ashamed of his working-class roots. Barson-Garland plots to tarnish Maddstone's character with an arrest for drug possession. He enlists Rufus Cade, who is jealous of Maddstone's good looks and popularity, and Gordon Fendeman, the Jewish-American cousin of Portia, the object of Maddstone's affection with whom Fendeman is also in love (Fendeman also agrees with Portia's non-practising Jewish parents that she should not marry outside the faith).

When Maddstone is arrested, an envelope from his dying sailing instructor is discovered in his pocket. It is a coded message from the Irish Republican Army. Maddstone is whisked away from the police station by a smooth Secret Services operative called Oliver Delft, who listens calmly to Maddstone's explanation of events until he learns that the envelope was to be delivered to the home of Delft's mother. Wanting to cover-up his hidden familial relationship to a Fenian traitor, Delft decides that Maddstone must disappear. Maddstone is beaten up, pumped full of drugs, and taken away to a remote lunatic asylum off the coast of Sweden. For years he is programmed by the resident psychiatrist, Dr. Mallo, to believe that his memories of his former life are delusional. After several years, Maddstone starts to believe Mallo's mental programming. Mallo deems him "well enough" to fraternise with other inmates, and Maddstone begins to talk to Babe, a fellow Englishman. Babe informs Maddstone that he has not been in the asylum for three or four years as he believed, but he has in fact been there a whole decade. Maddstone is in shock, but he and Babe subsequently talk every day.

The two men become close friends. Over the course of another decade, Babe educates Maddstone, helping him to master chess and teaching him to speak multiple languages, among other things. Eventually Maddstone breaks Mallo's programming completely and regains his memory. With Babe's help, he determines who betrayed him and how, although he is still baffled by their motives. When Ned mentions the name of Oliver Delft, Babe, who has eidetic memory, remembers a list of IRA sympathisers that he once saw, which gives Ned another clue to the conspiracy. Several weeks later, Babe dies of a heart attack. He leaves Maddstone instructions detailing how to escape by hiding in Babe's coffin. Once free, he trades some prescription drugs (stolen from the asylum) to a dealer in Hamburg in exchange for a German passport. Following Babe's instructions, Ned travels to a Swiss bank. He gains access to Babe's account, in which Babe had deposited large sums of stolen money. The money has been accruing interest during Babe's imprisonment; the balance is over £324 million.

Now fabulously wealthy, Ned assumes the identity of Simon Cotter, a famous and mysterious Internet entrepreneur who makes huge profits investing in high-risk ventures. He returns to England to begin his revenge. He arranges for the thugs who beat him, now in prison themselves, to be beaten, humiliated and robbed of all privilege and power. Albert Fendeman, the seventeen-year-old son of Gordon and Portia, starts to work for Cotter, and becomes a personal acquaintance.

Maddstone targets Rufus Cade, survivor of several failed marriages and a regular drugs user. Due to Ned's intervention, Cade mistakenly sells sherbet instead of cocaine to a group of Turkish drug dealers. Moments after Ned reveals his true identity to Cade and his intent to destroy him, Cade is brutally mutilated by the dealers. Maddstone allows him to bleed to death over the course of an hour.

Ashley Barson-Garland is now a backbench Member of Parliament, a rising star in the Conservative Party known for his vocal stance on Internet censorship and the preservation of family values. On a broadcast of Barson-Garland's television programme, Threat of the Net, Maddstone's ally, a young woman who facilitated his Hamburg drug deal, reveals evidence that Barson-Garland is deeply involved in child pornography. Fleeing the television studio during the show, Barson-Garland receives a trojan worm from Maddstone that reveals Ned's true identity and intent as it floods his hard drive with pornographic videos of under-age boys. As the police arrive, Barson-Garland kills himself.

Oliver Delft, no longer with the Intelligence Service, accepts a job from Cotter. Maddstone secretly reveals his identity to Delft's mother, who is paralysed and mute due to a stroke, and describes what he suffered on her account and his intent to utterly destroy her son. Maddstone believes she will be tortured by being unable to warn her son, but instead (although he does not know) she is ecstatic that her son is going to suffer for the years of torment he put her through after discovering her secret.

Maddstone discovers that Gordon Fendeman was involved in a swindle in South Africa five years previously, that left an entire African tribe homeless, landless, and mired in poverty and starvation. Cotter reveals this information to the press. Albert, angered by this personal attack on his father, attempts to discredit Cotter. While showing Portia a mocking website he has made about Cotter, Albert unknowingly reveals Cotter's true identity to her. Maddstone replies to Albert's attack on him by infecting his computer with a virus. Portia visits Maddstone in his office and convinces him to make peace with Albert.

Gordon Fendeman is offered a deal by his board of directors that will allow him to resign without disgrace. Cotter, having become the chairman of the board just that morning, attends the meeting with the princess of the tribe that Fendeman double-crossed in Africa. The princess relays the tribe's view of events, and claims that when she was thirteen Fendeman raped her. Fendeman tries to kill himself, but dies of a heart attack on the boardroom floor.

Maddstone has Delft beaten, and threatens to have him drugged, and flown to the asylum in Sweden. He offers Delft a choice: he can spend the rest of his life in the asylum, or commit suicide by swallowing hot coals. Delft chooses the latter and dies a gruesome death. Maddstone shoots the men who served as Delft's lackeys on the day that he was arrested, completing his revenge.

Maddstone goes to the Fendeman house hoping to resume his relationship with Portia, but finds only Portia's father, who informs Maddstone that Portia and Albert have fled to an unknown location to mourn Gordon. Left on the kitchen table are the love letters that Portia and Maddstone exchanged as teenagers. Maddstone takes them, realizing that he will never find Portia and Albert.

Maddstone tears up the love letters and scatters them at sea. He returns to what he now realises is his only real "home": the asylum, which he now owns.

== Character allusions/references ==
In the novel's afterword, Fry states he tried to make his novel appear more of a conscious homage by changing the characters' names to anagrams or references to Dumas' original work:

Monte Cristo	Stars' Tennis Balls	Notes
Edmond Dantès	Ned Maddstone	anagram
Mercedes	Portia	pun: Mercedes-Benz → Porsche
de Villefort	Oliver Delft	anagram
the Abbe (Faria)	the Babe (Fraser)	partial anagram
Fernand Mondego	Gordon Fendeman	anagram
Noirtier	Blackrow	translated literally (calque)
Capt. Leclere	Paddy Leclare	homonym
Pharaon (Leclere's ship)	Orphana (yacht)	anagram
Caderousse	Rufus Cade	translation: rousse = red = Rufus
Baron Danglars	Barson-Garland	anagram
Monte Cristo	Simon Cotter	anagram
Albert de Morcerf	Albert Fendeman	same first name

== Reception ==
Reviews of the book were positive. Jane Shilling declared in The Times "This is an odd, interesting, ambitious book with a complex pedigree" and Harry Mount wrote of Fry in the Daily Telegraph "He seems to be concentrating more on producing a taut thriller. This he does to good effect, adding a talent for terror and suspense-writing to his quiverful of skills". However, Stephen Moss, writing in the Guardian opined that it was a "good read rather than great book, pacy, well constructed and rather gruesome. If one were to make a criticism, one might say that it was a trifle banausian. It works like clockwork, but one does not buy a novel to tell the time."

== See also ==
- The Stars My Destination by Alfred Bester, another novel that takes its plot from The Count of Monte Cristo.
