= Fernand de Morcerf =

Fernand Mondego, Count de Morcerf
- The Count of Monte Cristo character
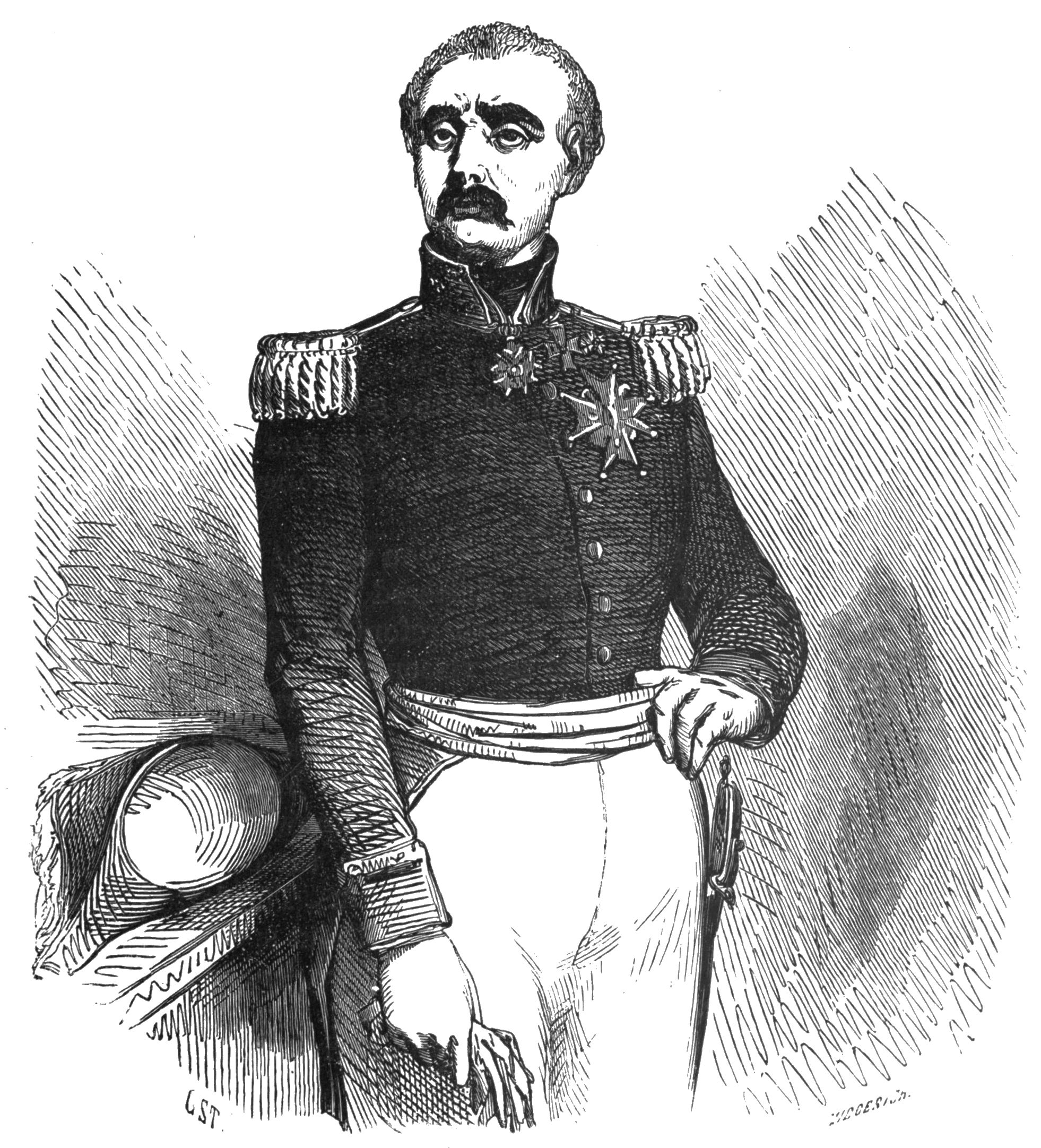
- Illustration of Fernand by Pierre-Gustave Staal (1888)
- Created by: Alexandre Dumas
- Portrayed by: Jean Garat; Ralph Cloninger; Gaston Modot; Sidney Blackmer; René Cardona; Henri Bosc; Ernesto Bianco; Roger Pigaut; Jean-Claude Michel; Raymond Pellegrin; Tony Curtis; Mikhail Boyarsk; Guy Pearce; Bastien Bouillon; Noel Willman; Philip Madoc; Alberto Terrani; Huang Zhisen; Manuel Tejada; Jean Rochefort; Harry Taurasi
- Voiced by: Jūrōta Kosugi; Paul St. Peter; Sidney Smith; Edgar Barrier

In-universe information
- Title: Count
- Occupation: Fisherman (formerly); Military Officer; Politician
- Family: Albert de Morcerf (son)
- Spouse: Mercédès de Morcerf (née Herrera)
- Home: 27 Rue du Helder, Paris, France

Fernand Mondego (later Count de Morcerf; pronounced [fɛʁ.nɑ̃ mɔ̃.de.ɡo, kɔ̃t də mɔʁ.sɛʁf]) is a fictional character in the 1844 adventure novel The Count of Monte Cristo by Alexandre Dumas, and one of the three main antagonists alongside Baron Danglars and Gérard de Villefort. He is, at the beginning of the novel, a Catalan fisherman in Marseilles who is in love with his cousin, Mercédès Herrera. Due to his jealousy over her engagement to the protagonist Edmond Dantès, Fernand mails the accusation letter that leads to his imprisonment in the Château d'If.

After Dantès is incarcerated in the Château d'If, Fernand marries Mercédès and embarks on a military career, serving as a military officer under the Albanian ruler Ali Pasha among other things. He moves to Paris, where he acquires a fortune, the rank of general, and the title of Count de Morcerf, largely through his betrayal and murder of his former employer Ali Pasha. The Count of Monte Cristo causes the unmasking of Fernand's war crimes and treason through the testimony of Ali Pasha's daughter, Haydée, which results in his social ruin, the desertion of his family, and his ultimate suicide.

== Character ==
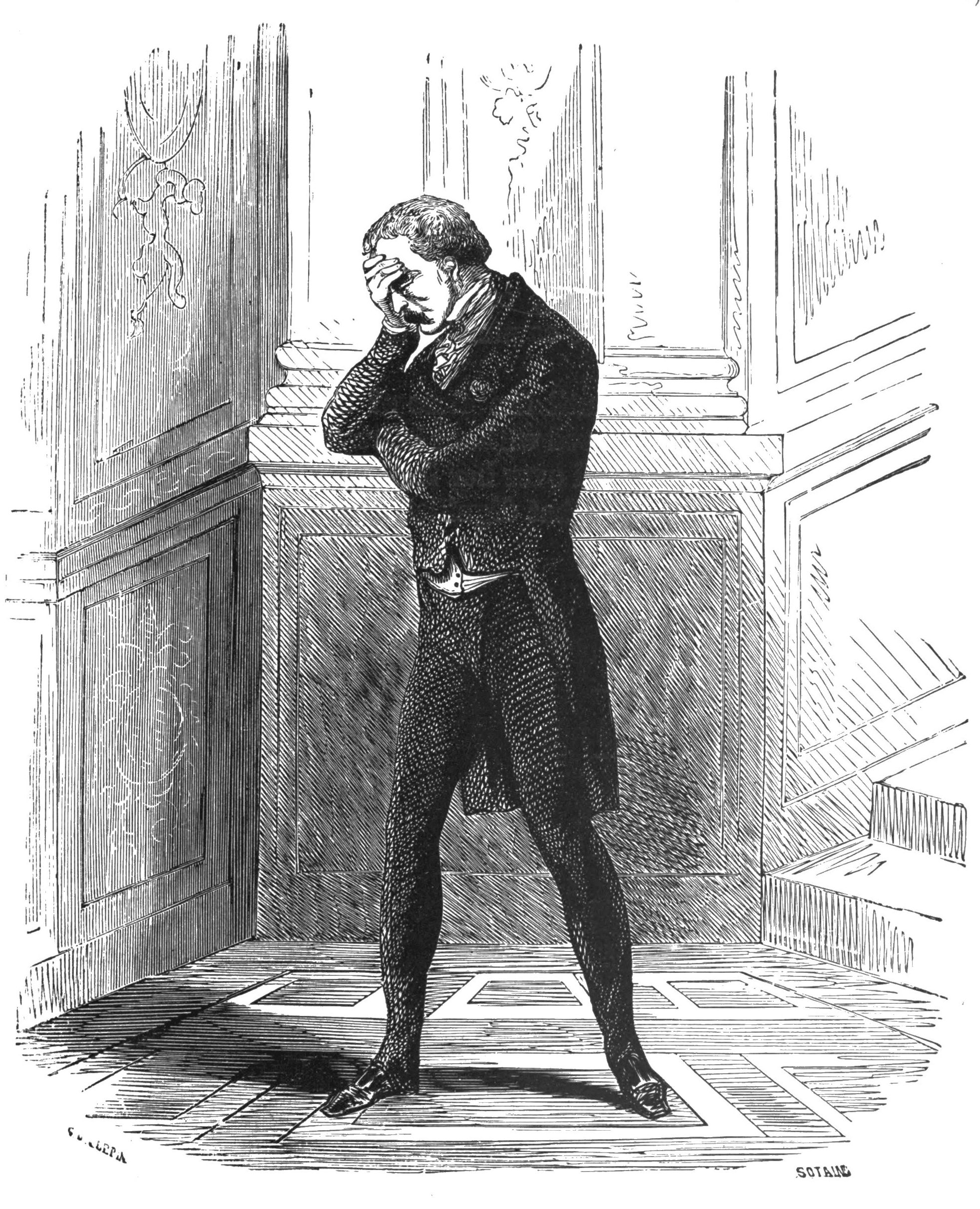
Fernand Mondego, Count de Morcerf, after the revelation of his betrayal. Engraving by Noël-Eugène Sotain (1888)

=== Appearance ===
In 1815, Dumas describes Mondego as a young man of twenty to twenty-two years of age who generally wears traditional Catalan clothing. He is described as having an "athletic" build; Danglars notes that Fernand has "fists that would crush the skull of an ox."

Upon his elevation to the peerage as the Count of Morcerf, Fernand Mondego is described as being between forty and forty-five years of age, but bearing the physical characteristics of a man of at least fifty. His black moustache and eyebrows stand in contrast to his greying hair, cut in a military manner. His complexion is pale, with a strained expression. He typically wears the formal uniform of a lieutenant-general adorned with the grand cross of the Legion of Honour along with the ribbons of various other orders he is part of.

=== Personality ===
Mondego is characterised by an intense jealousy. His unrequited love for his cousin, Mercédès Herrera, motivates his participation in the conspiracy against Edmond Dantès. His career is built upon further acts of treachery, most notably his betrayal of Ali Pasha in Yanina, prioritising wealth and status over loyalty. Despite his illustrious career and rise to French nobility, he remains haunted by the possibility of his past being revealed, along with a general dissatisfaction with his life. These facts gets exploited by the Count of Monte Cristo to motivate him to take his own life.

== History ==
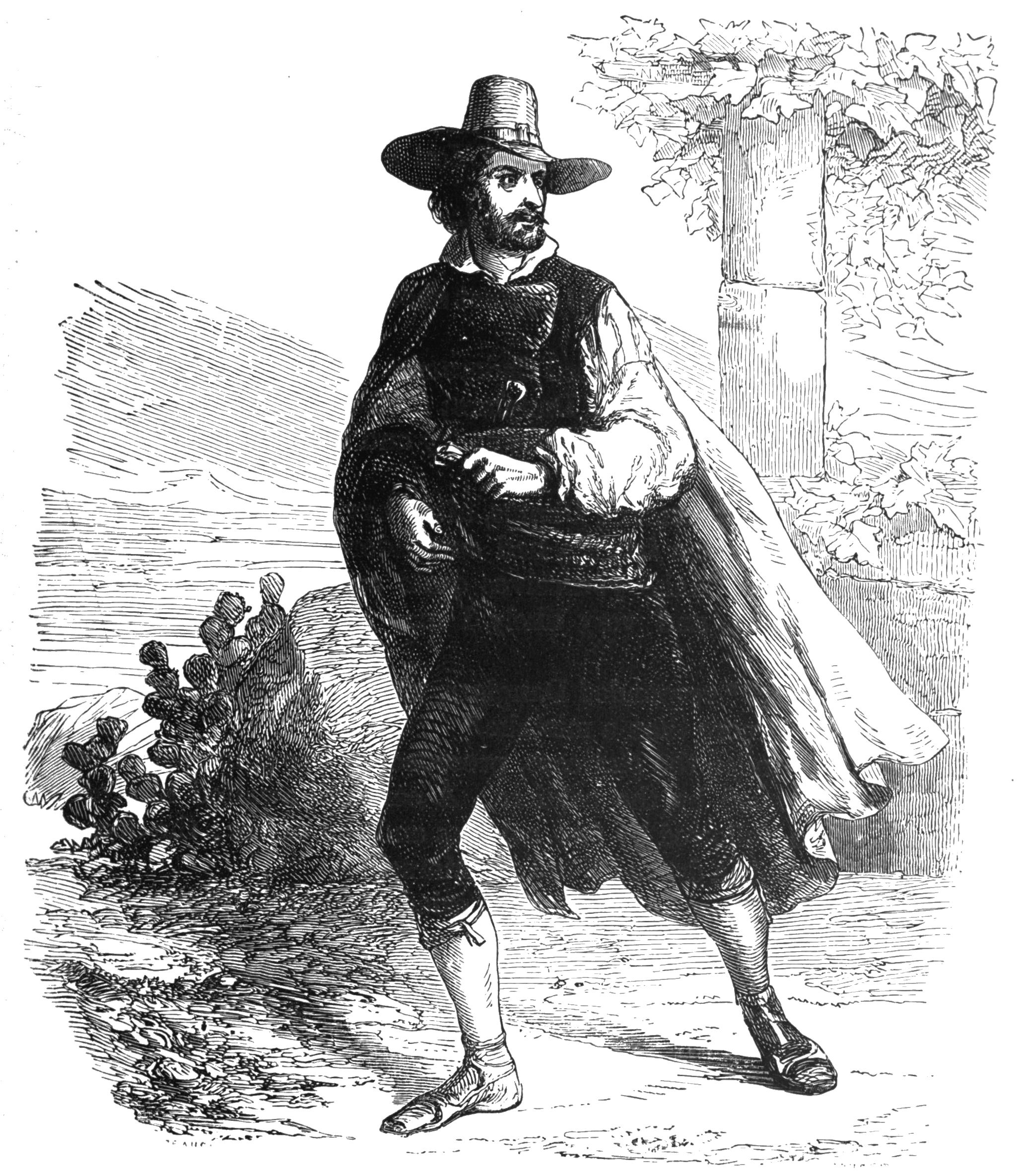
A young Fernand Mondego, illustration by Pierre-Gustave Staal (1888)

=== Early life ===
At the beginning of the book, Fernand Mondego is introduced as a Catalan fisherman living in the outskirts of Marseille. He is in love with his cousin, Mercédès Herrera, who rejects his advances due to her engagement to the sailor Edmond Dantès. Driven by jealousy over their relationship, Fernand meets with the supercargo of Dantès' ship, Danglars, and the tailor Gaspard Caderousse at a local tavern, La Réserve. At the tavern, Danglars drafts an anonymous letter to the authorities accusing Dantès of being a Bonapartist agent. Fernand takes the letter and delivers it to the deputy crown prosecutor, Gérard de Villefort. This accusation directly leads to Dantès's arrest and imprisonment in the Château d'If.

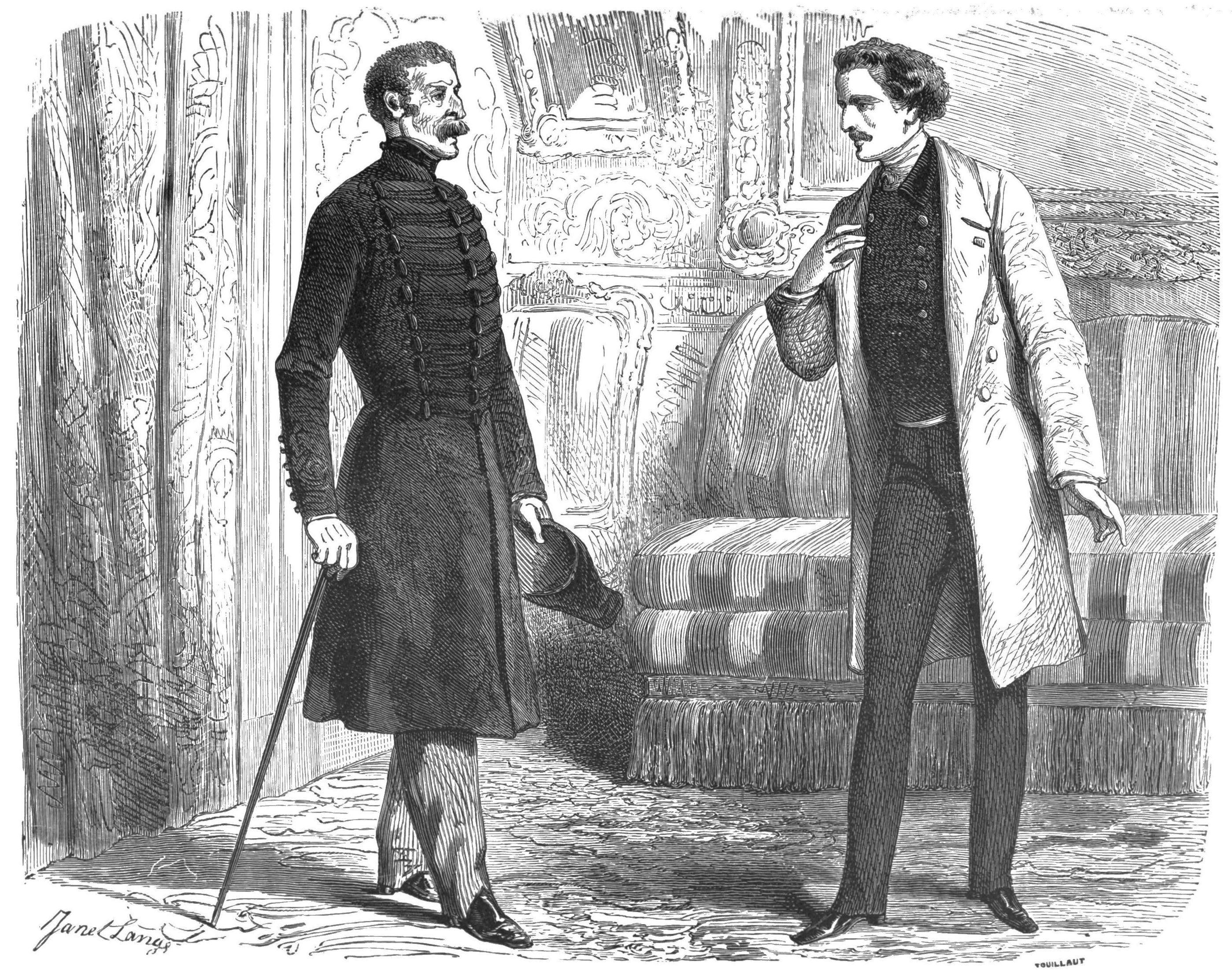

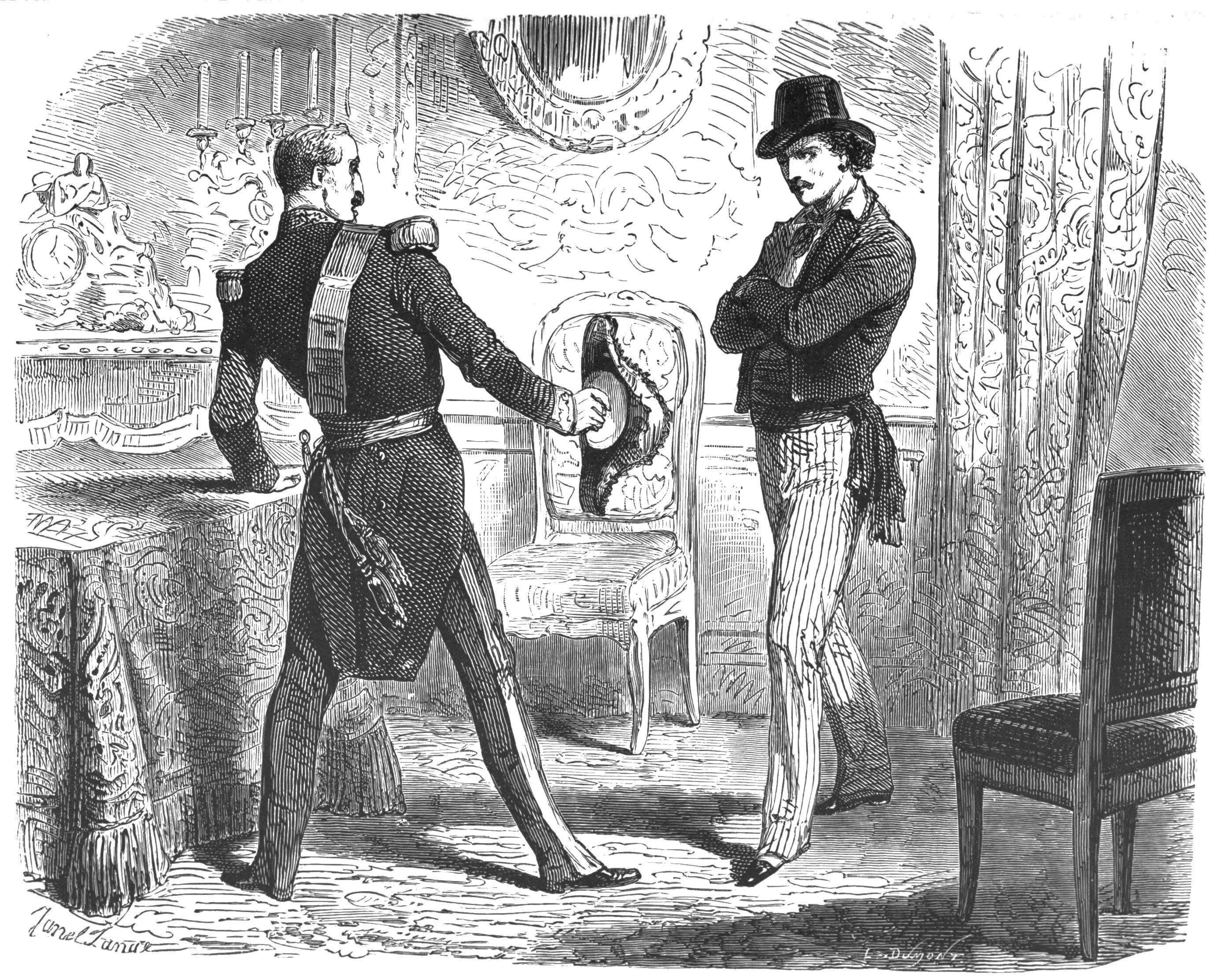
The Count of Morcerf challenging the Count of Monte Cristo to a duel to restore his honour, and the Count of Monte Cristo subsequently revealing himself to be Edmond Dantés. Both illustrations by Ange-Louis Janet (1888)

=== Military service ===
After Dantès is arrested, Fernand is conscripted into the French military. While he is away, Mercédès mourns the loss of Dantès, but after eighteen months, she yields to Fernand's persistence and marries him. Fernand participates in multiple military campaigns and is promoted through the officer ranks. During the Greek War of Independence, he is stationed in Yanina as an attaché and defending officer to the local ruler, Ali Pasha. Rather than defending the city of Yanina, Fernand accepts a large bribe from the Ottoman Empire, surrendering the fortress and betraying Ali Pasha, who is subsequently killed. Fernand then sells Ali Pasha's wife, Vasiliki, and his young daughter, Haydée, into slavery. Using the wealth obtained from this betrayal, Fernand moves to Paris, purchases the title Count de Morcerf, and secures a position in the Chamber of Peers. He and Mercédès have a son together, Albert de Morcerf.

=== Public scandal ===
Decades after escaping from the Château d'If, Edmond Dantès, operating under the alias of the Count of Monte Cristo, is introduced into Parisian high society after saving the life of Fernand's son, Albert de Morcerf, after he was kidnapped by bandits in Italy. As part of his revenge plot, the Count encourages Baron Danglars into telling the press that betrayal of Ali Pasha was caused by a French officer named Fernand.

Albert de Morcerf attempts to defend his father's reputation by challenging the editor Beauchamp to a duel, but Fernand is called into a hearing in the Chamber of Peers. During the inquiry, Haydée, the daughter of Ali Pasha enters as a witness. She provides official documentation and personal testimony proving that the Count de Morcerf is the officer who betrayed her father and sold her into slavery. The revelation results in Morcerf being found guilty of treason and dishonorably dismissed from the Chamber of Peers.

=== Confrontation and suicide ===
Following the scandal, Albert finds out about the Count of Monte Cristo's role in it and challenges him to a duel. Mercédès, having recognised the Count as Edmond Dantès, begs him to spare her son. She informs Albert of his father's role in Dantès's imprisonment, leading Albert to apologise to the Count, cancelling the duel. Disgraced by his son's refusal to fight, Fernand confronts the Count. During this encounter, he reveals his identity as Edmond Dantès, and when Fernand flees home, he arrives just in time to witness Mercédès and Albert leaving the estate to abandon his name and start a new life. Left alone and facing total social ruin, Fernand commits suicide by shooting himself in his study.

== Depictions in other media ==
=== Films ===
Year	Actor	Role	Film
1918	Jean Garat	Comte de Morcerf	Le Comte de Monte Cristo
1922	Ralph Cloninger	Fernand, Count de Morcert	Monte Cristo
1929	Gaston Modot	Fernand Mondego / Comte de Morcerf	Monte Cristo
1934	Sidney Blackmer	Mondego	The Count of Monte Cristo
1942	René Cardona	Fernando Mondego / Conde de Morcef	El Conde de Montecristo
1943	Henri Bosc	Fernand, Count de Morcerf	Le comte de Monte Cristo, 2ème époque: Le châtiment
1953	Ernesto Bianco	Fernando Mondego	El Conde de Montecristo
1954	Roger Pigaut	Fernand Mondego, Husband of Mércèdes	Le Comte de Monte-Cristo (1ère époque): La Trahison
1961	Jean-Claude Michel	Fernand de Mortcerf	Le Comte de Monte Cristo
1968	Raymond Pellegrin	Morcerf	Sous le signe de Monte-Cristo
1975	Tony Curtis	Fernand Morcerf Mondego	The Count of Monte Cristo
1988	Mikhail Boyarsky	Fernand Mondego, Count de Morcer	Uznik zamka If
2002	Guy Pearce	Fernand Mondego	The Count of Monte Cristo
2024	Bastien Bouillon	Fernand De Morcef	Le Comte de Monte-Cristo

=== Television ===
Year	Actor	Role	Film
1956	Noel Willman	Count de Morcef	The Count of Monte Cristo
1964	Philip Madoc	Fernand Mondego	The Count of Monte Cristo
1966	Alberto Terrani	Fernando Morcef	Il Conte di Montecristo
1977	Huang Zhisen	Lin Zhinan	Dà Bàofù
1979	Manuel Tejada	Fernand Mondego, Comte de Morcerf	Le Comte de Monte-Cristo
1998	Jean Rochefort	Fernand Mondego	Le Comte de Monte Cristo
2004	Jūrōta Kosugi (Japanese), Paul St. Peter (English)	Fernand Morcerf	Gankutsuou: The Count of Monte Cristo
2024	Harry Taurasi	Fernand	The Count of Monte Cristo

=== Stage ===
Year	Actor	Role	Production
1868	Arthur Stirling	Fernand	Monte Cristo
1891	J. G. Grahame	Fernand	Monte Cristo
2009	Michael Shawn Lewis	Mondego	The Count of Monte Cristo

=== Radio adaptions ===
Year	Actor	Role	Programme
1938	Sidney Smith	Mondego	The Mercury Theatre on the Air
1939	Edgar Barrier	Mondego	The Campbell Playhouse

== Bibliography ==
- Dumas, Alexandre (1896). The Romances of Alexander Dumas: Count of Monte Cristo. United States, University of Illinois at Urbana-Champaign, G.D. Sproul.
- Saddleback Educational Publishing (2010). The Count of Monte Cristo Novel Study Guide. United States.
- Dumas, Alexandre (1888). The Count of Monte Cristo.
