= Pierre Picaud =

Shoemaker

- Born: François Pierre Picaud; 2 May 1780; France
- Died: 1815 (aged 34–35); France
- Occupations: Shoemaker, later aristocrat

François "Pierre" Picaud (French: [piko]) was a 19th-century shoemaker in Nîmes, France who may have been the basis for the character of Edmond Dantès in Alexandre Dumas, père's 1844 novel The Count of Monte Cristo.

== Biography ==
In 1807, Picaud was engaged to marry a rich woman, but three jealous friends — Loupian, Solari, and Chaubart — falsely accused him of being a spy for England (a fourth friend, Allut, knew of their conspiracy, but did not report it). He was imprisoned in the Fenestrelle fortress for seven years, not even learning why until his second year there. During his imprisonment he ground a small passageway into a neighboring cell and befriended a wealthy Italian priest named Father Torri who was also held in the fortress. A year later, a dying Torri bequeathed to Picaud a treasure he had hidden in Milan. When Picaud was released after the fall of the French Imperial government in 1814, he took possession of the treasure, returned under another name to Paris and spent 10 years plotting revenge against his former friends.

Picaud first murdered Chaubart or had him murdered. Picaud's former fiancée had, two years after his disappearance, married his former friend Loupian, who became the subject of his most brutal revenge. Picaud tricked Loupian's daughter into marrying a criminal, whom he then had arrested. Loupian's daughter promptly died of shock. Picaud then burned down Loupian's restaurant, or arranged to have it burned down, leaving Loupian impoverished. Next, he fatally poisoned Solari and either manipulated Loupian's son into stealing some gold jewelry or framed him for committing the crime. The boy was sent to jail, and Picaud stabbed Loupian to death. He was himself then abducted by a vengeful Allut, who seriously injured Picaud while holding him captive. Picaud was eventually found by the French police, and they recorded his confession before he died of his injuries.

Allut's deathbed confession forms the bulk of the French police records of the case. The detailed description of Picaud's experiences in prison, which could not have been known to Allut, were supposedly dictated to him by the ghost of Father Torri.

The character of Pierre Picaud may nevertheless be called into question, as there is no record of his existence in the archives. He was probably invented by Étienne-Léon de Lamothe-Langon in order to fictionalize the police archives written by Jacques Peuchet, but published after his death. Genealogists have conducted research in an attempt to identify the person who inspired Lamothe-Langon's character of Pierre Picaud. Their research led them to Gaspard-Étienne Pastorel, a convict who spent several years in prison. There are numerous similarities between him and the character of Pierre Picaud, and it appears that he may have been the true inspiration for Lamothe-Langon's character, which in turn inspired Alexandre Dumas in creating the Count of Monte Cristo.
