= The Count of Monte Cristo (2024 TV series) =

2024 French-Italian Television series

- Based on: The Count of Monte Cristo by Alexandre Dumas
- Written by: Sandro Petraglia; Greg Latter
- Directed by: Bille August
- Starring: Sam Claflin; Mikkel Boe Følsgaard; Ana Girardot; Blake Ritson; Lino Guanciale; Michele Riondino; Gabriella Pession; Nicolas Maupas; Jeremy Irons
- Countries of origin: France; Italy
- Original language: English
- No. of series: 1
- No. of episodes: 8

Production
- Producer: Carlo Degli Esposti
- Production companies: Mediawan; Palomar; DEMD Productions; Entourage Ventures

Original release
- Network: France Télévisions (France); RAI (Italy)
- Release: 15 December 2024 (Switzerland); 18 December 2024 (Sweden); 13 January 2025 (Italy); 25 August 2025 (UK); 22 March 2026 (USA)

The Count of Monte Cristo is a 2024 English-language miniseries directed by Bille August and starring Sam Claflin, based on Alexandre Dumas's book of the same name.

== Plot ==
Unjustly accused of treason, young French sailor Edmond Dantès is imprisoned without trial in the Château d'If, a forbidding island fortress off the coast of Marseille. During years of imprisonment, a fellow prisoner, a scholarly abbot, educates Edmond in multiple subjects. Before dying, the abbot reveals where a vast treasure is hidden on a deserted island. Edmond escapes and, finding the treasure, assumes the identity of the Count of Monte Cristo. He uses his wealth to exact revenge against his betrayers.

== Cast ==
- Sam Claflin as Edmond Dantès
- Mikkel Boe Følsgaard as Gérard de Villefort
- Ana Girardot as Mercédès Herrera
- Blake Ritson as Baron Danglars
- Karla-Simone Spence as Haydée
- Lino Guanciale as Luigi Vampa
- Michele Riondino as Jacopo
- Gabriella Pession as Madame Hermine Danglars
- Harry Taurasi as Fernand Mondego, Count de Morcerf
- Poppy Corby-Tuech as Héloïse de Villefort
- Nicolas Maupas as Albert de Morcerf
- Amaryllis August as Valentine de Villefort
- Jason Barnett as Gaspard Caderousse
- Nicholas Farrell as Pierre Morrel
- John Ioannou as Noirtier de Villefort
- Martina Laird as Sabrine
- Matthew Wilson as Lucien Debray
- Simone Zambelli as Ettore
- Ben Moor as Beauchamp
- Jeremy Irons as Abbé Faria
- Greg Hughes as Boville
- Robin Greer as Maximilien Morrel
- Bastien Fontaine-Oberto as Franz d'Épinay

== Production ==
It was produced by Mediawan with Palomar in Italy and DEMD Productions in France, and in association with Entourage Ventures. Producer Carlo Degli Esposti, co-founder of Italian production company Palomar, said that their goal was to create a series with a modern twist while remaining faithful to the legacy of Alexandre Dumas' work. DEMD's Sébastien Pavard explained that producing the series in English allowed the collaborators to bring together key personnel from Italy, France, Denmark and England.

According to Élisabeth d'Arvieu, head of Mediawan Pictures, the project was initiated by Palomar, the Italian production company of the Mediawan group, and then turned to its French subsidiary DEMD Productions to make a French-Italian co-production. Speaking of Bille August's involvement, she said that they had striven to give the series a cinematic appeal, as reflected both in the budget and by the recruitment of such a director with both the Palme d'Or and the Oscar victories to his name.

Manuel Alduy, director of cinema and young adult and international drama at France Télévisions, explained that the collaboration with RAI marked the twelfth international series co-produced by the European Alliance.

== Filming ==
Filming began between August and December 2023 and took place in several locations in Paris. Other filming locations include Turin, Milan and Malta. Jeremy Irons told Variety that the castle used in the production in Malta is the same age as the one mentioned in Dumas' original text.

== Casting ==
In early August 2023, Digital Spy and Movieplayer.it sites revealed that Sam Claflin would play the role of Edmond Dantès, joined by Ana Girardot and Nicolas Maupas.

On 11 October 2023, Variety, picked up by the website Collider, revealed that the cast also included Mikkel Boe Følsgaard, Blake Ritson, Karla-Simone Spence, Michele Riondino, Lino Guanciale and Gabriella Pession.

== Episodes ==
=== Episode 1 : The Letter ===
On the death of its captain, First Mate Edmond Dantès assumes command of a merchant ship and battles through a storm to guide it home to Marseilles. The owner, Morrel, rewards him by promotion to the captaincy provoking the fury of the ship’s agent, Danglars. Dantès prepares for his wedding to Mercédès, a Catalan woman, who is told by her passionate cousin Fernand that by tradition he should marry her instead. The jealous pair, Danglars and Fernand, denounce Dantès as a Bonapartist traitor in a letter to the police. Although innocent, Dantès is arrested on the day prior to his wedding. The prosecutor Villefort, to avoid risk of disgrace to his family, ignores the evidence and incarcerates Dantès in the Château d'If, a prison reputed to be inescapable.

=== Episode 2 : The Castle ===
Dantès cannot fathom the reasons for his arrest: there was no trial, no conviction, only silence. While he proclaims his innocence, Morrel and Mercédès still hope to see him again one day. They are deceived by Villefort, however, who leads them to believe that Dantès has taken his own life. Ten years pass. Broken by imprisonment, Dantès hears a noise behind his cell wall one evening and meets Abbé Faria, a learned political prisoner who has been patiently digging an escape route for a long time. Through him, Dantès' hope is rekindled. The Abbé educates him, shares his knowledge, and reveals the existence of the Spada treasure, hidden on the island of Monte Cristo. Upon the death of the Abbé, Dantès takes his place in the burial sack and allows himself to be cast into the sea. He manages to escape by swimming to the mainland.

=== Episode 3 : The Treasure ===
Upon returning to Marseille disguised as a peasant, Dantès learns that his fiancée, Mercédès, has married Fernand and that his own father has died. On visiting the cemetery he is shocked to see his own grave beside that of his father. After saving a Tuscan smuggler, Jacopo, from arrest, he commandeers the latter's boat to reach the island of Monte Cristo. Using a map which had been in the possession of the Abbé Faria, he discovers the hidden treasure and so becomes immensely wealthy. Now transformed into the Count of Monte Cristo, Dantès takes Jacopo into his service and together they discover the reason for his incarceration: the initial betrayal by Danglars and Fernand and the subsequent selfish machinations of Villefort.

=== Episode 4 : The Red Room ===
Five years later, Dantès and his assistants have been investigating those against whom he seeks vengeance. Danglars is a wealthy banker, dishonestly profiting from inside information provided by his wife who is having an affair with a government official. Fernand has become the Count de Morcerf, following a supposedly illustrious military career, which Dantès discovers to be actually concealing terrible treachery. Villefort has risen to the very top of the legal system but is also guilty of a heinous crime: he buried alive the newly born son that he fathered with the wife of Danglars.

Dantès seeks to inveigle himself into the lives of his enemies and their families. In Rome, he befriends Albert, the son of Fernand and Mercédès, and wins his trust by staging a fake rescue from the bandit, Luigi Vampa. He then presents himself in Paris as a wealthy and influential count to Mercédès, Danglars, and Villefort.

=== Episode 5 : The Ball ===
Dantès has purchased the freedom of the girl Haydée and brought her from Constantinople to Paris. She had been sold into slavery by Fernand after he had betrayed and caused the death of her father. Dantès hosts a dinner party for his three enemies and their wives. Haydée witnesses the wife of Villefort stealing poison from Dantès' laboratory.

Dantès takes the first steps in the financial ruin of Danglars by personally transmitting bogus market-sensitive information which leads the latter to make catastrophic investment decisions.

At a ball hosted by Fernand's family, Dantès hints at his true identity to Mercédès. Haydée confirms that Fernand is the man who betrayed her father in the Near East.

=== Episode 6 : Providence ===
Dantès methodically pursues his revenge by undermining the alliances of his adversaries and their families. He instructs Luigi Vampa, disguised as the enormously wealthy Count Spada, to induce Danglars to break off the planned engagement between his daughter Eugénie and Albert de Morcerf. Meanwhile, in Villefort's household, the mother of his first wife dies after being poisoned. Her granddaughter Valentine is subsequently arrested as she had brewed the implicated contaminated tea. In reality Villefort's second wife had administered the poison, which she had earlier stolen from Dantès' house. For his part, Dantès tracks down and takes in Gaston, the child Villefort had tried to dispose of at birth, but who the midwife had secretly saved from burial. However the young man flees after committing theft and murder, jeopardizing part of Dantès' plan.

=== Episode 7 : The Duel ===
Danglars, guided by Dantès, publicly exposes Fernand's past misdeeds, sparking a massive scandal. Haydée is called to testify to confirm Fernand's treachery. Prior to her return to the Near East, she warns Dantès of the human cost of his vengeance. To defend his father's honor, Albert challenges Dantès to a duel but at the last moment changes his mind and apologises after learning the truth from Mercédès. Cornered by these revelations and confronted by Dantès, who reveals his true identity, Fernand takes his own life.

=== Episode 8 : The Last Two ===
Dantès' vengeance draws to a close. He reveals to Villefort that his second wife had been witnessed stealing the poison which was used in the crime for which Valentine stands accused. During the trial of Gaston for murder, his true identity is revealed and Villefort's despicable actions in this regard are exposed.

Dantès has supplied details of Danglars' unlawful financial transactions to the press. At the supposed engagement ceremony between Eugénie and Count Spada, Danglars and his associates are arrested. In prison, Danglars receives a letter from Dantès which confirms his true identity.

With a similar purpose in mind, Dantès visits Villefort but is shaken to find the latter's wife has killed both herself and her son, using the poison she had stolen. Faced with this death of an innocent young boy, Dantès comes to appreciate the real magnitude of his actions. Intent on leaving France, he confides to Mercédès how Abbé Faria had foreseen such a ruinous outcome from the pursuit of revenge. She tries to comfort him, saying "Love can heal".

== Broadcast ==
The series premiered at the 19th Rome Film Festival on 19 October 2024. The show premiered in Switzerland on 15 December 2024 on RTS 1, airing its first two episodes consecutively. In Sweden, the series was released online on SVT Play on 18 December 2024. The series was broadcast by Rai 1 in Italy on 13 January 2025, and will be broadcast on France Televisions in France in 2025. The series was broadcast in La 2 in Spain from 5 to 19 August 2025. In the UK, the series was broadcast on the streaming service U, beginning from 2 August 2025. PBS Masterpiece will screen the series in the US from 22 March 2026.

== Reception ==
=== Critical response ===
Critical reception of the series has been mixed, though appears at least in part to reflect the individual reviewer's opinion of the original Dumas source material. Lucy Mangan writing in The Guardian is particularly scathing, writing: "Jeremy Irons and Sam Claflin star in this extraordinary adaptation of Alexandre Dumas' ludicrous 1844 novel. It's full of howlers, wooden acting and terrible dialogue, but at points it's so bad it's fun". John Anderson in The Wall Street Journal is more restrained: "Containing one of the more convoluted Dumas plots—which is saying something—'The Count of Monte Cristo' is tailored by director Bille August into a relatively tidy eight episodes … once Mr August gets us past his very soft and charmless introduction, his version gains momentum". In contrast, the online entertainment publication Collider highly recommends the series. Its review states: "The Count of Monte Cristo sets a near-perfect new standard both for luxurious period dramas and for modern re-imaginsations that preserve the text's essence".

It is also instructive to consider the critical reception for the TV series in France, birthplace of the novel's author. An important factor potentially influencing local opinion there is that in the same year a successful and highly regarded French-language film adaptation had been released into cinemas. According to Première magazine the series is arguably the most faithful adaptation of the work ever produced, having seven hours to bring the lengthy novel to the screen. Furthermore AlloCiné considers that Bille August delivers a genuine period drama, epic when it needs to be, and moving during its quieter moments. Télé-Loisirs is also enthusiastic, stating that this adaptation surpasses the film version, exploring the shadowy side of a tragic hero who risks losing his humanity in his quest to play the avenging god.
