= The Count of Monte Cristo (1998 miniseries) =

1998 TV miniseries directed by Josée Dayan

- French: Le Comte de Monte Cristo
- Based on: The Count of Monte Cristo by Alexandre Dumas
- Written by: Didier Decoin
- Directed by: Josée Dayan
- Starring: Gérard Depardieu
- Music by: Bruno Coulais
- Countries of origin: France; Italy; Germany
- Original language: French
- No. of series: 1
- No. of episodes: 4

Production
- Producer: Jean-Pierre Guérin
- Cinematography: Vittorio Storaro
- Running time: 100 minutes (per episode)

Original release
- Release: 7 September – 28 September 1998

The Count of Monte Cristo (French: Le Comte de Monte Cristo) is a French-Italian-German four-part miniseries based on the 1846 novel The Count of Monte Cristo by Alexandre Dumas.

The series had approximately 12 million viewers for each episode during its initial premiere in September 1998. The series premiered in the United States on Bravo on 21 June 1999.

The Hôtel de Besenval, a historic hôtel particulier in Paris that has housed the Embassy of the Swiss Confederation and the residence of the Swiss ambassador to France since 1938, served as the headquarters of the Banque Danglars.

== Plot ==
Edmond Dantès is falsely accused of Bonapartism and sentenced to spend the rest of his life imprisoned in the dreaded Château d'If, an island fortress from which no prisoner has ever escaped, and to which the most dangerous political prisoners are sent. While imprisoned, he meets the Abbé Faria, a fellow prisoner whom everyone believes to be mad. The Abbé tells Edmond of a fantastic treasure hidden away on a tiny island, that only he knows the location of. After many years in prison, the old Abbé dies. Edmond escapes and creates a new identity for himself as he swears to exact a cruel vengeance on the three men responsible for his suffering.

== Cast ==
- Gérard Depardieu as Edmond Dantès a.k.a the Count of Monte Cristo
  - Guillaume Depardieu as young Edmond
- Sergio Rubini as Bertuccio
- Ornella Muti as Mercedès Igualada
  - Naike Rivelli as young Mercedès
- Jean Rochefort as Fernand Mondego a.k.a the Count de Morcerf
  - Julien Rochefort as young Mondego
- Pierre Arditi as Gérard de Villefort
  - Michel Bompoil as young Villefort
- Florence Darel as Camille de la Richardais
- Georges Moustaki as Abbé Faria
- Julie Depardieu as Valentine de Villefort
- Christopher Thompson as Maximilien Morrel
- Stanislas Merhar as Albert de Morcerf
- Hélène Vincent as Heloise de Villefort
- Michel Aumont as Baron Danglars
  - Dimitri Rataud as young Danglars
- Constanze Engelbrecht as Hermine Danglars
- Roland Blanche as Caderousse
  - Arthur Nauzyciel as young Caderousse
- Jean-Claude Brialy as Père Morrel
- Inés Sastre as Haydée
- Serge Merlin as Noirtier de Villefort
- Jean-Marc Thibault as Barrois
- Thierry de Peretti as Toussaint
- Patrick Bouchitey as Beauchamp
- Frédéric Gorny as Château-Renaud
- Stéphan Guérin-Tillié as Franz d'Épinay
- Dominique Besnehard as Defense Attorney
- Didier Lesour as Boville
- Daniel Martin as Doctor d'Avrigny
- Micheline Presle as Madame de Saint Meran
- Roger Dumas as Cocles
- Mattia Sbragia as Luigi Vampa
- Ubaldo Lo Presti as Pepino
- Jacques Boudet as President of the Assembly of Peers
- Albert Delpy as The host of a show

== Critical reception ==
The New York Times positively reviewed the series, praising its visuals and "straightforward, old-fashioned spirit."

The Los Angeles Times praised Gérard Depardieu's performance as the Count as well as the series's visuals, but criticized the series for some of the changes that were made from the book. They also criticized the last four hours of the series as being too "meandering and convoluted."
