= The Count of Monte Cristo (1975 film) =

1975 British TV film by David Greene

- Genre: Adventure; Drama; History
- Based on: The Count of Monte Cristo by Alexandre Dumas
- Written by: Sidney Carroll
- Directed by: David Greene
- Starring: Richard Chamberlain; Kate Nelligan; Tony Curtis; Louis Jourdan; Donald Pleasence; Trevor Howard; Isabelle de Valvert
- Theme music composer: Allyn Ferguson
- Country of origin: United Kingdom
- Original language: English

Production
- Producer: Norman Rosemont
- Production locations: Cinecittà Studios, Cinecittà, Rome, Lazio, Italy; Portovenere, La Spezia, Liguria, Italy; Rome, Lazio, Italy
- Cinematography: Aldo Tonti
- Editor: Gene Milford
- Running time: 119 minutes (European version); 103 minutes (American version)
- Production companies: Incorporated Television Company; Norman Rosemont Productions

Original release
- Network: NBC
- Release: January 10, 1975

The Count of Monte Cristo is a 1975 television film produced by ITC Entertainment and based upon the 1844 novel The Count of Monte Cristo by Alexandre Dumas. Like the novel, the film emphasizes the theme of revenge and manipulation of characters by the main character, Edmond Dantès. The film was directed by David Greene and stars Richard Chamberlain as Edmond Dantès, Kate Nelligan as Mercedes, Tony Curtis as Fernand Mondego, Louis Jourdan (who played Dantès in the 1961 film adaptation of the novel) as De Villefort, Donald Pleasence as Danglars, Trevor Howard as Abbé Faria, and Isabelle de Valvert as Haydee. ITC had previously produced a 39-part TV series based on the same source material and broadcast in 1956.

This film had a theatrical release across some European countries.

The film was remade in 1986 in Telugu as Veta.

== Plot ==
Edmond Dantès is wrongfully sent to prison by a trio of scheming men, one of whom is motivated to have his fiancée, Mercedes. Mentored in prison from which there is never an escape, he manages to flee the island fortress. He locates a vast treasure on another island and reinvents himself as the Count of Monte Cristo. He seeks revenge on the men who ruined him and some of the people close to them. As in the novel, Dantès loses Mercedes because of his vengeful bitterness.

Highlights of the film include: the courtroom scene in which Dantès brings down crown prosecutor De Villefort; the scene between Dantès and Mercedes when he reveals Mondego's treachery to her; and the final swordfight with Mondego.

== Cast ==
- Richard Chamberlain as Edmond Dantès/The Count of Monte Cristo
- Donald Pleasence as Danglars
- Louis Jourdan as Gérard de Villefort
- Tony Curtis as General Fernand Mondego
- Kate Nelligan as Mercédès
- Trevor Howard as Abbé Faria
- Dominic Guard as Albert Mondego
- Taryn Power as Valentine De Villefort
- Dominic Barto as Bertuccio
- Alessio Orano as Caderousse
- Angelo Infanti as Jacopo
- Isabelle De Valvert as Haydee
- Anthony Dawson as Noirtier De Villefort
- Harold Bromley as M. Morrell
- George Willing as Andre Morrell
- Carlo Puri as Andrea Benedetto
- Ralph Michael as M. Dantès
- Harry Baird as Ali

== Differences between the film and novel ==
Several significant supporting characters are omitted, and several scenes differ from the novel. Villefort's wife is not shown, and there is no mention of her poisoning anyone. In the novel, Mondego commits suicide, whereas in the film it is Danglars who does that. In the novel, Dantès and Mondego do not engage in a swordfight. Haydee has only a minor role in the film, and there is no confirmation that she and Monte Cristo become lovers as in the book.

=== Characters omitted ===
The following participants in major sub-plots of the Dumas novel are not portrayed in the film:

- Luigi Vampa
- Maximilian Morrel
- Hermine Danglars
- Eugenie Danglars
- Lucien Debray
- Beauchamp
- Heloise Villefort
- Edouard Villefort
- Marquis Saint-Méran
- Marquise of Saint-Méran

== Production ==
The film was produced by Norman Rosemont, who originally tried to do it as a mini series but could not sell it. Instead he signed a deal with NBC to make it as a TV movie, although the film would be released theatrically in Europe. The budget was one and a half million dollars.

Bell Telephone Company sponsored, and the film was shown as part of the Bell System Family Theatre. Richard Chamberlain explained why he agreed to star, calling it "a great story" and said he chose not to see the previous movie versions because he "didn't want to copy even unconsciously". Norman Rosemont explained, "We tried to stick as closely as possible to the novel. And with Chamberlain in the lead I've got to say the show worked out better than anyone could want".

Rosemont remembered "grave doubts were expressed by the networks about whether there was a mass audience for period pieces. They were in costume, there was the worry about accents and inevitably they would cost more than a period drama".

In August 1974, filming began in Rome. Some scenes were shot outside Marseille.

The cast included Taryn Power, the daughter of Tyrone Power and Linda Christian.

== Reception ==
The show received good ratings. Market research showed the program had good "commercial recall" and reflected well on sponsor Bell, so they wanted more. Norman Rosemont subsequently produced other film adaptations of novels: The Man in the Iron Mask (1977), Captains Courageous (1977) and The Four Feathers (1978).

=== Awards and nominations ===
Year	Award	Category	Nominee(s)	Result	Ref.
1975	Primetime Emmy Awards	Outstanding Lead Actor in a Special Program – Drama or Comedy	Richard Chamberlain	Nominated	
1975	Primetime Emmy Awards	Outstanding Single Performance by a Supporting Actor in a Comedy or Drama Special	Trevor Howard	Nominated	
