= The Count of Monte Cristo (1956 TV series) =

1956 British TV drama series

- Created by: Sidney Marshall
- Starring: George Dolenz
- Country of origin: United Kingdom
- No. of episodes: 39

Production
- Cinematography: Lionel Banes
- Running time: 25 minutes
- Production companies: ITC Entertainment; TPA

Original release
- Network: ATV for ITV
- Release: 20 February – 7 December 1956

The Count of Monte Cristo is a 1956 British cult swashbuckler adventure television series produced by ITC Entertainment/TPA and adapted very loosely from the 1844 novel by Alexandre Dumas by Sidney Marshall. It premiered in the UK in early 1956 and ran for 39 thirty-minute episodes dramatizing the continuing adventures of Edmond Dantès, the self-styled Count of Monte Cristo, during the reign of Louis Philippe I d'Orléans, King of the French from 1830 to 1848. The first twelve episodes were filmed in the United States, at the Hal Roach studios, with the rest being filmed at ITC's traditional home of Elstree.

ITC produced a film based on the same source-material, The Count of Monte-Cristo, in 1975.

== Cast ==
- George Dolenz
- Fortunio Bonanova
- Robert Cawdron
- Nick Cravat

=== Guest cast ===
- Patrick Troughton
- Stratford Johns
- Cyril Shaps
- Anthony Newlands
- John Barrard
- Raf De La Torre
- Nigel Davenport

== Episodes ==
1. "A Toy for the Infanta"
2. "Marseilles"
3. "The Luxembourg Affair"
4. "The Texas Affair"
5. "The Mazzini Affair"
6. "The Carbonari"
7. "The Devil's Emissary"
8. "Bordeaux"
9. "Flight to Calais"
10. "Albania"
11. "Naples"
12. "The Art of Terror"
13. "The Experiment"
14. "Mecklenburg"
15. "The Portuguese Affair"
16. "Lichtenburg"
17. "Burgundy"
18. "Majorca"
19. "Sicily"
20. "A Matter of Justice"
21. "Athens"
22. "The Talleyrand Affair"
23. "The Island"
24. "The Barefoot Empress"
25. "The Brothers"
26. "Monaco"
27. "Point, Counter Point"
28. "The Black Death"
29. "Victor Hugo"
30. "Return to the Chateau D'if"
31. "The Pen and the Sword"
32. "The Sardinian Affair"
33. "The Affair of the Three Napoleons"
34. "The Deberry Affair"
35. "The First Train to Paris"
36. "The Golden Blade"
37. "The Duel"
38. "Andorra"
39. "An Affair of Honour"

== Home media ==
A 5-disc DVD set containing all thirty-nine re-mastered and uncut, original episodes was released by Network Distributing Ltd Home Entertainment/Granada Ventures Ltd on 12 April 2010 (currently only in Region 2 PAL format; not yet available in the United States).
