= The Count of Monte Cristo (1934 film) =

1934 film by Rowland V. Lee

- Theatrical release poster
- Directed by: Rowland V. Lee
- Screenplay by: Philip Dunne; Rowland V. Lee; Dan Totheroh
- Based on: The Count of Monte Cristo; 1844-45 novel by Alexandre Dumas
- Produced by: Edward Small
- Starring: Robert Donat; Elissa Landi
- Cinematography: J. Peverell Marley
- Edited by: Grant Whytock
- Music by: Score: Alfred Newman; Songs: Johnny Green (music); Yip Harburg (lyrics)
- Production company: Reliance Pictures
- Distributed by: United Artists
- Release date: September 7, 1934 (USA)
- Running time: 113 minutes
- Country: United States
- Language: English
- Box office: $1.5 million

The Count of Monte Cristo is a 1934 American adventure film directed by Rowland V. Lee and starring Robert Donat and Elissa Landi. Based on the 1844 novel The Count of Monte Cristo by Alexandre Dumas, the story concerns a man who is unjustly imprisoned for 20 years for innocently delivering a letter entrusted to him. When he finally escapes, he seeks revenge against the greedy men who conspired to put him in prison.

This is the first sound film adaptation of Dumas' novel; five silent films preceded it.

== Plot ==
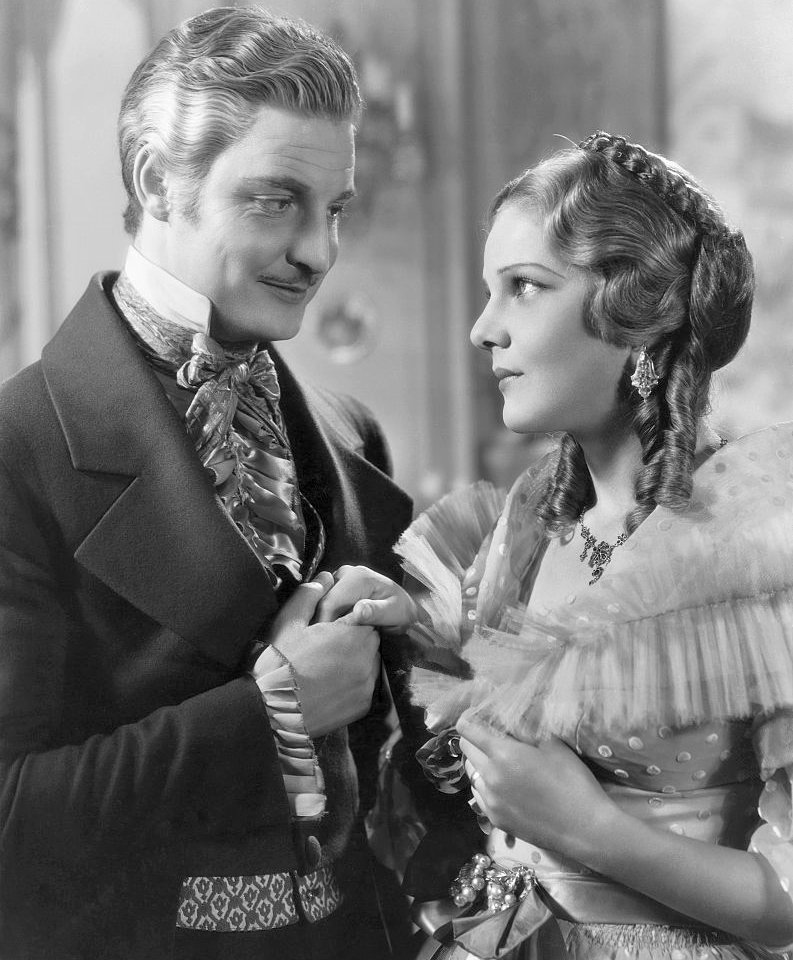
Robert Donat and Elissa Landi in The Count of Monte Cristo

In 1815, a French merchant ship stops at the island of Elba. A letter from the exiled Napoleon is given to the ship's captain to deliver to a man in Marseille. Before dying of a sickness, the captain entrusts the task to his first officer, Edmond Dantès. However, the city magistrate, Raymond de Villefort, Jr., is tipped off by an informer, the second officer, Danglars, and has Dantès arrested after the exchange.

Dantès' friend Fernand Mondego accompanies him to the jail, but he, Danglars, and de Villefort all stand to gain from keeping Dantès imprisoned: Mondego is in love with Dantès' fiancée, Mercedes; Danglars wants to be promoted captain in Dantès' place; and the man who accepted the letter turns out to be de Villefort's father. De Villefort consigns Dantès without trial to a prison, the Château d'If, on the false testimony of Danglars.

When Napoleon returns to France, giving Dantès' friends hope for his release, de Villefort signs a false statement that he was killed trying to escape, which Mondego shows to Mercedes. Deceived, she gives in to her mother's deathbed wish and marries Mondego.

Eight years of solitary confinement follow for Dantès. Then one day, the aged Abbé Faria, a fellow prisoner, breaks into his cell through a tunnel he has been digging. The two join forces; Faria calculates it will take five more years to finish. In the meantime, he starts educating Dantès.

As they near their goal, a cave-in fatally injures the old man. Before dying, he bequeaths a hidden treasure to his protégé (Faria's enemies had tortured and imprisoned him in an unsuccessful attempt to extract its location). The body is sewn into a shroud, but while the undertaker is away, Dantès substitutes himself for the corpse undetected. He is cast into the sea. He frees himself and is picked up by a smuggling ship.

Dantès later follows Faria's directions and finds the treasure on the uninhabited island of Monte Cristo. With a fortune at his command, he sets in motion his plans for revenge. To begin, he arranges to have Albert (Mercedes and Mondego's son) kidnapped and held for ransom. Dantès "rescues" the younger man in order to gain entry into Paris society, using his purchased title of Count of Monte Cristo.

First to be brought to justice is Mondego. While being the French ambassador to Albania, Mondego gained renown for his bravery in an unsuccessful defense of Ali Pasha. Dantès arranges a ball to "honour" his enemy, then arranges to have him exposed publicly as the one who betrayed Ali Pasha to his death at the hands of the Turks. Unaware of the count's role in his disgrace, Mondego goes to him for advice. Dantès reveals his identity and they engage in a duel; Dantès wins, but spares Mondego, who returns home and commits suicide.

Next is Danglars, now the most influential banker in Paris. Dantès uses his services to buy and sell shares, sharing tips he receives from his informants. When these turn out to be infallibly profitable, Danglars bribes a man to send him copies of messages to Dantès. Greed leads him to invest all of his money on the next report, just as Dantès had planned. When the tip proves to be false, Danglars is bankrupted. Dantès reveals his true identity to Danglars, who is left penniless and insane.

However, there are unexpected complications that threaten Dantès' plans. Albert Mondego learns of his involvement in his father's downfall and challenges him to a duel. Mercedes, who had recognized Dantès upon their first meeting, begs him not to kill Albert. He agrees. Albert deliberately changes his aim because Mercedes has told him who Monte Cristo really is, and the duel ends without injury.

De Villefort has risen to the high office of State Attorney. Dantès sends him information about his true identity and activities, which leads to his arrest and trial. At first, Dantès refuses to testify, to shield de Villefort's daughter Valentine, who is in love with Albert. When she learns of it, she urges him to defend himself. Dantès does so, providing evidence of de Villefort's longstanding corruption.

With all of his enemies destroyed, Dantès is reunited with Mercedes.

== Cast ==
- Robert Donat as Edmond Dantes / The Count of Monte Cristo
- Elissa Landi as Mercedes de Rosas
- Louis Calhern as Raymond de Villefort Jr.
- Sidney Blackmer as Fernand Mondego, Count de Mondego
- Raymond Walburn as Baron Danglars
- O. P. Heggie as the Abbé Faria
- Irene Hervey as Valentine de Villefort
- Georgia Caine as Madame de Rosas, Mercedes' mother
- Lawrence Grant as de Villefort Sr.
- Luis Alberni as Jacopo, Dantes' assistant
- Douglas Walton as Albert Mondego
- Paul Irving as Napoleon
- Juliette Compton as Clothilde
- Holmes Herbert as Judge
- Clarence Muse as Ali
- Lionel Belmore as Prison Governor
- William Farnum as Captain Leclere
- Paul Fix as Angry Citizen
- Ferdinand Munier as Louis XVIII
- Eric Wilton as Dantes Servant (uncredited)

== Production ==
This was the third film producer Edward Small made for United Artists. Fredric March was the original choice for the title role. Eventually Robert Donat was cast under an international star loan agreement negotiated by Joseph Schenck of United Artists.

Director Rowland V. Lee and playwright Dan Totheroh had written a treatment based on the novel. Totheroh had to go to New York so Edward Small hired Philip Dunne, then an emerging screenwriter, to compose the dialogue. According to Dunne there were only seven words of Dumas in the final dialogue: "the world is mine!" spoken by Edmund Dantes when he gets his treasure, and "one, two, three" when he disposes of his enemies.

Dunne added: "I told the director, Rowland Lee, I'd never read the novel. He said he'd act it out for me and he did such a good job I've never read it. In fact, I used all his dialogue, I just wrote it down.... But I got my first credit".

Filming started in May 1934.

== Differences from the novel ==
The film changes some major details of the story. Prominent characters from the novel such as Bertuccio, Caderousse, Franz D'Épinay, Andrea Cavalcanti, Louise d'Armilly, Eugénie Danglars, Maximilian Morrel, Edouard de Villefort and Heloise de Villefort are all omitted. Haydee's role is reduced to two brief appearances, and her romantic involvement with Monte Cristo is not referred to.

In the novel, Dantes and Mercedes did not rekindle their relationship. Danglars and Fernand betrayed Dantes anonymously via a letter rather than in person, and Dantes only discovered their betrayal once in prison. Mercedes was the daughter of a fisherman, not from a wealthy family as suggested in the film, and there was no indication that her mother was opposed to the Dantes marriage. Monte Cristo and Fernand did not engage in a sword fight. Monte Cristo was not put on trial, as he is in the movie's finale. It was Villefort rather than Danglars who went insane - Danglars, although he loses almost all of his ill-gotten gains, since Monte Cristo by the time he has set upon him is beginning to wonder whether excessive revenge (which is destroying much more than he meant) is quite the expedient, is the only person left with his life and sanity, although he was the worst of Dantes' betrayers originally.

== Reception, sequels and remakes ==
The film was very popular — Philip Dunne said it "provided Eddie Small with a fortune almost as great as the Treasure of Spada".

Voted one of the ten best pictures of 1934 by the National Board of Review of Motion Pictures and Film Daily's poll of critics, it was nominated on two of the American Film Institute's annual lists: AFI's 100 Years...100 Thrills in 2001, and AFI's 100 Years...100 Heroes & Villains in 2003.

Small produced two sequels, the first one announced almost immediately. They both took several years to be made: The Son of Monte Cristo (1940), The Return of Monte Cristo (1946).

Subsequent adaptations of the novel were made in 1943, 1954, 1961, 1975, 2002 and 2024.

In the 2005 dystopian political thriller V for Vendetta, the titular anarchist refers to The Count of Monte Cristo as his favorite film. Snippets of the first duel scene, as well as the final scene, appear in the movie.
