= Crown prosecutor =

State prosecutor in many jurisdictions

Crown prosecutor is the title given in a number of jurisdictions to the state prosecutor, the legal party responsible for presenting the case against an individual in a criminal trial. The title is commonly used in Commonwealth realms.

== Examples ==
- Crown Prosecution Service (England and Wales)
- Crown prosecutor (Australia)
- Crown prosecutor (New Zealand)
- Crown attorney (Canada)
  - "Crown prosecutor" in New Brunswick, Alberta and Quebec
  - "Crown counsel" in British Columbia

== See also ==
- Attorney general
- District attorney (United States)
