= The Count of Monte Cristo (1964 TV series) =

1964 British TV drama series

- Directed by: Peter Hammond
- Starring: Alan Badel
- Country of origin: United Kingdom
- No. of episodes: 12

Production
- Producer: Campbell Logan
- Running time: 25 minutes

Original release
- Network: BBC One
- Release: 4 October – 20 December 1964

The Count of Monte Cristo is a British twelve-part miniseries dramatisation of Alexandre Dumas' 1844 novel of the same name. Produced by the BBC and starring Alan Badel in the title role, it was transmissioned from 4 October to 20 December 1964 on BBC One.

As well as being the only BBC version, the serial survived the corporation's junking policy intact and is available on DVD.

== Premise ==
Edmond Dantes, a sailor, is falsely accused and imprisoned by three men who have various reasons to be jealous of him. After 14 years imprisoned in the Chateau d'If he escapes, and, after recovering a treasure hidden on the island of Monte Cristo revealed to him by the Abbe Faria, a fellow prisoner, he embarks on a campaign of revenge against those who have wronged him.

== Cast ==
- Alan Badel as Edmond Dantes
- Natasha Parry as Mercédès
- Philip Madoc as Fernand Mondego
- Morris Perry as Danglars
- Michael Gough as Villefort
- Michael Robbins as Caderousse
- Anthony Newlands as M. Morel
- John Wentworth as Abbe Faria
- David Calderisi as Jacopo
- Cyril Shaps as Bertuccio
- Rosalie Crutchley as Mme. Danglars
- Patricia English as Mme. Villefort
- Sandor Eles as Albert Morcerf
- Isobel Black as Eugenie Danglars
- Anna Palk as Valentine Villefort
- Edward de Souza as Maximilian Morel
- Austin Trevor as Cavalcanti
- Richard Kay as Benedetto
- Valerie Sarruf as Haydee

== Production ==
The series was made in 12 episodes of 25 minutes each, with a total run time of 300 minutes. It was filmed in black and white and had an intense, theatrical style. The script remained largely faithful to the original plot, and is regarded as the best screen version of the story, with Badel as the definitive Count. The series was produced by Campbell Logan, and directed by Peter Hammond. The screenplay was by Anthony Steven.

It is unknown if the production was broadcast live with pre-film inserts or if it was broadcast from 405-line videotapes which were wiped at a later date, although all episodes survive as 35mm telerecordings.

== Episodes ==
| No. | Episode | Air date |
|---|---|---|
| 1 | "The Plotters" | 4 October 1964 |
| 2 | "The Chateau D'If" | 11 October 1964 |
| 3 | "The Abbe Faria" | 18 October 1964 |
| 4 | "A Perilous Journey" | 25 October 1964 |
| 5 | "The Isle of Monte Cristo" | 1 November 1964 |
| 6 | "A Garden in Auteuil" | 8 November 1964 |
| 7 | "Unlimited Credit" | 15 November 1964 |
| 8 | "Evidence of a Crime" | 22 November 1964 |
| 9 | "News from Janina" | 29 November 1964 |
| 10 | "A Challenge" | 6 December 1964 |
| 11 | "Dishonour" | 13 December 1964 |
| 12 | "An End to Revenge" | 20 December 1964 |
