= Edmond Dantès =

Protagonist of Alexandre Dumas's 1844 novel The Count of Monte Cristo

- The Count of Monte Cristo character
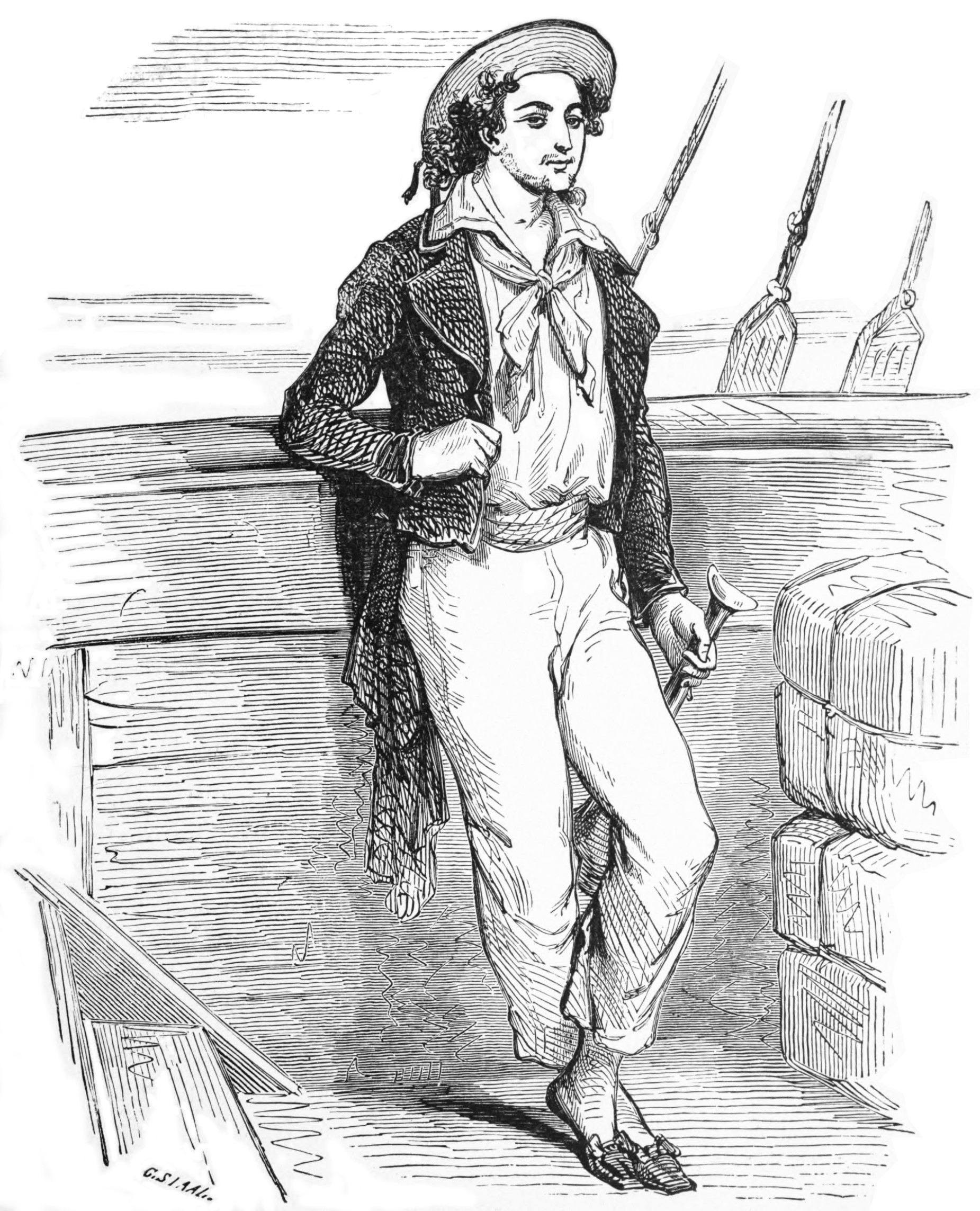
- Illustration of Edmond Dantès by Pierre-Gustave Staal (1888)
- Created by: Alexandre Dumas
- Based on: Pierre Picaud
- Portrayed by: John Gilbert; Robert Donat; Martin Kosleck; Jean Marais; George Dolenz; Richard Chamberlain; Gérard Depardieu; Jim Caviezel; Craig Horner; Matthew Holloway; Emily VanCamp (as Emily Thorne); Pierre Niney; Sam Claflin

In-universe information
- Aliases: The Count of Monte Cristo; Sinbad the Sailor; Abbé Busoni; Lord Wilmore; Dantes
- Gender: Male
- Occupation: Merchant sailor (initially); Aristocrat
- Significant others: Mercédès Mondego (ex-fiancée); Haydée Tebelin
- Relatives: Louis Dantès (father)
- Origin: Marseille, France
- Nationality: French

Edmond Dantès (pronounced [ɛdmɔ̃ dɑ̃tɛs]) is a title character, Byronic hero and the protagonist of Alexandre Dumas's 1844 adventure novel The Count of Monte Cristo. Within the story's narrative, Dantès is an intelligent, honest and loving man who turns bitter and vengeful after he is framed for a crime he did not commit. When Dantès finds himself free and enormously wealthy, he takes it upon himself to reward those who have helped him in his plight and punish those responsible for his years of suffering. He is known by the aliases The Count of Monte Cristo (French: le Comte de Monte-Cristo), Abbé Busoni, Lord Wilmore, and Sinbad the Sailor.

== History ==
=== Dantès, first mate ===
The action of the story begins in 1814, soon after the abdication of Napoleon and the first Bourbon Restoration in France. When the reader is first introduced to Edmond Dantès, he has arrived in Marseille as first mate aboard the French merchant ship Le Pharaon (The Pharaoh). At only 19 years old, the young Dantès seems destined for success. Although the voyage was successful, the former Captain, Leclère, had fallen ill and died. Dantès relays these events to his patron, M. Morrel, who tells Dantès that he will try to have him named as captain. Dantès rushes off to see his father and then his beloved, the young Catalan woman Mercédès, and the two agree to be married immediately.

=== The engagement and the arrest ===
The marriage never occurs, however. On the very night of their nuptial feast, Dantès is arrested as a suspected Bonapartist rebel, a helper to Napoléon, and taken to see the public prosecutor, Gérard de Villefort. Edmond had been anonymously and falsely denounced by Danglars, Edmond's shipmate over whom he was promoted, and Fernand Mondego, a rival suitor for Mercédès' hand. Prosecutor Villefort concludes that Edmond is innocent and assures him that he will be released. He then asks for a letter, a piece of evidence cited in the complaint denouncing Edmond to the authorities. This claimed that on Edmond's last voyage, he had made a stopover at the island of Elba, and had received a letter from the deposed Emperor Napoléon. Edmond has the letter, which he received in the name of Captain Leclère, and of which the contents are unknown to him, and produces it. Villefort then throws the letter on the fire, for it is addressed to his father. Once again, he promises Edmond's speedy release. Villefort has renounced his father, a staunch Bonapartist, and destroyed the letter to protect himself, not Edmond; to further protect his name, Villefort sentences Edmond to imprisonment in the dreaded Château d'If, an island fortress from which no prisoner had ever escaped, and to which the most dangerous political prisoners are sent.

=== Despair and near-suicide ===
After six long years in solitary confinement in the dungeons of the Château, Edmond decides to commit suicide by starving himself. Fearing he will be forced to eat, he throws out his food in secrecy. After nearly six months, he hears scratching against the wall of his cell. Curiosity about the source of the noise inspires him to begin eating again. He taps on his wall several times, and when the scratching stops, he concludes that it was another prisoner trying to escape. He then uses the saucepan on which his food is served to begin digging where he heard the scratching before in hopes that it was another prisoner digging his way to freedom. Dantès eventually breaks through enough of the wall that he is able to exchange a brief greeting with an old Italian abbé named Faria, sometimes called the "Mad Priest", who had indeed been attempting to dig to freedom.

=== Edmond and the Abbé ===
The two prisoners become very close, with the learned priest teaching Dantès all he knows about reading, mathematics, science, languages, philosophy, history, sword fighting, and economics. Together, they determine who had betrayed Edmond, and although Faria disapproves, Edmond plans vengeance against his betrayers. The two spend years digging a tunnel to freedom, but Faria dies before they can escape. Before Abbe Faria died, he revealed to Edmond a secret treasure, hidden on the island of Monte Cristo. That night, Edmond exchanges himself for his mentor in the priest's bodybag, and escapes from the prison. The jailers, rather than burying prisoners, toss them over the fortress's wall into the sea, weighted with an iron ball chained around the legs. Using a knife made from a sharpened crucifix, Edmond frees himself and reaches the surface. Edmond swims to a small island nearby to seek refuge from a storm for the night. The next day, he swims out to sea as a smuggling ship passes by and is rescued under the pretense of being a shipwreck victim. Edmond soon suggests a stopover and trading of goods at the small island of Monte Cristo, during which he confirms that Faria's treasure exists. On this and subsequent visits, Edmond becomes wealthy.

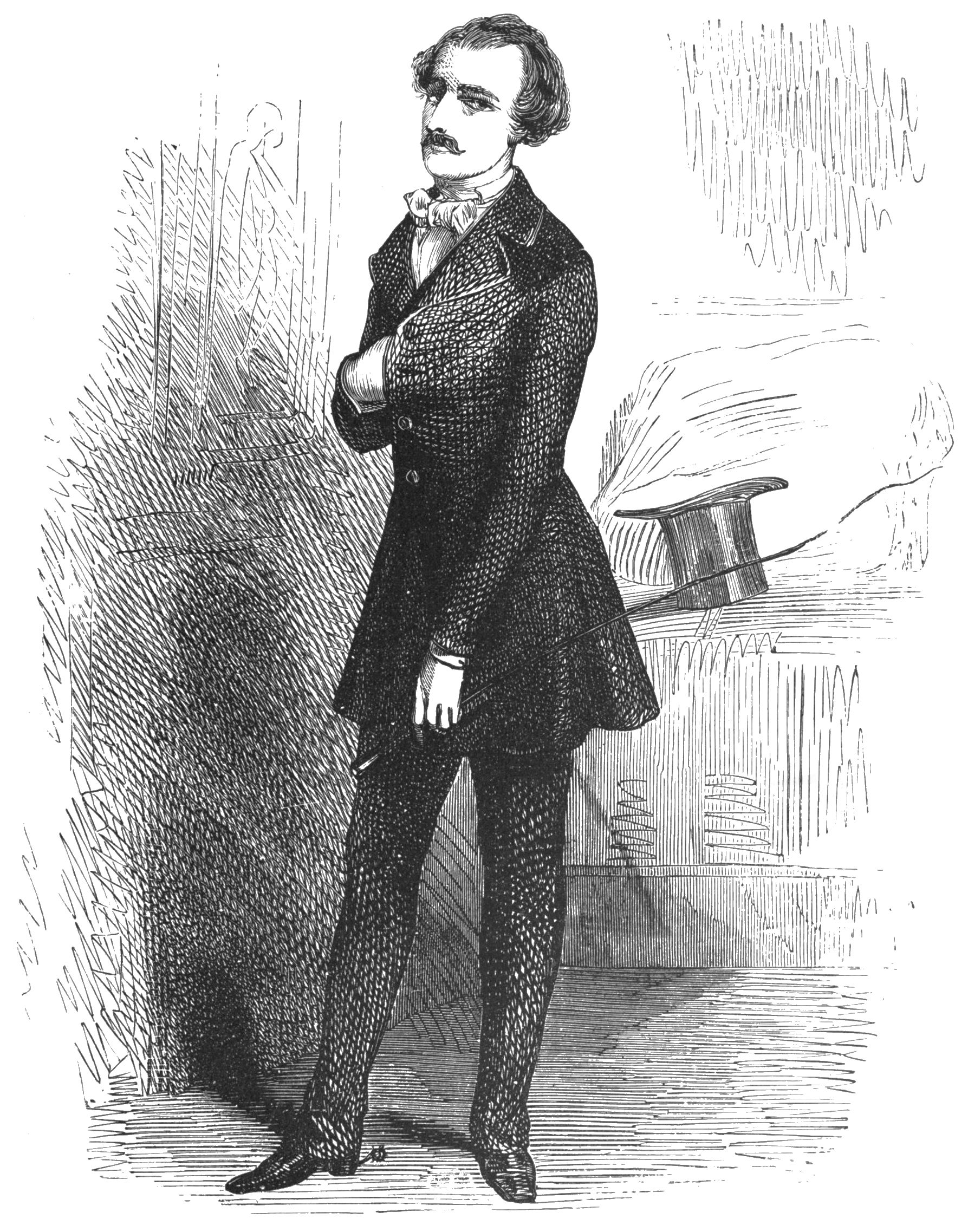
Edmond Dantès after his transformation into the Count of Monte Cristo. Unknown illustrator (1887)

=== Loyalty and betrayal ===
Upon returning to Marseille, Edmond learns that his father has died of hunger and that Mercédès had married Fernand eight months after he was reported to have been executed for treason. His old neighbour Gaspard Caderousse is still alive, and—under the name of the Abbé Busoni—Edmond visits him to learn more. Caderousse tells him that Morrel had tried to obtain a fair trial for Edmond, and how Mercédès pleaded for his release. He also learns that those who had remained loyal to him had suffered greatly, while those who had betrayed him had prospered. Edmond thanks Caderousse for the information, paying him with a large diamond that he said had come into Edmond's possession while in prison. Realizing that only Morrel had remained loyal, Edmond creates three disguises – an Englishman named Lord Wilmore, a clerk from the banking firm Thomson and French, and Sinbad the Sailor – and uses them to save Morrel from bankruptcy and suicide. Edmond then goes into hiding, spending nine years reinventing himself as the Count of Monte Cristo.

=== Paris and the Count ===
Edmond emerges into Parisian society as the mysterious and sophisticated Count of Monte Cristo. Having purchased the deed to the island from whence he obtained his treasure, Edmond is able to place himself in the upper strata of Parisian society and assume the role of one of the most influential men in all of France. As such, he is introduced to several other powerful men, most notably Danglars, who is now a wealthy banker; Mondego, who is now Count de Morcerf and a military hero; and Villefort, who is now the procureur du roi, one of the most powerful lawyers in the country. Furthermore, Mondego has married Mercédès, and the two have a son named Albert. Having established himself in Parisian society, and having distanced himself from Edmond Dantès, the Count is able to formulate his plans of revenge against the men who betrayed him. By the end of the novel, Edmond has exacted his revenge on all of the men who would have seen him rot in prison. He exposes crimes committed by Villefort and Mondego, ruining their respective reputations and bringing the police down upon them; Villefort goes insane, and Mondego commits suicide. He arranges for Danglars to be temporarily captured by the Italian bandit Luigi Vampa, made to understand Edmond's suffering, and stripped of all of his wealth. Edmond, at the end of the novel, departs with his ward Haydée (previously enslaved by Mondego and liberated by Edmond), leaving with words of wisdom: "to wait and hope".

== Portrayal in adaptations ==
James O'Neill, father of playwright Eugene, performed the title role over 6,000 times during his career. Edmond Dantès has been portrayed on television and film many times by actors such as George Dolenz, Alan Badel, Robert Donat, Jean Marais, Louis Jourdan, Gérard Depardieu, Richard Chamberlain, Jim Caviezel and, most recently, Pierre Niney and Sam Claflin. Dantès has also been portrayed on stage, including in a musical adaptation of the novel.

In the Japanese animated television series Gankutsuou: The Count of Monte Cristo, he is voiced by Jōji Nakata in the Japanese version and by Jamieson Price in the English one.

There are also at least three adaptations into television soap operas, the last of which being the 2006 Mexican series Montecristo.

In 2011, ABC debuted the television drama Revenge, billed as a loose adaptation of Dumas's The Count of Monte Cristo. In it, the character of Dantès is converted into a female protagonist by the name of Emily Thorne (portrayed by actress Emily VanCamp).

Edmond is portrayed as an Avenger-class Servant in the popular mobile game, Fate/Grand Order, where his character is designed for the game by Rui Komatsuzaki and voiced by Nobunaga Shimazaki. In 2024 he received a second Avenger-class variation designed by Routo Usagi.

Craig Horner portrays the Count of Monte Cristo in the second episode of the sixth season of Once Upon a Time. In the series, Edmond seeks revenge on Baron Danglars for burning down his village and murdering his fiancée. Edmond manages to kill him at a party. Afterwards, he is approached by the Evil Queen Regina who was impressed with his vengeance and hires Edmond to kill Snow White and Prince Charming. Edmond poses as a victim of the Queen and becomes Snow and Charming's wine steward, but he is hesitant to kill them after he discovers they are nice people. Edmond nonetheless prepares to poison the royal couple. As Rumplestiltskin needs them alive for his own purposes, he poisons Snow and Charming's handmaiden Charlotte, whom Edmond has fallen in love with, with poison from the Agrabahn Vipers. This forces Edmond to take Charlotte to the Land of Untold Stories where their story "cannot play out". Years later, the Evil Queen has redeemed but because of Dr. Jekyll's serum, Regina and the Queen are two separate people. Edmond is among the inhabitants of the Land of Untold Stories that are emigrated to Storybrooke with Charlotte dying from the poison. The Evil Queen takes Edmond's heart to try to force him to kill Snow and Charming. This left Regina with no choice but to kill Edmond by throwing her sword into his back.

In 2024, two adaptations of the novel were produced, first getting released as a French feature film, Le Comte de Monte-Cristo, starring Pierre Niney, and later, an English-language television miniseries, The Count of Monte Cristo, starring Sam Claflin.

== References in other films ==
The 1949 film Treasure of Monte Cristo tells the story of a descendant of Edmond Dantès who is also framed for a crime he did not commit.

Edmond Dantès was referenced in the final scenes of V for Vendetta (2005); protagonist Evey Hammond describes terrorist V as Edmond Dantès after he martyrs himself to bring down the tyrannical Norsefire government. Earlier in the movie, V and Evey watch the 1934 film adaptation of The Count of Monte Cristo, which V states is his favourite movie.

Writer/director John Hughes used Edmond Dantès as his pseudonym late in his career.

== Sources ==
The story of Dantès' imprisonment in the Château d'If was almost certainly inspired by the imprisonment of general Thomas-Alexandre Dumas (Alexandre Dumas, père's own father) in a dungeon fortress in Taranto, Italy, in 1799–1801. Another source of inspiration may have been the true crime story of Pierre Picaud, a french shoemaker who was falsely imprisoned in 1807.
