= Pierre-Gustave Staal =

French artist and draughtsman (1917–1882)

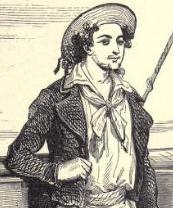
Cropped image of Edmond Dantès illustration by Pierre Gustave Eugene Staal.

Pierre-Gustave-Eugène Staal (2 September 1817 in Vertus – 19 October 1882 in Ivry), was a French artist, lithographer, illustrator and draughtsman.

He entered the workshop of painter Paul Delaroche at the École des Beaux-Arts in 1838, and then learned engraving with Adolphe Varin in 1845. He provided the artwork for several engraved works (Les Femmes de M. de Balzac, types, caractères et portraits 1851; Chants et chansons by Pierre Dupont, 1851–59); for illustrated periodicals (Musée des familles, Magasin pittoresque); for novels (La Comédie humaine, by Honoré de Balzac, 1842–1846; Œuvres illustrées de Balzac, 1851–1853; Les Mystères de Paris, by Eugène Sue, 1843–1844; Corinne ou l'Italie, by Mme de Staël, 1853); and for books for children (Contes du docteur Sam, by Henry Berthoud, 1862; Le Magasin des enfants, by Mme Leprince de Beaumont, 1865; Les Contes de tous les pays, by Emile Chasles, 1867). He also did drawings for Muses et Fées, histoire des femmes mythologiques, by Joseph Méry and Count Foelix (1851) and for the volume of the Chants et chansons populaires de France (Garnier brothers editors, 1848).

Staal drew several portraits of women intended for engraving (Les Femmes de la Bible, collection de portraits des femmes remarquables de l'Ancien et du Nouveau Testament, by Monsignor Georges Darboy, 1846; Galerie des femmes célèbres, tirée des Causeries du lundi par Sainte-Beuve, 1859; Les Etoiles du monde. Galerie historique des femmes les plus célèbres de tous les temps et de tous les pays, ouvrage collectif, 1858). He also carried out some lithographs (Souvenir de première communion; Album de La Chronique illustrée, guerre et Commune). He also did some paintings (Visitation, 1864; Lucifer, 1868; La Famille malheureuse).
