= La Valentina =

La Valentina may refer to:

- "La Valentina" (corrido), revolutionary ballad
- La Valentina (1938 film), starring Jorge Negrete and Esperanza Baur
- La Valentina (1966 film), starring María Félix and Eulalio González
- Pancho Villa y la Valentina (1960 film), starring Pedro Armendáriz and Elsa Aguirre
