= John Wayne =

American actor (1907–1979)

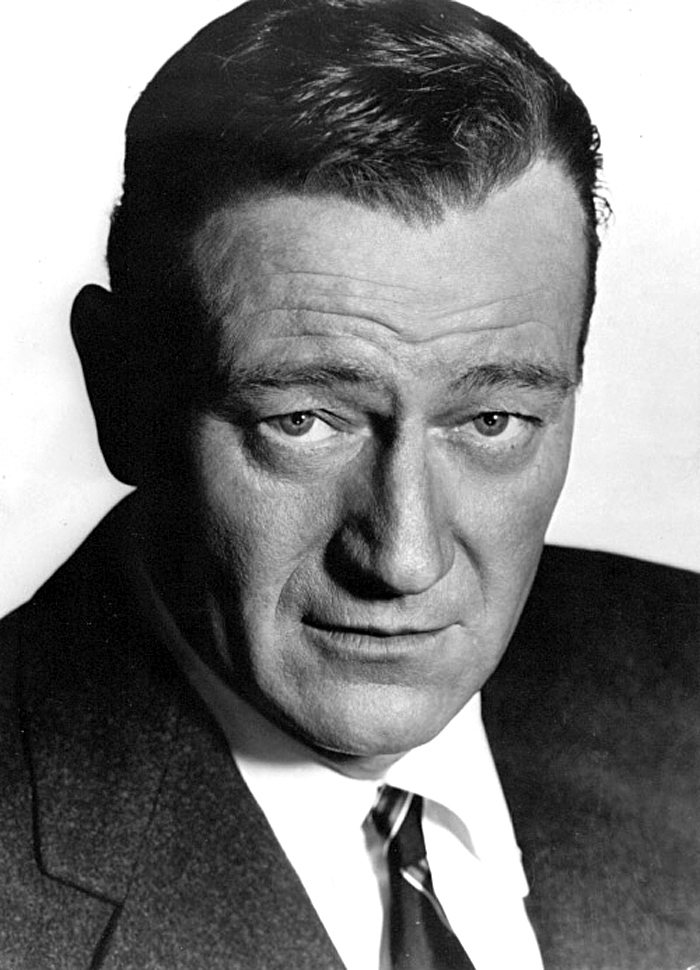
- Wayne c. 1965
- Born: Marion Robert Morrison; May 26, 1907; Winterset, Iowa, U.S.
- Died: June 11, 1979 (aged 72); Los Angeles, California, U.S.
- Resting place: Pacific View Memorial Park; 33.60953°N 117.85336°W
- Other names: Marion Michael Morrison; Duke Morrison
- Occupations: Actor; producer; director
- Years active: 1926–1979
- Political party: Republican
- Spouses: Josephine Sáenz (m. 1933; div. 1945) Esperanza Baur (m. 1946; div. 1954) Pilar Pallete (m. 1954)
- Children: 7, including Michael, Patrick, and Ethan
- Awards: Presidential Medal of Freedom; Congressional Gold Medal; Hollywood Walk of Fame
- Website: Official website

Marion Robert Morrison (Note: After Wayne gained fame under his stage name, studio publicists erroneously referred to his birth name as Marion Michael Morrison; Wayne went along with this himself, because he "really liked the name Michael". The error appeared in virtually every biography of Wayne until Roberts and Olson uncovered the facts in their 1995 biography John Wayne: American, drawing on the draft of Wayne's unfinished autobiography among other sources.) (May 26, 1907 – June 11, 1979), known professionally as John Wayne, was an American actor. Nicknamed "Duke", he became a popular icon through his starring roles in films which were produced during Hollywood's Golden Age, especially in Western and war movies. His career flourished from the silent film era of the 1920s to the American New Wave in the 1970s, as he appeared in a total of 179 film and television productions. He was among the top box-office draws for three decades, and appeared with many other important Hollywood stars of his era. In 1999, the American Film Institute selected Wayne as one of the greatest male stars of classic American cinema.

Wayne was born in Winterset, Iowa, but grew up in Southern California. After losing his football scholarship to the University of Southern California due to a bodysurfing accident, he began working for the Fox Film Corporation. He appeared mostly in small parts, but gained a leading role in Raoul Walsh's Western The Big Trail (1930), an early widescreen film epic that was a box-office failure. He played leading roles in numerous B movies during the 1930s, most of them Westerns, without becoming a major name. John Ford's Stagecoach (1939) made Wayne a mainstream star, and he starred in 142 motion pictures altogether. According to biographer Ronald Davis, "John Wayne personified for millions the nation's frontier heritage".

Wayne's other roles in Westerns included a cattleman driving his herd on the Chisholm Trail in Red River (1948); a Civil War veteran whose niece is abducted by Comanches in The Searchers (1956); a troubled rancher competing with a lawyer (James Stewart) for a woman's hand in The Man Who Shot Liberty Valance (1962); and a cantankerous one-eyed marshal in True Grit (1969), for which he received the Academy Award for Best Actor. Wayne is also remembered for his roles in The Quiet Man (1952) with Maureen O'Hara; Rio Bravo (1959) with Dean Martin; and The Longest Day (1962). In his final screen performance, he starred as an aging gunfighter suffering from cancer in The Shootist (1976).

Wayne made his last public appearance at the Academy Awards ceremony on April 9, 1979, and died of stomach cancer two months later. In 1980, he was posthumously awarded the Presidential Medal of Freedom, the highest civilian honor of the United States.

== Early life and education ==
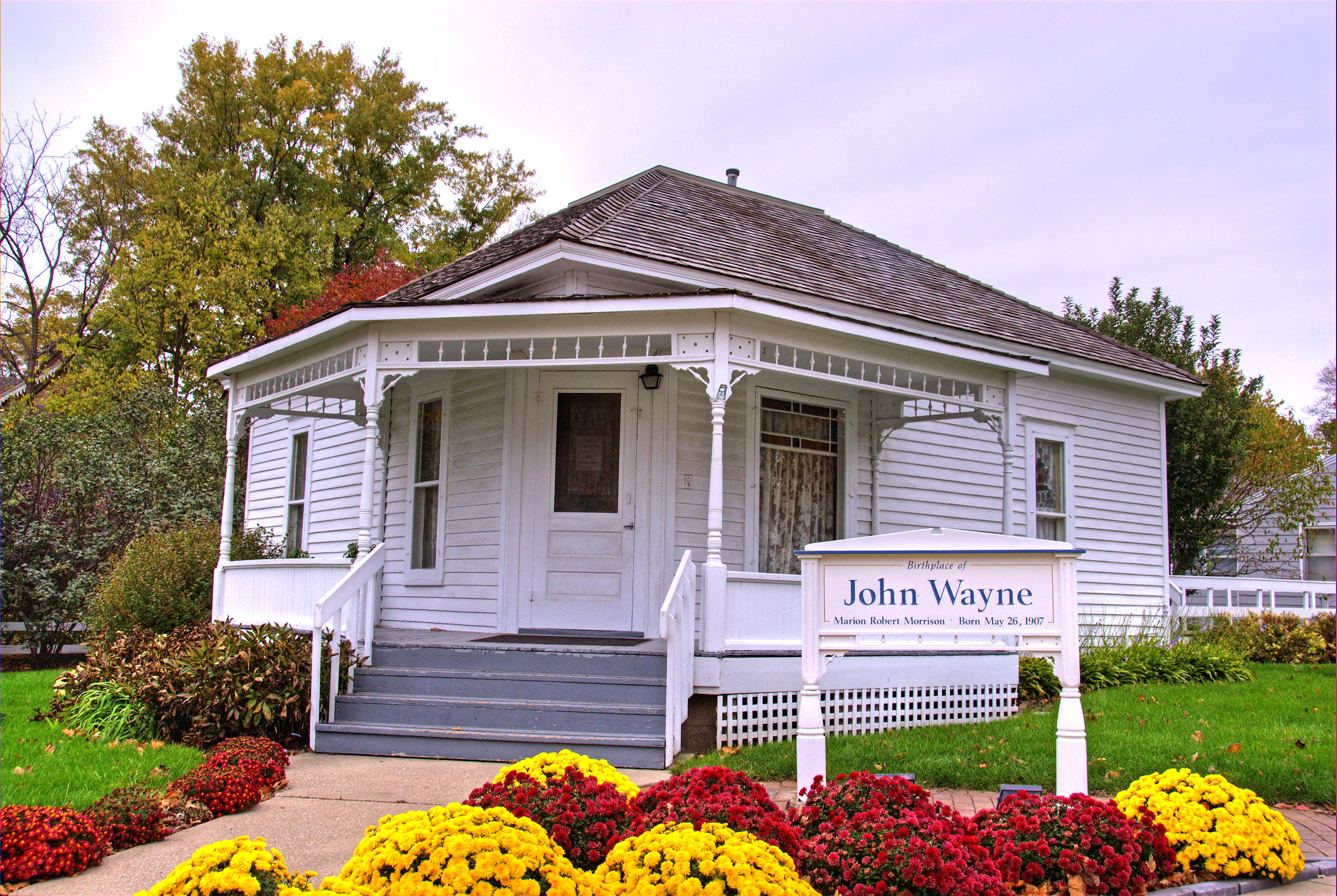
The house in Winterset, Iowa, where Wayne was born

Wayne was born as Marion Robert Morrison on May 26, 1907, at 224 South Second Street in Winterset, Iowa. The local paper, Winterset Madisonian, reported on page 4 of its May 30, 1907 edition that he weighed 13 lb (around 6 kg) at birth. Wayne later claimed that his middle name was changed from Robert to Michael when his parents decided to give the name Robert to their next son, but extensive research has found no record of a legal change. His legal name apparently remained Marion Robert Morrison throughout his life, although his original name is almost always referred to as Marion Michael Morrison.

Wayne's father, Clyde Leonard Morrison (1884–1937), was the son of Marion Mitchell Morrison (1845–1915), a Union Army veteran of the American Civil War. His mother, Mary "Molly" Alberta Brown (1885–1970), was from Lancaster County, Nebraska. Wayne had Scottish, Scotch-Irish, English, and Irish ancestry. His great-great-grandfather Robert Morrison (b. 1782) left County Antrim, Ireland, with his mother, arriving in New York in 1799 and later settling in Adams County, Ohio. The Morrisons were originally from the Isle of Lewis in the Outer Hebrides, Scotland. Wayne was raised Presbyterian.

The family moved to Palmdale, California, and in 1916 to Glendale, where they lived at 404 Isabel Street and his father worked as a pharmacist. Wayne attended Wilson Middle School and then Glendale Union High School, where he performed well in both sports and academics. He played on the school's football team and joined its debating team. He was president of the Latin Society and contributed to the school's newspaper sports column.

A local fireman on his route to school began calling him "Little Duke" because he was always accompanied by his large Airedale Terrier, Duke. Wayne preferred "Duke" to "Marion", and the nickname stayed with him. As a teenager, he worked in an ice-cream shop owned by a man who shod horses for Hollywood studios. He was active in the Order of DeMolay and was later inducted into its Hall of Fame. He played football for the 1924 league-champion Glendale High School team.

Wayne applied to the U.S. Naval Academy but was not accepted because of poor grades. He instead attended the University of Southern California (USC), majoring in pre-law. He was a member of the Trojan Knights and Sigma Chi fraternity. Standing at 6 feet 4 1/2 inches (1.94 metres) tall, he played on the USC Trojans football team under coach Howard Jones. A broken collarbone curtailed his athletic career, and Wayne later said he was too afraid of Jones's reaction to admit that the injury had occurred during a bodysurfing accident. He lost his athletic scholarship and, without funds, left the university.

== Career ==
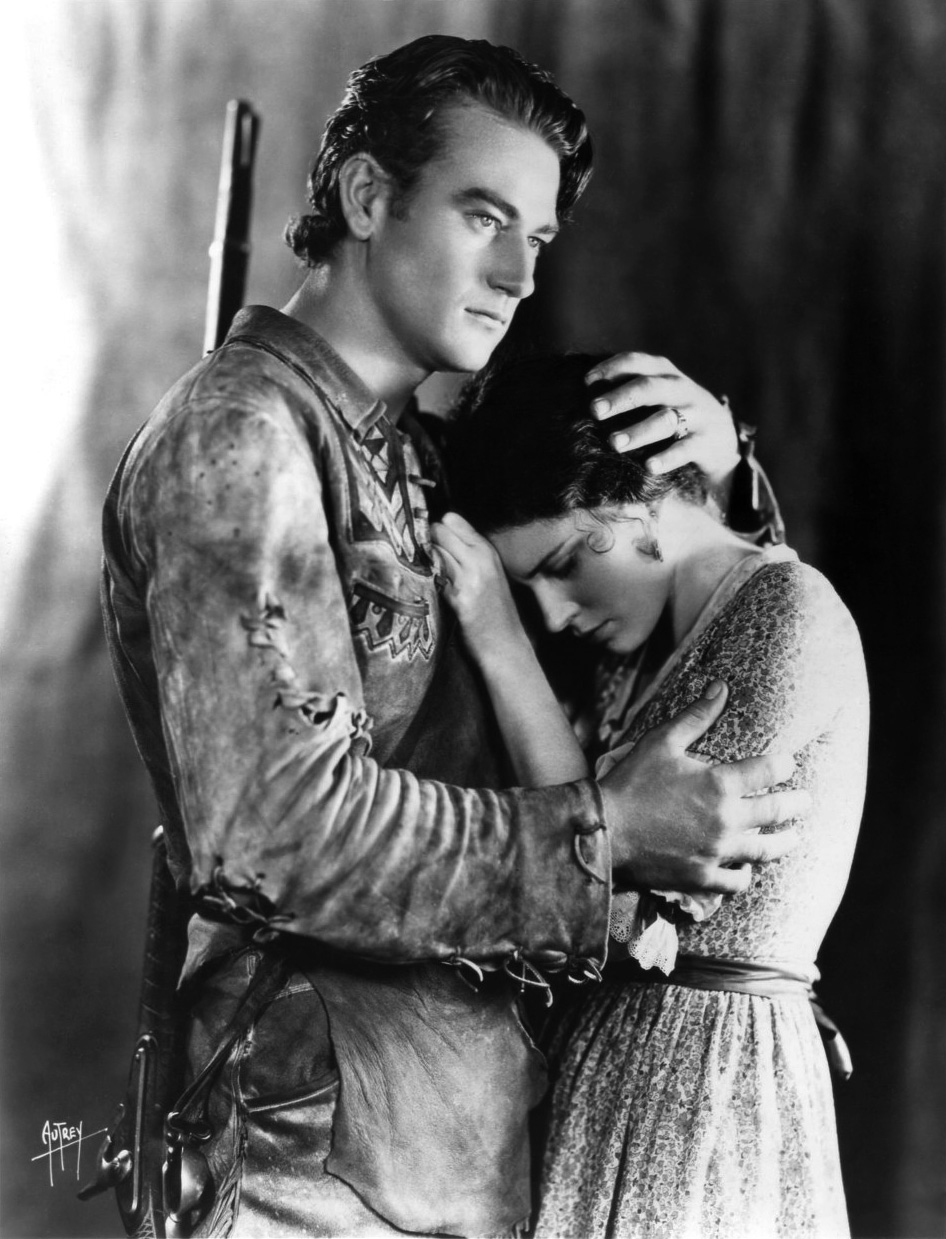
Wayne with Marguerite Churchill in the widescreen The Big Trail (1930), his first role as a leading man

=== Early works and first lead role ===
As a favor to coach Jones, who had given silent Western film star Tom Mix tickets to USC games, director John Ford and Mix hired Wayne as a prop boy and extra. Wayne later credited his walk, talk, and persona to his acquaintance with Wyatt Earp, who was good friends with Mix. Wayne soon moved to bit parts, establishing a longtime friendship with Ford, who provided most of those roles. Early in this period, he had a minor, uncredited role as a guard in the 1926 film Bardelys the Magnificent. He also appeared with his USC teammates playing football in Brown of Harvard (1926), The Dropkick (1927), Salute (1929), and Columbia's Maker of Men (filmed in 1930, released in 1931). While working for Fox Film Corporation in bit roles, Wayne received on-screen credit as "Duke Morrison" only once, in Words and Music (1929). Director Raoul Walsh saw him moving studio furniture while working as a prop boy and cast him in his first starring role in The Big Trail (1930). Walsh suggested "Anthony Wayne" as a screen name, after Revolutionary War General "Mad" Anthony Wayne. Fox Studios chief Winfield Sheehan rejected it as sounding "too Italian". Walsh then suggested "John Wayne". Sheehan agreed, and the name was set. Wayne was not present for the discussion. His pay was raised to $105 a week.

The Big Trail was intended as the first big‑budget outdoor spectacle of the sound era, made at a then‑staggering cost of $1.25 million ($25.08 million equivalent in 2026), using hundreds of extras and wide vistas of the American Southwest, still largely unpopulated at the time. To take advantage of the scenery, it was filmed in two versions: a standard 35 mm version and another in the new 70 mm Grandeur film process, using an innovative camera and lenses. Many in the audience who saw it in Grandeur stood and cheered, but only a handful of theaters were equipped to show the film in its widescreen format, and the effort was largely wasted. The film was considered a major box‑office failure at the time, but later came to be highly regarded by modern critics.

=== Subsequent films and breakthrough ===
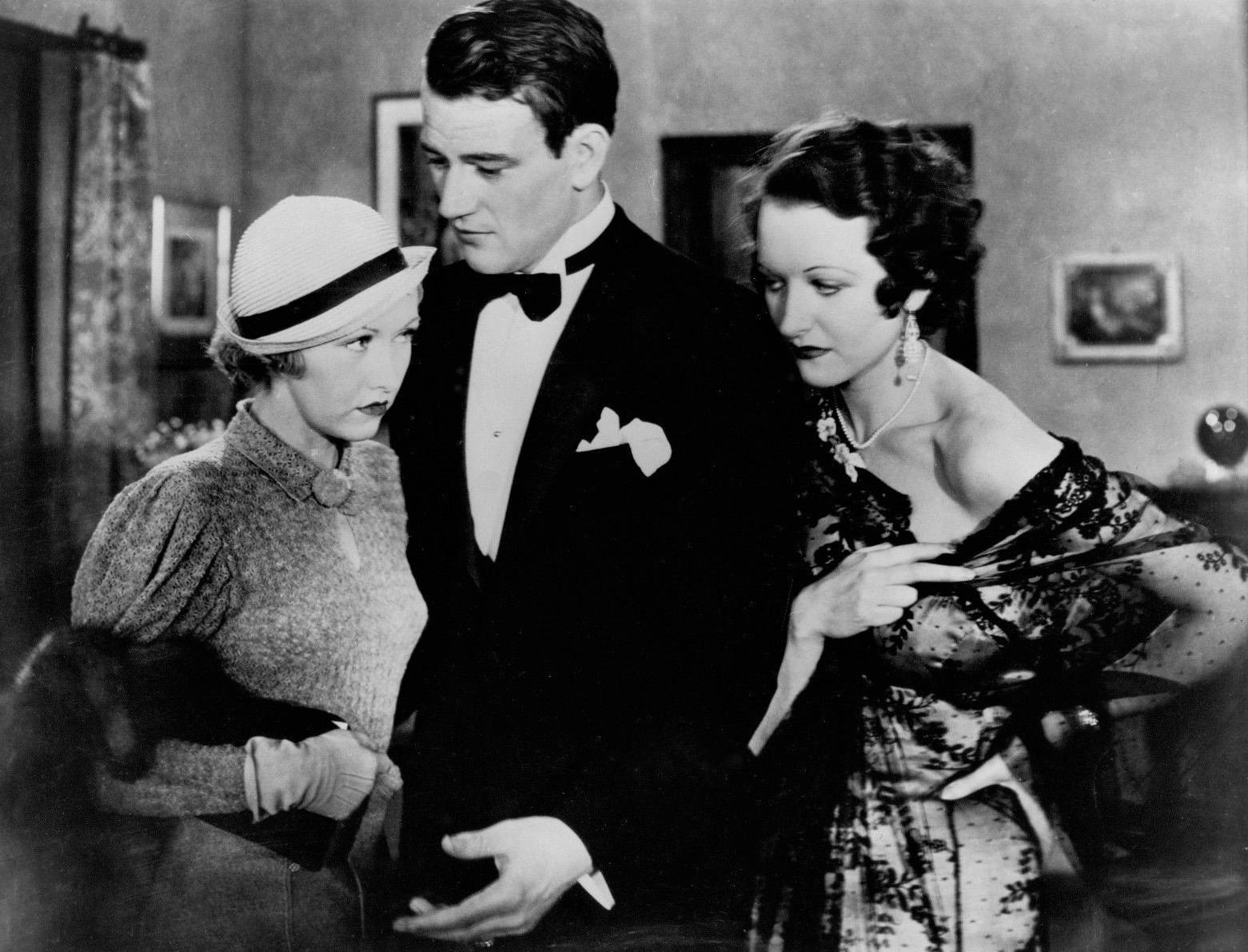
Wayne with Evalyn Knapp and Natalie Kingston in His Private Secretary (1933)

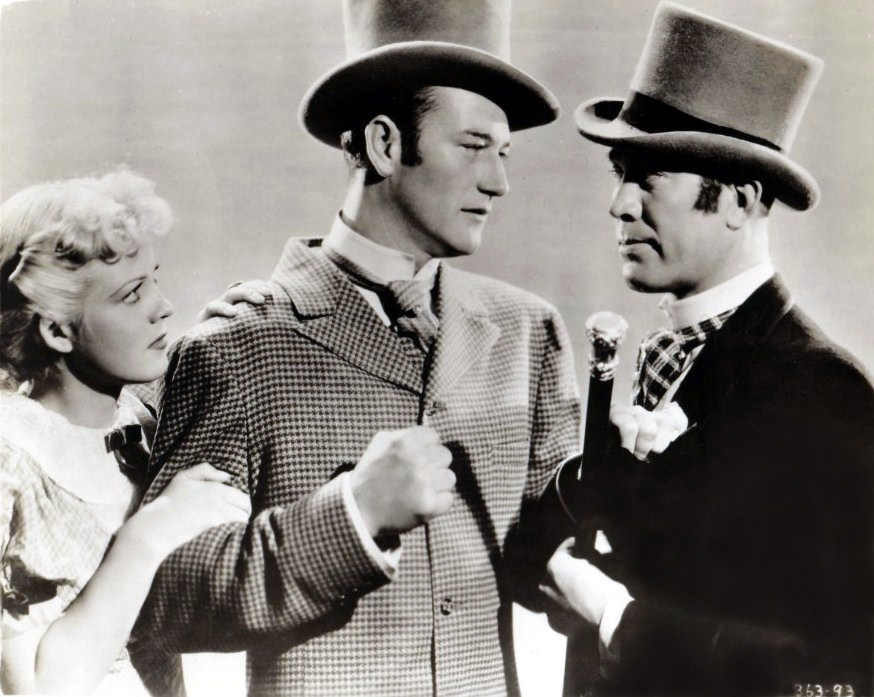
Wayne with Jean Rogers and Ward Bond in Conflict (1936)

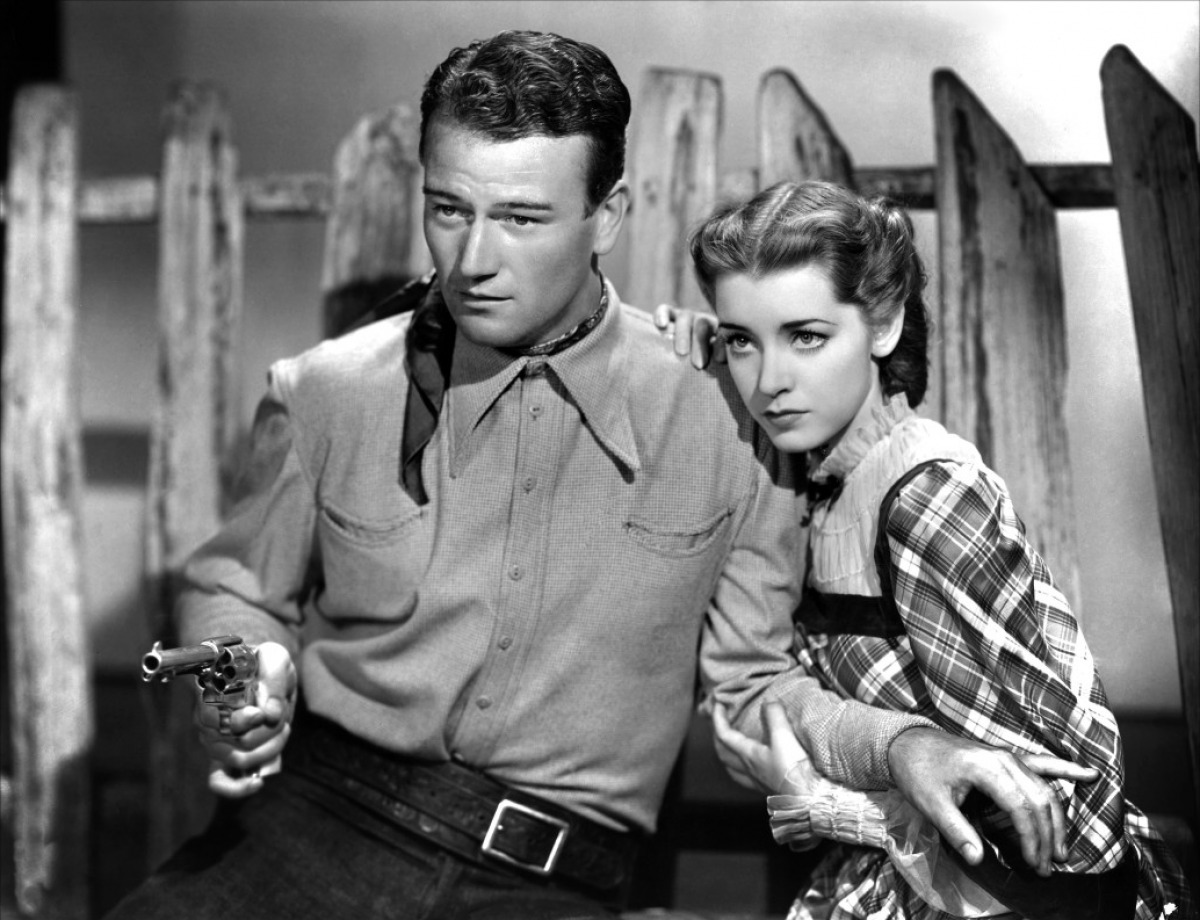
Wayne with Marsha Hunt in Born to the West (1937)

After the commercial failure of The Big Trail, Wayne was relegated to small roles in A pictures, including Columbia's The Deceiver (1931), in which he played a corpse. From 1932 to 1933, he starred in six B movie Westerns for Leon Schlesinger Productions and Warner Bros. Pictures. Wayne disliked their constant reuse of footage starring Ken Maynard and their extremely cheap production value, which reflected Schlesinger's focus on his more successful Looney Tunes and Merrie Melodies animated film series.

Wayne appeared in the serial The Three Musketeers (1933), an updated version of the Alexandre Dumas novel in which the protagonists were soldiers in the French Foreign Legion in then-contemporary North Africa. He played the lead, with his name over the title, in many low-budget Poverty Row Westerns, mostly at Monogram Pictures, and in serials for Mascot Pictures Corporation. By Wayne's own estimation, he appeared in about 80 of these horse operas from 1930 to 1939. In Riders of Destiny (1933), he became one of the first singing cowboys of film, albeit via dubbing. He also appeared in some of the Three Mesquiteers Westerns, whose title was a play on the Dumas classic.

He was mentored by stuntmen in riding and other Western skills. Stuntman Yakima Canutt and Wayne developed and perfected stunts and onscreen fisticuffs techniques that are still in use. One of Wayne's main innovations in these early Poverty Row Westerns was allowing heroes to fight as convincingly as villains, by not always making them fight clean. Wayne said, "Before I came along, it was standard practice that the hero must always fight clean. The heavy was allowed to hit the hero in the head with a chair or throw a kerosene lamp at him or kick him in the stomach, but the hero could only knock the villain down politely and then wait until he rose. I changed all that. I threw chairs and lamps. I fought hard and I fought dirty. I fought to win".

Wayne's second breakthrough role came with John Ford's Stagecoach (1939). Because of Wayne's B movie status and track record in low-budget Westerns throughout the 1930s, Ford had difficulty securing financing for what was intended as an A‑budget film. After rejection by all the major studios, Ford struck a deal with independent producer Walter Wanger in which Claire Trevor—a much bigger star at the time—received top billing. Stagecoach was a major critical and financial success, and Wayne became a mainstream star. Cast member Louise Platt later credited Ford as saying that Wayne would become the biggest star ever because of his appeal as the archetypal "everyman".

=== 1940s ===
Wayne with Joan Blondell in Lady for a Night (1942)

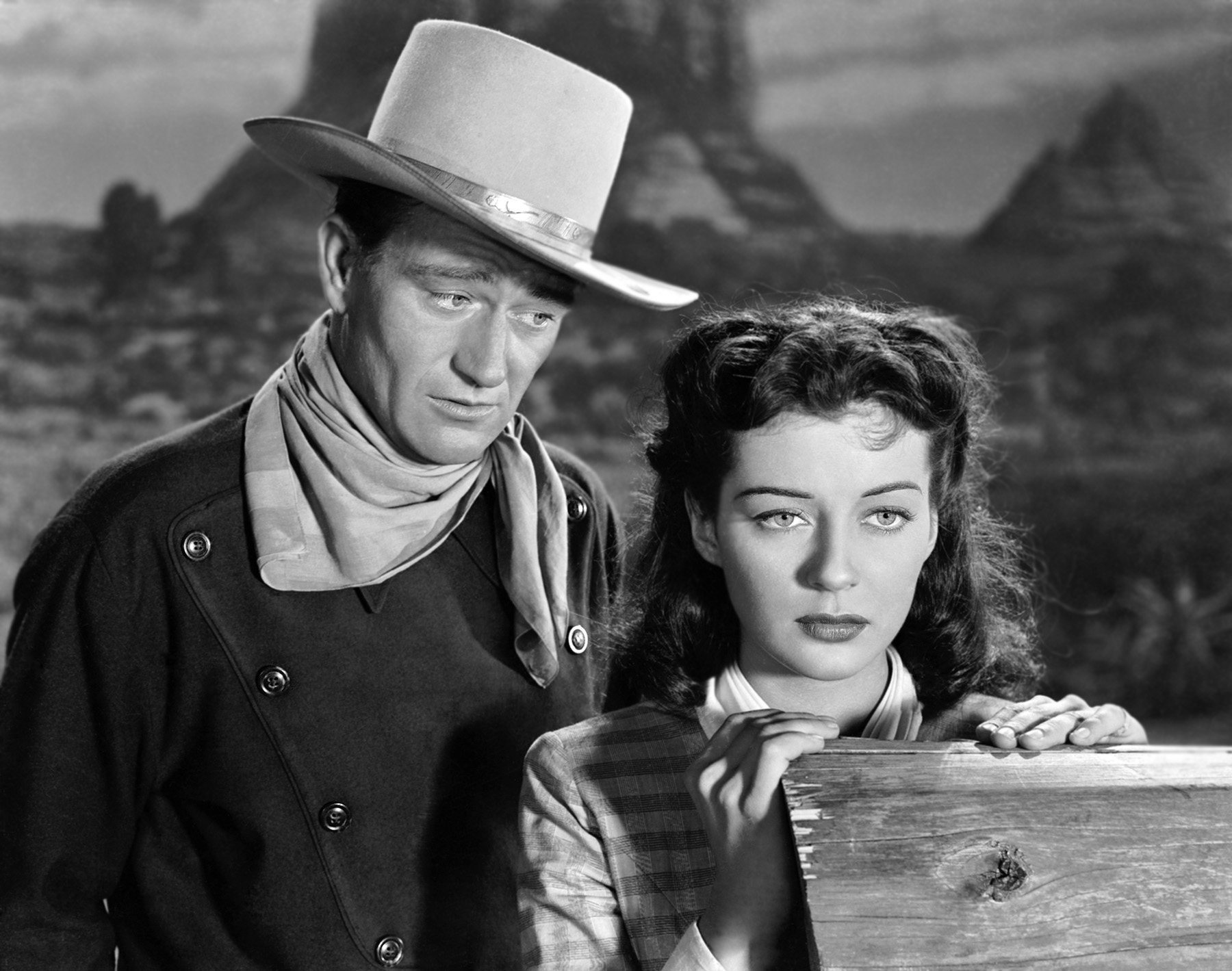
Wayne with Gail Russell in Angel and the Badman (1947)

Wayne (right) acting in a short clip from Angel and the Badman (1947) (click to play)

America's entry into World War II brought widespread support for the war effort from all sectors of society, and Hollywood was no exception. Wayne was exempted from service due to his age (34 at the time of Pearl Harbor) and his family status (classified as 3-A, family deferment). He repeatedly wrote to Ford saying he wanted to enlist, at one point asking whether he could join Ford's military unit. Wayne did not attempt to prevent his reclassification as 1-A (draft eligible), but Republic Studios was strongly opposed to losing him, as he was their only A-list actor under contract. Herbert J. Yates, president of Republic, threatened Wayne with a lawsuit if he left his contract, and Republic Pictures intervened in the Selective Service process, requesting his further deferment.

U.S. National Archives records indicate that Wayne applied to serve in the Office of Strategic Services (OSS), precursor to the modern CIA, but his bid was unsuccessful. Wayne toured U.S. bases and hospitals in the South Pacific for three months in 1943 and 1944 with the United Service Organizations (USO). During this trip, he carried out a request from William J. Donovan, head of the OSS, to assess whether General Douglas MacArthur, commander of the South West Pacific Area, or his staff were hindering OSS operations. Donovan later issued Wayne an OSS Certificate of Service to memorialize his contribution to the OSS mission. By many accounts, his failure to serve in the military later became the most painful part of his life. His widow later suggested that his patriotism in later decades stemmed from guilt, writing: "He would become a 'superpatriot' for the rest of his life trying to atone for staying home."

Wayne's first color film was The Shepherd of the Hills (1941), in which he co-starred with his longtime friend Harry Carey. The following year, he appeared in his only film directed by Cecil B. DeMille, the Technicolor epic Reap the Wild Wind (1942), co-starring with Ray Milland and Paulette Goddard; it was one of the rare occasions in which he played a character with questionable values.

Like most Hollywood stars of his era, Wayne appeared as a guest on radio programs such as The Hedda Hopper Show and The Louella Parsons Show. He made a number of dramatic appearances, mainly recreations of his own film roles, on programs including Screen Directors Playhouse and Lux Radio Theatre. For six months in 1942, Wayne starred in his own radio adventure series, Three Sheets to the Wind, produced by film director Tay Garnett. In the series, an international spy-detective drama, Wayne played Dan O'Brien, a detective who used alcoholism as a mask for his investigatory work. Garnett intended the show as a pilot of sorts for a film version, though the motion picture was never made. No episodes featuring Wayne appear to have survived, though a demonstration episode with Brian Donlevy in the leading role does exist. Wayne, not Donlevy, played the role throughout the series' run on NBC.

Director Robert Rossen offered Wayne the starring role in All the King's Men (1949), but Wayne refused, believing the script to be "un-American in many ways." Broderick Crawford, who was eventually cast in the role, won the 1949 Oscar for Best Actor, ironically beating Wayne, who had been nominated for Sands of Iwo Jima (1949).

=== 1950s ===
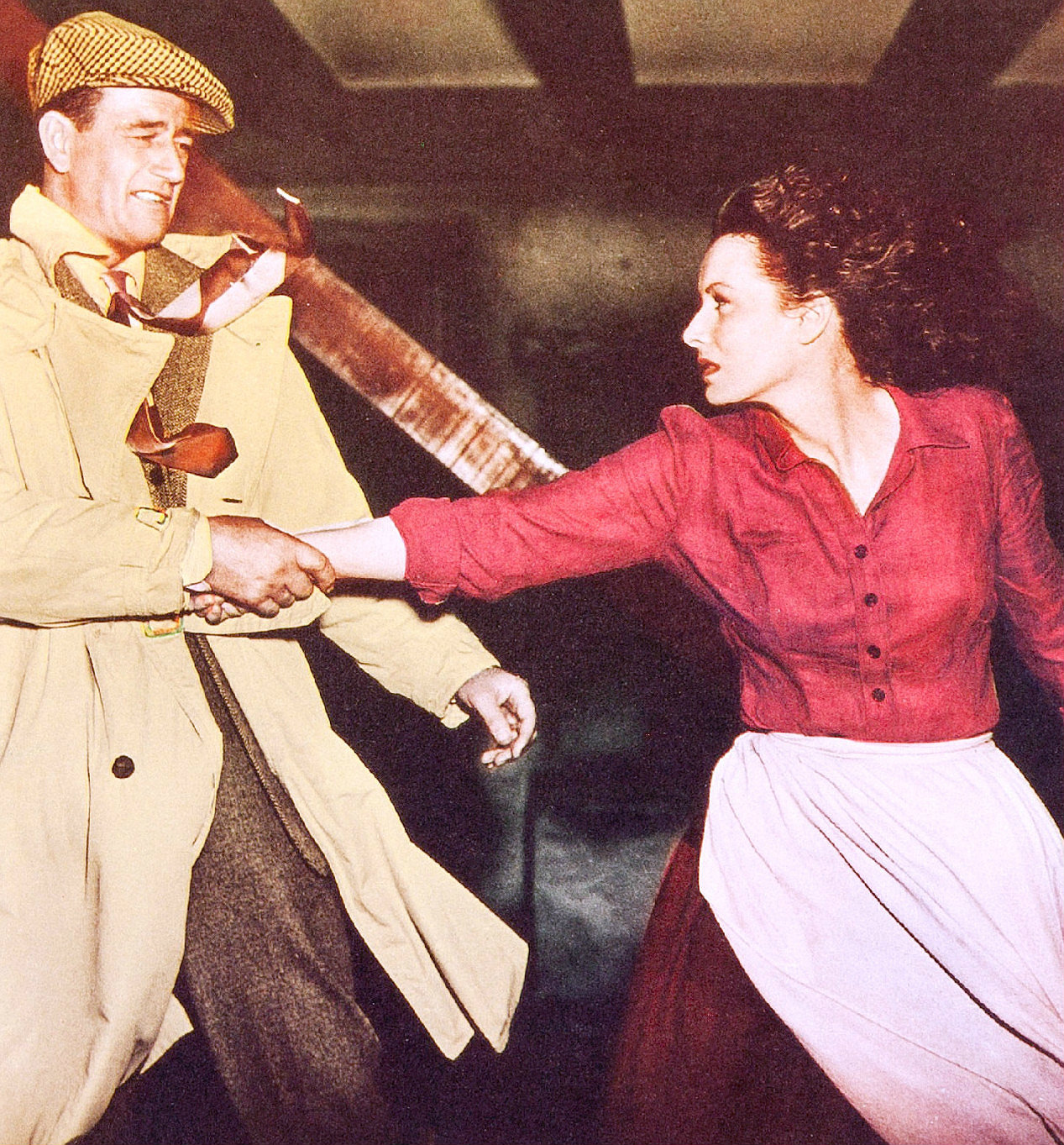
Wayne with Maureen O'Hara in The Quiet Man (1952)

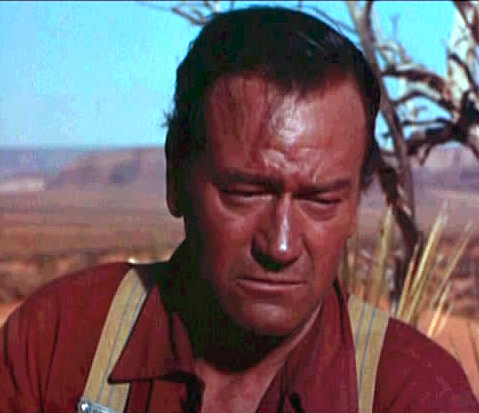
Wayne in The Searchers (1956)

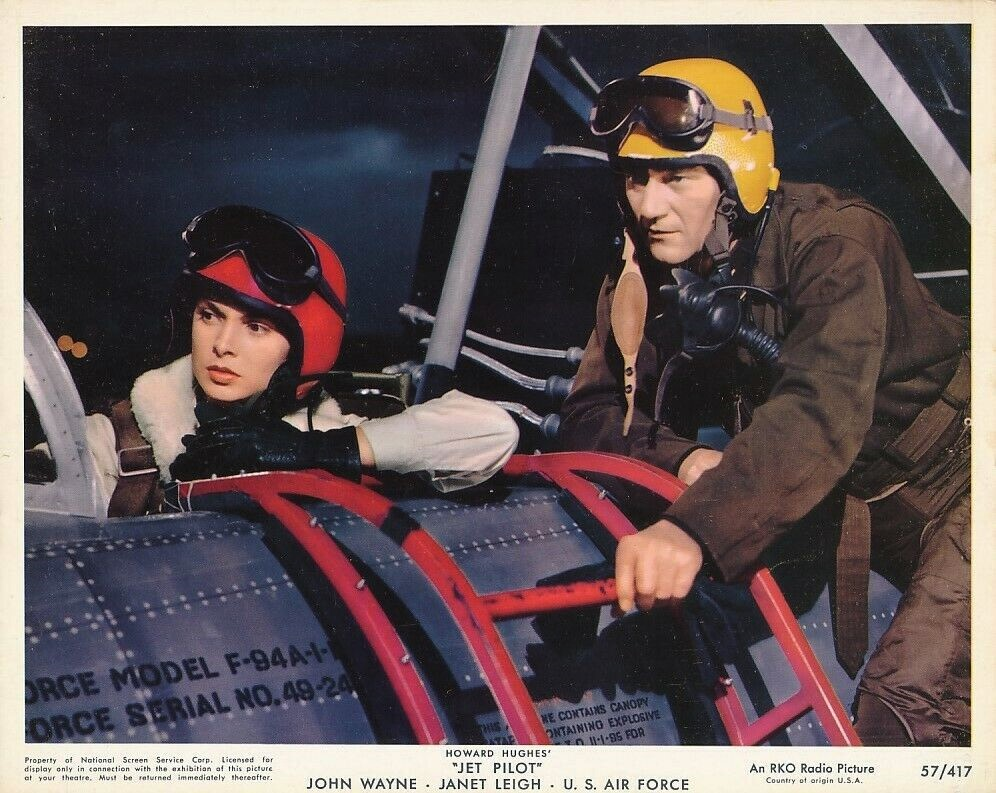
Wayne with Janet Leigh in Jet Pilot (1957)

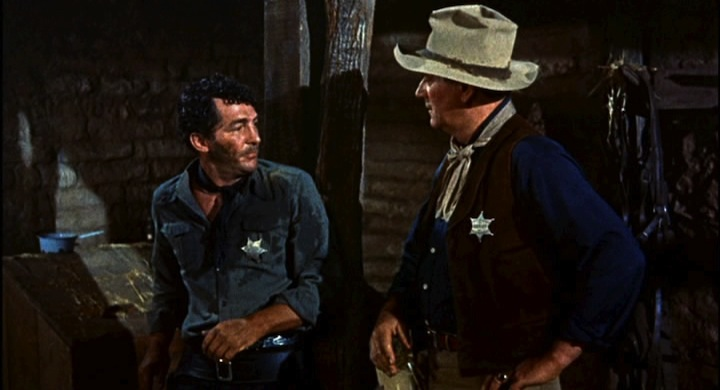
Wayne with Dean Martin in Rio Bravo (1958)

Wayne lost the leading role of Jimmy Ringo in The Gunfighter (1950) to Gregory Peck because he refused to work for Columbia Pictures. Its chief, Harry Cohn, had mistreated him years earlier when he was a young contract player. Cohn had bought the project for Wayne, but Wayne's grudge was too deep, and Cohn sold the script to Twentieth Century Fox, which cast Peck in the role Wayne wanted but for which he refused to bend.

Batjac, the production company co-founded by Wayne in 1952, was named after the fictional shipping company Batjak in Wake of the Red Witch (1948), based on the novel by Garland Roark. A spelling error by Wayne's secretary was allowed to stand, accounting for the variation. Batjac (and its predecessor, Wayne-Fellows Productions) was the arm through which Wayne produced many films for himself and other stars. Its best-known non-Wayne productions were Seven Men From Now (1956), which began the classic collaboration between director Budd Boetticher and star Randolph Scott, and Gun the Man Down (1956) with contract player James Arness as an outlaw.

One of Wayne's most popular roles was in The High and the Mighty (1954), directed by William Wellman and based on a novel by Ernest K. Gann. His portrayal of a heroic copilot won widespread acclaim. Wayne also portrayed aviators in Flying Tigers (1942), Flying Leathernecks (1951), Island in the Sky (1953), The Wings of Eagles (1957), and Jet Pilot (1957).

He appeared in nearly two dozen of John Ford's films over 20 years, including She Wore a Yellow Ribbon (1949), The Quiet Man (1952), and The Searchers (1956). The latter was the first film in which he called someone "Pilgrim", and is often considered to contain his finest and most complex performance.

On May 14, 1958, Hal Kanter's I Married a Woman starring George Gobel and Diana Dors had its Los Angeles opening. Wayne appeared in a cameo as himself. On October 2, John Huston's The Barbarian and the Geisha, in which Wayne played the lead and clashed with Huston throughout production, had its New York opening.

Howard Hawks's Rio Bravo premiered on March 18, 1959. Wayne played the lead, supported by Dean Martin, Ricky Nelson, Angie Dickinson, Walter Brennan, and Ward Bond. Ford's The Horse Soldiers had its world premiere in Shreveport, Louisiana on June 18. Set during the Civil War, Wayne shared the lead with William Holden.

Wayne notoriously portrayed Genghis Khan in The Conqueror (1956), which was panned by critics.

=== 1960s ===
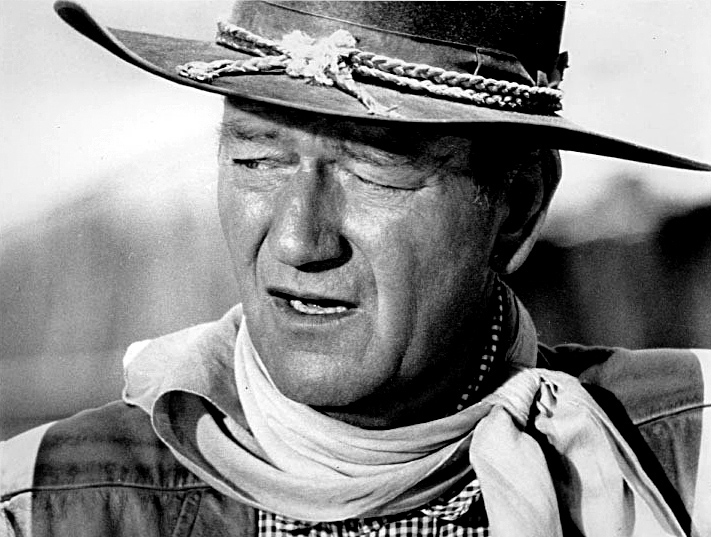
Wayne in The Comancheros (1961)

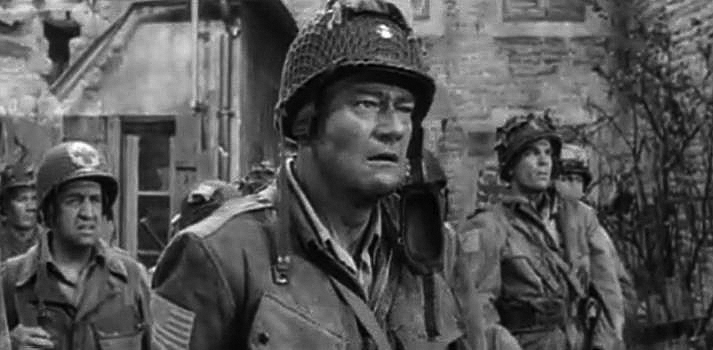
Wayne in The Longest Day (1962)

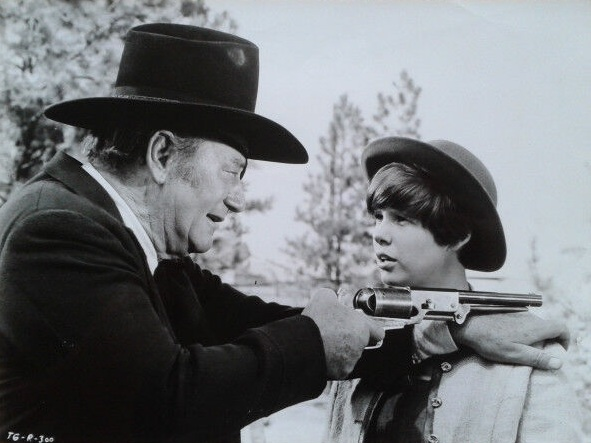
Wayne with Kim Darby in True Grit (1969)

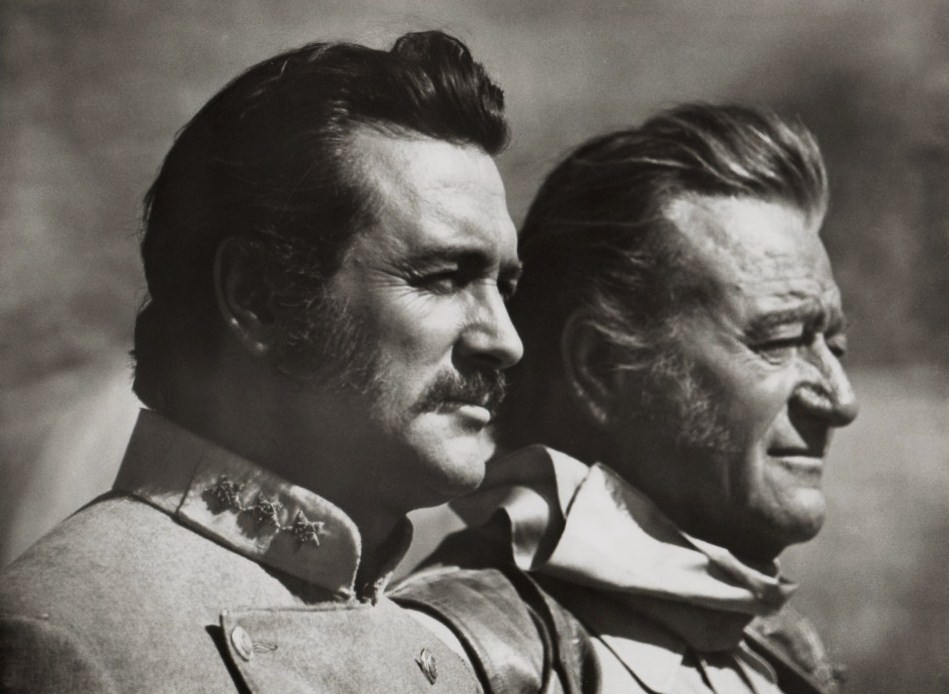
Wayne with Rock Hudson in The Undefeated (1969)

In 1960, Wayne directed and produced The Alamo, his directorial debut, portraying Davy Crockett, with Richard Widmark as Jim Bowie. Wayne was nominated for an Oscar as the producer in the Best Picture category. That year he also played the lead in Henry Hathaway's North to Alaska, co-starring Stewart Granger and Ernie Kovacs. In 1961, Wayne shared the lead with Stuart Whitman in Michael Curtiz's The Comancheros.

In 1962, Wayne starred in John Ford's The Man Who Shot Liberty Valance with James Stewart. On May 29, Howard Hawks' Hatari! premiered, shot on location in Africa, with Wayne playing the lead capturing wild animals from the beds of trucks; all the animal scenes in the film are real. On October 4, The Longest Day began its theatrical run, with Wayne appearing in an ensemble cast. Although the other top‑level actors accepted token payments of $10,000 each to make the all‑star cast feasible, Wayne was paid $250,000 because of an earlier dispute with producer Darryl F. Zanuck. During this period, the cast of the television drama Combat! were preparing for their inaugural season with a week of basic training at the Army's Infantry Training Center at Fort Ord in northern California. Vic Morrow noted that instructors had one common request: not to act like John Wayne. "Poor John," Morrow said. "I wonder if he knows he's almost a dirty word in the Army."

In 1963, Wayne appeared in a segment of How the West Was Won, directed by Ford. On June 12, he played the lead in his final Ford film, Donovan's Reef, co-starring Lee Marvin. On November 13, Andrew V. McLaglen's McLintock! premiered, with Wayne again opposite Maureen O'Hara.

In 1964, Wayne played the leading role in Hathaway's Circus World with Claudia Cardinale and Rita Hayworth.

In 1965, Wayne appeared in a brief cameo as a centurion in George Stevens's The Greatest Story Ever Told. On April 6, he shared the screen with Kirk Douglas and Patricia Neal in Otto Preminger's In Harm's Way. On June 13, he acted in Hathaway's The Sons of Katie Elder with Dean Martin.

In 1966, Wayne appeared in a cameo for Melville Shavelson's Cast a Giant Shadow, starring Douglas.

In 1967, Wayne played the lead in Burt Kennedy's The War Wagon, with Douglas as the second lead. His second film that year, Hawks' El Dorado, a successful partial remake of Rio Bravo with Robert Mitchum in Dean Martin's original role, premiered on June 7.

In 1968, Wayne co-directed The Green Berets with Ray Kellogg, the only major film made during the Vietnam War in support of the war. Wayne wanted to make the film because Hollywood had little interest in Vietnam War subjects at the time. During filming, the Degar (Montagnard) people of Vietnam's Central Highlands, fierce fighters against communism, gave Wayne a brass bracelet that he wore in the film and in all subsequent films. Also in 1968, Wayne played the lead in McLaglen's Hellfighters, a film about crews who extinguish oil‑rig fires. Katharine Ross played a supporting role.

On June 13, 1969, Hathaway's True Grit premiered. For his role as Rooster Cogburn, Wayne won the Best Actor Oscar at the 42nd Academy Awards. In November, McLaglen's The Undefeated, co starring Rock Hudson, was released.

=== 1970s: later career ===
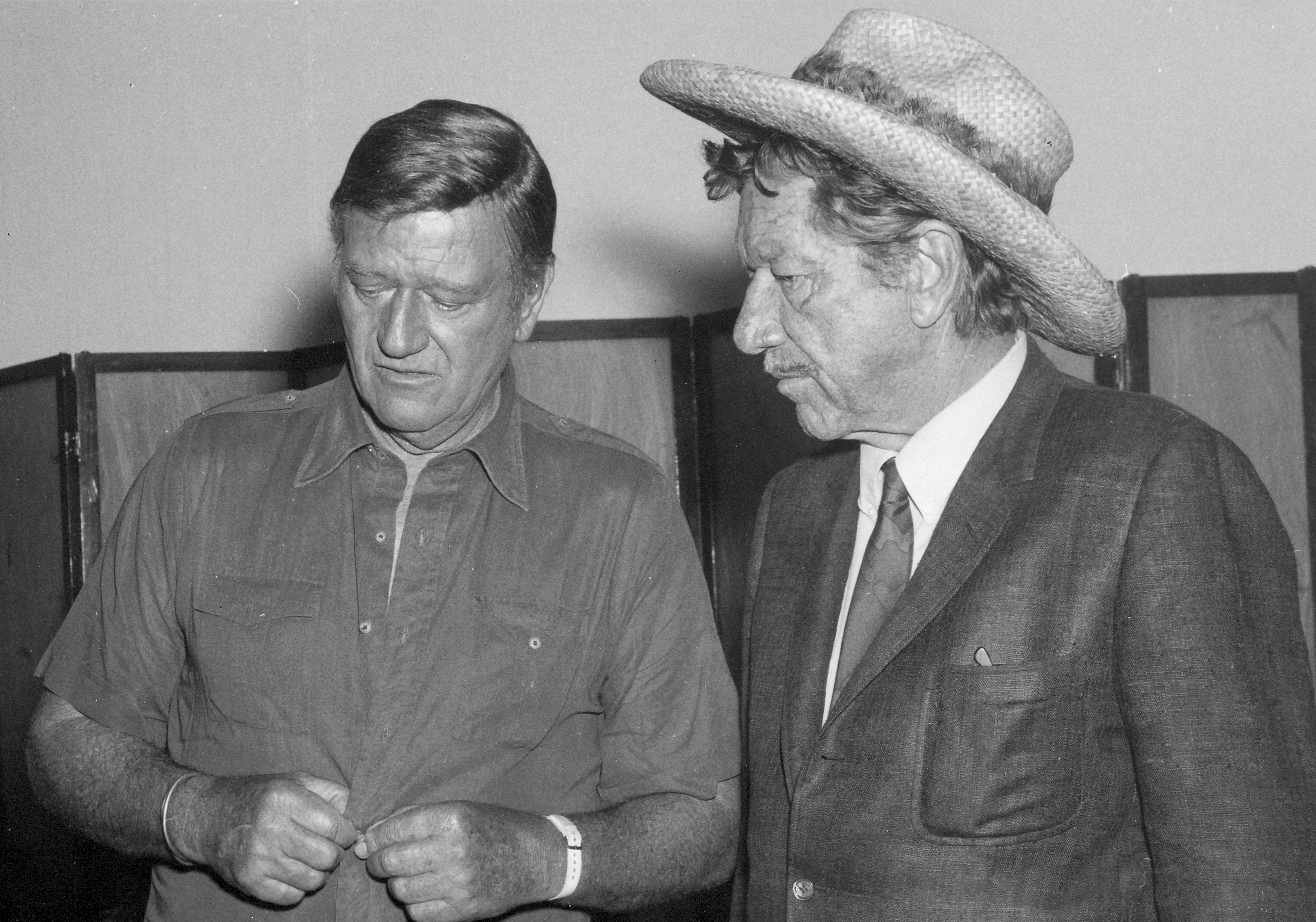
Wayne and Richard Boone at Big Jake screening, 1971

On June 24, 1970, McLaglen's Chisum opended. Wayne played a cattle‑ranch owner who discovers that a businessman is trying to seize neighboring land illegally. On September 16, Hawks's Rio Lobo premiered. Wayne played Col. Cord McNally, who confronts Confederate soldiers who stole a shipment of gold at the end of the Civil War. It was another remake of Rio Bravo, though without a second lead of box-office stature of Dean Martin or Robert Mitchum.

In June 1971, George Sherman's Big Jake debuted. Wayne played an estranged father who must track down a gang that kidnapped his grandson. The film was a critically acclaimed hit.

In 1972, Wayne starred in Mark Rydell's The Cowboys. Vincent Canby of The New York Times, who did not particularly care for the film, wrote: "Wayne is, of course, marvelously indestructible, and he has become an almost perfect father figure". That year, he was selected in the last round of the NFL draft by the Atlanta Falcons for his past football experience, though the pick was disallowed because he was 64 years old.

On February 7, 1973, Burt Kennedy's The Train Robbers opened, with Wayne appearing alongside Ann-Margret, Rod Taylor, and Ben Johnson. On June 27, McLaglen's Cahill U.S. Marshal premiered, with Wayne, George Kennedy, and Gary Grimes. It was a box-office failure.

In 1974, Wayne played the lead role in John Sturges's crime drama McQ.

On March 25, 1975, Douglas Hickox's Brannigan premiered. In it, Wayne played Chicago police lieutenant Jim Brannigan, on the hunt in London for an organized-crime leader. On October 17, Rooster Cogburn began its theatrical run; Wayne reprised his role as U.S. Marshal Reuben J. "Rooster" Cogburn with strong plot elements reminiscent of The African Queen, and Katharine Hepburn as his leading lady.

In 1976, Wayne starred in Don Siegel's The Shootist, co-starring Lauren Bacall, Ron Howard, and James Stewart. It was Wayne's final film role. Its main character, J. B. Books, is dying of cancer, the disease to which Wayne himself succumbed three years later. The film contains numerous plot similarities to The Gunfighter, of nearly 30 years before, a role Wayne had wanted decades earlier but turned down. Upon release, it grossed $13,406,138 domestically, with about $6 million earned as US theatrical rentals. The film received positive reviews. It was named one of the Ten Best Films of 1976 by the National Board of Review. Roger Ebert ranked The Shootist number 10 on his list of the year's best films. It was nominated for an Oscar, a Golden Globe, a BAFTA film award, and a Writers Guild of America award.

== Personal life ==
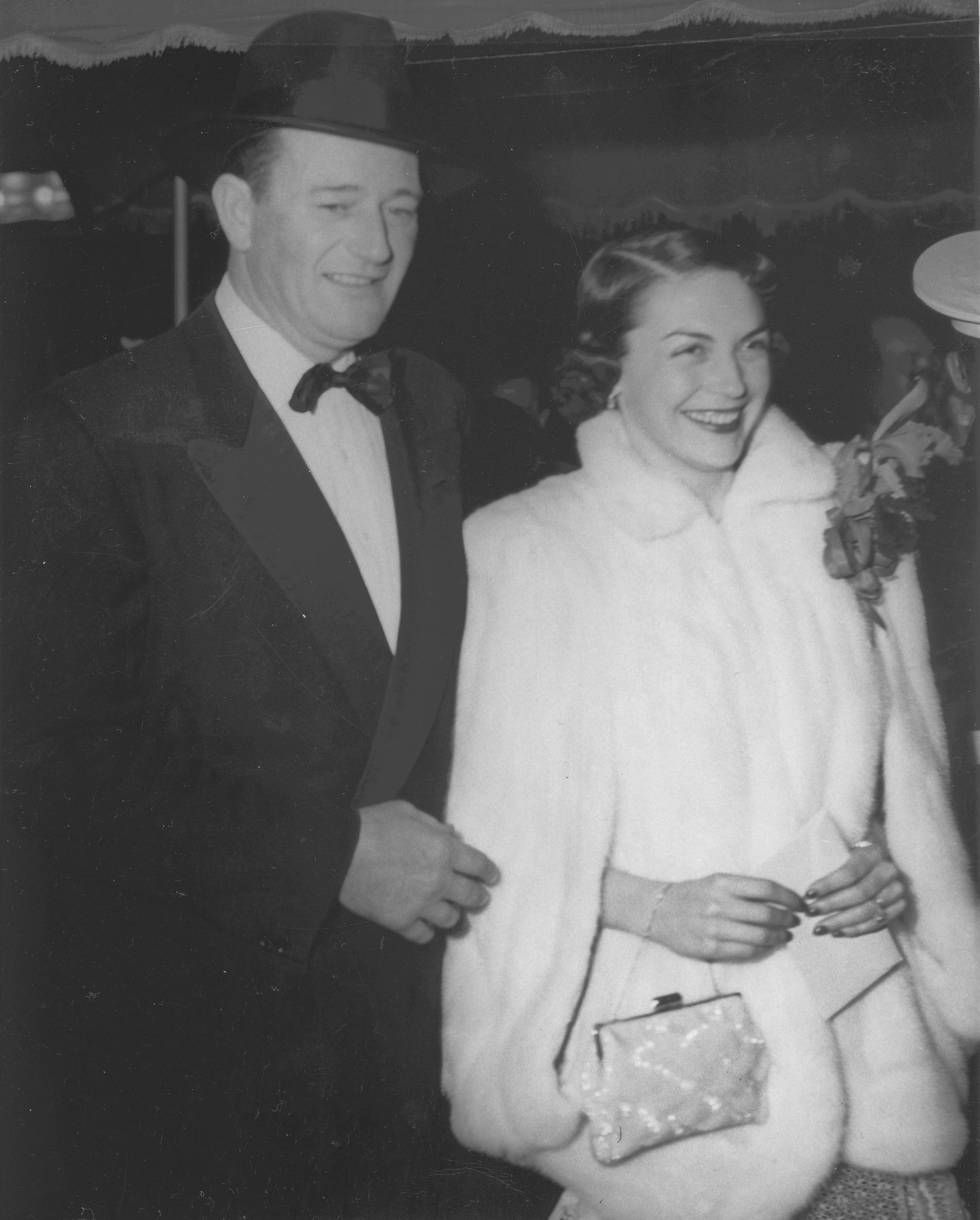
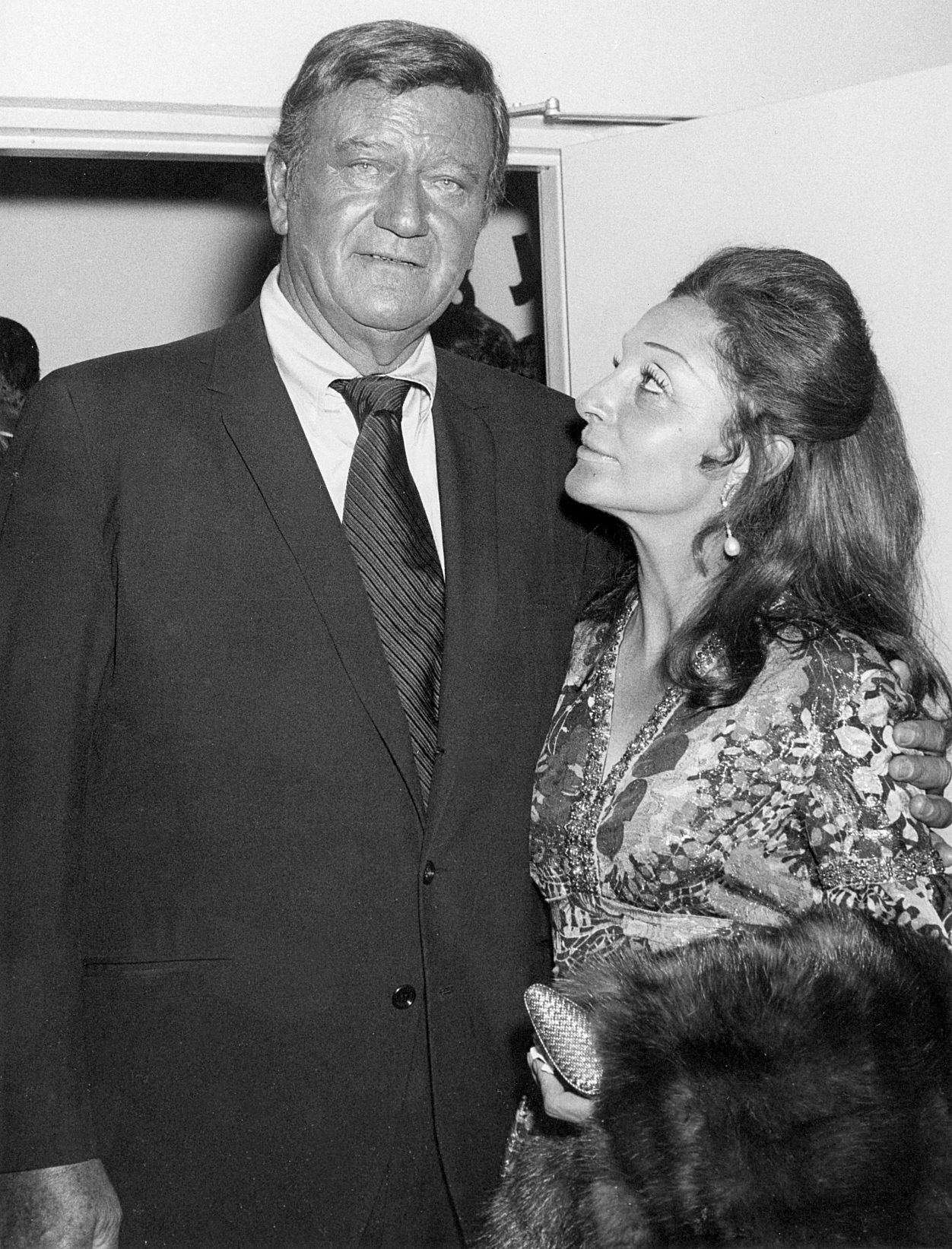
Wayne with his second wife Esperanza Baur, 1949 (left); Wayne with his third wife Pilar Pallete, 1971 (right)

Wayne was married three times and divorced twice. His wives included Josephine Alicia Saenz, of Spanish American descent, and two women from Latin America, Esperanza Baur and Pilar Pallete. He had four children with Josephine: Michael Wayne (1934–2003), Mary Antonia "Toni" Wayne LaCava (1936–2000), Patrick Wayne (born 1939), and Melinda Wayne Munoz (1940–2022). He had three more children with Pilar: Aissa Wayne (born 1956), John Ethan Wayne (born 1962), and Marisa Wayne (born 1966).

Several of Wayne's children entered the film and television industry. Ethan, billed as John Ethan Wayne in a few films, played one of the leads in the 1990s update of the Adam-12 television series. He has also appeared on the History Channel show Pawn Stars to help authenticate merchandise related to his father's career. Granddaughter Jennifer Wayne, daughter of Aissa, is a member of the country music group Runaway June.

In 1973, Wayne was encouraged by Pilar, an avid tennis player, to build the John Wayne Tennis Club in Newport Beach, California. In 1995, the club was sold to former general manager Ken Stuart and became the Palisades Tennis Club. In The Quiet Man (1952), Wayne tells Michaeleen "Óg", (Irish: Young), Flynn, played by Barry Fitzgerald, that he is six feet "four and a half" (194 cm), a claim corroborated by Pilar's book John Wayne: My Life With the Duke.

His divorce from Baur, a Mexican former actress, was stormy. She believed that Wayne and co-star Gail Russell were having an affair, a claim both denied. On the night Angel and the Badman (1947) wrapped, a party was held for cast and crew, and Wayne came home very late. Esperanza, in a drunken rage, attempted to shoot him as he walked through the front door.

Wayne had several high-profile affairs, including one with Merle Oberon that lasted from 1938 to 1947. After his separation from Pilar in 1973, Wayne became romantically involved with his former secretary Pat Stacy (1941–1995), with whom he lived until his death in 1979. Stacy published a book about their life together in 1983, titled Duke: A Love Story.

Wayne's hair began to thin in the 1940s, and he began wearing a hairpiece by the end of the decade. He was occasionally seen in public without it, including, according to Life, at Gary Cooper's funeral. During an appearance at Harvard University, a student asked, "Is it true that your toupée is real mohair?" Wayne replied: "Sir, that's real hair. Not mine, but real hair."

California Congressman Alphonzo Alphonzo E. Bell Jr., a close friend, wrote of Wayne: "Duke's personality and sense of humor were very close to what the general public saw on the big screen. It is perhaps best shown in these words he had engraved on a plaque: 'Each of us is a mixture of some good and some not so good qualities. In considering one's fellow man, it's important to remember the good things. [...] We should refrain from making judgments just because a fella happens to be a dirty, rotten S.O.B.'"

Wayne was fond of literature. His favorite authors included Charles Dickens, Arthur Conan Doyle, and Agatha Christie. His favorite books were David Copperfield and Conan Doyle's historical novels The White Company and Sir Nigel.

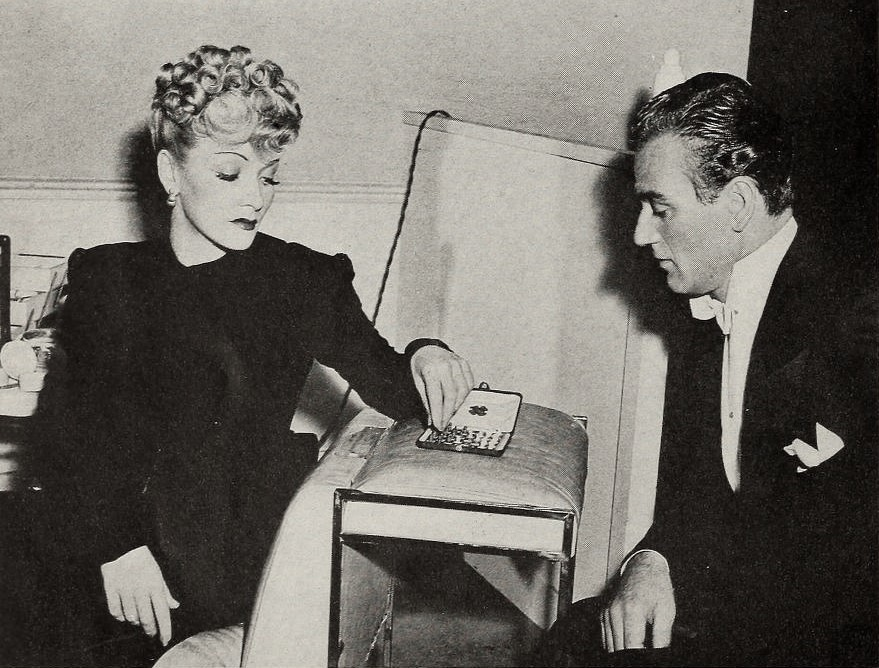
Wayne playing chess with Marlene Dietrich, 1943

Wayne was a chess player. Roger Ebert recalled that on the set of Chisum, "we were playing a chess game, both of us bending over the board on an upended apple crate. Wayne, slouched in his old stitched leather director's chair, had a crowd of kibitzers: wranglers, extras, old cronies, drinking buddies, a couple of Mexican stuntmen. He studied the board, roared with laughter, and said, 'God...damn it! You've trapped my queen!' We studied the board. I made a decisive move. 'Why the hell did I just say that?' he asked. If I hadn't-a...said it, you wouldn't-a...seen it.'" According to Michael Munn, when Wayne was asked about Rock Hudson's sexuality, he replied, "Who the hell cares if he's a queer? The man plays great chess."

He used the same 1873 Colt Single Action Army revolver in many of his Westerns.

Wayne had been a chain smoker since young adulthood and was diagnosed with lung cancer in 1964. He underwent surgery to remove his entire left lung and two ribs. Despite efforts by business associates to keep his illness private for fear it would cost him work, Wayne announced he had cancer and urged the public to get preventive examinations. Five years later, he was declared cancer‑free. He has been credited with coining the term "the Big C" as a euphemism for cancer. Wayne biographer Michael Munn chronicled his drinking habits. According to Sam O'Steen's memoir Cut to the Chase, studio directors knew to shoot Wayne's scenes before noon because by afternoon he "was a mean drunk". Ebert quoted him as saying: "Tequila makes your head hurt. Not from your hangover. From falling over and hitting your head."

Wayne was an active Freemason. He was made a Master Mason at Marion McDaniel Lodge No. 56 F&AM in Tucson, Arizona. He became a 32nd Degree Scottish Rite Mason and later joined the Al Malaikah Shrine Temple in Los Angeles, along with fellow actor Roy Rogers. He later became a member of the York Rite. During his childhood, he was a member of a local Demolay chapter in Glendale.

During the early 1960s, Wayne traveled frequently to Panama and purchased the island of Taborcillo off the nation's Pacific coast. It was sold by his estate after his death.

Wayne's yacht, the Wild Goose, was one of his favorite possessions. He kept it docked in Newport Beach Harbor, and it was listed on the U.S. National Register of Historic Places in 2011.

== Political and social views ==
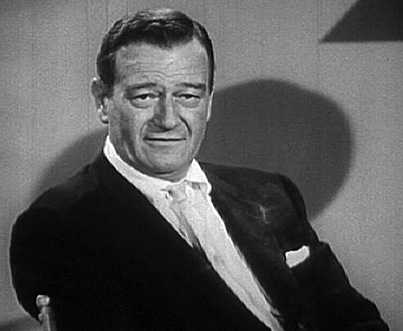
Wayne in The Challenge of Ideas (1961)

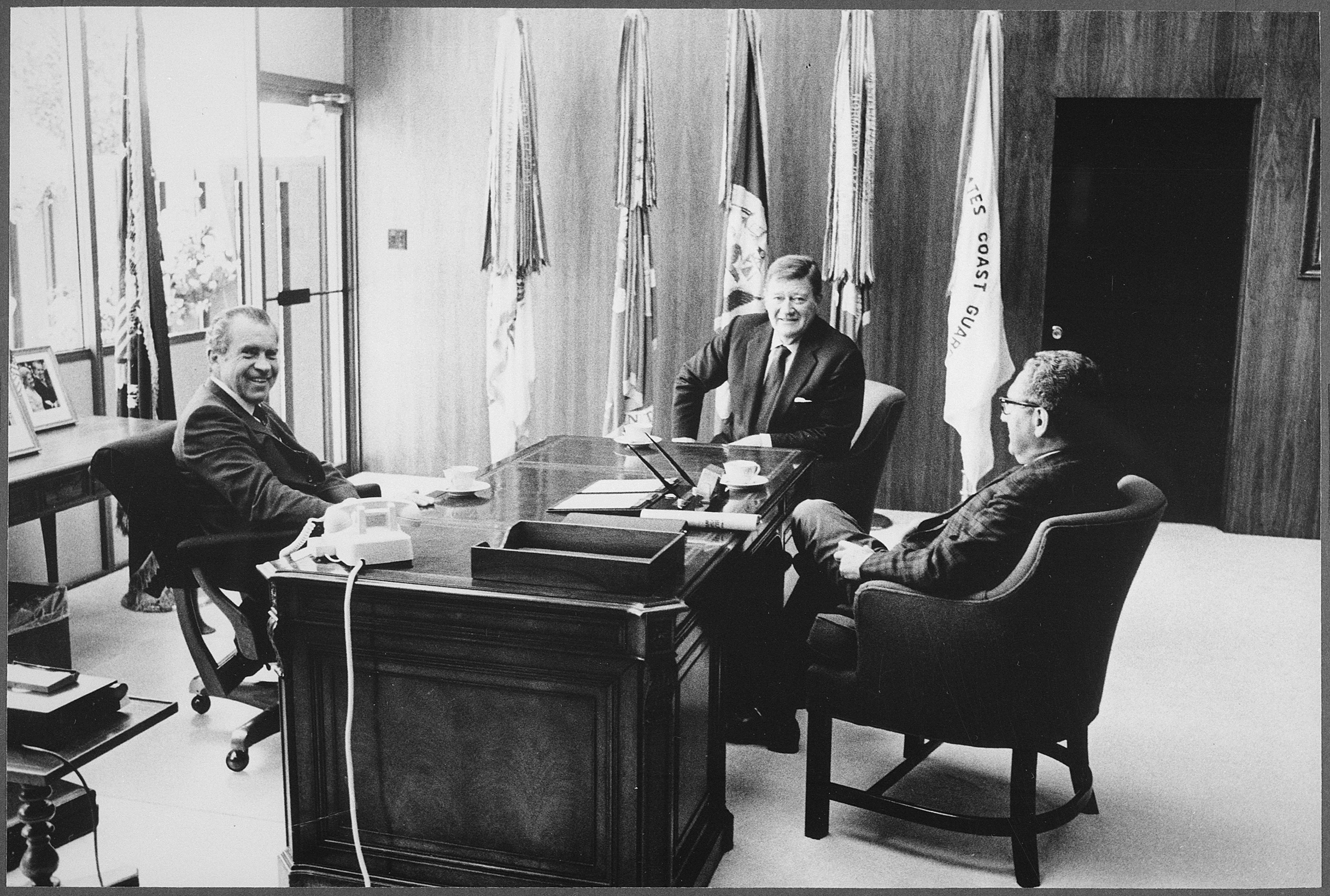
Wayne meeting with President Richard Nixon and Henry Kissinger in San Clemente, California, July 1972

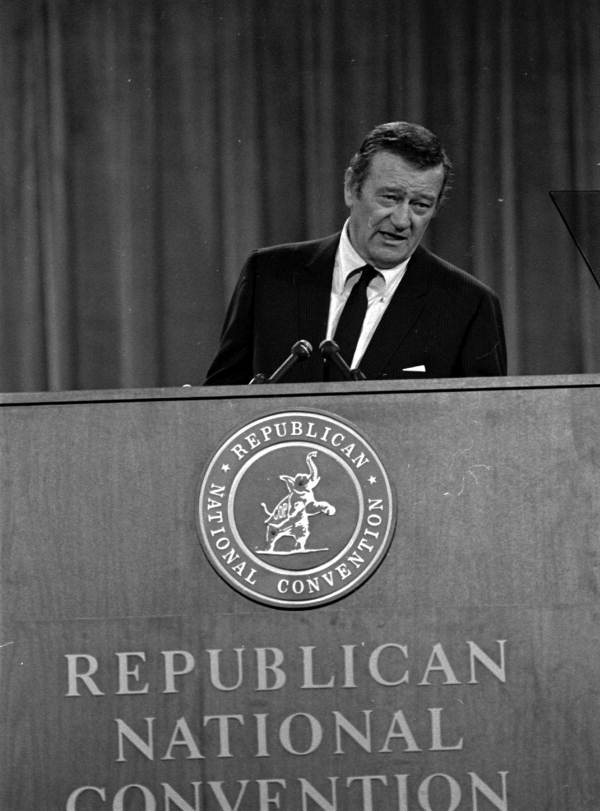
Wayne addressing the Republican Convention in Miami, 1968

Throughout most of his life, Wayne was a vocally prominent conservative Republican in Hollywood, supporting anti-communist positions. However, he voted for Democratic President Franklin D. Roosevelt in the 1936 presidential election and expressed admiration for Roosevelt's successor, fellow Democratic President Harry S. Truman, despite having supported Republican candidate Thomas E. Dewey in 1948. He took part in creating the conservative Motion Picture Alliance for the Preservation of American Ideals in February 1944 before being elected its president in 1949. An ardent anti-communist and vocal supporter of the House Un-American Activities Committee (HUAC), he made Big Jim McLain (1952) with himself as a HUAC investigator to demonstrate his support for the cause of anti-communism. His personal views found expression as a proactive inside enforcer of the "Black List", denying employment and undermining careers of many actors and writers who had expressed their personal political beliefs earlier in life. Soviet leader Joseph Stalin is alleged to have said that Wayne should be assassinated for his frequently espoused anti-communist politics, despite being a fan of his movies. Wayne was a supporter of Senator Joseph McCarthy.

Wayne supported Vice President Richard Nixon in the presidential election of 1960, but expressed his vision of patriotism when John F. Kennedy won the election: "I didn't vote for him, but he's my president, and I hope he does a good job." He used his star power to support conservative causes, including rallying support for the Vietnam War by producing, co-directing, and starring in the financially successful film The Green Berets (1968). In 1960, he joined the anti-communist John Birch Society, but quit after the organization denounced fluoridation of water supplies as a communist plot. In 1964, Wayne was a staunch supporter of Barry Goldwater, and actively campaigned for him.

Due to his status as the highest-profile Republican star in Hollywood, wealthy Texas Republican Party backers asked Wayne to run for national office in 1968, like his friend and fellow actor Senator George Murphy. He declined, joking that he did not believe the public would seriously consider an actor in the White House. Instead, he supported his friend Ronald Reagan's campaigns for Governor of California in 1966 and 1970. He was asked to be the running mate for Democratic Alabama Governor George Wallace, who had been nominated for president by the American Independent Party, in his 1968 campaign, but he immediately rejected the offer and actively campaigned for Nixon; Wayne addressed the 1968 Republican National Convention on its opening day.

In 1971, Wayne wrote to President Nixon, who was a friend, to oppose Nixon's planned trip to China. Wayne enclosed some hate literature on "that Jew, Kissinger", who had negotiated the historic meeting with Chinese leaders.

Wayne openly differed with many conservatives over the issue of returning the Panama Canal, as he supported the Panama Canal Treaty in the mid-1970s; while Republican leaders such as Reagan, Jesse Helms, and Strom Thurmond had wanted the U.S. to retain full control of the canal, Wayne and fellow conservative William F. Buckley believed that the Panamanians had the right to the canal and sided with President Jimmy Carter. Wayne was a close friend of Panamanian leader Omar Torrijos Herrera, and Wayne's first wife Josephine was a native of Panama. His support of the treaty brought him hate mail for the first time in his life.

In 1973, actor Marlon Brando refused an Oscar he had won, due to "the treatment of American Indians today by the film industry"; Brando did not attend the award ceremony but asked Native American civil rights activist Sacheen Littlefeather to attend and deliver a refusal speech in the event that he won. Wayne was allegedly waiting in the wings and was so angry about her presence there that Littlefeather said "he was coming towards me to forcibly take me off the stage, and he had to be restrained by six security men to prevent him from doing so." However, an investigation in 2022 found that this is unlikely to have happened, that Littlefeather had no way of witnessing this take place, that the supposed situation was never attested in contemporary reporting of the Oscars, and that the story grew as an urban legend through years of repeated exaggeration without sources.

In 1974, his personal conservative views were notably brought to light to a television audience on the Maude episode "Maude Meets the Duke," on which Wayne also guest starred.

Roger Ebert wrote that Wayne had a sense of humor about his politics. He recalls Wayne giving him a tour of his house: "He pointed out autographed photos of Eisenhower, Nixon, Goldwater, and J. Edgar Hoover. I said I had to take a pee. On the wall of the bathroom opening off the den, he had a photo of Hubert Humphrey, inscribed 'with warm appreciation for your continued Support.'" Colorado Congresswoman Pat Schroeder recalled that "John Wayne gave me a silver cigarette lighter during the Vietnam War that said 'Fuck Communism' on it. I didn't know how to do that. I still don't."

Left-wing activist Abbie Hoffman paid tribute to Wayne's singularity, saying, "I like Wayne's wholeness, his style. As for his politics, well—I suppose even cavemen felt a little admiration for the dinosaurs that were trying to gobble them up." Maoist avant garde film maker and critic Jean Luc Godard, in his Cahiers du Cinéma text "3000 heures de cinéma" ("3000 hours of cinema"), asked rhetorically:

How can I hate John Wayne upholding Goldwater and yet love him when abruptly he takes Natalie Wood in his arms in the last reel of The Searchers?

In a video clip which aired posthumously on People for the American Way's 1982 I Love Liberty TV special, Wayne stated that while he disagreed with Jane Fonda, he still believed she had the right to say what she believed.

=== 1971 Playboy interview ===
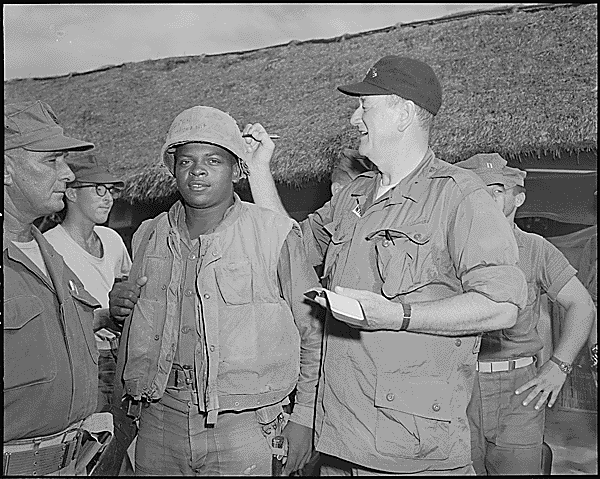
Wayne signing the helmet of Pfc. Fonzell Wofford during a visit at Chu Lai, South Vietnam, in June 1966

In May 1971, Playboy magazine published an interview with Wayne, in which he expressed his support for the Vietnam War, and made headlines for his opinions about social issues and race relations in the United States:

With a lot of blacks, there's quite a bit of resentment along with their dissent, and possibly rightfully so. But we can't all of a sudden get down on our knees and turn everything over to the leadership of the blacks. I believe in white supremacy until the blacks are educated to a point of responsibility. ... I don't feel we did wrong in taking this great country away from the Indians. Our so-called stealing of this country from them was just a matter of survival. There were great numbers of people who needed new land, and the Indians were selfishly trying to keep it for themselves.

In the same Playboy interview, he also responded to questions about whether social programs were good for the country:

I know all about that. In the late '20s, when I was a sophomore at USC, I was a socialist myself—but not when I left. The average college kid idealistically wishes everybody could have ice cream and cake for every meal, but as he gets older and gives more thought to his and his fellow man's responsibilities, he finds that it can't work out that way—that some people just won't carry their load ... I believe in welfare—a welfare work program. I don't think a fella should be able to sit on his backside and receive welfare. I'd like to know why well-educated idiots keep apologizing for lazy and complaining people who think the world owes them a living. I'd like to know why they make excuses for cowards who spit in the faces of the police and then run behind the judicial sob sisters. I can't understand these people who carry placards to save the life of some criminal, yet have no thought for the innocent victim.

In February 2019, the Playboy interview resurfaced, which resulted in calls for John Wayne Airport to be renamed. Wayne's son, Ethan, defended him, stating: "It would be an injustice to judge someone based on an interview that's being used out of context." The calls for changing the airport's name back to Orange County Airport were renewed during the George Floyd protests in June 2020, though the name, as of 2026, remains unchanged.

In October 2019, student activists of Wayne's alma mater the University of Southern California called for removing from the university's premises an exhibit dedicated to Wayne, citing the interview as cause. In July 2020, it was announced that the materials of the 2012-created exhibit would be moved to the USC Cinematic Arts Library for "research," to "allow scholarship to continue on the role John Wayne's films played in the history of cinema."

== Death ==
Although he enrolled in a cancer-vaccine study in an effort to ward off the disease, Wayne died of stomach cancer at the UCLA Medical Center in Los Angeles, on June 11, 1979, at age 72. He was buried at Pacific View Memorial Park in Corona del Mar, Newport Beach. According to his son Patrick and his grandson Matthew Muñoz, a priest in the Roman Catholic Diocese of Orange, Wayne converted to Roman Catholicism shortly before his death. He requested that his tombstone read "Feo, Fuerte y Formal ", which he described as meaning "ugly, strong, and dignified". His grave remained unmarked for 20 years, but since 1999 it has carried the following inscription:

Tomorrow is the most important thing in life. Comes into us at midnight very clean. It's perfect when it arrives and it puts itself in our hands. It hopes we've learned something from yesterday.

== Legacy ==
=== Acting evaluation ===
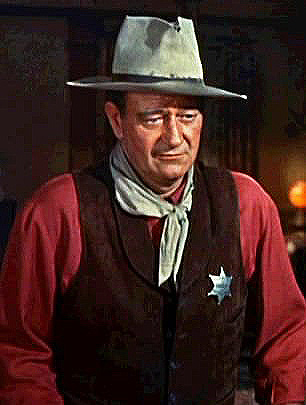
Wayne in Rio Bravo (1959)

In 1974, film critic Charles Champlin wrote of Wayne: "Wayne is a motion picture actor, first, last and always, who defined as powerfully as anyone else what that means. From the lean and intense early days, in those low-cost dusters which still play on morning television, Wayne has had a presence which got through the lenses and shutters and onto the film undiminished." John Ford said of him: "He's not something out of a book, governed by acting rules. He portrays John Wayne, a rugged American guy. He's not one of those method actors, like they send out here from drama schools in New York. He's real, perfectly natural." Lee Strasberg observed that Wayne was similar to fellow actors Spencer Tracy and Gary Cooper, who "try not to act but be themselves".

Film historian Andrew Sarris wrote in 1979,

Wayne's most enduring image is that of the displaced loner uncomfortable with the very civilization he is helping to establish and preserve ... At his first appearance, we usually sense a very private person with some wound, loss or grievance from the past. At his very best he is much closer to a tragic vision of life ... projecting the kind of mystery associated with great acting.

Wayne thought of himself as a reactor rather than an actor, and felt that the difference between good and bad acting was in acting and reacting. He explained this difference: "In a bad picture, you see them acting all over the place. In a good picture, they react in a logical way to a situation they're in, so the audience can identify with the actors." When asked about his approach to acting, Wayne commented: "I read dramatic lines undramatically and react to situations normally. This is not as simple as it sounds. I've spent a major portion of my life trying to do it well and I am not past learning it yet." Much like many actors of his generation, Wayne disliked method acting, and once said of them: "Let those actors who picked their noses get all the dialogue, just give me the close-up of reaction."

Howard Hawks, who directed him in five films, felt that after losing one of his lungs, Wayne became a much better actor. Hawks explained: "Because of the lung Wayne lost, he reads his lines differently. He pauses in the strangest places simply because he hasn't got the breath he used to have. This device is terribly effective, because you keep your eyes on him and wait for him to finish, because you don't know what's coming next." Raoul Walsh noted: "Wayne underacts, and it's mighty effective, not because he tries to underact—it's a hard thing to do if you try—but because he can't overact."

Despite his popularity at the box office, Wayne was often criticized for playing the same type of character during most of his career. In a 1969 interview with Roger Ebert, Wayne remarked: "Of course, they give me that John Wayne stuff so much, claim I always play the same role. Seems like nobody remembers how different the fellows were in The Quiet Man or Iwo Jima, or Yellow Ribbon, where I was 35 playing a man of 65. To stay a star, you have to bring along some of your own personality. Thousands of good actors can carry a scene, but a star has to carry the scene and still, without intruding, allow some of his character into it."

Gene Hackman said that Wayne "was one of the best actors ever. You must admire how really good he was as an actor, in command of the scene and with such great charisma."

=== Awards, celebrations, and landmarks ===
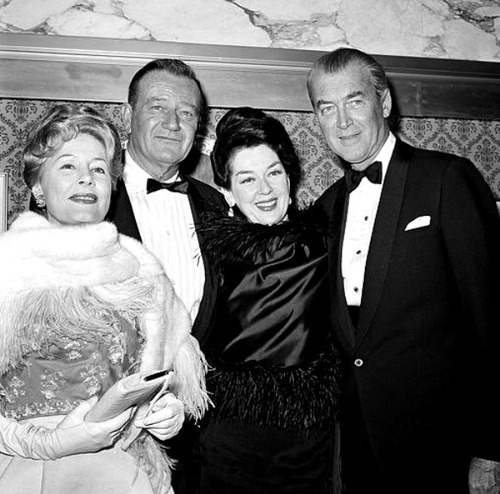
Irene Dunne, Wayne, Rosalind Russell and James Stewart at the premiere of How the West Was Won, 1962

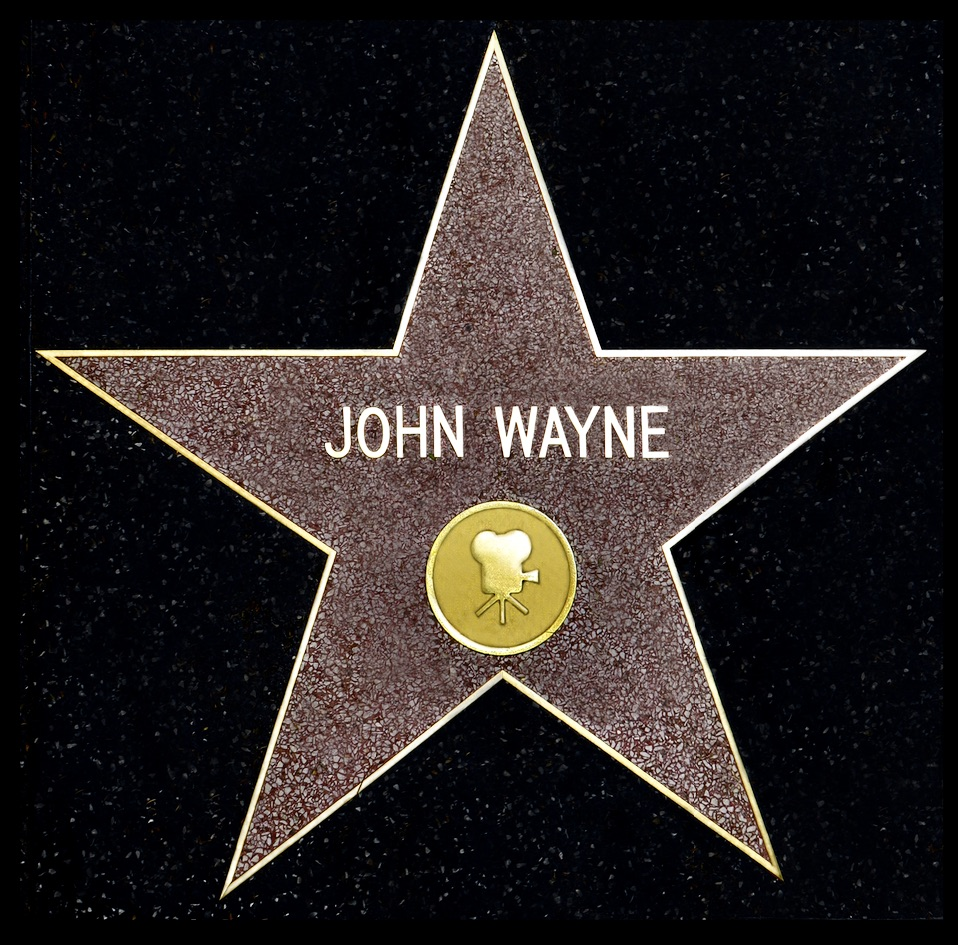
John Wayne star on the Hollywood Walk Of Fame photo by Steve Shelokhonov, 2026

Wayne's enduring status as an iconic American was formally recognized by the U.S. government in the form of the two highest civilian decorations. On his 72nd birthday on May 26, 1979, Wayne was awarded the Congressional Gold Medal. Hollywood figures and American leaders from across the political spectrum, including Maureen O'Hara, Elizabeth Taylor, Frank Sinatra, Mike Frankovich, Katharine Hepburn, Omar Bradley, Gregory Peck, Robert Stack, James Arness, and Kirk Douglas, testified to Congress in support of the award. Robert Aldrich, president of the Directors Guild of America, made a particularly notable statement:

It is important for you to know that I am a registered Democrat, and to my knowledge, share none of the political views espoused by Duke. However, whether he is ill disposed or healthy, John Wayne is far beyond the normal political sharpshooting in this community. Because of his courage, his dignity, his integrity, and because of his talents as an actor, his strength as a leader, his warmth as a human being throughout his illustrious career, he is entitled to a unique spot in our hearts and minds. In this industry, we often judge people, sometimes unfairly, by asking whether they have paid their dues. John Wayne has paid his dues over and over, and I'm proud to consider him a friend and am very much in favor of my government recognizing in some important fashion the contribution that Mr. Wayne has made.

Wayne was posthumously awarded the Presidential Medal of Freedom on June 9, 1980, by President Jimmy Carter. He had attended Carter's inaugural ball in 1977 "as a member of the loyal opposition", as he described it. In 1998, he was awarded the Naval Heritage Award by the US Navy Memorial Foundation for his support of the Navy and military during his film career. In 1999, the American Film Institute named Wayne 13th among the Greatest Male Screen Legends of classic Hollywood cinema.

In the essay "John Wayne: A Love Song", Joan Didion recalls the first time she saw Wayne in a movie: "it was there, that summer of 1943 while the hot wind blew outside, that I first saw John Wayne. Saw the walk, heard the voice. Heard him tell the girl in a picture called War of the Wildcats that he would build her a house, 'at the bend in the river where the cottonwoods grow.' As it happened I did not grow up to be kind of woman who is the heroine in a Western, and although the men I have known have had many virtues and have taken me to live in many places I have come to love, they have never been John Wayne, and they have never taken me to that bend in the river where the cottonwoods grow. Deep in that part of my heart where the artificial rain forever falls, that is still the line I want to hear ... When John Wayne rode through my childhood, and perhaps through yours, he determined forever the shapes of certain of our dreams. It did not seem possible that such a man could fall ill, could carry within him that most inexplicable and ungovernable of diseases."

Various public locations are named in honor of Wayne, including the John Wayne Airport in Orange County, California, where a 9-foot (2.7 m) bronze equestrian statue of him stands at the entrance; the John Wayne Marina for which Wayne bequeathed the land, near Sequim, Washington; John Wayne Elementary School (P.S. 380) in Brooklyn, New York, which boasts a 38-foot (12 m) mosaic mural commission by New York artist Knox Martin entitled "John Wayne and the American Frontier"; and over 100 miles (160 km) named the "John Wayne Pioneer Trail" in Washington's Iron Horse State Park. A larger-than-life-sized bronze statue of Wayne atop a horse was erected at the corner of La Cienega Boulevard and Wilshire Boulevard in Beverly Hills, California, at the former offices of the Great Western Savings and Loan Corporation, for which Wayne had made a number of commercials. In the city of Maricopa, Arizona, part of Arizona State Route 347 is named John Wayne Parkway, which runs through the center of town.

In 2006, friends of Wayne and his former Arizona business partner, Louis Johnson, inaugurated the "Louie and the Duke Classics" events benefiting the John Wayne Cancer Foundation and the American Cancer Society. The weekend-long event each fall in Casa Grande, Arizona, includes a golf tournament, an auction of John Wayne memorabilia, and a team roping competition.

Several celebrations took place on May 26, 2007, the centennial of Wayne's birth. A celebration at the John Wayne birthplace in Winterset, Iowa, included chuck-wagon suppers, concerts by Michael Martin Murphey and Riders in the Sky, a Wild West Revue in the style of Buffalo Bill's Wild West show, and a Cowboy Symposium with Wayne's costars, producers, and costumers. Wayne's films ran continuously at the local theater. Ground was broken for the new John Wayne Birthplace Museum and Learning Center at a ceremony consisting of over 30 of Wayne's family members, including Melinda Wayne Muñoz, Aissa, Ethan, and Marisa Wayne. Later that year, California Governor Arnold Schwarzenegger and First Lady Maria Shriver inducted Wayne into the California Hall of Fame, located at the California Museum in Sacramento.

In 2016, Republican assemblyman Matthew Harper proposed marking May 26 as "John Wayne Day" in California. This resolution was struck down by a vote of 35 to 20, due to Wayne's views on race and his support of controversial organizations such as the John Birch Society and the House Un-American Activities Committee.

=== American icon ===
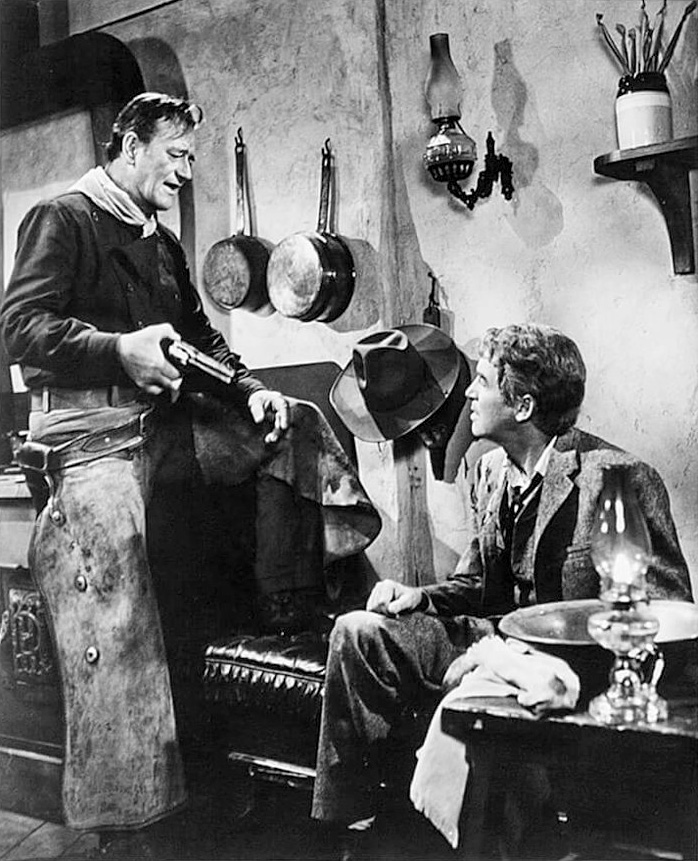
Wayne and James Stewart in The Man Who Shot Liberty Valance (1962)

Wayne rose beyond the typical recognition for a famous actor to that of an enduring icon who symbolized and communicated American values and ideals. Using the power of communication through silent films and radio, Wayne was instrumental in creating a national culture from disparate areas of the US, and made the creation of a national hero possible. By the middle of his career, Wayne had developed a larger-than-life image, and as his career progressed, he selected roles that would not compromise his off-screen image. Wayne embodied the image of strong American masculinity and rugged individualism in both his films and his life. At a party in 1957, Wayne confronted actor Kirk Douglas about the latter's decision to play the role of Vincent van Gogh in the film Lust for Life, saying: "Christ, Kirk, how can you play a part like that? There's so goddamn few of us left. We got to play strong, tough characters. Not these weak queers." However, actor Marlon Brando was notably critical of Wayne's public persona and of the cultural insensitivity of Wayne's characters, arguing on The Dick Cavett Show that, "We [Americans] like to see ourselves as perhaps John Wayne sees us. That we are a country that stands for freedom, for rightness, for justice," before adding that "it just simply doesn't apply."

Wayne's rise to being the quintessential movie war hero began to take shape four years after World War II, when Sands of Iwo Jima (1949) was released. His footprints at Grauman's Chinese theater in Hollywood were laid in concrete that contained sand from Iwo Jima. His status grew so large and legendary that when Japanese emperor Hirohito visited the United States in 1975, he asked to meet John Wayne, the symbolic representation of his country's former enemy. Likewise when Soviet leader Nikita Khrushchev visited the United States in 1959, he made two requests: to visit Disneyland and meet Wayne.

In the Motion Picture Herald Top Ten Money-Making Western Stars poll, Wayne was listed in 1936 and 1939. He appeared in the similar Box Office poll in 1939 and 1940. While these two polls are really an indication only of the popularity of series stars, Wayne also appeared in the Top Ten Money Makers Poll of all films from 1949 to 1957 and 1958 to 1974, taking first place in 1950, 1951, 1954, and 1971. With a total of 25 years on the list, Wayne has more appearances than any other star, surpassing Clint Eastwood (21) who is in second place.

Wayne is the only actor to appear in every edition of the annual Harris Poll of Most Popular Film Actors, and the only actor to appear on the list after his death. Wayne was in the top 10 in this poll for 19 consecutive years, starting in 1994, 15 years after his death.

Mylène Demongeot declared in a 2015 filmed interview: "Gary Cooper was sublime, there I have to say, now he, was part of the stars, Gary Cooper, Cary Grant, John Wayne, those great Americans who I've met really were unbelievable guys, there aren't any like them anymore."

=== John Wayne Cancer Foundation ===
The John Wayne Cancer Foundation was founded in 1985 in honor of John Wayne, after his family granted the use of his name (and limited funding) for the continued fight against cancer. The foundation's mission is to "bring courage, strength, and grit to the fight against cancer". The foundation provides funds for innovative programs that improve cancer patient care, including research, education, awareness, and support.

=== Dispute with Duke University ===
Newport Beach, California-based John Wayne Enterprises, a business operated by Wayne's heirs, sells products, including Kentucky straight Bourbon, bearing the "Duke" brand and using Wayne's picture. When the company tried to trademark the image appearing on one of the bottles, Duke University in Durham, North Carolina, filed a notice of opposition. According to court documents, Duke has tried three times since 2005 to stop the company from trademarking the name. The company sought a declaration permitting registration of their trademark. The company's complaint filed in federal court said the university did "not own the word 'Duke' in all contexts for all purposes." The university's official position was not to object provided Wayne's image appeared with the name. On September 30, 2014, Orange County, California federal judge David Carter dismissed the company's suit, deciding the plaintiffs had chosen the wrong jurisdiction.

== Filmography ==
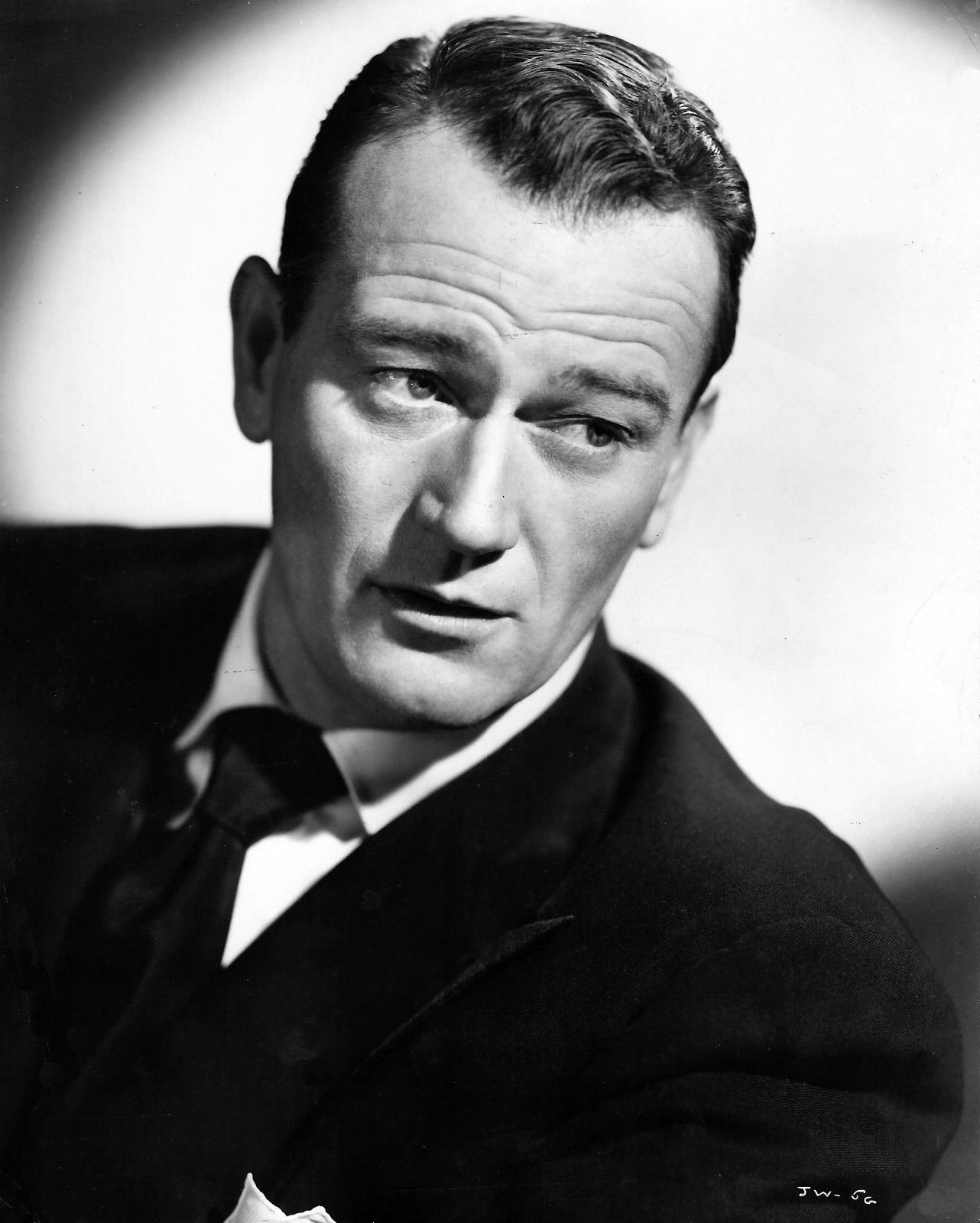
Portrait of Wayne, 1952

Between 1926 and 1977, Wayne appeared in over 170 films. According to Quigley Polling, Wayne was named the top money maker (as of 2005).

== Missed roles ==
- Wayne turned down the lead role in the 1952 film High Noon because he felt the film's story was an allegory against blacklisting, which he supported. In a 1971 interview, Wayne said he considered High Noon "the most un-American thing I've ever seen in my whole life", and that he would "never regret having helped run screenwriter Carl Foreman [who was later blacklisted] out of the country".
- An urban legend has it that in 1955, Wayne turned down the role of Matt Dillon in the long-running television series Gunsmoke and recommended James Arness, instead. While he did suggest Arness for the part and introduced him in a prologue to the first episode, no film star of Wayne's stature would have considered a television role at the time.
- Director-collaborator Howard Hawks planned to follow Hatari! (1962) with another star vehicle for Wayne, Hardy Krüger, Elsa Martinelli and Red Buttons, entitled Bengal Tiger. Like Hatari!, the project was an action drama "with comic overtones" and based on an original story by Leigh Brackett. Specifically, it would film in India and treat of conflict between wild and tame elephants, their capture and training.
- Hawks also expected to use Wayne, in addition to other such stars as Burt Lancaster and Dean Martin, to lead Yukon Trail, an original comic adventure by two first-time screenwriters about a cattle drive to Alaska during the Gold Rush, budgeted at roughly $11 million.
- Terry Southern's biographer Lee Hill wrote that the role of Major T. J. "King" Kong in Dr. Strangelove (1964) was originally written with Wayne in mind, and that Stanley Kubrick offered him the part after Peter Sellers supposedly injured his ankle during filming; he immediately turned it down. While Sellers went on to play three other roles in the film, Slim Pickens played Kong.
- In 1966, Wayne accepted the role of Major Reisman in The Dirty Dozen (1967), and asked Metro-Goldwyn-Mayer for some script changes, but eventually withdrew from the project to make The Green Berets. He was replaced by Lee Marvin.
- Though Wayne campaigned for the title role in Dirty Harry (1971), Warner Bros. decided that at 63 he was too old, and cast the 41-year-old Clint Eastwood.
- In the early '70s, several years before the film was made, Wayne was offered the lead role in Michael Cimino's Heaven's Gate (1980), then under the title The Johnson County War. Wayne would later present the Best Picture prize to Cimino at the 51st Academy Awards for The Deer Hunter (1978).
- Director Peter Bogdanovich and screenwriter Larry McMurtry pitched a film in 1972 called The Streets of Laredo that would co-star Wayne along with James Stewart and Henry Fonda. They conceived it as a Western that would bring the final curtain down on Hollywood Westerns. Stewart and Fonda both agreed to appear in it, but after long consideration, Wayne turned it down, citing his feeling that his character was more underdeveloped and uninteresting than those of his co-stars. The project was shelved for some 20 years, until McMurtry rewrote and expanded the original screenplay co-written with Bogdanovich to make the novel and subsequent TV miniseries Lonesome Dove, with Tommy Lee Jones in Wayne's role and Robert Duvall playing the part originally written for Stewart in the popular miniseries.
- Mel Brooks offered Wayne the role of the Waco Kid (eventually played by Gene Wilder) in Blazing Saddles (1974). After reading the script, Wayne declined, fearing the dialogue was "too dirty" for his family-friendly image, but told Brooks that he would be "first in line" to see the movie.
- Steven Spielberg offered Wayne and Charlton Heston the role of Major General Joseph Stilwell in the film 1941 with Wayne also considered for a cameo in it. After reading the script, Wayne decided not to participate due to ill health, but also urged Spielberg not to pursue the project. Wayne and Heston felt the film was unpatriotic. Spielberg recalled, "[Wayne] said, 'You know, that was an important war, and you're making fun of a war that cost thousands of lives at Pearl Harbor. Don't joke about World War II'."

== Awards and nominations ==
=== Academy Awards ===
Year	Work	Category	Result
1949	Sands of Iwo Jima	Best Actor	Nominated
1960	The Alamo	Best Picture	Nominated
1969	True Grit	Best Actor	Won

=== Golden Globe Awards ===
Year	Work	Category	Result
1953	—N/a	Henrietta Award (World Film Favorite – Male)	Won
1966	—N/a	Cecil B. DeMille Award	Honored
1970	True Grit	Best Actor – Motion Picture Drama	Won

=== Grammy Awards ===
Year	Work	Category	Result
1972	America, Why I Love Her	Best Spoken Word Album	Nominated

=== Brass Balls Award ===
In 1973, The Harvard Lampoon, a satirical paper run by Harvard University students, invited Wayne to receive The Brass Balls Award, created in his "honor", after calling him "the biggest fraud in history". Wayne accepted the invitation as a chance to promote the recently released film McQ, and a Fort Devens Army convoy offered to drive him into Harvard Square on an armored personnel carrier. The ceremony was held on January 15, 1974, at the Harvard Square Theater. Although the convoy was met with protests by members of the American Indian Movement and others, some of whom threw snowballs, Wayne received a standing ovation from the audience when he walked onto the stage.

=== Additional awards and honors ===
- 1960, Award a star on the Hollywood Walk of Fame at 1541 Vine Street for his contribution to the motion pictures industry.
- 1970, Received the DeMolay Legion of Honor
- 1970, Received the Golden Plate Award of the American Academy of Achievement
- 1973, Awarded the Gold Medal from the National Football Foundation
- 1974, Inducted into the Hall of Great Western Performers in the National Cowboy and Western Heritage Museum
- 1978, Received the Omar Bradley Spirit of Independence Award
- 1979, Received the Congressional Gold Medal
- 1980, Awarded the Presidential Medal of Freedom, the nation's highest civilian honor, by President Jimmy Carter
- 1986, Inducted into the DeMolay Hall of Fame
- There is a street named after Wayne in San Antonio, Texas

== See also ==
- John Wayne filmography
