= Esperanza Baur =

Mexican actress (1920–1961)

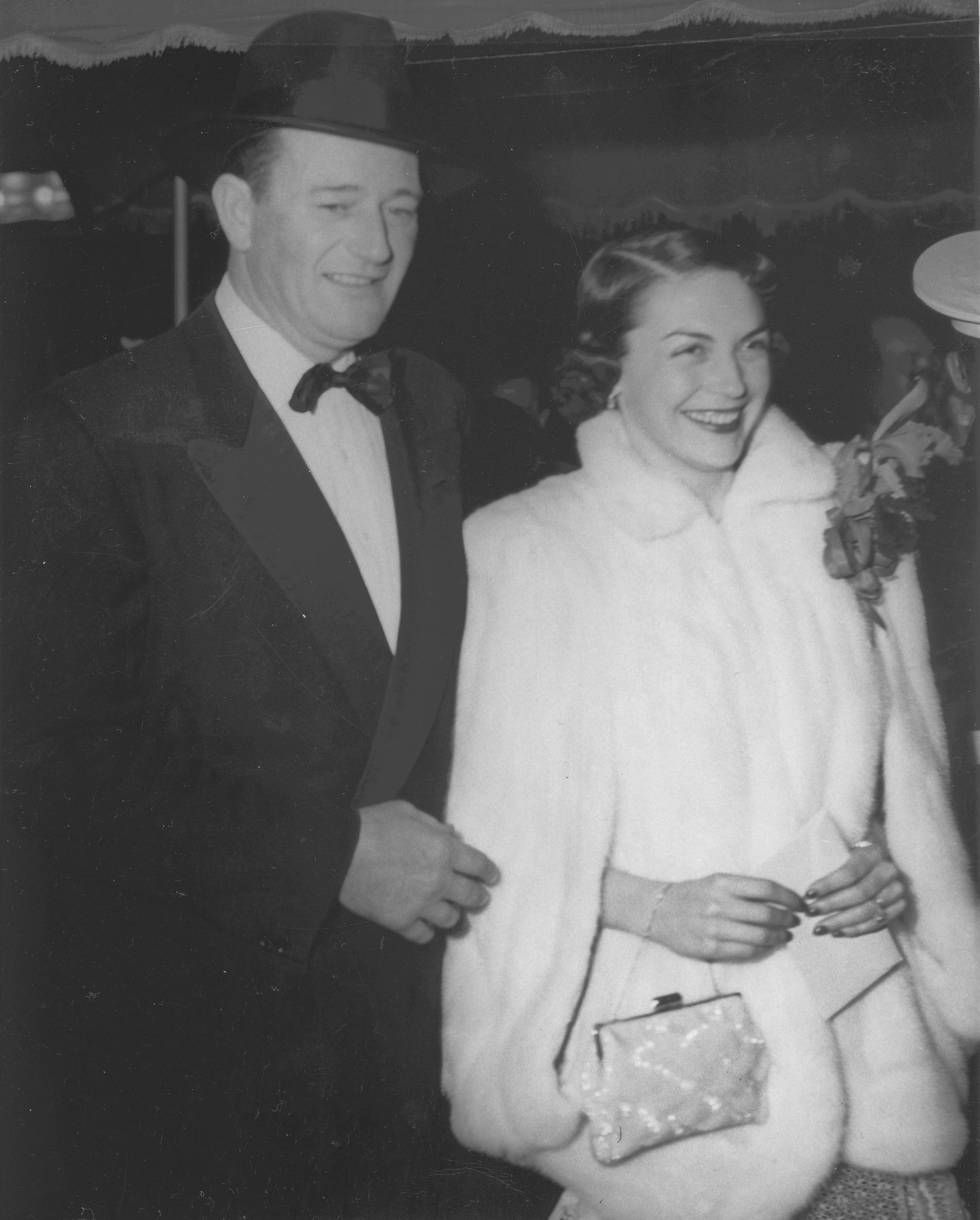
- Baur with John Wayne at the premiere of Sands of Iwo Jima, 1949
- Born: 17 July 1920; Irapuato, Guanajuato, Mexico
- Died: 10 March 1961 (aged 40); Mexico City, Mexico
- Other names: Esperanza Morrison; Esperanza Baur Morrison
- Occupation: Actress
- Years active: 1937–1943
- Spouses: Eugene Morrison (m. 1941; div. 1943) John Wayne (m. 1946; div. 1954)
- Relatives: Michael Wayne (former stepson); Patrick Wayne (former stepson)

Signature
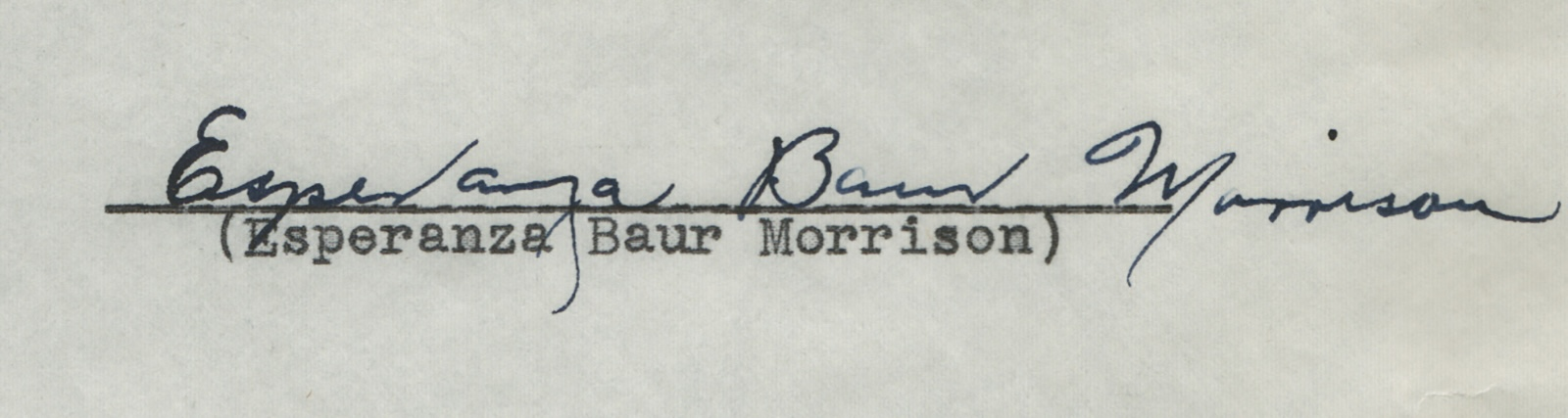

Esperanza Díaz Ceballos Baur (17 July 1920 – 10 March 1961) was a Mexican actress. Nicknamed "Chata", she became well-known through her marriage to the actor John Wayne.

== Early life ==
Esperanza Díaz Ceballos Baur was born in Irapuato, Guanajuato, Mexico on 17 July 1920, as the daughter to Carlos Díaz Ceballos and his wife, Esperanza (née Baur; 1904–1957). Her birth was registered on 8 April 1920.

== Career ==
Baur made her debut in 1937. She appeared in a small number of Spanish language films, both in leading and supporting roles, retiring in 1943.

Baur portrayed Valentina in the musical drama film La Valentina. The film was released on 4 August 1938.

Baur portrayed Valentina Villefort in the historical adventure film El conde de Montecristo. The film was released on 29 April 1942.

== Personal life ==
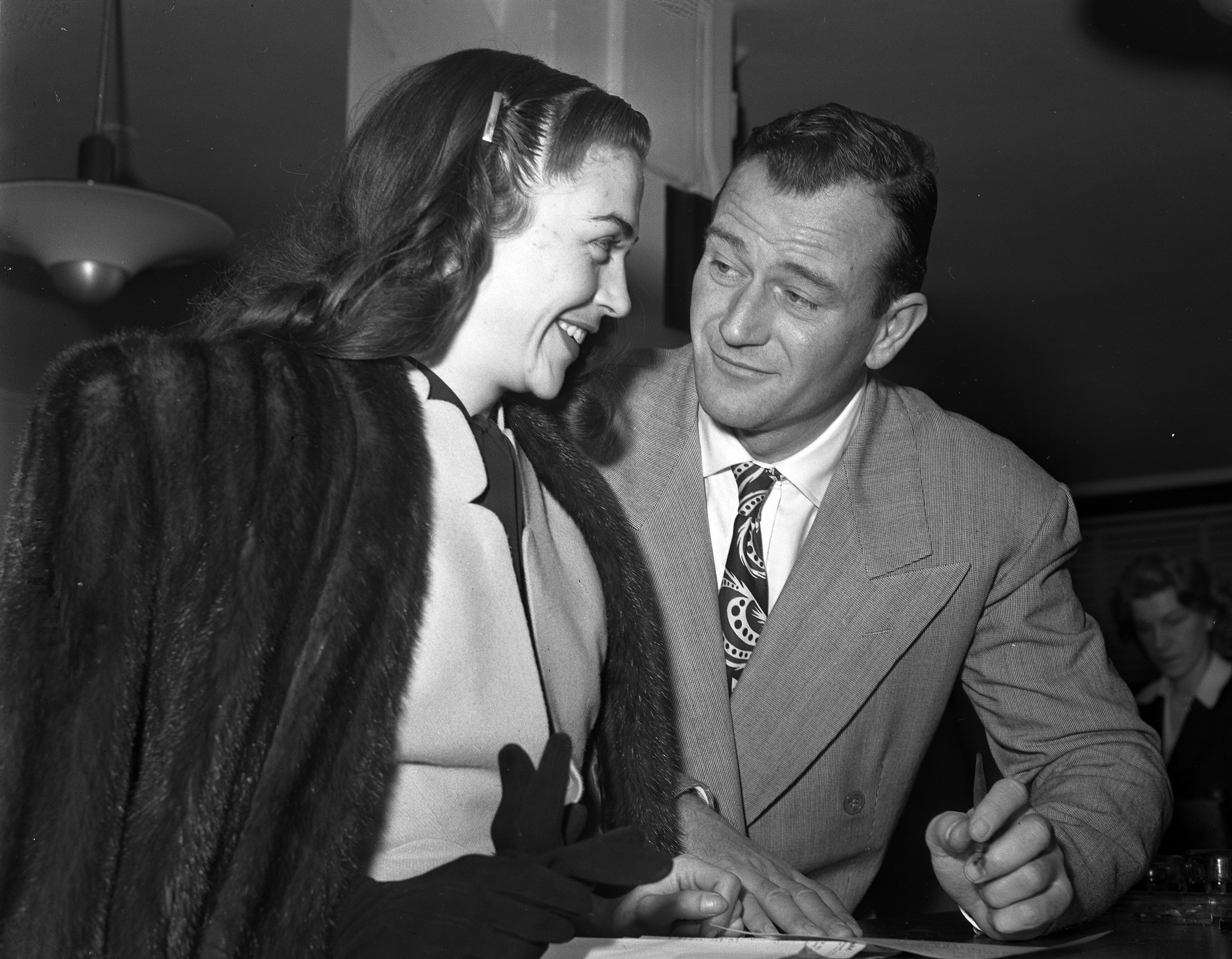
Baur and John Wayne prior to their marriage, 1946

Baur married her first husband, Eugene Colley Morrison (1917–1992), in Mexico City on 6 March 1941. The couple divorced in Dade, Florida, in 1943, after two years of marriage.

Baur met her second husband, John Wayne, an American actor, in Mexico City in 1941, while she was still married to her first husband. Wayne was vacationing there. Wayne was still married to his first wife, Josephine Alicia Saenz, but their marriage ended on Christmas Day 1945. The couple were married at the home of Wayne's mother, Mary "Molly" Alberta Brown, in Long Beach, California, on 17 January 1946. Upon her marriage to Wayne, she gained four stepchildren; Michael Wayne (1934–2003), Mary Antonia "Toni" Wayne LaCava (1936–2000), Patrick Wayne (born 1939), and Melinda Ann Wayne Munoz (1940–2022). Their marriage was rocky and volatile from the start due to her reported jealousy of his devotion to his work and to his four children. There were charges and counter-charges of unfaithfulness, drunken violence, emotional cruelty, and "clobbering". She accused Wayne of having an affair with Gail Russell, his leading lady in Angel and the Badman, which Wayne and Russell both denied. The night Angel and the Badman wrapped, the usual party was held for cast and crew, and Wayne came home very late. She was in a drunken rage by the time he arrived, and she attempted to shoot him as he walked through the front door. Wayne described his wife as a "drunken partygoer who would fall down and then accuse him of pushing her." The couple separated in May 1952. She was accused of having an affair with the hotel heir Conrad "Nicky" Hilton Jr. during divorce proceedings. Their divorce was finalized on 1 November 1954, after eight years of marriage. Wayne later commented, "Our marriage was like shaking two volatile chemicals in a jar".

Baur had no children.

== Death ==
Baur died from a heart attack in Mexico City, Mexico, on 10 March 1961. She was 40. She had lived with her aunt, Mrs. Carolina Baur, for the last few years of her life. In the announcements of her death, her age was incorrectly reported as 35 years old. Her former husband, John Wayne, was reported to be "heartsick" upon hearing the news of his ex-wife's death.

== Filmography ==
| Year | Title | Role | Ref. |
|---|---|---|---|
| 1937 | Jalisco nunca pierde | Hortensia Robles | |
| 1938 | La Valentina | Valentina | |
| 1939 | Una luz en mi camino | —N/a | |
| 1942 | El conde de Montecristo | Valentina Villefort | |
| 1943 | Guadalajara | Hortensia | |
