= The Count of Monte Cristo (1942 film) =

1942 film

- Directed by: Roberto Gavaldón; Chano Urueta
- Written by: Alexandre Dumas (novel); Chano Urueta
- Produced by: Gregorio Walerstein; Simon Wischnack
- Starring: Arturo de Córdova; Mapy Cortés; Anita Blanch
- Cinematography: Agustín Martínez Solares
- Edited by: Charles L. Kimball
- Music by: Raúl Lavista
- Production company: Cinematográfica Filmex
- Release date: 29 April 1942
- Running time: 165 minutes
- Country: Mexico
- Language: Spanish

The Count of Monte Cristo (Spanish: El Conde de Montecristo) is a 1942 Mexican historical adventure film directed by Roberto Gavaldón and Chano Urueta and starring Arturo de Córdova, Mapy Cortés, Rafael Baledón and Esperanza Baur. It is based on Alexandre Dumas's 1844 novel The Count of Monte Cristo. a story which has been adapted for film many times.

== Partial cast ==
- Arturo de Córdova as Edmundo Dantés / Conde de Montecristo
- Mapy Cortés as Haydée
- Anita Blanch as Condesa Eloisa de Villefort
- Consuelo Frank as Condesa Mercedes de Morcef
- Gloria Marín as Baronesa Herminia de Danglars
- Miguel Arenas as Gerardo Villefort
- Julio Villarreal as Abate Faria
- Carlos López Moctezuma as Baron Danglars
- Esperanza Baur as Valentina Villefort
- Rafael Baledón as Maximiliano Morrel
- Abel Salazar as Alberto de Morcef
- Tito Junco as Luciano Debray
- Amparo Morillo
- Víctor Velázquez as Beauchamp
- José Morcillo as Gaspard Caderousse
- Agustín Isunza
- Blanca Rosa Otero
- René Cardona as Fernando Mondego / Conde de Morcef
- Domingo Soler as Señor Morell
