= La Valentina (1938 film) =

1938 film

- Directed by: Martín de Lucenay
- Screenplay by: Antonio Martínez Cuetara; Ángel Rabanal
- Starring: Jorge Negrete; Esperanza Baur; Raúl de Anda
- Cinematography: Jack Draper
- Music by: Max Urban
- Production company: Atlántida Films
- Release date: 3 August 1938 (Mexico)
- Running time: 75 minutes
- Country: Mexico
- Language: Spanish

La Valentina is a 1938 Mexican ranchera musical drama film directed by Martín de Lucenay and starring Jorge Negrete, Esperanza Baur and Raúl de Anda. Set during the Mexican Revolution, its title and central character were inspired by the popular corrido "La Valentina", rather than by a biographical account of the woman associated with the song.

The film was Negrete's second feature-length production and the first in which he portrayed the singing charro, the screen persona with which he later became closely identified.

== Plot ==
In the village of Santa Úrsula, a revolutionary leader known as El Tigre heads an armed uprising. Valentina, the daughter of local landowner Don Fructuoso, plans to elope with the charro Miguel because her father opposes their relationship. El Tigre also falls in love with Valentina and deceives her before carrying her away to his camp. He treats her courteously and attempts to win her affection while Miguel looks for a way to recover her.

Miguel eventually overpowers El Tigre and takes Valentina away, but then attempts to force himself on her. She is rescued before he can do so. The two rivals later meet at a celebration organised by Don Laureano and fight a prolonged duel involving horses, pistols, machetes and lassos, which El Tigre wins.

Valentina returns to her parents, who forgive El Tigre after learning how he treated her. Valentina acknowledges that she has fallen in love with him, while El Tigre and Miguel reconcile. The revolutionaries lay down their weapons and return to agricultural work.

== Cast ==
The credited and supporting cast includes the following performers:

- Jorge Negrete as El Tigre
- Esperanza Baur as Valentina
- Raúl de Anda as Miguel
- Paco Astol as Celedonio
- Pepe Martínez as Hilario
- Paco Martínez as Don Laureano
- Alfredo Varela Sr. as Don Fructuoso
- Elisa Christy as Lucía
- Sofía Haller
- Consuelo Segarra
- David Valle González
- Roberto Y. Palacios

== Production and release ==
Lucenay adapted a story by Ángel Rabanal and Antonio Martínez Cuetara. Roberto Gavaldón served as assistant director, while Jack Draper was responsible for the cinematography. The score was composed by Max Urban, and the 75-minute black-and-white film was produced by Atlántida Films.

Production began in February 1938. The film premiered at the Cine Encanto in Mexico City on 3 August 1938.

== Reception and analysis ==
In a contemporary review published in the magazine Hoy, Mexican writer and critic Xavier Villaurrutia considered La Valentina inferior to other films of its genre. He criticised its thin narrative, limited characterisation and abrupt changes in the behaviour of its principal characters. Villaurrutia also argued that the filmmakers had failed to make effective dramatic use of the Revolutionary setting.

Film historian Hugo Lara Chávez later described the Revolution as serving primarily as a backdrop for the film's presentation of charro and rural folklore. He placed the film within the conventions of the comedia ranchera that had developed following the success of Allá en el Rancho Grande in 1936. Lara Chávez also interpreted the conclusion, in which the opposing sides reconcile and return to farming, as a restoration of the existing social order rather than a depiction of revolutionary change.
