= Verley =

Verley is a surname. Notable people with the surname include:

- Ava Deluca-Verley (born 1989), French-American actress
- Bernard Verley (born 1939), French actor and producer
- Bertie Verley (1873–1907), Jamaican cricketer
- Ilona Verley, Canadian-American drag queen
- Ivy de Verley (1879–1963), Jamaican artist
- Renaud Verley (born 1945), French actor, brother of Bernard
