= Fort Charles (Jamaica) =

Historical landmark in Port Royal, Jamaica

- Port Royal, Jamaica
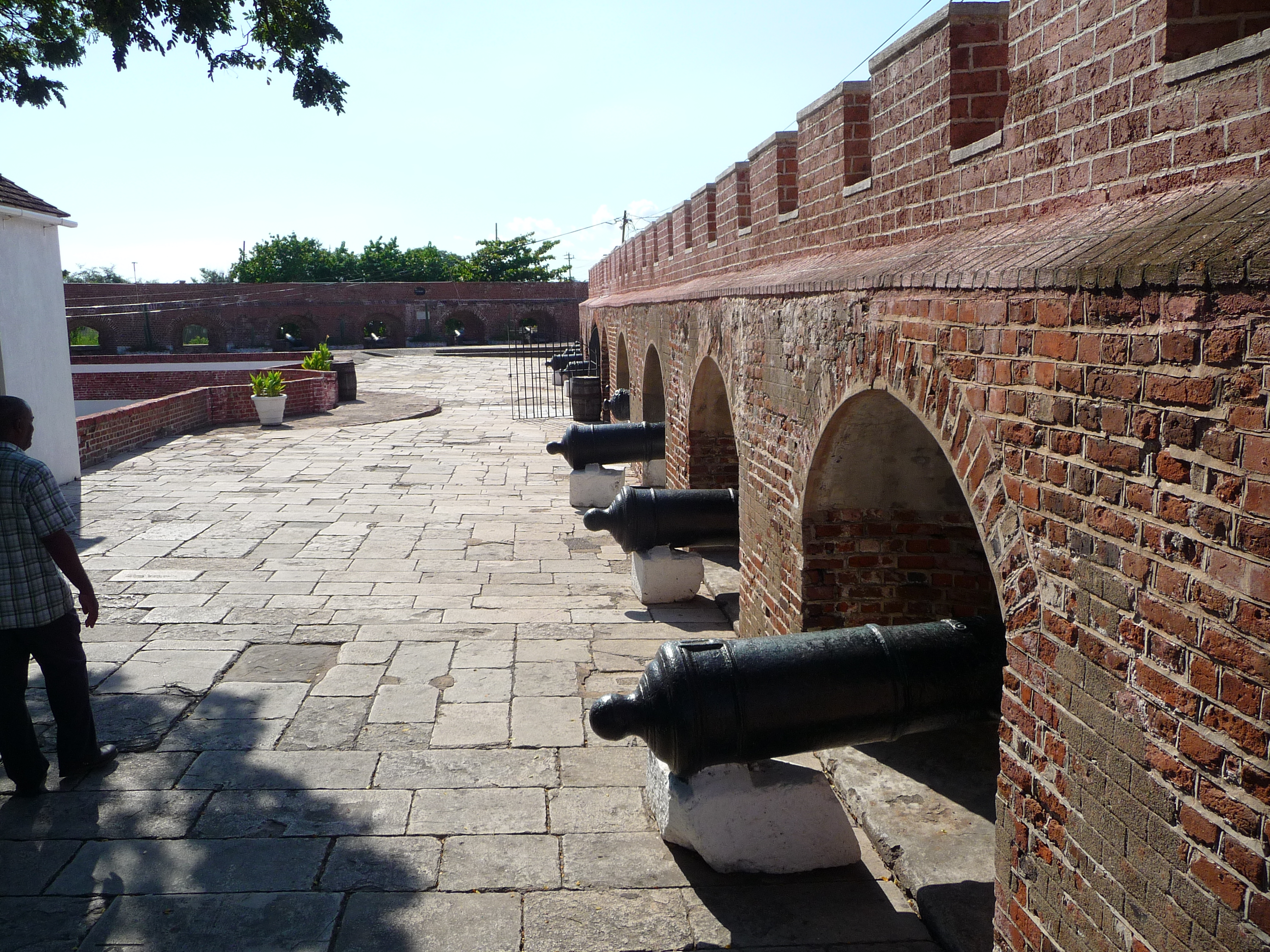
- King's battery at Fort Charles

Site information
- Owner: Government of Jamaica
- Open to the public: Yes

Location
- Location within Jamaica
- Coordinates: 17.935048°N 76.842475°W

Site history
- Built: c. 1655
- In use: No
- Materials: brick

Fort Charles was built between 1650 and 1660, the first fort constructed in Port Royal, Jamaica.

== Location ==
Fort Charles is located in the small town of Port Royal in Jamaica. The town was founded on a natural harbour and Fort Charles was constructed to guard its entrance. According to Donny L. Hamilton, the fort was situated at the tip of the sand spit separating Kingston Harbour from the Caribbean. The fort is almost completely surrounded by water.

== History ==
In 1654, Jamaica was under Spanish control and Spain was at war with England. Oliver Cromwell, Lord Protector of England, sent an expedition to invade the Spanish island Hispaniola. When the expedition failed, its leaders did not want to return home in shame. They turned their attention to capturing Jamaica, which was poorly defended. The buccaneer Henry Morgan was a member of the invading force led by William Penn and Venables. By May 1655, the English gained control of the island, and began construction of a fortified stronghold to defend their new acquisition. The fort was completed in 1655 and was the first of six forts to be built and manned by a garrison in Jamaica. It was initially referred to as Passage Fort and after it was finished it was given the name "Fort Cromwell" in honour of the patron of the expedition and leader of the Commonwealth at the time. However, it received its present name after the restoration of the monarchy under Charles II.

By 1667 it had 36 guns while in 1765 it had 104 guns and a garrison of 500 men. It was damaged by both the 1692 Jamaica earthquake and the 1907 Kingston earthquake, which later resulted in the tilting of the Giddy House, now a minor tourist attraction.

The other fort guarding Kingston Harbor is now the Fort Augusta Adult Correctional Centre

== Scenery ==
Fort Charles was built in the shape of a ship. According to Don Philpott, the fort is very well preserved with its rows of semi-circular gun ports. Along every other row of the outer wall of the fort are cannons lined adjacently. Amitabh Sharma described the fort for the Jamaica Gleaner as a “red-bricked asymmetrical fortification [that] once stood guard, warding off intruders and intimidating them with a battery of high calibre guns that were strategically mounted in the periphery”.

== The Fort today ==
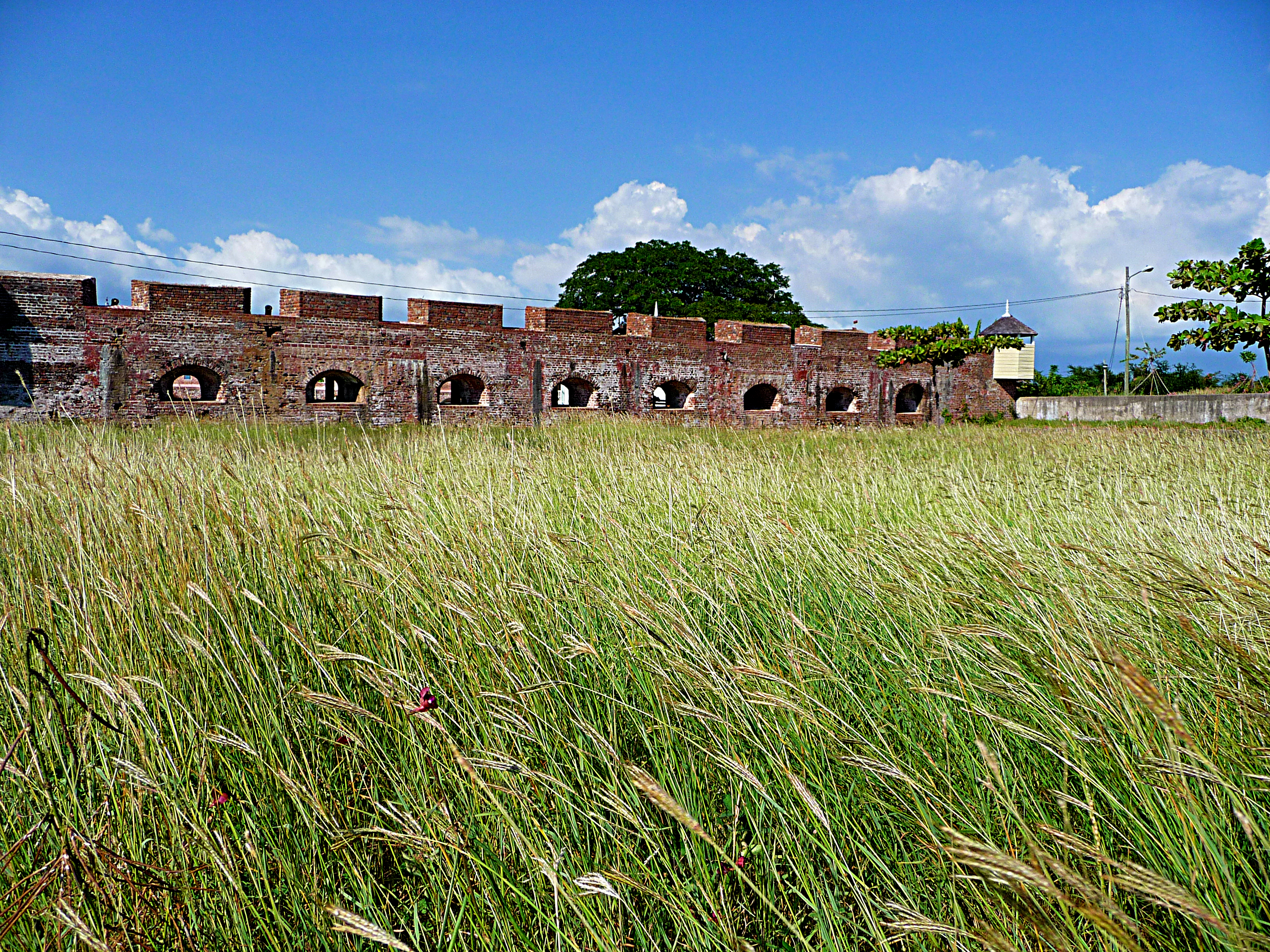
Fort Charles

Today, Fort Charles is still standing tall. After the numerous hurricanes and earthquakes, the fort did undergo some natural changes. The set up of the lined cannons on the outside wall is fairly the same. The only thing that differs from before the earthquake in 1692 is that there is now a museum located inside of the fort.
