= Cloninger =

Cloninger is a surname. Notable people with the surname include:

- Claire Cloninger (d. 2019), American songwriter, author and speaker
- C. Robert Cloninger (born 1944), American psychiatrist and geneticist
- Ralph Cloninger (1888–1962), American actor
- Tony Cloninger (1940–2018), American baseball player
