= Port Royal =

Former town in Kingston Parish, Jamaica

Port Royal Puot Rayal
- City
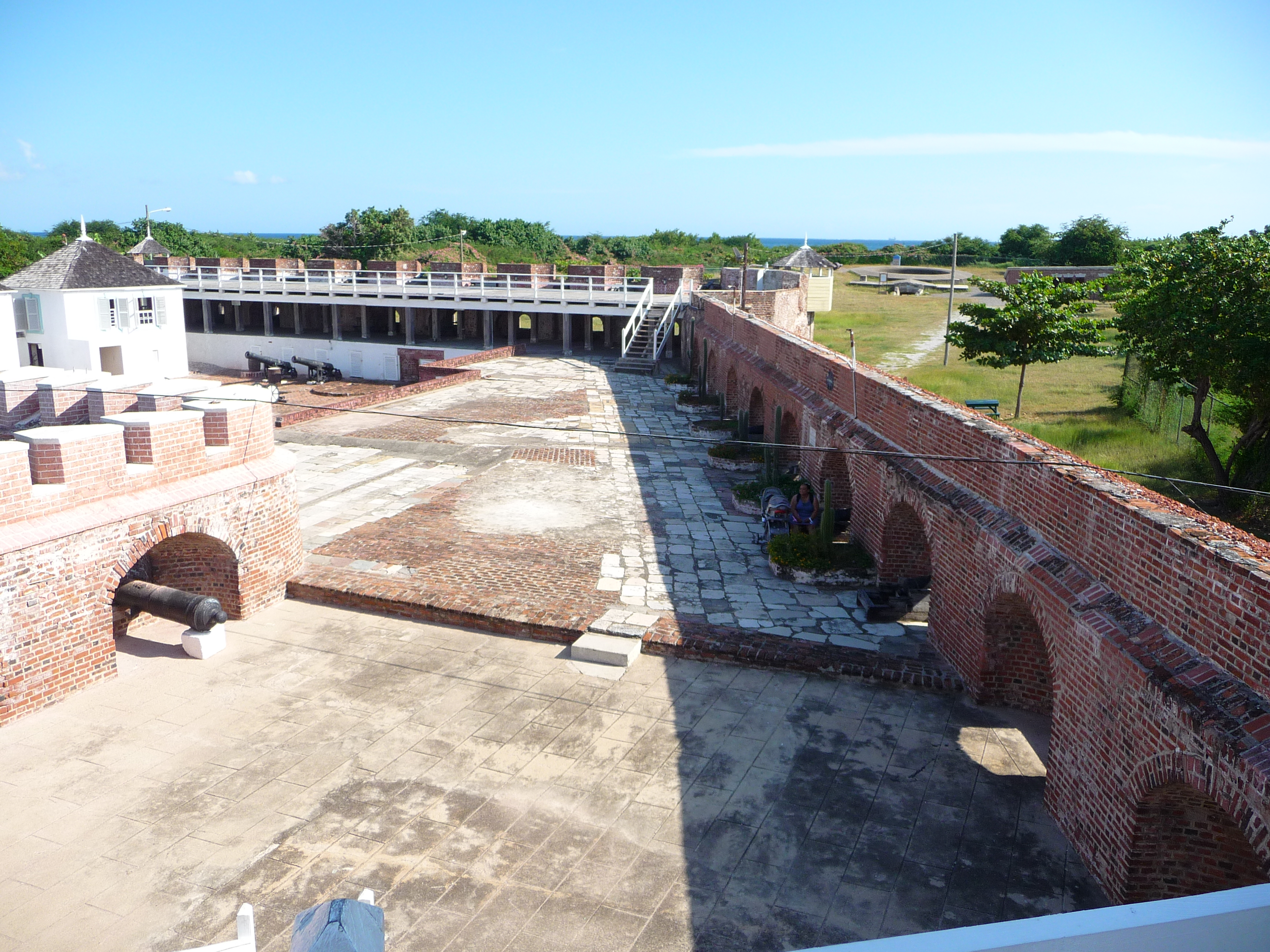
- View of the Fort Charles

- Location within Jamaica
- Coordinates: 17°56′15″N 76°50′28″W
- Country: Jamaica
- Parish: Kingston
- Founded: 1494
- Largely destroyed: 1692

Population (2022)
  - Total: 3,144

UNESCO World Heritage Site
- Official name: The Archaeological Ensemble of 17th Century Port Royal
- Type: Cultural
- Criteria: iv, vi
- Designated: 2025
- Reference no.: 1595
- UNESCO region: Latin America and the Caribbean

Port Royal (Jamaican Patois: Puot Rayal) is a small town located at the end of the Palisadoes, at the mouth of Kingston Harbour, in southeastern Jamaica.

Founded in 1494 by the Spanish, it was once the largest and most prosperous city in the Caribbean, functioning as the centre of shipping and commerce in the Caribbean Sea by the latter half of the 17th century. It was destroyed by an earthquake on 7 June 1692 and its accompanying tsunami, leading to the establishment of Kingston, which would later become the capital and the most populated city in Jamaica. Severe hurricanes have regularly damaged the area. Another severe earthquake occurred in 1907.

Port Royal became home port to English and Dutch government sponsored privateers who were encouraged to attack Spanish vessels, at a time when many European nations were reluctant to attack the powerful Spanish fleet directly. As a port city, it was notorious for its gaudy displays of wealth and loose morals, with the privateer crews spending their treasure in the many taverns, gambling houses, and brothels which catered to the sailors. When the British and Dutch governments officially abandoned the practice of issuing letters of marque to privateers against the Spanish treasure fleets and possessions in South America in the later 16th century, many of the crews turned pirate to allow themselves to maintain their plundering illegally. Port Royal effectively became a pirate republic, and they continued to use the city as their main base during the 17th century. Pirates from around the world congregated at Port Royal, coming from waters as far away as Madagascar. The town became notorious in folklore as "the wickedest city on Earth".

After the 1692 disaster, Port Royal's commercial role was steadily taken over by the rapidly growing nearby town (and later, city) of Kingston. Plans were developed in 1999 to redevelop the small fishing town as a heritage tourism destination to serve cruise ships. The plan was to capitalize on Port Royal's unique and fascinating heritage, with archaeological findings from pre-colonial and privateering years as the basis of possible attractions.

In 2022, the village has 3,144 inhabitants.

== Climate ==
Port Royal has a tropical savanna climate (Köppen climate classification Aw) with a short dry season from January to April and a lengthy wet season from May to October. Temperatures remain steady throughout the year with the dry season being slightly cooler and range from 25.5 °C (77.9 °F) in January to 27.7 °C (81.9 °F) in May. The average annual precipitation is 1,345 millimetres (53 in).

== History ==
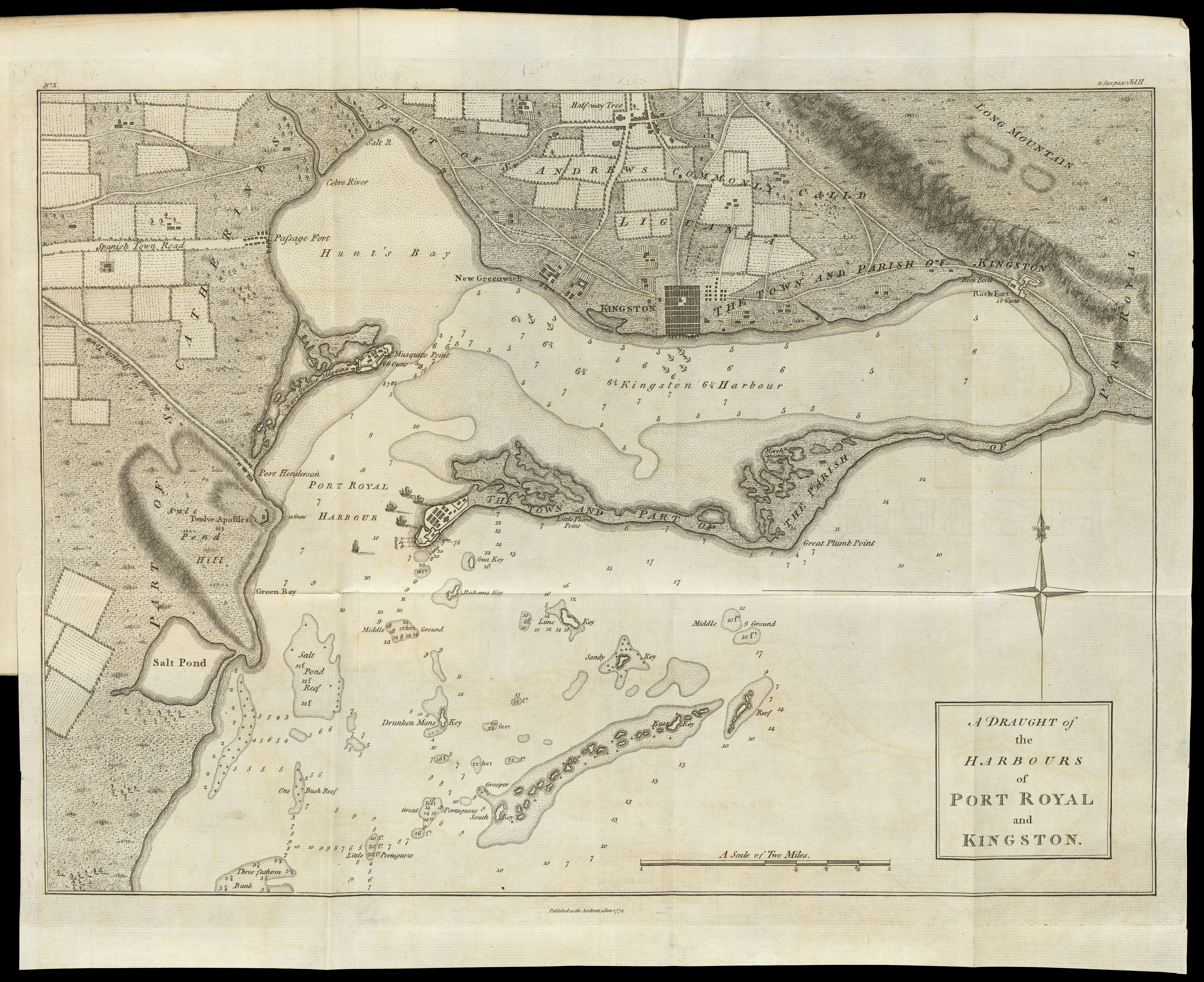
Port Royal and Kingston Harbour (1774). Port Royal is the small town at the tip of the peninsula in the top left quadrant of the map at the bottom center, at the mouth of Port Royal Harbour.

The Taino historic indigenous people of the Caribbean occupied this area for centuries before European settlement. They used the area, which they called Caguay or Caguaya, during their fishing expeditions. Although it is not known whether they ever settled at the spot, they did inhabit other parts of Jamaica.

=== Colonisation ===
The Spanish first landed in Jamaica in 1494 under the leadership of Christopher Columbus, leading to the destruction of the Taino population. Permanent settlement occurred when Juan de Esquivel brought a group of settlers in 1509. They came in search of new lands and valuable resources, like gold and silver. Instead they began to cultivate and process the sugar cane. Much like the Taino before them, the Spanish did not appear to have much use for the Port Royal area. They did, however, retain its Taino name. Spain kept control of Jamaica mostly so that it could prevent other countries from gaining access to the island, which was strategically situated within the trade routes of the Caribbean. Spain maintained control over the island for 146 years, until the English took control following their invasion of 1655.

The town was captured by England in 1655 during the invasion of Jamaica. By 1659 two hundred houses, shops and warehouses had been built around the fort; by 1692 five forts defended the port. The English initially called the place Cagway but soon renamed it Port Royal. For much of the period between the English conquest and the 1692 earthquake, Port Royal served as the unofficial capital of Jamaica, while Spanish Town remained the official capital. In 1872 the government designated Kingston, the largest city, as the capital.

=== Privateering ===
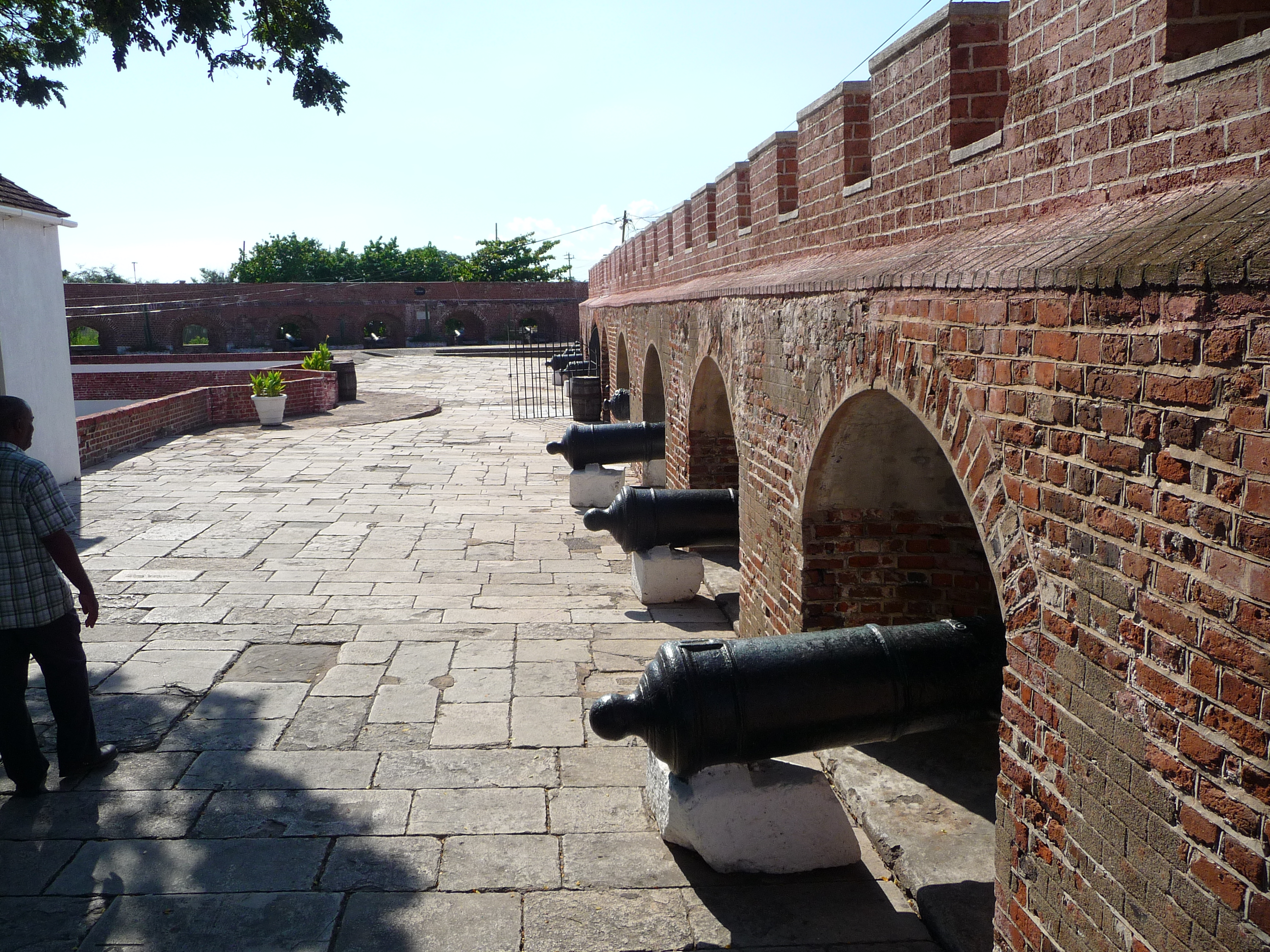
Port Royal Fort defences

Port Royal provided a safe harbour initially for privateers and subsequently for pirates plying the shipping lanes to and from Spain and Panama. Buccaneers found Port Royal appealing for several reasons. Its proximity to trade routes allowed them easy access to prey, but the most important advantage was the port's proximity to several of the only safe passages or straits giving access to the Spanish Main from the Atlantic. The harbour was large enough to accommodate their ships and the shallow waters provided a place to careen and repair these vessels with no difficulty. It was also ideally situated for launching raids on Spanish settlements. From Port Royal, Christopher Myngs sacked Campeche and Henry Morgan attacked Panama, Portobello, and Maracaibo. Additionally, buccaneers Roche Brasiliano, John Davis and Edward Mansvelt used Port Royal as a base of operations.

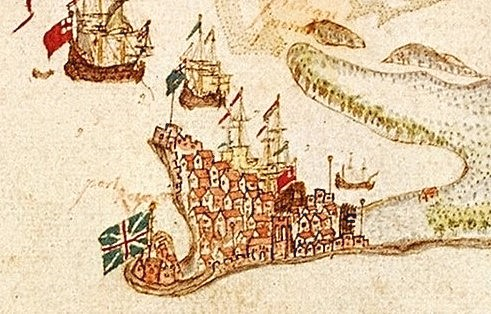
Port Royal in the 17th century, before the devastating earthquake in 1692

In 1657, as a solution to his defence concerns, Governor Edward D'Oyley invited the Brethren of the Coast to come to Port Royal and make it their home port. The Brethren was a group of pirates descended from cattle-hunting boucaniers (later anglicized to buccaneers), who had turned to piracy after being robbed by the Spanish (and subsequently thrown out of Hispaniola). These pirates concentrated their attacks on Spanish shipping, whose interests were considered the major threat to the town.

The English privateers were given letters of marque by Jamaica's governor. Around the same time that pirates were invited to Port Royal, England launched a series of attacks against Spanish shipping vessels and coastal towns. By sending the newly appointed privateers after Spanish ships and settlements, England had successfully set up a system of defence for Port Royal. Spain was forced to continually defend their possessions from attack, providing them with no opportunity and no means with which to attempt to retake the land.

Spain was unable to retake the island and, due to the privateers, could no longer regularly provide their colonies in the New World with manufactured goods. The progressive irregularity of annual Spanish fleets, combined with an increasing demand by colonies for manufactured goods, stimulated the growth of Port Royal. Merchants and privateers worked together in what is now referred to as "forced trade". Merchants would sponsor trading endeavors with the Spanish, while also sponsoring privateers to attack Spanish ships and rob Spanish coastal towns. While the merchants most certainly had the upper hand, the privateers were an integral part of the operation.

Nuala Zahedieh, a lecturer at the University of Edinburgh, wrote: "Both opponents and advocates of so-called 'forced trade' declared the town's fortune had the dubious distinction of being founded entirely on the servicing of the privateers' needs and highly lucrative trade in prize commodities.". "A report that the 300 men who accompanied Henry Morgan to Portobello in 1668 returned to the town with a prize to spend of at least £60 each (two or three times the usual annual plantation wage) leaves little doubt that they were right".

The forced trade became almost a way of life in Port Royal. Michael Pawson and David Busseret wrote "...one way or the other nearly all the propertied inhabitants of Port Royal seem to have an interest in privateering." Forced trade was rapidly making Port Royal one of the wealthiest communities in the English territories of North America, far surpassing any profit made from the production of sugar cane. Zahedieh wrote, "The Portobello raid [in 1668] alone produced plunder worth £75,000, more than seven times the annual value of the island's sugar exports, which at Port Royal prices did not exceed £10,000 at this time."

Since the English lacked sufficient troops to prevent either the Spanish or French from seizing it, the Jamaican governors eventually turned to the pirates to defend the city. By the 1660s, the city had, for some, become a pirate utopia and had gained a reputation as the "Sodom of the New World", where most residents were pirates, cutthroats, or prostitutes. When Charles Leslie wrote his history of Jamaica, he included a description of the pirates of Port Royal:

Wine and women drained their wealth to such a degree that [...] some of them became reduced to beggary. They have been known to spend 2 or 3,000 pieces of eight in one night; and one gave a strumpet 500 to see her naked. They used to buy a pipe of wine, place it in the street, and oblige everyone that passed to drink from it.

The taverns of Port Royal were known for their excessive consumption of alcohol such that records even exist of the wild animals of the area partaking in the debauchery. During a passing visit, famous Dutch explorer Jan van Riebeeck is said to have described the scenes:

The parrots of Port Royal gather to drink from the large stocks of ale with just as much alacrity as the drunks that frequent the taverns that serve it.

Genealogical research indicates that Blackbeard (Edward Teach) and his family moved to Jamaica where Edward Thatch Jr. is listed as being a mariner in the Royal Navy aboard HMS Windsor in 1706. Port Royal benefited from this lively, glamorous infamy and grew to be one of the two largest towns and the most economically important port in the English colonies. At the height of its popularity, the city had one drinking house for every 10 residents. In July 1661 alone, 40 new licenses were granted to taverns. During a 20-year period that ended in 1692, nearly 10,000 people lived in Port Royal. In addition to prostitutes and buccaneers, there were four goldsmiths, 44 tavern keepers, and a variety of artisans and merchants who lived in 2,000 buildings crammed into 51 acres (21 ha) of real estate. 213 ships visited the seaport in 1688. The city's wealth was so great that coins were preferred for payment over the more common system of bartering goods for services.

Following Henry Morgan's appointment as lieutenant governor, Port Royal began to change. Pirates were no longer needed to defend the city. The selling of enslaved people took on greater importance. Upstanding citizens disliked the reputation the city had acquired. In 1687, Jamaica passed anti-piracy laws. Consequently, instead of being a safe haven for pirates, Port Royal became noted as their place of execution. Many were executed at Gallows Point, including Charles Vane and John Rackham, who were hanged in 1720. About five months later, the famous woman pirate Mary Read died in prison in nearby Spanish Town. Two years later, 41 pirates met their death in one month.

=== The Royal Navy ===
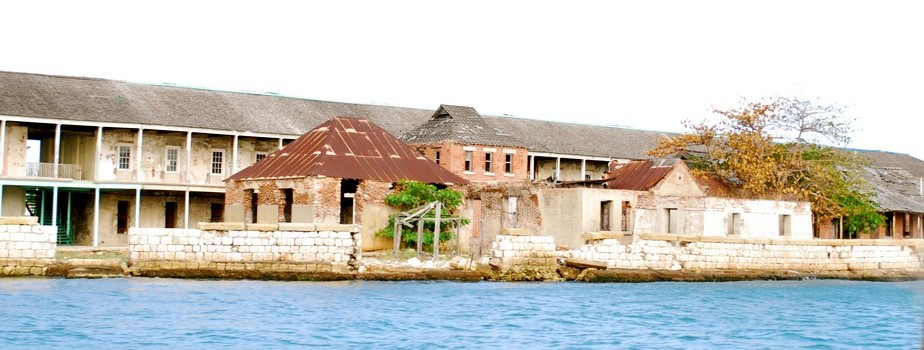
Remains of the Naval Hospital, rebuilt 1818 by Edward Holl

Under British rule the Royal Navy made use of a careening wharf at Port Royal and rented a building on the foreshore to serve as a storehouse. From 1675, a resident Naval Officer was appointed to oversee these facilities; however, development was cut short by the 1692 earthquake. After the earthquake, an attempt was made to establish a naval base at Port Antonio instead, but the climate there proved disagreeable. From 1735, Port Royal once more became the focus of the Admiralty's attention. New wharves and storehouses were built at this time, as well as housing for the officers of the Yard. Over the next thirty years, more facilities were added: cooperages, workshops, sawpits, and accommodation (including a canteen) for the crews of ships being careened there. A Royal Naval Hospital was also established on land a little to the west of the Naval Yard; and by the end of the 18th century a small Victualling Yard had been added to the east (prior to this ships had had to go to Kingston and other settlements to take on supplies).

At the start of the 19th century, a significant amount of rebuilding took place in what was by now a substantial Royal Navy Dockyard serving the fleet in the Caribbean. A sizeable storehouse with a clocktower formed the centrepiece, with a covered way leading from it to the careening wharves. The adjacent Port Admiral's (later Commodore's) House included a watch tower, to counter the threat of privateers. The Yard continued to expand to meet the new requirements of steam-powered vessels: the victualling wharf became a coaling depot in the 1840s, and twenty years later a small engineering complex was built. The Yard continued to expand through to the beginning of the 20th century, but then (with the Admiralty focusing more and more on the situation in Europe) the Navy withdrew from its station in Jamaica and the Dockyard closed in 1905. (Nevertheless, the Naval Yard and Hospital remained in Admiralty ownership until after the Second World War, with part of the Yard being used by the War Department).

Many of the Dockyard buildings (most of which were of timber construction) were subsequently demolished or destroyed (some in the 1907 Kingston earthquake, others by Hurricane Charlie in 1951). A few remain in place, however, including the Naval Hospital complex, some of the steam engineering buildings and a set of officers' houses. There is also a slipway, completed in 1904, which (with its accompanying sheds) was designed for housing and launching torpedo boats, stationed there for the Yard's protection. In 2014, it was announced that some of the Historic Naval Hospital buildings would be restored to house a museum as part of a broader Port Royal Heritage Tourism Project.

=== Earthquake of 1692 ===
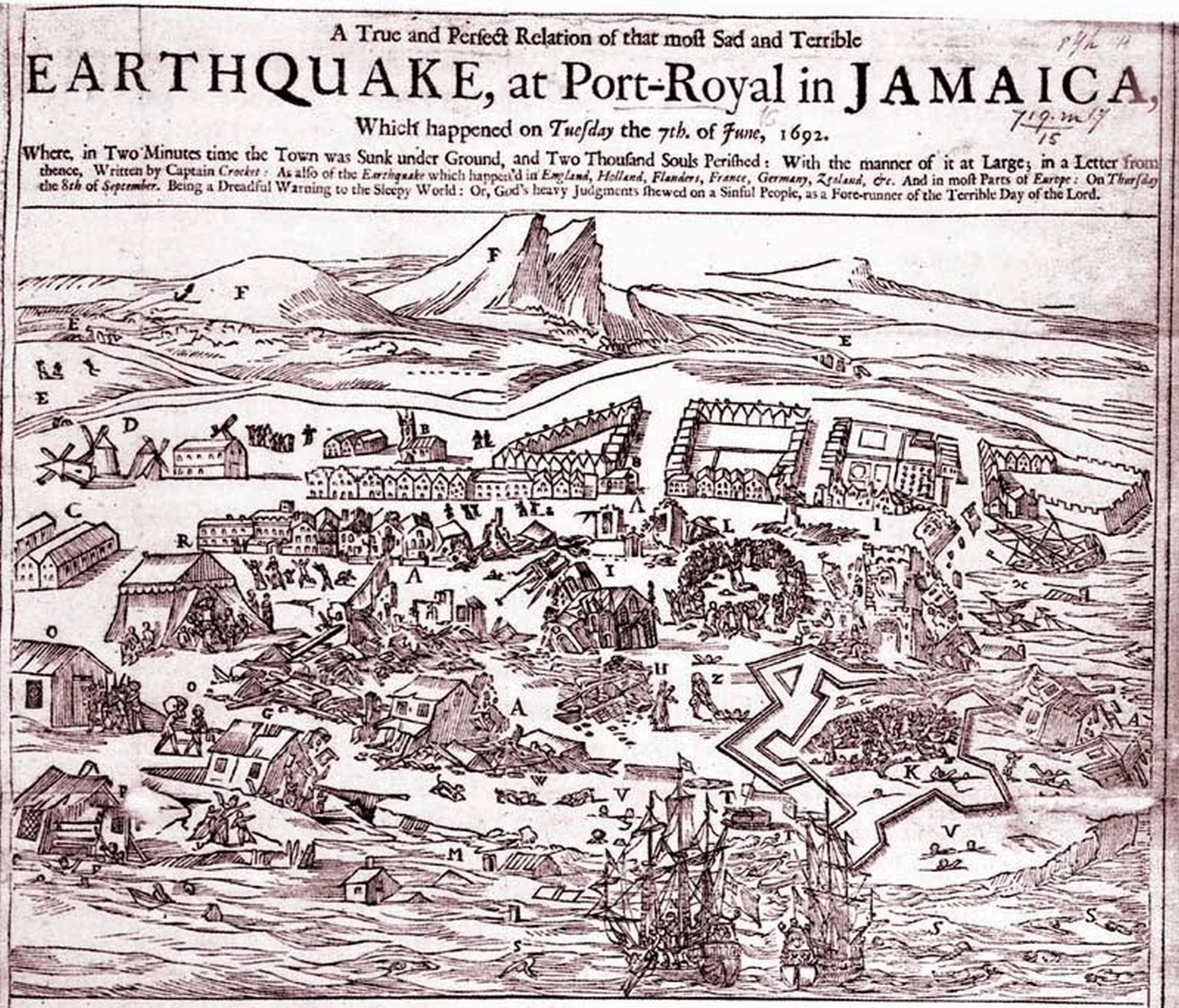
Illustration of the destruction caused by the earthquake of 7 June 1692.

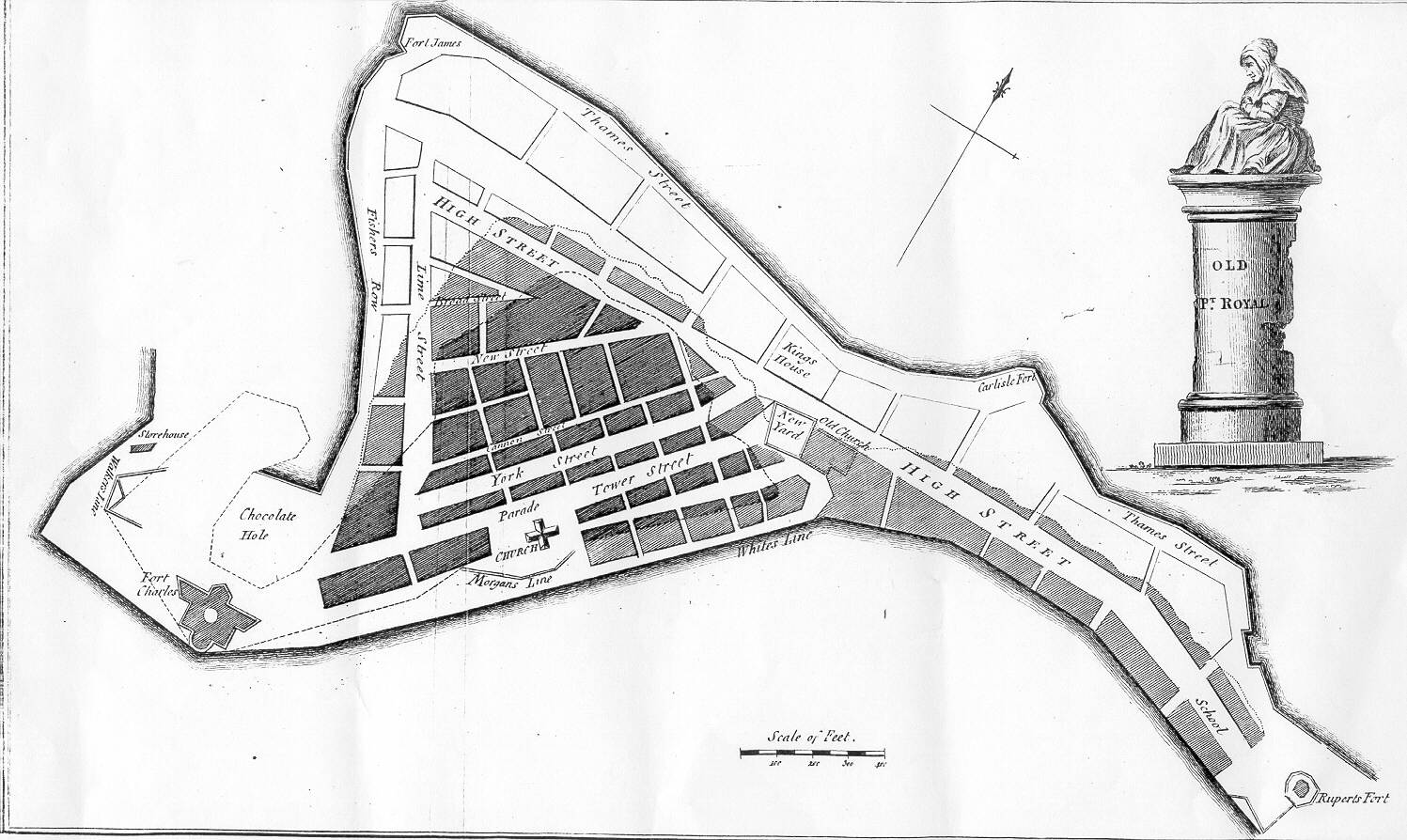
Old map of Port Royal. Light section at top and going down toward the right is the part of the city lost in the 1692 earthquake; slightly shaded middle section, the part of the city that was flooded; darkly shaded bottom section is the part of the city that survived.

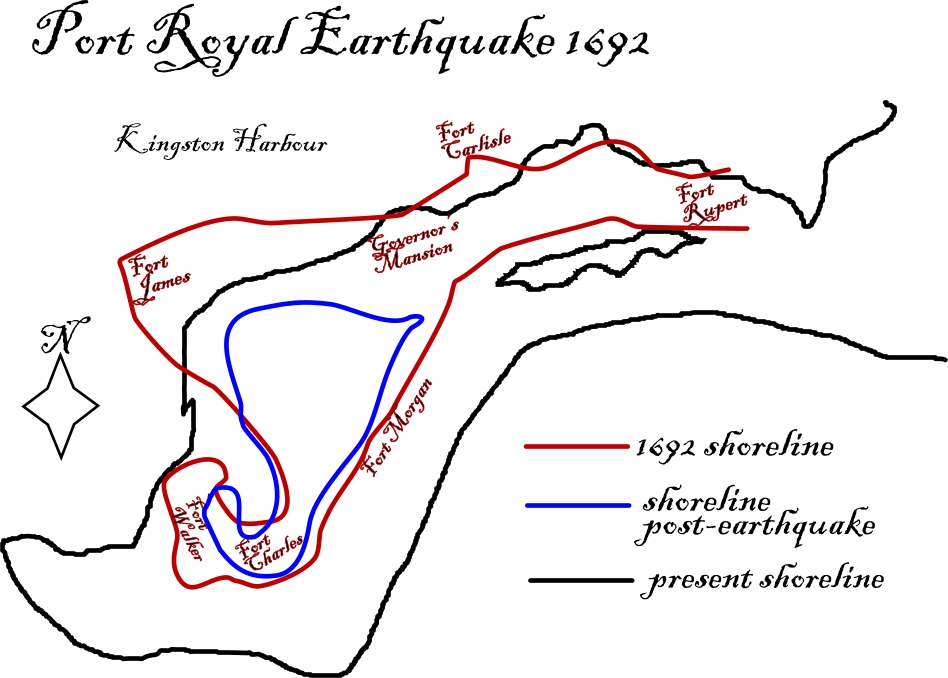
Shoreline changes in the Port Royal earthquake

The town grew rapidly, reaching a population of around 6,500 people and approximately 2,000 dwellings, by 1692. As land on which to build diminished, it became common practice to either fill in areas of water and build new infrastructure on top of it, or simply build buildings taller. Buildings gradually became heavier as the residents adopted the brick-style homes of their native England. Some urged the population to adopt the low, wooden building style of the previous Spanish inhabitants, but many refused. In the end, all of these separate factors contributed to the impending disaster.

On 7 June 1692, a devastating earthquake hit the city causing most of its northern section to be lost, and with it many of the town's houses and other buildings. Many of the forts were destroyed, as well. Fort Charles survived, but Forts James and Carlisle sank into the sea, Fort Rupert became a large region of water, and great damage was done to an area known as Morgan's Line.

Although the earthquake hit the entire island of Jamaica, the citizens of Port Royal were at a greater risk of death due to the perilous sand, falling buildings, and the tsunami that followed. Though the local authorities tried to remove or sink all of the corpses from the water, they were unsuccessful; some simply got away from them, while others were trapped in places that were inaccessible. Improper housing, a lack of medicine or clean water, and the fact that most of the survivors were homeless led to many people dying of malignant fevers. The earthquake and tsunami killed between 1,000 and 3,000 people combined, nearly half the city's population. Disease ran rampant in the next several months, killing an estimated 2,000 additional people.

The historical Jamaica earthquake of 7 June 1692 can be dated closely not only by date, but by time of day as well. This is documented by recovery from the sea floor in the 1960s of a pocket watch stopped at 11:43 a.m., recording the time of the devastating earthquake.

The earthquake caused the sand under Port Royal to liquefy and flow out into Kingston Harbour. The water table was generally only two feet down before the impact, and the town was built on a layer of some 65 feet (20 m) of water-saturated sand. This type of area did not provide a solid foundation on which to build an entire town. Unlike the Spanish before them, the English had decided to settle and develop the small area of land, even while acknowledging that the area was nothing but "hot loose sand".

According to Mulcahy, "[Modern] scientists and underwater archaeologists now believe that the earthquake was a powerful one and that much of the damage at Port Royal resulted from a process known as liquefaction." Liquefaction occurs when earthquakes strike ground that is loose, sandy, and water-saturated, increasing the water pressure and causing the particles to separate from one another and form a sludge resembling quicksand. Eyewitness accounts attested to buildings sliding into the water, but it is likely some simply sank straight down into the now unstable layer.

Underwater archaeology, some of which can be seen in the National Geographic Channel show Wicked Pirate City, reveals the foundations of building underwater, showing there was subsidence, as do comparisons of post-earthquake maps and pre-earthquake maps.

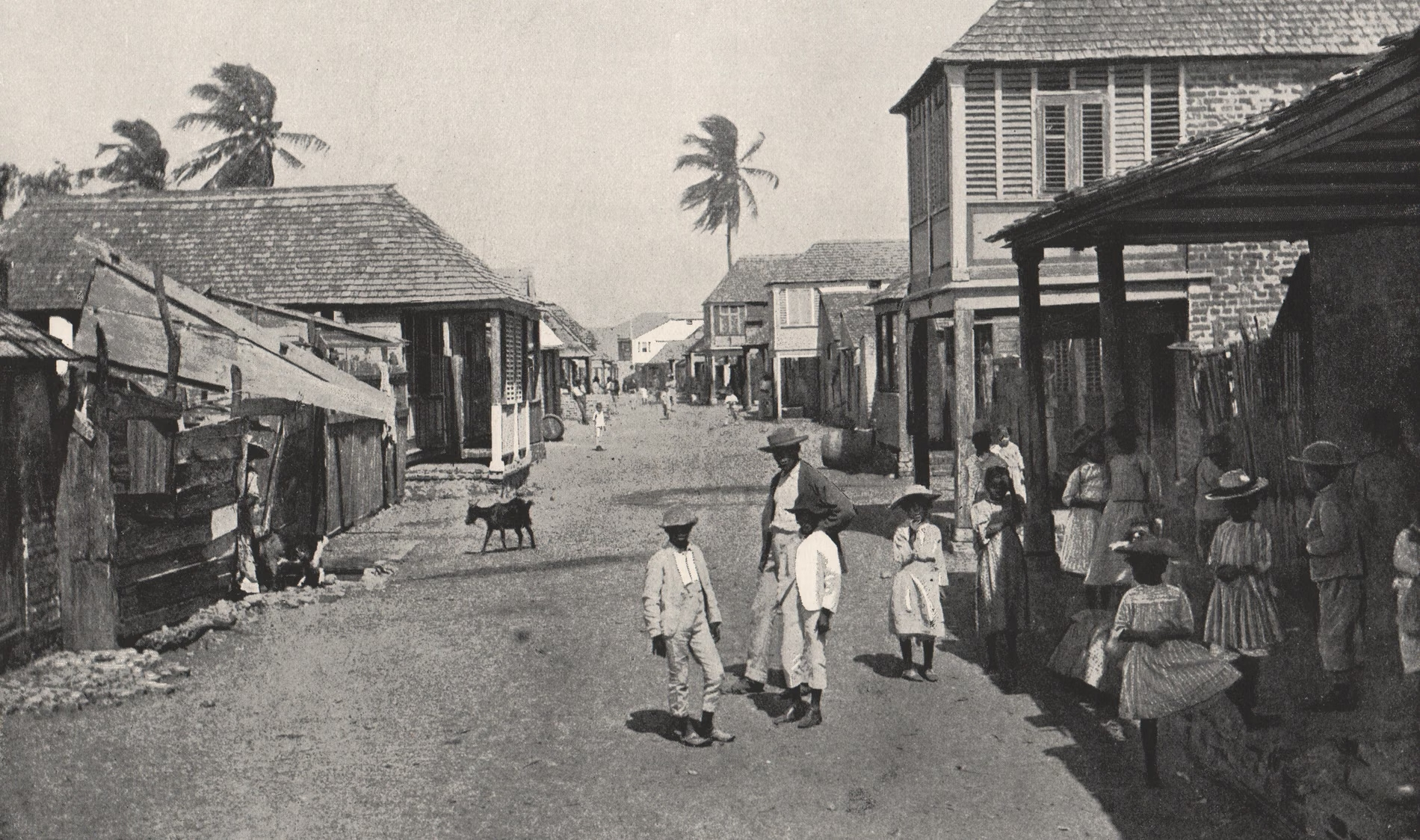
A street in rebuilt Port Royal, Jamaica, circa 1895

Some attempts were made to rebuild the city, starting with the one third that was not submerged, but these met with mixed success and numerous disasters. An initial attempt at rebuilding was again destroyed in 1703 by fire. Subsequent rebuilding was hampered by several hurricanes in the first half of the 18th century, including flooding from the sea in 1722, a further fire in 1750, and a major hurricane in 1774, and soon Kingston eclipsed Port Royal in importance. In 1815, what repairs were being undertaken were destroyed in another major fire, while the whole island was severely affected by an epidemic of cholera in 1850.

=== 1907 earthquake and recent history ===
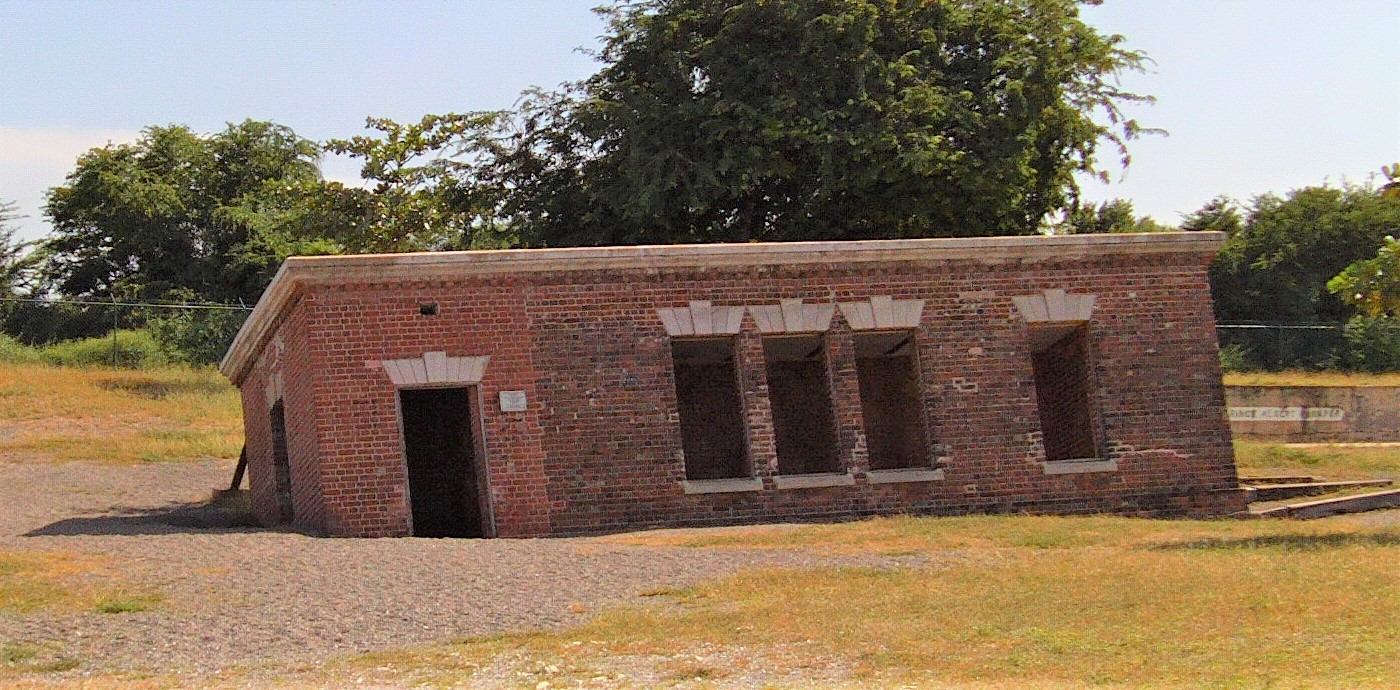
Giddy House

An earthquake on 14 January 1907 liquefied the sand spit, destroying nearly all of the rebuilt city, submerging additional portions, and tilting The Giddy House, an artillery storage room built c. 1880 that is today a minor tourist attraction.

The area is a shadow of its former self with a population of fewer than 2,000 that has little to no commercial or political importance. It is frequented by tourists, but is in a state of disrepair. The Jamaican government has resolved to further develop the area for its historic and tourist value. This is in part a result of abandonment of plans begun in the early 1960s to develop the town as a cruise ship port and destination. The plans stimulated the archaeological explorations on the site which, in turn, led to the suspension of development solely as a port but now included archaeological and other attractions.

In 1981, the Nautical Archaeology Program at Texas A&M University began a 10-year underwater archaeological investigation of the portion of Port Royal that sank underwater during the 17th century. The program focused on an area that had sunk directly into the sea and suffered very little damage. Due to very low oxygen levels, a large amount of organic material could be recovered. The efforts made by the program have allowed everyday life in the English colonial port city to be reconstructed in great detail.

In 1998, the Port Royal Development Company commissioned architectural firm The Jerde Partnership to create a master plan for the redevelopment of Port Royal, which was completed in 2000. The focus of the plan is a 17th-century-themed attraction that reflects the city's heritage. It has two anchor areas: Old Port Royal and the King's Royal Naval Dockyard. Old Port Royal features a cruise ship pier extending from a reconstructed Chocolata Hole harbour and Fisher's Row, a group of cafes and shops on the waterfront. The King's Royal Naval Dockyard features a combination shipbuilding-museum and underwater aquarium with dioramas for views of the native tropical sealife. The Royal Naval Dockyard also includes the headquarters for the Admiral of the Royal Navy. The redevelopment plan also includes a five-star hotel.

Today, Port Royal is known to post-medieval archaeologists as the "City That Sank".

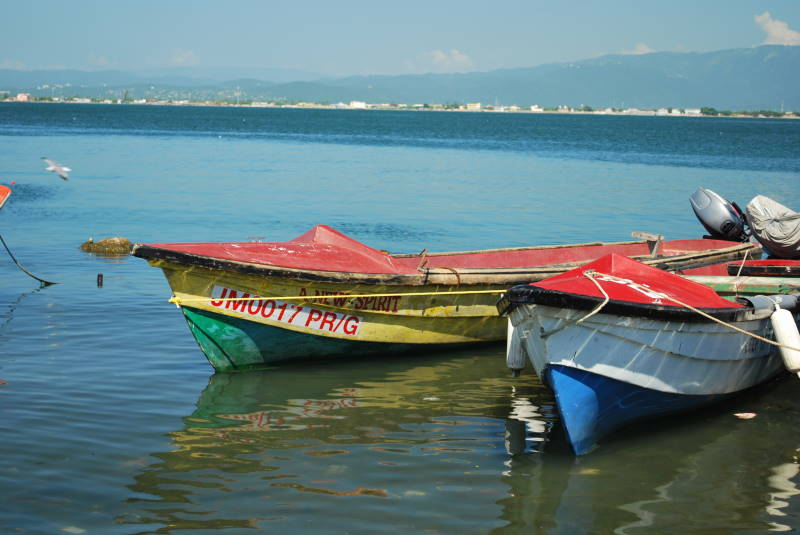
Fishing boats at Port Royal, 2010

By 2019, a floating pier where a cruise ship could dock had been built; the first ship arrived on 20 January 2020. Tourists from a few ships (after the effects of the COVID-19 pandemic have ended) might be beneficial to the town, but "there's still much work to be done if the town will become the 'world-class heritage, environmental and cultural attraction'" according to a BBC Travel report published in September 2020. Another report that month discussed the well-funded Living Heritage Programme, which was seeking "to transform the town into a SMART, safe and secure community with a vibrant local economy, preserved cultural heritage and protected natural environment".

In 2025, Port Royal was designated as a World Heritage Site by UNESCO.
