= Giddy House =

Weapons stored house in Jamaica

- Interactive map of the Giddy House area
- Former names: Royal Artillery House

General information
- Type: artillery house
- Location: Fort Charles, Port Royal, Jamaica
- Coordinates: 17.9341°N 76.8424°W
- Completed: 1888

First built in 1888 near Fort Charles, Jamaica, Giddy House was originally a Royal Artillery House meant to store weapons and gunpowder for the adjacent Victoria and Albert Battery. After Port Royal was struck by an earthquake in 1907, Giddy House partially sank into the ground as a result of soil liquefaction. Its nickname, Giddy House, comes from the feeling visitors have when trying to stand straight while inside.

== History ==
Giddy House was constructed in 1888 as a Royal Artillery House at Fort Charles. Fort Charles is one of the oldest forts in Port Royal. Located on the western end of the Palisadoes Strip, Fort Charles was built by the British after Jamaica was taken from the Spaniards. The Fort was initially named Fort Cromwell after a general at the time but was later redubbed Fort Charles. The military stronghold was initially damaged in the earthquake that rocked ‘The Most Sinful City on Earth’ in 1692; the natural disaster sunk a large portion of Port Royal and killed thousands of residents. Fort Charles was rebuilt in 1699 by the chief engineer of Jamaica at the time.

On Monday, 14 January 1907, an earthquake almost leveled Kingston and Port Royal. The damage in Kingston amounted to 2 million pounds, and around 800 people had been killed. In Port Royal, 180 meters of the coastline had sunken as well. It was in this earthquake that much of Fort Charles and the Giddy House had been destroyed. Many of the fort’s cannon and guns sunk into the sand, its buildings and docks were badly damaged. Some areas of the fort had disappeared altogether. Giddy House received its name from the odd angle at which the building is tilted.

Recently, Jamaica’s Tourist Enhancement Fund (TEF) designated 72 million Jamaican dollars to the enhancement town of Port Royal, as well as maintaining the heritage sites.

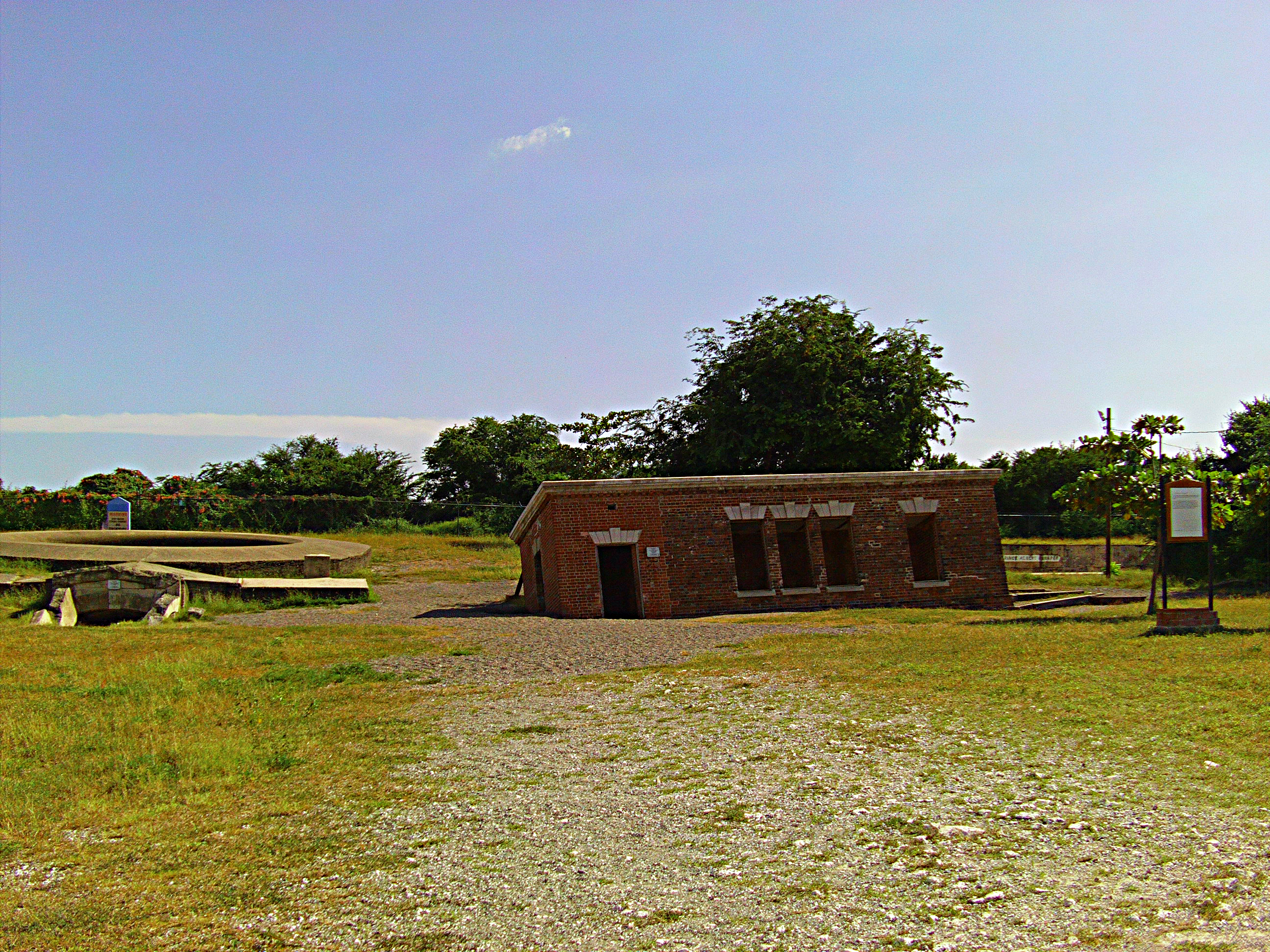
Giddy House

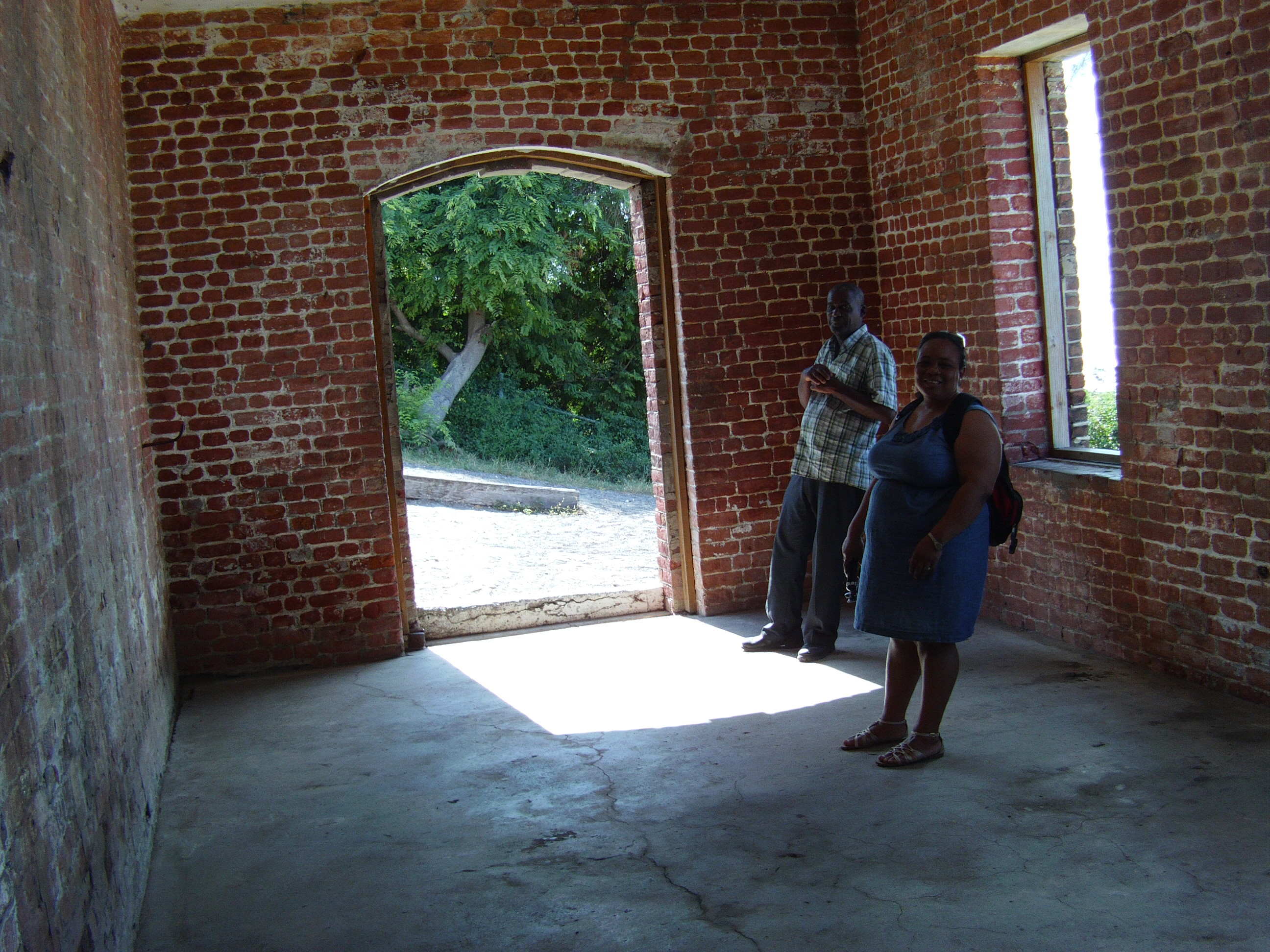
The extent of sinking inside Giddy House
