= Monte Cristo (1922 film) =

1922 film by Emmett J. Flynn

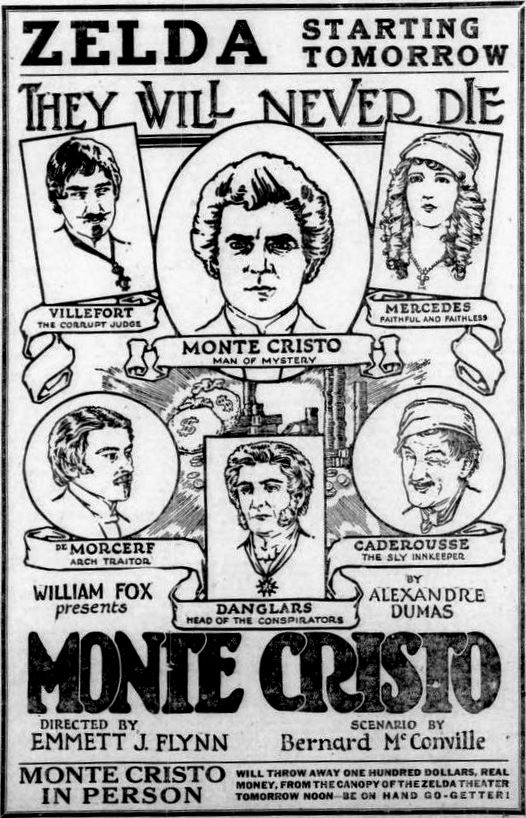
- Theatrical release poster
- Directed by: Emmett J. Flynn
- Written by: Charles Fechter (play); Alexander Salvini (adaptation); Bernard McConville (scenario)
- Based on: The Count of Monte Cristo by Alexandre Dumas
- Produced by: William Fox
- Starring: John Gilbert
- Cinematography: Lucien Andriot
- Production company: Fox Film Corporation
- Release dates: April 1, 1922 (Premiere); September 3, 1922; April 1927 (Re-release)
- Running time: 100 minutes
- Country: United States
- Language: Silent (English intertitles)

Monte Cristo

Monte Cristo is a 1922 American silent drama film produced and distributed by Fox Film Corporation and directed by Emmett J. Flynn. It is based on the 1844 novel The Count of Monte Cristo by Alexandre Dumas, which was adapted by 19th century thespian Charles Fechter and written for this screen version by Bernard McConville. John Gilbert plays the hero with Estelle Taylor as the leading lady. This film was long thought lost until a print surfaced in the Czech Republic. The film has been released on DVD, packaged with Gilbert's 1926 MGM film Bardelys the Magnificent.

== Plot ==
Edmond Dantes is falsely accused by those jealous of his good fortune, and is sentenced to spend the rest of his life in the notorious island prison, Chateau d'If. While imprisoned, he meets the Abbe Faria, a fellow prisoner whom everyone believes to be mad. The Abbé tells Edmond of a vast treasure hidden on a small island, the location of which only he knows. After many years in prison, the old Abbé dies, and Edmond escapes by disguising himself as the corpse. Once free, Edmond sets out to find the treasure the Abbé described, intending to use his newfound wealth to take revenge on those who wronged him.

== Cast ==
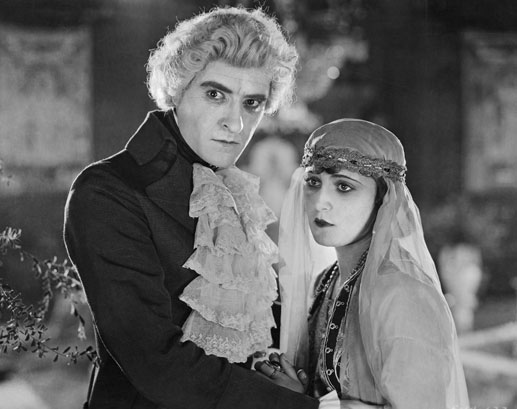
John Gilbert and Virginia Brown Faire

- John Gilbert as Edmond Dantes, the Count of Monte Cristo
- Estelle Taylor as Mercedes, Countess de Morcerf
- Robert McKim as De Villefort, the king's public prosecutor
- William V. Mong as Caderousse, the innkeeper
- Virginia Brown Faire as Haidee, an Arabian princess
- George Siegmann as Luigi Vampa, ex-pirate
- Spottiswoode Aitken as Abbe Faria
- Ralph Cloninger as Fernand, Count de Morcerf
- Albert Prisco as Baron Danglars
- Al. W. Filson as Morrel, shipowner (as Al Filson)
- Harry Lonsdale as Dantes, father of Edmond
- Francis McDonald as Benedetto
- Jack Cosgrave as Governor of Chateau d'If (as Jack Cosgrove)
- Maude George as Baroness Danglars
- Renée Adorée as Eugenie Danglars, her daughter
- Gaston Glass as Albert de Morcerf
