= Ivy de Verley =

Jamaican-born painter (1879–1963)

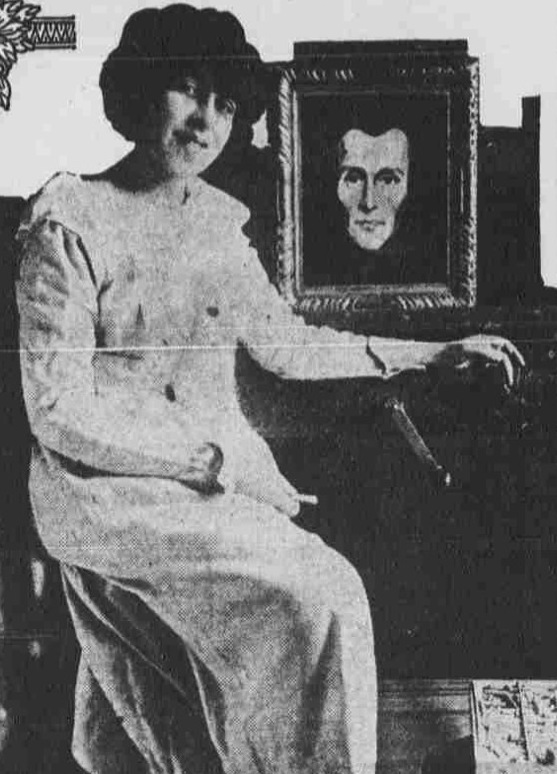
- De Verley with a "life mask" of her husband, 1920
- Born: Flossie Ivy Louise Verley; 27 July 1879; Kingston, Colony of Jamaica
- Died: 29 December 1963 (aged 84); Hollywood, California, U.S.
- Spouse: Vesey O'Davoren (m. 1916)

Flossie Ivy Louise Verley (married Bradley, later Davoren; 27 July 1879 – 29 December 1963), styled Ivy de Verley, was a Jamaican-born artist active in the United States and United Kingdom.

== Early life ==
Flossie Ivy Louise Verley was born on 27 July 1879 in Kingston in the British Colony of Jamaica to Eliza Jane (née Lazerous) and Louis Francis Verley. She was raised in England and France.

== Career ==
After her first husband died in 1907, De Verley moved to England, where she studied painting and opened the Scarab Studio at Courtfield Gardens in South Kensington, London. She moved to Hollywood, Los Angeles, in 1920 or 1921 and opened a Scarab Studio there as well.

== Artistry ==
De Verley painted living people in a style inspired by death masks. According to de Verley, she developed the style after her husband, Vesey O'Davoren, asked her to create his death mask after he was given little time to live following exposure to poison gas in World War I.

A 1915 review of an exhibit featuring her work described her paintings as "wildly romantic portraits in oil and pastel". Raymond Blathwayt, a journalist, described de Verley's life masks as "striking and at times even weird in the extreme". De Verley's subjects included Elinor Glyn, Betty Blythe, and Casson Ferguson. Her paintings are in the collection of the National Library of New Zealand, and the Witt Library, Courtauld Institute of Art, London.

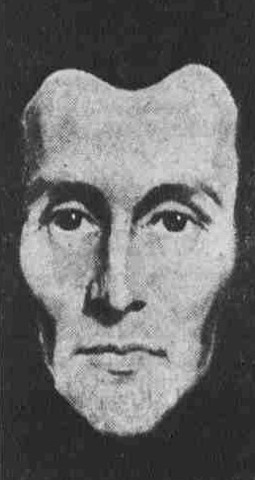
Vesey Davoren, 1920

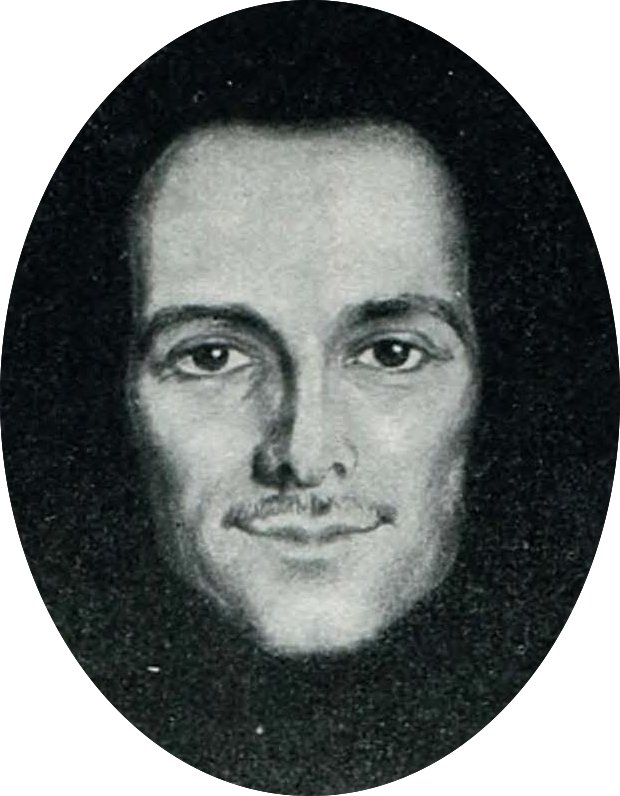
Casson Ferguson, 1923

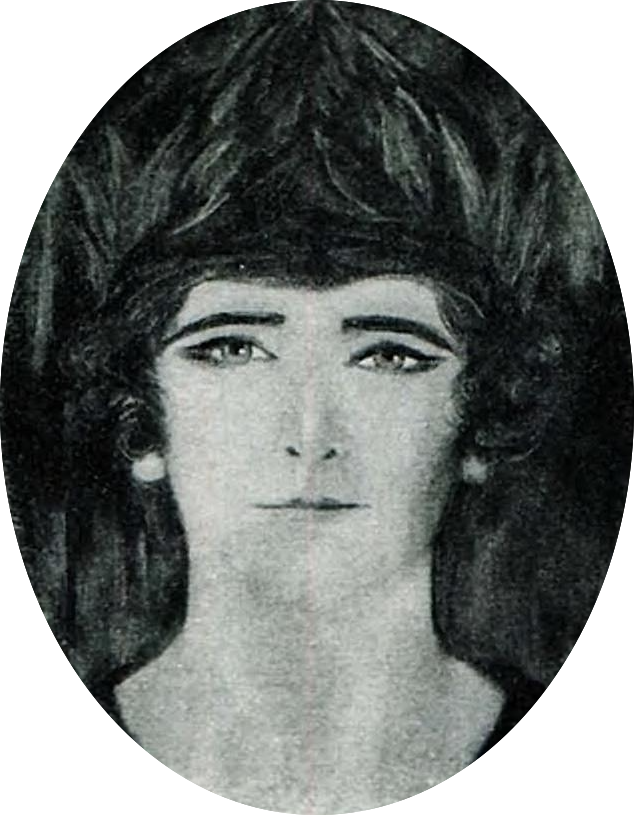
Elinor Glyn, 1923

== Personal life ==
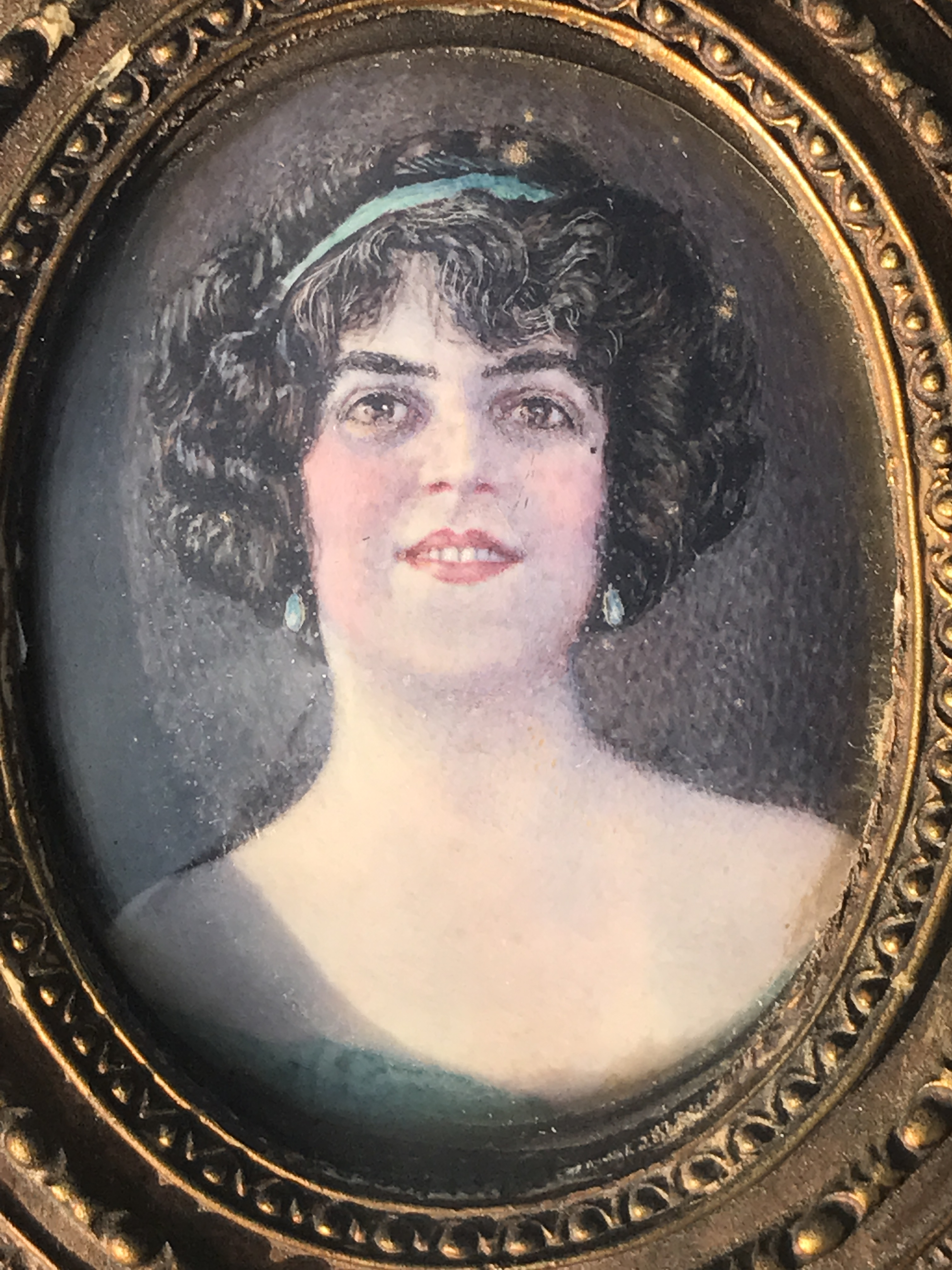
De Verley at the time of her wedding to Davoren, oval miniature by John Morley, 1916.

De Verley married Richard Walter Bradley on 15 November 1905 in Kingston; Bradley died on 14 January in the 1907 Kingston earthquake.

De Verley married Vesey Alfred Davoren on 15 January 1916. As of January 1939, de Verley had lived in Los Angeles, California, for 30 years. She died in Hollywood on 29 December 1963 and her ashes were interred on 31 December at Grand View Memorial Park Cemetery.
