= Vesey O'Davoren =

British soldier and actor (1888–1989)

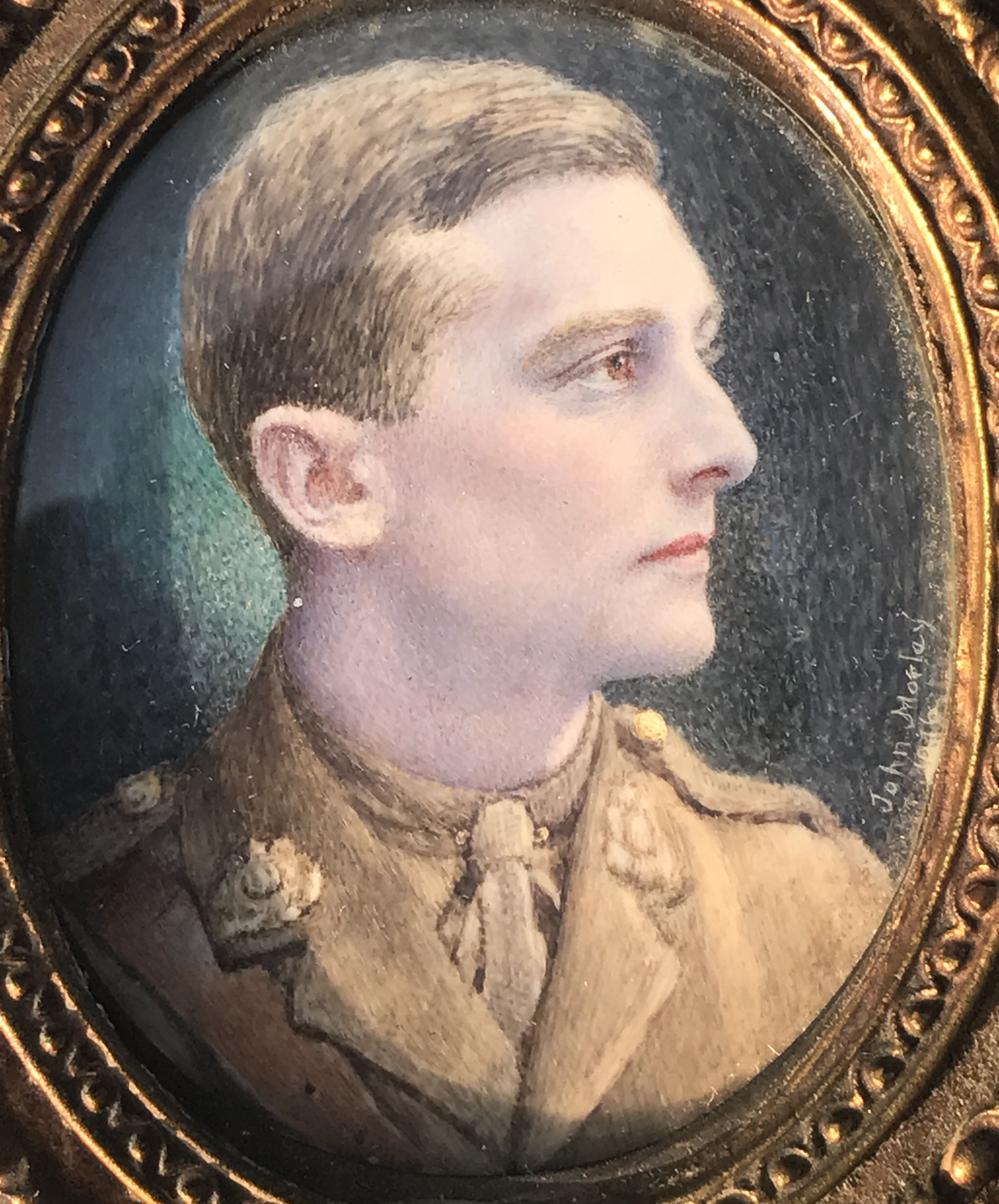
- Davoren in 1916 by John Morley
- Born: Vesey Alfred Davoren; 8 December 1888; Dublin, Ireland
- Died: 30 May 1989 (aged 100); Los Angeles, California, U.S.
- Occupations: Soldier, film actor
- Spouse: Ivy de Verley (m. 1916; died 1963)

Vesey O'Davoren (born Vesey Alfred Davoren; 8 December 1888 – 30 May 1989) was a British soldier who served in the Suffolk Regiment during World War I and later worked as a film and stage actor in California.

== Early life ==
Vesey Alfred Davoren was born to Vesey Henry William and Edith Ann (née Hoyte) Davoren. His father was a major in the Royal Army Medical Corps and was Mayor of Bury St Edmunds 1911–1912. His mother was president of the local branch of the League of Pity. Reportedly, Davoren was a descendent of the Duke of Wellington on his mother's side. He claimed descent from two English Prime Ministers, William Pitt (1708–1778) and "Iron Duke" Arthur Wellesley (1769–1852), and said he stemmed from a family of medieval Irish scholars.

He spent his early childhood in India, later attending St. Paul's school in London and Trinity College in Dublin, Ireland.

As a youth Davoren performed in plays at the Abbey Theatre in Dublin.

== World War I ==
During World War I, Davoren served in the British Army with the 7th Battalion, Suffolk Regiment, under the command of Colonel Charles Douglas Parry Crooke.

In October 1915, his company (B) was massacred in action around the Hohenzollern Redoubt, just after the Battle of Loos. (See Actions of the Hohenzollern Redoubt#British attacks 13–19 October 1915.) An entry in the 7th Battalion, Suffolk Regiment's War Diary on 13 October 1915, states that Davoren "was wounded [shot in foot and then side] in the action on the Hohenzollern Redoubt on 11 October, but continued to lead his Company until killed by a shot from a machine gun". Davoren was rescued, carried for 2 miles (3.2 km), by Sergeant-Major Martin. Davoren was the only one of the 10 officers of B Company, 7th Battalion, Suffolk Regiment, to survive that day, despite having been reported killed.

Following a mustard gas attack, Davoren lost his voice and was told he had six months to live should he live in a dry climate. In order to save his voice, he decided to move to California.

== Career ==
Davoren began his London stage career in 1909.

In February 1920, the New York Herald reported that Davoren, one of "three of the most promising young actors of the British film world" (along with John Gliddon and Elliot Gordon) had set sail from Britain to New York, and he arrived in Hollywood, California later than same year.

He acted in silent films during the seven years it took for his voice to recover from his wartime injury. In 1927, he made his first American film appearance in Arthur Varney's Winds of the Pampas. During this period he also directed plays including a Hollywood Bowl production of The Pied Piper.

By 1930 he had played leading roles in the British and American stage productions of A School for Scandal (as Sir Benjamin Backbite in 1922) and Cyril Harcourt's A Pair of Silk Stockings and along with central roles in musical comedies in Dublin and London.

Davoren's early film and stage career overlapped. In the spring of 1930, he played an elderly man in the play Rope's End while simultaneously playing a younger man in the film So This Is London, saying that he "spent one-half of the day getting my whiskers on and off". His versatility almost cost him the role of Professor Deming in the September 1930 stage production of The Poor Nut when its casting director initially did not believe that the clean-shaven Davoren could be the same actor he remembered from Rope's End.

In June 1934, The Los Angeles Times reported Davoren to be one of four "well-known actors" to be principals in the cast of the stage play The People, Inc.

He went on to have a large number of roles in sound films.

== Personal life ==
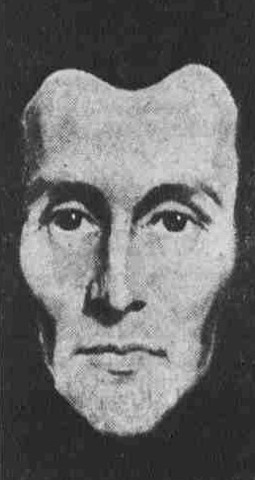
Life mask of Davoren by his wife Ivy de Verley, circa 1920

Davoren married portrait artist Ivy de Verley on 15 January 1916. He modelled for some of his wife's death masks. According to de Verley, she developed the style after her husband asked her to create his death mask after being told he had a short time to live following exposure to poison gas.

In 1922 O'Davoren and his wife commissioned a 2,500 square foot house and studio in West Hollywood, California, in Hollywood's Sunset Strip, near Beverly Boulevard and Sunset Las Palmas Studios, at 2049 North Las Palmas Avenue, Los Angeles, CA 90068. As of 2018, the house still stands.

In 1937 in his backyard, Davoren built several boats, including a 24 foot (7.3 m) cabin cruiser.

He was the founder and commodore of the Topanga Yacht Club, Topanga, California, and was given the honorific sobriquet of "Captain". Despite the prominent involvement of William Randolph Hearst and the purchase of 1,800 acres (730 ha), the planned yacht harbor never materialized.

Davoren died, aged 100, on 30 May 1989 in Los Angeles.

== Filmography ==
He appeared in 64 films between 1927 and 1957, mostly uncredited. Unless otherwise noted, the entries on this list come from the following three sources:

- Winds of the Pampas (1927), starring role as Eusabio
- Springtime for Henry (1934), as a butler
- Female (1933), footman
- Jimmy the Gent (1934), James Cagney's second steward
- British Agent (1934), as secretary, Henderson
- Coming Out Party (1934), as second butler
- The Love Captive (1934), as second butler
- The Girl from 10th Avenue (1935), as servant (scenes deleted)
- The Dark Angel (1935), voice at station (voice, uncredited)
- Folies Bergère de Paris (1935), as man in montage
- Clive of India (1935), as assistant surveyor
- The Right to Live (1935), as waiter
- The Lone Wolf Returns (1935), as Stewart's (Gail Patrick) butler Joseph
- Shipmates Forever (1935), as Converse, Dick Powell's butler
- Ants in the Pantry (1936) as Gawkins the butler with The Three Stooges
- Ladies in Love (1936), as Fritz
- Mr. Deeds Goes to Town (1936), party guest
- The Golden Arrow (1936), as butler
- Dracula's Daughter (1936), as Butler
- Lloyd's of London (1936), as waiter
- The White Angel (1936), as Thompson, butler
- It's All Yours (1937), as Valet
- The Last of Mrs. Cheyney (1937), ship steward
- Let's Get Married (1937) as butler
- London By Night (1937), as Bobby
- Shall We Dance (1937) as steward or ship's bartender
- She Asked for It (1937), as Fletcher
- She Had to Eat (1937), as waiter
- Stella Dallas (1937) as Helen's butler at wedding
- Wife, Doctor and Nurse (1937), as butler
- Four Men and a Prayer (1938), Vincent, a flunky
- The Lady Objects (1938), as Langham
- Violent is the Word for Curly (1938) as Professor Hicks in a Three Stooges short
- Lord Jeff (1938) as Queen Mary steward
- Hound of the Baskervilles (1939), as ship's steward
- Raffles (1939), as David Niven's butler
- The Little Princess (1939) starring Shirley Temple in her first Technicolor film, as an orderly
- My Son, My Son! (1940), as the butler
- Dark Delusion (1947), as butler
- Forever Amber (1947), as Fop
- If Winter Comes (1947), as Tybar, butler
- The Late George Apley (1947), as minister
- Blondie's Reward (1948), as Dickson or Dickson's butler
- The Emperor Waltz (1948), as butler
- I Love Trouble (1948), Lilly, as butler
- A Connecticut Yankee in King Arthur's Court (1949), as castle servant
- Rogues of Sherwood Forest (1950)
- The Milkman (1950), as Carter's butler
- Please Believe Me (1950), as ship's maitre d'hotel
- Kind Lady (1951), as pedestrian
- The Son of Dr. Jekyll (1951) as Sir John Utterson's (Lester Matthews's), butler
- Million Dollar Mermaid (1952)
- All the Brothers Were Valiant (1953), as the minister
- Let's Do It Again (1953), as Gary's butler
- Brigadoon (1954), as townsman
- The King's Thief (1955), as courier
- The Scarlet Coat (1955), as butler
- Diane (1956), as valet
- Telephone Time (TV series), (1956), the episode: "She Also Ran" (1956), as president's aide
- Until They Sail (1957), as the minister/reverend in Delia's wedding
