= Winds of the Pampas =

1927 film

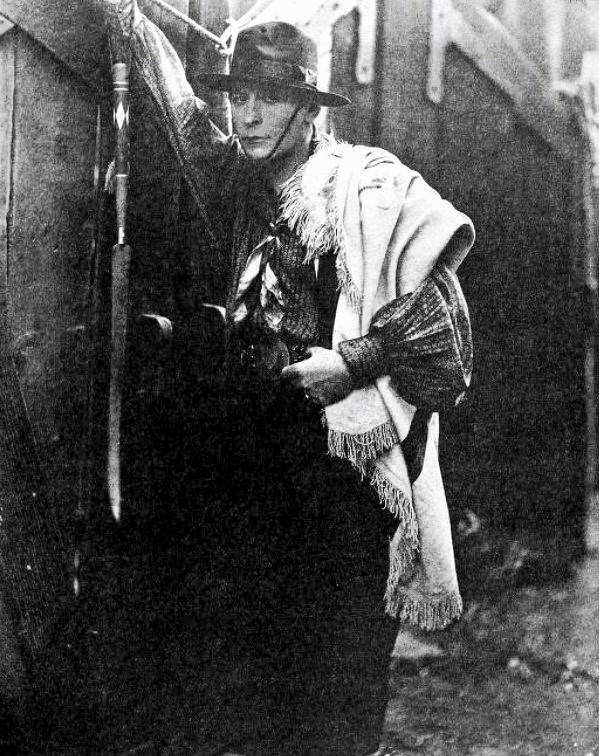
- Still with Cloninger
- Directed by: Arthur Varney
- Written by: Elynor Ewing; Arthur Varney
- Starring: Ralph Cloninger; Harry Holden; Vesey O'Davoren
- Cinematography: David W. Gobbett
- Edited by: Arthur Varney
- Production company: Cloninger Productions
- Distributed by: Hi-Mark Productions
- Release date: October 1927
- Running time: 6 reels
- Country: United States
- Language: Silent (English intertitles)

Winds of the Pampas is a 1927 American silent drama film directed by Arthur Varney and starring Ralph Cloninger, Harry Holden, and Vesey O'Davoren.

== Cast ==
- Ralph Cloninger as Don Rafael Casandos
- Harry Holden as Don José Casandos
- Vesey O'Davoren as Eusabio
- Edwards Davis as Don Escamillo Casandos
- Claire McDowell as Doña Maria Casandos
- Anne Drew as Mariquita
- Lucille McMurrin as Mercedes
- Vicente Padula as Emilio

== Bibliography ==
- Goble, Alan. The Complete Index to Literary Sources in Film. Walter de Gruyter, 1999.
