= Ralph Cloninger =

American actor (1888–1962)

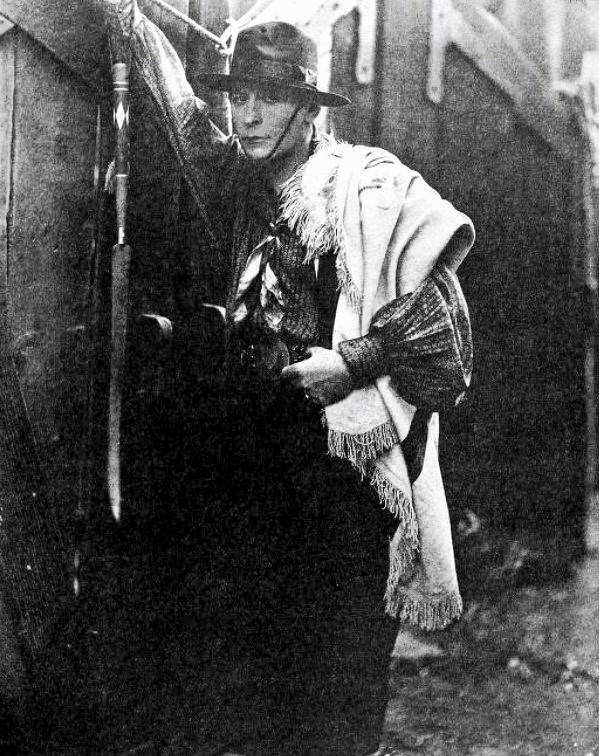
- Still from Winds of the Pampas (1927)
- Born: April 20, 1888; Texas, U.S.
- Died: June 17, 1962 (aged 74); Los Angeles, California, U.S.
- Occupation: Actor
- Known for: Monte Cristo (1922); Hearts Aflame (1923); Winds of the Pampas (1927)

Ralph Cloninger (1888–1962) was an American actor.

He was born April 20, 1888, in Texas. He died June 17, 1962, in Los Angeles, California.

He was known for his film performances in Monte Cristo (1922), Hearts Aflame (1923), and as a leading star in Winds of the Pampas (1927).

Venues where he performed in person included the Beaver Opera House in Beaver, Utah.

He was the leading man in the Wilkes players' performance of Common Clay, in Salt Lake City in 1917.
