= Bertie Verley =

Jamaican cricketer

Personal information
- Born: 28 December 1873; Kingston, Jamaica
- Died: 14 January 1907 (aged 33); Kingston, Jamaica
- Role: Bowler
- Source: Cricinfo, 5 November 2020

Bertie Verley (28 December 1873 – 14 January 1907) was a Jamaican solicitor and sportsman.

Verley was born in Kingston, Jamaica. He attended York Castle High School in Jamaica and Lynn Grammar School in England, before going on to Christ's College, Cambridge. He graduated Bachelor of Arts in 1893 and returned to Jamaica where he practised as a solicitor.

Verley played in five first-class matches for the Jamaican cricket team from 1894 to 1897. His obituary in the Wisden Cricketers' Almanack described him as a "useful bowler" who played against R. S. Lucas' XI in 1895 and A. A. Priestley's XI in 1897. He also captained the Jamaican polo team on a tour of Trinidad in 1905.

Verley was killed in the 1907 Kingston earthquake. He was buried at Half Way Tree.

== See also ==
- List of Jamaican representative cricketers
