= Orange Bay (Portland Parish) =

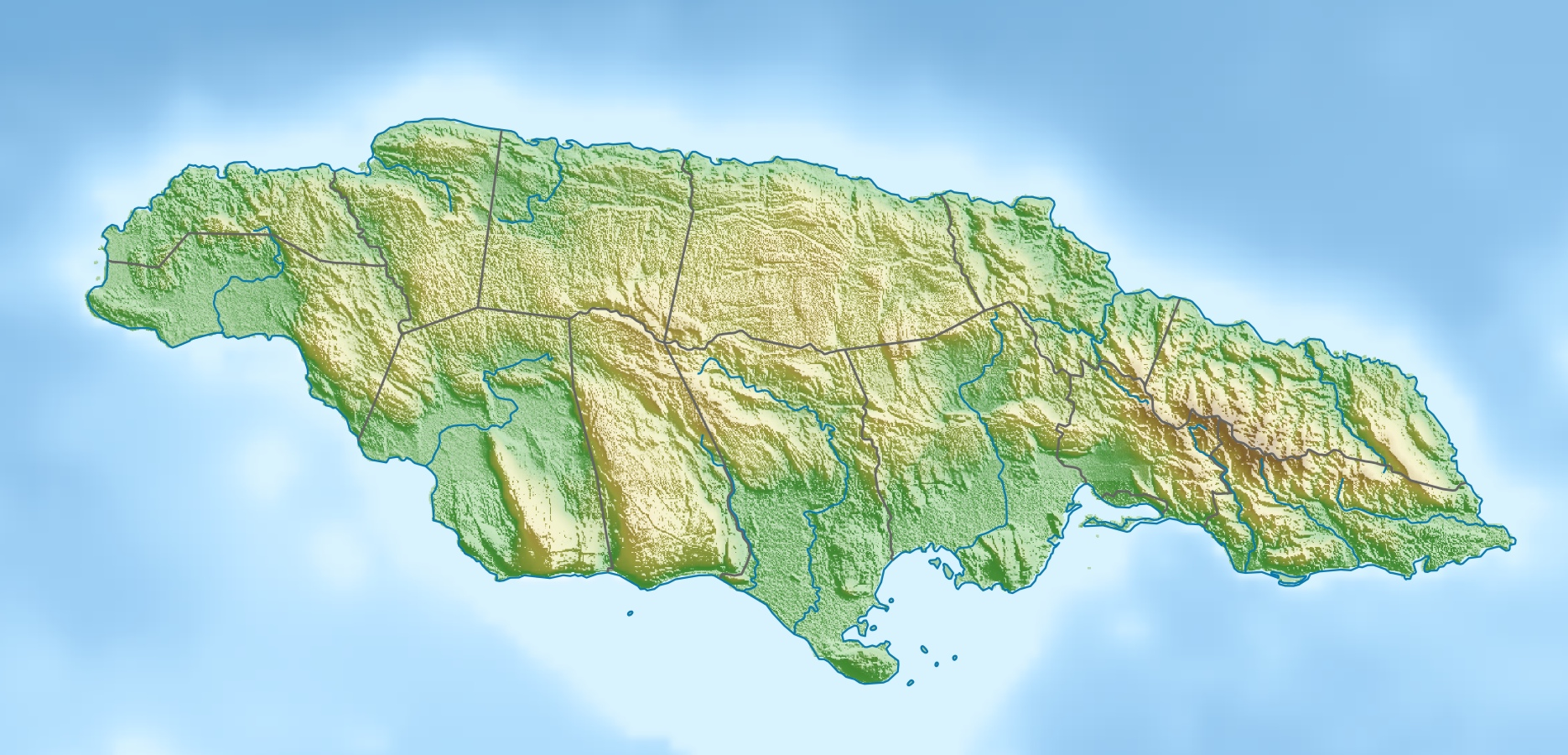
- Location in Jamaica
- Location: Portland Parish, Jamaica
- Coordinates: 18.2267018°N 76.6111422°W

Orange Bay is a small bay in Portland Parish, Jamaica, fifteen miles west of the capital, Port Antonio. The name is shared by a small village on the shore of the bay.
