= 1907 Kingston earthquake =

Earthquake in Jamaica

1907 Jamaica earthquake
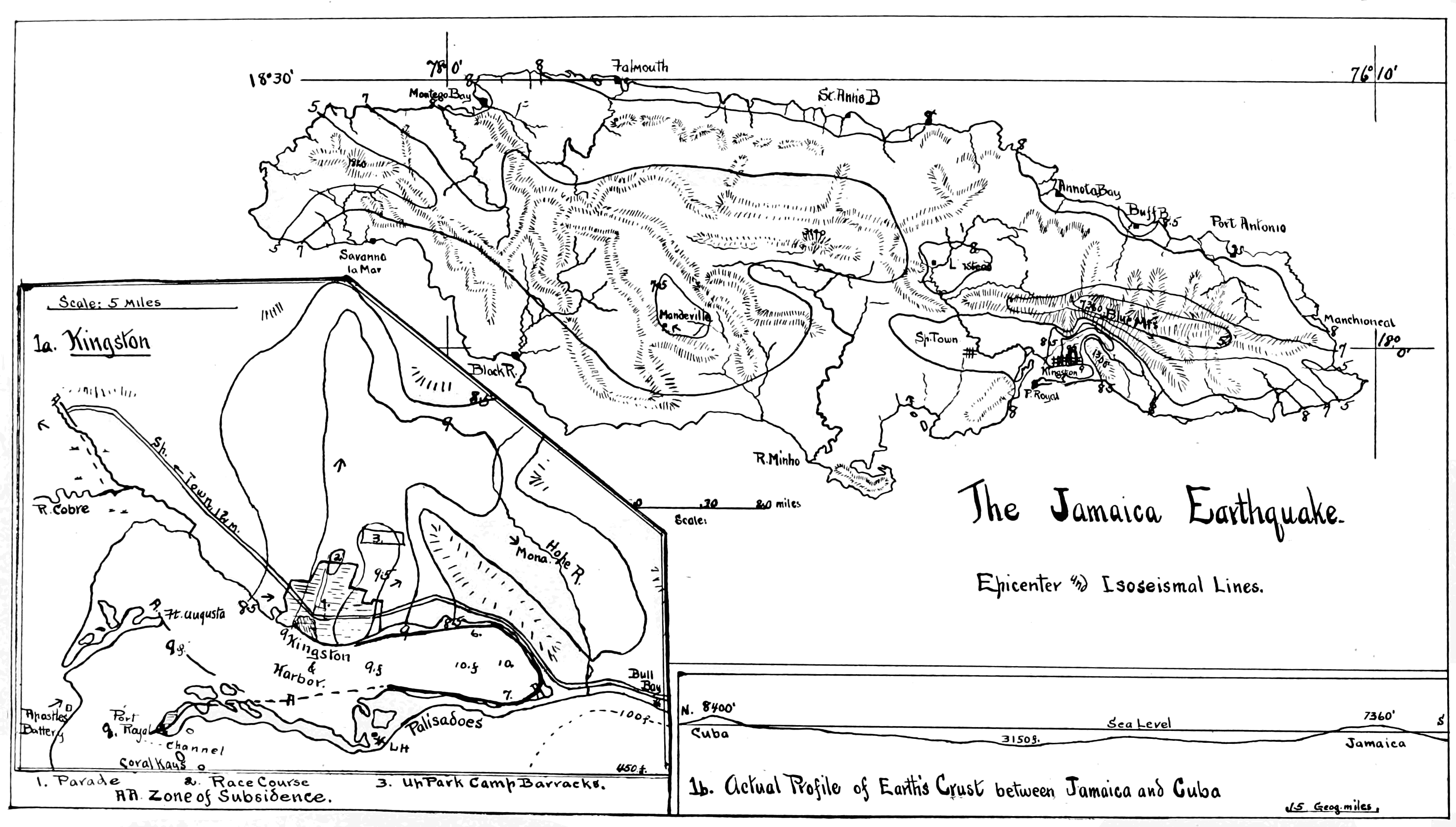

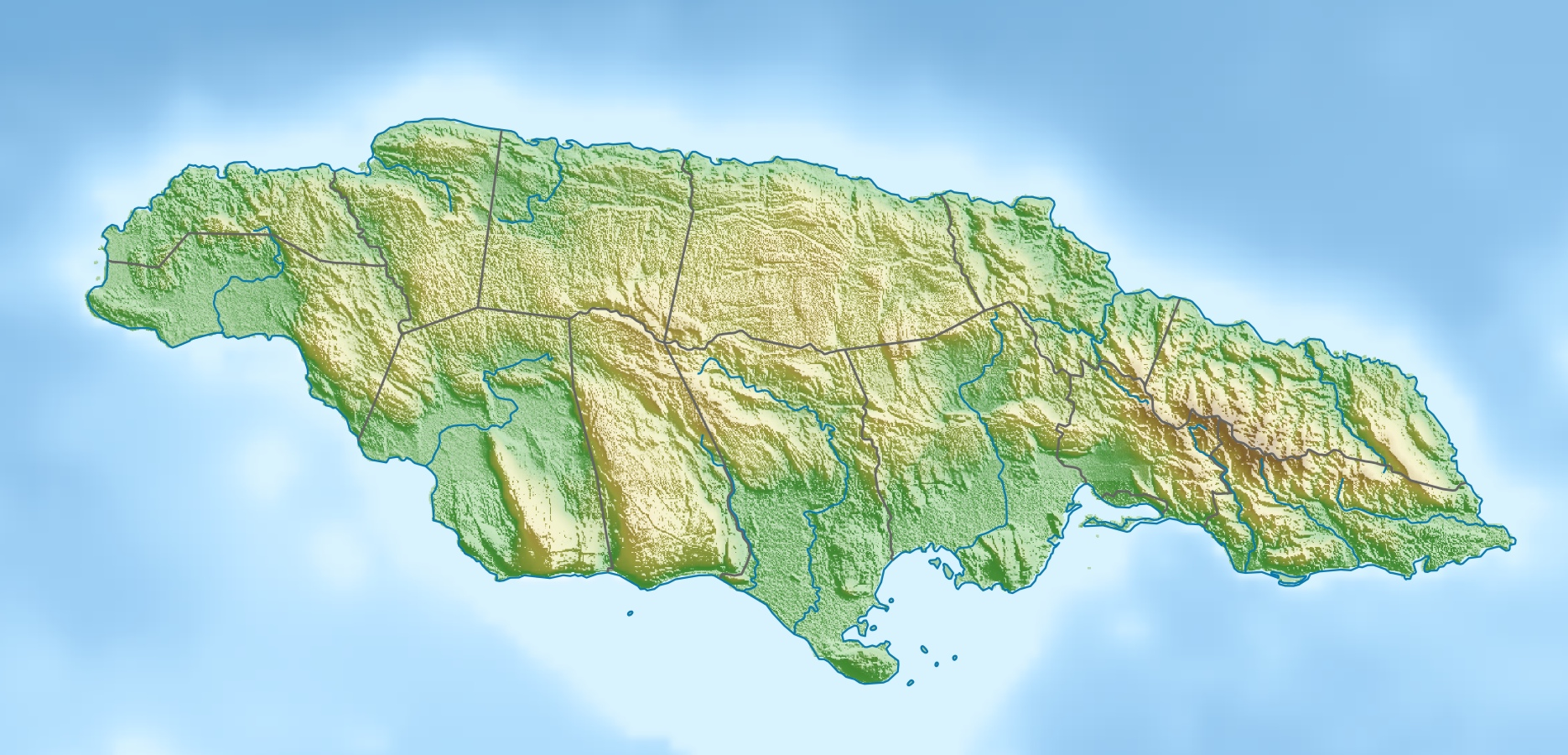
- Location within Jamaica
- UTC time: 1907-01-14 20:36:00
- ISC event: 610326322
- USGS-ANSS: ComCat
- Local date: 14 January 1907
- Local time: 15:30
- Magnitude: M_{w} 6.2
- Epicenter: 18.2°N 76.7°W
- Areas affected: Jamaica
- Tsunami: yes
- Casualties: ~1,000

The 1907 Kingston earthquake which shook the capital of the island of Jamaica with a magnitude of 6.2 on the moment magnitude scale on Monday 14 January, at about 3:30 p.m. local time (20:36 UTC), is described by the United States Geological Survey as one of the world's deadliest earthquakes recorded in history. Every building in Kingston was damaged by the earthquake and subsequent fires, which lasted for three hours before any efforts could be made to check them, culminating in the death of about 1,000 people, and causing approximately $30 million in material damage ($1036.61 million in 2025). Shortly after, a tsunami was reported on the north coast of Jamaica, with a maximum wave height of about 2 m (6–8 ft).

== Tectonic setting ==
Jamaica lies within a complex zone of faulting that forms the boundary between the Gonâve microplate and the Caribbean plate. To the east of the island the main fault is the Enriquillo–Plantain Garden fault zone while to the west the main structure is the Walton fault zone, both major sinistral (left lateral) strike-slip faults. The transfer of plate boundary displacement between these major fault zones takes place on a series of NW–SE trending faults, such as the Wagwater Belt. The overall tectonic setting is one of transpression at this restraining bend in the plate boundary.

== Damage ==
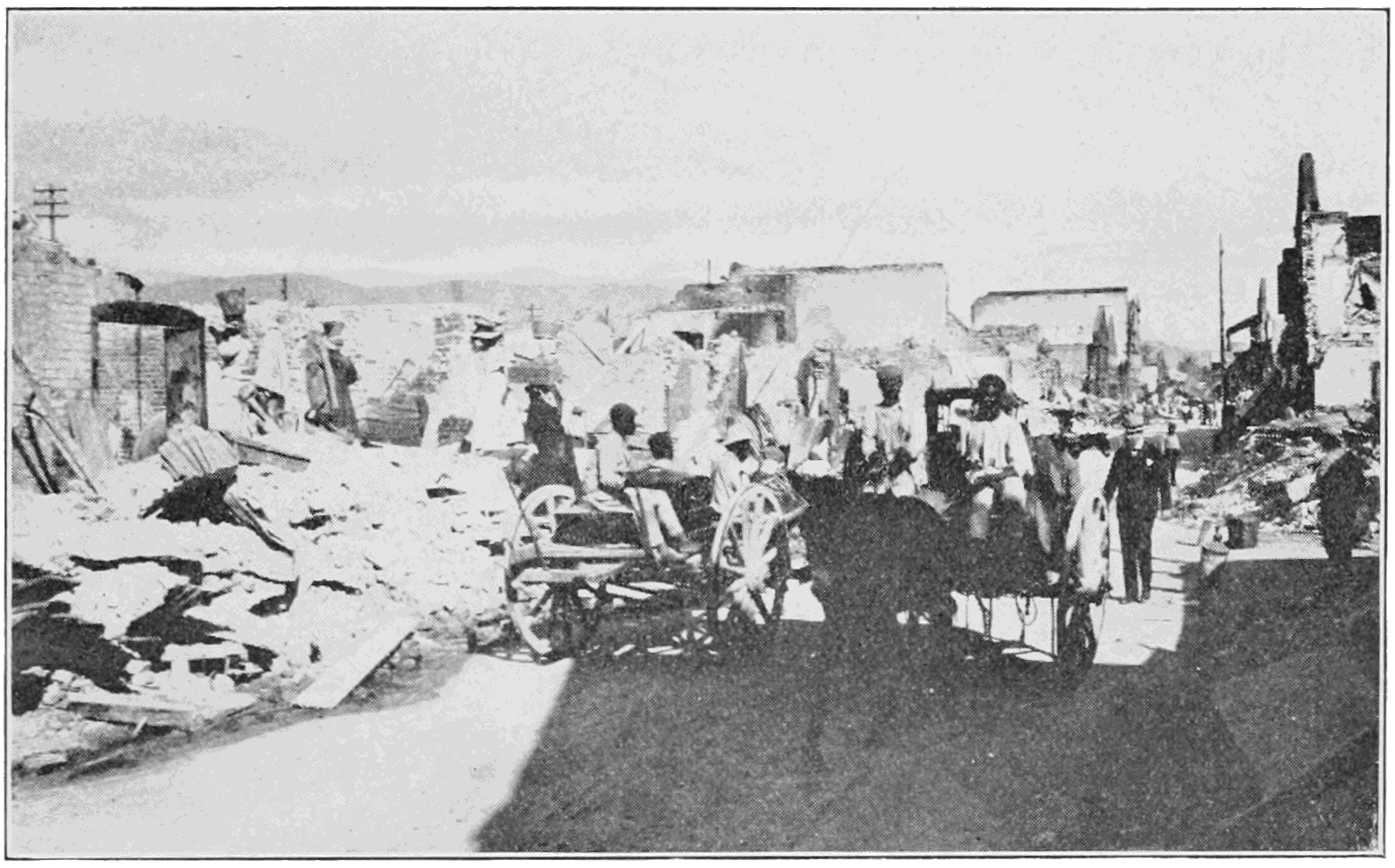
The narrow harbour street of the burned district

The greatest damage occurred at Kingston and at Buff Bay and Annotto Bay on the northern coast. Eighty-five percent of buildings in Kingston were destroyed by the shaking, which was followed by a fire that destroyed parts of the business and warehouse districts. The Elder-Dempster passenger steamer Port Kingston, which was under repair in Kingston Harbour at the time, was threatened by fire on the nearby wharf. A rapid temporary repair allowed her to be moved to the safety of an unaffected railway wharf. A suspension bridge was destroyed at Port Maria.

== Characteristics ==
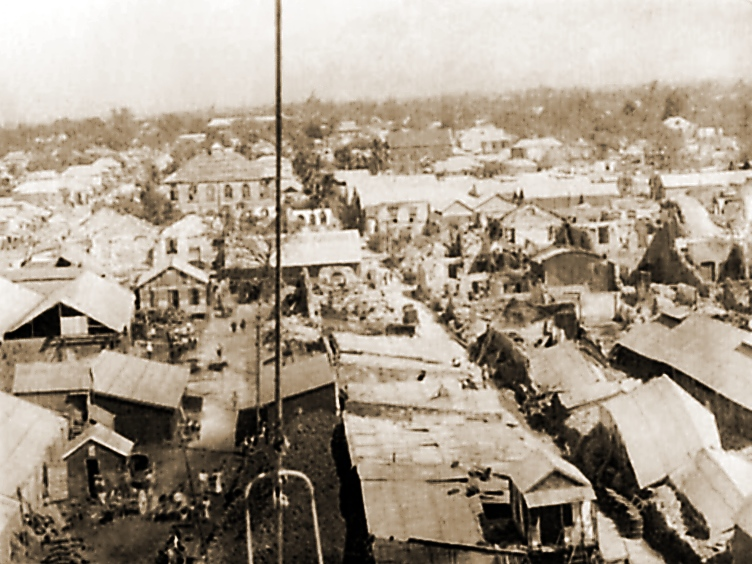
View of Kingston in 1907 showing damage caused by the earthquake.

=== Earthquake ===
The main shock lasted for about 35 seconds after some minor initial tremors and was accompanied by a roaring sound. The intensity of the shaking grew quickly to a first and strongest climax. The intensity then lessened before again reaching a second weaker climax. There were eighty aftershocks recorded up to 5 February, while the strongest of all was recorded on 23 February.

The epicenter of the earthquake is not well constrained. The only seismograph in Jamaica at the time was put out of action by the earthquake. The rupture may have been on an eastward continuation of the South Coast Fault Zone, within the Wagwater Belt or in the Blue Mountains. The greatest felt intensity was noted for areas built on unconsolidated sands and gravels. To the east of Kingston, along the Palisadoes, there were sandblows and surface faulting associated with areas of subsidence and flooding.

=== Tsunami ===
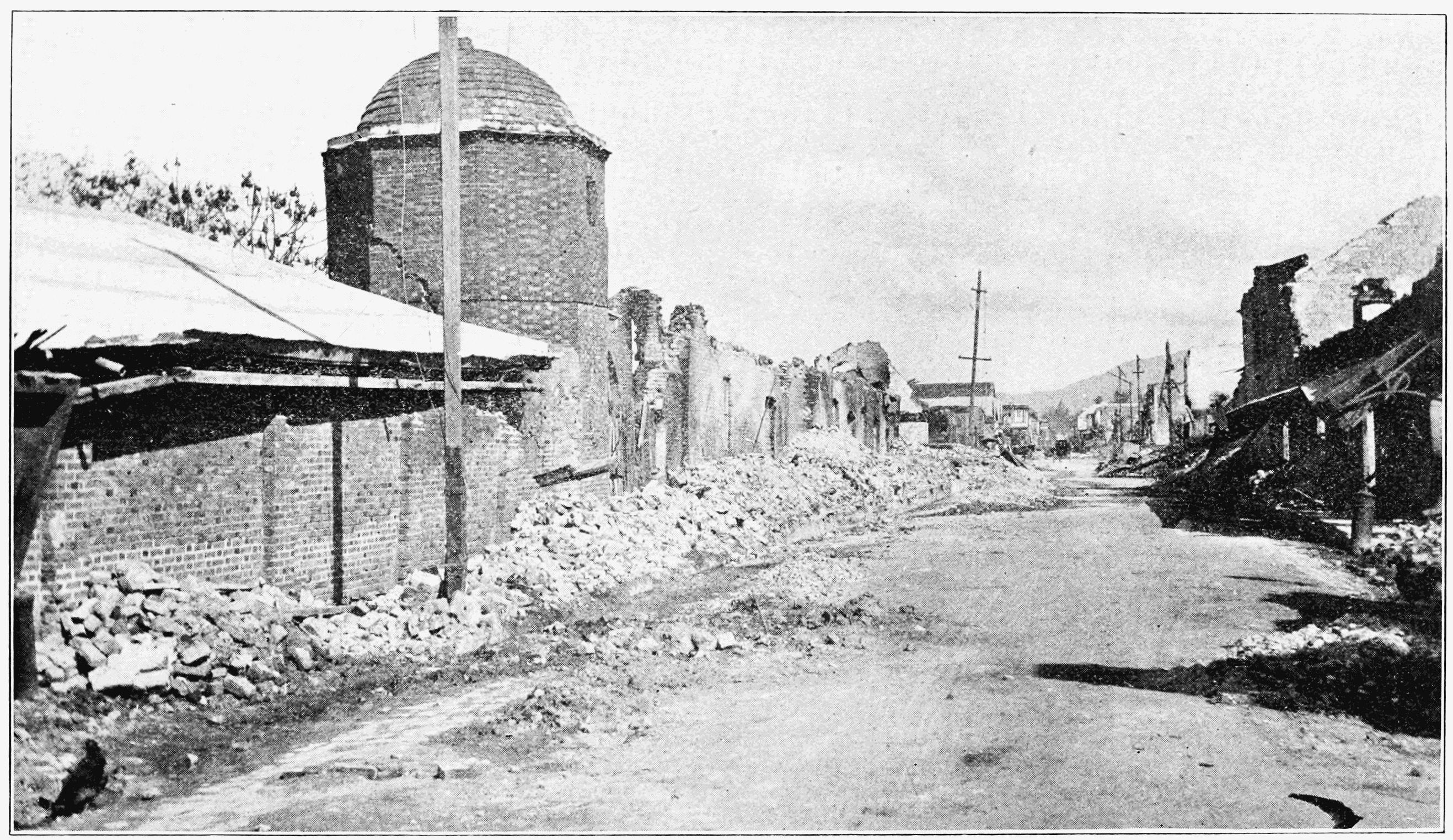
Northward view of the street in the business section

After the earthquake, tsunami were observed along much of the north coast of Jamaica at Hope Bay, Port Antonio, Orange Bay, Sheerness Bay, Saint Ann's Bay, Buff Bay, Port Maria and Annotto Bay; there were also some reports of waves along the south coast. Seiches were reported in Kingston Harbour. The level of the sea at Annotto Bay was reported to have initially dropped by more than 3 metres (9.8 ft), as the sea withdrew a distance of about 80 m (260 ft), before returning at a height of about 2 metres (6 ft 7 in) above normal, flooding the lower parts of the town.

== Aftermath ==
The Port Kingston, the only passenger ship in Kingston Harbour, was used as a makeshift hospital, with improvised operating theatres in three parts of the ship and on the adjoining wharf. Kingston Public Hospital, despite loss of its water supply, continued to function throughout the following night. Three United States Navy warships, the battleships USS Indiana and USS Missouri and the destroyer USS Whipple, landed men and supplies on 17 January, although an offer of eight surgeons was rejected by Governor of Jamaica Alexander Swettenham.

== Notable victims ==
- Sir James Fergusson, 6th Baronet, British politician and colonial governor
- Bertie Verley, Jamaican cricket player

== See also ==
- List of earthquakes in 1907
- List of earthquakes in the Caribbean
