= Crista (disambiguation) =

Crista is an internal compartment formed by the inner membrane of a mitochondrion.

Crista may also refer to:

- Crista (given name)
- Crista Ministries, a collection of Christian ministries in Shoreline, Washington

In anatomy:

- Crista ampullaris, a sensory organ of the internal ear
- Crista dividens, a structure in the developing heart of the human embryo
- Crista frontalis, the frontal crest, a structure of the skull
- Crista galli, a structure of the ethmoid bone
- Crista interfenestralis, an anatomical feature that separates the inner ear in two found in some reptiles
- Crista occipitalis interna, the internal occipital crest, a structure in the skull
- Crista terminalis, a crest structure in the heart

In species:

- Gyraulus crista, a minute species of freshwater snail
- Ptilium crista-castrensis, a moss species

== See also ==
- Crest (disambiguation)
- Christa (disambiguation)
- Crist (surname)
- Cristi
- Cristy
- Krista, a female given name
- Crista-galli (disambiguation)
