= Cristo =

Cristo is a given name and a surname. Notable people with the name include:

- Cristo Foufas, British radio presenter
- Giovanni Di Cristo (born 1986), Italian judoka
- Julio Sánchez Cristo (born 1959), Colombian radio personality
- Inri Cristo, (born 1948), a Brazilian self-proclaimed Messiah

== See also ==
- Christo (name)
  - Christo (1935–2020), artist who wrapped public places in fabric
- Crist (surname)
- Crista (disambiguation)
- Cristi
- Cristy
- El Cristo (disambiguation)
- Kristo (disambiguation)
- Monte Cristo (disambiguation)
