= Crista-galli =

Crista-galli or crista-gallii, hen crest in Latin, may refer to:

- Erythrina crista-galli, a flowering tree species native to Argentina, Uruguay, Brazil and Paraguay
- Cynosurus crista-galli, a grass species in the genus Cynosurus
- Nephrophyllidium crista-galli, a plant species
- Polylepis crista-galli, a plant species endemic to Bolivia
- Tillandsia crista-galli, a plant species endemic to Mexico

== See also ==
- Crista (disambiguation)
- Crista galli
- Galli
