= Monte Cristo =

Monte Cristo or Montecristo may refer to:

== Places ==
- Montecristo, an Italian island in the Tuscan Archipelago
- Montecristo, Bolívar, Colombia
- Montecristo de Guerrero, a town in Mexico
- Monte Cristo Homestead, a historic property in Junee, New South Wales
- Monte Cristo, a town in Río Primero Department, Argentina

=== United States ===
- Monte Cristo, Sierra County, California, a former settlement and gold mine
- Monte Cristo Mountains, a mountain range in Nye County, Nevada
- Monte Cristo Range (Nevada), a mountain range in Nevada
- Monte Cristo Range (Utah), a mountain range in Utah
- Monte Cristo, Washington, a ghost town in Washington State
- Monte Cristo Peak, a mountain peak in Washington State
- Monte Cristo Cottage, Eugene O'Neill's summer home in Connecticut
- Monte Cristo Gold Mine, a mine in Los Angeles County, California
- Monte Cristo Hotel, a historic building in Everett, Washington

== People and characters ==
- Marisela de Montecristo (born 1992), a Salvadoran-American model, actress, television presenter, and beauty pageant titleholder
- Christopher "MonteCristo" Mykkles, League of Legends analyst and executive

=== Fictional characters ===
- Count of Monte-Cristo, a fictional character created by Alexander Dumas for the eponymous 1845 novel The Count of Monte Cristo, the pseudonym of the protagonist Edmond Dantès

== Film, television and theatre ==
- Monte Cristo Jr. (Victorian burlesque), a Victorian burlesque with a libretto by Richard Henry, composed by Meyer Lutz, Ivan Caryll, Hamilton Clarke, et al. (premiered 1886)
- Monte Cristo Jr. (musical), a musical composed by Sigmund Romberg and Jean Schwartz, with a book and lyrics by Harold Atteridge (premiered 1919)
- Monte Cristo (1922 film), starring John Gilbert
- Monte Cristo (1929 film), starring Jean Angelo
- Montecristo (Argentine TV series), a 2006 Argentine telenovela loosely based on the Alexandre Dumas novel
- Montecristo (2006 Mexican TV series), a 2006 telenovela
- Miss Monte-Cristo, 2021 South Korean revenge drama
- Montecristo (2023 TV series), a Mexican streaming television miniseries
- The Count of Monte Cristo (2024 film), starring Pierre Niney
- Monte Cristo (musical), a 2026 musical with music by Stephen Weiner and lyrics and book by Peter Kellogg

== Ships ==
- Montecristo, a pirated cargo ship whose crew in 2011 used a message in a bottle to help NATO ships proceed with rescue
- Monte Cristo (barque), the former name of Canadian three masted auxiliary barque Endeavour II
- Monte Cristo (sternwheeler), a steamboat completed in 1891

== Other uses ==
- Monte Cristo (company), a defunct video game developer
- Monte Cristo sandwich, a grilled or fried sandwich
- Montecristo (cigar), a brand of premium cigar

== See also ==
- Monte (disambiguation)
- Cristo (disambiguation)
- Monte Cristi (disambiguation)
- The Count of Monte Cristo (disambiguation)
- The Countess of Monte Cristo (disambiguation)
- The Return of Monte Cristo (disambiguation)
