= The Count of Monte Cristo (disambiguation) =

The Count of Monte Cristo is a novel by Alexandre Dumas.

The Count of Monte Cristo may also refer to:

== Films ==
- The Count of Monte Cristo, a 1908 silent film starring Hobart Bosworth
- The Count of Monte Cristo (1913 film), a silent film starring James O'Neill
- The Count of Monte Cristo (1918 series), a silent-film serial starring Léon Mathot
- Monte Cristo (1922 film), a silent film starring John Gilbert
- Monte Cristo (1929 film) (aka The Count of Monte-Cristo in the US), a French silent film starring Jean Angelo
- The Count of Monte Cristo (1934 film), starring Robert Donat
- The Count of Monte Cristo (1942 film) (Spanish: El Conde de Montecristo), starring Arturo de Córdova
- The Count of Monte Cristo (1943 film), starring Pierre Richard-Willm
- The Count of Monte Cristo (1953 film) (Spanish: El Conde de Montecristo), starring by Jorge Mistral
- The Count of Monte Cristo (1954 film), starring Jean Marais
- The Count of Monte Cristo (DuPont Show of the Month), a 1958 made-for-tv adaptation
- The Count of Monte Cristo (1961 film), starring Louis Jourdan
- The Count of Monte Cristo, a 1997 animated, direct-to-video film produced by Blye Migicovsky Productions and Phoenix Animation Studios
- The Count of Monte Cristo (2002 film), starring Jim Caviezel
- The Count of Monte Cristo (2024 film), a French film starring Pierre Niney

== Television ==
- The Count of Monte Cristo (1956 TV series), starring George Dolenz
- The Count of Monte Cristo (1958 film), a television film starring Hurd Hatfield on the DuPont Show of the Month
- The Count of Monte Cristo (1964 TV series), starring Alan Badel
- The Count of Monte Cristo, a 1973 animated television TV movie produced by Hanna-Barbera Productions
- The Count of Monte Cristo (1975 film), a TV film starring Richard Chamberlain
- The Count of Monte-Cristo, a 1991 animated television film produced by Burbank Animation Studios
- The Count of Monte Cristo (1998 miniseries), starring Gérard Depardieu
- Gankutsuou: The Count of Monte Cristo, a 2004–2005 anime television series
- The Count of Monte Cristo (2024 TV series), a French-Italian television series

== Other uses ==
- Edmond Dantès, the titular character of the Alexander Dumas novel The Count of Monte Cristo and its adaptations
- The Count of Monte Cristo (Wildhorn musical), a 2009 musical based on the novel, with music by Frank Wildhorn
- The Count of Monte Cristo (James Behr musical), a 2010 off-Broadway musical based on the novel
- The Count of Monte Cristo (radio program), an old-time radio program based on the novel

== See also ==
- "The Count of Monte Christo", a Noisettes song from the album What's the Time Mr Wolf
- Le Comte de Monte-Cristo (1979 TV series), starring Jacques Weber
- Monte Cristo (disambiguation)
- The Countess of Monte Cristo (disambiguation)
- The Return of Monte Cristo (disambiguation)
