= Crista (given name) =

Crista may refer to:

- Crista Arangala, American mathematician
- Crista Cullen (born 1985), an English field hockey player
- Crista Dahl (born 1934), Canadian artist
- Crista Flanagan (born 1976), an American television and stand-up comedian
- Crista Moore (born 1968), American actress
- Crista Nicole (born 1978), an American model and actress
- Crista Samaras, American inventor
