= Cristi =

Cristi is a given name and surname. Notable people with the name include:

== With the given name ==
- Cristi Chirică (born 1997), Romanian rugby union player
- Cristi Conaway (born 1965), American actress and fashion designer
- Cristi Harris (born 1977), American actress
- Cristi Ilie Pîrghie (born 1992), Romanian rower
- Cristi Minculescu (born 1959), Romanian pop singer
- Cristi Puiu (born 1967), Romanian film director and screenwriter

== With the surname ==
- Elvira Cristi (born 1976), Chilean actress and model
- Jorge Muñoz Cristi (1898–1967), Chilean geologist
- Oscar Cristi (1916–1965), Chilean politician
- Vladimir Cristi (1880–1956), Romanian politician

== See also ==
- Crist (surname)
- Crista (disambiguation)
- Cristo (disambiguation)
- Cristie (born 1978), Spanish flamenco singer
- Cristy, name
- Kristi (disambiguation)
- Monte Cristi (disambiguation)
