= The Countess of Monte Cristo =

The Countess of Monte Cristo may refer to:

- The Countess of Monte Cristo (French: La Comtesse de Monte-Cristo), an 1869 novel attributed to Alexandre Dumas, but actually written by Jean Charles Du Boys, which served as a sequel to Dumas' 1846 novel The Count of Monte Cristo
- The Countess of Monte Cristo (1932 film), a German film starring Brigitte Helm
- The Countess of Monte Cristo (1934 film), an American film starring Fay Wray
- The Countess of Monte Cristo (1948 film), an American film starring Sonja Henie
- The Countess of Monte Cristo, a forthcoming French TV series

== See also ==
- Monte Cristo (disambiguation)
- The Count of Monte Cristo (disambiguation)
- The Return of Monte Cristo (disambiguation)
