= El Cristo =

El Cristo may refer to:

- El Cristo, Chiriquí, Panama
- El Cristo, Coclé, Panama
- El Cristo (Santiago de Cuba), Cuba

== See also ==
- Cristo (disambiguation)
