= The Count of Monte Cristo =

1846 novel by Alexandre Dumas

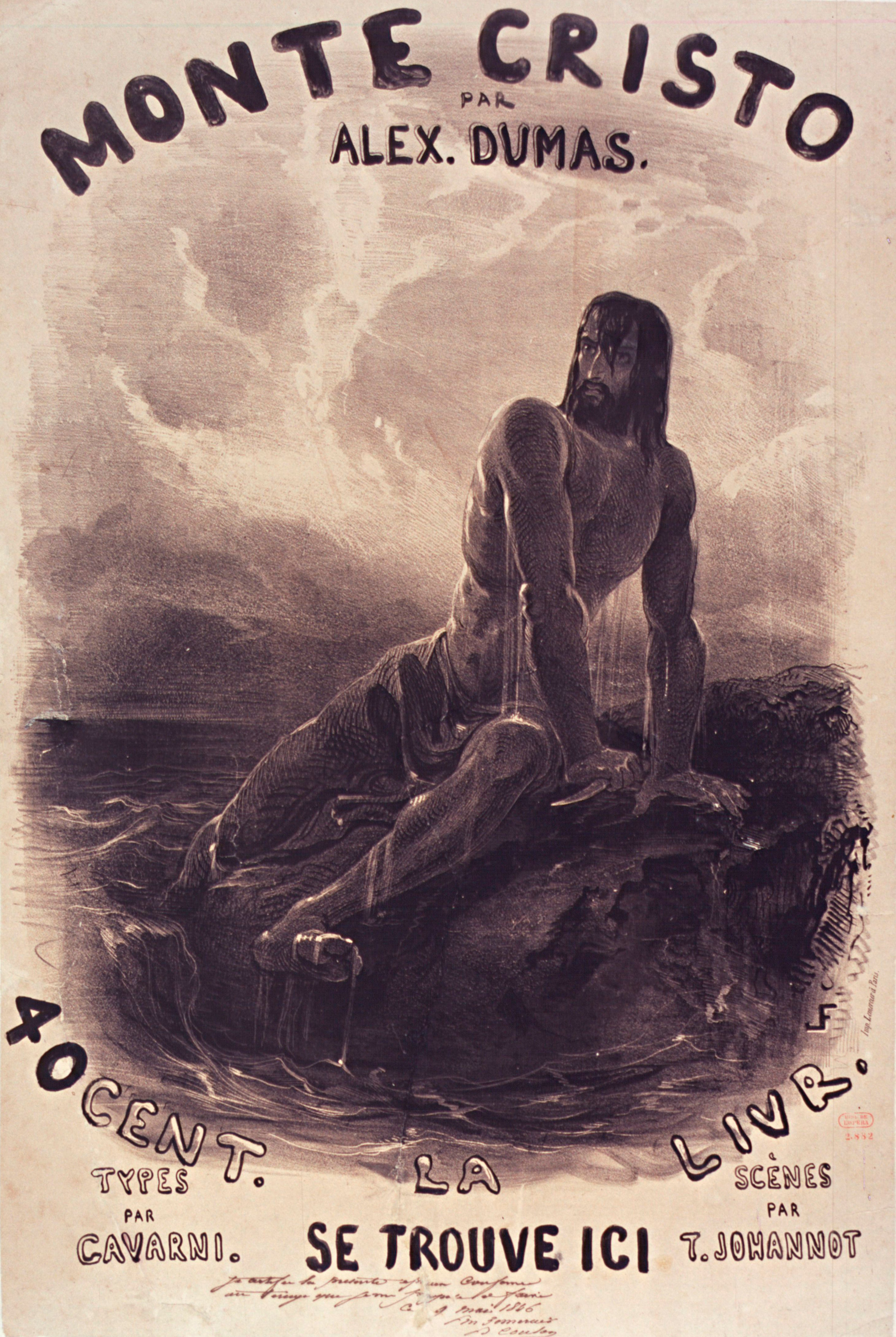
- Author: Alexandre Dumas in collaboration with Auguste Maquet
- Original title: Le Comte de Monte-Cristo
- Translator: Chapman and Hall
- Illustrator: Pierre-Gustave Staal
- Cover artist: François-Louis Français
- Language: French
- Genre: Historical novel Adventure
- Set in: Napoleonic France; Kingdom of France; Papal States; Monte Cristo
- Published in: Journal des Débats
- Publisher: Pétion
- Publication date: 28 August 1844–15 January 1846 (Serial); 1846 (Book)
- Publication place: France
- Media type: Print (serial)
- OCLC: 457320004
- Dewey Decimal: 843.7
- Original text: Le Comte de Monte-Cristo at French Wikisource
- Translation: The Count of Monte Cristo at Wikisource

The Count of Monte Cristo (French: Le Comte de Monte-Cristo) is an adventure novel by the French writer Alexandre Dumas. It was serialised from 1844 to 1846, then published in book form in 1846. It is one of his most popular works, along with The Three Musketeers (1844) and Man in the Iron Mask (1850). Like many of his novels, it was expanded from plot outlines suggested by his collaborating ghostwriter, Auguste Maquet. It is regarded as a classic of French and world literature.

The novel is set in France, Italy, and islands in the Mediterranean Sea during the historical events of 1815–1839, the era of the Bourbon Restoration through the reign of Louis Philippe I. It begins on the day when Napoleon left his first island of exile, Elba, beginning the Hundred Days period of his return to power. The historical setting is fundamental to the narrative. The Count of Monte Cristo explores themes of hope, justice, vengeance, mercy and forgiveness.

It follows the life of Edmond Dantès, a young sailor who is falsely accused of treason, and imprisoned in the prison Château d’If. There, he meets Abbé Faria, who educates him and reveals the location of a hidden treasure on the island of Monte Cristo. After escaping, Dantès recovers the treasure and transforms himself into a wealthy and enigmatic nobleman.

Under the identity of the titular Count of Monte Cristo, he enters high society in Paris and begins a calculated plan of revenge against those who betrayed him, including Danglars, his former ship's supercargo; Fernand, the cousin and suitor of his fiancée; and Villefort, the crown prosecutor who ensures his imprisonment to protect his own career. In the end, he abandons complete devotion to revenge, seeks redemption, and departs with his former slave and lover Haydée, leaving others to confront the consequences of both their actions and his.

The Count of Monte Cristo achieved widespread popularity upon its serialized publication in 1844, attracting large audiences across Europe who followed its installments with sustained interest and discussion. Contemporary accounts describe it as one of the most widely read works of its time. Its popularity has endured and is today viewed as a classic, with the novel remaining continuously in print and adapted into many films and television series. The work has also inspired later literature across genres, including historical fiction, science fiction, and modern retellings, and continues to be regarded as a significant and widely influential novel.

== Plot ==
=== Marseille and Château d'If ===
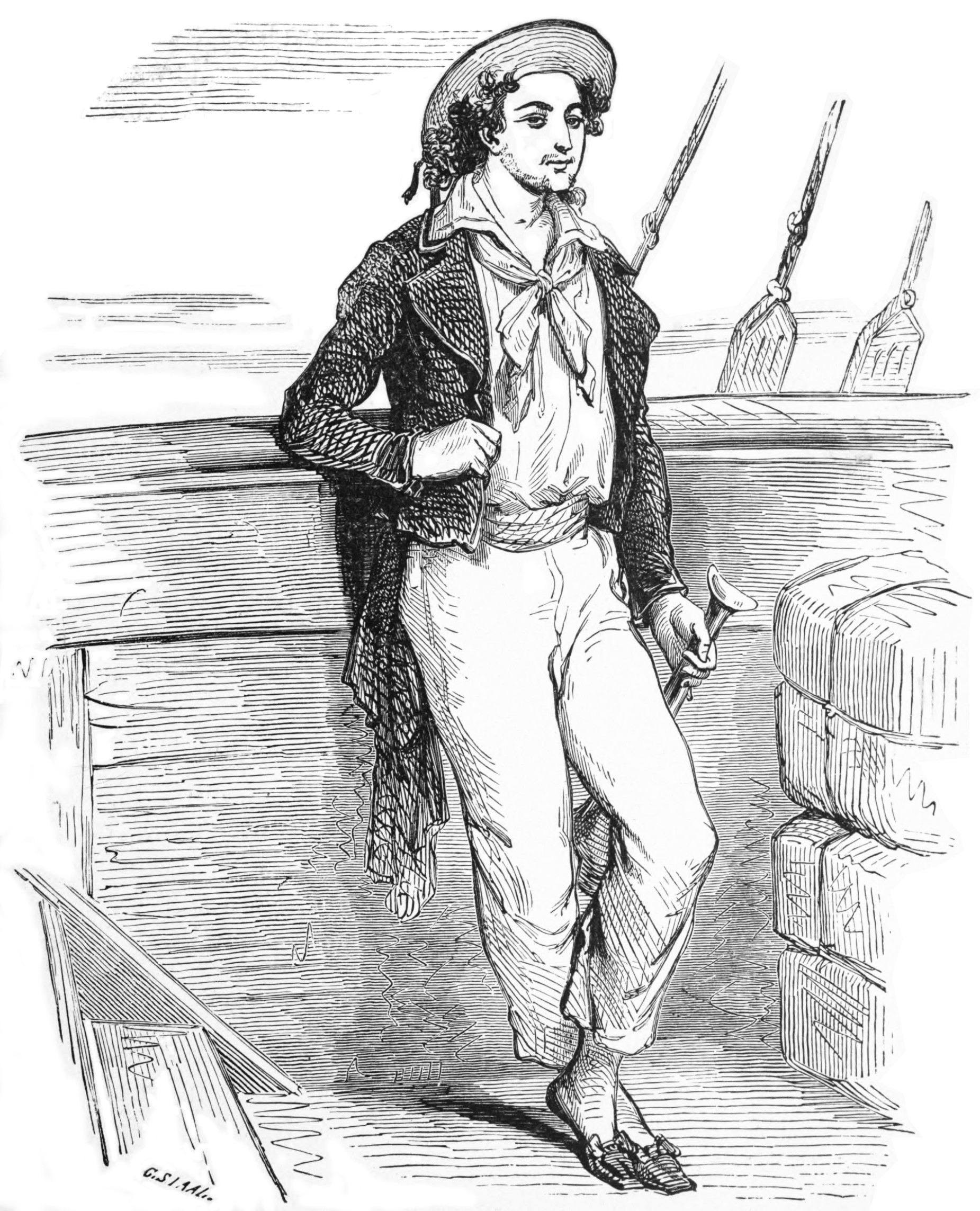
The protagonist, Edmond Dantès, was a merchant sailor before his imprisonment. (Illustration by Pierre-Gustave Staal)

Shortly before Napoleon's escape from his exile on Elba in 1815, Edmond Dantès, the young first mate of the merchant ship Pharaon, honours his dying captain's last wish: to retrieve a letter from Elba, to be conveyed to the Bonapartist Noirtier in Paris. When the Pharaon arrives in the port of Marseille, the ship's owner, Morrel, decides to promote Dantès to captain, provoking the distaste and jealousy of the supercargo, Danglars. Morrel, a Bonapartist sympathizer himself, provides Dantès with two weeks' furlough to marry his Catalan fiancée Mercédès Herrera and deliver the letter.

Mercédès' cousin, Fernand Mondego, is jealous of Dantès, desiring to marry Mercédès himself. He and Danglars meet to plan Dantès' downfall: they draft an anonymous letter denouncing Dantès as a Bonapartist. Dantès' neighbour Gaspard Caderousse, who also resents Dantès' success, objects to the plan, but is unable to prevent them from sending the letter to the crown prosecutor. Dantès' and Mercédès' engagement party is interrupted by Dantès' arrest; the cowardly Caderousse, despite knowing the charges are false, does not speak up.

Dantès is brought before the deputy crown prosecutor, Gérard de Villefort. Villefort is Noirtier's son, and knows that his political career would be ruined if it were known that his father is a Bonapartist. Therefore he destroys the letter and, despite believing Dantès to be innocent, silences him by sentencing him without trial to life imprisonment in the notorious Château d'If.

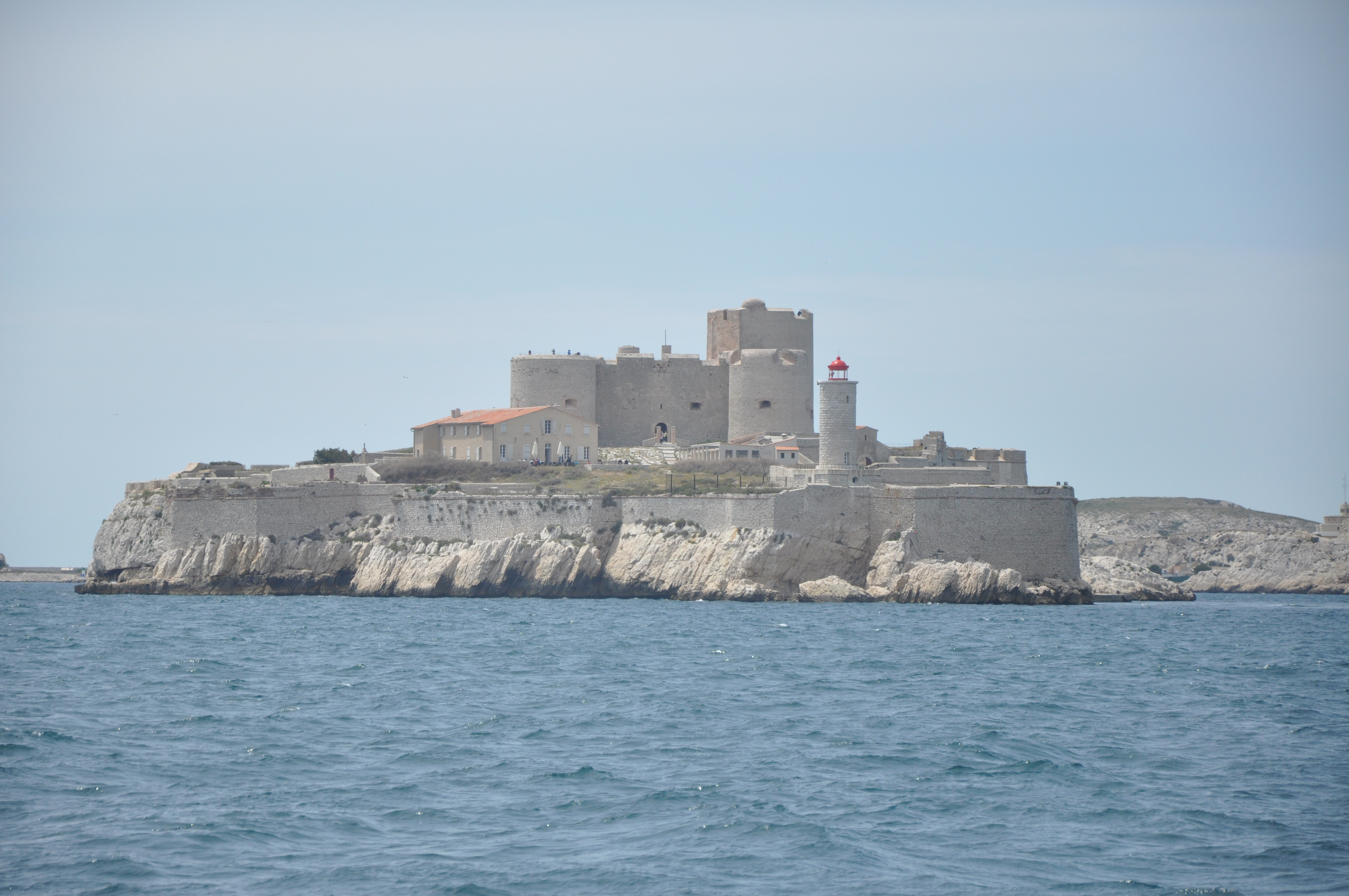
Château d'If (Marseille)

After six years of imprisonment Dantès is on the verge of suicide. However, another prisoner, the scholarly Italian priest Abbé Faria, digs an escape tunnel that mistakenly ends in Dantès' cell. The Abbé helps Dantès deduce the culprits of his imprisonment. Over the next eight years, Faria educates Dantès in languages, history, culture, mathematics, medicine, and science. Knowing himself to be close to death from catalepsy, Faria tells Dantès the location of a vast treasure hidden by his former employer on the island of Monte Cristo. When Faria dies, Dantès takes Faria's place in the burial sack, which the guards throw into the sea.

=== Transformed identity and preparation ===
Dantès cuts through the sack and swims to a nearby island, where, claiming to be a shipwrecked sailor, he is rescued by Genoese smugglers. Months later, he locates and retrieves the treasure; he later purchases the island of Monte Cristo and the title of count from the Tuscan government.

Having sworn vengeance on Danglars, Fernand, and Villefort, Dantès returns to Marseille in search of information to accomplish his goal. Travelling as the Abbé Busoni, Dantès finds Caderousse, who regrets not intervening in Dantès' arrest. Caderousse informs him that Mercédès eventually resigned herself to marrying Fernand. He recounts that Dantès' father died of starvation, and that Morrel tried unsuccessfully to secure Dantès' release and save his father, but now Morrel is on the brink of bankruptcy. Both Danglars and Fernand have prospered greatly. Danglars became a speculator, amassed a fortune, married a wealthy widow, and became a baron. Fernand served in the French Army, rising to the rank of lieutenant-colonel. Dantès rewards Caderousse with a diamond, but he does not disclose his real identity. Later, Caderousse negotiates the sale of the diamond to a jeweller, but he kills the jeweller to keep the diamond and the money. He is eventually arrested and sentenced to the galleys.

To rescue Morrel from bankruptcy, Dantès poses as a banker, buys Morrel's debts, and gives him three months' reprieve. At the end of the three months, Morrel is about to commit suicide, but learns that the debts have been mysteriously paid and that one of his lost ships has returned with a full cargo; it was secretly rebuilt and laden by Dantès.

=== Revenge ===
Dantès reappears in 1838 as the mysterious, fabulously wealthy Count of Monte Cristo. Fernand is now the Count de Morcerf, Danglars is a baron and banker, and Villefort is a royal prosecutor.

In Rome, at Carnival time, Dantès befriends Viscount Albert de Morcerf, the son of Mercédès and Fernand. He arranges for Albert to be captured by the bandit Luigi Vampa (an ally of Dantès), and "rescues" the boy, earning his trust. Albert introduces the Count to Parisian high society. In his guise as the Count, Dantès meets Mercédès for the first time in 23 years and eventually makes the acquaintance of Danglars, Fernand and Villefort.

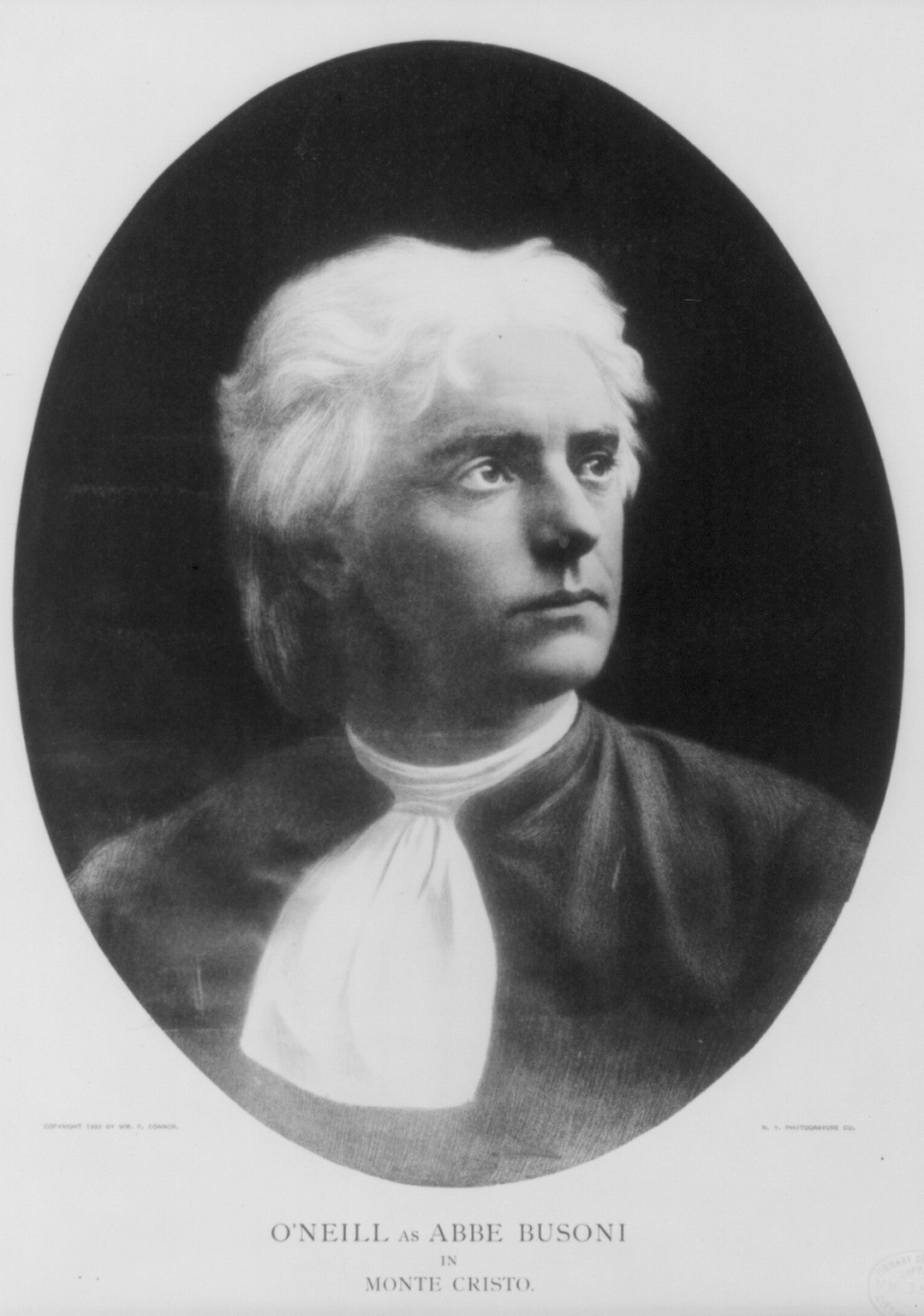
Actor James O'Neill as the Abbé Busoni

The Count purchases a home in Auteuil, a suburb of Paris. He has learnt from his servant Bertuccio that it is the home in which Villefort once had an extramarital affair with Danglars's wife, who gave birth to a child that Villefort buried alive in order to cover up the affair. The infant was rescued by Bertuccio, named Benedetto, and raised by Bertuccio's sister Assunta, but Benedetto turned to a life of crime as a young man, murdered Assunta, and was sentenced to the galleys.

Having impressed Parisian society with his wealth and air of mystery, the Count sets up the pieces for his revenge. He persuades Danglars to extend him a credit of six million francs. He discusses the properties of various poisons with Villefort's second wife Héloïse and allows her to borrow some of his supply. He allows his ward, Haydée—the exiled daughter of Ali Pasha of Janina, whom Dantès purchased from slavery—to see Fernand, recognising him as the man who betrayed and murdered her father and stole his fortune. Under the alias Lord Wilmore, Dantès frees Benedetto and Caderousse from the galleys; then he anonymously hires Benedetto to impersonate an Italian nobleman, Viscount Andrea Cavalcanti, and introduces him to Parisian society. Dantès manipulates the financial markets by bribing a telegraph operator to transmit a false message, causing Danglars to lose hundreds of thousands of francs.

Meanwhile, Villefort's daughter Valentine is engaged to marry Albert's friend Franz, but she is secretly in love with Morrel's son Maximilien. Noirtier, her grandfather, induces Franz to break the engagement by revealing that Noirtier himself killed Franz's father in a duel. Benedetto ingratiates himself to Danglars, who betroths his daughter Eugénie to him after canceling her engagement to Albert. Caderousse blackmails Benedetto, threatening to reveal his past if he does not share his newfound wealth. Héloïse begins poisoning members of Villefort's family, intending to ensure that all of the family's wealth will be inherited by her son Édouard, rather than her stepdaughter Valentine. However, Noirtier secretly doses Valentine with a drug that will give her limited resistance to the poison.

Caderousse attempts to rob the Count's house but is caught by "Abbé Busoni" and forced to write a letter to Danglars, exposing "Cavalcanti" as an impostor. When Caderousse leaves the estate, he is stabbed by Benedetto. Caderousse dictates a deathbed statement naming his killer, and the Count reveals his true identity to Caderousse before he dies.

The Count anonymously leaks to the newspapers Fernand's betrayal of Ali Pasha. At the Chamber of Peers' inquiry into the accusations, Haydée testifies against him as an eyewitness. Albert blames the Count for his father's downfall and challenges him to a duel. The Count is later visited by Mercédès, who recognized him as Dantès upon their first meeting but chose not to say anything. Mercédès begs Dantès to spare her son. He tells her of the injustices inflicted on him, but he agrees not to kill Albert. Realizing that Dantès intends to let Albert kill him, she reveals the truth to Albert, who makes a public apology to the Count. Albert and Mercédès disown Fernand, renounce their titles and wealth, and depart to begin new lives. Albert enlists as a soldier, while Mercédès lives alone in Dantès' old house in Marseilles. Fernand confronts the Count of Monte Cristo, who reveals his identity. Fernand shoots himself.

At the party to celebrate "Cavalcanti"'s engagement to Eugénie Danglars, the police arrive to arrest Benedetto for Caderousse's murder. Benedetto flees, but he is arrested and returned to Paris. Eugénie (who is implied to be a lesbian) flees Paris with her girlfriend.

Valentine barely survives Héloïse's first attempt to poison her, and Maximilien begs the Count to protect her from the unknown poisoner. He does so by faking her death, making it appear that the poisoner succeeded. Villefort deduces that Héloïse is the murderer, and before leaving to prosecute Benedetto's trial, he gives her a choice between the shame of a public trial or committing suicide in private. At the trial, Benedetto reveals that he is Villefort's son and was rescued after Villefort buried him alive, having learned the truth from Bertuccio. Villefort admits his guilt and rushes home to prevent his wife's suicide, but he is too late; she is dead and has poisoned her son Édouard as well. The Count confronts Villefort, revealing his true identity, which drives Villefort insane. Dantès tries but fails to resuscitate Édouard, causing him to question if his revenge has gone too far.

As a result of the Count's financial manipulations, Danglars is left with a ruined reputation and 5,000,000 francs he has been holding in deposit for hospitals. The Count demands this sum to fulfill their credit agreement, and Danglars embezzles the hospital fund. He flees to Italy with the Count's receipt for the cash and 50,000 francs of his own, and he is reimbursed the 5,000,000 francs from the Count's own bank account. While leaving Rome, he is kidnapped by Luigi Vampa. The bandits extort Danglars' ill-gotten gains from him by forcing him to pay exorbitant prices for food and water. Dantès anonymously returns the money to the hospitals. Danglars finally repents of his crimes, and a softened Dantès forgives him and allows him to depart with his 50,000 francs.

=== Resolution and return to the Orient ===
Maximilien Morrel is driven to despair by Valentine's apparent death and considers suicide. Dantès reveals his true identity and persuades Maximilien to delay his suicide for one month. One month later, on the island of Monte Cristo, he reunites Valentine with Maximilien and reveals the true sequence of events. Having found peace, Dantès leaves the couple part of his fortune on the island and departs for the East to begin a new life with Haydée, who has declared her love for him. The reader is left with a final line: "l'humaine sagesse était tout entière dans ces deux mots: attendre et espérer!" ("all human wisdom is contained in these two words: 'Wait and Hope'").

Character relationships in The Count of Monte Cristo

== Characters ==
=== Edmond Dantès and his aliases ===
- Edmond Dantès (born 1796): A sailor with a promising future (loosely based on real life Pierre Picaud), he becomes engaged to Mercédès (1815). After his transformation into the Count of Monte Cristo (1830s), he reveals his true name only to his enemies as each revenge is completed and to Mercédès (who was the only character to immediately recognise him as Edmond). To everyone else, Edmond Dantès is thought of as dead, falling to his demise in the waters surrounding the Château d'If.
- The Count of Monte Cristo: The identity Dantès assumes when he emerges from prison and acquires his vast fortune. As a result, the Count of Monte Cristo is usually associated with a coldness and bitterness that come from an existence based solely on revenge. This character thinks of Lord Wilmore as a rival.
- Chief Clerk of the banking firm Thomson & French, an Englishman.
- Lord Wilmore: An Englishman, and the persona in which Dantès performs random acts of generosity.
- Sinbad the Sailor: The persona that Dantès assumes when he saves the Morrel family and while conducting business with smugglers and brigands.
- Abbé Busoni: The persona of an Italian priest with religious authority.
- Monsieur Zaccone: Dantès, in the guise of the Abbé Busoni, and again as Lord Wilmore, tells an investigator that this is the Count of Monte Cristo's true name.
- Number 34: The name given to him by the new governor of Château d'If. Finding it too tedious to learn Dantès' real name, he was called by the number of his cell.
- The Maltese Sailor: The name he was known by after his rescue by smugglers from the island of Tiboulen.

=== Allies of Dantès ===
- Abbé Faria: Italian priest, sage and former secretary to Cardinal Spada, imprisoned in the Château d'If (1815). Edmond's dearest friend, and his mentor and teacher while in prison. On his deathbed, he reveals to Edmond the secret treasure hidden on Monte Cristo. Partially based on the historical Abbé Faria.
- Giovanni Bertuccio: The Count of Monte Cristo's steward and loyal servant. The Count first meets him in his role as Abbé Busoni, the confessor to Bertuccio, whose past is tied with M. de Villefort. Bertuccio's sister-in-law Assunta was the adoptive mother of Benedetto.
- Luigi Vampa: Celebrated Italian bandit and fugitive.
- Peppino: Formerly a shepherd, becomes a member of Vampa's gang. The Count arranges for his public execution in Rome to be commuted, causing him to be loyal to the Count.
- Ali: Monte Cristo's mute Nubian slave.
- Baptistin: Monte Cristo's valet-de-chambre.
- Jacopo: A poor smuggler who helps Dantès survive after he escapes prison. When Jacopo proves his loyalty, Dantès rewards him with his own ship and crew. (Jacopo Manfredi is a separate character, the "bankrupt of Trieste", whose financial failure contributes to the depletion of Danglars's fortune.)
- Haydée (or Haidee): Monte Cristo's young, beautiful slave. She is the daughter of Ali Tebelen and was sold into slavery by Morcerf after her father was killed. Buying her is part of Dantès' plan to get revenge on Fernand. At the novel's end, she and Monte Cristo leave together, presumably to eventually marry.

=== Morcerf family ===
- Mercédès Mondego (née Herrera): A Catalan girl engaged to Edmond Dantès (1815). She later marries her cousin Fernand, and they have a son, Albert. She is consumed with guilt over Edmond's disappearance and is able to recognize him when they meet again (1830s). In the end, she returns to Marseilles, living in a house provided by the Count, praying for Albert. She is portrayed as a compassionate, kind and caring woman who thinks of her loved ones more than herself.
- Fernand Mondego (later known as Count de Morcerf): cousin of Mercédès; Edmond's rival for her affection. Initially a Catalan fisherman in a Spanish village near Marseilles (1815), Fernand helps Danglars ruin Edmond by sending the denunciation in a desperate but successful attempt to separate him from Mercédès. He marries her, achieves the rank of general in the French army, and purchases a peerage in the Chambre des Paris, keeping secret his betrayal of the Pasha Alì Tebelen and the selling into slavery of his daughter Haydée and her mother Vasiliki. He shows a deep affection and care for his wife and son. He meets his end through suicide (late 1830s), in the despair of having lost Mercédès and Albert, who disown him when they discover his hidden crimes.
- Albert de Morcerf: Son of Mercédès and Fernand. He is described as a kind-hearted, joyful and carefree young man (1830s), and is fond of Monte Cristo, whom he sees as a friend. After acknowledging the truth of his father's war crimes and the false accusation towards the sailor Edmond Dantès, Albert leaves his home with Mercédès. He starts a new life as a soldier under the name "Herrera" (his mother's maiden name) and travels to Africa in search of fortune and honor.

=== Danglars family ===
- Baron Danglars: Dantès' jealous junior officer and mastermind behind his imprisonment (1815), writing the letter of denunciation which Fernand mails. He later becomes a wealthy banker (1830s), but is ultimately ruined as part of the Count of Monte Cristo's revenge when Luigi Vampa's bandits rob him of the 5,000,000 francs he had stolen, leaving him with only 50,000 francs.
- Madame Hermine Danglars (formerly Baroness Hermine de Nargonne née de Servieux): Once a widow, she had an affair with Gérard de Villefort, a married man. They had an illegitimate son, Benedetto.
- Eugénie Danglars: Daughter of Baron Danglars and Hermine Danglars. She is free-spirited and aspires to become an independent artist, running away from home with her close friend (and implied lover) Louise d'Armilly, following her collapsed engagement to Andrea Cavalcanti (later revealed to be Benedetto) (late 1830s).

=== Villefort family ===
- Gérard de Villefort: The royal prosecutor who imprisons Dantès to protect his career (1815). He goes insane after his crimes are exposed (1830s).
- Renée de Villefort (née de Saint-Méran): Gérard de Villefort's first wife, mother of Valentine.
- The Marquis and Marquise de Saint-Méran: Renée's parents.
- Valentine de Villefort: The daughter of Gérard de Villefort and his first wife, Renée. She is 19 years old with chestnut hair, dark blue eyes, and "long white hands" (1830s). Though she is engaged to Baron Franz d'Épinay, she is in love with Maximilien Morrel. As part of Gérard de Villefort's punishment, the Count of Monte Cristo appears to poison her, but at the end of the book it is revealed that Valentine is still alive and she is reunited with Maximilien.
- Monsieur Noirtier de Villefort: The father of Gérard de Villefort and grandfather of Valentine and Édouard. A committed anti-royalist, it is his plot to restore Napoleon in which Dantès becomes entangled (1815). He is paralyzed and can only communicate with his eyes, but retains his mental faculties and acts as protector to Valentine (1830s).
- Héloïse de Villefort: The murderous second wife of Gérard de Villefort, mother of Édouard. She kills Marquise de Saint-Méran, Barrois (Noirtier's servant) and finally herself and Édouard. She aimed to poison and kill Valentine to make Edouard the heir to Villefort's fortune, though it is the Count of Monte Cristo who ends up nearly killing Valentine as part of his punishment to Gérard de Villefort. Héloïse herself believed it was she who killed Valentine, as did everyone else. At the end of the novel it is revealed to us that Valentine did not die. Héloïse kills herself and Édouard after an outburst from Gérard de Villefort, who commands Héloïse to kill herself or be tried for murder after she 'killed' Valentine.
- Édouard (or Edward) de Villefort: The only legitimate son of de Villefort.
- Benedetto: The illegitimate son of de Villefort and Baroness Hermine Danglars (Hermine de Nargonne), raised by Bertuccio and his sister-in-law, Assunta, in Rogliano. While he and his loutish friends are torturing and trying to rob Assunta, they accidentally kill her. He runs away and later becomes "Andrea Cavalcanti" in Paris.

=== Morrel family ===
- Pierre Morrel: Dantès' employer, owner of Morrel & Son. He attempts to obtain Dantès' freedom immediately after his imprisonment (1815), but is unsuccessful. Later, on the verge of bankruptcy, he and his family are saved from ruin by the Count just as Pierre is about to kill himself (early 1830s).
- Maximilien Morrel: Son of Pierre Morrel, he is an army captain who becomes a friend of Dantès. In love with Valentine de Villefort (1830s).
- Julie Herbault: Daughter of Pierre Morrel, wife of Emmanuel Herbault.
- Emmanuel Herbault: An employee of Morrel & Son, who marries Julie Morrel and succeeds Pierre as the owner of the business.

=== Other characters ===
- Gaspard Caderousse: A tailor in Marseilles, he was a neighbor and friend of Dantès who knew of Danglars and Fernand's plot but did not speak up out of cowardice (1815). Having become an innkeeper, he is rewarded by "Abbé Busoni" with a valuable diamond for explaining the denunciation plot (early 1830s). He then turns to crime, spends time in prison, and is eventually murdered by Andrea Cavalcanti/Benedetto after attempting to burgle the Count of Monte Cristo's house.
- Madeleine Caderousse, née Radelle, dite La Carconte: Wife of Caderousse, she encouraged him to murder a Jewish jeweler to whom they were to sell their gifted diamond (from Abbé Busoni). She was mortally shot by the defending jeweler and then killed by Caderousse.
- Louis Dantès: Edmond Dantès' father, who dies from starvation during his son's imprisonment.
- Baron Franz d'Épinay: A friend of Albert de Morcerf, engaged to Valentine de Villefort (1830s). Originally, Dumas wrote part of the story, including the events in Rome and the return of Albert de Morcerf and Franz d'Épinay to Paris, in the first person from Franz d'Épinay's point of view.
- Lucien Debray: Secretary to the Minister of the Interior, a friend of Albert de Morcerf, and a lover of Madame Danglars, whom he provides with inside investment information, which she then passes on to her husband.
- Beauchamp: Journalist and Chief Editor of l'Impartial, and friend of Albert de Morcerf.
- Raoul, Baron de Château-Renaud: Member of a noble family and friend of Albert de Morcerf.
- Louise d'Armilly: Eugénie Danglars's music instructor, her intimate friend, and her implied lover. Eugénie and Louise later run off together following Eugénie and Andrea Cavalcanti's collapsed engagement (late 1830s).
- Monsieur de Boville: Originally an inspector of prisons, later a detective in the Paris force, and still later the Receiver-General of the charities.
- Barrois: Old, trusted servant of Monsieur Noirtier. He is unintentionally killed by a glass of poisoned lemonade meant for his master, Noirtier.
- Monsieur d'Avrigny: Family doctor treating the Villefort family.
- Major (also Marquis) Bartolomeo Cavalcanti: An old man who plays the role of Prince Andrea Cavalcanti's father.
- Ali Tebelen (or Ali Tepelini): An Albanian nationalist leader, Pasha of Yanina, whom Fernand Mondego betrays, leading to Ali Pasha's murder at the hands of the Turks and the seizure of his kingdom. His wife Vasiliki and daughter Haydée are sold into slavery by Fernand.
- Countess Teresa Guiccioli: Her name is not actually stated in the novel. She is referred to as "Countess G—".

== Background to elements of the plot ==
Georges, a short novel by Dumas, was published in 1843, preceding when The Count of Monte Cristo was written. Georges is of particular interest to scholars because Dumas reused many of the ideas and plot devices in The Count of Monte Cristo.

Dumas wrote that the germ of the idea of revenge as one of the novel's themes sprang from an anecdote (Le Diamant et la Vengeance) written by Jacques Peuchet, an archivist of the Paris police, and published in the multi-volume Mémoires tirés des Archives de la Police de Paris (Memoirs from the Archives of the Paris Police) in France in 1838. Dumas included this essay in one of the editions of his novel published in 1846.

Peuchet related the tale of a shoemaker, Pierre Picaud, living in Nîmes in 1807. Picaud was engaged to marry a wealthy woman, but three jealous friends falsely accused him of being a spy on behalf of England in a period of wars between France and England. Picaud was placed under a form of house arrest in the Fenestrelle Fort, where he was a servant to a rich Italian cleric. The cleric began to treat Picaud like a son, and when the cleric died, he left his fortune to Picaud. Picaud spent years plotting his revenge on the three men who were responsible for his misfortune. He stabbed the first with a dagger on which the words "Number One" were printed, and he poisoned the second. The third man, named Loupian, had married Picaud's fiancée while Picaud was under arrest. Picaud lured Loupian's son into crime and his daughter into prostitution, and then he fatally stabbed Loupian.

In another of the true stories reported by Ashton-Wolfe, Peuchet describes a poisoning in a family. This story is also mentioned in the Pléiade edition of this novel, and it probably served as a model for the chapter of the murders inside the Villefort family. The introduction to the Pléiade edition mentions other sources from real life: a man, Abbé Faria, did exist. He was imprisoned but did not die in prison; he died in 1819 and left no large legacy to anyone. As for Dantès, his fate is quite different from his model in Peuchet's book, since that model is murdered by the "Caderousse" of the plot.

== Publication ==
The Count of Monte Cristo was originally published in the Journal des Débats in eighteen parts. Serialization ran from 28 August 1844 to 15 January 1846. The first edition in book form was published in Paris by Pétion in 18 volumes with the first two issued in 1844 and the remaining sixteen in 1845. Most of the Belgian pirated editions, the first Paris edition and many others up to the Lécrivain et Toubon illustrated edition of 1860 feature a misspelling of the title with "Christo" used instead of "Cristo". The first edition to feature the correct spelling was the L'Écho des Feuilletons illustrated edition, Paris 1846. This edition featured plates by Paul Gavarni and Tony Johannot and was said to be "revised" and "corrected", although only the chapter structure appears to have been altered with an additional chapter entitled La Maison des Allées de Meilhan having been created by splitting Le Départ into two.

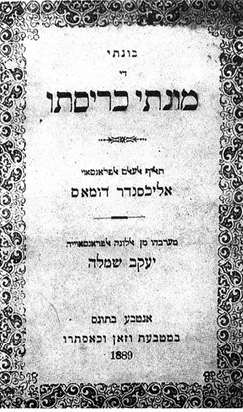
Front page of translation into Judeo-Tunisian Arabic, 1889

=== English translations ===
The first appearance of The Count of Monte Cristo in English was the first part of a serialization by W. Harrison Ainsworth in volume VII of Ainsworth's Magazine published in 1845, although this was an abridged summary of the first part of the novel only and was entitled The Prisoner of If. Ainsworth translated the remaining chapters of the novel, again in abridged form, and issued these in volumes VIII and IX of the magazine in 1845 and 1846 respectively. Another abridged serialization appeared in The London Journal between 1846 and 1847.

The first single volume translation in English was an abridged edition with woodcuts published by Geo Pierce in January 1846 entitled The Prisoner of If or The Revenge of Monte Christo.

In April 1846, volume three of the Parlour Novelist, Belfast, Ireland: Simms and M'Intyre, London: W S Orr and Company, featured the first part of an unabridged translation of the novel by Emma Hardy. The remaining two parts would be issued as the Count of Monte Christo volumes I and II in volumes 8 and 9 of the Parlour Novelist respectively.

The most common English translation is an anonymous one originally published in 1846 by Chapman and Hall. This was originally released in ten weekly installments from March 1846 with six pages of letterpress and two illustrations by M Valentin. The translation was released in book form with all twenty illustrations in two volumes in May 1846, a month after the release of the first part of the above-mentioned translation by Emma Hardy. The translation follows the revised French edition of 1846, with the correct spelling of "Cristo" and the extra chapter The House on the Allées de Meilhan.

Most English editions of the novel follow the anonymous translation. In 1889, two of the major American publishers Little Brown and T.Y. Crowell updated the translation, correcting mistakes and revising the text to reflect the original serialized version. This resulted in the removal of the chapter The House on the Allées de Meilhan, with the text restored to the end of the chapter called The Departure.

In 1955, Collins published an updated version of the anonymous translation which cut several passages, including a whole chapter entitled The Past, and renamed others. This abridgment was republished by many Collins imprints and other publishers including the Modern Library, Vintage, and the 1998 Oxford World's Classics edition (later editions restored the text). In 2008 Oxford released a revised edition with translation by David Coward. The 2009 Everyman's Library edition reprints the original anonymous English translation that first appeared in 1846, with revisions by Peter Washington and an introduction by Umberto Eco.

In 1996, Penguin Classics published a new translation by Robin Buss. Buss' translation updated the language, making the text more accessible to modern readers, and restored content that was modified in the 1846 translation because of Victorian English social restrictions (for example, references to Eugénie's lesbian traits and behavior) to reflect Dumas' original version.

In addition to the above, there have also been many abridged translations such as an 1892 edition published by F.M. Lupton, translated by Henry L. Williams (this translation was also released by M.J. Ivers in 1892 with Williams using the pseudonym of Professor William Thiese). A more recent abridgment is the translation by Lowell Bair for Bantam Classics in 1956.

Many abridged translations omit the Count's enthusiasm for hashish. When serving a hashish jam to the young Frenchman Franz d'Épinay, the Count (calling himself Sinbad the Sailor), calls it, "nothing less than the ambrosia which Hebe served at the table of Jupiter". When he arrives in Paris, the Count brandishes an emerald box in which he carries small green pills compounded of hashish and opium which he uses for sleeplessness. (Source: Chapters 31, 32, 38, 40, 53 & 77 in the 117-chapter unabridged Pocket Books edition.) Dumas was a member of the Club des Hashischins.

In June 2017, Manga Classics, an imprint of UDON Entertainment, published The Count of Monte Cristo as a faithfully adapted manga.

=== Japanese translations ===
The first Japanese translation by Kuroiwa Shūroku was entitled "Shigai Shiden Gankutsu-ou" (史外史伝巌窟王, A historical story from outside history, the King of the Cavern), and serialized from 1901 to 1902 in the newspaper Yorozu Chōhō. It was released in book form in four volumes by publisher Aoki Suusandou in 1905. Though later translations use the title "Monte Cristo-haku" (モンテ・クリスト伯, The Count of Monte Cristo), the "Gankutsu-ou" title remains highly associated with the novel and is often used as an alternative. As of March 2016, all movie adaptations of the novel brought to Japan used the title "Gankutsu-ou", with the exception of the 2002 film, which has it as a subtitle (with the title itself simply being Monte Cristo).

The novel is popular in Japan, and has spawned numerous adaptations, the most notable of which are the novels Meiji Gankutsu-ou by Taijirou Murasame and Shin Gankutsu-ou by Kaitarō Hasegawa. Its influence can also be seen in perception of one of the first prominent cases of miscarriage of justice in Japan, in which an innocent man was charged with murder and imprisoned for half a century; it is known in Japanese as the "Yoshida Gankutsu-ou incident" (吉田岩窟王事件).

=== Chinese translations ===
The first translation into Chinese was published in 1907. The novel had been a personal favorite of Jiang Qing, and the 1978 translation became one of the first mass-popularized foreign novels in mainland China after the end of the Cultural Revolution. Since then, there have been another 22 Chinese translations.

== Reception and legacy ==
The original work was published in serial form in the Journal des Débats in 1844. Carlos Javier Villafane Mercado described the effect in Europe:

The effect of the serials, which held vast audiences enthralled ... is unlike any experience of reading we are likely to have known ourselves, maybe something like that of a particularly gripping television series. Day after day, at breakfast or at work or on the street, people talked of little else.

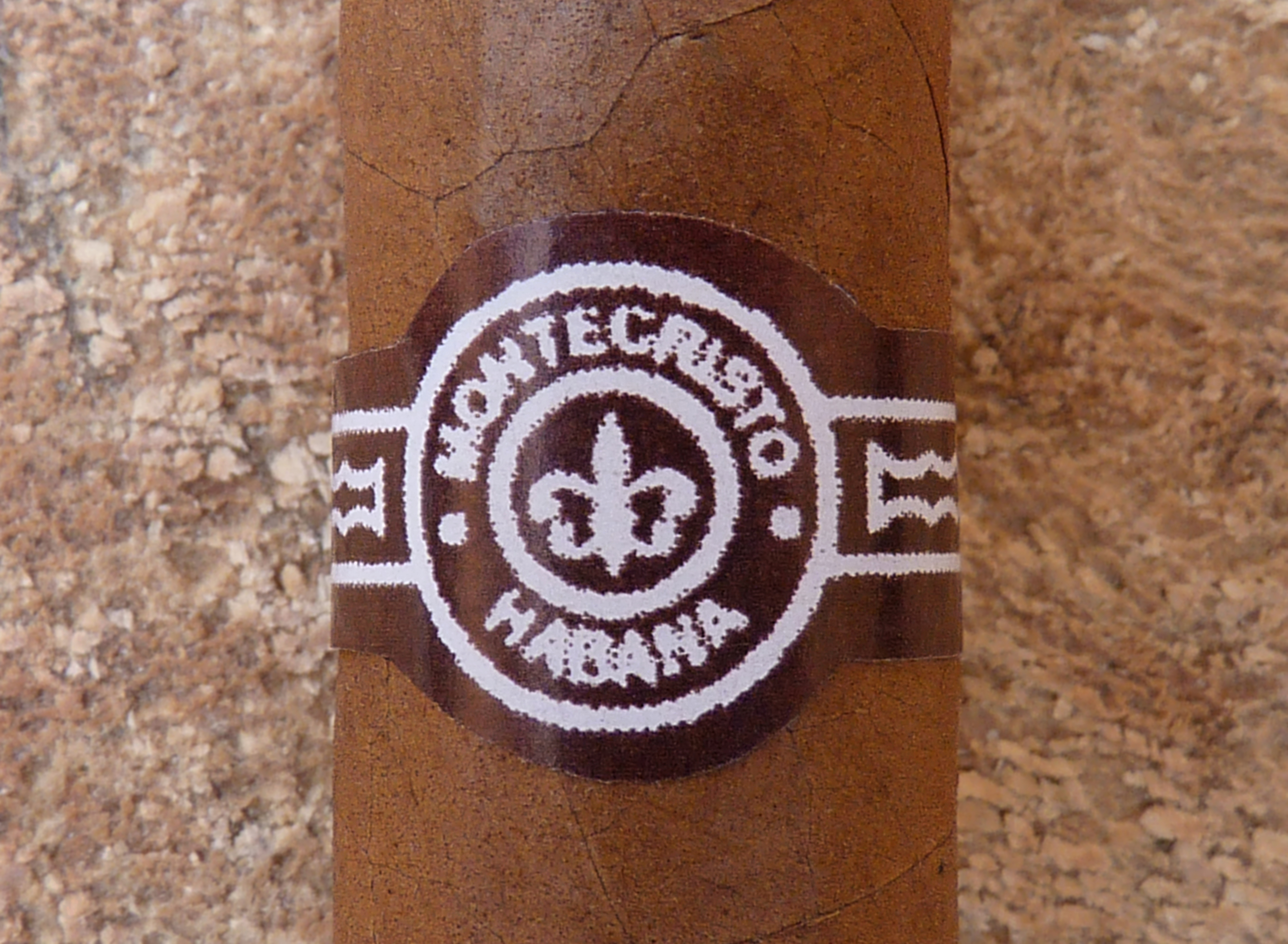
The Montecristo Cuban cigar brand is allegedly named after the fondness of cigar rollers for listening to the novel read by a lector during their work.

George Saintsbury stated that "Monte Cristo is said to have been at its first appearance, and for some time subsequently, the most popular book in Europe. Perhaps no novel within a given number of years had so many readers and penetrated into so many different countries." This popularity has extended into modern times as well. The book was "translated into virtually all modern languages and has never been out of print in most of them. There have been at least twenty-nine motion pictures based on it ... as well as several television series, and many movies [have] worked the name 'Monte Cristo' into their titles." The title Monte Cristo lives on in a "famous gold mine, a line of luxury Cuban cigars, a sandwich, and any number of bars and casinos—it even lurks in the name of the street-corner hustle three-card monte."

Modern Russian writer and philologist Vadim Nikolayev determined The Count of Monte-Cristo to be a megapolyphonic novel.

The novel has been the inspiration for many other books, from Lew Wallace's Ben-Hur (1880), then to a science fiction retelling in Alfred Bester's The Stars My Destination, and to Stephen Fry's The Stars' Tennis Balls (entitled Revenge in the U.S.).

Fantasy novelist Steven Brust's 2020 novel The Baron of Magister Valley uses The Count of Monte Cristo as a starting point. Jin Yong has admitted some influence from Dumas, his favorite non-Chinese novelist. Some commentators feel that the plot of A Deadly Secret resembles The Count of Monte Cristo, except that they are based in different countries and historical periods.

== Historical background ==
In the novel, Dumas tells of the 1815 return of Napoleon I, and alludes to contemporary events when the governor at the Château d'If is promoted to a position at the castle of Ham. (Note: The governor at the Château d'If is promoted to a position at the castle of Ham, which is the castle where Louis Napoleon was imprisoned 1840–46, on page 140 of the novel.) The attitude of Dumas towards "bonapartisme" was conflicted. His father, Thomas-Alexandre Dumas, (Note: Thomas Alexandre Dumas was also known as Alexandre Davy de la Pailleterie.) a Haitian of mixed descent, became a successful general during the French Revolution. In 1840, the body of Napoleon I was brought to France and became an object of veneration in the church of Les Invalides, renewing popular patriotic support for the Bonaparte family. As the story opens, the character Dantès is not aware of the politics, considers himself simply a good French citizen, and is caught between the conflicting loyalties of the royalist Villefort during the Restoration, and the father of Villefort, Noirtier, loyal to Napoleon, a firm Bonapartist, and the Bonapartist loyalty of his late captain, in a period of rapid changes of government in France.

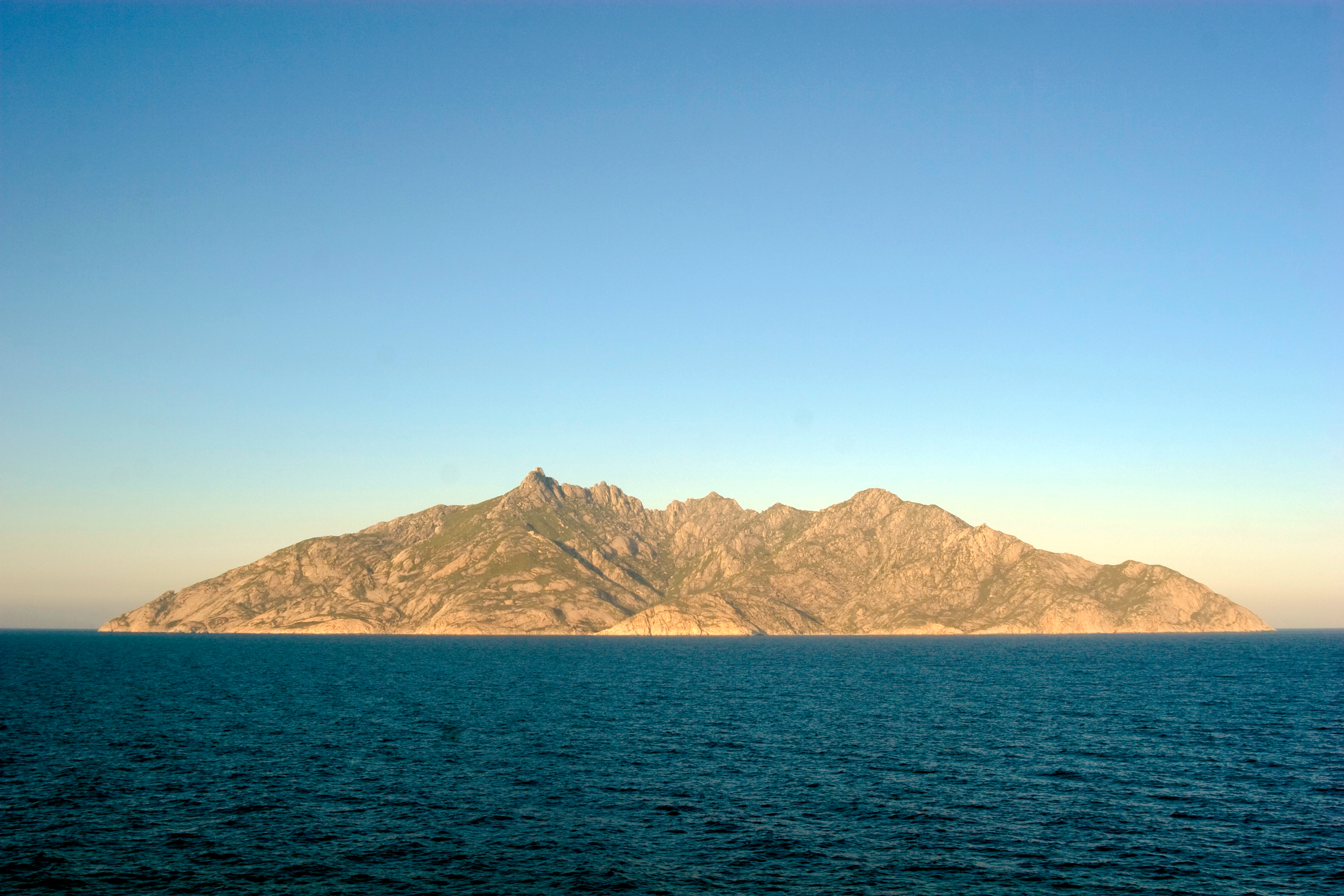
Montecristo islet, view from the north

In Causeries (1860), Dumas published a short paper, "État civil du Comte de Monte-Cristo", on the genesis of his story. (Note: "État civil du Comte de Monte-Cristo" is included as an "annexe" to the novel.) It appears that Dumas had close contacts with members of the Bonaparte family while living in Florence in 1841. He sailed around the island of Montecristo in a small boat, accompanied by a young prince, a son to Louis Bonaparte, who was to become Emperor Napoleon III of the French ten years later, in 1851. During this trip, he promised that son of Louis Bonaparte that he would write a novel with the island's name in the title. In 1841, when Dumas made his promise, Louis Bonaparte himself was imprisoned at the citadel of Ham – the place mentioned in the novel. Dumas did visit him there, although Dumas does not mention it in "Etat civil".

== Selected adaptations ==
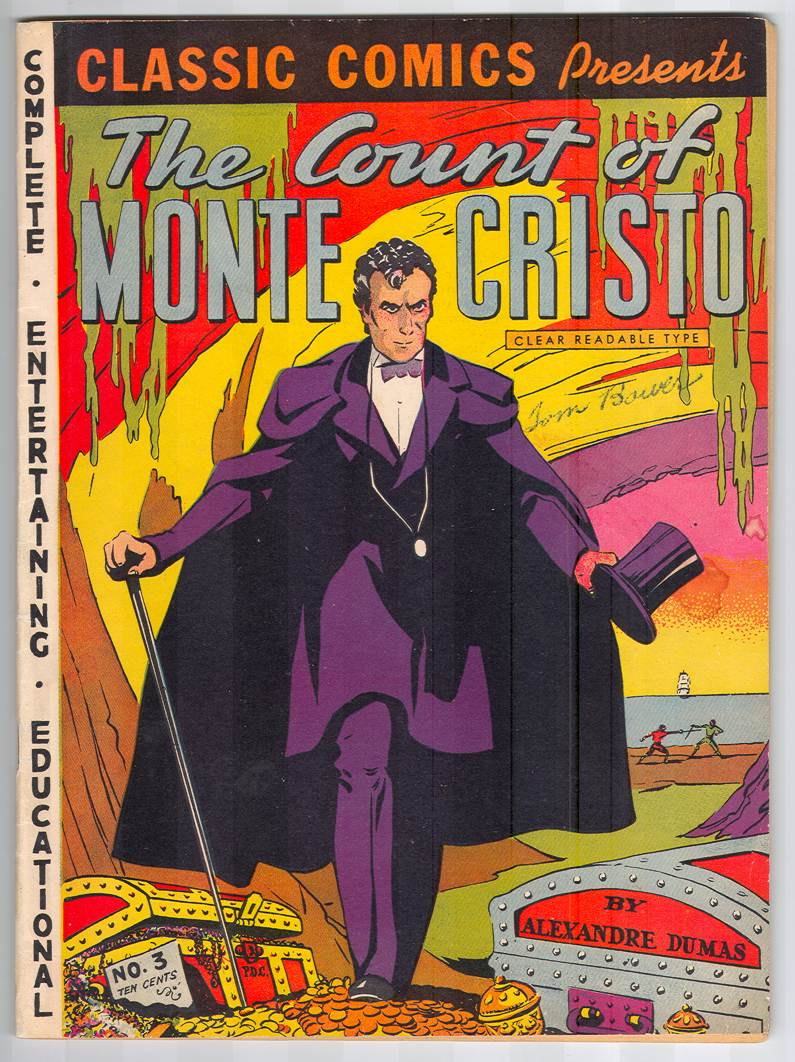
Classic Comics, The Count of Monte Cristo, Issue #3, published 1942.

=== Film ===
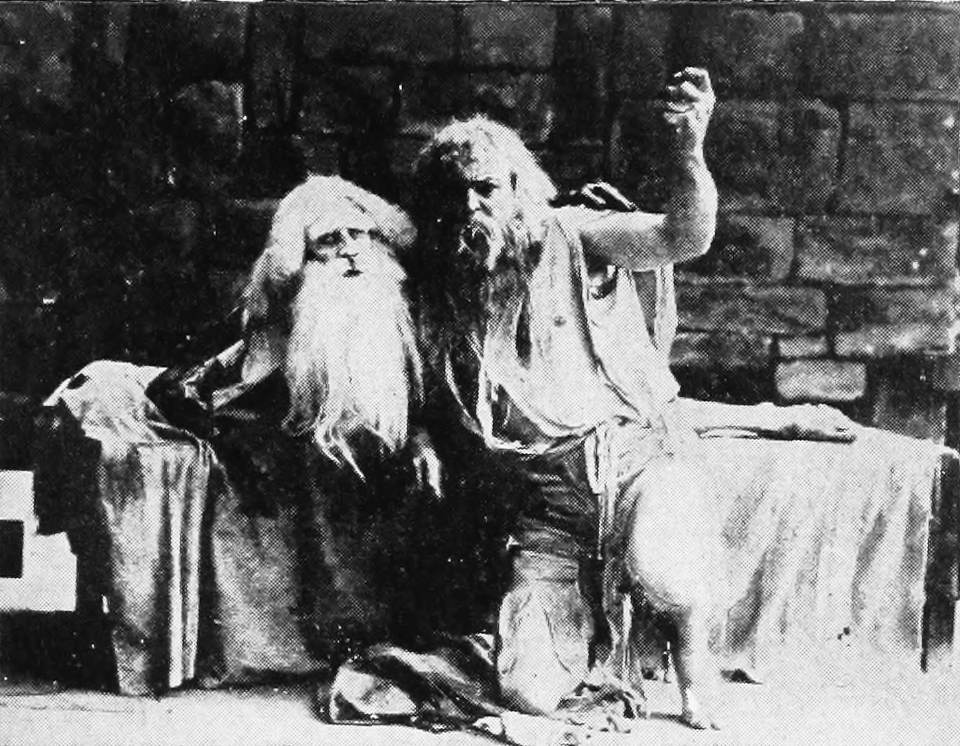
Hobart Bosworth (right) in The Count of Monte Cristo (1908)

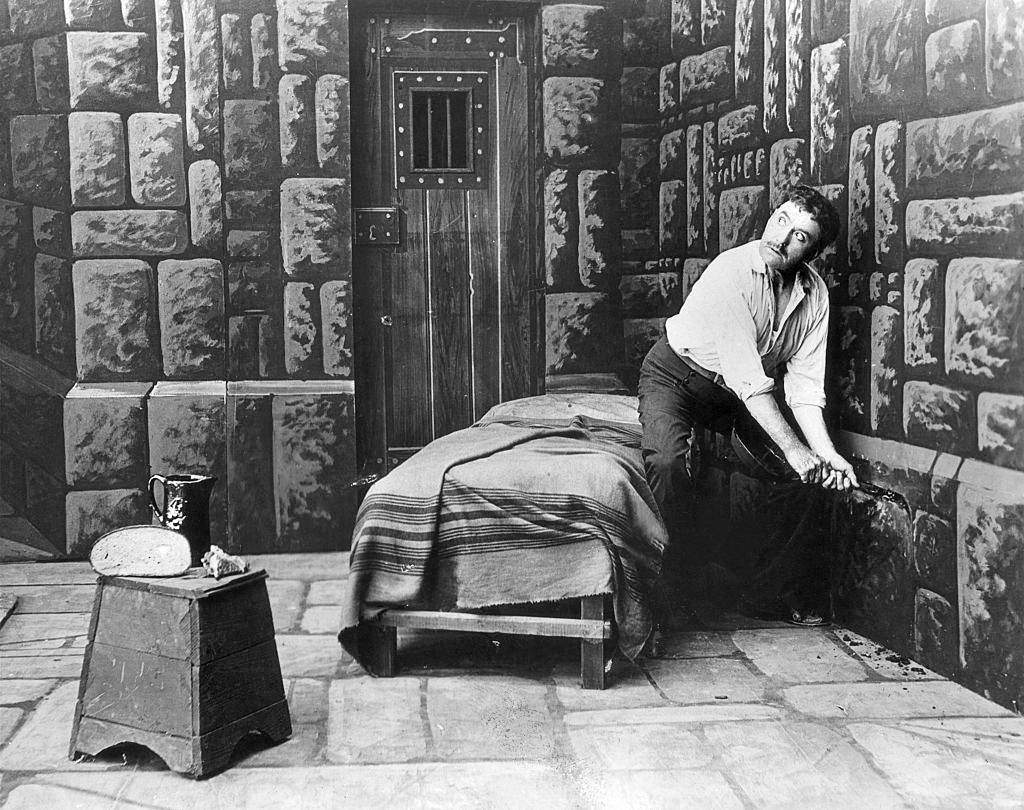
Edmond Dantès (James O'Neill) loosens a stone before making his escape from the Château d'If in The Count of Monte Cristo (1913)

- 1908: The Count of Monte Cristo, a silent film starring Hobart Bosworth
- 1913: The Count of Monte Cristo, a silent film starring James O'Neill
- 1918: The Count of Monte Cristo, a silent-film serial starring Léon Mathot
- 1922: Monte Cristo, starring John Gilbert and directed by Emmett J. Flynn
- 1929: Monte Cristo, restored silent epic directed by Henri Fescourt
- 1934: The Count of Monte Cristo, directed by Rowland V. Lee
- 1942: The Count of Monte Cristo (Spanish: El Conde de Montecristo), a Mexican film version, directed by Chano Urueta and starring Arturo de Córdova
- 1943: The Count of Monte Cristo, directed by Robert Vernay
- 1946: The Return of Monte Cristo, directed by Henry Levin
- 1946: The Wife of Monte Cristo, directed by Edgar G. Ulmer
- 1953: The Count of Monte Cristo (Spanish: El Conde de Montecristo), directed by León Klimovsky and starring Jorge Mistral
- 1954: The Count of Monte Cristo, starring Jean Marais
- 1958: Vanjikottai Valiban (வஞ்சிக்கோட்டை வாலிபன்), Tamil film adaptation and its Hindi remake Raaj Tilak
- 1961: Le comte de Monte Cristo, starring Louis Jourdan, directed by Claude Autant-Lara
- 1968: Sous le signe de Monte Cristo, French film starring Paul Barge, Claude Jade and Anny Duperey, directed by André Hunebelle, and set in 1947
- 1975: The Count of Monte Cristo, TV film starring Richard Chamberlain, directed by David Greene
- 1982: Padayottam, a Malayalam film adaption set in Kerala context, directed by Jijo Punnoose, starring Prem Nazir, Madhu, Mammootty and Mohanlal
- 1986: Veta, Telugu film adaptation
- 1986: Legacy of Rage, a Cantonese-language adaptation starring Brandon Lee
- 1986: Asipatha Mamai, a Sinhala adaptation
- 1988: Uznik zamka If (The Prisoner of Château d'If), a 3-part Soviet adaptation starring Viktor Avilov (Count of Monte Cristo) and Aleksei Petrenko (Abbé Faria), with music and songs of Alexander Gradsky
- 2002: The Count of Monte Cristo, directed by Kevin Reynolds and starring Jim Caviezel, Dagmara Domińczyk, Richard Harris and Guy Pearce
- 2024: The Count of Monte Cristo directed by Matthieu Delaporte and Alexandre de La Patellière and starring Pierre Niney

=== Television ===
- 1956: The Count of Monte Cristo, TV series based on further adventures of Edmond Dantès after the end of the novel
- 1964: The Count of Monte Cristo, BBC television serial starring Alan Badel and Natasha Parry
- 1966: Il conte di Montecristo, RAI Italian television serial directed by Edmo Fenoglio. starring Andrea Giordana
- 1973: The Count of Monte Cristo, UK/Italian animated series, produced by Halas and Batchelor and RAI Italy
- 1977: The Great Vendetta (大報復), Hong Kong television serial starring Adam Cheng, in which the background of the story is changed to Southern China during the Republican Era
- 1979: Nihon Gankutsuou (日本巌窟王), Japanese television serial set in Edo period, starring Masao Kusakari
- 1979: Le Comte de Monte-Cristo (1979 miniseries), French TV series starring Jacques Weber
- 1984: La Dueña, a 1984 Venezuelan telenovela with a female version of Edmond Dantès
- 1994: Marimar, a Spanish language television series by Televisa that later spawned remakes in Mexico and the Philippines.
- 1996: Itihaas, an Indian television series, created by Nirmala Sood and co-produced by Ekta Kapoor and Shobha Kapoor under their banner Balaji Telefilms.
- 1998: The Count of Monte Cristo, television miniseries starring Gérard Depardieu
- 2004: Gankutsuou: The Count of Monte Cristo (巌窟王 Gankutsuoo, literally "The King of the Cave"), Japanese animation adaptation taking place in the 51st century. Produced by Gonzo, directed by Mahiro Maeda
- 2006: Montecristo, Argentine telenovela starring Pablo Echarri and Paola Krum
- 2006: Vingança, telenovela directed by Rodrigo Riccó and Paulo Rosa, SIC Portugal
- 2010: Ezel, a Turkish television series which is an adaptation of The Count of Monte Cristo
- 2011: Un amore e una vendetta (English: Love and Vendetta), an Italian television series loosely based on the book
- 2011: Revenge, a television series billed as an adaptation of The Count of Monte Cristo
  - In 2013, a Turkish adaption of the series was released under the name İntikam starring Beren Saat
- 2012: Antsanoty, an Armenia-Armenian television series which is an adaptation of The Count of Monte Cristo
- 2013: La Patrona, a loose Mexican remake of 1984 telenovela La Dueña
- 2016: Goodbye Mr. Black, a South Korean TV series loosely based on The Count of Monte Cristo.
- 2016: Once Upon a Time's sixth season features the Count as a character, portrayed by Craig Horner. Several characters and plot elements from the story are also alluded to
- 2016: Yago, Mexican telenovela starring Iván Sánchez and Gabriela de la Garza
- 2018: The Count of Monte-Cristo: Gorgeous Revenge (モンテ・クリスト伯 –華麗なる復讐- Monte Kurisuto Haku: Kareinaru Fukushū), a Japanese TV series starring Dean Fujioka
- 2018: Wes, a Sri Lankan-Sinhala television series that is an adaptation of The Count of Monte Cristo and was influenced by Ezel television series
- 2021: Miss Monte-Cristo, a South Korean adaptation on KBS featuring female characters
- 2023: Montecristo, a Mexican adaptation on Vix+ starring William Levy
- 2024: The Count of Monte Cristo, Italian and French produced, English-language 8-part series starring Sam Claflin

=== Other appearances in film or television ===
- 1973: The Count of Monte Cristo, animated short produced by Hanna-Barbera
- 2007: The first section of The Simpsons episode "Revenge Is a Dish Best Served Three Times" has an adaptation of The Count of Monte Cristo but it is entitled The Count of Monte Fatso

=== Sequel books ===
In 1853, a work professing to be the sequel of the book, entitled The Hand of the Deceased, appeared in Portuguese and French editions (respectively entitled A Mão do finado and La Main du défunt). The novel, falsely attributed to Dumas, but in fact, originally published anonymously or sometimes attributed to one F. Le Prince, has been traced to Portuguese writer Alfredo Possolo Hogan.

Other sequels include:

- 1856: The Lord of the World, by Adolf Mützelburg.
- 1881: The Son of Monte Cristo, Jules Lermina (1839–1915). This novel was divided in the English translation into two books: The Wife of Monte Cristo and The Son of Monte Cristo). Both were published in English in New York, 1884, translated by Jacob Ralph Abarbanell (1852–1922).
- 1884: Edmond Dantès: The Sequel to Alexander Dumas' Celebrated Novel The Count of Monte Cristo, Edmund Flagg (1815–1890). Published in English by T.B. Peterson and Brothers in 1886 (no translator credited).
- 1884: Monte-Cristo's Daughter: Sequel to Alexander Dumas' Great Novel, "The Count of Monte-Cristo," and Conclusion of "Edmond Dantès", Edmund Flagg. Published in English by T.B. Peterson and Brothers in 1886 (no translator credited).
- 1885: The Treasure of Monte-Cristo, Jules Lermina (1839–1915).
- 1869: The Countess of Monte Cristo, Jean Charles Du Boys (1836–1873). Published in English by T.B. Peterson and Brothers in 1871 (no translator credited).
- 1887: Monte Cristo and his wife, presumably by Jacob Ralph Abarbanell.
- 1902: Countess of Monte Cristo, by Jacob Ralph Abarbanell.

=== Plays and musicals ===
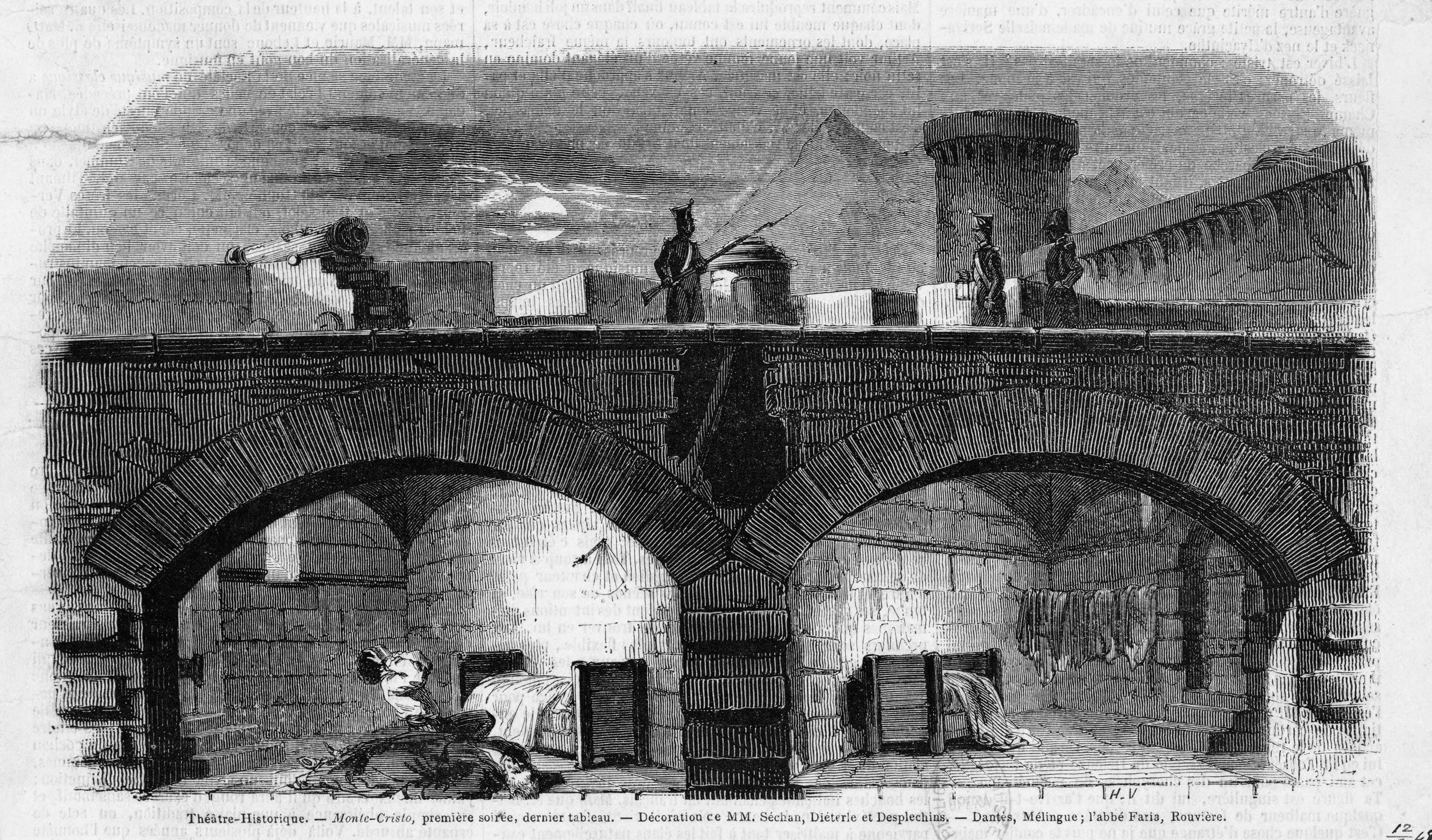
Premiere of Dumas' Monte Cristo at Théâtre Historique (1848)

Alexandre Dumas and Auguste Maquet wrote a set of four plays that collectively told the story of The Count of Monte Cristo: Monte Cristo Part I (1848); Monte Cristo Part II (1848); Le Comte de Morcerf (1851) and Villefort (1851). The first two plays were first performed at Dumas' own Théâtre Historique in February 1848, with the performance spread over two nights, each with a long duration (the first evening ran from 6 pm until midnight). The play was also unsuccessfully performed at Drury Lane in London later that year where rioting erupted in protest against French companies performing in England.

The adaptation differs from the novel in many respects: several characters, such as Luigi Vampa, are excluded; whereas the novel includes many different plot threads that are brought together at the conclusion, the third and fourth plays deal only with the fate of Mondego and Villefort respectively (Danglars's fate is not featured at all); the play is the first to feature Dantès shouting "the world is mine!", an iconic line that would be used in many future adaptations.

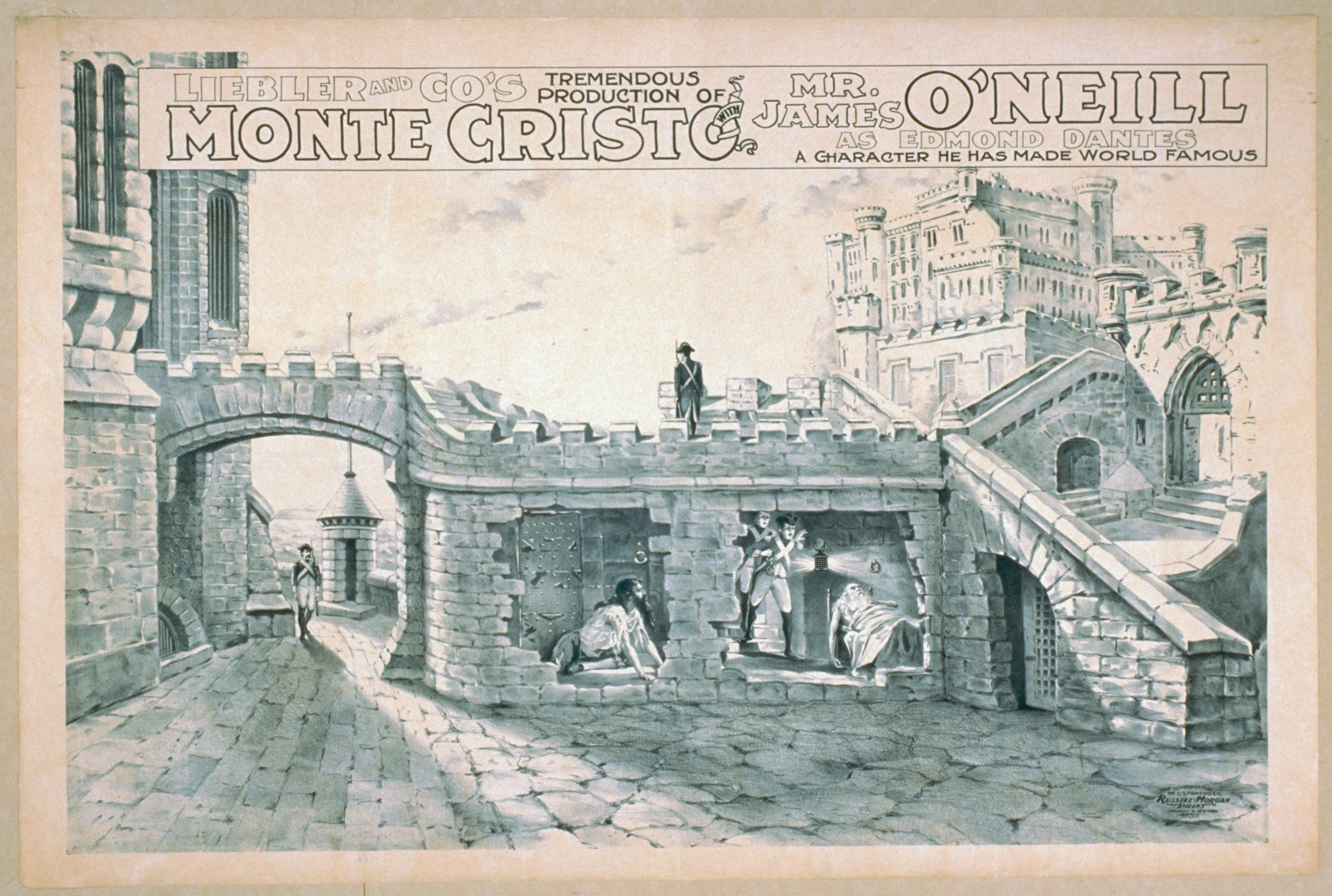
Poster for a 1900 production of Charles Fechter's adaptation of The Count of Monte Cristo, starring James O'Neill

Two English adaptations of the novel were published in 1868. The first, by Hailes Lacy, differs only slightly from Dumas' version with the main change being that Fernand Mondego is killed in a duel with the Count rather than committing suicide. Much more radical was the version by Charles Fechter, a notable French-Anglo actor. The play faithfully follows the first part of the novel, omits the Rome section and makes several sweeping changes to the third part, among the most significant being that Albert is actually the son of Dantès. The fates of the three main antagonists are also altered: Villefort, whose fate is dealt with quite early on in the play, kills himself after being foiled by the Count trying to kill Noirtier (Villefort's half brother in this version); Mondego kills himself after being confronted by Mercedes; Danglars is killed by the Count in a duel. The ending sees Dantès and Mercedes reunited and the character of Haydee is not featured at all. The play was first performed at the Adelphi in London in October 1868. The original duration was five hours, resulting in Fechter abridging the play, which, despite negative reviews, had a respectable sixteen-week run. Fechter moved to the United States in 1869 and Monte Cristo was chosen for the inaugural play at the opening of the Globe Theatre, Boston in 1870. Fechter last performed the role in 1878.

In 1883, John Stetson, manager of the Booth Theatre and The Globe Theatre, wanted to revive the play and asked James O'Neill (the father of playwright Eugene O'Neill) to perform the lead role. O'Neill, who had never seen Fechter perform, made the role his own and the play became a commercial, if not an artistic success. O'Neill made several abridgments to the play and eventually bought it from Stetson. A motion picture based on Fechter's play, with O'Neill in the title role, was released in 1913 but was not a huge success. O'Neill died in 1920, two years before a more successful motion picture, produced by Fox and partially based on Fechter's version, was released. O'Neill came to despise the role of Monte Cristo, which he performed more than 6000 times, feeling that his typecasting had prevented him from pursuing more artistically rewarding roles. This discontent later became a plot point in Eugene O'Neill's semi-autobiographical play Long Day's Journey Into Night.

In 2008, the Russian theater of Moscow Operetta set a musical Monte-Cristo based on the book with music of Roman Ignatiev and lyrics of Yulii Kim. Six years later it won in Daegu International Musical Festival in South Korea. Original plot was slightly changed and some characters are not mentioned in the musical.

The Count of Monte Cristo is a musical based on the novel, with influences from the 2002 film adaptation of the book. The music is written by Frank Wildhorn and the lyrics and book are by Jack Murphy. It debuted in Switzerland in 2009.

The Count of Monte Cristo was additionally adapted into a musical in 2011 by American musician and composer James Behr.

=== Audio adaptations ===
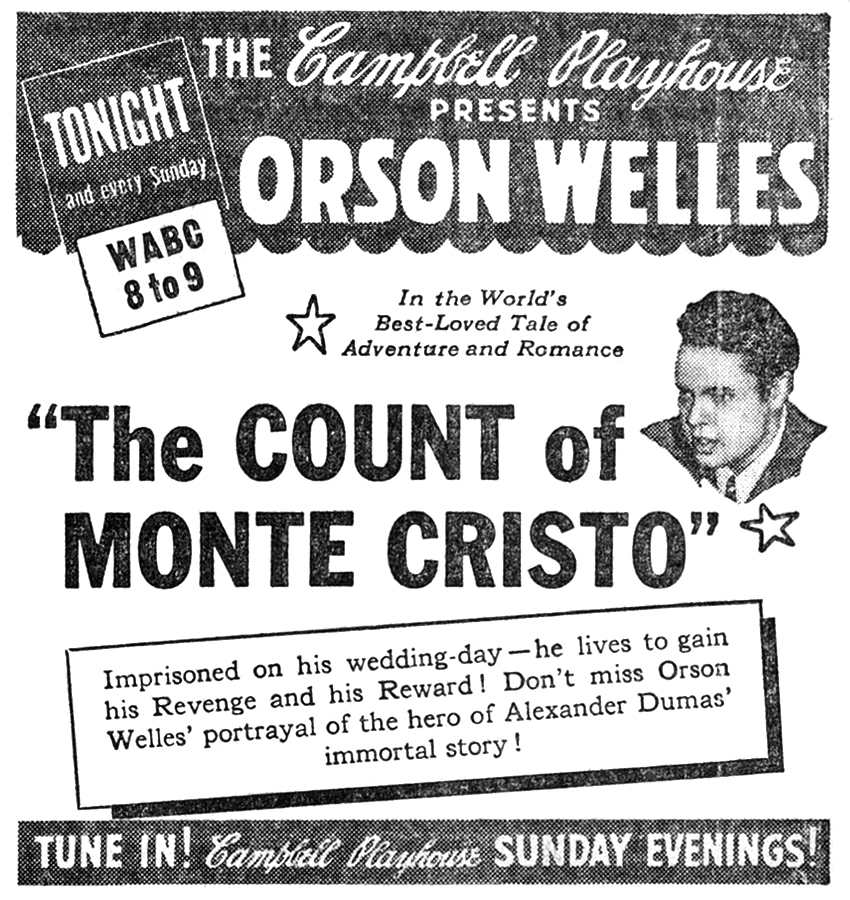
Newspaper advertisement for The Campbell Playhouse presentation of "The Count of Monte Cristo" (1 October 1939)

- 1938: The Mercury Theatre on the Air with Orson Welles (Dantès), Ray Collins (Abbé Faria), George Coulouris (Monsieur Morrel), Edgar Barrier (de Villefort), Eustace Wyatt (Caderousse), Paul Stewart (Paul Dantès) Sidney Smith (Mondego), Richard Wilson (the Officer), Virginia Welles (Mercédès); radio broadcast 29 August 1938
- 1939: The Campbell Playhouse with Orson Welles (Dantès), Ray Collins (Caderousse), Everett Sloane (Abbé Faria), Frank Readick (Villefort), George Coulouris (Danglars), Edgar Barrier (Mondego), Richard Wilson (a Jailer), Agnes Moorehead (Mercédès); radio broadcast 1 October 1939
- 1939: Robert Montgomery on the Lux Radio Theater (radio)
- 1947–52: The Count of Monte Cristo radio program starring Carleton Young
- 1960s: Paul Daneman for Tale Spinners For Children series (LP) UAC 11044
- 1961: Louis Jourdan for Caedmon Records (LP)
- 1964: Per Edström director (radio series in Sweden)
- 1987: Andrew Sachs on BBC Radio 4 (later BBC Radio 7 and BBC Radio 4 Extra), adapted by Barry Campbell and directed by Graham Gould, with Alan Wheatley as L'Abbe Faria, Nigel Anthony as de Villefort, Geoffrey Matthews as Danglars and Melinda Walker as Mercedes
- 1989: Richard Matthews for Penguin Random House (ISBN 978-1415912218)
- 2005: John Lee for Blackstone Audio
- 2010: Bill Homewood for Naxos Audiobooks (ISBN 978-9626341346)
- 2012: Iain Glen on BBC Radio 4, adapted by Sebastian Baczkiewicz and directed by Jeremy Mortimer and Sasha Yevtushenko, with Richard Johnson as Faria, Jane Lapotaire as the aged Haydee, Toby Jones as Danglars, Zubin Varla as Fernand, Paul Rhys as Villefort and Josette Simon as Mercedes
- 2017: The Count of Monte Cristo musical adaption by Berry & Butler
- 2021: Radio Mirchi Kolkata's station aired The Count of Monte Cristo in Bengali, translated by Rajarshee Gupta for Mirchi's Sunday Suspense Programme. Edmond Dantès was voiced by actor Gaurav Chakrabarty. Abbé Faria was voiced by RJ Mir, Fernand Mondego by Anirban Bhattacharya and the story was narrated by RJ Deep. Apart from being a 6-hours epic, this adaptation was famous for having "Pitcairn Story" as the background music. This BGM is now being more identified with this epic.
