= Cristy =

Cristy is a given name and surname. Notable people with the name include:

- Cristy Fermin (born 1958), Filipino talk show host
- Cristy Lane (born 1940), American country and gospel singer
- Cristy Thom (born 1971), American model, actress, and artist
- Austin P. Cristy (1850–1926), American newspaper publisher
- James Cristy (1913–1989), American swimmer

== See also ==
- Christy (disambiguation)
- Crist (surname)
- Crista (disambiguation)
- Cristi, name
- Kristy, given name
