= The Return of Monte Cristo =

The Return of Monte Cristo may refer to:

- The Return of Monte Cristo (1946 film), an American film
- The Return of Monte Cristo (1968 film), a French film

== See also ==
- Monte Cristo (disambiguation)
- The Count of Monte Cristo (disambiguation)
- The Countess of Monte Cristo (disambiguation)
