= Monte Cristi =

The name Monte Cristi or Montecristi may refer to the following places:

== Dominican Republic ==
- Monte Cristi Province
- Monte Cristi, Dominican Republic, the capital of Monte Cristi Province
- Monte Cristi National Park

== Ecuador ==
- Montecristi Canton, a canton in Manabí Province
- Montecristi, Ecuador, the capital of Montecristi Canton

== See also ==
- Monte (disambiguation)
- Cristi (name)
- Monte Cristo (disambiguation)
