= Crista Arangala =

American mathematician

Crista Arangala (née Crista Lynn Coles) is an American mathematician and textbook author, specializing in numerical analysis. She is a professor of mathematics and chair of the department of mathematics and statistics at Elon University, and a Fulbright Scholar.

== Education ==
Arangala graduated from Allegheny College in 1993. She earned her Ph.D. in 2000 from the University of Cincinnati, with a dissertation on Numerical Identification of Parameters in Inverse Heat Conduction and Inverse Euler Bernoulli Beam Theory supervised by Diego Antonio Murio.

== International work ==
Arangala has regularly taken her Elon mathematics classes to India and Sri Lanka, where they have participated in elementary-school mathematics education. In 2013–2014 she was a Fulbright Scholar in Sri Lanka.

== Books ==
Arangala's books include:

- Arangala, Crista (2014), Exploring Linear Algebra : Labs and Projects with Mathematica ®., Hoboken: CRC Press, ISBN 978-1-4822-4150-1, OCLC 908079421
- Arangala, Crista (2017), Exploring calculus : labs and projects with Mathematica, Karen A. Yokley, Boca Raton, ISBN 978-1-4987-7104-7, OCLC 954480489
- Arangala, Crista (2017), Mathematical modeling : branching beyond calculus, Nick Luke, Karen A. Yokley, Boca Raton, ISBN 978-1-315-12064-5, OCLC 1021174066
- Arangala, Crista (2019), Exploring linear algebra : labs and projects with Matlab, Boca Raton, ISBN 978-1-351-66407-3, OCLC 1089729073
