= Crista interfenestralis =

Anatomical feature

The crista interfenestralis is an anatomical feature found in the inner ear of many reptiles. It is a bone ridge that divides the inner ear into two parts, the anterior and the posterior. The anterior part contains the fenestra ovalis and seems to be analogous to the vestibular duct, whereas the posterior part is analogous to the recess for the tympanic duct.

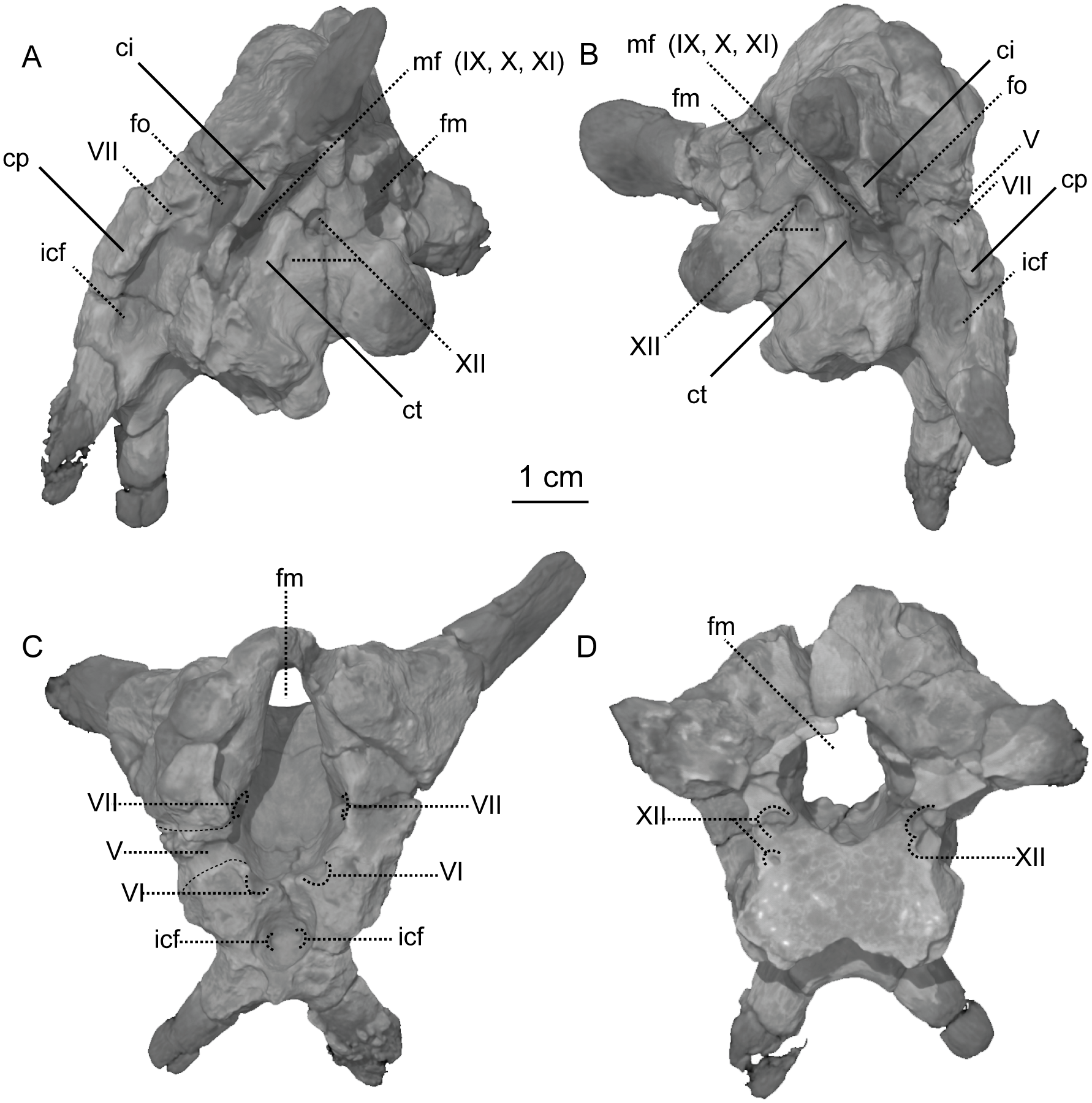
CT-volume-rendered images of the major openings for the cranial nerves and blood vessels of the holotype braincase of Sarahsaurus aurifontanalis. Crista interfenestralis ("ci") is visible in the upper images.
