= Crista dividens =

Structure in the developing heart of the human embryo

Crista dividens is a structure in the developing heart of the human embryo that divides the right atrium in a way such that it creates a pan systolic murmur in the same way as the foramen ovale. The absence of this murmur can indicate a potentially terminal cardiac defect in a newborn.

== Function ==
The crista dividens plays a role in separating oxygenated blood from the ductus venosus and deoxygenated blood from the inferior vena cava (IVC) draining the caudal portion of the fetus into the left and right atria, respectively. The crista dividens is located on the inferior edge of the interatrial septum and faces the opening of the IVC. As blood enters the heart from the IVC, it hits the crista dividens and is divided into two streams, with one stream entering the right atrium and the other entering the left atrium. The ductus venosus joins the terminal portion of the IVC, just before the right atrium. Before the ductus venosus joins the IVC, it is positioned in such a way that the oxygenated blood flowing into the IVC from the ductus venosus preferentially passes on the side of the crista dividens that directs the blood stream toward the left atrium. The rest of the IVC (prior to the joining of the ductus venosus) carries deoxygenated blood from the caudal (inferior) part of the fetus, and is directed toward the side of the crista dividens that directs blood into the right atrium.
