= Monte Cristo, Sierra County, California =

Monte Cristo, California
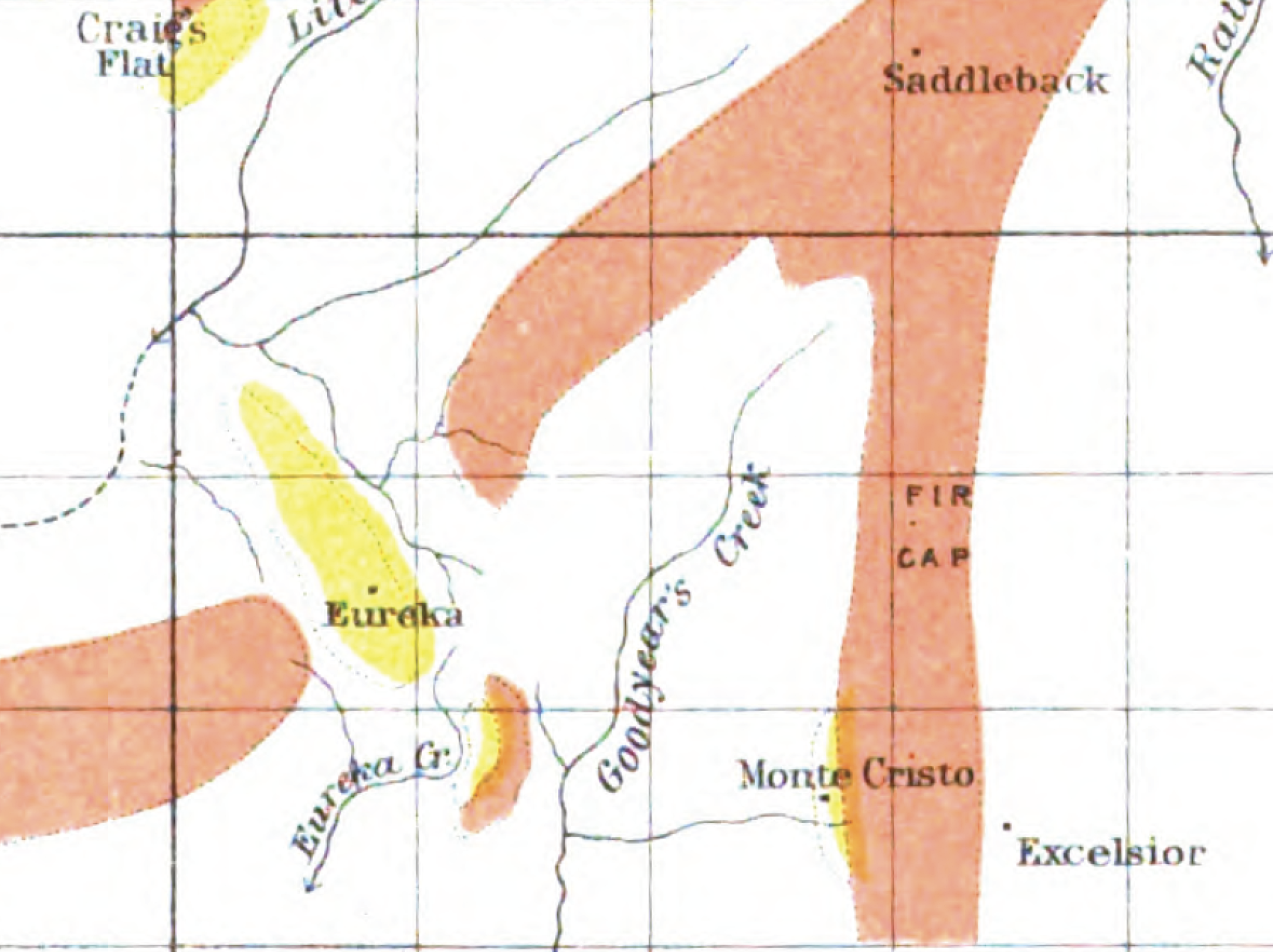
- Monte Cristo Mine in Sierra County

- Location in California Monte Cristo, California (the United States)
- Coordinates: 39°35′47″N 120°51′27″W
- Country: United States
- State: California
- County: Sierra Nevada
- Time zone: UTC-8 (Pacific Standard Time)
  - Summer (DST): UTC-7 (Pacific Daylight Time)
- Area code: 530

Monte Cristo was a mining camp in Sierra County in the U.S. state of California, near California State Route 49 and Downieville. Monte Cristo can be reached by trails from Downieville. One of the main trails is at the ridge between Goodyears Creek and the North Fork of the North Yuba River. There are views of the Excelsior Mine on Goodyears Creek four miles northwest of Downieville near Monte Cristo. Goodyears Bar, California is nearby. The mines at Fir Cap, two miles from Monte Cristo, were once rich with gold.

== History ==
Monte Cristo was one of the richest mining camps from 1855 to 1860. In the 1859 election, almost one thousand votes were cast. Monte Cristo produced from the 1850s hundreds of thousands dollar's worth of gold.

On April 22, 1859, a landslide in Monte Cristo killed four people. On September 29, 1859 there was a major fire in Monte Cristo.

On February 28, 1860, the Sacramento Daily Union reported delegates from Monte Cristo for the Democratic State Convention. Mining claims were made along the Goodyears Creek, as well as a half-dozen mining tunnels.

There were several businesses in Monte Cristo, including a saloon, drug and variety store, an attorney's office, a physician and surgeon and a butcher shop, among others.

Mining continued to be active through the 1860s into the 1870s at Monte Cristo. Placer mining was the most prevalent mining. There are reports of miners at Monte Cristo in the 1900s as well. In 1903, the White Bear channel was discovered that ran to Monte Cristo. The Monte Cristo Company worked the channel taking out $200,000 worth of gold. In 1911, the Monte Cristo Gravel Mines Company took out gold from the gravel they excavated.

== Geography ==
The former Monte Cristo Mine is located 5,280 feet (1,610 m) above sea level at 39°35′46″N 120°51′28″W.

The White Bear channel runs through Saddleback Mountain and Fir Cap, passing through Cooper Ranch under Monte Cristo. The characteristics of the gravel of this channel is a large amount of clean white quartz boulders.
