= James Behr =

American composer

James Behr is an American pianist, composer, recording artist & educator.

== Biography ==
Pianist and composer James Behr is a graduate of The Juilliard School (MM and BM) and has performed throughout the U.S. Behr won first prize in the 2013 Bradshaw & Buono International Piano Competition featuring a solo performance at Carnegie Hall (Weill). He served as Classical Artist in Residence for The Florida Symphonic Pops (aka The Boca Raton Pops), performed on TV show "Talk of the Town," and was a featured soloist on radio, including WNYC and WXEL programs "Keyboard Artists" and "Morning Scherzo." A Steinway Artist and adjunct professor at Manhattan College, Behr has performed as solo pianist at Alice Tully Hall (Lincoln Center), The Chautauqua Festival, and as concerto soloist with The Virginia Symphony Orchestra, The Naples Philharmonic, The Miami City Ballet, and The North Miami Symphony. He received scholarship awards from Juilliard and The Chautauqua Music Festival. Behr was also a prizewinner in the Society of American Musicians Competition, IL; Cullowhee Music Festival Competition, NC; Boca Raton Music Guild Competition, FL; Five Towns Music Festival Competition, NY; and Chicago Music Club Piano Competition, IL.

Behr's original music includes symphonic works, his piano concerto, "Europa,"; four musicals ("The Count of Monte Cristo", "Dreamquest", "E-date" and "The Jungle Island"), R&B ballads, solo piano works, "Suite Memoirs" (new age piano), "Kaleidoscope Suite" (fusion rock/jazz) and "Prisms" (nu-jazz). His music was performed by The Gold Coast Orchestra and The Sinfonia Virtuosi Orchestra. Behr recorded several CD albums of his original works and Chopin. Among his recent works as a composer is the musical The Count Of Monte Cristo (James Behr musical) adapted from the classic novel by Alexandre Dumas.

His musical, E-date, was a prize winning finalist in the New York New Theatre Works Festival in 2014, where it appeared at the Off-Broadway Times Square Center. A composer/lyricist in the BMI Lehman Engel Musical Theatre Workshop in New York, he is a graduate of The Juilliard School (MM and BM), Northwestern University (B.A.) and City University of New York (J.D.).
