= The Count of Monte Cristo (James Behr musical) =

Musical theater work

The Count of Monte Cristo musical, book and music by James Behr, is adapted from the famous 1844 novel by Alexandre Dumas. The Count of Monte Cristo was awarded as Finalist in the New York Musical Theatre Festival, 2011. It was performed in its entirety at the Off-Broadway Bleecker Street Theater in New York in 2012 as part of the Planet Connections Theatre Festivity. The Count of Monte Cristo was also performed in part in New York in 2010 at the New York Off-Broadway Wings Theater during the 2010 West Village Musical Theatre Festival. It received the festival award for Best Musical Score. Stylistically, the musical has a sound associated with traditional Broadway musicals given that it is orchestrated and recorded with a 30-piece orchestra (i.e., strings, woodwinds and brass).
