= Linda Crist =

Dance notation expert

Linda Ann Crist (1944 - 8 March 2005) was a noted labanotation expert, documenting, writing, and teaching labanotation. Labanotation is a type of notation that captures dance movements on paper, similar to how musical notation captures musical performances. It allows for accurate reproduction of specific choreography by other dancers or dance troops at a later time.

Influential as teacher, author, and professional notator, Crist published 4 books and staged many reconstructions from labanotation. Her books are Ballet Center Work, threebythree, Ballet Barre Enchainements, and Ballet Barre and Center Combinations, the last published in either description or labanotation format. Her reconstructions include Bournonville's pas de deux from "Flower Festival at Genzano," which was selected for the 1986 ACDFA adjudication.

An Associate Emeritus Professor from the University of Iowa, where she taught for 27 years, she worked with such noted professionals as the Joffrey Ballet, Alwin Nikolais, and Jacques d'Amboise.
