= Crista Samaras =

Crista Samaras is an American former lacrosse player and coach. She played lacrosse at Princeton University, graduating in 1999, and is second on the all-time career goals and points lists. While at Princeton, Samaras was a two-time Ivy League Player of the Year as well as a three-time All American. After graduating, Samaras went on to win a gold medal in the 2001 IFWLA World Cup and a silver medal in the 2005 IFWLA World Cup.

== Princeton ==
Although Crista Samaras said she "barely made the qualifications" for attending Princeton, the athlete says she was accepted because "lacrosse was [her] hook." As a freshman in 1995, Samaras was Rookie of the Year. The following year she was All-American. In her last two years at Princeton, she was named All-American two more times and was also on the NCAA All-Tournament Team twice. She was also a two-time Ivy League Player of the Year. During her senior year, she received the Emily Goodfellow Award which is rewarded to a senior who “contributes to team unity, morale, spirit, and has demonstrated love of lacrosse and Princeton.” Before graduating in 1999 with her bachelor's in politics, Samaras set a record of 270 points during her career which has yet to be broken. Samaras said, "Princeton created roots for me in the idea that you totally embrace what you are fighting for.” After graduating, Samaras returned to Princeton to train for a day before competing in the 2001 World Cup to "get in touch with her roots."

== IFWLA World Cup: 2001 and 2005 ==
In order be prepared for the 2001 World Cup, Samaras trained for a day at each of the schools she attended and played lacrosse at. During the Semifinals in of the 2001 World Cup, Crista Samaras had two assists and three goals, which led to her receiving honors. In the 2001 IFWLA World Cup Finals, the United States defeated Australia 14-8. Samaras had an assist for team mate Flynn and also scored the final goal of the game. For the 2005 World Cup, Samaras prepared by having intense three-a-day training sessions. Samaras recalled how in the 2001 World Cup she was “wide-eyed and didn’t know the players as well.” When asked about the 2005 World Cup she said, “This experience will resonate more for me. It's in the U.S., it's in my hometown, and I know the players better." Although the competition was in her hometown, the U.S. lost to Australia 14-7.

== Career ==
Samaras was an assistant coach at Yale University in 2000 and 2001. Two years after leaving Yale, Samaras issued a patent for shallow pocket netting she designed for the head of a lacrosse stick. She also began designing clothing and other equipment for the sport including inaugurating the Warrior's Woman's line. Samaras runs three businesses which all promote lacrosse.
