= Crist (surname) =

Crist is a surname. Notable people with the surname include:

- Alice Guerin Crist (1876–1941), Australian poet, author and journalist
- Carole Crist (born 1969), American businesswoman
- Charlie Crist, American. politician, former Florida governor and member of the House of Representatives
- Chuck Crist (1951–2020), American football safety
- The Crist Brothers (Dave, born 1982, and Jake, born 1984), American professional wrestlers
- Dayne Crist (born 1989), American football quarterback
- George B. Crist, U.S. Marine Corps General, former Commander of Central Command
- Henry Crist (1764–1844), United States Representative from Kentucky
- John Crist, American comedian
- John Crist, American decathlete
- Judith Crist, U.S. film critic
- Linda Crist (1944–2005), labanotationist
- Myndy Crist, American actress
- Victor Crist, Republican member of the Florida Senate
