= François Mêlier =

French professor of medicine (1798–1866)

Professor François Mêlier
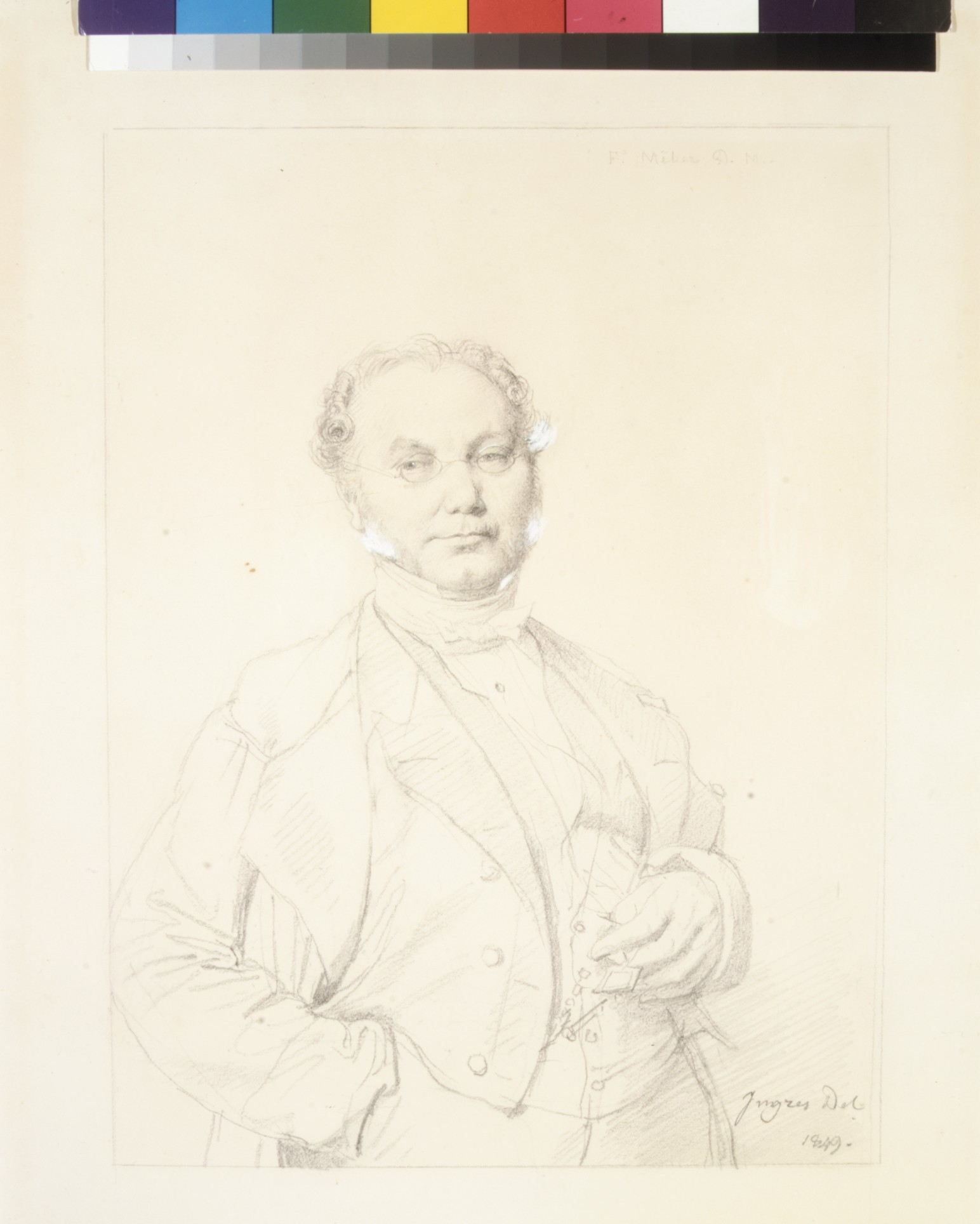
- François Mêlier par Ingres
- Born: 14 July 1798; Chasseneuil-sur-Bonnieure Charente, France
- Died: 16 September 1866 (aged 68); Marseille (Bouches-du-Rhône), France
- Medical career
- Field: Public health, hygiene

François Mêlier (14 July 1798 in Chasseneuil-sur-Bonnieure in Charente – 16 September 1866 in Marseille in the Bouches-du-Rhône) was a French professor of medicine, a precursor of public health.

== Biography ==
He studied at the Lycée impérial de Limoges and then at the Hôpital Saint-Alexis de Limoges, where he was appointed a resident in 1815.

In 1817, he enrolled in the Faculté de médecine de Paris where he obtained the double title of intern and hospital laureate. He passed his thesis on 19 June 1823. In 1827, he opened a course in political or public medicine at the Athénée royal de Paris, a title under which he combined public hygiene and forensic medicine. He combined the notions of contagion and contamination as well as prevention with isolation and hygiene rules. The Mêlier course was a great success and on 2 May 1843, he was elected to the Académie Nationale de Médecine.

In 1845, under the threat of a plague epidemic, Mêlier was asked by the Académie to publish a report in order to prevent the epidemic from reaching France. In August 1848, Mêlier was appointed a full member of the Higher Hygiene Committee and Charles Gilbert Tourret, Minister of Agriculture and Trade, entrusted him with the task of organising health councils in the departments. He went to Roubaix, then to Dunkirk where there was an epidemic of typhoid fever; in 1849, he went to the Somme to follow an epidemic of suet; called back to Paris by the outbreak of cholera, he received a mission from the minister to visit hospitals every day and report to him on the situation. He went to Roubaix, then to Dunkirk where there was an epidemic of typhoid fever; in 1849, he went to the Somme to follow an epidemic of suet; called back to Paris by the outbreak of cholera, he received a mission from the minister to visit hospitals and penitentiaries every day and report to him on the situation.

In 1850, following a local conflict, Dumas, Minister of Agriculture and Trade, appointed Mêlier as extraordinary Commissioner of the health service of Marseille and the entire Mediterranean coast, then in 1854, Inspector General of Sanitary Services. He had a new Lazaret installed on the Frioul archipelago, in the old hospital of Ratonneau.

Mêlier was at the origin of the first International Health Conference, of which he was reserved the right to take the top leadership. The first meeting of the conference took place on 27 July 1851; twelve countries had responded to the call of the French government.

In 1864, Mêlier was sent to Turin to prepare a health convention between France and Italy. In 1866, when cholera broke out in Amiens, he went there with the minister to organise relief. Finally, in August 1866, he left for Corsica with a mission to inspect the island's health service. On 2 September 1866 he returned to Marseille and found the minister there, to whom he reported on his mission. On 6 September, accompanied by the Director of Health, he went to the lazaret of Ratonneau in the oppressive heat; on the morning of the 7th he suffered a stroke and after regaining consciousness for a few days, on 14 September, his condition worsened and on 16 September Mêlier died.

== Honours ==
- Commander of the Legion of Honour
- Order of Saint Stanislaus
- Commander de l'Order of Saints Maurice and Lazarus
- Commander of the Order of Isabella the Catholic
- President of the Society of Medical Hydrology and Climatology (1853-1866)
- Member of the National Academy of Medicine (elected in 1843), then Annual Secretary (1846-1848) and President (in 1852)

== Works ==
- Essai sur le diagnostic médical (1823)
- Études sur les subsistances envisagées dans leurs rapports avec les maladies et la mortalité (1842)
- Expériences et observations sur les propriétés toxiques du sulfate de quinine (1843)
- Des affections intermittentes à courte période (1843)
- De la santé des ouvriers employés dans les manufactures de tabac (1845)
- Ouverture du lazaret de Ratoneau (1850)
- Relation de la fièvre jaune survenue à Saint-Nazaire en 1861, suivie d'une réponse aux discours prononcés dans le cours de la discussion, et de la loi anglaise sur les quarantaines (1863)
