= USS Philadelphia (CL-41) =

Brooklyn-class light cruiser

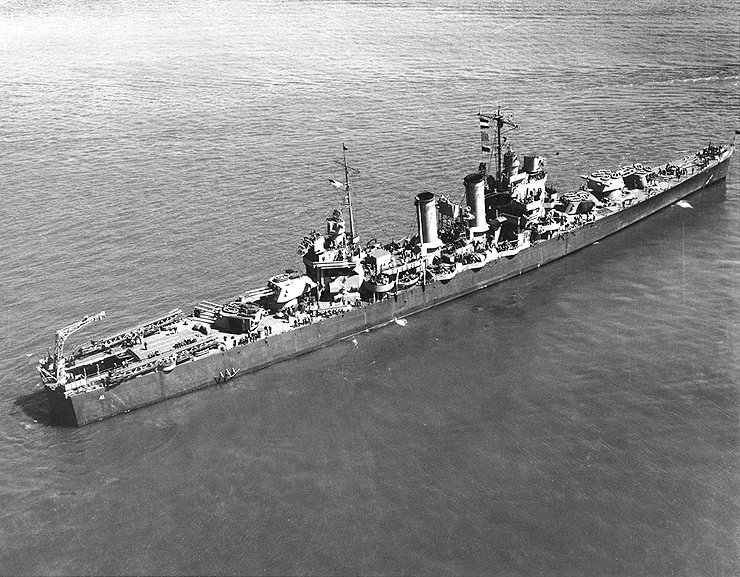
- USS Philadelphia (April 1943)

History

United States
- Name: Philadelphia
- Namesake: City of Philadelphia, Pennsylvania
- Ordered: 16 June 1933
- Awarded: 3 August 1933 (date assigned to ship yard); 1 November 1933 (beginning of construction period)
- Builder: Philadelphia Navy Yard, Philadelphia, Pennsylvania
- Laid down: 28 May 1935
- Launched: 17 November 1936
- Sponsored by: Mrs. George H. Earle
- Commissioned: 23 September 1937
- Decommissioned: 3 February 1947
- Stricken: 9 January 1951
- Identification: Hull symbol:CL-41; Code letters:NIJT
- Honors and awards: 5 × battle stars
- Fate: Sold to Brazil in 1951

History

Brazil
- Name: Barroso
- Namesake: Francisco Manuel Barroso, Baron of Amazonas
- Acquired: 9 January 1951
- Decommissioned: 15 May 1973
- Identification: C-11
- Fate: Scrapped in 1974

General characteristics (as built)
- Class & type: Brooklyn-class cruiser
- Displacement: 10,000 long tons (10,000 t) (estimated as design); 9,767 long tons (9,924 t) (standard); 12,207 long tons (12,403 t) (max)
- Length: 600 ft (180 m) oa; 608 ft 4 in (185.42 m) lwl
- Beam: 61 ft 7 in (18.77 m)
- Draft: 19 ft 9 in (6.02 m) (mean); 24 ft (7.3 m) (max)
- Installed power: 8 × Steam boilers; 100,000 shp (75,000 kW)
- Propulsion: 4 × geared turbines; 4 × screws
- Speed: 32.5 kn (37.4 mph; 60.2 km/h)
- Complement: 868 officers and enlisted
- Armament: 15 × 6 in (150 mm)/47 caliber Mark 16 guns (5x3); 8 × 5 in (130 mm)/25 caliber anti-aircraft guns; 8 × caliber 0.50 in (13 mm) machine guns
- Armor: Belt: 3 1/4–5 in (83–127 mm); Deck: 2 in (51 mm); Barbettes: 6 in (150 mm); Turrets: 1 1/4–6 in (32–152 mm); Conning tower: 2 1/4–5 in (57–127 mm)
- Aircraft carried: 4 × floatplanes
- Aviation facilities: 2 × stern catapults

General characteristics (1945)
- Beam: 69 ft (21 m) (with blisters)
- Armament: 15 × 6 in (150 mm)/47 caliber guns (5x3); 8 × 5 in (130 mm)/25 caliber anti-aircraft guns; 6 × quad 40 mm (1.6 in) Bofors anti-aircraft guns; 2 × twin 40 mm (1.6 in) Bofors anti-aircraft guns; 18 × single 20 mm (0.79 in) Oerlikon anti-aircraft cannons

USS Philadelphia (CL-41) was a Brooklyn-class light cruiser of the United States Navy. She was the fifth ship named for Philadelphia, Pennsylvania. In 1951, she was sold to Brazil and commissioned into the Brazilian Navy as Almirante Barroso.

== Construction and commissioning ==
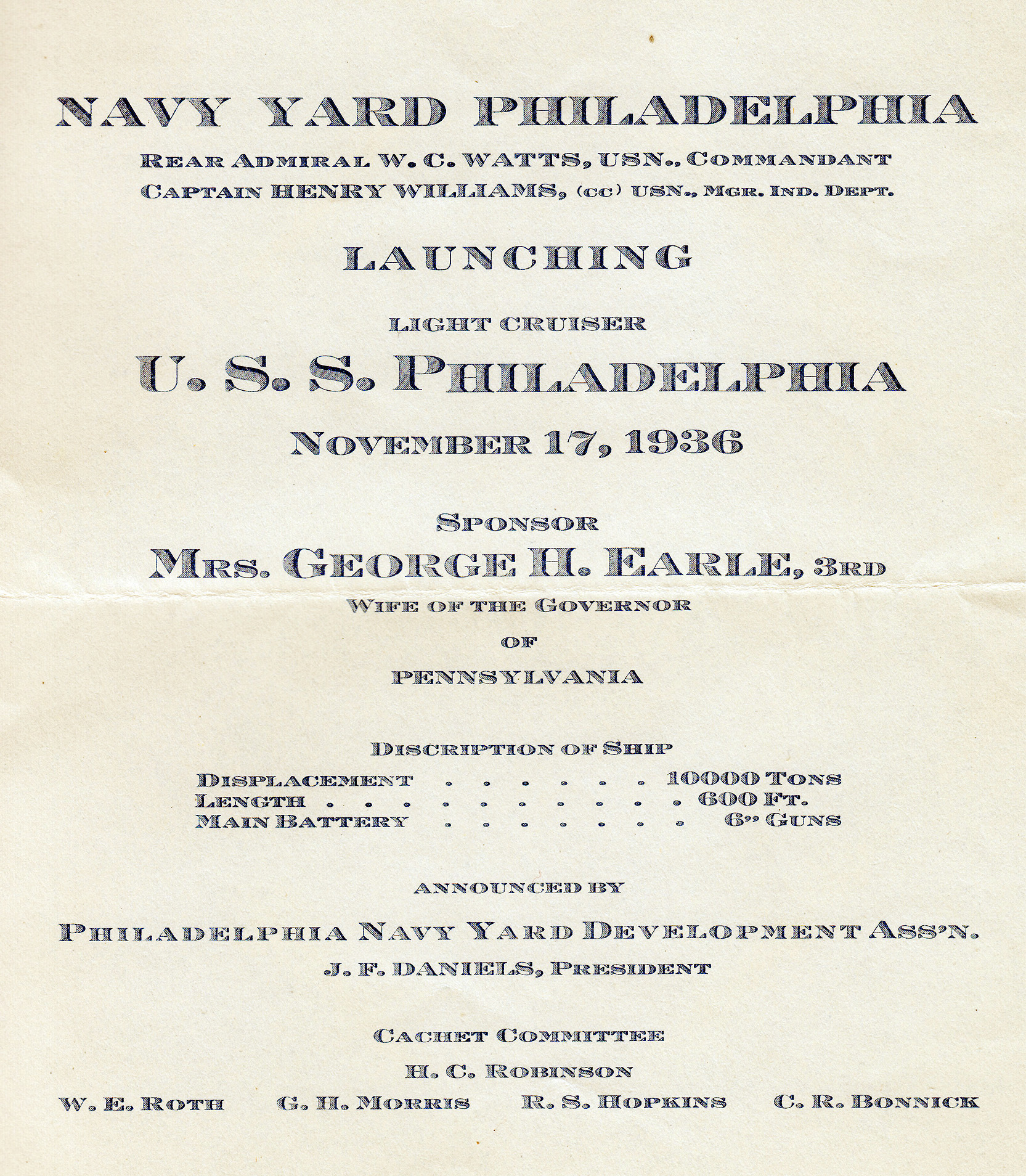
Launching announcement

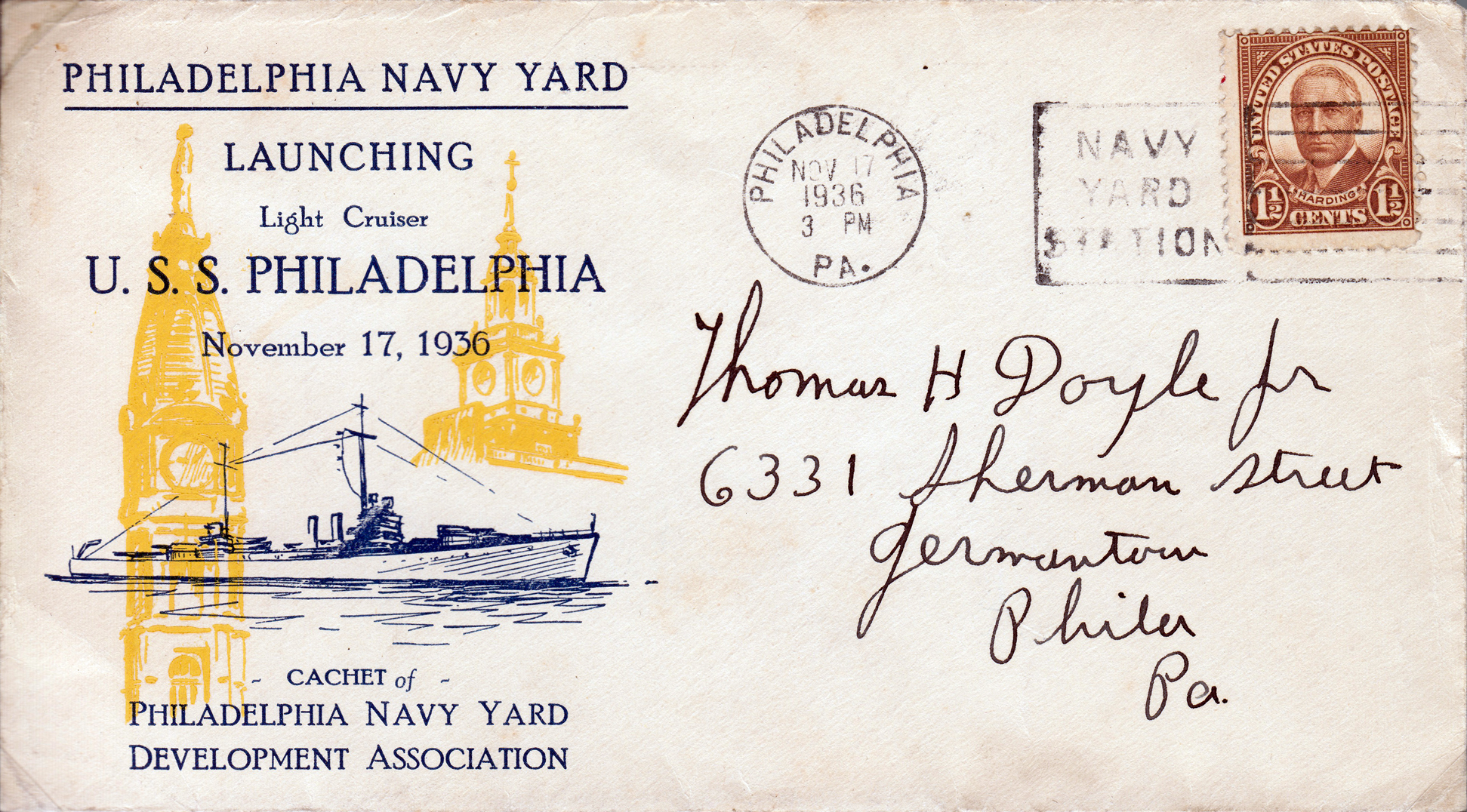
Commemorative cover

Philadelphia was laid down on 28 May 1935 at the Philadelphia Navy Yard; launched on 17 November 1936; sponsored by Mrs. Huberta F. Earle (née Potter), first lady of Pennsylvania and wife of Governor George H. Earle III; and commissioned at Philadelphia on 23 September 1937, Captain Jules James in command.

== United States Navy ==
=== Inter-war period ===
After fitting out, the cruiser departed Philadelphia on 3 January 1938 for shakedown in the West Indies (Barbados, Jamaica, and Cuba) before heading north to the Royal Naval Dockyard at the British Imperial fortress colony of Bermuda, the home base of the Royal Navy's America and West Indies Station 640 miles off North Carolina, where the ship's officers were hosted to lunch by Captain-in-Charge HM Dockyard, Captain Henry Bradford Maltby, and the dockyard cinema presented a special show for the crew. Captain James, selected other officers and US Consul Harold L. Williamson, was entertained at Government House by the governor and general officer commanding-in-chief, General Sir Reginald John Thoroton Hildyard. Captain James was also the guest of honour at a tea-dance held by the US Consul, where he was presented to more than 350 local naval, military and civil dignitaries, including Governor and Lady Hildyard, at the Princess Hotel. With the onset of the Second World War the following year, secret negotiations between the British and US governments would lead to Britain granting the United States leases for a Naval Operating Base and Kindley Field (this agreement would later be grouped with the exchange of base rights in other British territories for destroyers in the Destroyers-for-bases deal, although the bases in Bermuda and Newfoundland were granted freely), with Captain James being given command of the Naval Operating Base. The return to the US of Philadelphia from Bermuda was followed by additional alterations at Philadelphia and further sea trials off the Maine coast.

Philadelphia called at Charleston, South Carolina, on 30 April and hosted President Franklin Delano Roosevelt the first week of May for a cruise in Caribbean waters. The president debarked at Charleston on 8 May, and Philadelphia resumed operations with Cruiser Division 8 (CruDiv 8) off the Atlantic coast. She was designated flagship of Rear Admiral Forde A. Todd, Commander CruDiv 8 (ComCruDiv 8), Battle Force on 27 June. In the following months, she called at principal ports of the West Indies, and at New York City, Boston, and Norfolk, Virginia.

Transiting the Panama Canal on 1 June 1939, Philadelphia joined CruDiv 8 in San Pedro, California, on 18 June for Pacific coastal operations. She departed Los Angeles, California, on 2 April 1940 for Pearl Harbor, where she engaged in fleet maneuvers until May 1941.

In September 1940, fifteen of the ship's African American mess men wrote an open letter to a newspaper protesting the treatment of African Americans in the Navy. "We sincerely hope to discourage any other colored boys who might have planned to join the Navy and make the same mistake we did. All they would become is seagoing bell hops, chambermaids and dishwashers," they wrote. On publication of the letter, the fifteen were confined to the brig. They were later dishonorably discharged. The incident drew protests from hundreds of mess men on other ships as well as anger in the African American community, and led to a series of meetings between Roosevelt and NAACP leaders A. Philip Randolph and Walter White to discuss partial desegregation of the armed forces.

Philadelphia stood out of Pearl Harbor on 22 May 1941 to resume Atlantic operations, arriving Boston on 18 June. At this point, she commenced Neutrality Patrol operations, steaming as far south as Bermuda and as far north as Halifax, Nova Scotia. She entered Boston Navy Yard on 25 November for upkeep, and was in repair status there when the Japanese attacked Pearl Harbor.

=== World War II ===
==== 1942 ====
11 days after the Japanese attack, Philadelphia steamed for exercises in Casco Bay, after which she joined two destroyers for anti-submarine patrol to NS Argentia, Newfoundland. Returning to New York on 14 February 1942, she made two escort runs to Hafnarfjörður, Iceland. She then joined units of Task Force 22 (TF 22) at Norfolk on 16 May, departing two days later for an anti-submarine warfare sweep to the Panama Canal.

She then returned to New York, only to depart on 1 July as an escort unit for a convoy bound for Greenock, Scotland. The middle of August found her escorting a second convoy to Greenock. Returning to Norfolk on 15 September, she joined Rear Admiral H. Kent Hewitt’s Western Naval Task Force.

This force was to land some 35,000 troops and 250 tanks of General George Patton's Western Task Force at three different points on the Atlantic coast of French Morocco. Philadelphia became flagship of Rear Admiral Lyal A. Davidson, commanding the Southern Attack Group. which was to carry 6,423 troops under Major General Ernest N. Harmon, with 108 tanks, to the landing at Safi, Morocco, about 140 mi (220 km) south of Casablanca.

Philadelphia's task group departed Norfolk on 24 October and set course as if bound for the British Isles. The entire Western Naval Task Force, consisting of 102 ships and spanning an ocean area some 20 × 40 mi (30 × 60 km), combined 450 mi (720 km) off Cape Race on 28 October. It was the greatest war fleet sent forth by the United States at the time.

The task force swept northward on 6 November, thence changed course toward the Straits of Gibraltar. But after dark, a southeasterly course was plotted towards Casablanca, and shortly before midnight on 7 November, three separate task groups closed three different points on the Moroccan coast.

Philadelphia took up its fire support station as the transports offloaded troops in the early morning darkness of 8 November. Shore batteries opened fire at 04:28, and within two minutes Philadelphia joined New York in bombardment of Batterie Railleuse which, with four 5.1 in (130 mm) guns, was the strongest defense unit in the Safi area. Later in the morning, Philadelphia bombarded a battery of three 6.1 in (155 mm) guns about 3 mi (5 km) south of Safi.

Spotter planes from the cruiser also got into the act by flying close support missions. One of Philadelphia's aircraft discovered and bombed a Vichy French submarine on 9 November in the vicinity of Cape Kantin. The next day, the Vichy submarine Medeuse, one of eight that had sortied from Casablanca, was sighted down by the stern and listing badly to port, beached at Mazagan, north of Cape Blanco. Thought to be the same submarine previously attacked off Cape Kantin, Medeuse was again spotted by a plane from Philadelphia and was subsequently bombed.

==== 1943 ====
Departing Safi on 13 November, Philadelphia returned to New York on 24 November. Operating from that port until 11 March 1943, she assisted in escorting two convoys to Casablanca. She then joined Rear Admiral Alan G. Kirk’s TF 85 for training in Chesapeake Bay preparatory to the invasion of Sicily.

A convoy escorted by Philadelphia and nine destroyers sortied from Norfolk on 8 June and arrived Oran, Algeria on 22 June, where final invasion staging operations took place. The convoy stood out from Oran on 5 July, and arrived off the beaches of Scoglitti, Sicily shortly before midnight of 9 July. Philadelphia assisted in furnishing covering bombardment as the troops of Major General Troy Middleton’s 45th Infantry Division stormed ashore. By 15 July, she had joined the gunfire support group off Porto Empedocle, where her guns were put to good use.

Philadelphia took departure from her gunfire support area on 19 July and steamed to Algiers, where she became flagship of Rear Admiral L. A. Davidson’s Support Force. This TF 88 was formed on 27 July and given the mission of the defense of Palermo, gunfire support to the Seventh Army’s advance along the coast, provision of amphibious craft for "leap frog" landings behind enemy lines, and ferry duty for heavy artillery, supplies, and vehicles to relieve congestion on the railway and the single coastal road. Philadelphia, Savannah, and six destroyers entered the harbor at Palermo on 30 July and the next day commenced bombardment of the batteries near Santo Stefano di Camastra.

Action in the area of Palermo continued until 21 August, when Philadelphia steamed for Algiers. During her operations in support of the invasion of Sicily, the cruiser had provided extensive gunfire support and, in beating off several hostile air attacks, had splashed a total of six aircraft. She touched at Oran, departing on 5 September en route to Salerno.

Her convoy entered the Gulf of Salerno a few hours before midnight of 8 September 1943. Philadelphia's real work began off the Salerno beaches at 09:43 the next day, when she commenced shore bombardment. When one of her scouting planes spotted 35 German tanks concealed in a thicket adjacent to Red Beach, Philadelphia's guns took them under fire and destroyed seven of them before they escaped to the rear.

Philadelphia narrowly evaded a KG 100-launched glide bomb on 11 September, although several of her crew were injured when the bomb exploded. While bombarding targets off Aropoli on 15 September, the cruiser downed one of 12 attacking planes and assisted in driving off a second air attack the same day in the vicinity of Altavilla. She downed two more hostile aircraft on 17 September and cleared the gunfire support area that night, bound for Bizerte, Tunisia. After upkeep at Gibraltar, Philadelphia departed Oran, Algeria on 6 November as part of the escort for a convoy which arrived at Hampton Roads on 21 November.

==== 1944 ====
Philadelphia underwent overhaul at New York and then engaged in refresher training in Chesapeake waters until 19 January 1944, when she steamed from Norfolk as an escorting unit for a convoy arriving Oran, Algeria on 30 January.

Philadelphia joined the gunfire support ships off Anzio on 14 February and provided support for the advancing ground troops through 23 May. On this same day she collided with the USS Laub (DD-613). She then sailed to the British naval yard at Malta, where repairs to her bow were effected. After overhaul at Malta, she joined Admiral C. F. Bryant’s Task Group 85.12 (TG 85.12) at Taranto, Italy. The cruiser served as one of the escorting units for the group, which reached the Gulf of Saint-Tropez, France, on 15 August. At 0640, she teamed with Texas and Nevada and, with other support ships, they closed the beaches and provided counter-battery fire. By 0815, the bombardment had destroyed enemy defenses, and Major General William W. Eagles’ famed "Thunderbirds" of the 45th Army Infantry Division landed without opposition.

After replenishing ammunition at Propriano, Corsica, on 17 August, Philadelphia provided gunfire support to the French army troops on the western outskirts of Toulon. Four days later, her commanding officer, Captain Walter A. Ansel, accepted the surrender of the fortress islands of Pomeques, Château d'If, and Ratonneau in the Bay of Marseille. After gunfire support missions off Nice, she departed Naples on 20 October and returned to Philadelphia, Pa., arriving on 6 November.

==== 1945 ====
Philadelphia underwent overhaul at the Philadelphia Navy Yard and then refresher training in the West Indies, returning to Norfolk, Virginia, on 4 June 1945. She steamed for Antwerp, Belgium on 7 July, acting as escort for Augusta which had embarked President Harry S. Truman and his party, including Secretary of State James F. Byrnes and Fleet Admiral William D. Leahy. Arriving Antwerp on 15 July, the president departed Augusta and was flown to the Potsdam Conference. Before the conference ended, Philadelphia proceeded to Plymouth, England, to await return of the president.

On 2 August, Philadelphia rendered honors to King George VI, who visited President Truman aboard Augusta. The ships departed that same day and Philadelphia arrived Norfolk, Virginia, on 7 August.

=== Post-war ===
Philadelphia stood out of Narragansett Bay for Southampton, England, on 6 September, returning on 25 September as escort for the former German liner Europa. After operations in Narragansett Bay and in Chesapeake Bay, she arrived Philadelphia on 26 October. Steaming for Le Havre, France, on 14 November, she embarked Army passengers for the return to New York on 29 November. She made another "Magic Carpet" run from New York to Le Havre and return from 5 to 25 December, and arrived at Philadelphia for inactivation on 9 January 1946.

== Brazilian Navy ==
Philadelphia decommissioned in the Philadelphia Navy Yard on 3 February 1947. Struck from the Naval Vessel Register on 9 January 1951, she was sold to the government of Brazil under terms of the Mutual Defense Assistance Program. She served in the Brazilian Navy under the name Barroso (C–11) and was scrapped in 1974.

== Awards ==
- European–African–Middle Eastern Campaign Medal with five battle stars for World War II service
