= USS Davidson =

United States Navy Cold War-era destroyer escort/frigate

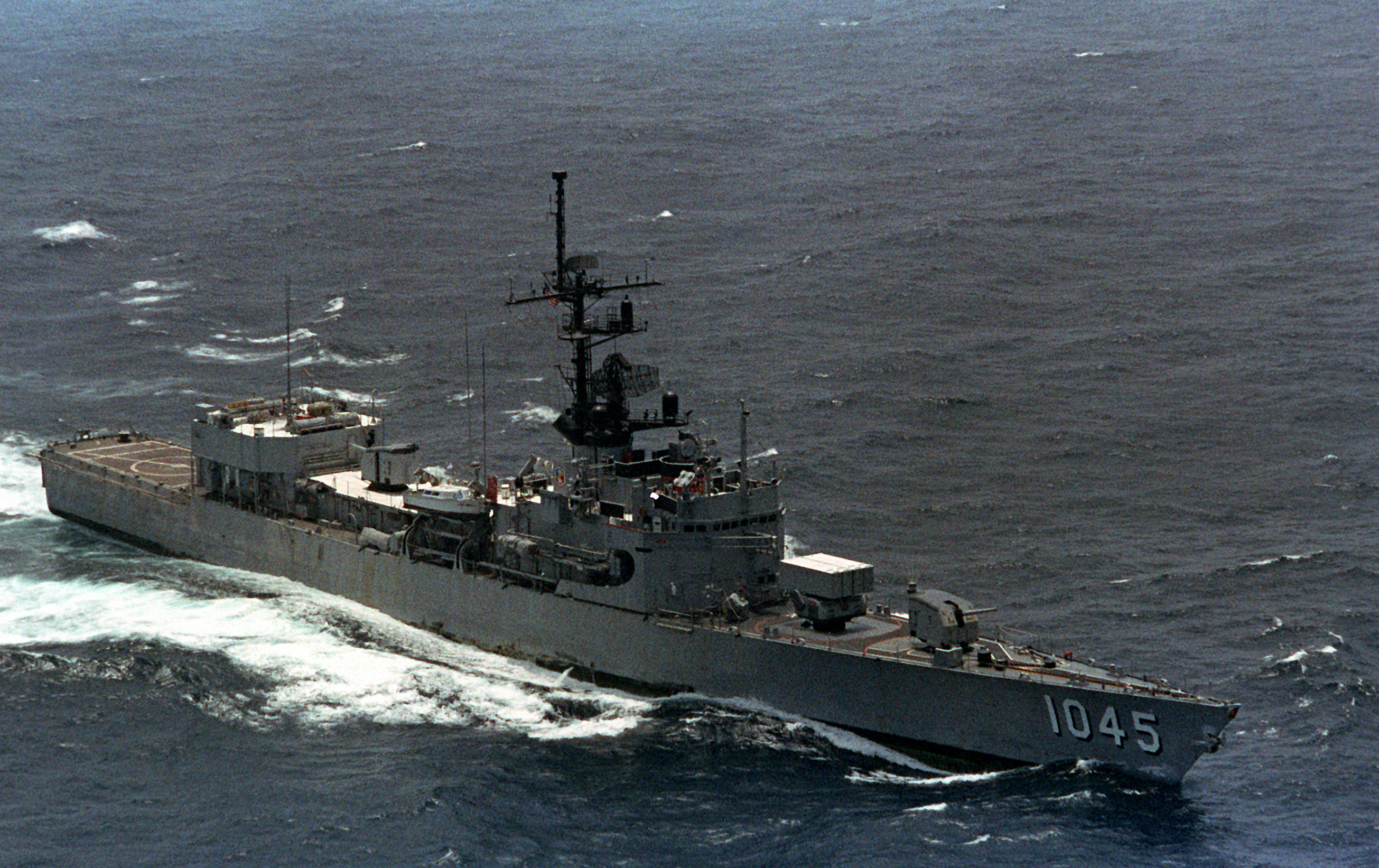
- USS Davidson in 1983

History

United States
- Name: Davidson
- Ordered: 3 January 1962
- Builder: Avondale Shipyards
- Laid down: 30 September 1963
- Launched: 2 October 1964
- Acquired: 16 November 1965
- Commissioned: 1 December 1965
- Decommissioned: 8 December 1988
- Stricken: 24 January 2001
- Identification: DE-1045 (1965); FF-1045 (1975)
- Fate: Transferred to Brazil

Brazil
- Name: Paraiba
- Commissioned: 25 July 1989
- Decommissioned: 26 July 2002
- Identification: D28
- Fate: Sank in early 2005

General characteristics
- Class & type: Garcia-class frigate
- Displacement: 3,403 tons
- Length: 415 ft (126 m)
- Beam: 44 ft (13 m)
- Draft: 25 ft (7.6 m)
- Propulsion: Steam turbines
- Complement: Officers: 20; enlisted: 245

USS Davidson (FF-1045) was a Garcia-class destroyer escort, and later a frigate, in the United States Navy. She was named for Vice Admiral Lyal A. Davidson. Davidson was commissioned with the US Navy from 1965 to 1988 and served with the Brazilian Navy from 1989 to 2002. Davidson sank while under tow to be scrapped in India circa 2005.

== History ==
The keel for USS Davidson was laid down 30 September 1963 at Avondale Shipyards. The ship was launched and christened 2 October 1964, with Mrs. Lyal A. Davidson, widow of the ship's namesake, as ship sponsor. Davidson was commissioned on 7 December 1965 in Charleston, South Carolina. She was homeported in Pearl Harbor. She deployed to the Western Pacific in support of the Vietnam War. She was redesignated, along with the rest of her class, as a frigate in 1975 with the new hull number FF-1045.

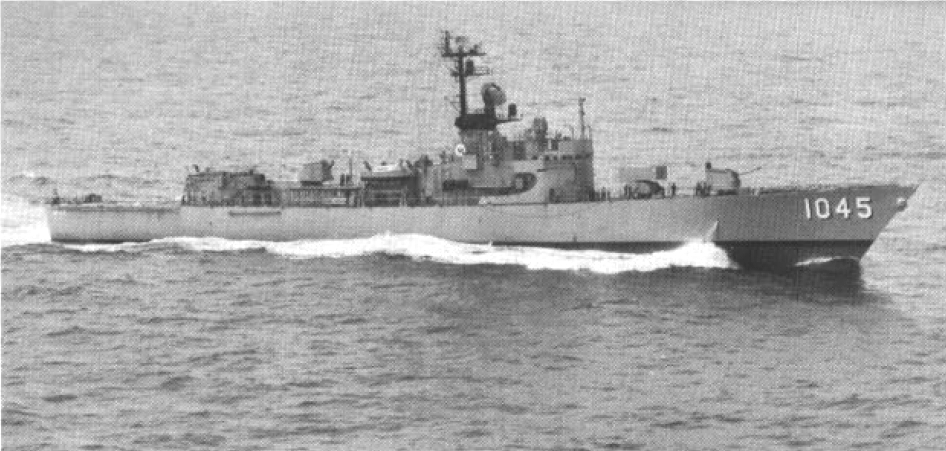
Davidson in 1967, before addition of the helicopter hangar.

Davidson deployed from Pearl Harbor on her first Western Pacific cruise on 18 April 1967. The ship made port calls to Yokosuka, Japan, Chinhae, Korea, Sasebo, Japan, Subic Bay, Philippines, Hong Kong, Bang Saen, Thailand and Bangkok, Thailand. The ship served in the waters off Vietnam supporting aircraft carriers at Yankee Station and providing naval gunfire support elsewhere off the coast. Davidson returned to Pearl Harbor 23 October 1967.

Davidson departed Pearl Harbor on 23 July 1982. The ship made port calls to Maizuru, Japan, Sasebo, Japan, Pusan, Korea, Subic Bay, Philippines, Tacloban, Philippines, Sattihip, Thailand, Hong Kong and Kagoshima, Japan. Davidson returned to Pearl harbor 28 January 1983.

== Military awards and honors ==
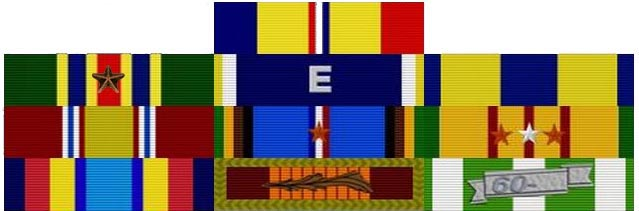

Unit awards and campaign medals	Eligibility dates
Armed Forces Expeditionary Medal	19–27 Apr 1969, 20 Sep-5 Oct 1971
Combat Action Ribbon	26 Apr 72
Meritorious Unit Commendation	24 Oct 1968 – 2 May 1969, 17 Apr-4 Nov 1972
Republic of Vietnam Meritorious Unit Citation (Gallantry Cross Medal Color With Palm)	11–15 Jan 1969, 03–16 Apr 1969
Vietnam Service Medal	1967: 22–31 May, 03-06 Jun, 13–28 Jun, 19–31 Jul, 08-19 Aug, 11 Sep-6 Oct; 1968: 02–15 Nov, 28 Nov-19 Dec; 1969: 05–21 Jan, 06 Feb-22 Mar, 02-16 Apr; 1970: 13 Jun-3 Jul, 12–28 Jul, 19 Aug – 3 Sep, 11–13 Sep, 26 Sep-14 Oct; 1971: 28 Jul-9 Aug, 17 Aug-2 Sep, 12–28 Nov; 1972: 26 Apr-22 May, 01 Jun-15 Jul, 28 Jul-26 Aug, 09 Sep-19 Oct.
Navy Expeditionary Medal	26 Apr-4 Aug 1980
Navy "E" Ribbon	1 Jan 1982 – 30 Jun 1983

== Brazilian service ==
On 8 December 1988, Davidson was decommissioned. She was transferred to Brazil and commissioned 25 July 1989 as Paraiba (D28). She was decommissioned from the Brazilian Navy on 26 July 2002.

She sank as she was being towed to India to be scrapped, along with the former Sample.
