= Lyal A. Davidson =

United States Navy admiral

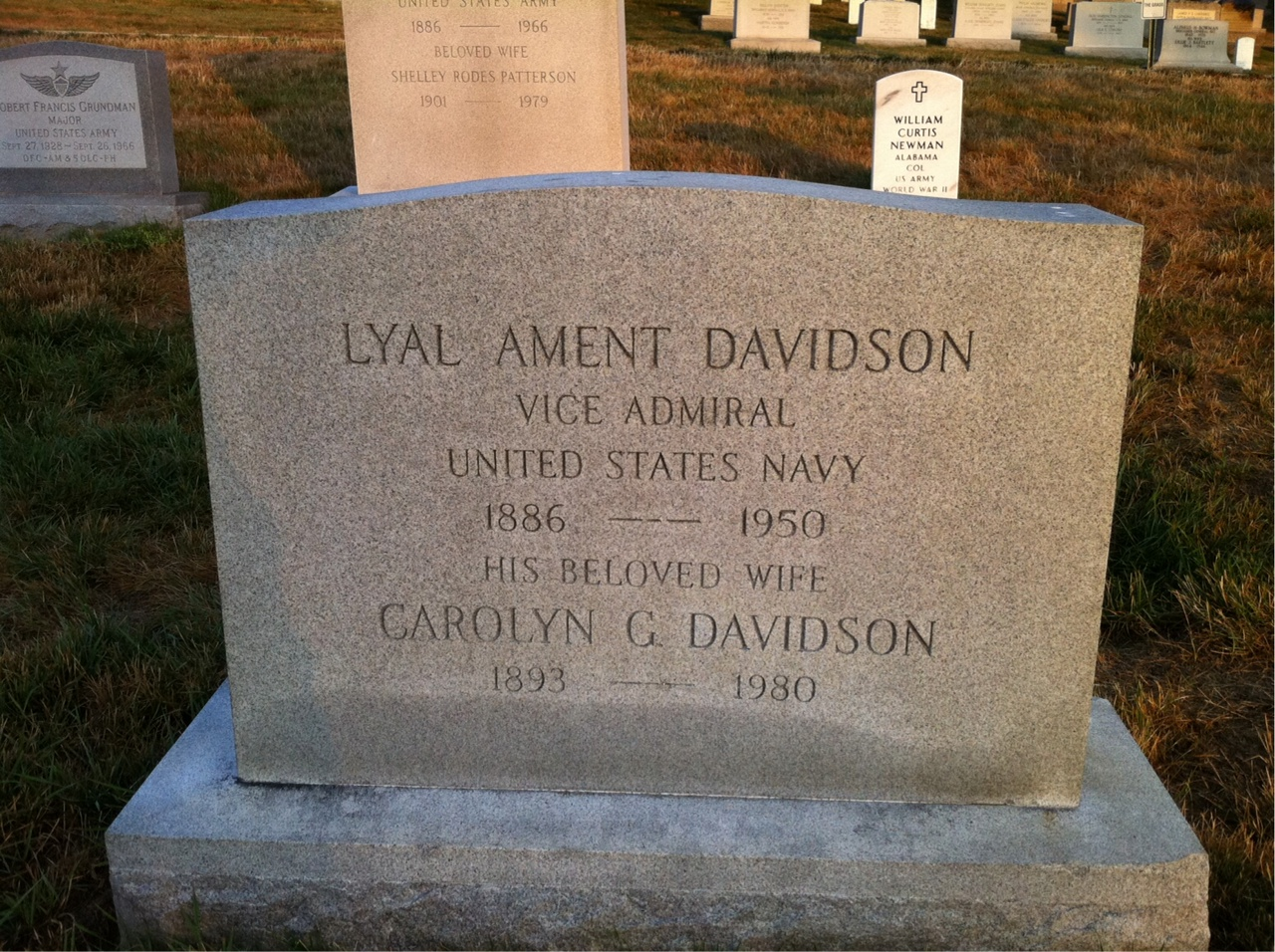
- Grave at Arlington National Cemetery
- Born: Lyal Ament Davidson; 2 December 1886; Muscatine, Iowa, U.S.
- Died: 29 December 1950 (aged 64); Bethesda, Maryland, U.S.
- Burial place: Arlington National Cemetery
- Spouse: Carolyn G. Davidson (1893–1980)
- Military career
- Allegiance: United States of America
- Branch: United States Navy
- Service years: 1912–1946
- Rank: Vice admiral
- Conflicts: World War I World War II
- Awards: Navy DSM (2) Legion of Merit (2)

Lyal Ament Davidson (2 December 1886 – 29 December 1950) was a Vice admiral of the United States Navy who served in World War I and World War II. He was a two time recipient of the Navy Distinguished Service Medal and the Legion of Merit. He was also the namesake of USS Davidson (FF-1045).

== Biography ==
Lyal Ament Davidson was born 2 December 1886 in Muscatine, Iowa to Colonel Joseph T. Davidson (US Army) and Judith (Ament) Davidson. After attending Muscatine High School, he was appointed a Midshipman in 1906. He graduated from the United States Naval Academy in 1910 and was commissioned as an Ensign in 1912, after two years at sea.

Assigned to USS New Hampshire (BB-25), Davidson received a commendation for service while on the landing force during the Battle of Vera Cruz in 1914.

During World War II, Davidson took command of Cruiser Division 8 using USS Philadelphia (CL-41) as his flagship. He received one Navy Distinguished Service Medal for his leadership during the November 1942 invasion of North Africa, in Morocco.

He received a Legion of Merit for command of a task force during the invasion of Italy in 1943.

He received a second Navy Distinguished Service Medal for command of Task Force 86, aboard USS Augusta (CA-31), during the 1944 invasion of Southern France.

He received a second Legion of Merit for his meritorious service in World War II.

After October 1944, he served in the office of the Chief of Naval Operations and then the State-War-Navy Coordinating Committee. He retired as a Vice Admiral in June 1946 and lived in Washington DC. Davidson died after a lengthy illness at Bethesda Naval Hospital on 29 December 1950. He was survived by his wife and three children. He was buried at Arlington National Cemetery on 4 January 1951, section 2, grave 4695-A. His wife Carolyn was buried there as well, after her death in 1980.

== Awards and honors ==
- Distinguished Service Medal (United States Navy) (2)
- Legion of Merit (2)
- Honorary Companion of the Order of the Bath (CB), United Kingdom
- Legion of Honour, France
- On 7 December 1965, USS Davidson (FF-1045) was commissioned and was named in his honor.
