= Frioul Archipelago =

French archipelago off the coast of Marseille

Coordinates: 43°16′30″N 5°18′0″E

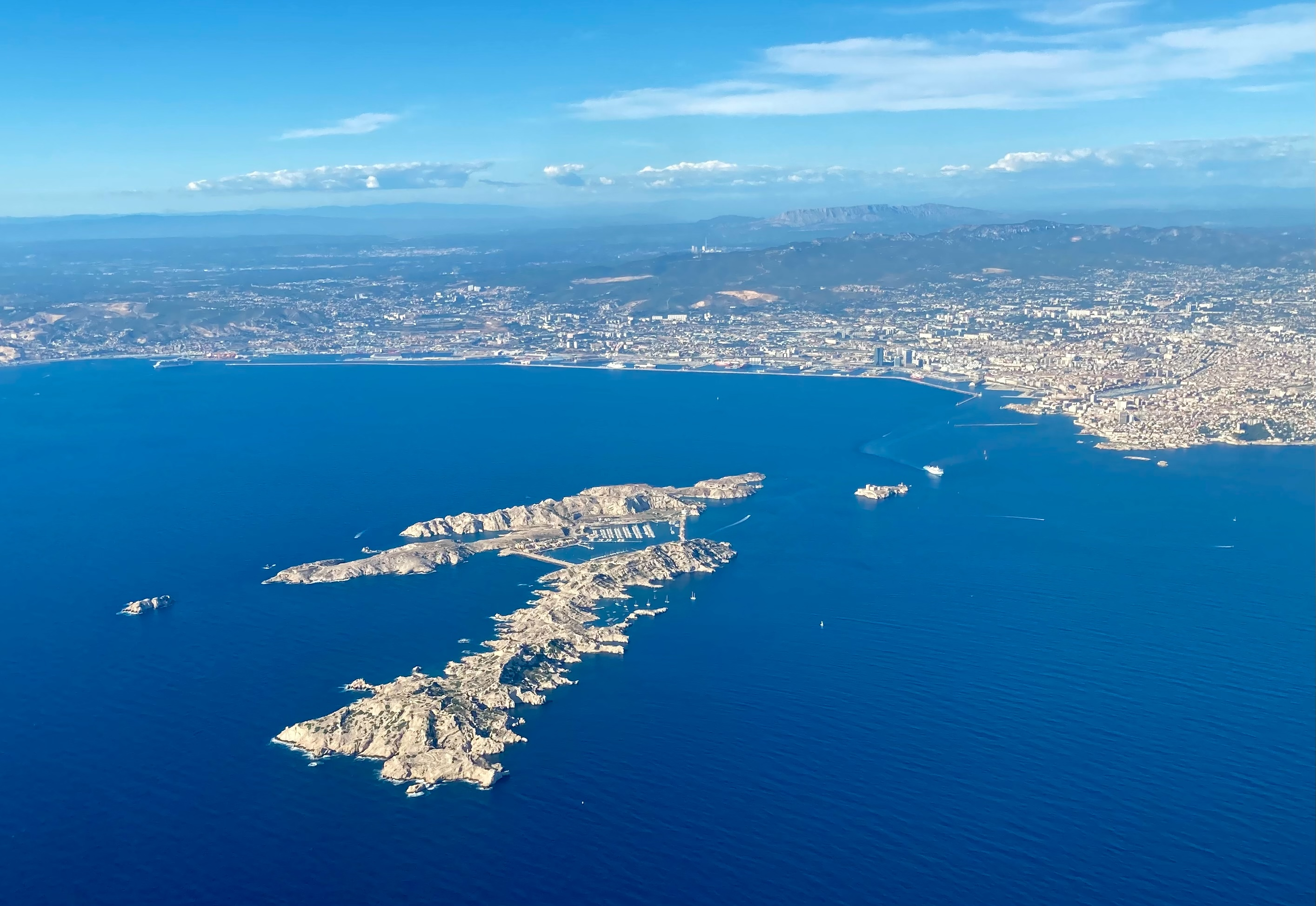
The Frioul Archipelago, with Marseille in the background

The Frioul Archipelago (French: Archipel du Frioul or Îles du Frioul; Occitan: Arxipèla de Friòl) is a group of four islands located off the Mediterranean coast of France, approximately 4 kilometres (2 miles) from Marseille. They form part of the city's 7th arrondissement. The islands of the archipelago cover a total land area of approximately 200 hectares. According to the 2015 census, the population was 146 (in 2021, 28 hab. were listed for Pomègues Island).

It is best known for the Château d'If on If Island.

== Island list ==
Island	Length	Height	Notes
Pomègues	2.7 km (1.7 mi) long	89 m (292 ft) high	The largest of the islands. The island consists of a port on the southeast side, named Port de Pomègues. Pytheas of Massalia noted the existence of a polar ice cap from this island.
Ratonneau	2.5 km (1.6 mi) long	89 m (292 ft) high	
If			Site of the Château d'If, where main fictional character in Alexandre Dumas, père's The Count of Monte Cristo was imprisoned.
Tiboulen du Frioul or Îlot Tiboulen		30 m (98 ft) high	Meaning "In front of the city" in Provençal, after the Latin antipolitanus.

The islands of Pomègues and Ratonneau are connected by a mole, the Digue de Berry, built in 1822.
