= Ratonneau =

Island of the Frioul archipelago

Coordinates: 43°16′56″N 5°18′34″E

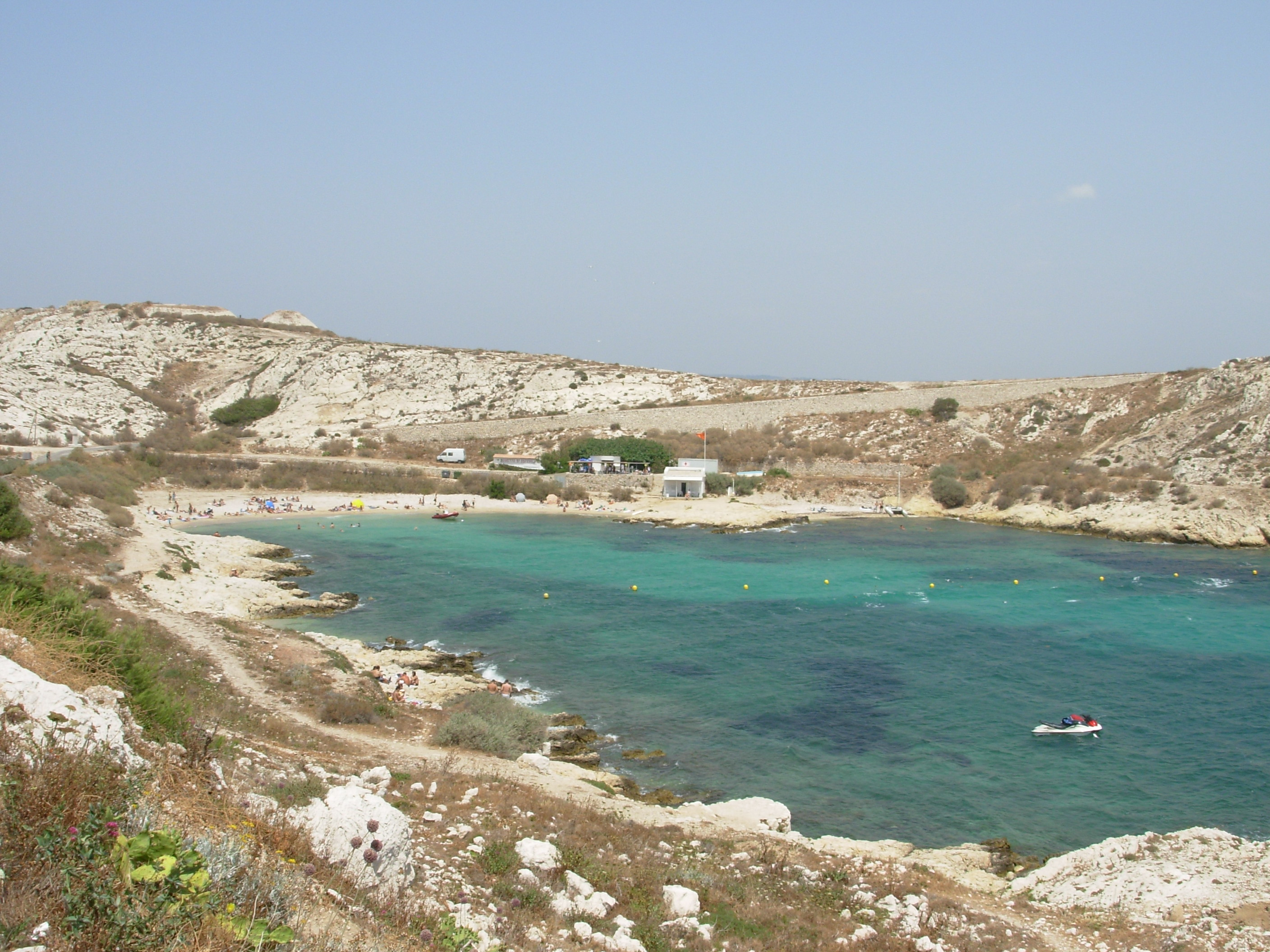
St Estève Beach, at the eastern end of the south side of Ratonneau.

Ratonneau is one of the islands of the Frioul archipelago in the Mediterranean Sea, off the southern coast of France near Marseille. It is relatively long and thin, approximately 2.5 km long but at most 500 m wide and generally much narrower. It is connected to the nearby island of Pomègues, which runs roughly parallel, by a mole constructed in 1822 to create a port area.

The Ancient Roman fleet that besieged Marseille in 49BC was moored by the island. Later, the island was used to quarantine foreign sailors, particularly those with cases of cholera and Leprosy. The neoclassical hôpital Caroline was constructed at the eastern end of the island in 1828 to a design by Michel-Robert Penchaud, but partly destroyed in bombing raids in the Second World War.

The centre of the island is occupied by a fort, with a smaller fort at its western tip. The smaller island of If lies to the south east.

It is part of the Calanques National Park. The island has several beaches. Today, the island is mostly visited by tourists, by ferries that connect the island to the Old Port of Marseille in the summer season. The island includes some tourist restaurants, some tourist shops, a fire station, and a town hall. Motor vehicles are banned.
