= Château d'If =

Fortress and prison near Marseille, France

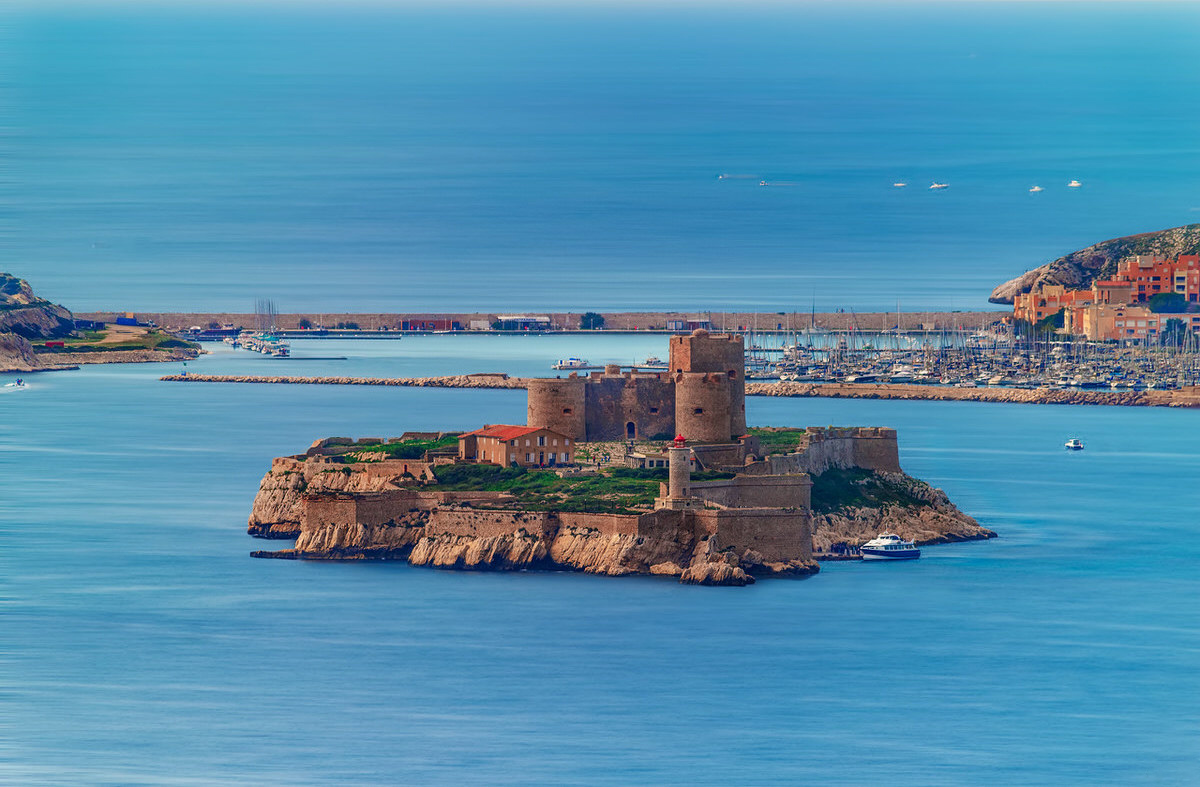

- Location within France
- Interactive map of the Château d'If area

General information
- Architectural style: Gothic Revival architecture
- Location: Île d'If, Bouches-du-Rhône, France
- Coordinates: 43°16′47.5″N 5°19′30.5″E
- Completed: 16th century

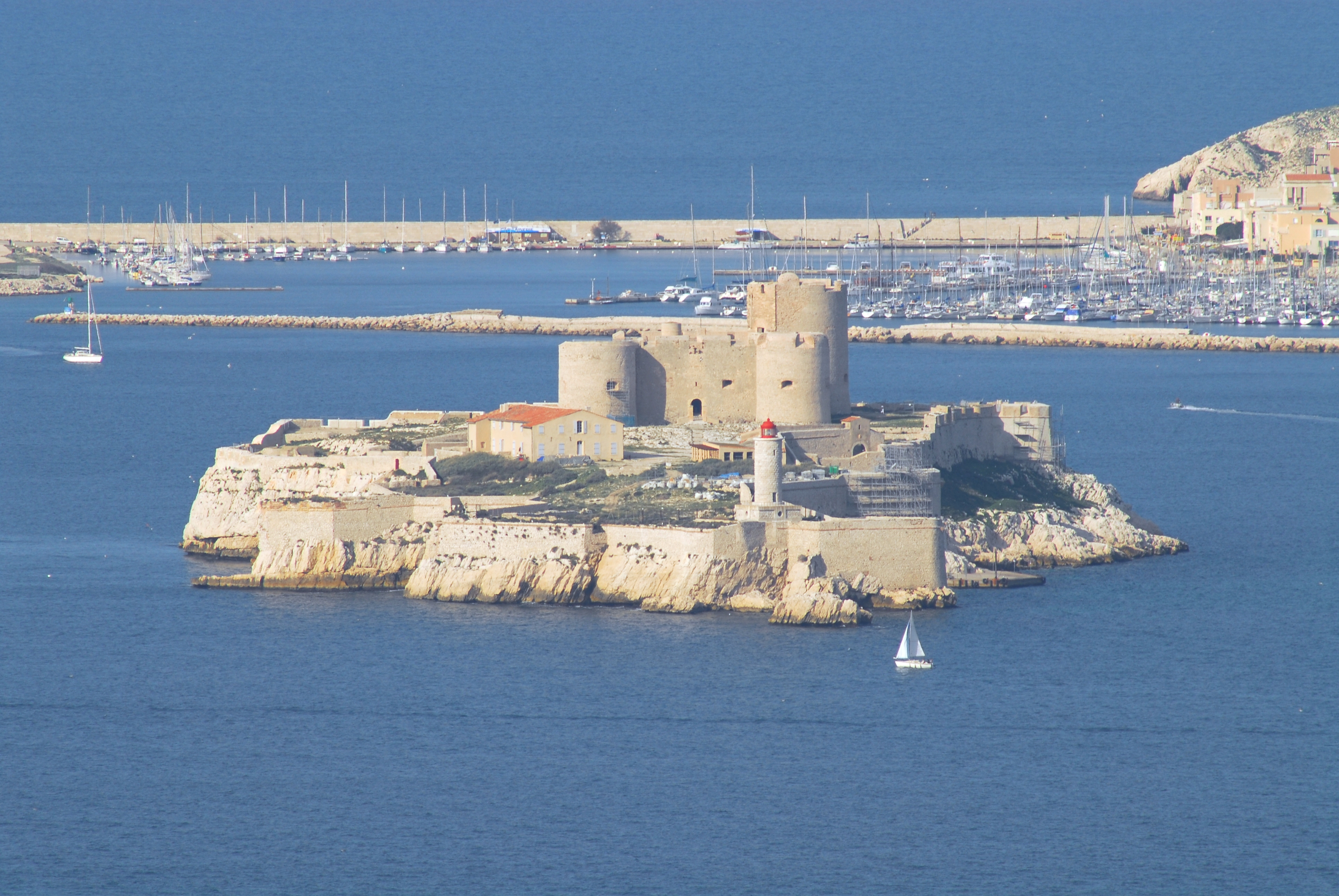
The Château d'If (close up)

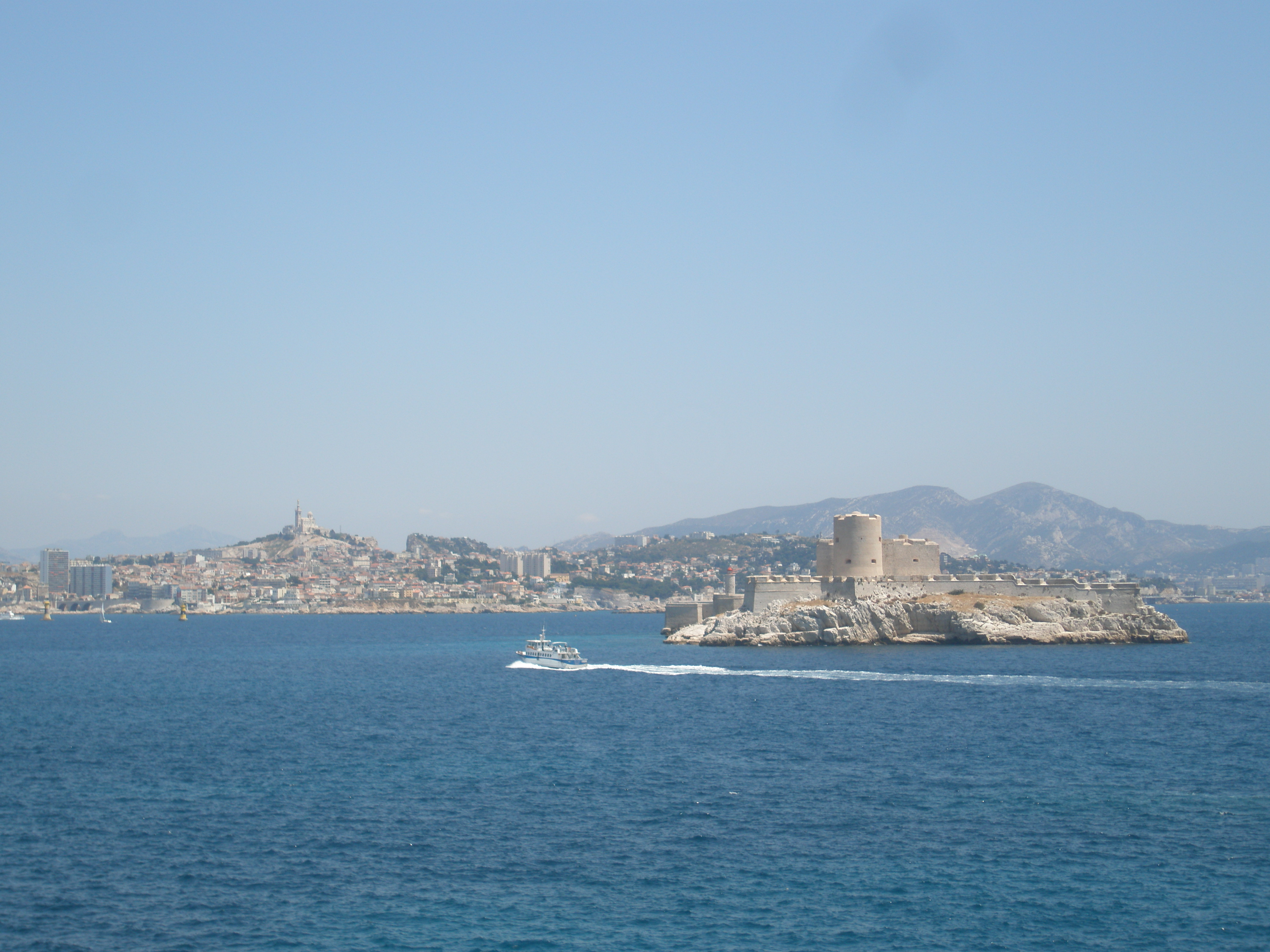
The Château d'If with Marseille in the background

The Château d'If (French pronunciation: [ʃɑto dif]; Occitan: Castèl d'If) is a fortress located on the Île d'If (Ilha d'If), the smallest island in the Frioul archipelago, situated about 1.5 kilometres off Marseille in southeastern France. Built in the 16th century, it later served as a prison until the end of the 19th century. The fortress was demilitarized and opened to the public in 1890. It is famous for being one of the settings of Alexandre Dumas's adventure novel The Count of Monte Cristo. It is one of the most visited sites in the city of Marseille (nearly 100,000 visitors per year).

== Island ==
The Île d'If measures 3 hectares (0.03 km^{2}) and is located 3.5 km (2 1/8 mi) west of the Old Port of Marseille. The entire island is heavily fortified; high ramparts with gun platforms surmount the cliffs, which rise steeply from the surrounding sea. Apart from the fortress the island is uninhabited.

== Fortress ==
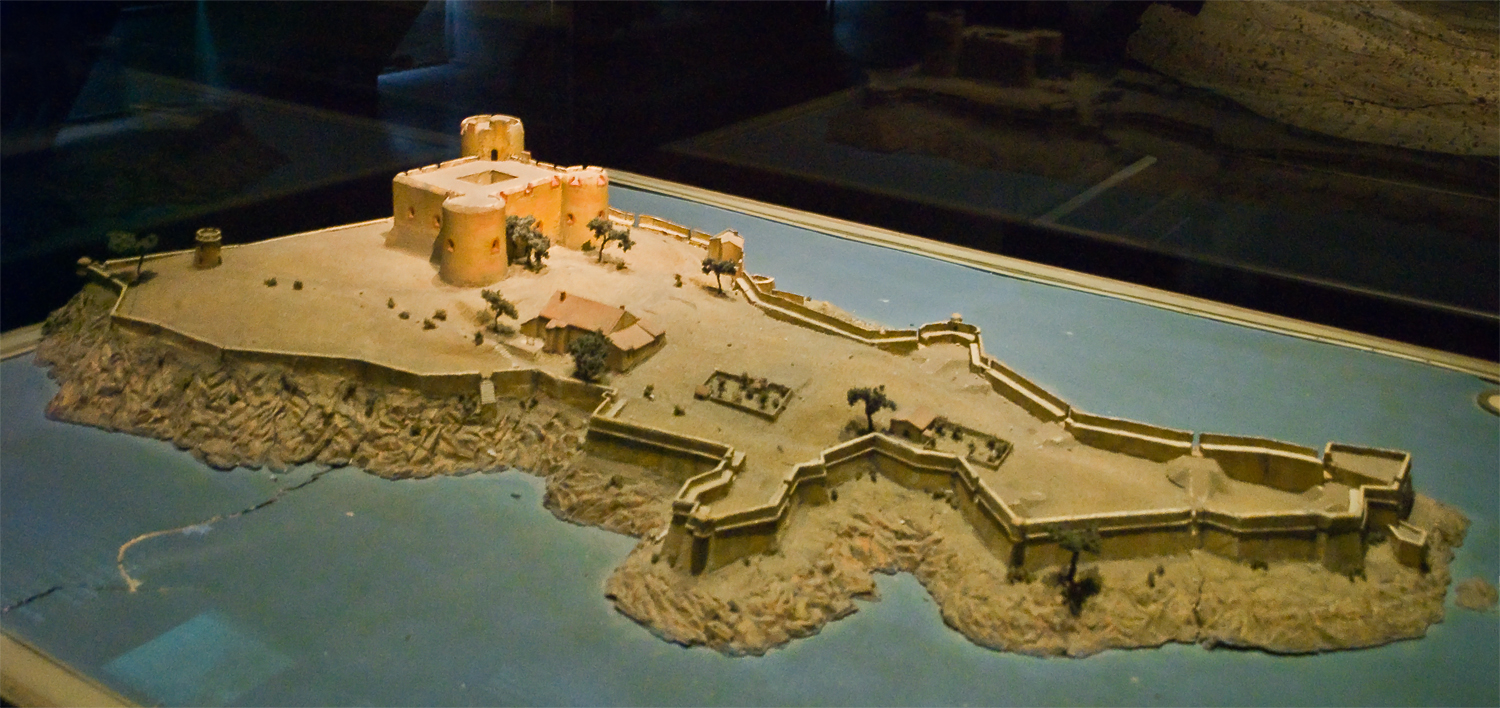
1681 scale model of the château d'If

The "château" is a square, three-storey building 28 m (92 ft) long on each side, flanked by three towers with large gun embrasures. It was built from 1524 to 1531 on the orders of King Francis I, who, during a visit in 1516, saw the island as a strategically important location for defending the coastline from attack from the sea.

The castle's principal military value was as a deterrent; it never had to fight off an actual attack. The closest it came to a genuine test of strength was in July 1531, when the Holy Roman Emperor Charles V made preparations to attack Marseille. However he abandoned the invasion plan.

In 1701 the military engineer Vauban questioned its suitability to defend against an actual attack: "The fortifications look like the rock[;] they are fully rendered, but very roughly and carelessly, with many imperfections. The whole [has] been very badly built[, ...] with little care [...] All the buildings [are] very crudely done [and] ill made."

The embalmed body of General Jean Baptiste Kléber was repatriated to France after his assassination in Cairo in 1800. First Consul Napoleon Bonaparte, fearing that his tomb would become a symbol to Republicanism, ordered that the body stay at the château. It remained there for 18 years, until King Louis XVIII granted Kléber a proper burial in his native Strasbourg.

== Prison ==
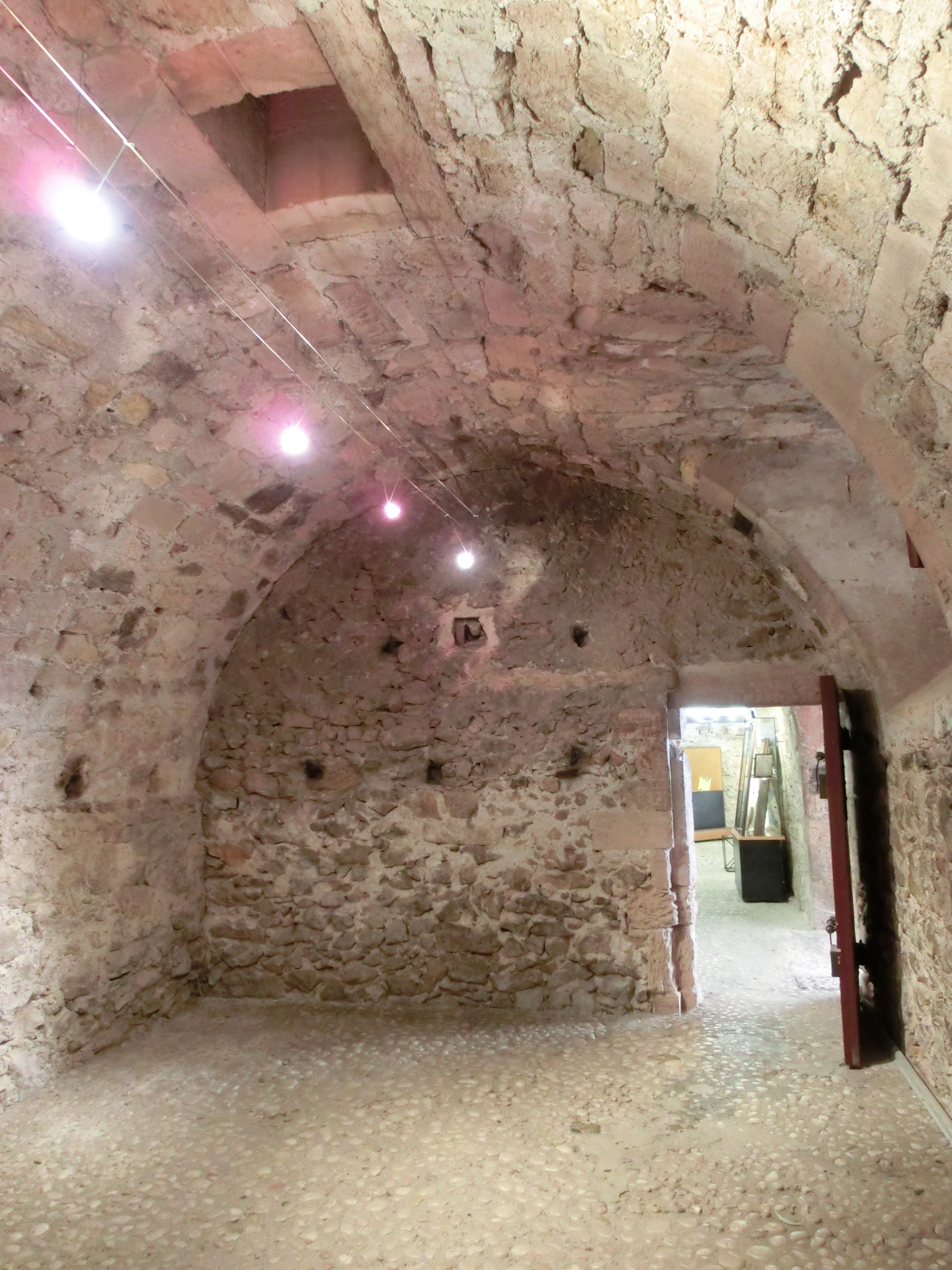
The cell named after Edmond Dantès at the Château d'If

The isolated location and dangerous offshore currents of the Château d'If made it an ideal escape-proof prison, very much like the island of Alcatraz in California in more recent times. Its use as a dumping ground for political and religious detainees soon made it one of the most feared and notorious jails in France. More than 3,500 Huguenots (French Calvinist Christians) were sent to the Château d'If, as was Gaston Crémieux, a leader of the Paris Commune, who was shot there in 1871.

The island became internationally famous in the 19th century when Alexandre Dumas used it as a setting for his novel The Count of Monte Cristo, published to widespread acclaim in 1844. In the novel, the main character Edmond Dantès (a commoner who later purchases the noble title of count) and Abbé Faria, his soon-to-be mentor, are both imprisoned on the island. After 14 years Dantès makes a daring escape, becoming the first person to do so and survive. In reality no one is known to have done so. The modern Château d'If maintains a roughly hewn dungeon in honour of Dantès as a tourist attraction.

As was common practice in those days, prisoners were treated differently according to their class and wealth. The poorest were placed at the bottom, confined perhaps twenty or more to a cell in windowless dungeons under the castle. However the wealthiest inmates were able to pay for their own private cells (or pistoles) higher up, with windows, a garderobe and a fireplace.

== The château today ==
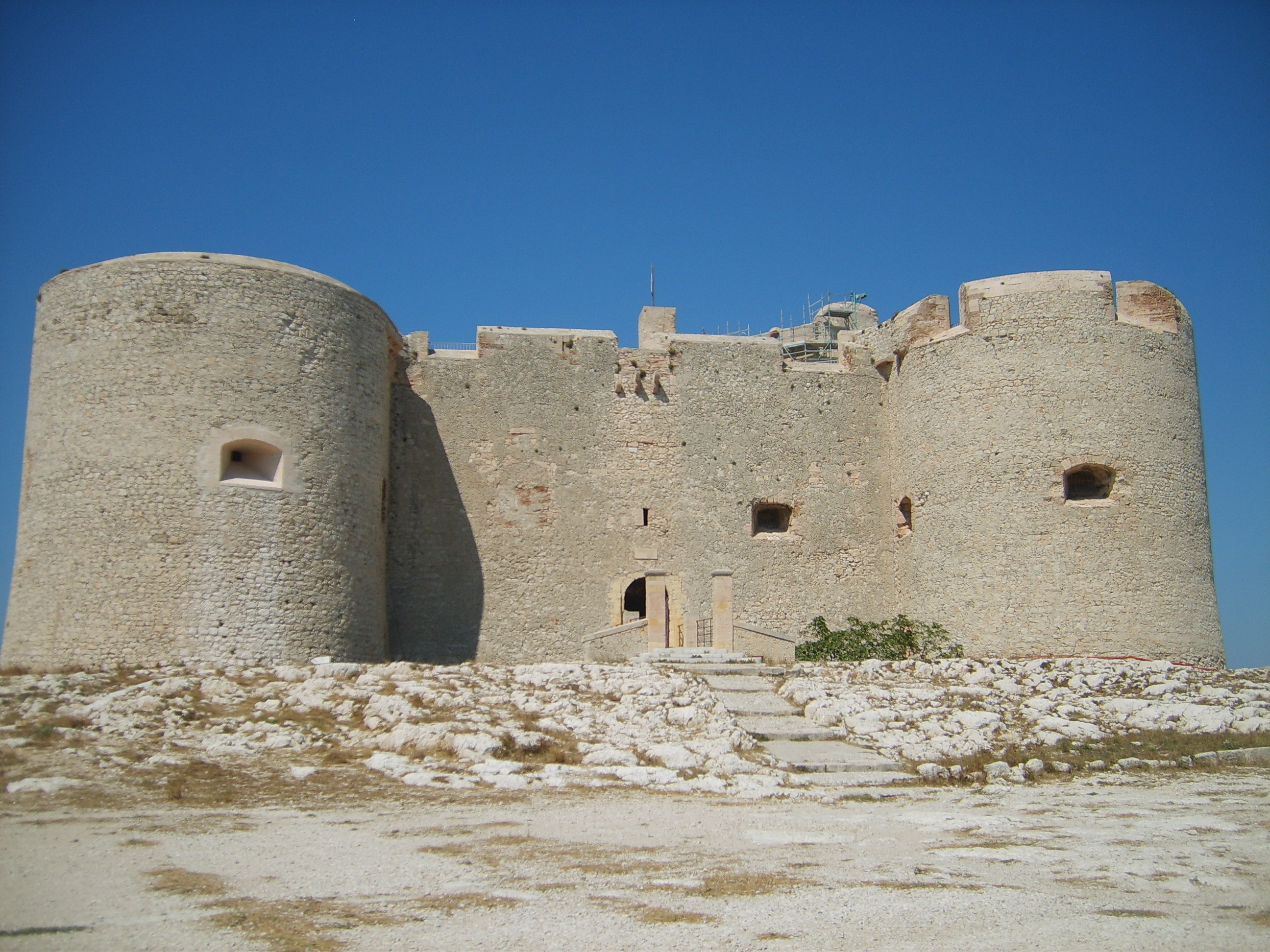
Front view of If Castle

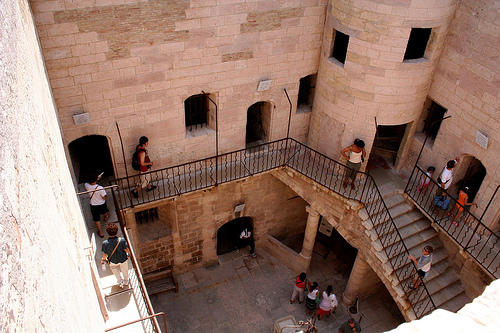
Tourists explore the château's courtyard

The château's use as a prison ceased at the end of the 19th century. It was demilitarized and opened to the public on 23 September 1890, and can be reached by boat from Marseille's old port. Its fame as the setting for Dumas' novel The Count of Monte Cristo has made the prison a popular tourist destination.

Mark Twain visited the château in July 1867, during a months-long pleasure excursion. He recounts his visit in his book, The Innocents Abroad. He says a guide took his party into the prison, which was not yet open to the public, and inside the cells, one of which he says housed the "Iron Mask". There is a sign at the château that says "Prison dite de l'Homme au Masque de Fer" ("Said to be the prison of the Man in the Iron Mask"), but this is likely only legend since the famed Man in the Iron Mask was never held at the Château d'If.

The Château d'If is listed as a monument historique by the French Ministry of Culture.

== In fictional works ==
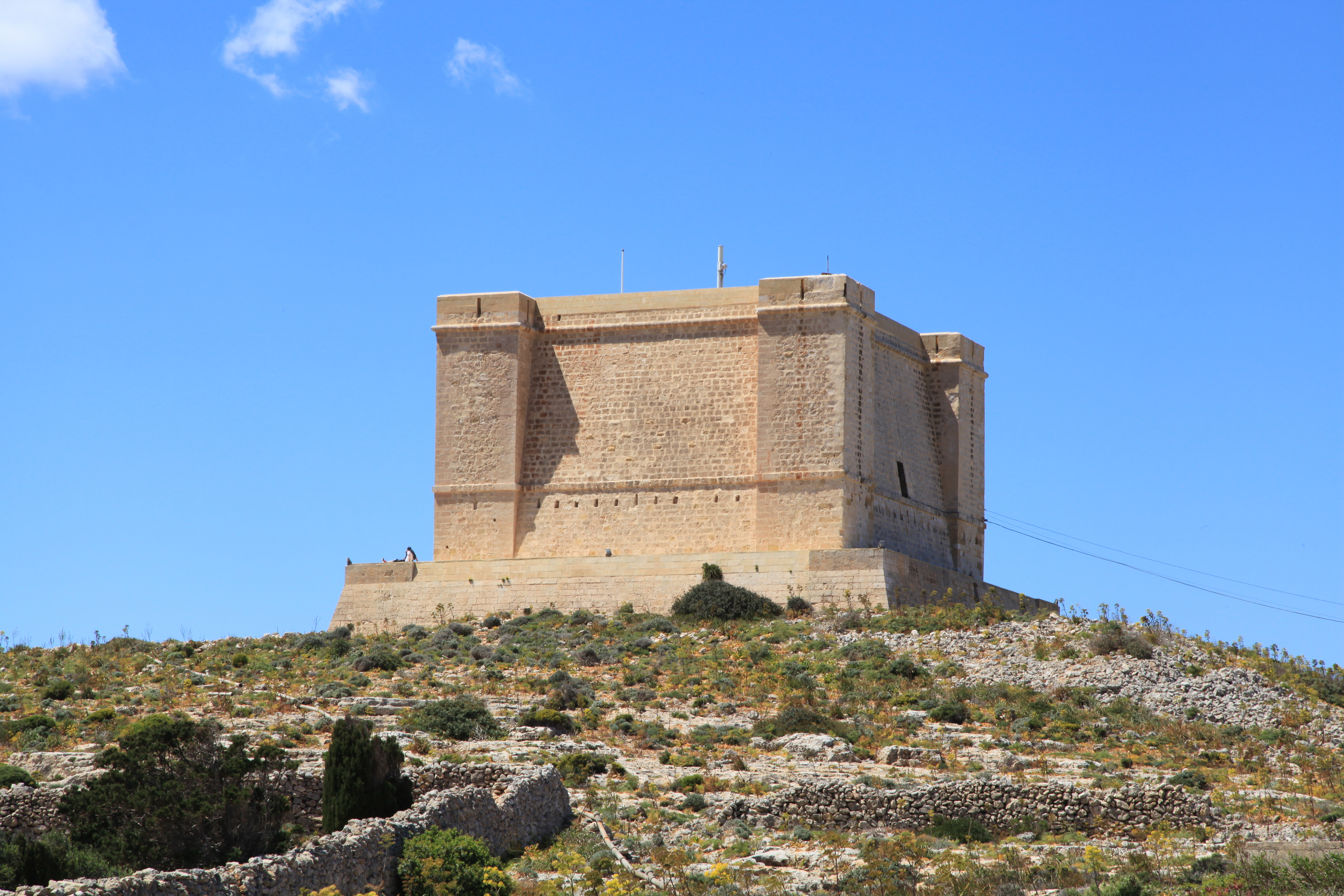
Château d'If was represented by Saint Mary's Tower in the 2002 film The Count of Monte Cristo

- The Château d'If is famous for being one of the settings of Alexandre Dumas' 1844 adventure novel The Count of Monte Cristo. However other locations have been used to represent Château d'If in film adaptations of the work. In the 2002 adaptation starring Jim Caviezel, the château was represented by Saint Mary's Tower on Comino, the smallest inhabited Maltese island. The cliff-top watchtower can be seen from the ferry crossing between Malta and Gozo.
- Chateau d'If is the title of a 1949, short story written by Jack Vance (previously published as New Bodies For Old).
- The fortress was used as the location where Alain Charnier, a.k.a. Frog One (Fernando Rey) meets Devereaux (Frédéric de Pasquale) to finalize the drugs shipment to the United States in the 1971 crime film The French Connection.
- In the 1956 "Tales of Old Dartmoor" episode of The Goon Show radio comedy series, Grytpype-Thynne has Dartmoor Prison put to sea to visit the Château d'If, as part of a plan to find the treasure of the Count of Monte Cristo.
- In the 1998 Shadowrun novel, Beyond The Pale by Jak Koke, Château d'If is the base of operations of the immortal elf, Harlequin.
- In the Clive Cussler 2010 novel Spartan Gold, the main characters visit the Château d'If as part of their quest for hidden treasure.
- In the internet comic Time (xkcd), set 11,000 years in the future, the story's two unnamed protagonists arrive at an ancient castle believed to be Château d'If, where they learn why the sea is rising.

== Notable prisoners ==
- Élie Neau, Huguenot refugee
- Philippe, Chevalier de Lorraine, lover of Philippe de France
- Jean-Baptiste Chataud, accused of bringing the plague to Marseille (c. 1720 – c. 1723)
- Honoré Mirabeau, writer, popular orator and statesman (1774–1775)
- Abbé Faria, his stay at the château is disputed (1797–?)
- Michel Mathieu Lecointe-Puyraveau, politician (1815)
- Gaston Crémieux, a leader of the Paris Commune (1871)

Contrary to common belief, the Marquis de Sade was not a prisoner at the château.

== See also ==
- Island castle
