= List of Mickey Spillane's Mike Hammer (1984 TV series) episodes =

This is a list of Mickey Spillane's Mike Hammer episodes.

== Series overview ==
Season	Episodes	Originally released	
Season	Episodes	First released	Last released
TV Movie 1	1	April 9, 1983	
1	12	January 26, 1984	April 14, 1984
2	14	September 29, 1984	January 12, 1985
TV Movie 2	1	April 18, 1986	
3	22	September 22, 1986	May 13, 1987
TV Movie 3	1	May 21, 1989	

== Episodes ==
=== TV Movie 1 (1983) ===
No.	Title	Directed by	Written by	Original release date
1	Murder Me, Murder You	Gary Nelson	Bill Stratton	April 9, 1983
Hammer is hired to protect an old flame who he hasn't seen in almost 20 years. Hammer has to investigate links between the woman's all female courier agency and bribes being given by an American helicopter manufacturer to a corrupt general in Central America. Notable guest stars - Tanya Roberts as Velda, Delta Burke, Jonathan Banks, Michelle Phillips, Randi Brooks, Eddie Egan.

=== Season 1 (1984) ===
No. overall	No. in season	Title	Directed by	Written by	Original release date
2	1	"More than Murder"	Gary Nelson	Bill Stratton	January 26, 1984
3	2	"More than Murder"	Gary Nelson	Bill Stratton	January 26, 1984
In the two-part opening pilot, Mike's fellow Vietnam War veteran, Captain Pat Chambers (Don Stroud), is gunned down during a drug bust at a high-stakes poker game, and implicated in drug trafficking. Velda is now played by Lindsay Bloom. A recurring character appears, Ozzie the Answer. Notable guest stars - Lynn-Holly Johnson, Denny Miller, Robyn Douglass, Kirk Cameron.
4	3	"24 Karat Dead"	Paul Krasny	Bill Froehlich & Mark Lisson	January 28, 1984
After being swindled out of their life savings, an elderly couple hire Mike to go after a fraudulent gold investment company. Recurring characters in this episode include Ozzie the Answer, Phillie Brock, Jenny the Barmaid, and Detective Hennessey. Guest stars include Tracy Scoggins as Claire DeVoe, Tom Hallick as Justin Heard, Barbara Stock as Lenore Wiggin, and Maria Heasley.
5	4	"Hot Ice"	Bernard Kowalski	Frank Abatemarco	February 4, 1984
When Mike's god daughter Mei Ling (Dorlie Fong) is taken hostage he finds himself caught-up in the world of Chinese Triads with a million-dollar diamond at the centre of it all. Recurring characters in this episode include Ozzie the Answer, Jenny the Barmaid, Phillie Brock, and Detective Hennessey. Guest stars include Frank Ashmore as Alex, Joan Chen as Ti, Michael Constantine as Mel Hurock, Catherine Parks as Rachel, George Lee Cheung as Kai Chang, Floyd Levine as Jack Belsen, and Keye Luke as Sun Woo.
6	5	"Seven Dead Eyes"	James Frawley	Joe Gores	February 11, 1984
Mike's mentor, Ridge Grundy (Myron Healey), is killed in an explosion, and the only clue he has to the mystery is a list of seven private detectives who are being murdered one by one. Recurring characters in this episode include Ozzie the Answer, Jenny the Barmaid, and Detective Hennessey. Guest stars include Dr. Joyce Brothers as herself, Dani Douthette as Leslie, Carol Portez as Floppie, Pamela Bowman as the Redhead, Irena Ferris as Kim Warren, Sandy Lang as the claimant, Pamela West as the Brunette, James Carroll Jordan as McCabe, Javier Grajeda as the Knifer, Mieko Kobayashi as Kyoko, John Walsh as the Announcer, John Reilly as Harry McCambridge, Priscilla Pointer as Edna Grundy, Les Lannom as Arthur Jackman, Clayton Landey as Don Foreman, and Robert Costanzo as Art Artel.
7	6	"Vickie's Song"	Michael Preece	Joe Gunn	February 18, 1984
Vickie (Linda Leilani Brown), a young singer whom Mike had previously helped get off heroin, turns up dead from an overdose. Undercover narcotics officer Harry Welch (Steven Keats) writes it off as a routine overdose, but Mike's sure it's murder. Recurring characters in this episode include Moochie and narcotics officer Harry Welch. Guest stars include Ernie Sabella as Salvatore Juno, Reid Smith as Gary Reddin, Gary Watkins as Jake Gill, Larry Dilg as Jason, Winnie Gardner as Kim, Dana Halsted as Dede, Lynn Herring as Georgette, Jan McGill as Nancy, Marilyn Staley as Collette, Zetta Whitlow as Betty, Leigh McCloskey, Tori Lysdahl, Spencer Milligan and Shawn Southwick.
8	7	"Shots in the Dark"	Michael Preece	Larry Gross	March 3, 1984
Mike rescues a woman (Jenilee Harrison) who is being followed by two men in Central Park. She is killed soon after and her roommate (Sharon Stone) is later kidnapped, but the police are under orders to sweep the entire case under the carpet. Mike has to unravel a trail of clues that involve a corporation that provides classified defense services to the government, a smug crime boss (Jeff Conaway) and a wealthy socialite (Delta Burke). Recurring characters in this episode are Ozzie, Jenny, and Officer Hennessey. Guest stars include Delta Burke, Jenilee Harrison, Sharon Stone, Burr DeBenning, and Jeff Conaway. (If you blink, you'll miss guest star Claudia Christian.)
9	8	"Dead on a Dime"	Arnold Laven	B.W. Sandefur	March 10, 1984
Mike kills an ex-cop who is shooting up a restaurant he is at. Mike finds himself wanting know why this happened. Recurring characters in this episode are Ben Powers as Moochie and Detective Hennessey. Guest starring Barbara Horan.
10	9	"Sex Trap"	James Frawley	B.W. Sandefur	March 24, 1984
Mike finds out a former lover is blackmailing foreign diplomats with tapes of them in compromising situations. Recurring characters in this episode include Ben Powers as Moochie and Jenny. Guest stars include Brett Halsey, Susan Walden, Mike Preston, Joe E. Tata, Vincent Caristi, Kopi Sotiropulus.
11	10	"Negative Image"	Leo Penn	George Lee Marshall	March 31, 1984
Mike believes a photo negative might hold clues to why a photographer was murdered and his models are coming up missing or dead. Recurring characters are Harry Welch (Steven Keats) and Jenny. Notable guest stars - Paul Lambert, Al Ruscio.
12	11	"The Perfect Twenty"	John Patterson	Joe Viola	April 7, 1984
Mike believes finding a set of counterfeit bill plates and their creator may help him solve the murder of two models and save the life of another. Recurring characters in this episode include Ben Powers as Moochie. Notable guest stars - Shannon Tweed, Dane Clark, Lynn Herring.
13	12	"Satan, Cyanide, and Murder"	Michael Preece	Stephen Downing	April 14, 1984
A client is shot and killed in Mike's office, and the police believe it was someone trying to kill Mike. But Mike thinks otherwise. Recurring characters are Johnny Moretti and Office Hennessey. Guest stars include Stepfanie Kramer, Linden Chiles.

=== Season 2 (1984–85) ===
No. overall	No. in season	Title	Directed by	Written by	Original release date
14	1	"Torch Song"	James Frawley	Sy Salkowitz	September 29, 1984
Mike pulls some strings to get a reformed arsonist a new job. But when he ends up getting killed in a fire on his first day of work, Mike has to figure out why. Recurring characters in this episode include Moochie, Ozzie, Jenny, and Officer Hennessey. Notable guest stars - Jim McMullan, Raye Birk
15	2	"Too Young to Die"	Russ Mayberry	Ed Scharlach	October 6, 1984
Mike investigates the strangling deaths of teenage runaways involved in prostitution. Recurring characters in this episode include Moochie. Notable guest stars - Wendie Malick, Dr. Joyce Brothers
16	3	"Kill Devil"	Russ Mayberry	B.W. Sandefur	October 13, 1984
After Mike's gun is used to kill a gang leader at a truce meeting, he'll stop at nothing to clear his name. But his detective work becomes sticky business when both gang-members and the police label him as the enemy. Recurring characters in this episode include Ozzie the Answer and Moochie. Guest stars include Ray Liotta as Tony Cable, Deborah Goodrich, Dan Lauria, Faith Minton, David Labiosa as Sammy, Vincent Keith Ford as Krager, and Debi Richter as Chi Chi.
17	4	"Catfight"	Christian I. Nyby II	Stephen J. Cannell	October 20, 1984
Mike believes his friend's murder may have something to do with a dead mobster. The only clue comes in the form of the gangster's will, which was distributed in the form of a puzzle to three women who can't get along. Recurring characters in this episode include Moochie. Notable guest stars - Barbi Benton, Lou Ferrigno, Rebecca Holden, Ann Turkel
18	5	"Warpath"	James Frawley	Sy Salkowitz	October 27, 1984
Mike works with members of a Native American tribal council that may be murdered because of an oil deal. Notable guest star - Michael Ironside
19	6	"Bonecrunch"	Michael Preece	Stephen Kandel	November 3, 1984
After an unpopular quarterback is murdered at a game in front of 60,000 spectators, Mike believes gambling may have been involved. Notable guest stars - Mary-Margaret Humes, Bubba Smith, Janine Turner
20	7	"Dead Card Down"	Leo Penn	B.W. Sandefur	November 10, 1984
When a friend that asked him for protection is murdered, Mike is left with only two clues, fake diamonds and half of a $10,000 bill. Recurring characters are Ozzie, Moochie, and Phillie Brock. Notable guest star - Katherine Cannon.
21	8	"The Deadly Prey"	Paul Stanley	B.W. Sandefur	November 10, 1984
After living abroad for a prolonged period, Velda's brother Gary returns to New York bearing gifts. But the happy reunion turns tragic when Gary is murdered in a dark alley. Mike soon finds that a smuggling ring involving exotic animals and priceless Chinese jade is his best lead. Recurring characters in this episode include Ozzie the Answer. Notable guest stars - Susan Anton, Henry Gibson, Marcy Lafferty
22	9	"A Death in the Family"	Ray Danton	Marvin Kupfer & B.W. Sandefur	November 24, 1984
Mike is caught in a war between two crime families after one of their leaders is killed. Recurring characters in this episode include Moochie. Notable guest stars - Barbara Bain, John Ireland
23	10	"Cold Target"	Jon C. Andersen	B.W. Sandefur & Duke Sandefur	December 1, 1984
Mike becomes a target for murder when testifying at a case against a member of a group of secret killers. Recurring characters in this episode include Moochie, Ozzie, Philly Brock, and Johnnie Moretti. Notable guest stars - Dick Van Patten, Susan Strasberg
24	11	"A Bullet for Benny"	Ray Danton	Chester Krumholz	December 8, 1984
Mike attracts the attention of both the FBI and racketeers while investigating the death of a shopkeeper. Recurring characters in this episode include Moochie and Ozzie. Notable guest star - Abe Vigoda
25	12	"Dead Man's Run"	Michael Preece	B.W. Sandefur	December 29, 1984
Mike gets involved in a revolution in a small country while searching for the killer of his former Army commander. Recurring character in this episode includes Ozzie. Notable guest star - Barbra Horan. Ending Hammer narration by Rich Little.
26	13	"Firestorm"	Cliff Bole	Stephen Kandel	January 5, 1985
After a rock singer is electrocuted at a rehearsal, Mike is suspicious when the band members aren't so much concerned about her death as they are for a missing demo tape of her new songs. Recurring characters in this episode include Moochie. Notable guest stars - Jan Smithers, Lauren Tewes, Dennis Cole, Casey Kasem, Herbie Hancock. Hammer narration by Rich Little.
27	14	"Deadly Reunion"	Sutton Roley	Jay Bernstein	January 12, 1985
Mike's old schoolmate Jimmy Fuller (Les Jankey) invites him to a retirement party for his favourite high school teacher Viola Green (Esther Rolle). The reunion turns ugly when revelers start turning up dead. Recurring characters in this episode include Ozzie the Answer and Moochie. Guest Stars include George Benson as George Langdon, Esther Rolle (Good Times) as Viola Green, Simone Griffeth, Chip Lucia, Steve Carelson, Lana Wood as Virginia Warburton, Cynthia Cypert as Marilyn, Alex Henteloff as Errol Ford, Terrence McGovern as Taylor Wilson, and Michael Gregory as Rick Osgoode. This is the first of two episodes to feature jazz legend George Benson as a guest star. He performs the title track from his album 20/20 on stage at the retirement party. Benson will appear again as a different character in season three's Harlem Nocturne. Hammer narration by Rich Little.

=== TV Movie 2 (1986) ===
No.	Title	Directed by	Written by	Original release date
28	The Return of Mickey Spillane's Mike Hammer	Ray Danton	Larry Brody, Janis Hendler & James M. Miller	April 18, 1986
Hammer becomes involved in a child-selling ring that has its origins in Vietnam when he witnesses the attempted kidnapping of the daughter of actress Joanna Lake (Lauren Hutton) during a shoot on a New York street. The made for TV movie—aimed at relaunching the Hammer franchise—starred the original cast (like recurring character, Jenny the Bartender), with guest appearances from Vince Edwards, John Karlen, Frank Mcrae, Leo Penn, Mike Preston, Stephen Macht, Mickey Rooney, Bruce Boxleitner, Dabney Coleman, and Dionne Warwick.

=== The New Mike Hammer, Season 3 (1986–87) ===
No. overall	No. in season	Title	Directed by	Written by	Original release date
29	1	"Deirdre"	Ray Danton	Herman Miller	September 27, 1986
Mae-Marie Corrigan (Leslie Wing) hires Hammer to find her sister Deirdre, whose disappearance may be connected to a religious radio show. The trail leads Hammer to murder, missing video tapes, and a philandering preacher called the Reverend Blessing (John S. Ragin). Recurring character - Jenny.
30	2	"Dead Pigeon"	Bruce Kessler	Fred Freiberger	October 4, 1986
An undercover cop is murdered and Hammer is framed for it. In the middle is Sheila Forbes, the cop's wife and Hammer's former girlfriend. Hammer has to find out who really did the murder and why. Notable guest stars - Randi Brooks, Christopher Stone, Robin Curtis.
31	3	"Golden Lady"	Ray Danton	Duke Sandefur	October 11, 1986
A union worker is murdered and Hammer is employed by his widow to help her get money owed to her from his pension fund. Hammer finds that the money has been embezzled through overseas accounts, but who was overseeing the fraud? Notable guest star - Nina Foch.
32	4	"Mike's Baby"	Bruce Kessler	B.W. Sandefur	October 18, 1986
Hammer finds an abandoned baby boy that is struggling to live, addicted to heroin. Searching for the boy's mother, Hammer finds her overdosed on heroin and strychnine. Who killed her, who's the boy's father and why did she really die? Notable guest stars - Anjanette Comer, Cornel Wilde
33	5	"To Kill a Friend"	Don Weis	B.W. Sandefur	November 5, 1986
Hammer leads a manhunt for a hood who, in the course of a jewel robbery, has gunned down Hammer's friend, Philly Brock, and left him with a bullet-riddled right arm. Recurring characters in this episode are Philly Brock, Ozzie, and Johnny Moretti.
34	6	"Mistress for the Prosecution"	Bruce Kessler	Arthur Ginsberg	November 12, 1986
Barrington is drugged and a blackmailer takes some compromising photos of him. He is being asked to lose all his current cases. He then asks Hammer to help him find out who is blackmailing him and why. Recurring character in this episode is Johnny Moretti.
35	7	"Harlem Nocturne"	Bruce Kessler	Arthur Ginsberg	November 26, 1986
A man on parole wants Hammer to find his former girlfriend, who he hasn't seen for eight years. The man had been in jail for an armoured car robbery where the money wasn't found, which is crucial to understanding her current whereabouts. Guest Stars include George Benson as Sweet Billy Marvel, Ernie Hudson as Digger Love, Lynn Whitfield as Delia Marvel, and Isabel Sanford (The Jeffersons) as Hot Mama Vibes. This is George Benson's second time appearing as a guest star in the series and he and his music are featured prominently. A performance of "Love Is Here Tonight", from his then recently released album While the City Sleeps... is featured in its entirety.
36	8	"Murder in the Cards"	Don Weis	Jay Bernstein & S.S. Schweitzer	December 3, 1986
Mike Hammer's determination to rescue the son of an old army buddy from a trial for robbery and murder sends him on an eerie mission to an upstate fishing lodge where danger waits. Notable guest stars - Jack Carter, Arte Johnson.
37	9	"Requiem for Billy"	Sigmund Neufeld Jr.	Herman Miller	December 10, 1986
Mike Hammer looks for the answer to who killed his young friend, but all he encounters are more questions. Notable guest stars - Barbara Bosson, Bill Macy, Martha Smith, Lyle Waggoner
38	10	"Little Miss Murder"	John Herzfeld	Ed Scharlach	January 7, 1987
A private school girl hires Hammer to find her father, a man who was the getaway driver for a hotel robbery to order to fund his daughter's school fees. The solution goes all the way up the social ladder to a senate candidate. Recurring character in this episode - Ozzie. Notable guest stars - Jeff Conaway, Tricia O'Neil
39	11	"Kill John Doe"	Marc Daniels	Howard Berk	January 21, 1987
A man with no memory walks into Hammer's office and wants to know who he is. It turns out he is a scientist wanted by the KGB. There are many twists and turns as Hammer tries to save him despite not being helped by the local agents. Notable guest stars - Tony Dow, Bo Hopkins, Jacklyn Zeman.
40	12	"Elegy for a Tramp"	Jon C. Andersen	B.W. Sandefur	January 28, 1987
When actress whom Mike knows dies when she jumped off her apartment, Mike wonders if someone pushed her to it. He starts by asking around and learns that she was abused emotionally. Notable guest stars - Theodore Bikel, Foster Brooks, Claudia Christian, Bernie Kopell
41	13	"Body Shot"	David Jackson	Ray Danton	February 4, 1987
An aging boxer (played by Larry Wilcox of CHiPs fame), desperate for money, is training for a fight but his sister is concerned as he is having blackouts. She asks Hammer to find out what is happening. When he investigates there seem to be other factors affecting the fight. Recurring character - Johnny Moretti. Notable guest stars - Genie Francis, Larry Wilcox.
42	14	"Who Killed Sister Lorna?"	Frank Beascoechea	Judy Burns	February 11, 1987
Sister Lorna disappears and Hammer is hired to find her. It turns out her husband was in a big payroll robbery and the money disappeared. When Sister Lorna is murdered, Hammer is determined to find the murderer and the money. Notable guest stars - Barbara Billingsley, Jared Martin, Karen Valentine.
43	15	"Deadly Collection"	David Hemmings	James Schmerer	February 25, 1987
A friend of Hammer's is blown up investigating a protection racket that is extorting money from a high fashion designer. Hammer continues the investigation and there is cross and double cross before he solves the case. Micky Dolenz guest-stars as a private investigator who relies heavily on computers and electronics. Other notable guest stars - Edward Albert, Gloria Loring.
44	16	"Green Blizzard"	Thomas J. Wright	Don Balluck	March 4, 1987
Mike helps an amateur counterfeiter who's gotten herself in trouble with the mob. Those gambling debts paid off with funny money didn't amuse them! Notable guest stars - Claude Akins, Edward Albert, Peter Scolari.
45	17	"The Last Laugh"	David Jackson	Arthur Ginsberg	March 18, 1987
Hammer's new receptionist asks him to find her manager, who has gone missing. After the man is murdered, Hammer heads to the west coast after his receptionist, looking for the murderer. Notable guest stars - Shelley Berman, Robert Walden.
46	18	"Lady Killer"	Paul Lynch	Edward Di Lorenzo	March 25, 1987
A murderer is killing successful businesswomen many of whom appeared on a TV show. Hammer must act quickly before his client, a women's magazine editor, is also killed. Dr. Joyce Brothers, who had hosted the TV show, gives Hammer a psychological profile of the killer. Other notable guest stars - Barbara Carrera, Jenilee Harrison, Dennis Cole, Joan Severance.
47	19	"Mike Gets Married"	Charles Braverman	Paul Diamond	April 15, 1987
A woman is held at the airport whose documents say that she's Mrs. Mike Hammer. She's a foreigner who claimed to be his wife so that she could get into the country quietly. She says that her country is trying to change things and is in New York to collect money intended for the reform. When someone tries to kill her, Mike kills him but without her testimony, it can't be proven that it was justified, and she's about to be deported. So Mike marries her. This episode features a guest appearance by Roxie Roker (The Jeffersons). Other notable guest stars - Barbara Stock, Greg Evigan.
48	20	"A Blinding Fear"	Stacy Keach	Jay Bernstein	April 29, 1987
An arms dealer, Decker, has a blind 12 year-old daughter, Jennifer. Her dog is stolen and Hammer is asked to find it. It turns out to be part of a plot to kidnap the daughter and hold her for ransom. Hammer must save her and the dog. Notable guest stars - Heather Thomas, Fran Ryan, Michael Ansara, Persis Khambatta, Ken Kercheval, Peter Jason.
49	21	"Green Lipstick"	Ted Lange	Gregory S. Dinallo	May 6, 1987
A singer appears in Hammer's office asking for his help to discover why the money she is raising for a charity is disappearing. She turns out to be the daughter he never knew existed. Notable guest stars - Emma Samms, John Karlen, Vanity
50	22	"A Face in the Night"	Jay Bernstein	E. Nick Alexander	May 13, 1987
An Australian private detective approaches Hammer to find a missing author. Her only clue is "The Face," Hammer's mysterious woman. He catches up with The Face and finds out her story. Together they discover why the author is wanted. Notable guest stars - Mary Frann, Donna Denton.

=== TV Movie 3 (1989) ===
No.	Title	Directed by	Written by	Original release date
51	Mike Hammer: Murder Takes All	John Nicolella	Mark Edward Edens & Rudy Day	May 21, 1989
When Hammer refuses an invitation to Las Vegas by Johnny Roman (Edward Winter), a shady entertainer, he is abducted and dropped from a plane into the city. Roman is later killed and the evidence points to Hammer. As he sets out to clear his name more murders start piling up, with the evidence also pointing to him. A recurring character appears, Jennie the Barmaid. This made for TV movie is the last of the core Mickey Spillane's Mike Hammer franchise. It notably features Jim Carrey in a small part, shortly before he became famous in the sketch comedy, In Living Color. Other notable guest stars - Lynda Carter, Lyle Alzado, Royce Applegate, Michelle Phillips.
