= More Than Murder =

- Genre: Action; Crime; Mystery; Thriller
- Created by: Mickey Spillane
- Based on: characters created by Mickey Spillane
- Screenplay by: Stephen Downing; Bill Stratton
- Story by: Bill Strattom
- Directed by: Gary Nelson
- Starring: Stacy Keach; Lindsay Bloom
- Theme music composer: Earle Hagen
- Country of origin: United States
- Original language: English

Production
- Executive producer: Jay Bernstein
- Producer: Lew Gallo
- Production locations: Culver City, California; The Burbank Studios, Burbank, California
- Cinematography: James Crabe
- Editor: Michael F. Anderson
- Running time: 96 minutes
- Production companies: Columbia Pictures Television; Jay Bernstein Productions

Original release
- Network: CBS
- Release: January 26, 1984

More Than Murder is a 1984 American made-for-television mystery film starring Stacy Keach as Mickey Spillane's iconic hardboiled private detective Mike Hammer. It aired on January 26, 1984, at 9:00 p.m. and was the second of two pilots featuring Keach in the part - the other being Murder Me, Murder You (1983) - that blazed a path for the 1980s version of the CBS series Mickey Spillane's Mike Hammer, which debuted on January 28, 1984.

== Plot ==
When his longtime friend Captain Pat Chambers is wounded in a drug bust and arrested as an accessory to drug trafficking, private detective Mike Hammer vows to help him clear his name. Assistant District Attorney Barrington dislikes Hammer and believes that Chambers is guilty.

== Cast ==
- Stacy Keach as Mike Hammer
- Lindsay Bloom as Velda
- Don Stroud as Captain Pat Chambers
- Kent Williams as Assistant D.A. Lawrence D. Barrington
- Tim McIntire as Malcolm Dobbs
- Lynn-Holly Johnson as Sandy
- Sam Groom as Tom Phillips
- Richard Romanus as Bedrick Bordante
- Denny Miller as Tallahassee Smith
- Robyn Douglass as Eve Warwick
- Danny Goldman as Ozzie
- Gail Ramsey as Linda(as Gail Rae Carlson)
- Kevin King as Davey
- Ingrid Anderson as Angela

== Reception ==
In review printed in The New York Times on January 27, 1984, John J. O'Connor wrote, "Mr. Keach has cultivated a perfect kind of New York-seedy look. His suit nearly always needs pressing, and his hat is inevitably worn at a jaunty angle. And most of his lines are delivered with a low-keyed snarl." O'Connor concluded, "Is this supposed age of liberation ready for an unrepentant male chauvinist pig? Network television seems to think so."

In the book Mickey Spillane on Screen: A Complete Study of the Television and Film Adaptations by Max Allan Collins and James L. Traylor, the authors state that More Than Murder "has an episodic TV approach that makes it a lesser film than its predecessor."

== Home media ==
After almost 25 years, More Than Murder was released on DVD by Sony Pictures as the second disc of a two-DVD set also featuring the 1983 TV movie Murder Me, Murder You.
