= Bruce Babcock =

American composer

Bruce H. Babcock (born 1951) is an American composer. He is known for his works in television, film, and the concert hall. He has composed for various television series, including Murder, She Wrote, Matlock, and Father Dowling Mysteries. He has also composed for many films, including Lethal Weapon, the Die Hard franchise, and King Kong.

Babcock credits his study with other composers such as Hugo Friedhofer, Earle Hagen and Paul Glass as an important contributor to his music. Babcock spent more than 25 years in media music before returning to his classical roots, leading to performances of his concert works across the United States.

== Early life and education ==
Bruce Babcock grew up in Santa Barbara, California. He is the son of astronomer Horace W. Babcock and grandson of astronomer Harold D. Babcock. Bruce went on to earn both Bachelor's and Master's degrees in music composition from California State University at Northridge in the mid-1970s.

== Career ==
Babcock began studying with Swiss-American classical composer Paul Glass in 1971 and won the Young Musicians Foundation composition prize in 1976 for his "Music for String Orchestra," performed at UCLA's Royce Hall under the baton of Calvin Simmons.

His studies with Glass led to further study with film composer Hugo Friedhofer and television composer Earle Hagen later in the 1970s and early 1980s. Hagen opened the door for Babcock to work in television, initially orchestrating Hagen's jazzy scores for the Mike Hammer movies Murder Me, Murder You (1983) and More Than Murder (1984), then writing additional music for the follow-up series Mickey Spillane's Mike Hammer.

Beginning in the fall of 1987, Babcock composed complete musical scores for TV mystery and detective series. Over the next decade, he scored approximately 90 hour-long episodes of the Andy Griffith canny-Southern-lawyer series Matlock (1986-1995), Tom Bosley's crime-solving-priest Father Dowling Mysteries (1990-1991), and Angela Lansbury's author-as-sleuth series Murder, She Wrote (1992-1996).

His Murder, She Wrote scores often included evocations of the various locales that character Jessica Fletcher visited in later seasons (including Ireland, Africa, Hong Kong, Italy and Australia). His very first score for the series, "The Wind Around the Tower", was the first to be Emmy-nominated since composer John Addison won for the pilot score.

His Emmy-winning score for Matlock was for "The Strangler," a sixth-season serial-killer story. His Emmy-nominated Father Dowling score (the only Emmy attention of any kind for the series) was for "The Consulting Detective," a Sherlock Holmes story that featured solo violin, alluding to Holmes' musical hobby.

Babcock also began scoring two-hour television films during this period (including three in NBC's Moment of Truth series) Other television series work included MacGyver, Jake and the Fatman, Diagnosis: Murder, Falcon Crest, Island Son, and Guns of Paradise. He also worked in animation, scoring two seasons of The Spooktacular New Adventures of Casper during 1997–98.

Major film composers became aware of Babcock's reputation and began hiring him as orchestrator and additional-music composer for such high-profile studio films such as the first two Die Hard films, the four Lethal Weapon films, Spider-Man 3, Robin Hood, Prince of Thieves, Final Destination, Final Destination 2, and King Kong.

In the 2000s, Babcock turned his attention to music for churches and concert halls, earning awards for many of these new works. Six pieces, all written between 2005 and 2009, were collected on his first album, Time, Still (Navona Records). Included were "Irrational Exuberance," written for the unusual combination of alto saxophone, cello and piano; and a cello sonata, "Imagined / Remembered."

His "Be Still," a choral setting of Psalm 46:10, recorded by The Crossing, is a meditation on eight words from Scripture, while "This Is What I Know," based on poems by American writer Dorothy Parker, also earned praise. The cappella "All unto Me", inspired by a 2007 sermon by South Africa's Archbishop Desmond Tutu, was commissioned for the 125th anniversary of All Saints Church in Pasadena, California and performed before the archbishop upon his return to the church in 2011.

His performance "Alternative Facts" for solo piano, recorded by Gloria Cheng, made a political statement about democracy.

Babcock's "Nevertheless," for violin, cello and piano, was debuted by Trio Casals at New York's Carnegie Hall in 2023. Dedicated to women "who have shown great perseverance and carried on despite a global pandemic, a violent political insurrection, a war in Ukraine and multiple mass shootings, not to mention attacks on women's healthcare and voting rights," it too earned acclaim.

Pianist Anna Kislitsyna premiered "Time and Again," Babcock's four-movement piano sonata, at Carnegie Hall in June 2022. Another at a major venue was Babcock's "Of Two Minds," for violin and bassoon, performed at Washington's Kennedy Center in July 2022.

Babcock's own heritage as the son and grandson of astronomers has found expression in additional works: "Event Horizon", a work for large orchestra the composer calls "a brief ode to the mysteries of the universe" written in 2005; "Watcher of the Sky", a three-movement string quartet that celebrated the sesquicentennial of the birth of astrophysicist George E. Hale, premiered in 2018 inside the dome at California's Mount Wilson Observatory; "Give Me Your Stars", for soprano and string quartet, also from 2018; and 2019's "Promethean Fire", for soprano Hila Plitmann, violin and harp, also inspired by Hale, who founded the Wilson Observatory.

Babcock served as secretary-treasurer of the Society of Composers & Lyricists from 1993 to 1996. He donated his scores to The Film Music Society in 2014 and they now reside at his alma mater, California State University at Northridge.

== Awards and nominations ==
Babcock was Emmy-nominated for six consecutive years starting in 1990. He won the 1992 Emmy for an episode of Matlock ("outstanding individual achievement in music composition for a series"). Three nominations were for Murder, She Wrote (two for dramatic score, one for best song), one for Father Dowling Mysteries, and there was an additional nomination for Matlock.

He earned two Daytime Emmy nominations for his music for the Casper cartoon series and eight BMI Primetime Television Music Awards for his work on Murder, She Wrote and Matlock.

"SpringScape," a trio for harp, viola and flute, was the winning entry in the 2006 Debussy Trio Composition competition; it later won a Silver Medal in the Global Music Awards of 2022.

His "Alternative Facts" for solo piano won The American Prize in 2021 and his "Nevertheless" won the Silver Medal in the Global Music Awards in 2022, as did his choral work "Be Still." His "Event Horizon" also won a Silver Medal in 2023.
