= Kent Williams (actor) =

American actor

- Occupation: Actor
- Years active: 1971–2008
- Spouse(s): Robin Curtis (?-?) (divorced)

Kent Williams is an American actor. He is known for his roles in the television programs Mickey Spillane's Mike Hammer, and The New Mike Hammer, and Mike Hammer, Private Eye.

== Career ==
=== 1970s ===
Williams first acting job was in The Homecoming: A Christmas Story (1971) where the television film led to the series The Waltons. Next he was in the film The Eagle has Landed (1976). In 1979, Williams was in The In-Laws and Time After Time.

=== 1980s ===
In 1980, Williams was in Heart Beat and in the TV film Act of Love. Williams lent his voice to the radio dramatization of Star Wars (1981). Also in 1981, he starred in the film Honky Tonk Freeway and the TV film A Small Killing on CBS. Williams next starred in NBC's TV film The Day the Bubble Burst (1982). In 1983, he starred in the film WarGames. Next Williams would star in four TV films for CBS; 3 of which were based on Mickey Spillane's Mike Hammer: Murder Me, Murder You (1983), More Than Murder (1984), Murder: By Reason of Insanity (1985), and The Return of Mickey Spillane's Mike Hammer (1986).

In 1987, Williams was in the short film Ray's Male Heterosexual Dance Hall. In 1988, he starred in the TV films Stranger on My Land and Leap of Faith.

From 1984 to 1986 Williams starred on the CBS series The New Mike Hammer. He would guest star on Cagney & Lacey, Vietnam War Story, and Simon & Simon.

=== 1990s ===
Williams would guest star on Sydney, L.A. Law, MacGyver, Reasonable Doubts, Crime & Punishment, Touched by an Angel, Dr. Quinn, Medicine Woman, Murder, She Wrote, Nowhere Man, New York Undercover, and Law & Order. He starred in the TV films Barbarians at the Gate (1993), Rubdown (1993) on USA Network, Come Die with Me: A Mickey Spillane's Mike Hammer Mystery (1994), and The Sister-in-Law (1995), In 1993, Williams would star in the film Living Dangerously. In 1994, he would star in the film Dead on Sight.

=== Later career ===
Williams would star in 2008 film Mind Morgue and the 2021 miniseries A Little Dream.

== Personal life ==
Williams married actress Robin Curtis while meeting on the set of The New Mike Hammer. They divorced soon afterwards.

== Filmography ==
=== Film ===
Year	Title	Role	Director	Notes	Ref
1976	The Eagle has Landed	Mallory	John Sturges	Epic War film Uncredited; Based on the 1975 novel by Jack Higgins	
1979	The In-Laws	Ski Mask	Arthur Hiller	Action comedy film	
1979	Time After Time	Assistant	Nicholas Meyer	Science fiction film also written by Meyer	
1980	Heart Beat	Ogden	John Byrum	Romantic drama film also written by Byrum; Based on the autobiography of Carolyn Cassady	
1981	Honky Tonk Freeway	Kelly's guest	John Schlesinger	Comedy film	
1983	WarGames	Cabot	John Badham	Techno-thriller film	
1987	Ray's Male Heterosexual Dance Hall	Steve Cook	Bryan Gordon	Short film also written by Gordon; Won Academy award for Best Live Action Short Film	
1993	Living Dangerously	Interrogator	Short film	Michael R. Williams	
1994	Dead on Sight	Sheriff Holleran	Ruben Preuss	Mystery-thriller film	
2008	Mind Morgue	Detective Brown	Mark Daniel Foley; Marc Dube	Horror film	

=== Television ===
Year	Title	Role	Notes	Ref
1971	The Homecoming: A Christmas Story	Shepherd #1	Made-for-TV movie directed by Fielder Cook; Pilot for the seriesThe Waltons	
1980	Act of Love	Dr. Mitchell	Made-for-TV movie directed by Jud Taylor; Based on the book Act of Love: The Killing of George Zygmanik by Judith Paige Mitchell	
1981	A Small Killing	Michael	Made-for-TV movie directed by Steven Hilliard Stern	
1982	The Day the Bubble Burst	Uncredited	Made-for-TV movie directed by Joseph Hardy; Based on the 1979 novel of the same name	
1983	Cagney & Lacey	Peter Blair	Episode: "Chop Shop" (S 2:Ep 18)	
1983	Murder Me, Murder You	Barrington	Made-for-TV movie directed by Gary Nelson on CBS	
1984	More Than Murder	Assistant D.A. Lawrence D. Barrington	Made-for-TV movie directed by Gary Nelson on CBS	
1984–1986	The New Mike Hammer	Assistant D. A. / Special Prosecutor Lawrence D. Barrington	Series regular	
1985	Murder: By Reason of Insanity	Dick Crowell	Made-for-TV movie directed by Anthony Page	
1986	The Return of Mickey Spillane's Mike Hammer	Barrington	Made-for-TV movie directed by Ray Danton	
1988	Stranger on My Land	Uncredited	Made-for-TV movie directed by Larry Elikann	
1988	Vietnam War Story	Sgt. Allard	Episode: "Separated" (S 1:Ep 7)	
1988	Leap of Faith	Dr. Simms	Made-for-TV movie directed by Stephen Gyllenhaal	
1988	Simon & Simon	Ben Vaughn	Episode: "Simon & Simon and Associates" (S 8:Ep 2)	
1990	Sydney	Vic	Episode: "Cliffhanger" (S1 :Ep 3)	
1990	L.A. Law	David Shepard	Episode: "Vowel Play" (S 5:Ep 6)	
1991	MacGyver	Clinton Ferris	Episode: "Off the Wall" (S 7:Ep 12)	
1992	Reasonable Doubts	Lewis Oliver	Episode: "A Rose is a Rose" (S 2:Ep 9)	
1993	Crime & Punishment	Joe Lipskey	Episode: "Best Laid Plans" (S 1:Ep 3)	
1993	Barbarians at the Gate	Tom Hill	Biographical comedy-drama made-for-TV movie directed by Glenn Jordan; Based on the 1989 book of the same name by Bryan Burrough and John Helyar	
1993	Rubdown	Armstorong	Made-for-TV movie directed by Stuart Cooper	
1994	Touched by an Angel	Oliver MacGregor	Episode: "The Heart of the Matter" (S 1:Ep 6)	
1994	Dr. Quinn, Medicine Woman	Vincent	Episodes: "The Washington Affair, part 1" (S 3:Ep 7) "The Washington Affair, part 2" (S 3:Ep 8)	
1994	Come Die with Me: A Mickey Spillane's Mike Hammer Mystery	Jugs	Made-for-TV movie directed by Armand Mastroianni on CBS	
1995	Murder, She Wrote	Freddie Layton	Episode: "Another Killing in Cork" (S 11:Ep 20)	
1995	The Sister-in-Law	Jeff Powers	Made-for-TV movie directed by Noel Nosseck	
1995	Nowhere Man	Mr. Grey	Episode: "Something About Her" (S 1:Ep 4)	
1997	New York Undercover	Reynolds	Episode: "The Promised Land" (S 3:Ep 17)	
1997	Law & Order	Hank Coburn	Episode: "Terminal" (S 7:Ep 23)	
1997–1998	Mike Hammer, Private Eye	Deputy Mayor Barry Lawerence	Series regular	
2021	A Little Dream	Cop	Miniseries	

== Radio ==
Year	Title	Role	Notes	Ref
1981	Star Wars	Uncredited	Radio dramatization directed by John Madden; Based on the original 1977 film	
