= Mike Hammer, Private Eye =

- DVD cover
- Genre: Crime; Drama; Mystery
- Starring: Stacy Keach; Shane Conrad; Shannon Whirry; Kent Williams; Peter Jason; Malgosia Tomassi
- Theme music composer: Eric Allaman
- Opening theme: Harlem Nocturne
- Country of origin: United States
- No. of seasons: 1
- No. of episodes: 26

Production
- Executive producers: Jay Bernstein; Jeff Franklin; Steve Waterman
- Producer: Larry B. Williams
- Cinematography: Nicholas Josef von Sternberg
- Editors: Greg A. Simone; Jonathan Seay; Michael Matlock; Richard E. Rabjohn; Shawn Paper; Chris A. Moore
- Running time: 60 minutes
- Production companies: Franklin/Waterman Worldwide; Jay Bernstein Enterprises; The Kushner-Locke Company

Original release
- Network: Syndication
- Release: September 28, 1997 – June 13, 1998

Related
- Mickey Spillane's Mike Hammer

Mike Hammer, Private Eye is an American syndicated television program based on the adventures of the fictitious private detective Mike Hammer, created by novelist Mickey Spillane. Like the previous series, it was produced by Jay Bernstein but in a less hands-on capacity. A total of 26 episodes were produced. The show failed to gain a wide audience and, as a result, it was canceled after only one season. Mike Hammer, Private Eye premiered on September 28, 1997. The final episode of the series aired on June 13, 1998.

== Premise ==
The series starred Stacy Keach and was seen as an attempt to revive the character he had played in Mickey Spillane's Mike Hammer and The New Mike Hammer, two moderately successful CBS series from the 1980s. Kent Williams was the only other regular actor from the 1980s series to return, albeit in a different role. Shannon Whirry played Hammer's secretary Velda, who had been played by Lindsay Bloom in the previous series. Guest star Tracy Scoggins, formerly seen in a different role in the 1984 episode of Mickey Spillane's Mike Hammer, "24 Karat Dead," appears in episode 2, "Beat Street," of this series.

== Cast ==
=== Main ===
- Stacy Keach as Mike Hammer
- Shane Conrad as Nick Farrell
- Shannon Whirry as Velda
- Kent Williams as Deputy Mayor Barry Lawerence
- Peter Jason as Capt. Skip Gleason
- Malgosia Tomassi as Maya Ricci

=== Guest ===
- Rebekah Chaney as The Face
- Harvey Shane as Eddie NoShoes (ep. 20, “Lucky in Love”)

== Episodes ==
| No. | Title | Directed by | Written by | Original release date |
|---|---|---|---|---|
| 1 | "Prodigal Son" | Allen Berton | Fred A. Wyler | September 28, 1997 |
Mike Hammer goes after the killer of his friend, Mike Farrell. He encounters the Russian mob in his search for the killer.
| 2 | "Beat Street" | Rex Piano | Chris Baena | October 5, 1997 |
An accused polluter hires Mike, but then the reporter who did an expose on him is found dead making him a murder suspect.
| 3 | "www.murder" | James Lemmo | Chris Baena | October 11, 1997 |
| 4 | "Hoop Nightmares" | Rex Piano | George Melrod | October 18, 1997 |
| 5 | "False Truths" | Wayne Ewing | Tanya Hekimian | October 25, 1997 |
| 6 | "Halloween" | Jonathan Winfrey | John Henry Reed | November 1, 1997 |
| 7 | "Body Odor" | Rex Piano | Jake Kalleen | November 8, 1997 |
| 8 | "Sins of the Father" | Greydon Clark | George Melrod | November 15, 1997 |
| 9 | "A Penny Saved" | Greydon Clark | David Reskin & Greydon Clark | November 22, 1997 |
| 10 | "The Life You Save" | Wayne Ewing | Chris Baena | January 17, 1998 |
| 11 | "The Long Road to Nowhere" | Jonathan Winfrey | Brian Oppenhemier | January 24, 1998 |
| 12 | "The Art of Murder" | Rex Piano | George Melrod | January 31, 1998 |
| 13 | "Countdown to Murder" | William Lucking | Peter McGovern & Michael O'Connell | February 7, 1998 |
| 14 | "The Cutting Edge" | Wayne Ewing | Richard Johnson | February 14, 1998 |
| 15 | "Big Brother's Secret" | Rex Piano | Raul Panadero | February 21, 1998 |
| 16 | "A Candidate for Murder" | Jonathan Winfrey | Chris Baena | February 28, 1998 |
| 17 | "Dump the Creep" | Dimitri Logothetis | Peter McGovern & Michael O'Connell | April 11, 1998 |
| 18 | "Chop Shop" | Rex Piano | Brian Oppenhemier | April 18, 1998 |
| 19 | "The Maya Connection" | Dimitri Logothetis | Jennifer Boller | April 25, 1998 |
| 20 | "Lucky in Love" | Rex Piano | Chris Baena | May 2, 1998 |
| 21 | "Songbird: Part 1" | Jonathan Winfrey | Peter McGovern & Michael O'Connell | May 9, 1998 |
| 22 | "Songbird: Part 2" | Jonathan Winfrey | Peter McGovern & Michael O'Connell | May 16, 1998 |
| 23 | "Gone Fishin" | William Lucking | Peter McGovern & Michael O'Connell | May 23, 1998 |
| 24 | "Dead Men Talk" | Rex Piano | Chris Baena | May 30, 1998 |
| 25 | "A New Leaf: Part 1" | Jonathan Winfrey | Jennifer Boller | June 6, 1998 |
| 26 | "A New Leaf: Part 2" | Jonathan Winfrey | Jennifer Boller | June 13, 1998 |
