= Murder Me, Murder You =

- Double feature DVD together with More Than Murder
- Genre: Action; Crime; Mystery; Thriller
- Created by: Mickey Spillane
- Based on: characters created by Mickey Spillane
- Written by: Bill Stratton
- Directed by: Gary Nelson
- Starring: Stacy Keach; Tanya Roberts; Don Stroud; Kent Williams; Delta Burke; Tom Atkins; Jonathan Banks
- Theme music composer: Earle Hagen; J.J. Johnson
- Country of origin: United States
- Original language: English

Production
- Executive producers: Larry A. Thompson; Jay Bernstein
- Producer: Lew Gallo
- Cinematography: Gayne Rescher
- Editor: Donald R. Rode
- Running time: 96 minutes (approx.)
- Production companies: Columbia Pictures Television; Jay Bernstein Productions

Original release
- Network: CBS
- Release: April 9, 1983

Murder Me, Murder You is a 1983 American made-for-television mystery film starring Stacy Keach as Mickey Spillane's iconic hardboiled private detective Mike Hammer. The film was a follow-up to another television film first aired in 1981, Margin for Murder, in which the fictitious gumshoe was portrayed by Kevin Dobson. The Dobson film, which did not lead to a series, marked the first time the character was depicted on the small-screen since Darren McGavin played the part in the black-and-white version of Mickey Spillane's Mike Hammer, a syndicated television series (1958–1960). Murder Me, Murder You was the first of two pilots featuring Keach in the part - the other being More Than Murder (1984) - that blazed a path for the 1980s version of the CBS series Mickey Spillane's Mike Hammer, which debuted on January 28, 1984.

== Plot ==
Mike is hired to protect Chris Jameson (Michelle Phillips), an old flame who he hasn't seen in almost 20 years. Chris heads up an all female high-risk courier agency that has become tied up in a dangerous exchange involving high-stakes bribes by an American helicopter manufacturer to a corrupt General in Central America. Chris nonetheless drops dead in the middle of testifying before a grand jury, but not before informing Mike that he has a 19-year-old daughter, Michelle Jameson (Lisa Blount), who is caught in the middle of everything and might already be dead.

== Cast ==
- Stacy Keach as Mike Hammer
- Tanya Roberts as Velda
- Don Stroud as Pat
- Delta Burke as Paula
- Tom Atkins as Vance
- Jonathan Banks as Saracen
- Kent Williams as Barrington
- Lisa Blount as Michelle Jameson
- Michelle Phillips as Chris
- Bert Rosario as Duardo
- Randi Brooks as Arla
- Lee Meredith as Marty
- Ric Mancini as Cal Pope
- Eddie Egan as Hennessey
- Madison Arnold as Conlin
- Ava Lazar as Janice
- James Arone as Bumppo
- Michelle Avonne as Betty Beraldo
- Julie Hayek as Second French Courier
- Quin Kessler as Karen Marshall
- William Vincent Kulak as Paramedic
- Carol Pritikin as Receptionist #2
- Timothy Stack as Natty
- Michael A. Andrews as Isadora Shepperton

== Accolades ==
Screenwriter Bill Stratton was awarded the Edgar in the category of Best Mystery Teleplay Special, the first time any Spillane-inspired material was ever given the MWA's top award.

== Stacy Keach's first appearance as Mike Hammer ==
The TV movie is significant because it marks the first appearance of Stacy Keach in the role of Hammer. After the second pilot movie, which served as the initial episode of the first CBS series, Keach would go on to star in a third made-for-TV movie (The Return of Mickey Spillane's Mike Hammer), which was followed by the return of the series to CBS, now titled The New Mike Hammer. He went on to star in a syndicated series, Mike Hammer, Private Eye, in 1997. In 1996 his voice was featured reading the audiobook version of Spillane's penultimate Mike Hammer novel Black Alley, and Keach continued to portray Mike Hammer in a series of radio novels entitled collectively The New Adventures of Mike Hammer.

== DVD release ==
After almost 25 years, Murder Me, Murder You was released on DVD by Sony Pictures. The DVD comes packaged as a two-DVD set. The second disc featuring the subsequent Mickey Spillane's Mike Hammer pilot More Than Murder.
