= Survival Skills (film) =

2020 American comedy horror film

- Film poster
- Directed by: Quinn Armstrong
- Written by: Quinn Armstrong
- Produced by: Colin West; Michael Orion Downing
- Starring: Stacy Keach; Vayu O'Donnell; Spencer Garrett; Ericka Kreutz
- Distributed by: Cranked Up Films
- Release dates: March 6, 2020 (Cinequest); December 4, 2020 (United States)
- Running time: 84 minutes
- Country: United States
- Language: English

Survival Skills is a 2020 American comedy horror thriller film directed by Quinn Armstrong, starring Stacy Keach, Vayu O'Donnell, and Spencer Garrett. It takes the form of a lost police training video VHS from the 1980s. The story follows the "fictional" character of Jim, the perfect cop, who becomes self-aware and disillusioned with his police training before taking matters into his own hands.

Survival Skills premiered at the Cinequest Film Festival on March 6, 2020. It is set for VOD release in the US by Cranked Up Films on December 4, 2020.
