= The Andy Griffith Show Theme =

Theme music for The Andy Griffith Show

"The Andy Griffith Show Theme" is the theme for the 1960–1968 CBS television sitcom The Andy Griffith Show. It was composed in 1960 by Earle Hagen, who also performs the whistling heard in the theme. Its success resulted in widespread demand in the United States for a commercial recording. In 1961, actor Everett Sloane wrote lyrics for an expanded vocal version of the theme, which in this guise was renamed "The Fishin' Hole". Television music scholar Jon Burlingame called the theme "a classic of musical Americana".

== Background ==
Opening sequence including the theme music

Earle Hagen's involvement in The Andy Griffith Show, which occurred during the most productive years of his career, resulted from his professional relationship with Sheldon Leonard, whom he met in 1953 while working on Make Room for Daddy. Leonard, the show's director and executive producer, eschewed the era's typical use of stock music for incidental use in television programs, a practice he compared to being like "wearing someone else's underwear". Instead, he insisted on having original music composed for each show. Leonard trusted Hagen's skill as a composer and supervised him unobtrusively.

During this period and throughout the 1950s, Hagen had collaborated with Herbert Spencer to compose music for television. They were still partners when they were chosen to work on The Andy Griffith Show in 1960, and had made several failed attempts to compose its theme music during the summer. By the time the show's executive producers, Leonard and Danny Thomas, had sold it to CBS, the partnership of Hagen and Spencer had ended. It was after that point that Hagen devised the theme:

One day I got up and I just thought, here's a guy who's a simple character. And I started whistling a theme. I called a bass guitar-and-drum session at a little studio on Fairfax Avenue, and I whistled the theme. My son, who was eleven years old at the time, did all the finger snapping. I played the demo for [Leonard] and he said, "That's perfect. I'm going to shoot the main title next week and I'll just have Andy and Opie walking by the lake with a couple of fishing rods". That was it. And I've never whistled since.

Although uninvolved with the creation of the theme, BMI credits Spencer as "co-composer". Professional whistler Fred Lowery is sometimes incorrectly credited as having performed the version of the theme used in The Andy Griffith Show, a boast he also made during his tours.

== LP release ==
The success of The Andy Griffith Show led to demand from across the United States for a commercially available recording of its theme music. In 1961, Capitol Records issued an LP album of music from The Andy Griffith Show, which included an expanded version of the theme played by an orchestra conducted by Hagen. According to an interview Andy Griffith gave that October to the Baltimore Sun, Hagen expanded various cues, including the theme music, for the album. Each of these pieces were elongated to approximately three minutes. A vocal version of the theme, with lyrics by actor Everett Sloane, was sung by Griffith under the renamed title, "The Fishin' Hole". Sloane wrote the lyrics after he learned that the theme had none.

== Legacy ==
In their obituary for Hagen, the Los Angeles Times called "The Andy Griffith Show Theme" his most recognizable work and "certainly the most beloved". Fellow television composer Mike Post eulogized him and the theme:

He was one of the first guys to be tune-like in his scoring. And now, anytime you see someone walk down a country road with a fishing pole, you hear him whistling.

Jon Burlingame, a scholar of music for television, called the theme "a classic of musical Americana".

Ron Howard, who co-starred in The Andy Griffith Show, later recalled that classmates would tease him by whistling its theme when he was trying to make free throws during his high school basketball games.
