= Mickey Spillane's Mike Hammer =

Mickey Spillane's Mike Hammer may refer to:

- Mickey Spillane's Mike Hammer (1958 TV series), starring Darren McGavin.
- Mickey Spillane's Mike Hammer (1984 TV series), starring Stacy Keach.
- Mike Hammer, the detective character created by Mickey Spillane

== See also ==
- Michael Hammer (disambiguation)
- Mickey Spillane
