= Ben Powers =

American actor (1950–2015)

- Powers in 1977
- Born: Alton Adelbert Powers; July 5, 1950; New York, New York, U.S.
- Died: April 6, 2015 (aged 64); New Bedford, Massachusetts, U.S.
- Education: Rhode Island School of Design
- Occupations: Actor, comedian
- Years active: 1974–1987
- Known for: Keith Anderson – Good Times

Alton Adelbert Powers (July 5, 1950 – April 6, 2015), known professionally as Ben Powers, was an American actor and comedian. Powers was best known for his role as Keith Albert Anderson, the husband of Thelma Evans, during the sixth and final season of the CBS sitcom Good Times. Powers was also a cast member on the NBC television comedy series Laugh-In (1977–78).

Powers died on April 6, 2015, at age 64 due to liver cancer.

== Biography ==
Powers was born in New York City, in Brooklyn, and raised in Providence, Rhode Island. He attended the Rhode Island School of Design. Powers got his first break in the 1970s with Adrian Hall, director at Trinity Repertory Theater in Providence, Rhode Island, his hometown. In addition to stage acting, Powers did stand-up comedy, performed impressions, and sang standards as well as original music he wrote.

He was discovered by a Hollywood agent in Providence, signed on to do movies, and entertained at the Playboy clubs in Las Vegas, New York, and Boston. After Good Times, Powers guest starred on a number of popular TV dramas and sitcom shows of the 1980s including Gimme a Break!, Flamingo Road, The Greatest American Hero, The New Odd Couple and Laverne & Shirley. Powers was also a regular on the CBS-TV hit detective drama show Mickey Spillane's Mike Hammer in 1984–85, until the star, Stacy Keach, was arrested in London for cocaine smuggling and the show was canceled while Keach did time in England.

Powers left the Hollywood scene at the end of 1985, before the detective series was picked up again. In the early 1980s, Powers appeared in a handful of big-screen films which included Cheech and Chong's Next Movie, Things Are Tough All Over and The Man Who Loved Women as well as a number of made-for-TV movies, mostly in smaller supporting roles.

== Death ==
Powers died of liver cancer on April 6, 2015, at the age of 64 and was cremated.

== Filmography ==
Year	Title	Role	Notes
1975	Great Performances	John	Episode: "Brother to Dragons"
1977–78	Laugh-In	Regular performer	6 episodes
1978–79	Good Times	Keith Anderson	24 episodes
1980	Cheech and Chong's Next Movie	Welfare Black	
1982	Gimme a Break!	Tony	Episode: "Nell's Ex"
1982	Flamingo Road	TV reporter	Episode: "An Eye for an Eye"; Episode: "The Harder They Fall"
1982	Things Are Tough All Over	The Pimp	
1982	Drop-Out Father	Ben Brown	TV movie
1982	The New Odd Couple	Sidepocket Sidney	Episode: "The Hustler"
1982	The Greatest American Hero	Ivan	Episode: "The Price Is Right"
1982–83	Laverne & Shirley	Aaron; Rick West	Episode: "Death Row: Part 1"; Episode: "Here Today, Hair Tomorrow"
1983	The Man Who Loved Women	Al	
1984	Shattered Vows	Tod	TV movie
1984	Uncensored	Skit characters	Direct-to-video
1984–85	Mickey Spillane's Mike Hammer	Moochie	13 episodes
