= Herbert W. Spencer =

Television and film composer (1905–1992)

- Born: Herbert Winfield Spencer; April 7, 1905; Santiago, Chile
- Died: September 18, 1992 (aged 87); Los Angeles, California, U.S.
- Occupations: Composer; orchestrator
- Years active: 1935–1990
- Spouse: Diana
- Children: 4

Herbert Winfield Spencer (April 7, 1905 – September 18, 1992) was a Chilean-born American film and television composer and orchestrator.

== Career ==
Spencer's career in film began in 1935. He gained industry fame when he teamed up with fellow 20th Century Fox orchestrator Earle Hagen in 1953 to create the Spencer-Hagen Orchestra. They recorded albums for an offshoot of the RCA label "X", and Liberty, and also formed a film scoring service called Music Scoring, Inc. (MSI). Spencer and Hagen scored many early sitcoms and other television shows, including The Danny Thomas Show, Where's Raymond?, renamed The Ray Bolger Show, It's Always Jan starring Janis Paige and My Sister Eileen. Earle wrote the underscore, while Herb wrote the arrangements. Occasionally, these chores overlapped, when time permitted. MSI was dissolved about 1960, and Spencer went on to score The Joey Bishop Show. Although Spencer is credited by the BMI as "co-composer" of The Andy Griffith Show Theme, he was not involved in its composition.

Spencer also helped orchestrate such noted film musicals as Holiday Inn (1942), Gentlemen Prefer Blondes (1953), Call Me Madam (1953), Carousel (1956), Funny Girl (1968), and Hello, Dolly! (1969), and received the credit "musical associate" for his work on the film musical Man of La Mancha (1972). He also composed the music for Sol y nieve (1962, a Chilean documentary).

Later in life, Spencer was known mostly for his work assisting composer John Williams as orchestrator (from 1967 to 1990) for many of his film scores, such as the original Star Wars trilogy, E.T. the Extra-Terrestrial and the Indiana Jones film series, and continuing through Home Alone.

He orchestrated the stage musicals The Good Companions (1974, for André Previn), and Thomas And The King (1975, for John Williams). Neither show was a success.

Spencer was also principal orchestrator for the original version of Clash of the Titans (1981).

== Personal life and death ==
Herbert Spencer and his wife, Diana, were married for 53 years and had four children. He died in Los Angeles on September 18, 1992, aged 87.
