= Spencer Garrett =

American actor

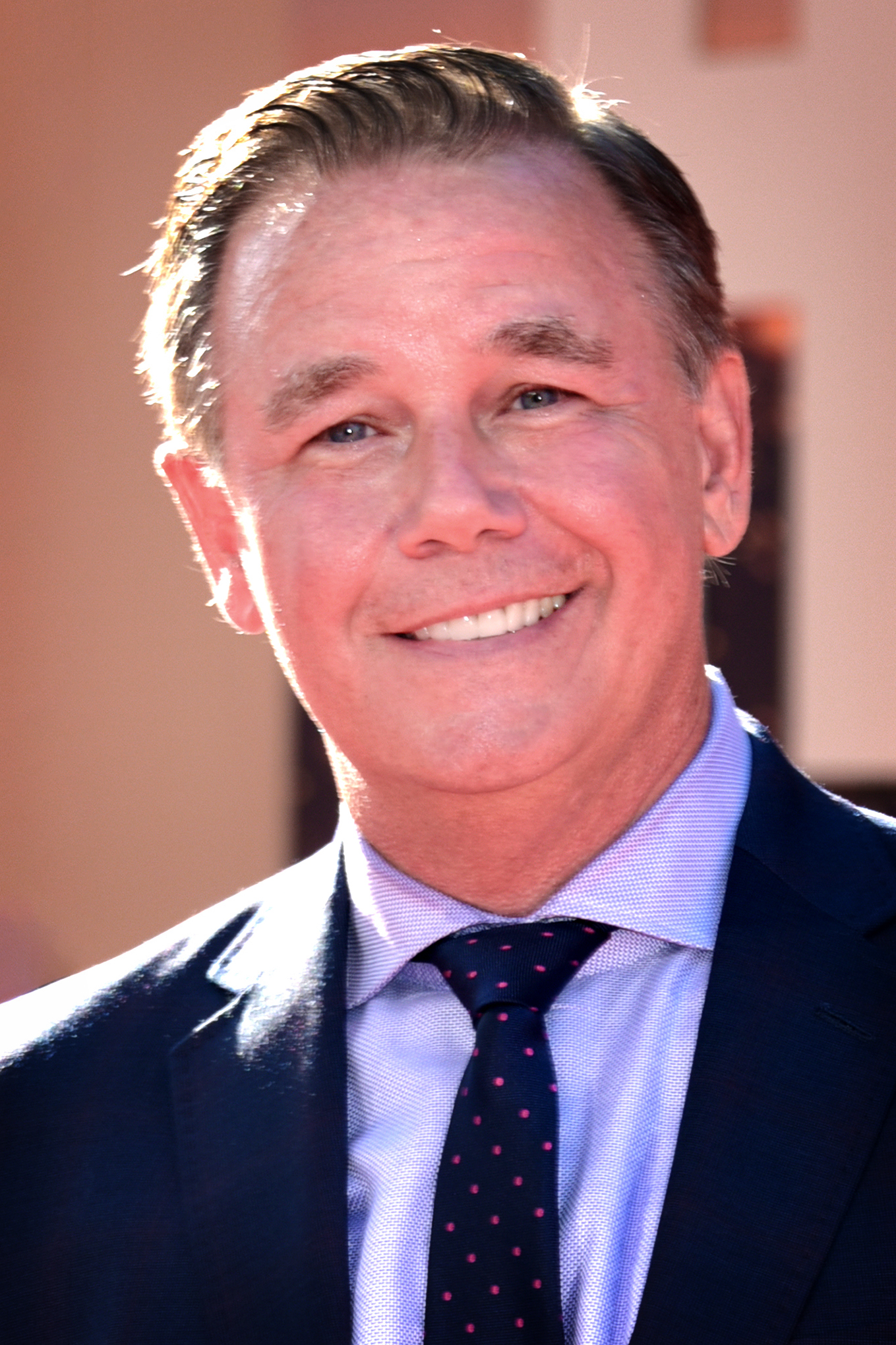
- Garrett in 2019
- Born: September 19, 1963 (age 63); Los Angeles, California, U.S.
- Education: Duke University; Fordham University
- Occupation: Actor
- Years active: 1989–present
- Mother: Kathleen Nolan

Spencer Garrett Heckenkamp (born September 19, 1963) is an American actor. He is best known for his roles in the films Air Force One (1997), 21 (2008), Public Enemies (2009), All the Way (2016), and The Front Runner (2018).

He is the son of actress Kathleen Nolan and personal manager Richard Heckenkamp. He has been in a romantic partnership with CNN news anchor Dana Bash since 2012.

== Filmography ==
=== Film ===
Year	Title	Role	Notes
1994	The Crow	Additional voices	
1995	The Stars Fell on Henrietta	Delbert Tims	
1996	Driven	Business Man #1	
1996	Albino Alligator	Agent #2	
1996	Ghosts of Mississippi	Reporter	
1997	The Apocalypse	Charlie	
1997	George of the Jungle	Male Guest at Party	
1997	Air Force One	White House Aide Thomas Lee	
1997	The Truth About Juliet	Dominic	
1998	Starstruck	Philip	
1998	Permanent Midnight	Brad / Tim from Mr. Chompers	
1999	Dill Scallion	Highway Patrolman	
2001	Lovely & Amazing	Willy	
2003	Dickie Roberts: Former Child Star	Publisher	
2003	House of Sand and Fog	Auctioneer	
2005	Thank You for Smoking	Senator Lothridge	
2005	Wannabe	Kirk Jeraux	
2006	Valley of the Wolves: Iraq	George Baltimore	
2006	Bobby	David	
2007	I Know Who Killed Me	Agent Phil Lazarus	
2007	Charlie Wilson's War	Congressional Committee Member	
2008	21	Stemple	
2008	The Lucky Ones	Pastor Nolan	
2008	Yes Man	Multack	
2009	Transformers: Revenge of the Fallen	Air Force Chief Of Staff	
2009	Public Enemies	Tommy Carroll	
2009	The Consultants	Pete	Also associate producer
2009	Bitter Sweet	Werner	
2010	The Way	Phil	
2010	Casino Jack	Tom DeLay	
2011	Captain America: The First Avenger	Newsreel Announcer	Uncredited
2012	Hitchcock	George Tomasini	
2013	The Truth About Emanuel	Officer Ted	
2013	Decoding Annie Parker	David	
2013	Iron Man 3	Rose Hills Sheriff	
2014	Cesar Chavez	Quinlan	Uncredited
2015	Blackhat	Gary Baker	
2015	No Escape	Recruiter	Scenes deleted
2016	Stevie D	Jack Laurentis	
2018	The Public	John Harper	
2018	The Front Runner	Bob Woodward	
2019	Once Upon a Time in Hollywood	Allen Kincade	
2019	Bombshell	Sean Hannity	
2020	Survival Skills	The Chief	
2022	Blonde	President's Pimp	Uncredited
2023	Your Lucky Day	Mr. Laird	
TBA	Lone Wolf †	Senator William Evans	Post-production

=== Television ===
Year	Title	Role	Notes
1989	Love and Other Sorrows	Sonny Brewster	TV movie
1989	When We Were Young	Unknown	TV movie
1989	Paradise	Lt. Hayes	
1989–1991	Shannon's Deal	Sean Gardner	2 episodes
1990	Dallas	Ensign Malley	
1990	Family of Spies	Aide	
1990	21 Jump Street	Sean Livingston	
1991	Star Trek: The Next Generation	Simon Tarses	Episode: "The Drumhead"
1991	My Life and Times	Peter Hagerty	
1991–1993	Reasonable Doubts	Darren Burke	
1993	Love & War	John Grantham	
1993–1996	Murder, She Wrote	Nicholas Derby / Aaron Woodman	
1994	Dr. Quinn, Medicine Woman	Capt. Arthur Tyrrell	
1994	Someone She Knows	Lt. Harry Kramer	TV movie
1994	Without Warning	Paul Collingwood	TV movie
1995	University Hospital	Tommy	
1995	M.A.N.T.I.S.	Jeffries	
1995	The Watcher	Unknown	
1995	JAG	First Lieutenant Vince Boone	Episode: "Desert Son"
1995	Family Matters	Larry Johnson	
1995–1996	Murder One	Officer / Officer #1	
1996	Smoke Jumpers	Hempstead	TV movie
1996	The Client	McElroy	
1996	Encino Woman	Bobby	TV movie
1996	Promised Land	Young Warren Dempsey	
1997	Moloney	Unknown	
1997	Dark Skies	Ed Hawkins	
1997	Hitz	Tommy Stans	
1998	Four Corners	Unknown	
1998	The Tiger Woods Story	Hughes Norton	TV movie
1998	Oh Baby	Unknown	
1998	Columbo	Roger Gambles	Episode: "Ashes to Ashes"
1998	NewsRadio	G-Man/FBI Agent	Episode: "The Lam"
1998	The Practice	A.D.A. Carter	
1999	Touched by an Angel	Jacob/William Kitchell	Episode: "Into the Fire"
1999	Hard Time: Hostage Hotel	Miles McCurdy	TV movie
1999–2002	Judging Amy	AAG Franklin Dobbs	4 episodes
2000	The X-Files	Harry Bring	Episode: "Sein und Zeit"
2000	Sports Night	Peter Sadler	
2000	Star Trek: Voyager	Weiss	Episode: "Flesh and Blood"
2000–2004	Law & Order	Defense Attorney Stephen Olson	3 episodes
2001	The Weber Show	Jim	
2001	The West Wing	Richard Will	
2001	Just Ask My Children	Alvin McCuan	TV movie
2001	V.I.P.	Rygel	
2001	CSI: Crime Scene Investigation	Mercer's Doctor	
2001–2002	The Invisible Man	Jarod Stark	8 episodes
2002	The District	Stephen McQuade	
2002	The Division	Charlie McBride	
2002	Do Over	Mike Kujakowski	
2003	Crossing Jordan	Paramax Industries Official	
2003	Without a Trace	Spaulding's Defense Attorney	
2003	Dragnet	Roy Wingate	
2003	Strong Medicine	Cal Wallace	
2003	Gary the Rat	Truman Pinksdale (voice)	
2003	American Dreams	Father Patrick	
2003	George Lopez	Unknown	
2003	Carnivàle	Young Balthus	
2003	Miracles	Detective Freemont	
2003	The Lyon's Den	Attorney Emergloch	
2004	Homeland Security	Unknown	TV movie; uncredited
2004	American Family	Unknown	
2004	North Shore	David	
2004	JAG	Commander Andrew Stotler	Episode: "Hard Time"
2004	Las Vegas	Paul Snow	
2004	NCIS	Commander Spencer	
2004	Cold Case	Ben Kern 1983	
2005	Close to Home	Frank Barringer	
2006	E-Ring	Norman 'Doc' Wiley	
2006	Wicked Wicked Games	Mark Gannon	
2007	24	Ben Kram	
2007	Supernatural	Edward Carrigan	Episode: "A Very Supernatural Christmas"
2009	The Mentalist	Michael Elkins	Episode: "Red Rum"
2009	Gary Unmarried	Edward	
2009	Criminal Minds	Det. Bill Lancaster	Episode: "A Shade of Gray"
2009	Three Rivers	Robert Drinkwater	
2009	Lie to Me	Mr. Anders	
2009, 2010	Medium	HR Executive	2 episodes
2010	Burn Notice	Lynch	Episode: "Noble Causes"
2010	Grey's Anatomy	Jim Walker	
2010	The Good Guys	Mike Smith	
2010	Leverage	Mark Vector	Episode: "The Morning After Job"
2010	Nikita	Senator Kerrigan	
2011	Law & Order: Criminal Intent	Paul Keller	Episode: "Rispetto"
2011	Rizzoli & Isles	Bill Sutton	Episode: "Gone Daddy Gone"
2011–2012	Luck	Maurice	3 episodes
2012	The Finder	Ed Scanian	
2012	Game Change	Stephen Biegun	TV movie
2012	NCIS: Los Angeles	Peter Clairmont	Episode: "Blye, K., Part 2"
2012	Harry's Law	Beacon	
2012	Hawaii Five-0	Ted Lansing	
2012	Perception	Howard Reycraft	
2012	BlackBoxTV Presents	Alex's Dad	
2012	Switched at Birth	Ted Rainford	
2013	Castle	Evan Pierce	Episode: "Death Gone Crazy"
2013	Mad Men	Andy Hayes	Episode: "A Tale of Two Cities"
2013	King & Maxwell	George Clark	
2013	Masters of Sex	Beckett	
2013–2014	The Legend of Korra	President Raiko / various (voice)	
2013–2016	Major Crimes	Charles Hardin	
2014	House of Cards	Howard Webb	
2014	Franklin & Bash	Jeff Lisk	
2014	Legends	Senator Clancy Gorman	
2014–2015	Satisfaction	Victor O'Connell	
2015	Scorpion	Wilson Eckherd	
2015	Murder in the First	Dr. Frank Rentman	
2015	Blood & Oil	Myron Stipple	
2015–2016	Aquarius	Hal Banyin	11 episodes
2015–2017	Survivor's Remorse	Clay Beckwith	
2016	All the Way	Walter Reuther	TV movie
2016–2018	The Magicians	Ted Coldwater	
2017	Timeless	Senator Joseph McCarthy	
2017	Insecure	John Merrill	
2017	Room 104	Dr. Dan Benich (voice)	
2017	Dice	Network Producer	
2017	Lethal Weapon	Albert Cook	
2017–2021	Bosch	J. Reason Fowkkes	10 episodes
2018	Unsolved	Commander Ryan	
2018	Code Black	Marshall Barnes	
2019	The Good Doctor	Pastor Clarence	Episode: "Believe"
2019	For the People	Bob Colgate	
2019	How to Get Away with Murder	Alexander Ballast	Episode: "Family Sucks"
2019	Why Women Kill	Hal Burke	
2019	Liza on Demand	Daddy	
2019	How to Get Away with Murder	Alexander Ballast	
2019	Madam Secretary	Alan Canning	2 episodes
2019–2021	For All Mankind	Roger Scott	8 episodes
2020	Project Blue Book	General Ryan Blackstone	
2020	Chicago P.D.	Wade Henslow	Episode: "Buried Secrets"
2020	Dirty John	Judge Spiller	
2020	The Comey Rule	Bill Sweeney	
2021	Heels	Pastor Henry	
2021	Goliath	Mark Schafer	
2022–2023	Winning Time: The Rise of the Lakers Dynasty	Chick Hearn	
2024	Station 19	James Beckett	
2025	The Residence	Wally Glick	

=== Video games ===
Year	Title	Voice role	Notes
2014	Star Wars: The Old Republic: Shadow of Revan	Darth Revan	
