= Jessie Lawrence Ferguson =

American actor (1941–2019)

- Ferguson as Eddie Black in Darkman
- Born: June 8, 1941; The Bronx, New York City, U.S.
- Died: April 26, 2019 (aged 77); Palmdale, California, U.S.
- Occupation: Actor
- Years active: 1979–1995

Jessie Lawrence Ferguson (June 8, 1941 – April 26, 2019) was an American actor. He was best known for playing the self-hating racist police officer in John Singleton's Academy Award-nominated film Boyz n the Hood (1991).

== Biography ==
Ferguson was born in The Bronx, New York, on June 8, 1941. He lived there until the mid-1950s until moving to Chicago, Illinois. His first major role was in Starsky and Hutch in 1979. Ferguson is best known for his roles in Boyz n the Hood and John Carpenter's Prince of Darkness and Sam Raimi's Darkman. He has also had roles in Mike Hammer: Murder Takes All, Star Trek: The Next Generation, The Adventures of Buckaroo Banzai Across the 8th Dimension, All Night Long and The Fish that Saved Pittsburgh. Ferguson retired from acting in 1995 at 54 to focus on his family and his own art. Ferguson died of a heart attack at age 77 on April 26, 2019.

== Filmography ==
=== Film ===
Year	Title	Role	Notes
1979	The Onion Field	Gamblin' Man	
1979	The Fish That Saved Pittsburgh	Jackhammer Washington	
1981	All Night Long	Jacob Horowitz	
1983	Good-bye, Cruel World	Rev. Mike	as Jesse Laurence Ferguson
1984	Amazons	Baker	TV movie
1984	The Adventures of Buckaroo Banzai Across the 8th Dimension	Black Lectroid Commander	
1986	Neon Maniacs	Carson	
1986	The Supernaturals	Recruit #2	
1987	Prince of Darkness	Calder	
1988	The Presidio	Pilot at Travis AFB	
1989	Mike Hammer: Murder Takes All	John McNiece	TV movie
1990	Darkman	Eddie Black	
1991	Boyz n the Hood	Officer Coffey	as Jesse Ferguson
1992	To Protect and Serve	Becker	
1995	The Chosen One	The Magus	Short

=== Television ===
Year	Title	Role	Notes
1979	Starsky and Hutch	Fingers	Episode: "Huggy Can't Go Home"
1980	Buck Rogers in the 25th Century	Lieutenant Rekoff	Episode: "A Dream of Jennifer"
1981	Hill Street Blues	Panhandler	Episode: "Chipped Beef"
1983	Trapper John, M.D.	Locksmith	Episode: "Past Imperfect"
1983	Hotel	Nairobi Business Man	Episode: "Designs"
1984	Remmington Steele	Max Cronin	Episode: "High Flying Steele"
1985	The A-Team	Navarro	Episode: "Skins"
1985	Santa Barbara	M.P. Wilcox	Episode #1169
1985	St. Elsewhere	N/A	Episode: "Cheers"
1985	Still the Beaver	Dr. Maxwell	Episode: "A Boy and his Snake"
1987	CBS Summer Playhouse	Colonel Ntsunge	Episode: "Mickey and Nora"
1987	Star Trek: The Next Generation	Lutan	Episode: "Code of Honor"
1987	Beauty and the Beast	Roy Ocala	Episode: "Dark Spirits"
1990	Equal Justice	Minister	Episode: "Promise to Keep"
1990	Cop Rock	Jerome Brewster	Episode: "Ill-Gotten Gaines"
1992	Swamp Thing	Duchamp	Episode: "Night of the Dying"
1993	South of Sunset	Newspaper Boy	Unknown episode
