= Rubdown (film) =

1993 film by Stuart Cooper

- Directed by: Stuart Cooper
- Starring: Michelle Phillips; Jack Coleman; William Devane
- Country of origin: United States
- Original language: English

Original release
- Network: USA Network
- Release: September 15, 1993

Rubdown is a 1993 Beverly Hills-set television thriller film directed by Stuart Cooper and starring Michelle Phillips, Jack Coleman, William Devane, and Catherine Oxenberg.

== Cast ==
- Michelle Phillips as Jordana Orwitz
- Jack Coleman as Marion Pooley
- Kent Willians as Armstorong
- Alan Thicke as Raymond Holliman
- Catherine Oxenberg as Jordy
- William Devane as Harry Orwitz
- Jack Angeles as Micky
- Michael Ray Miller as Protsky
- Ron Johnson as Theo
- Kane Hodder as Simon

== Plot ==
When a businessman is found dead with a bullet in his head and his wife vanishes, the masseur she was having an affair with becomes a murder suspect. The masseur is former baseball player Marion Pooley (Jack Coleman), who was offered $50,000 by the dead businessman, to sleep with the woman who has disappeared.

== Release ==
The film premiered on the USA Network on September 15, 1993.

=== Critical response ===
Denise McIver of Variety panned the film, writing: "The most disturbing thing about this two-hour cable telefilm is its cynicism and the fact that none of the characters seemed redeemed, or at least changed, by their experiences. This is not to say it won’t hold one’s interest, if only for the scenario, which delivers lots of bare backs, naked legs and superficially steamy sex scenes." Glenn Kenny alternately praised the film, writing: "Despite Rubdown's multiple improbabilities, this story of murder and faked identities is surprisingly absorbing, mostly due to its sassy dialogue."
