= Mike Hammer: Murder Takes All =

1989 film by John Nicolella

- Promotional poster
- Genre: Crime; Mystery; Thriller
- Written by: Mickey Spillane; Rudy Day; Mark Edward Edens
- Directed by: John Nicolella
- Starring: Stacy Keach; Lynda Carter; Lyle Alzado; Michelle Phillips
- Music by: Ron Ramin
- Country of origin: United States
- Original language: English

Production
- Executive producer: Jay Bernstein
- Producer: Jeffrey Morton
- Production locations: Culver City, California; Las Vegas
- Cinematography: Frank Beascoechea
- Editor: Michael Renaud
- Running time: 90 minutes
- Production companies: Jay Bernstein Productions; Columbia Pictures Television; CPT Holdings Inc.

Original release
- Network: CBS
- Release: May 21, 1989

Mike Hammer: Murder Takes All is a 1989 American mystery crime thriller television film. It starred Stacy Keach, Lynda Carter, Lindsay Bloom, Don Stroud, Michelle Phillips, Lyle Alzado, and Jim Carrey. It was filmed in Culver City, California and Las Vegas, Nevada. The film premiered on May 21, 1989 on CBS.

== Plot ==
Mike Hammer is asked to Las Vegas by an entertainer named Johnny Roman and, when he refuses, is abducted there. Johnny denies that it was his doing and explains that the reason he wants Hammer's help is that the singer, Barbara Leguire, has stolen something from him.

While Hammer is a guest at the Hilton casino, he receives an anonymous request to meet a person at a wedding chapel, the person turns out to be wealthy socialite Helen Durant. Soon after, Johnny is killed in an explosive booby trap and somebody plants evidence that points to Hammer. As he tries to clear his name, Barbara is also murdered, and once again, Hammer is the prime suspect. During his investigation, he falls from the hotel roof while chasing a suspect. Hospitalised, he meets a doctor named Carl Durant who asks who had bailed him out of jail. The answer turns out to be Helen, Durant's wife.

After Hammer discharges himself from hospital, he meets Amy Durant and Carl's accountant, Brad Peters. When Hammer goes searching for clues and tries to gain entrance to the Hilton's control room, he is arrested and sent to the security officer supervisor, Leora Van Treas, who reveals to him that his attacker was William Bundy. Later, Brad sets up a trip for Mike to Bundy's ranch, Rosy Buttes, where is abandoned in the desert after a fight with Bundy and is rescued by a biker. When Hammer returns with Brad to the ranch, they find Bundy murdered and have to flee from the policemen who come to investigate.

They soon find a prospector's cabin and call Amy to pick them up in her car. Amy later tells Mike that Johnny Roman was her biological father, though Carl was the man who raised her. Hammer finds out that Helen lied to him about the true identification of Amy's father, so he seeks for Helen at Carl's clinic. There Helen explains that Johnny took advantage of her when she was a young chorus girl, but says that she married Carl during her pregnancy. Now she has to buy back Johnny's diary, which has details in it of a later affair she had with him. She has to avoid the damage that a scandal would do to the children's clinic at which she works. Hammer goes to collect the diary but is ambushed by two riflemen, both of whom he shoots. After his return, Helen decides to hide out in her yacht and asks Hammer to come and guard her.

The next day, Carl and Brad arrive seeking an account book which Hammer had mixed up with Johnny's diary. Carl goes looking for Helen but is killed by a booby-trapped door that causes the entire yacht to explode. Hammer had saved himself by jumping overboard and, after he gets to the dock, realises that Helen is still alive. It now becomes clear that the account book and diary were false clues and that Johnny and Carl were stealing money from the telethon bid on which they were working prior to their deaths. Helen had instigated all the murders in revenge for her treatment.

Hammer confronts Helen with her motives and she attempts to commit suicide, but Hammer had removed the bullets from the gun earlier and thus Helen is arrested. Her daughter Amy now has to face up to the fact that her real and supposed parents have been living a lie. Hammer tells her that she must rely on herself in the future and leaves the ransom money from Helen's case as a donation to the work of the defrauded charity clinic.

== Cast ==
- Stacy Keach as Mike Hammer
- Lynda Carter as Helen Durant
- Lindsay Bloom as Velda
- Don Stroud as Captain Pat Chambers
- Jim Carrey as Brad Peters
- Stacy Galina as Amy Durant
- Lyle Alzado as Reggie Diaz
- Royce D. Applegate as Bundy
- Jessie Lawrence Ferguson as John McNiece
- Edward Winter as Johnny Roman (credited as Ed Winter)
- Michelle Phillips as Leora Van Treas
- Michael Ray Bower as Velda's nephew
- Paul Petersen as Stanfield
- John Calvin as Carl Durant
- Kelly Jerles as Barbara Leguire
