= Earle Hagen =

American composer (1919–2008)

- Hagen in the 1960s

Background information
- Born: Earle Harry Hagen; July 9, 1919; Chicago, Illinois, U.S.
- Died: May 26, 2008 (aged 88) Rancho Mirage, California
- Genres: Soundtrack
- Occupation: Composer
- Years active: 1939–2008

Earle Harry Hagen (July 9, 1919 – May 26, 2008) was an American composer who created music for films and television. His best-known TV themes include The Dick Van Dyke Show, I Spy, That Girl and The Mod Squad. He is also remembered for composing and whistling the theme to The Andy Griffith Show; writing the instrumental song "Harlem Nocturne" used as the theme for television's Mickey Spillane's Mike Hammer; and co-writing the theme song to Tim Conway's Western comedy Rango.

== Biography ==
Born to a Jewish family in Chicago, Illinois, as a boy he moved with his family to Los Angeles, California, where he learned to play the trombone in junior high school, and graduated from Hollywood High School. At age 16, he left home to join traveling big bands, playing with Tommy Dorsey, Benny Goodman and Ray Noble. While working with Noble in 1939, he wrote "Harlem Nocturne" as a tribute to Duke Ellington and Johnny Hodges. The piece was recorded by many artists, including Johnny Otis, Randy Brooks, Herbie Fields, Sam "The Man" Taylor, Earl Bostic, Charlie Barnet, The Viscounts, King Curtis, Quincy Jones, Les Elgart, Larry Elgart, Illinois Jacquet, and David Sanborn. Later, in a version with Bud Shank on alto sax, it was used as the theme for television's Mickey Spillane's Mike Hammer, and The New Mike Hammer.

He began teaching trombone in the 1930s in order to make extra money. In 1940, he went to work for CBS as a staff musician, then enlisted in the military in 1941. Hagen was an orchestrator and arranger for motion picture studio 20th Century Fox in the 1940s and early 1950s, and worked on films like Call Me Madam, Gentlemen Prefer Blondes and Carousel. He began writing for television when he left Fox in 1952 with partner Herbert W. Spencer. The two did the musical score for Janis Paige's short-lived sitcom, It's Always Jan, which aired in the 1955–1956 season on CBS. Hagen met television show producer Sheldon Leonard when he scored the Danny Thomas series Make Room for Daddy.

Hagen's most ambitious body of work, however, came from his work on I Spy, for which he won an Emmy in 1968. Sheldon Leonard, the producer and creator of I Spy, bucked the trend of using canned music for television shows and instead decided to create original soundtracks for every episode. Since every episode of I Spy was set in a different location, Hagen made liberal use of world music in his soundtracks which were mostly written and performed within the West coast jazz genre. (Hagen did not claim the West coast jazz affiliation for himself, instead inventing the term "semi-jazz", which he defined as a union of global themes with American jazz.)

Other television theme songs that Hagen composed were the themes for My Sister Eileen, The Dick Van Dyke Show, Gomer Pyle, U.S.M.C., That Girl (along with I Spy, Thomas and Leonard productions), and The Mod Squad. His film work included the scores for Spring Reunion (1956) and The New Interns (1964).

He was the in-house composer for the 1970s television series Eight Is Enough (1977–1981).

At the end of his life he continued teaching and wrote books on music arranging and scoring. Sometimes his only fee was a box of golf balls because of his passion for golfing. He wrote one of the first textbooks on scoring, Scoring for Films: A Complete Text. In 2000, he published his autobiography, Memoirs of a Famous Composer Nobody Ever Heard Of. Two of his students were fellow Emmy-winning composers and orchestrators Bruce Babcock and Harvey Cohen

Hagen was married for 59 years to Elouise "Lou" Sidwell, a former big-band singer, until her death in 2002. They had two sons, James and Deane Hagen. He married his second wife, Laura (Gunn) Roberts, in 2005.

Hagen died of natural causes in Rancho Mirage. He is buried at Desert Memorial Park in Cathedral City, California.

Hagen had a Golden Palm Star on the Palm Springs Walk of Stars dedicated to him in 2003. He was inducted into the Television Academy Hall of Fame in 2011.

== Published works ==
- 1971 – Scoring for Films: A Complete Text. – Los Angeles, California: Alfred Publishing Company. ISBN 0-88284-388-5
- 1990 – Advanced Techniques for Film Scoring: A Complete Text. – Los Angeles, California: Alfred Publishing Company. ISBN 0-88284-447-4
- 2000 – Memoirs of a Famous Composer Nobody Ever Heard Of. – Philadelphia, Pennsylvania: Xlibris. ISBN 0-7388-5720-3
