= Gary Nelson (director) =

American television and film director (1934–2022)

- Born: October 6, 1934; Los Angeles, California, U.S.
- Died: May 25, 2022 (aged 87); Las Vegas, Nevada, U.S.
- Occupation: Director
- Years active: 1962–2000
- Notable work: Freaky Friday; The Black Hole
- Spouse: Judi Meredith (m. 1962; died 2014)
- Children: 2

Gary Nelson (October 6, 1934 – May 25, 2022) was an American television and film director. He directed many television series, including Get Smart, Gunsmoke, Have Gun – Will Travel, The Patty Duke Show, Gilligan's Island and Happy Days. In addition, Nelson directed five feature films, including Disney's Freaky Friday (1976), and many television movies, including Murder in Coweta County starring Johnny Cash and Andy Griffith.

In 1978, Nelson was nominated for an Primetime Emmy Award for Outstanding Directing for a Drama Series on Washington: Behind Closed Doors.

Nelson was born in Los Angeles, California. He was married to actress Judi Meredith, who died on April 30, 2014; the couple had two sons.

During semi-retirement, Nelson continued to occasionally guest lecture at the University of Nevada, Las Vegas. He died in Las Vegas of congestive heart failure on May 25, 2022, at the age of 87.

== Filmography ==
- Secrets of the Pirate's Inn (1969)
- Bayou Boy (1971)
- Molly and Lawless John (1972)
- Santee (1973)
- The Girl on the Late, Late Show (1974)
- The Boy Who Talked to Badgers (1975)
- Freaky Friday (1976)
- Washington: Behind Closed Doors (1977)
- The Black Hole (1979)
- The Pride of Jesse Hallam (1981)
- Jimmy the Kid (1982)
- Murder in Coweta County (1983)
- Murder Me, Murder You (1983)
- More Than Murder (1984)
- The Baron and the Kid (1984)
- Murder in Three Acts (1986)
- Allan Quatermain and the Lost City of Gold (1986)
- Noble House (1988)
- Shooter (1988)
- Get Smart, Again! (1989)
- The Lookalike (1990)
- The Return of Ironside (1993)
- Melanie Darrow (1997)
