= Lindsay Bloom =

American actress

Lindsay Bloom is an American actress and beauty pageant titleholder.

Bloom is a native of Omaha, Nebraska. After graduating from Omaha Central High School in 1968, she attended the University of Utah.

In 1972–73, Bloom was featured on The Dean Martin Show in the second edition of the Dingaling Sisters.

In 1975, Bloom was cast in the lead role of an American International Pictures drive-in theatre fare, Sixpack Annie, about a "beer-guzzling, truck-driving Southern belle", in a scanty wardrobe. "Some of the language I use is pretty salty", she said. "That and the nude scene is why they gave it an 'R' rating." She played the lovely switchboard operator, Maybelle, on frequent episodes of The Dukes of Hazzard. She also had roles in Cover Girl Models (1975), Hughes and Harlow: Angels in Hell (playing Jean Harlow) (1978), French Quarter (1978), The Main Event (1979), H.O.T.S. (1979) and The Happy Hooker Goes Hollywood (1980).

Bloom was cast as detective Mike Hammer's secretary Velda in Mickey Spillane's Mike Hammer and The New Mike Hammer. In 1985, she appeared in the NBC television film Bridge Across Time.

Bloom married Mayf Nutter, an actor and singer.
