= Stacy Keach =

American-Polish actor (1941–2026)

- Keach as Mike Hammer in Murder Me, Murder You, 1983
- Born: Walter Stacy Keach Jr. June 2, 1941; Savannah, Georgia, U.S.
- Died: November 10, 2026 (aged 85); Magdalenka, Poland
- Citizenship: United States; Poland (since 2015)
- Education: University of California, Berkeley; Yale University; London Academy of Music and Dramatic Art
- Occupation: Actor
- Years active: 1962–2026
- Spouses: Kathryn Baker (m. 1964, divorced); Marilyn Aiken (m. 1975; div. 1979); Jill Donahue (m. 1981; div. 1986); Małgorzata Tomassi (m. 1986)
- Children: 2
- Parents: Stacy Keach Sr.; Mary Peckham
- Relatives: James Keach (brother)
- Website: gostacykeach.com

Walter Stacy Keach Jr. (June 2, 1941 – November 10, 2026) was an American-Polish actor. He was the elder son of theatre director Stacy Keach Sr., and the brother of actor James Keach. Known for his roles on stage and screen, his accolades include four Drama Desk Awards and a Golden Globe Award, as well as nominations for a Primetime Emmy Award and Tony Award. He is an inductee of the Theatre Hall of Fame and was honored with a star on the Hollywood Walk of Fame in 2019.

He made his film debut in The Heart is a Lonely Hunter (1968) before acting in films such as Fat City (1972), Brewster McCloud (1970), Doc (1971), The Life and Times of Judge Roy Bean (1972), The New Centurions (1972), Luther (1974), The Ninth Configuration (1980), The Long Riders (1980), Batman: Mask of the Phantasm (1993), Escape from L.A. (1996), American History X (1998), The Bourne Legacy (2012), Nebraska (2013) and Jay Kelly (2025). He also played Sergeant Stedenko in Cheech & Chong's films Up in Smoke (1978) and Nice Dreams (1981).

Keach portrayed Ernest Hemingway in the miniseries Hemingway (1988), which earned him a Golden Globe Award as well as a nomination for a Primetime Emmy Award. He was further Globe-nominated for playing title role in the series Mickey Spillane's Mike Hammer (1984–1987). He also starred in sitcoms Titus (2000–2002) and Man with a Plan (2017–2020), was the narrator for the docu-series American Greed (2007–2023), and took recurring roles in Prison Break (2005–2007), Two and a Half Men (2010), Blue Bloods (2016–2024) and The Blacklist (2019–2023).

On stage, he made his Broadway debut in 1965 in the Georg Büchner play Danton's Death and was nominated for the Tony Award for Best Actor in a Play for his role as Buffalo Bill in the Arthur Kopit play Indians (1970). He earned four Drama Desk Awards for his performances in productions of the plays MacBird! (1967), Indians (1970), Long Day's Journey into Night (1971), and Hamlet (1973).

== Early life and education ==
Keach's 1959 senior yearbook photo at Van Nuys High School

Walter Stacy Keach Jr. was born in Savannah, Georgia, on June 2, 1941, to Mary Cain (née Peckham), an actress, and Stacy Keach Sr., a theatre director, drama teacher, and actor with dozens of television and theatrical film credits billed as "Stacy Keach". The younger Keach was born with a cleft lip and a partial cleft of the hard palate, and he underwent numerous operations as a child. Throughout his adult life he usually wore a mustache to hide the scars. He was the honorary chairman of the Cleft Palate Foundation and advocated for insurance coverage for surgeries.

Keach graduated from Van Nuys High School in the San Fernando Valley near Los Angeles in June 1959, where he was class president, attended the American Legion's Boys State summer program of California, then earned two BA degrees at the University of California, Berkeley (1963): one in English, the other in Dramatic Art. He earned a Master of Fine Arts at the Yale School of Drama in 1966 and was a Fulbright Scholar at the London Academy of Music and Dramatic Art.

While studying in London, Keach met Laurence Olivier, his acting hero.

== Career ==
=== Theatre ===
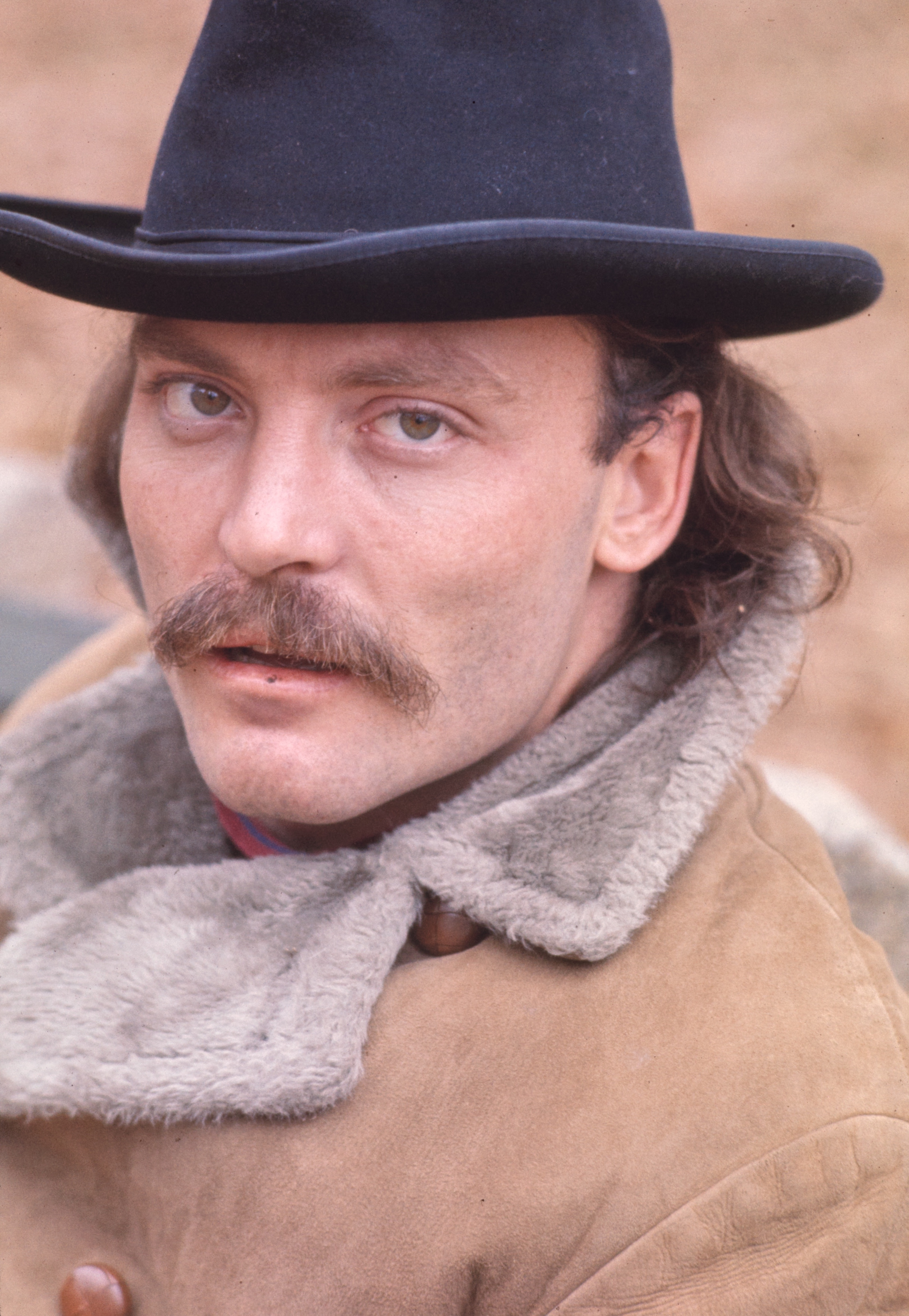
Keach in 1969

He first distinguished himself in Off-Broadway productions and was a prominent figure in American theatre, particularly as a noted Shakespearean. Keach was the recipient of several theatrical accolades, including four Drama Desk Awards and two Helen Hayes Awards. He was nominated for a Tony Award for Best Actor in a Play for his performance in Arthur Kopit's 1969 production of Indians, and twice nominated for the Obie Award for Distinguished Performance by an Actor.

Keach played the title role in MacBird!, an Off-Broadway anti-war satire by Barbara Garson staged at the Village Gate in 1966. In 1967, he was cast, again Off-Broadway, in George Tabori's The Niggerlovers with Morgan Freeman in his acting debut. To this day, Freeman credits Keach with having taught him the most about acting. In 1967, Keach also starred in We Bombed in New Haven, a play by Joseph Heller that premiered in New Haven at the Yale Repertory Theatre and later was produced on Broadway. Keach first appeared on Broadway in 1969 as Buffalo Bill in Indians by Arthur Kopit. Early in his career, he was credited as Stacy Keach Jr. to distinguish himself from his father. He played the lead actor in The Nude Paper Sermon, an avant-garde musical theatre piece for media presentation, commissioned by Nonesuch Records by composer Eric Salzman.

During the late 1960s and early 1970s, Keach established himself as a leading American classical stage actor. His work with the New York Shakespeare Festival at Central Park's Delacorte Theater included Falstaff in both parts of Henry IV (1968) and the title role in Peer Gynt (1969). He returned in 1972 to play Hamlet in Gerald Freedman's production. Reviewing the performance in The New York Times, Clive Barnes called it “one of the great Hamlets of our time” and described Keach as “the finest American classic actor since John Barrymore.”

He won numerous awards, including Drama Desk Awards and Vernon Rice Awards. In the early 1980s, he starred in the title role of the national touring company of the musical Barnum, composed by Cy Coleman. In 1991 and 1996 he won Helen Hayes Awards for Outstanding Actor for his work in Richard III and Macbeth with the Shakespeare Theatre Company. In 1998, he was one of the three characters in a London West End production of 'Art' with David Dukes and George Wendt.

In 2006, Keach performed the lead role in Shakespeare's King Lear at the Goodman Theatre in Chicago. In 2008, he played Merlin in Lerner and Loewe's Camelot, done with the New York Philharmonic. In the summer of 2009, Shakespeare Theatre Company remounted the production of King Lear at Sidney Harman Hall in Washington, D.C., for which Keach won another Helen Hayes Award for Outstanding Actor.

Keach played the title role in two separate productions of Hamlet.

In 2008 and 2009, Keach portrayed Richard M. Nixon in the U.S. touring company of the play Frost/Nixon.

On December 16, 2010, Keach began performances as patriarch Lyman Wyeth in the off-Broadway premiere of Jon Robin Baitz's acclaimed new play Other Desert Cities. The production transferred to Broadway's Booth Theatre, where it opened November 3, 2011.

He was a founding member of L.A. Theatre Works. Keach performed leads in many productions with the company, including 'Willy Loman' in Death of a Salesman and 'John Proctor' in The Crucible.

He was scheduled to return to Broadway in December 2014 in the revival of Love Letters at the Brooks Atkinson Theatre alongside Diana Rigg, but the production closed before Keach and Rigg began their runs.

Keach was scheduled to play Ernest Hemingway in Jim McGrath's one-man play Pamplona at the Goodman Theatre in Chicago from May 30 to June 25, 2017. Keach appeared in previews of Pamplona, from May 19 through May 28, and was well received by audiences. On opening night, he suffered a mild heart attack on stage and the next day, Keach had heart bypass surgery. On June 2, the Goodman Theatre announced that the entire run would be canceled after Keach's doctors advised a period of rest and recuperation.

Keach returned to the role at The Goodman one year later, from July 10 through August 18, 2018. Keach said it would fulfill an obligation "to the play, to the city and to myself".

=== Film ===
Keach with his wife Malgosia Tomassi and U.S. president Ronald Reagan at the White House in 1986

Keach's early fîlm roles included The Heart is a Lonely Hunter (1968), Brewster McCloud (1970), Doc (1971), and The Life and Times of Judge Roy Bean (1972). He played a rookie policeman in The New Centurions (1972), opposite George C. Scott. That year he also starred in Fat City, a boxing film directed by John Huston. He was the first choice for the role of Damien Karras in the 1973 movie The Exorcist; after a few screen tests the role was given to Jason Miller. He went on to play Kane in the 1980 movie The Ninth Configuration, written and directed by Exorcist author William Peter Blatty; this role was itself intended for Nicol Williamson.

He was narrator of the 1975 Formula One racing documentary One by One by Claude du Boc. He portrayed Martin Luther in the 1974 film Luther. He played leading roles in two British films in the mid-1970s: Conduct Unbecoming (1975) and The Squeeze (1977). He played Cheech & Chong's police department nemesis Sgt. Stedenko in Up in Smoke (1978) and Nice Dreams (1981). In 1978, he played a role of explorer and scientist in Slave of the Cannibal God, co-starring former Bond girl Ursula Andress. The film became a cult favorite as a "video nasty". Another one of his screen performances was as Frank James (elder brother of Jesse) in The Long Riders (1980). His brother James played Jesse James. Keach starred in the 1981 Australian thriller Roadgames alongside Jamie Lee Curtis. In 1982, Keach starred in Butterfly with Pia Zadora and Orson Welles. In the 1993 movie Body Bags he played a man who is obsessed with hair.

Keach had a voice role in the 1993 animated feature film Batman: Mask of the Phantasm, based on the popular TV show Batman: The Animated Series. He played Commander Mac Malloy in Escape from L.A. (1996), alongside Kurt Russell, and portrayed a white supremacist in American History X (1998), alongside Edward Norton and Edward Furlong. In Oliver Stone's 2008 biographical film W., Keach portrays a Texas preacher whose spiritual guidance begins with George W. Bush's AA experience, but extends long thereafter.

He also starred in the TV film Ring of Death (2008) playing a sadistic prison warden who runs an underground fight club where prisoners compete for their lives. He had a voice role in the movie Planes (2013) as Skipper Riley, main character Dusty Crophopper's flight instructor. He reprised the role in Planes: Fire & Rescue (2014).

Late in his career, Keach appeared in supporting roles in films such as The Bourne Legacy (2012), Alexander Payne's Nebraska (2013), If I Stay (2014), Truth (2015), Gold (2016) and Gotti (2017). In his final role, Keach appeared as the father of the titular character in Jay Kelly (2025), directed by Noah Baumbach.

=== Television ===
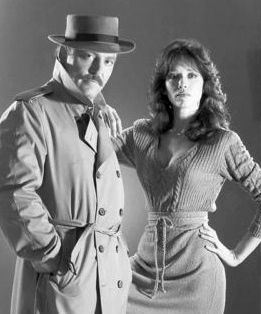
Keach as Mike Hammer and Tanya Roberts as Velda in Murder Me, Murder You in 1983

Keach's first regular television role was as Lieutenant Ben Logan, the lead character in Caribe (1975). He portrayed Barabbas in the 1977 miniseries Jesus of Nazareth, directed by Franco Zeffirelli, and Jonas Steele, an Army scout with psychic abilities, in the 1982 CBS miniseries The Blue and the Gray. From 1984 to 1987, he portrayed Mike Hammer in the CBS television series Mickey Spillane's Mike Hammer and The New Mike Hammer. He reprised the role in the syndicated series Mike Hammer, Private Eye, which aired from 1997 to 1998. In 1988, Keach starred as Ernest Hemingway in the made-for-television film Hemingway, earning him a Golden Globe Award and a nomination for a Primetime Emmy Award. He also hosted segments for the Encore Mystery premium cable network in the late 1990s and 2000s.

In 2000, Keach began playing Ken Titus, the father of the title character, in the Fox sitcom Titus. He voiced Duff Brewery president Howard K. Duff VIII in several episodes of The Simpsons, including "Hungry, Hungry Homer", "Old Yeller-Belly", "Marge and Homer Turn a Couple Play", and "Waiting for Duffman". He also voiced Robert Vance, a deceased businessman resurrected as an artificial intelligence, in the Batman Beyond episode "Lost Soul". He guest-starred in a 2005 episode of the sitcom Will & Grace and had a recurring role as Warden Henry Pope in the Fox drama Prison Break. In 2006, Keach appeared in the Hallmark Channel miniseries Blackbeard, directed by Kevin Connor and starring Angus Macfadyen, Richard Chamberlain, David Winters, and Jessica Chastain. In 2010, he had a recurring role in the comedy Two and a Half Men. In 2011, he co-starred as Pops, the father of the protagonist, in the boxing drama Lights Out.

In November 2013, Keach appeared in the episode "Old School" of the Fox comedy Brooklyn Nine-Nine. In February 2015, Keach began appearing as Cassius Pride, the father of NCIS agent Dwayne Pride, on NCIS: New Orleans. He played Bob, the father of the main character, in the 2016 sitcom Crowded. From 2016 until the series ended in 2024, he had a recurring role as Archbishop Kevin Kearns on the CBS drama Blue Bloods, appearing in 11 episodes. In 2017, Keach began appearing as Joe Burns, the father of Adam Burns (played by Matt LeBlanc), on Man with a Plan. He became a series regular in its third season. He also portrayed Robert Vesco, a former mentor of Raymond Reddington, on the television series The Blacklist.

=== Narrator ===
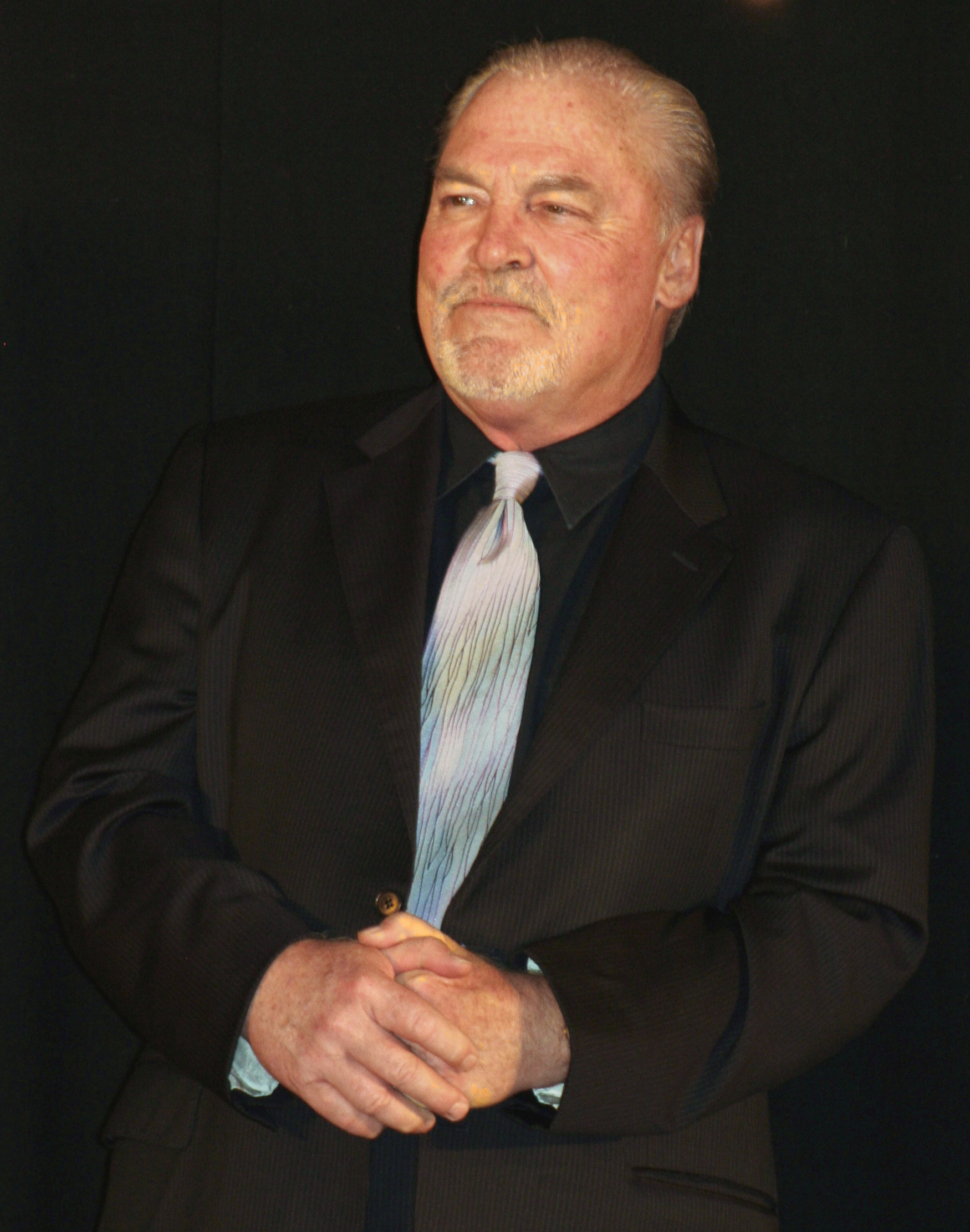
Keach in 2007

Keach narrated several episodes of Nova, National Geographic, and various other informational series. From 1989 to 1992, he was host and narrator of the syndicated informational reenactment show, Missing Reward, which had a similar format to the popular Unsolved Mysteries at the time. From 1992 to 1995, he became the voice-over narrator for the paranormal series Haunted Lives: True Ghost Stories.

From 1999 to 2007, he served as the narrator for the NBC video clip show World's Most Amazing Videos, which was later seen on Spike TV. For the PBS series American Experience, he narrated The Kennedys, among others. Keach could also be heard narrating the CNBC series American Greed, from its 2007 inception to the 2022–2023 season. From 2002 to 2012 he was hosting The Twilight Zone radio series.

In 2008, Keach once again reprised his famous role as Mike Hammer in a series of full-cast radio dramatizations for Blackstone Audio. (He also arranged and performed the music for the audio dramas. His wife, Malgosia Tomassi, also starred in the dramas, playing Maya Ricci, a yoga instructor.) Keach also read many of Mickey Spillane's original Mike Hammer novels as Audiobooks.

He played the role of John in The Truth & Life Dramatized Audio Bible, a 22-hour audio version of the RSV-CE translation of the New Testament. He also voiced both Job and Paul the Apostle in The Word of Promise, a 2007 dramatic audio presentation based on the New King James Version.

On January 6, 2014, Keach became the official voice of The Opie and Anthony Channel on SiriusXM Satellite Radio (Sirius Channel 206, XM Channel 103).

=== Music ===
Keach was an accomplished pianist and composer. He sang backing vocals on the Judy Collins hit song "Amazing Grace". He is also credited with co-writing a song, "Easy Times", on the Judy Collins live album Living.

He provided music for the film Imbued, directed by Rob Nilssen. Keach also completed composing the music for the Mike Hammer audio radio series, "Encore For Murder", written by Max Collins, directed by Carl Amari, and produced by Blackstone Audio.

== Personal life and death ==
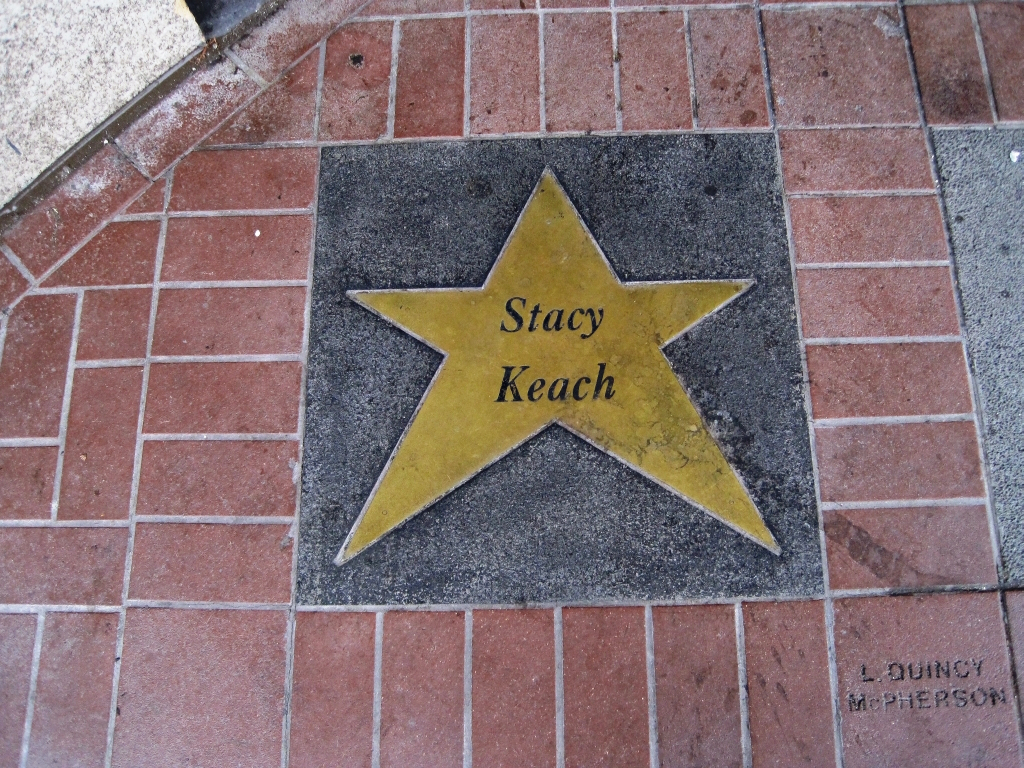
Keach's star at the Orpheum Theatre, 2010

Keach was married four times: to Kathryn Baker in 1964, to Marilyn Aiken in 1975, to Jill Donahue in 1981, and to Małgorzata Tomassi in 1986. Tomassi is a Polish former fashion model and actress who later worked as an interior designer. Keach met her on the set of Mickey Spillane's Mike Hammer, and they performed together in various Mike Hammer-related television shows, including Mickey Spillane's Mike Hammer, The New Mike Hammer, and later Mike Hammer, Private Eye.

He had two children with Małgorzata: son Shannon Keach and daughter Karolina Keach. In 2015, Keach became a Polish citizen.

His brother James is an actor and television director.

Keach was a Roman Catholic.

Keach died from heart failure complicated by heart disease at his home in Magdalenka, Poland, on November 10, 2026, at the age of 85.

=== Legal issues ===
In 1984, Customs and Excise officers arrested Keach at Heathrow Airport for importation of cocaine. Keach pleaded guilty, and served six months at Reading Prison. Keach stated that his time in prison, which he described as the lowest point of his life, and the friendship he formed with a priest during that time led to his conversion to Catholicism. Subsequently, he and his wife met Pope John Paul II.

== Acting career ==
=== Film ===
Year	Title	Role	Notes	Ref.
1968	The Heart Is a Lonely Hunter	Blount	Credited as 'Stacy Keach Jr.'	
1970	End of the Road	Jacob Horner		
1970	The Traveling Executioner	Jonas Candide		
1970	Brewster McCloud	Abraham Wright		
1971	Doc	Doc Holliday		
1972	Fat City	Billy Tully		
1972	The New Centurions	Roy Fehler		
1972	The Life and Times of Judge Roy Bean	Bad Bob		
1974	Luther	Martin Luther		
1974	The Gravy Train	Calvin		
1974	Watched!	Mike Mandell / 'Sonny'		
1975	Conduct Unbecoming	Cpt. Harper		
1976	Street People	Charlie Hanson		
1976	The Killer Inside Me	Lou Ford		
1977	The Squeeze	Jim Naboth		
1977	The Duellists	Narrator (voice)		
1978	The Greatest Battle	Maj. Mannfred Roland		
1978	Gray Lady Down	Cpt. Bennett		
1978	Slave of the Cannibal God	Prof. Edward Foster		
1978	Up in Smoke	Sgt. Stedenko		
1978	Two Solitudes	Huntley McQueen		
1980	The Ninth Configuration	Col. Vincent "Killer" Kane		
1980	The Long Riders	Frank James	Also writer and executive producer	
1981	Roadgames	Patrick Quid		
1981	Nice Dreams	Sergeant Stedenko		
1982	Butterfly	Jess Tyler		
1982	That Championship Season	James Daley		
1990	Class of 1999	Dr. Bob Forest		
1990	Milena	Jesenski		
1990	False Identity	Ben Driscoll / Harlan Errickson		
1993	Sunset Grill	Harrison Shelgrove		
1993	Batman: Mask of the Phantasm	Carl Beaumont, Phantasm (voice)		
1994	Raw Justice	Deputy Mayor Bob Jenkins		
1994	New Crime City	Wynorski		
1996	Escape from L.A.	Cdr. Mac Malloy		
1996	Prey of the Jaguar	The Commander		
1997	The Sea Wolf	Cpt. Wolf Larsen		
1997	Future Fear	Gen. Wallace		
1998	American History X	Cameron Alexander		
1998	Sea Devils	Cpt. Savienko		
1999	Children of the Corn 666: Isaac's Return	Dr. Michaels		
1999	Fear Runs Silent	Mr. Hill		
2000	Unshackled	Warden Kelso		
2000	Icebreaker	Bill Foster		
2000	Militia	George Armstrong Montgomery		
2000	Mercy Streets	Tom		
2001	Sunstorm	General John Parker		
2003	When Eagles Strike	General Thurmond		
2004	The Hollow	Claus Van Ripper		
2004	Caught in the Headlights	Mr. Jones		
2004	Galaxy Hunter	3V3		
2004	El Padrino: The Latin Godfather	Governor Lancaster		
2005	Man with the Screaming Brain	Dr. Ivanov		
2005	Keep Your Distance	Brooks Voight		
2006	Come Early Morning	Owen Allen		
2006	Jesus, Mary and Joey	Jack O'Callahan		
2007	Honeydripper	Sheriff		
2007	The Pixar Story	Narrator		
2008	W.	Earle Hudd		
2009	Chicago Overcoat	Ray Berkowski		
2009	The Boxer	Joe		
2010	A Turtle's Tale: Sammy's Adventures	Grandpa Sammy/Narrator (voice, American version)		
2011	Weather Wars	Marcus Grange		
2011	Cellmates	Warden Merville		
2011	Jerusalem Countdown	Jackson		
2012	The Great Chameleon	Max		
2012	The Bourne Legacy	Adm. Mark Turso		
2013	Ooga Booga	Judge Marks		
2013	Planes	Skipper Riley (voice)		
2013	Planes	Tom Stinger (voice)	Polish-language dubbing; guest cameo	
2013	Nebraska	Ed Pegram		
2014	Planes: Fire & Rescue	Skipper Riley (voice)		
2014	Sin City: A Dame to Kill For	Alarich 'Kraut' Wallenquist		
2014	If I Stay	Grandpa		
2015	Truth	Lt. Col. Bill Burkett		
2016	Cell	Charles Ardai		
2016	Gold	Clive Coleman		
2017	Girlfriend's Day	Gundy		
2018	Gotti	Aniello Dellacroce		
2020	Survival Skills	The Narrator		
2024	Lost & Found in Cleveland	Will Sokolowski		
2025	Jay Kelly	Mr. Kelly		

=== Television ===
Year	Title	Role	Notes	Ref.
1964	Channing	The Colleague	Episode: "The Face in the Sun"	
1967	The Winter's Tale	Autolycus	Television film	
1968	Macbeth	Banquo	Television film	
1971	NET Playhouse	Wilbur Wright	Episode: "The Wright Brothers"	
1973	Incident at Vichy	—N/a	Television play, director	
1973	The Man of Destiny	Napoleon Bonaparte	Television film	
1974	All the Kind Strangers	Jimmy Wheeler	Television film	
1974	Great Performances	Chorus	Episode: "Antigone"	
1975	Caribe	Lieutenant Ben Logan	13 episodes	
1976	Dynasty	Matt Blackwood	Television film	
1976	Six Characters in Search of an Author	—N/a	Television play, director	
1976	Lincoln	Politician	Episode: "Crossing Fox River"	
1977	Jesus of Nazareth	Barabbas	2 episodes	
1978	The Fitzpatricks	Unnamed Character	Episode: "The New Fitzpatrick"	
1978	Saturday Night Live	Man In Cold As Ice	Episode: "Christopher Lee/Meatloaf"	
1980	A Rumor of War	Major Ball	2 episodes	
1982	The Blue and the Gray	Jonas Steele	3 episodes	
1983	Princess Daisy	Prince Alexander 'Stash' Valensky	2 episodes	
1983	Murder Me, Murder You	Mike Hammer	Television film	
1984	Mistral's Daughter	Julien Mistral	4 episodes	
1984	More Than Murder	Mike Hammer	Television film	
1984–1987	Mickey Spillane's Mike Hammer	Mike Hammer	Main role	
1986	The Return of Mickey Spillane's Mike Hammer	Mike Hammer	Television film	
1986	Intimate Strangers	Dr. Jeff Bierston	Television film	
1988	Hemingway	Ernest Hemingway	4 episodes	
1989	The Forgotten	Adam Roth	Television film	
1989	Mike Hammer: Murder Takes All	Mike Hammer	Television film	
1989–1992	Missing: Reward	Himself (host)	Documentary	
1991	The Mysteries of the Dark Jungle	Col. Edward Corishant	3 episodes	
1991	Mission of the Shark: The Saga of the U.S.S. Indianapolis	CPT. Charles B. McVay III	Television film	
1992	Lincoln	George McClellan (voice)	Television film	
1992	Haunted Lives: True Ghost Stories	Narrator	Documentary	
1992	Revenge on the Highway	Claude Sams	Television film	
1993	Rio Diablo	'Kansas'	Television film	
1993	Body Bags	Richard Coberts	Television film	
1993	In the Heat of the Night	Wade Hatton	2 episodes	
1994	Against Their Will: Women in Prison	Jack Devlin	Television film	
1994	Texas	Sam Houston	Television film	
1994–2009	ER	Mike Gates	Recurring role	
1995	Young Ivanhoe	Pembrooke	Television film	
1995	Amanda & the Alien	Emmitt Mallory	Television film	
1996	The Pathfinder	Compte Du Leon		
1997	Promised Land	Ned Bernhart	Episode: "Downsized"	
1997	Legend of the Lost Tomb	Dr. William Bent	Television film	
1997	Murder in My Mind	Cargill	Television film	
1997–1998	Mike Hammer, Private Eye	Mike Hammer	Main role; also executive producer	
1997, 2003	Touched by an Angel	Ty Duncan / Maury Hoover	2 episodes	
1998	Planet of Life	Narrator	7 episodes	
1998–2001	Rugrats	Marvin Finster (voice)	3 episodes	
1999	Batman Beyond	Robert Vance (voice)	Episode: "Lost Soul"	
2000	The Courage to Love	Jean Baptiste	Television film	
2000	The Outer Limits	Cord Van Owen	Episode: "The Gun"	
2000–2002	Titus	Ken Titus	Main role	
2001	Lightning: Fire from the Sky	Bart Pointdexter	Television film	
2001	The Zeta Project	Roland De Fleures (voice)	Episode: "The Next Gen"	
2001–2016	The Simpsons	H.K. Duff, Don Bookner (voice)	6 episodes	
2002	The Santa Trap	Max Hurst	Television film	
2002	Girls Club	Harold Falcon	Episode: "Book of Virtues"	
2003	Miracle Dogs	C.W. Aldrich	Television film	
2003	How Do You Change Your Parents?	Richard Henderson	Television film	
2003	Frozen Impact	Pete Crane	Television film	
2003–2005	What's New, Scooby-Doo?	Harold Lind / The Mayor (voice)	2 episodes	
2005	George Lopez	Blaine McNamara	Episode: "George Stare-oids Down Jason"	
2005	Will & Grace	Wendell Schacter	Episode: "From Queer to Eternity"	
2005–2007	Prison Break	Henry Pope	Main role	
2006	Desolation Canyon	Samuel Kendrick	Television film	
2006	Fatal Contact: Bird Flu in America	Secretary Collin Reed	Television film	
2006	Blackbeard	Captain Benjamin Hornigold	Television film	
2006	Death Row	John Elias	Television film	
2007	ER	Mike Gates	3 episodes	
2007–2023	American Greed	Narrator	Main role	
2008	Lone Rider	Robert Hattaway	Television film	
2008	Ring of Death	Warden Golan	Television film	
2009	Meteor	Sheriff Crowe	Television film	
2009	The Nanny Express	Reverend McGuiness	Television film	
2010	Two and a Half Men	Tom	4 episodes	
2011	Lights Out	'Pops' Leary	Recurring role	
2011	Bored to Death	Bergeron	2 episodes	
2011	Mater's Tall Tales	Skipper (voice)	Episode: "Air Mater"	
2011	Hindenburg: The Last Flight	Edward Van Zandt	Television film	
2012	30 Rock	Himself	Episode: "Murphy Brown Lied to Us"	
2012–2013	The Neighbors	Dominick Weaver	3 episodes	
2013	Sean Saves the World	Lee Thompson	3 episodes	
2013	1600 Penn	Senator Frohm Thoroughgood	2 episodes	
2013	Anger Management	Ray	Episode: "Charlie and Deception Therapy"	
2013	Brooklyn Nine-Nine	Jimmy Brogan	Episode: "Old School"	
2014	Law & Order: Special Victims Unit	Orion Bauer	Episode: "American Disgrace"	
2014	Enlisted	Patrick	Episode: "Vets"	
2014	Jennifer Falls	Mike	Episode: "Jennifer's Song"	
2014	The Exes	Bill Drake	Episode: "An Officer and a Dental Man"	
2015	Hot in Cleveland	Alex	2 episodes	
2015	Full Circle	Bud O'Rourke	Recurring role	
2015–2019	NCIS: New Orleans	Cassius Pride	Recurring role	
2016	Crowded	Bob Moore	Recurring role	
2016	Blunt Talk	Arthur Bronson	2 episodes	
2016	Ray Donovan	Marty 'The Texan' Swanbeck	2 episodes	
2016–2024	Blue Bloods	Archbishop Kevin Kearns	Recurring role	
2017	Tokyo Trial	Narrator (voice)	4 episodes	
2017–2020	Man with a Plan	Joe Burns	Main role	
2019–2023	The Blacklist	Robert Vesco	Recurring role	
2020	Kidding	Himself	Episode: "The Death of Fil"	

=== Theater ===
Title	Run	Role	Original venue	Notes	Ref.
The Comedy of Errors	07/21/1962-08/30/1962	Antipholus of Syracuse	Oregon Shakespeare Festival		
Henry IV, Part 2	07/22/1962-08/31/1962	Earl of Westmorland	Oregon Shakespeare Festival		
Coriolanus	07/24/1962-09/02/1962	Senator	Oregon Shakespeare Festival		
Henry V	07/27/1963-09/05/1963	Henry V	Oregon Shakespeare Festival		
Romeo and Juliet	07/25/1963-09/07/1963	Mercutio	Oregon Shakespeare Festival		
Love's Labour's Lost	07/26/1963-09/08/1963	Lord Berowne	Oregon Shakespeare Festival		
Hamlet	06/16/1964-07/04/1964	Marcellus / First Player	Delacorte Theater, Off-Broadway		
Danton's Death	10/21/1965-11/27/1965	Performer	Vivian Beaumont Theater, Broadway		
The Country Wife	12/09/1965-01/23/1966	Mr. Horner	Vivian Beaumont Theater, Broadway		
The Caucasian Chalk Circle	03/24/1966-06/18/1966	Performer	Vivian Beaumont Theater, Broadway		
Annie Get Your Gun	08/23/1966-08/27/1966	Sitting Bull	Williamstown Theatre Festival		
You Can't Take It with You	07/01/1966-07/09/1966	Boris Kolenkhov	Williamstown Theatre Festival		
Incident at Vichy	07/12/1966-07/16/1966	Prinz von Berg	Williamstown Theatre Festival		
The Lion in Winter	07/19/1966-07/23/1966	Richard I	Williamstown Theatre Festival		
Marat/Sade	07/26/1966-07/30/1966	Jean-Paul Marat	Williamstown Theatre Festival		
MacBird!	02/22/1967-01/21/1968	MacBird	Village Gate, Off-Broadway		
The Niggerlovers	10/01/1967-10/22/1967	August / The Man	Orpheum Theatre, Off-Broadway		
We Bombed in New Haven	12/04/1967-12/23/1967	Captain Starkey	Yale Repertory Theatre, New Haven		
Henry IV, Part 1	01/29/1968-02/10/1968	John Falstaff	Yale Repertory Theatre, New Haven		
Henry IV, Part 2	01/29/1968-02/10/1968	John Falstaff	Yale Repertory Theatre, New Haven		
Three Sisters	03/04/1968-03/16/1968	Baron Tusenbach	Yale Repertory Theatre, New Haven	Also composer	
Henry IV, Part 1	06/11/1968-08/03/1968	John Falstaff	Delacorte Theater, Off-Broadway		
Henry IV, Part 2	06/18/1968-08/03/1968	John Falstaff	Delacorte Theater, Off-Broadway		
King Lear	11/07/1968-02/12/1969	Edmund	Vivian Beaumont Theater, Broadway		
Peer Gynt	07/08/1969-08/02/1969	Peer Gynt	Delacorte Theater, Off-Broadway		
Indians	05/01/1969-06/08/1969	Buffalo Bill	Arena Stage, Washington, D.C.		
Indians	10/13/1969-01/03/1970	Buffalo Bill	Brooks Atkinson Theatre, Broadway		
Long Day's Journey into Night	04/21/1971-08/22/1971	James Tyrone Jr.	Promenade Theatre, Off-Broadway		
Hamlet	01/21/1972-02/12/1972	Prince Hamlet	Long Wharf Theatre, New Haven		
Hamlet	05/20/1972-07/16/1972	Prince Hamlet	Delacorte Theater, Off-Broadway		
Deathtrap	01/15/1979-09/02/1980	Sidney Bruhl	Music Box Theatre, Broadway	Replacement	
Barnum	05/12/1981-08/22/1981	P. T. Barnum	U.S. tour		
Sleuth	05/03/1988-08/08/1988	Milo Tindle	U.S. tour		
Richard III	09/11/1990-11/10/1990	Richard III	Folger Theater, Washington, D.C.		
Solitary Confinement	11/08/1992-11/29/1992	Richard Jannings	Nederlander Theatre, Broadway		
The Kentucky Cycle	09/11/1993-10/07/1993	Various	Kennedy Center, Washington, D.C.		
The Kentucky Cycle	11/14/1993-12/12/1993	Various	Royale Theatre, Broadway		
An Inspector Calls	05/07/1996-08/04/1996	Arthur Birling	U.S. tour		
A Christmas Carol	12/09/2003-12/27/2003	Ebenezer Scrooge	Cutler Majestic Theatre, Boston		
Finishing the Picture	09/21/2004-11/07/2004	Phillip Ochsner	Goodman Theatre, Chicago		
King Lear	09/09/2006-10/22/2006	Lear	Goodman Theatre, Chicago		
White Christmas	07/08/2007-07/15/2007	General Henry Waverly	Benedum Center, Pittsburgh		
A Love Like No Other	10/02/2008-10/26/2008		Malibu Playhouse, Malibu	Also playwright	
Frost/Nixon	09/30/2008-05/10/2009	President Richard Nixon	U.S. tour		
King Lear	06/16/2009-07/19/2009	Lear	Sidney Harman Hall, Washington, D.C.		
Other Desert Cities	01/13/2011-02/27/2011	Lyman Wyeth	Vivian Beaumont Theater, Broadway		
Other Desert Cities	11/03/2011-06/17/2012	Lyman Wyeth	Booth Theatre, Broadway		
Death of a Salesman	03/16/2011-03/20/2011	Willy Loman	Skirball Cultural Center, Los Angeles		
Uncle Vanya	10/17/2013-10/20/2013	Ivan Petrovich Voinitsky	James Bridges Theater, Los Angeles		
Henry IV, Part 1	03/24/2014-06/07/2014	John Falstaff	Sidney Harman Hall, Washington, D.C.		
Henry IV, Part 2	04/01/2014-05/08/2014	John Falstaff	Sidney Harman Hall, Washington, D.C.		
Love Letters	09/13/2014-12/14/2014	Andrew Makepeace Ladd III	Brooks Atkinson Theater, Broadway		
Pamplona	05/19/2017-05/30/2017	Ernest Hemingway	Goodman Theatre, Chicago		
Pamplona	07/10/2018-08/10/2018	Ernest Hemingway	Goodman Theatre, Chicago		

Other stage credits

- The Devil's Disciple (1963, Yale Drama School) – Richard Dudgeon
- Julius Caesar (1965, London Academy of Music and Dramatic Art) – Brutus
- King Lear (1965, London Academy of Music and Dramatic Art) – Earl of Kent
- Oh, What a Lovely War! (1969, Long Wharf Theatre) – Master of Ceremonies
- Cyrano de Bergerac (1978, Long Beach Theatre Festival) – Cyrano de Bergerac
- Hughie (1980, Royal National Theatre) – Erie Smith
- Idiot's Delight (1986, American National Theater and Academy) – Harry Van
- The Crucible (1988, L.A. Theatre Works) – John Proctor
- The King and I (1989, Benedum Center) – Mongkut
- Camelot (1991, Benedum Center) – King Arthur
- Stieglitz Loves O'Keefe (1995, Morris A. Mechanic Theatre) – Alfred Stieglitz
- Macbeth (1995, Folger Shakespeare Festival) – Macbeth
- Art (1998, London)
- Camelot (2008, Avery Fisher Hall) – Merlyn

== Awards and nominations ==
In 2015, Keach was inducted into the American Theater Hall of Fame. In 2019, he received a star on the Hollywood Walk of Fame.

Award	Year	Category	Work	Result
CableACE Award	1994	Actor in a Dramatic Program	Body Bags	Nominated
Drama Desk Award	1967	Outstanding Performance	MacBird!	Won
Drama Desk Award	1970	Outstanding Performance	Indians	Won
Drama Desk Award	1971	Outstanding Performance	Long Day's Journey into Night	Won
Drama Desk Award	1973	Outstanding Performance	Hamlet	Won
Drama Desk Award	1994	Outstanding Actor in a Play	The Kentucky Cycle	Nominated
Golden Globe Award	1985	Best Actor – Television Series Drama	Mickey Spillane's Mike Hammer	Nominated
Golden Globe Award	1989	Best Actor – Miniseries or Television Film	Hemingway	Won (Note: Tied with Michael Caine for Jack the Ripper.)
Helen Hayes Award	1996	Outstanding Lead Actor, Resident Play	Macbeth	Nominated
Helen Hayes Award	2009	Outstanding Lead Actor, Non-Resident Play	Frost/Nixon	Won
Helen Hayes Award	2010	Outstanding Lead Actor, Resident Play	King Lear	Won
Hollywood Film Award	2016	Ensemble of the Year	Gold	Won
Horrible Imaginings Film Festival	2020	Best Actor in a Feature Film	Survival Skills	Won
Jeff Award	2018	Outstanding Solo Performance	Pamplona	Nominated
Kansas City Film Critics Circle	1972	Best Actor	Fat City	Won (Note: Tied with Marlon Brando for The Godfather.)
Laurel Award	1971	Star of Tomorrow, Male	End of the Road	8th place
Obie Award	1967	Distinguished Performance by an Actor	MacBird!	Nominated
Obie Award	1973	Distinguished Performance by an Actor	Hamlet	Nominated
Primetime Emmy Award	1988	Outstanding Lead Actor in a Limited Series or Movie	Hemingway	Nominated
Satellite Award	2001	Best Actor – Television Series Musical or Comedy	Titus	Nominated
Satellite Award	2019	Mary Pickford Award	—N/a	Won
Oldenburg International Film Festival	2007	Star of Excellence	—N/a	Won
Oldenburg International Film Festival	2007	Honorary Award	—N/a	Won
Outer Critics Circle	2011	Outstanding Featured Actor in a Play	Other Desert Cities	Nominated
San Diego International Film Festival	2003	Lifetime Achievement Award	—N/a	Won
Seattle Film Critics Society	2014	Best Ensemble Cast	Nebraska	Nominated
St. Louis International Film Festival	2010	Lifetime Achievement Award	—N/a	Won
Tony Award	1970	Best Actor in a Play	Indians	Nominated
