= Jay Bernstein =

American media producer (1937–2006)

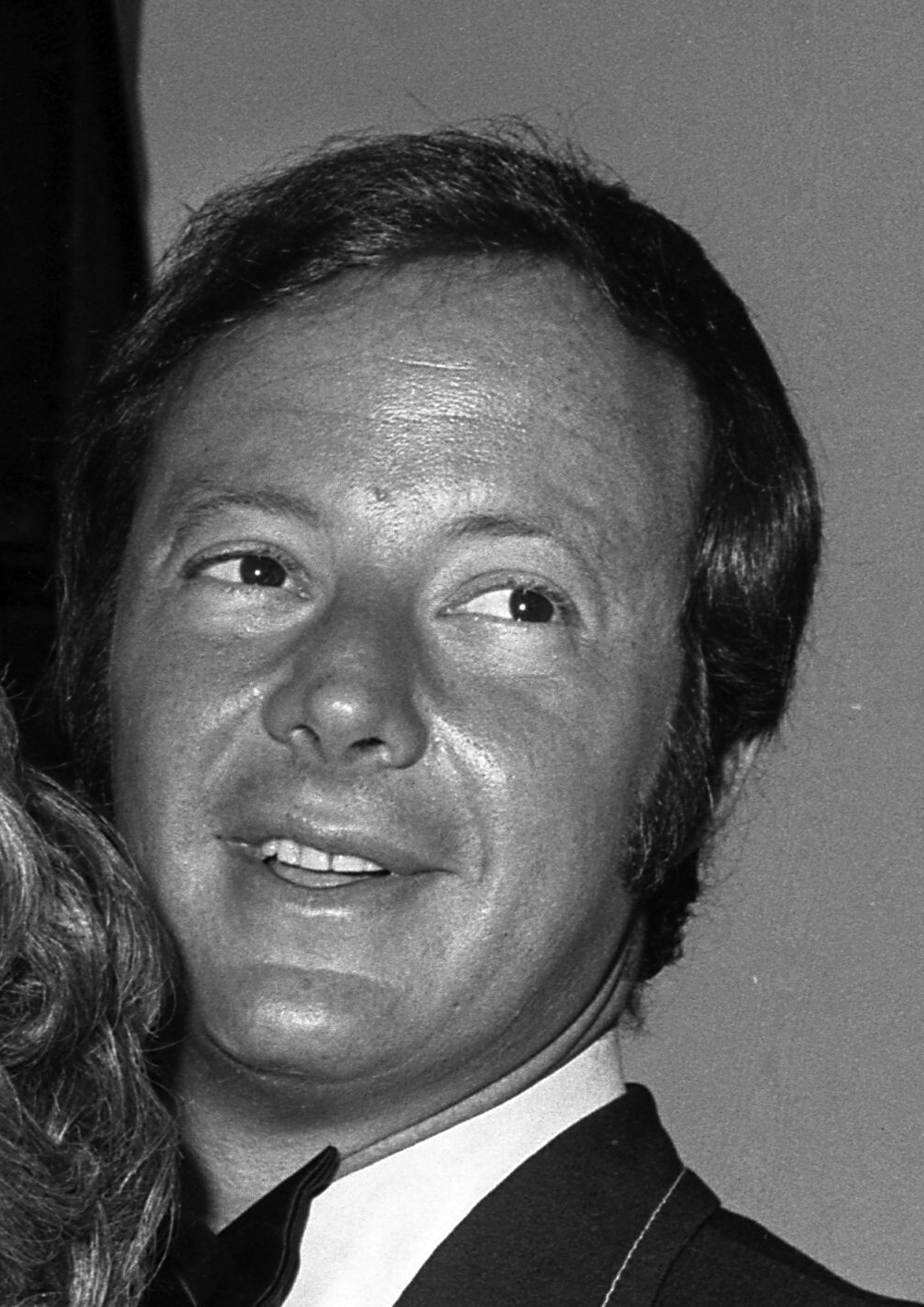
- Bernstein in 1971
- Born: June 7, 1937; Oklahoma City, Oklahoma, U.S.
- Died: April 30, 2006 (aged 68); Los Angeles, California, U.S.
- Occupations: Producer, publicist
- Partner(s): Cabrina Finn (1993–1995); Emrie Brooke Foster (1998); Simona Fusco (1998–2006)
- Children: 1

Jay Bernstein (June 7, 1937 – April 30, 2006) was an American producer and manager to actors, such as Sammy Davis Jr. and Michael Landon, and to actresses, such as Farrah Fawcett and Suzanne Somers.

== Career ==
Born in Oklahoma City, Bernstein moved to California after graduating from Pomona College. He worked in the mail room of the William Morris Agency before working for Rogers & Cowan, the industry's largest PR company, founded by Henry C. Rogers and Warren Cowan. Bernstein founded his own agency in 1962 and later produced the television series Bring 'Em Back Alive, Mike Hammer, and Houston Knights. He also produced several television movies and the film Nothing Personal (1980) starring Suzanne Somers. In 2005, Bernstein had obtained the rights from the City of Los Angeles to produce a brand new prime time TV series entitled Public Defender, based on the true criminal cases from the Los Angeles Public Defender's office from years past.

== Personal life ==
Bernstein married model Sabrina Finn in 1993, and they divorced within two years. He also discovered the 21-year-old European model-turned-actress and entrepreneur Simona Fusco. They became engaged in 1998, when she was 22, and he was 61. She gave birth to his only child; they broke up soon thereafter.

== Death ==
On April 30, 2006, Bernstein died at age 68 after having a stroke.

== Additional information ==
- "Jay Bernstein, Starmaker", of E! True Hollywood Story 2000 TV Episode
