= Jack Stang =

Jack Stang born John A. Stang (October 29, 1923 – January 7, 1996) was an American military veteran and police officer who served as an inspiration for the fictional detective Mike Hammer, created by author Mickey Spillane.

== World War II ==
During World War II Stang was a U.S. Marine who served in the Pacific Theater on Samoa, Guadalcanal and Bougainville. He was wounded in action, and was one of four men in his platoon to survive.

== Newburgh Police ==
Following the war, Stang was a Newburgh, New York policeman where Spillane, then residing at Orange Lake in suburban Newburgh, met him in 1946.

== Bar and grill ==
After leaving the Newburgh Police, Stang operated Stang's, a popular riverfront bar and grill at 4th and Front Street in Newburgh. After it was devastated by a fire, it reopened as a children's clothing store run by Fran Stang, Jack's mother. The old Newburgh riverfront neighborhood, four blocks wide and about a mile long, was demolished in the late 1960s as part of an 'Urban Renewal' program, and the bar property exists as of 2008 as part of a grassy slope and parking lot complex.

== Actor ==
"I had the right guy, Jack Stang, a real cop, only he couldn’t act...(Who would’ve been the best guy to play Mike Hammer?) Jack Stang, if he could act. He was a tough Marine. He went into one Japanese island in the Pacific, with 240 men, he was one of four came out." (We look at pictures of Stang’s screen test, which Mickey wrote) "That’s Jonathan Winters, the comedian, playing the corpse. And that’s me…jeez, did I ever look like that!" —Mickey Spillane, 2002

Stang appeared with Spillane in the 1954 film Ring of Fear and had an unbilled appearance in I, the Jury. Spillane wrote, directed, and filmed a 1955 Mike Hammer screen test with Stang to enable Stang to play Hammer in Kiss Me Deadly. Stang was never able to play Mike Hammer, even though every time Spillane was asked who would be the right person to play Hammer, the answer was always the same: Jack Stang. Hollywood studios at that time would use only known actors so that they could receive financing. Biff Elliot was cast as Hammer in I, the Jury, and Ralph Meeker in Kiss Me Deadly, the second Hammer film.

Jack Stang was signed to Wayne-Fellows Productions at Warner Bros. He also acted in a Highway Patrol episode and Broderick Crawford wanted him to be a regular in the series. He was offered a role by Otto Preminger to be in The Man with the Golden Arm starring Frank Sinatra. Just as Stang's star was about to shine, he left the fast-paced Hollywood lifestyle behind to be with his family.

== In popular culture ==
"Jack Stang" is also the name of the protagonist of Dead Street, the first book published with Spillane's byline after his death (it was "prepared for publication" by Max Allan Collins). The book features a neighborhood being torn down, as was Stang's section of Newburgh.
