= One Lonely Night =

1951 novel by Mickey Spillane

- First edition
- Author: Mickey Spillane
- Language: English
- Series: Mike Hammer
- Release number: 4
- Genre: Detective fiction
- Set in: Manhattan
- Publisher: E. P. Dutton
- Publication date: August 1951
- Publication place: United States
- Media type: Print
- Preceded by: Vengeance Is Mine
- Followed by: The Big Kill

One Lonely Night (1951) is Mickey Spillane's fourth novel featuring private investigator Mike Hammer.

== Plot summary ==
After having been berated by a little judge because of killing somebody who needed knocking off bad, licensed investigator Mike Hammer goes for a walk to contemplate this humiliation on a rainy night in Manhattan and comes across a terrified woman and her pursuer on a bridge. Mike kills the man but the woman, terrified, jumps to her death from the bridge. Both the man and the woman possessed oddly shaped green cards with the edges cut off at odd angles. Hammer's friend in the police department, Captain of Homicide Pat Chambers, identifies them as membership cards for the local Communist Party. Mike attends a meeting and is mistaken for a Soviet MGB spy.

Next day, Chambers tells Hammer that Lee Deamer, a political candidate running on an anti-corruption ticket has an insane twin brother named Oscar who is causing problems and asks Hammer to investigate; but when Hammer goes to Oscar's address, Oscar runs off and throws himself in front of a train, leaving his body unrecognisable.

Lee Deamer tells Hammer that Oscar was trying to blackmail him with documents, now missing, and asks Hammer to recover the documents. Hammer, hindered by the Communists, eventually works out where the stolen papers are and retrieves them.

The Communists kidnap Hammer's secretary, Velda, and try to bargain, her life for the papers. Hammer assaults their hideout, kills them all and rescues Velda.

Finally, Hammer figures out who is the mastermind behind the Soviet plot. He meets with the chief communist, and kills him.

=== Crime fiction ===
This novel illustrates the cardinal features of the subgenre known as hard-boiled crime fiction. The protagonist, Mike Hammer, feels alienated from mainstream society whose values, he feels, are no match for the evil that he must deal with. In the book's opening scene, Hammer walks on a rainy night and reviews the ways in which mainstream society labels him a killer, and he questions whether there is some truth to a judge's denunciation of his actions. He wonders if he is like the evil people he fights.

In hard-boiled crime fiction, commonly the cynical detective narrates in first-person his attempts to deal with a criminal element that the police are ill-equipped to handle, often because the legal system is not up to the task.

== References to real events ==
The trial Hammer attends is the real life Foley Square trial, where members of the Communist Party USA were convicted of infringing the Smith Act. Deamer may be a heavily fictionalised version of Henry A. Wallace. But his strong anti-communist stance, as opposed to the conciliatory approach Wallace championed, suggests that Joseph McCarthy may have been a model.

== Critical response ==
Critics referred to the book as being "angrily anti-communist" and "extremely anti-communist." More recently, some have pointed out that what makes the novel different from other anti-communist literature of the time are both that the communists are portrayed as being "essentially stupid" while also being "extremely threatening," and the theme of the communists overestimating themselves is constant. The novel makes the case, without explicitly saying so, that "the Soviets were stupid and weak, and the seductive power of Communism could easily be exposed as fraudulent." Other more recent reviews point out that the novel is ahead of its time in that it is genuinely anti-racist long before this was fashionable.
