= I, the Jury (1982 film) =

1982 film by Richard T. Heffron

- Theatrical release poster by Drew Struzan
- Directed by: Richard T. Heffron
- Screenplay by: Larry Cohen
- Based on: I, the Jury by Mickey Spillane
- Produced by: Robert H. Solo
- Starring: Armand Assante; Barbara Carrera; Laurene Landon
- Cinematography: Andrew Laszlo
- Edited by: Garth Craven
- Music by: Bill Conti
- Production companies: American Cinema Productions; Larco Productions; Pellepont; Solofilm
- Distributed by: 20th Century Fox (United States and Canada); Warner Bros. (International)
- Release date: October 9, 1982
- Running time: 111 minutes
- Country: United States
- Language: English
- Budget: $11-12 million
- Box office: $1.5 million

I, the Jury is a 1982 American crime thriller film based on the 1947 detective novel by Mickey Spillane. The story was previously filmed in 3D in 1953. Larry Cohen wrote the screenplay and was hired to direct, but—with the film's budget already out of control after one week of shooting—was replaced at short notice by veteran TV director Richard T. Heffron.

== Plot ==
Detective Jack Williams, who lost his left arm in the Tet Offensive, is shot dead in his apartment. His estranged friend, detective Mike Hammer (whose life Jack saved while losing his arm), is warned by police detective Pat Chambers to stay out of it–but nevertheless investigates the matter on his own. He speaks with Jack's widow Myrna, who says that they were attending a sex therapy clinic operated by the glamorous Dr. Charlotte Bennett. Hammer visits the clinic and finds a government-issue bugging device in the doctor's office.

Hammer's secretary Velda identifies Jack's receipts for gasoline near Bear Mountain close to a summer camp run by Hammer's old friend Joe Butler. Mike and Velda visit Joe, who tells them of a military project in Saigon involving the use of drugs to turn prisoners of war into friendly spies and how Captain Romero developed a technique for mind control. Two cars of CIA agents pursue the three on a car chase that ends when Hammer throws a Molotov cocktail at one car, causing it to drive off a cliff into the water, and blocks the road with his vehicle then shoots the second car, causing it to explode.

The FBI trace the gun that killed Jack to special-effects artist Harry Lundee, who had reported the gun stolen. Hammer visits him on set, where Lundee is shot in the back by a projectile knife fired by an unknown assassin and, in his dying breath, confesses that he laundered the gun to mobster Charlie Kalecki, but Kalecki is reluctant to speak with Hammer about any ties to Romero.

The CIA, wishing to distance itself from Romero's experiments, plants a series of clues in an attempt to lead Mike Hammer to Romero in order to have Hammer eliminate Romero for them. Chambers is instructed by the CIA to plant a photo of Romero in Jack's apartment as bait for Hammer and Romero gives Dr. Bennett a fake file about Jack's activities, which Hammer is upset to read during a visit to the Northridge Clinic. Hammer questions the sexual surrogate twins who worked with Jack, before observing Dr Bennett and her sex therapy team at work. While watching this session, Hammer hears the twins being attacked but is too late to prevent their deaths at the hands of a psychotic killer. In the wake of these extreme events, Hammer checks in on Dr Bennett at her practice and the two become lovers.

The twins' killer, Charles Kendricks, has been brainwashed by Romero, who sends him to abduct Velda. Romero's black ops squad capture Hammer, torture him and cover the badly-beaten Hammer with cheap liquor, intending to push him to his death in traffic. Hammer turns the tables on his captors, fights his way free and escapes. He races to Kendricks' apartment and stops him from killing Velda, then pursues Kendricks through the Manhattan streets and shoots him dead. Convinced that Kendricks was a puppet, Hammer confronts Detective Chambers. Chambers, again being secretly instructed by the CIA, tells Hammer that Kalecki supplied the gun that killed Jack and owned the apartment building where Kendricks lived.

Hammer captures Kalecki and forces him to drive back to the Northridge Clinic, where Romero has now set up a sequence of fortifications and death-traps. Hammer jumps out of the car before Romero sets off a mine, instantly killing Kalecki. Hammer kills all of Romero's goons commando-style then climbs over a wall and into the main building to confront Romero. After a brutal fight, Romero wrestles Hammer's gun from him but Hammer has plugged the barrel, so when Romero fires the gun it explodes in his face. Romero dies before Hammer can get the answers he wants about Jack's death. Searching Romero's office, Hammer finds Romero's black ops computer files.

Later, Hammer visits Dr Bennett at her home, bearing an expensively wrapped gift that turns out to be Jack's prosthetic arm. Hammer confronts her with the information he's uncovered: she was the intruder who murdered Jack Williams. Charlotte attempts to seduce Hammer and kill him with a hidden gun but he beats her to it while they embrace, shooting her in cold blood. With her dying breath, Dr. Bennett asks Hammer "How could you?" Using the famous closing line from Spillane's original novel, Hammer responds "It was easy."

== Cast ==
- Armand Assante as Mike Hammer
- Barbara Carrera as Dr. Charlotte Bennett
- Laurene Landon as Velda
- Alan King as Charles Kalecki
- Geoffrey Lewis as Joe Butler
- Paul Sorvino as Detective Pat Chambers
- Judson Scott as Kendricks
- Barry Snider as Romero
- Julia Barr as Norma Childs
- Jessica James as Hilda Kendricks
- Frederic Downs as Jack Williams
- Mary Margaret Amato as Myrna Williams
- F.J. O'Neil as Goodwin
- William G. Schilling as Lundee
- Robert Sevra as Breslin
- Don Pike as Evans
- Timothy Meyers as Blake
- Leigh Harris as 1st Twin
- Lynette Harris as 2nd Twin
- Gwyn Gilliss as Receptionist (as Gwynn Gillis)
- Mike Miller as Victor Kyle
- Alex Stevens as 1st Cab Driver
- Bobbie Burns as Sheila Kyle (as Bobbi Burns)
- M. Sharon Madigan as Bonnie
- Richard Russell Ramos as 2nd Cab Driver
- Norman Blankenship as Kelsey
- Daniel Faraldo as Danny
- H. Richard Greene as Gentleman at Bar
- Felicity Adler as Jogger
- Jodi Douglas as Party Girl
- Lee H. Doyle as Maitre D'
- Cheryl Henry as Brunette
- Michael Fiorello as Man in Revolving Door
- Herb Peterson as Policeman
- Richard Dahlia as Doctor at Clinic
- Aaron Barsky as Guard at Gate
- Ernest Harada as Chef
- Larry Pine as Movie Director
- Joe Farago as Assistant Director
- Alan Dellay as Cameraman
- Jack Davidson as Eric Clavel
- Loring Pickering as Soap Opera Actor
- Corrine Bohrer as Soap Opera Actress

== Production ==
According to screenwriter Larry Cohen, he was originally hired to direct but was fired after expressing his concerns to cast or crew over the producers running out of money. Cohen immediately starting shooting Q - The Winged Serpent in Manhattan, filming concurrently with Richard T. Heffron's completion of I, the Jury. Cohen claimed that "we finished way ahead of them. They went way over budget and the company went bankrupt. They sold the picture at a bankruptcy sale."

== Classification and censorship ==
For its US theatrical release in 1982, the MPAA requested minor cuts to a throat-slashing scene in order to qualify for an R rating.

In advance of its UK theatrical release that same year, on March 3, 1982, the BBFC classified the film as an X (its then-regular over-18 cinema category) after requiring some cuts that toned down the juxtaposition of sex and violence.

When the BBFC re-classified the film for UK home video release on November 11, 1986, using their new 18 category, a total of four minutes of cuts were required to achieve this rating (at that point in British history, the BBFC was very concerned about sexually violent and exploitative material being available at home via VHS cassette). Included in these video cuts were an extended conversation between Hammer and the sexual surrogate twins, orgy scenes at Dr. Bennett's clinic that intercut orgasm with the violent torture of the twins by Kendricks (a psychopathic killer with a cut-throat razor), cuts to a scene where a woman has her throat slit in a Chinese restaurant and the complete removal of Hammer's high-speed cab ride through Manhattan, which had been closely intercut with the sadistic knife torture of Velda by Kendricks.

== Critical reaction ==
The film initially received mixed reviews - some reviewers felt that certain plot lines from the novel had been toned down in favor of nudity, violence and extended action scenes - and observed that Cohen's script contained 1980s-era sub-plots not present in the novel, such as government conspiracies, torture and mind-control techniques (deployed by both the CIA and the Mafia). Others felt that Cohen's CIA/Mafia back-story added a welcome sardonic quality in keeping with the spirit of Spillane and that graphic scenes of sex and gunplay were key to faithfully adapting the fevered narrative of the novel.

The New York Times' Jennifer Dunning enjoyed Assante's casting and found the pulp film highly entertaining:

Along the way there are spectacular chases and ingenious gore, including a water bed that oozes blood. It all ends with Hammer storming a booby-trapped hideaway, alone and without a gun, then slithering through a last little fillip of bloody romance. I, the Jury only aims to entertain. And who cares, with Mr. Assante around?

Roger Ebert praised the movie, Assante and Barbara Carrera - and was particularly impressed with Laurene Landon's performance as Velda:

"I, the Jury" has a few touches all its own, however, and one of them is named Velda. She's Mike Hammer's private secretary, and she is played by Laurene Landon, the tall blonde who was one of the wrestlers in Robert Aldrich's "All the Marbles." She is absolutely, breathtakingly, beautiful. And she has a light comic manner, a way about her, that's really fetching. She's in love with Hammer, but he doesn't give her the time of day. Still, she stays in good cheer, and so do we.

In the decades since its release, Cohen and Heffron's movie has come to be celebrated by the vast majority of Spillane fans, including Spillane's biographer/co-author Max Allan Collins, as an underrated pulp fiction/grindhouse classic, the most faithful screen adaptation of the tone and spirit of Spillane's fevered prose and one of two great Mike Hammer movie adaptations, the other being Robert Aldrich's widely lauded, apocalyptic 1955 Spillane deconstruction Kiss Me Deadly starring Ralph Meeker.

Writing in his 2012 book, "Mickey Spillane on Screen" (co-authored with James L. Traylor), Collins stated:

Assante's performance has a psychotic edge that makes his Hammer, updated or not, the definitive screen portrayal to date of the young Mike Hammer. Somewhere in there with the Brando and Stallone bits is a sense of the Mick himself: Assante has watched Spillane, obviously, and has the bantam walk down pat – as with Biff Elliot and Spillane, Assante confirms that a small, broad-chested Hammer has a bulldog rather than bully quality needed for character empathy in the page-to-screen transfer of the brawling hero. The Assante Hammer is outraged; he's prepared to risk anything for his goal, because his Hammer simply does not give a damn; if he dies in the course of his quest, so be it – "You take life too serious," he advises several terrified unwilling participants in his various war games. Another time he tells Charlotte that he "may take a few suspects out along the way – I'm not perfect." Dat's Mike Hammer, '80s style.

== Home media ==
The film was released uncut on DVD-R in the USA on March 17, 2015, by 20th Century Fox as part of their Cinema Archives collection. It was also released uncut in an upgraded special edition Blu-ray in the USA on November 8, 2016, by Kino Lorber, with a commentary track by film historian Nathaniel Thompson and Cohen biographer/filmmaker/documentarian Steve Mitchell
