= Kiss Me Deadly (disambiguation) =

Kiss Me Deadly is a 1955 American film noir.

Kiss Me Deadly may also refer to:

== Music ==
- "Kiss Me Deadly", a song by Generation X from the 1978 album Generation X
- Kiss Me Deadly (album), a 1981 album by Generation X
- "Kiss Me Deadly" (song), a 1988 song by Lita Ford
  - Kiss Me Deadly, a moniker used by Lita Ford and her band in 2008
- Kiss Me Deadly, a Canadian band featuring Sophie Trudeau
- "Kiss Me Deadly", a song by The Brian Setzer Orchestra from the 2009 album Songs from Lonely Avenue

== Other ==
- Kiss Me, Deadly, a novel by Mickey Spillane
- Kiss Me Deadly (company), British lingerie company
- Kiss Me Deadly (2008 film), an action thriller film starring Robert Gant and Shannen Doherty
- "Kiss Me Deadly", an episode of the TV series Instant Star
