= I, the Jury =

1947 novel by Mickey Spillane

- First edition
- Author: Mickey Spillane
- Series: Mike Hammer
- Genre: Crime fiction
- Publisher: E. P. Dutton (h/b); Signet Books (p/b)
- Publication date: 1947
- Publication place: United States
- Media type: Print (hardback & paperback)
- Followed by: My Gun Is Quick

I, the Jury is the 1947 debut novel of American crime fiction writer Mickey Spillane, the first work to feature private investigator Mike Hammer.

== Plot summary ==
Private detective Mike Hammer is called to the apartment of insurance investigator Jack Williams, a close friend who was crippled saving Hammer's life during shared World War II military service in the Pacific. Losing his arm rendered Jack unfit for police work, so he put his experience to use by investigating insurance fraud. Williams has been murdered in a particularly cruel way, deliberately shot in the stomach to make the death slow and painful. Mike vows vengeance, declaring that Jack's murderer will die the same way Jack did.

Prior to his death, Jack had fallen in love with Myrna Devlin when he stopped her from committing suicide by jumping from a bridge. Williams asked Dr. Charlotte Manning, a young, beautiful, blonde, and well-to-do psychiatrist, to admit Myrna to her clinic for psychotherapy. After Myrna became clean, she and Williams became engaged. The couple maintained a casual friendship with Manning. Over time, Williams comes to suspect that Hal Kines, one of Manning's college students who has spent some time at her clinic and who has become one of her casual acquaintances, is in fact a criminal.

In the course of his investigation, Hammer meets and begins to fall in love with Dr. Manning. In the course of the novel, they become engaged.

Taking time out from his investigation on a Saturday morning, Hammer picks up Myrna Devlin and gives her a lift to an estate in the country, owned by the lovely Bellamy twins, for a gigantic all-day party. Charlotte Manning says she has some business to attend to and will be there in time for a tennis game due to take place that evening. After an unsuccessful attempt at playing tennis himself, Hammer gets rid of his sleep deficit by spending all day in his room, fast asleep, with "old junior" — his gun — close to him. He is woken up just in time for dinner, during which Harmon Wilder, the Bellamys' lawyer, and Charles Sherman, Wilder's assistant, are pointed out to him. This is a fine — and the final — distractor in the novel: Wilder and Sherman are suddenly missing from the party after Myrna Devlin has been found shot. In fact they had illicit drugs on them and did not want to be found out. During the tennis game, Mary Bellamy asks Charlotte if she can "borrow" Hammer. She then leads him into the woods, where they have sex. They return to the party just as a maid discovers Myrna's body in an upstairs room, in front of a large mirror. Both Hammer's friend Pat Chambers and other police are called in, and the alibi of each guest is checked.

Now having another reason to seek vengeance, Hammer redoubles his efforts to discover the killer. Soon he has uncovered a wide-ranging narcotics rings, one that Jack had been on the verge of exposing.

Back home, Hammer retreats into his apartment to think. Finally, he knows the identity of the killer: Dr. Manning. Confronting her, Hammer keeps his promise and kills her in the same excruciatingly painful way she had killed his friend Jack.

When the dying murderer asks Hammer how he could act in such a cruel manner, Hammer replies "It was easy!"

== Reception ==
By the time the book was adapted into a film in 1953, it had sold 3,500,000 copies.

== Films ==
The first film version of I, the Jury was shot in 1953 and was released through United Artists. After a four-picture contract was signed with Spillane, the movie was filmed, in 3-D, featuring Biff Elliot (as Mike Hammer), Preston Foster and Peggie Castle. The plot from the novel was toned down for the film version. It grossed $1,299,000. The cinematographer was John Alton.

In 1982, the story was again made into a movie, this time with Richard T. Heffron directing, and with Armand Assante as Mike Hammer.
