= Black Alley =

1996 novel by Mickey Spillane

- Author: Mickey Spillane
- Language: English
- Genre: Fiction
- Publisher: Dutton
- Publication place: United States
- English publication date: November, 1996
- Pages: 320

Black Alley (1996) is a novel by American author Mickey Spillane, the 13th featuring New York City private investigator Mike Hammer and the final one completed before Spillane's death in July 2006.

Following the author's demise, the first of "five substantial Mike Hammer manuscripts," The Goliath Bone, was completed by his friend and colleague Max Allan Collins and published in 2008. Additional books based on Spillane's unfinished manuscripts have since been released, including Lady, Go Die! (2012), Complex 90 (2013) and King of the Weeds (2014). King of the Weeds is a direct sequel to Black Alley.

== Plot summary ==
The novel begins with Mike Hammer recovering in Florida from bullet wounds he received during his infiltration of a drug war on the docks of New York—injuries from which he almost perished. After being thought dead by all of his close friends and family for a period of eight months, he comes back to Manhattan and resumes his normal, exciting life. When an old army buddy, Marcus Dooley, is on his deathbed, he clues Hammer in on a pot of $89 billion he stole and hid from the dons of the mafia. Young, greedy mobsters are also looking for that money, which they should have inherited, had it not been stolen. Mike Hammer takes on the whole mafia, coolly, and in imperfect health.
