= Kiss Me, Deadly =

1952 detective novel by Mickey Spillane

- First edition
- Author: Mickey Spillane
- Language: English
- Series: Mike Hammer
- Release number: 6
- Genre: Detective fiction
- Set in: New York State
- Publisher: E.P. Dutton
- Publication date: 1952
- Media type: Print
- Pages: 176
- ISBN: 0451165934
- OCLC: 20846644
- Preceded by: The Big Kill
- Followed by: The Girl Hunters

Kiss Me, Deadly (1952) is Mickey Spillane's sixth novel featuring private investigator Mike Hammer. The novel was later loosely adapted into the film Kiss Me Deadly in 1955.

== Plot summary ==
Chapter 1: Speeding down a mountain road coming back from Albany, New York, PI Mike Hammer almost runs over a woman hitch hiking in the middle of the road.

After Mike's car skids to a stop, she gets in the car and they drive to Manhattan only later to be run off the road by gangsters. The gangsters torture the woman for information, which she fails to tell them. They kill her and knock Mike semi-unconscious, and then stuff them both into Mike's car and push the car over a cliff.

Chapters 2-6: Recovering in the hospital, Mike wakes to the sound of Velda's voice. After his release from the hospital, Mike meets with the FBI. Mike learns from Pat Chambers that the woman, Berga Torn, was the mistress of Carl Evello. She was to testify at a committee hearing after she was released from the sanitarium.

Velda's visit to Mike brings bad news: His PI licence was revoked by the Feds. Pat gives Mike the address of Berga Torn in Brooklyn. Berga had a roommate named Lily Carver, who just moved out of the apartment. Mike gets Lily's address from the superintendent and heads to her place.

Protecting herself with a hand gun, Lily lets Mike inside her apartment. Lily was scared to death with all the strangers confronting her with questions about Berga, but Lily does not know a thing. After Lily calms down, Mike tells her to get her things together and come to his place.

Chapters 7-11: Mike seeks more info from Ray Diker of the Globe about the individuals Velda had reported, one of whom is Dr. Martin Soberin, Berga's former medical doctor who put her in the sanatarium. Mike pays a visit to Carl Evello in Yonkers, New York and meets Carl's half-sister Michael Friday. Afterward, Mike goes home, and then is overpowered by two gangsters and made to drive them in his newly acquired car. Using a ploy of an overlooked bomb still in his car, Mike manages to escape his captors.

Velda, having worked undercover, gives Mike the key to Billy Mist's apartment. Mike goes to check it out, and then Mike goes to Al Affia's place on 47th Street, listed under the name Tony Todd, where it appears a struggle had taken place.

Mike has learned that Berga's former friend Nicholas Raymond (formerly Raymondo) was holding back $2 million from the gang. Mike heads to his place, only to be abducted by two gangsters and taken to a place to be tortured.

Mike, tied to bed posts, face down, breaks free of his bonds and kills his captors.

True to the tradition of Mickey Spillane novels, Kiss Me, Deadly ends (Chapters 12-13) in true Mike Hammer fashion.
