= Hy Gardner =

American journalist (1908–1989)

- Hy Gardner on The Hy Gardner Show.
- Born: December 2, 1908; New York City, U.S.
- Died: June 17, 1989 (aged 80); Miami, Florida, U.S.
- Occupations: Journalist; Television personality Game show panelist

Hy Gardner (December 2, 1908 – June 17, 1989) was an American entertainment reporter and syndicated columnist for the New York Herald Tribune, host of Hy Gardner Calling, The Hy Gardner Show, and Celebrity Party, and an original celebrity panelist on the first incarnation of To Tell the Truth, along with Ralph Bellamy, Polly Bergen, Kitty Carlisle and host Bud Collyer. In 1957, Gardner also appeared on the show made up as a clown along with guest-challenger (famous clown) Paul Jung. Gardner also played himself in the 1963 movie The Girl Hunters with writer/friend Mickey Spillane, who included Gardner in several of his Mike Hammer novels.

== Career ==
In the early 1950s, Gardner began interviewing celebrities on the radio on his own show, Hy Gardner Calling. He had wanted to be a columnist for entertainment news as a young boy, and in 1951 he was hired by the New York Herald Tribune where he continued until 1966 when the paper closed. The New York Times described his writing style as an "art form".

In 1953, Marilyn Boshnick became Hy Gardner's secretary. They married in 1958. At that time, Gardner was the interviewer of the guests on Spike Jones's short-lived Club Oasis comedy/variety show on NBC. In 1967, the couple began a gossip column together. Titled Glad You Asked That it was soon syndicated.

Gardner's television interviews began in 1954 and continued until 1965. Mickey Spillane, who cast him in a mystery film in 1963, said upon Gardner's death: "He was an innovator. He did the split screen before Edward R. Murrow." Gardner also provided rocking chairs to help relax his interview guests.

After split-screen interviews were replaced by in-studio interviews, the show was renamed The Hy Gardner Show. The Herald Tribune folded in 1966, and Hy and Marilyn Gardner moved from New York City to Miami. The Hy Gardner Show continued on television, and Celebrity Party debuted on radio and was syndicated. Interviews continued until the mid-1980s.

== Death ==
Gardner died of pneumonia on June 17, 1989, at the North Shore Hospital in Miami. He was 80 years old.
