= Marine Raiders (film) =

1944 film by Harold D. Schuster

- Original film poster
- Directed by: Harold D. Schuster; Robert Wise (additional scenes)
- Written by: Martin Rackin; Warren Duff
- Produced by: Robert Fellows
- Starring: Pat O'Brien; Robert Ryan; Ruth Hussey
- Cinematography: Nicholas Musuraca
- Edited by: Philip Martin Jr.
- Music by: Roy Webb
- Distributed by: RKO
- Release date: June 30, 1944
- Running time: 88 minutes
- Country: United States
- Language: English

Marine Raiders is a 1944 RKO war film showing a fictional depiction of the 1st Marine Raider Battalion and 1st Marine Parachute Battalion on Guadalcanal, R&R in Australia, retraining in Camp Elliott (where much of the film was made) and a fictional attack in the Solomon Islands. Produced by Robert Fellows, and directed by Harold D. Schuster, it stars Pat O'Brien, Robert Ryan, and Ruth Hussey.

The film depicts fictionalized accounts of the Guadalcanal Campaign (1942-1943), the Battle of Edson's Ridge (1942), and the Bougainville Campaign (1943-1945). The Western Desert Campaign (1940-1943) is mentioned as a concurrent event, but not actually depicted on-screen.

== Plot ==
Major Steve Lockhart, commander of a Marine Raider battalion and Captain Dan Craig, commander of the Paramarines are together on Guadalcanal facing a Japanese assault that became the Battle of Edson's Ridge. When Captain Craig discovers the body of one of his lieutenants who had been tortured and executed by the Japanese, he goes on a one-man army kill crazy rampage of revenge in the jungle with his Reising gun (that jams) and his M1911 pistol. Major Lockhart, his enraged commander, criticises Craig for his disgraceful conduct that has no place in combat. The only thing saving Craig from being relieved of his command is the Japanese night attack that is beaten off during a night of hard fighting.

The depleted units go for rest and recreation in Australia. The troubled Craig meets a knowledgeable and sympathetic Flight Officer, Ellen Foster of the Women's Auxiliary Australian Air Force who has two brothers serving in North Africa. The two fall in love and wish to be married but Craig is wounded in a Japanese air attack. When Lockhart visits Craig in the hospital he finds out that he wishes to marry Ellen. Thinking Craig out of his mind, Lockhart transfers him immediately back to the United States.

The recovered Craig and Lockhart are bitter enemies as they report to Camp Elliott. Both are shocked that so many men are being trained as Marines compared to the pre-war size of their highly selective Corps. When told how many men the Corps has recruited, Lockhart exclaims that there aren't that many potential Marines in the entire country. The film shows its audience views of actual training of Marines filmed at the base.

Lockhart ends up defending Craig when he is thought unstable and presses for his return to active service. Preparing for an invasion of an unnamed South Pacific island whilst back in Australia, Craig marries Ellen. Lockhart changes his mind on marriage when meeting her and all are reconciled.

In a fictional assault that a map identifies as Bougainville, Craig's Paramarines jump behind Japanese lines to relieve pressure on a beachhead where Lockhart's Raiders and other Marines have landed. Ellen proudly hears the news of their exploits on radio in Australia.

== Cast ==
- Pat O'Brien as Maj. Steve Lockhart
- Robert Ryan as Capt. Dan Craig. (At the time Robert Ryan was a drill instructor at Camp Pendleton).
- Ruth Hussey as Ellen Foster
- Frank McHugh as Sgt. Louis Leary
- Barton MacLane as Sgt. Maguire
- Richard Martin as Pfc. Jimmy Fowler
- Martha Vickers as Sally Parker (as Martha MacVicar)
- Edmund Glover as Pvt. Miller

== Production ==
Producer Robert Fellows had previously filmed Bombardier and The Iron Major with RKO's contract star Pat O'Brien. O'Brien was impressed by the newcomer Ryan with whom he worked and recommended him to RKO over several other stars for the leading role of Dan Craig. Ryan's performance was noticed by a reviewer of The Nation who compared him to Gary Cooper. Shortly after filming his part, Ryan enlisted in the United States Marine Corps in January 1944, and served as a drill instructor at Camp Pendleton. He was later discharged in November 1945 as a private first class.

The film was made at the Marine base at Camp Elliott, near San Diego, with Captain Clay Boyd as the technical advisor. Boyd, the son of a World War I Marine, was a former enlisted Marine but was commissioned in 1941. He was a platoon commander with the 1st Raider Battalion at Guadalcanal and twice reconnoitered New Georgia prior to the invasion where he was a company commander.

Robert Wise directed pick up and additional scenes. Nicholas Musuraca, famed for his cinematography on many Val Lewton horror films and film noir classics filmed the two battle scenes at night.

Roy Webb's score includes "Bless 'Em All" as a theme for the Australian locales.
