= The Girl Hunters (film) =

1963 British film by Roy Rowland

- Film poster
- Directed by: Roy Rowland
- Written by: Mickey Spillane; Robert Fellows; Roy Rowland
- Produced by: Robert Fellows
- Starring: Mickey Spillane; Shirley Eaton; Lloyd Nolan; Hy Gardner; Scott Peters
- Cinematography: Kenneth Talbot
- Edited by: Sidney Stone
- Music by: Philip Green
- Production companies: Fellane Productions; Present Day Productions, Inc.
- Distributed by: Colorama Features; Zodiac International Pictures
- Release date: 12 June 1963 (Los Angeles premiere)
- Running time: 98 minutes
- Country: United Kingdom
- Language: English
- Budget: $400,000

The Girl Hunters is a 1963 British crime drama film directed by Roy Rowland and starring Mickey Spillane, Shirley Eaton, Lloyd Nolan and columnist Hy Gardner. It was written by Spillane, Robert Fellows and Rowland, adapted from the 1962 Spillane pulp novel of the same name. Exteriors were shot on location in New York with studio scenes in London.

Producer Robert Fellows intended to follow the film with another based on Spillane's 1964 novel The Snake, but the second film was never produced.

== Plot ==
Ever since his assistant Velda went missing, private detective Mike Hammer has been drinking and he is now homeless. Although Hammer hasn't worked a case in seven years, his old police friend Capt. Pat Chambers asks for his assistance on a job. Chambers and Hammer were both in love with Velda, which had ended their friendship. The case involves a senator who has been murdered.

Hammer is needed to talk with Richie Cole, a dying sailor who refuses to speak with anybody else. According to federal agent Art Rickerby, not only has Richie been shot by the same gun recently used to kill a politician, he is actually an undercover federal agent.

Hammer's investigation leads to Laura Knapp, the late senator's widow. She is beautiful and seductive, but Hammer does not trust her. He learns that they are caught in the fallout from a network of spies operating during World War II. Now a killer nicknamed the Dragon is trying to silence people who had information about the spy operation. Hammer finds and kills the Dragon. He confronts Laura with his suspicions about her involvement. Laura fires a shotgun that Hammer had rigged to backfire in order to test her loyalty. It is not clear if Velda is still alive.

== Cast ==
- Mickey Spillane as Mike Hammer
- Shirley Eaton as Laura Knapp
- Scott Peters as Police Captain Pat Chambers
- Guy Kingsley Poynter as Dr. Larry Snyder
- Charles Farrell as Joe Grissi
- Kim Tracy as nurse
- Hy Gardner as himself – the columnist
- Lloyd Nolan as Federal Agent Arthur Rickerby
- Benny Lee as Nat Drutman
- Murray Kash as Richie Cole
- Bill Nagy as Georgie
- Hal Galili as a thug with an ice pick

== Production ==
Spillane recalled meeting crime figure Billy Hill in London and invited him to the film set. According to Spillane, Hill provided firearms that were used in the film. Spillane also noted that the producers surrounded him with actors who were shorter than he was.

== Reception ==
The Monthly Film Bulletin wrote that the film "is mainly an excuse for tough-guy talk about some insane plot for world conquest engineered by the 'commies', and a series of violent, sadistic fights." The publication was critical of Spillane's acting ability but still praised his performance as "the film's main point of interest".

Variety wrote that Spillane "turns in a credible job" as Hammer, and that Rowland managed to get good performances from both the principal cast as well as the secondary actors.

The Radio Times Guide to Films gave the film 2/5 stars, writing: "Author Mickey Spillane plays his own creation, hard-boiled private eye Mike Hammer, in this all-American B-movie that, for tax reasons, was based and financed in Britain. Little is made of a promising plot about murder and corruption in American politics, while Spillane is shown to have more ego than acting talent. British starlet Shirley Eaton plays a blonde femme fatale who, fatally, doesn't know one end of a shotgun from the other."

Leslie Halliwell said: "Comic strip thuggery with the author playing his own slouchy hero; the general incompetence gives this cheap production an air of Kafkaesque menace."
