= My Gun Is Quick (film) =

1957 film by Victor Saville

- Directed by: George White; Victor Saville (as Phil Victor)
- Screenplay by: Richard Collins; Richard Powell
- Story by: Richard Powell (screen story)
- Based on: based on the 1950 novel My Gun Is Quick; Mickey Spillane
- Produced by: George White; Victor Saville (as Phil Victor)
- Starring: Robert Bray
- Cinematography: Harry Neumann
- Edited by: Frank Sullivan
- Music by: Marlin Skiles
- Color process: Black and white
- Production company: Parklane Pictures
- Distributed by: United Artists
- Release date: August 1957
- Running time: 91 minutes
- Country: United States
- Language: English

My Gun Is Quick is a 1957 American film noir crime film directed by George White and Victor Saville (as Phil Victor) and starring Robert Bray. It is based on the 1950 novel of the same name by Mickey Spillane, and features the private investigator character he created, Mike Hammer

== Plot ==
Private investigator Mike Hammer assists a prostitute being assaulted. He cannot help noticing a unique ring on her finger. Later, when she is found murdered that ring is missing. Events lead to a cache of jewelry stolen by the Nazis during World War II and smuggled out of postwar France by an American army colonel, who also tries to find the ring and recover all the other jewels. However, many parties are on the lookout and the private eye runs into big trouble.

== Cast ==
- Robert Bray as Mike Hammer
- Whitney Blake as Nancy Williams
- Donald Randolph as Colonel Holloway (as Don Randolph)
- Richard Garland as Louis
- Fred Essler as Ludwig Teller
- Booth Colman as Capt. Pat Chambers
- Pamela Duncan as Velda
- Genie Coree as Maria (as Gina Coré)
- Patricia Donahue as Dione
- Jan Chaney as Red
- Terence de Marney as Jean (as Terence De Marney)
- Peter Mamakos as La Roche
- Claire Carleton as Nightclub Boss
- Phil Arnold as Shorty

== Critical reception ==
In a non-contemporaneous review, TV Guide noted "The third of UA's Mike Hammer films in the 1950s...the usual number of fisticuffs, killings, and love scenes are presented. This is a lesser work in the series. Though well-crafted, the story is shallow and not really worth the efforts given here. The violence is often senseless and the sex seems to exist only for its own sake. Well produced, but still a boring and tasteless piece." In a synopsis of the film for Allmovie, Hal Erickson wrote, "Not quite as accomplished as Robert Aldrich's classic Mike Hammer yarn Kiss Me Deadly, My Gun Is Quick works well within its modest limits."
