= Robert Fellows =

American film producer (1903–1969)

Robert Fellows or Robert M. Fellows (August 23, 1903 in Los Angeles – May 11, 1969 in Los Angeles) was an American film producer who was once a production partner with John Wayne and later with Mickey Spillane.

== Biography ==
Fellows entered Hollywood through work as an assistant director in 1928, often working with Tay Garnett, and was later a production manager for several films. He became an associate producer, first with Warner Brothers. He went to Universal Pictures as an associate producer on the movie Pittsburgh, which starred Marlene Dietrich, Randolph Scott, and John Wayne, three clients of the producer and agent Charles K. Feldman.

Fellows was hired by RKO Radio Pictures as a producer, with his first film being Bombardier, a topical but fictional account of the Doolittle Raid, starring Scott. His next film was The Fallen Sparrow, a spy drama set in the aftermath of the Spanish Civil War. Fellows fought pressure to change the background to Occupied France from Spain at a time when the United States government was seeking friendly relations with the Spanish State.

Other films Fellows produced for RKO were Tall in the Saddle and Back to Bataan starring John Wayne.

As a producer Fellows again worked with director Tay Garnett on Wild Harvest and A Connecticut Yankee in King Arthur's Court for Paramount Pictures.

In 1952, Wayne and Fellows teamed up to start their own production company, Wayne-Fellows Productions, making (primarily) films starring Wayne, the first one being Big Jim McLain (1952). The following year they produced Island in the Sky (1953). Wayne had seen the venture as a way to produce and direct his own film version of the battle of the Alamo. Eventually, Fellows became embroiled in a complicated divorce from his wife, necessitating the need to sell his half of the company. Wayne bought Fellows out and started his own Batjac Productions.

One of the Wayne-Fellows films was Ring of Fear, featuring Mickey Spillane. Though the film was credited to frequent Wayne collaborator James Edward Grant, Wayne and Fellows felt the screenplay had problems and asked Spillane to rewrite it, which he did over a weekend. When Spillane, who appeared in the film as himself, refused credit for the screenplay, Wayne presented him with a Jaguar.

Fellows produced a film version of Spillane's The Girl Hunters in England in 1963 with Spillane portraying his own creation, Mike Hammer. Fellows had acquired the rights to all of Spillane's work and had planned to film The Snake in 1963, but the project was never produced.

In 1969, just before his death, Fellows and Spillane teamed up to create their own production company, with a plan of filming 21 of Spillane's books, the first being The Delta Factor. The film was completed with Tay Garnett directing.

On television from 1957–1958 Fellows produced 14 episodes of Alcoa Theatre and 12 episodes of Goodyear Theatre.

== Filmography (producer) ==
- Virginia City (1940)
- Bombardier (1943)
- The Iron Major (1943)
- Marine Raiders (1944)
- Step Lively (1944)
- Tall in the Saddle (1944)
- Heavenly Days (1944)
- Having Wonderful Crime (1945)
- Back to Bataan (1945)
- Blaze of Noon (1947)
- Wild Harvest (1947)
- Beyond Glory (1948)
- A Connecticut Yankee in King Arthur's Court (1949)
- Streets of Laredo (1949)
- Red, Hot and Blue (1949)
- Chicago Deadline (1949)
- Let's Dance (1950)
- Appointment with Danger (1951)
- His Kind of Woman (uncredited) (1951)
- Big Jim McLain (1952)
- Hondo (1953)
- Island in the Sky (uncredited) (1953)
- Plunder of the Sun (1953)
- Track of the Cat (uncredited) (1954)
- Ring of Fear (1954)
- The High and the Mighty (co-producer, with Wayne) (1954)
- Screaming Mimi (1958)
- The Girl Hunters (1963)
- The Delta Factor (1970)

== Misc. ==
- Santa Fe Trail (associate producer) (1940)
- They Died with Their Boots On (associate producer) (1941)
- Pittsburgh (contributing writer - uncredited) (1942)
- Pittsburgh (associate producer) (1942)
- The Spanish Main (executive producer) (1945)
- Back to Bataan (executive producer) (1945)
- Big Jim McLain - Marine Boarding Ship (uncredited) (1952)
- This Is Your Life - episode - William Wellman - Himself (1954)
