= The Snake (Spillane novel) =

Novel by Mickey Spillane

- First edition
- Author: Mickey Spillane
- Language: English
- Genre: Novel
- Publisher: E.P. Dutton
- Publication date: 1964

The Snake (1964) is Mickey Spillane's eighth novel featuring private investigator Mike Hammer.

== Plot ==
The novel picks up where The Girl Hunters left off. Hammer has discovered the location of his long-lost love and secretary, Velda. In a race against the clock, Hammer tries to move Velda from the location as soon as possible, only to find that she is harboring a 21-year-old runaway who is fearing for her life. Before they vacate the premises, they are attacked by two assassins, who they later discover are working independently of each other. Hammer quickly dispatches one of the men and severely wounds the other. However, the wounded killer escapes.

Days later, Velda testifies before Congress about the espionage activities carried out by the Butterfly Two group. The Justice Department acts swiftly upon the testimony to round up the remaining operatives in the country, leaving Velda and Mike free and clear to return to their prior lives. After the duo set up shop again in the Hackard Building, Hammer reconciles with his old police buddy, Pat Chambers, after he learns that Velda is still alive. Hammer then devotes his attention to the girl that Velda was harboring, who claims that her stepfather is trying to kill her and also claims he killed her mother.

After investigating several leads on the seedier side of town, Hammer finds himself embroiled in a three-decade-old mystery, involving a botched bank robbery where 3 million dollars in cash went missing. Hammer races to discover the truth behind the identity of the snake before it's too late. Can he save the girl, himself, and Velda?

Robert Fellows had planned on following his film of The Girl Hunters with The Snake but the project was never made.
