= The Body Lovers =

1967 novel by Mickey Spillane

- First edition (publ. Dutton)
- Author: Mickey Spillane
- Publication date: 1967

The Body Lovers (1967) is a novel by American crime writer Mickey Spillane, featuring private investigator Mike Hammer.

== Plot summary ==
This story opens with Mike Hammer moving through the dark streets of the city when he hears a child emit a terrible scream of fear. When he finds the child, he also discovers the nude body of a murdered woman who had been beaten to death with a whip. This begins a complicated and baffling case involving the deaths of additional women, a murdered newspaper reporter who was tracking some aspects of the case, and the sordid life of prostitutes in the city.

The newspaper reporter community and the police department ally themselves with Hammer, but despite all efforts, there are few clues. In typical Hammer style, he creates them.

As the story progresses, Hammer plays the white knight to some women who have reached their depths, pounding a pimp who regularly beats his women into a bloody pulp in order to make the point.

Hammer also uncovers a sadistic ring made up of international figures where women risk their lives for fortune in a desperate attempt to pull themselves up and away from their desperate situation.

In the end, Velda comes through for Hammer and he defeats the ring by literally blowing it away.
