= Survival... Zero! =

1970 novel by Mickey Spillane

- First edition cover
- Author: Mickey Spillane
- Publisher: E. P. Dutton
- Publication date: August 25, 1970

Survival... Zero! (1970) is Mickey Spillane's eleventh novel featuring private investigator Mike Hammer.

== Plot summary ==
A tale of a dead body found of someone considered a nonentity, leading to Mike Hammer combing the city trying to solve it. In the background we hear increasingly about canisters filled with deadly bio-weapons which Soviet agents have left around New York.
