= Big Jim McLain =

1952 film by Edward Ludwig

- Theatrical poster
- Directed by: Edward Ludwig
- Written by: Richard English (story); James Edward Grant; Eric Taylor
- Produced by: Robert M. Fellows; John Wayne
- Starring: John Wayne; Nancy Olson; James Arness
- Cinematography: Archie J. Stout
- Edited by: Jack Murray
- Music by: Paul Dunlap; Arthur Lange; Emil Newman
- Color process: Black and white
- Production company: Wayne-Fellows Productions
- Distributed by: Warner Bros. Pictures
- Release date: September 17, 1952 (New York)
- Running time: 90 minutes
- Country: United States
- Language: English
- Box office: $2.6 million (U.S. rentals)

Big Jim McLain is a 1952 American political thriller film noir directed by Edward Ludwig and starring John Wayne and James Arness as HUAC investigators hunting communists in world of organized labor in postwar Hawaii.

== Plot ==
HUAC investigators Jim McLain and Mal Baxter are sent to Hawaii to track Communist Party activities and gather evidence toward convictions. Their trail leads to insurance fraudsters, saboteurs and infiltrators of labor unions on the Honolulu docks, who interfere with the loading and unloading of ships. After receiving information from a local newspaper reporter, the agents search for Willie Nomaka, a former party treasurer. He is under the care of psychiatrist Dr. Gelster, whose secretary Nancy Vallon proves helpful. McLain asks her for a date and a romance develops.

Nomaka disappears while ostensibly being treated for a nervous breakdown. Nomaka's landlady, the man-hungry Madge, assists in the investigation. Nomaka's ex-wife, a former communist, also provides McLain with some helpful background information. Nomaka is eventually found under an alias at a Honolulu sanatorium, but he is heavily drugged and unable to speak. Party leader Sturak orders Dr. Gelster to kill Nomaka, but McLain rescues him. However, Nomaka's knowledge provides little value. Two communist thugs kidnap Baxter. During an interrogation, Dr. Gelster accidentally kills Baxter while injecting him with sodium pentothal. McLain resolves to follow his mission through to the end.

Sturak orders the members of his party cell to attend a meeting, where he tells Gelster to confess his party membership to local authorities in an effort to fool investigators into believing that the cell has been destroyed. Gelster is reluctant to sacrifice himself for the party. The meeting is suddenly interrupted by the arrival of McLain, who punches Gelster for killing Baxter. Greatly outnumbered, McLain loses the ensuing brawl, but police arrive and place the insurrectionists under arrest.

The men responsible for Baxter's death are convicted of murder. McLain and Nancy see other communists plead the Fifth Amendment to avoid self-incrimination during further HUAC interrogations.

== Cast ==
- John Wayne as Jim McLain
- James Arness as Mal Baxter
- Nancy Olson as Nancy Vallon
- Alan Napier as Sturak
- Vernon "Red" McQueen as Phil Briggs
- Gayne Whitman as Dr. Gelster
- Veda Ann Borg as Madge
- Robert Keys as Edwin White
- Sarah Padden as Mrs. Lexiter

== Reception ==
In a contemporary review for The New York Times, critic Bosley Crowther lamented the film's mixture of a romantic storyline with the seriousness of the communist threat, writing:

It is hard to tell precisely whether the Warners' "Big Jim McLain" ... is supposed to be taken seriously as a documentation of the sort of work that is done by the House Un-American Activities Committee in its investigations of the Communist peril or whether it is merely intended to arouse and entertain. ... For it makes the investigations of a supposedly experienced Congressional sleuth into some Communist activities in Hawaii appear to be nothing more than a minor preoccupation while he seriously woos a pretty girl. To be sure, there are running allusions to some sinister characters who ride in expensive autos and put up at the most exclusive clubs—these being, of course, the inevitable Communist villains in the piece. But John Wayne, who plays the manly hero, doesn't really get around to them until he has spent the better part of the picture seeing the sights of Hawaii and making love to a charmingly compliant Nancy Olson, whom he meets his first day ashore. Then, when he does descend upon them it is a direct, uncomplicated raid in which it is clearly demonstrated that the best medicine for a cowardly Communist is a sock in the nose. ... [T]he over-all mixing of cheap fiction with a contemporary crisis in American life is irresponsible and unforgivable. No one deserves credit for this film.

== See also ==
- John Wayne filmography
