= Ring of Fear (film) =

1954 film

- Original film poster
- Directed by: James Edward Grant; William A. Wellman
- Written by: Paul Fix; Philip MacDonald; James Edward Grant; Mickey Spillane
- Produced by: Robert Fellows; D. Ross Lederman; John Wayne
- Starring: Clyde Beatty; Mickey Spillane; Pat O'Brien
- Cinematography: Edwin B. DuPar
- Edited by: Fred MacDowell
- Music by: Arthur Lange; Emil Newman
- Production company: Wayne-Fellows Productions
- Distributed by: Warner Bros. Pictures
- Release date: July 2, 1954
- Running time: 93 minutes
- Country: United States
- Language: English
- Box office: $1.8 million

Ring of Fear is a 1954 American film noir directed by James Edward Grant and starring Clyde Beatty and Mickey Spillane as themselves. The cast also featured Pat O'Brien, Sean McClory and Marian Carr. Additional scenes were directed by William A. Wellman. It was shot in CinemaScope and Warnercolor. It was designed partly to take advantage of the popular success of the Mike Hammer adaptations produced by Victor Saville for United Artists.

== Plot ==
Dublin O'Malley, an inmate at a mental institution, is swiftly denied release when it is obvious he is still obsessed with Valerie St. Dennis, an aerialist at his former place of employment; The Clyde Beatty Circus. So O' Malley stages an escape and murders a complete stranger and changes clothes with him, The authorities, for the time being, assume he is dead. He returns to his former place of employment---performer/owner Clyde Beatty, unaware of his dangerous past, hires him for the important job of Ringmaster.

Valerie is happily married to fellow aerialist, Armand St. Dennis, and they have a small daughter. Hinting that there is a homicide in his past that he would inform the authorities about; O'Malley blackmails alcoholic clown, Twitchy, into aiding him in acts of sabotage. Because Twitchy is an alcoholic, most of the sabotage attempts result in nothing worse than minor injuries. But a sawed-through restraining leash during Beatty's famous lion/tiger training act is too close a call to ignore. When famous mystery writer, Mickey Spillane, comes to see the show, Beatty recruits him and assistant Jack Stang to investigate matters.

Dublin becomes a suspect when his advances towards the married Valerie become too obvious to ignore. When Twitchy's conscience finally gets the better of him, Dublin drowns him in a water tank after getting him drunk; assuming it will be passed off as an accident or suicide. But Dublin left his fingerprints on the liquor bottle he shared with Twitchy, and his criminal past is revealed. Dublin releases the "Big Cats" to cover his escape. But one especially vicious tiger jumps into the freight car where Dublin is hiding, with fatal results. The unanimous opinion of the performers is that it couldn't have happened to a nicer guy.

== Cast ==
- Clyde Beatty as Himself
- Mickey Spillane as Himself
- Pat O'Brien as Frank Wallace
- Sean McClory as Dublin O'Malley
- Marian Carr as Valerie St. Dennis
- John Bromfield as Armand St. Dennis
- Pedro Gonzalez Gonzalez as Pedro Gonzales
- Emmett Lynn as Twitchy
- Jack Stang as Himself
- Kenneth Tobey as Shreveport
- Kathy Cline as Suzette St. Dennis
- Queenie Leonard as Tillie
- Larri Thomas as Strong Woman
- Karl Wallenda as Trapeze Performer
- Henry Rowland as Lunch Counter Proprietor
- Forrest Taylor as Psychiatrist
- Vince Barnett as Vendor

== Bibliography ==
- Collins, Max Allan & Traylor, James L. Mickey Spillane on Screen: A Complete Study of the Television and Film Adaptations. McFarland, 2018.
