= The Twisted Thing =

1966 novel by Mickey Spillane

- First edition (publ. E.P. Dutton)
- Author: Mickey Spillane
- Language: English
- Publication date: 1966

The Twisted Thing (1966) is Mickey Spillane's ninth novel featuring private investigator Mike Hammer.

Spillane claimed it was based on a true story and he submitted it as the second Mike Hammer novel but it was rejected by his publisher's editor.
