= Sean McClory =

Irish actor (1924–2003)

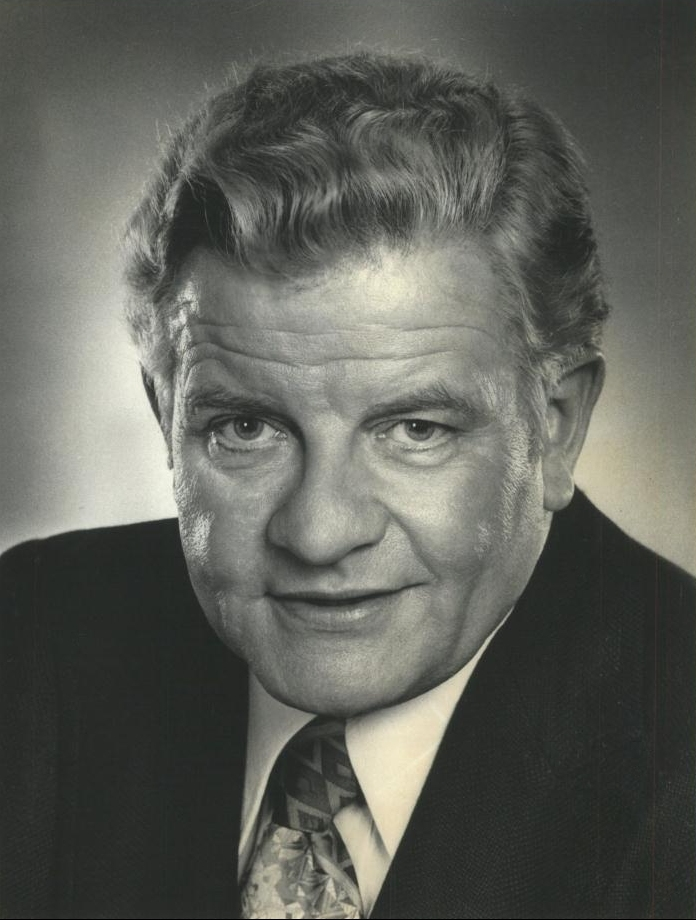
- McClory in 1975
- Born: 8 March 1924; Dublin, Ireland
- Died: 10 December 2003 (aged 79); Hollywood Hills, Los Angeles, California, US
- Other names: Shawn McGlory; Sean McGlory
- Occupation: Actor
- Years active: 1947–1993
- Spouses: Sue Alexander (died 1979) Peggy Webber (m. 1983)

Séan Joseph McClory (8 March 1924 – 10 December 2003) was an Irish actor whose career spanned six decades and included well over 100 films and television series. He was sometimes billed as Shawn McGlory or Sean McGlory.

== Early years ==
McClory was born Séan Joseph McClory on 8 March 1924 in Dublin, Ireland, but spent his early life in County Galway. He was the son of Hugh Patrick McClory, an architect and civil engineer, and Mary Margaret (née Ball), a model.

McClory studied at St. Ignatius Jesuit College and at the National University of Ireland Medical School. He served in the Irish Army Medical Corps during World War II.

After the War McClory was drawn to acting. When out of work, he turned to other employment, including washing dishes, driving trucks, working at a gold mine on the California-Nevada border and sailing around the world. At one point, he sold his blood to obtain money for food and drinks.

== Career ==
=== Stage ===
McClory began his career on stage, specializing in comedy at the Abbey Theatre. On Broadway, McClory portrayed Rory Commons in The King of Friday's Men (1951). His acting in regional theater included Dial "M" for Murder (1955) at the Sombrero Playhouse in Arizona and Shadow of a Gunman (1984) with the California Artists Repertory Theatre. He also acted in a summer theater in La Jolla, California.

=== Film ===
Jack Votion, a representative of RKO Pictures who was based in Europe, discovered McClory performing at the Abbey Theatre, after which McClory went to Hollywood in 1947 and began acting in films. His work included the role of an Irish policeman in Dick Tracy Meets Gruesome and Dick Tracy's Dilemma. He was part of the John Ford Stock Company, appearing in the Ford productions What Price Glory, The Long Gray Line, The Quiet Man, and Cheyenne Autumn. McClory portrayed a ringmaster in Ring of Fear (1954) and a chauffeur in the comedy My Chauffeur (1986).

=== Television ===
On television, McClory portrayed Captain Clary on the NBC adventure series Tales of the 77th Bengal Lancers, Pat McShane on the CBS crime drama Kate McShane, Myles on the CBS adventure series Bring 'Em Back Alive, and Jack McGivern on NBC's Western television series, The Californians.

In 1958, McClory was cast as Ted O'Malley in the episode "Short Haul" of the CBS crime drama, Richard Diamond, Private Detective, starring David Janssen.

McClory appeared twice in the 1960 NBC Western series, Overland Trail, starring William Bendix and Doug McClure. He was a guest star in the syndicated Western series, Pony Express and in 1960 on ABC's Western drama, The Man from Blackhawk, starring Robert Rockwell as a roving insurance investigator. Another 1960 role was as Quinn in "Talent for Danger" on the ABC adventure series, The Islanders, set in the South Pacific. In 1960 and 1961, McClory appeared in the episodes, "Heads, You Lose" and "Appointment at Tara-Bi", of another ABC series, Adventures in Paradise, starring Gardner McKay. McClory was a guest star in episodes of the television Western The Rifleman, "Knight Errant" (1961) and "I Take This Woman" (S5 E6 1962), playing Dennis O'Flarrety, an Irish romantic rival opposite Chuck Connors' lead character of Lucas McCain., for the affection of Lou Mallory, played by Patricia Blair.

McClory appeared as Jaimie MacDonald in the 1963 episode "Commando" of the CBS anthology series, GE True, hosted by Jack Webb. He was cast thereafter in a second-season episode of Irwin Allen's CBS science fiction series Lost in Space called "The Astral Traveller", as a Scottish bagpiping "ghost" named Hamish. He made several guest appearances on Perry Mason, including the 1961 episode, "The Case of the Malicious Mariner", the defendant in the 1962 episode, "The Case of the Unsuitable Uncle," and the title character and husband of the defendant in "The Case of the Scandalous Sculptor". McClory made two appearances on NBC's Bonanza, as Mark Connors in the 1962 episode "The Tall Stranger" and as Professor James Aloysuis McCarthy in the 1963 comedic episode "Hoss and the Leprechauns".

Sean played Scott Winters in CBS's Mannix episode "Then the Drink Takes the Man", which first aired on 30 December 1967.

In 1969 Sean appeared as NYC policeman Tim O’Sullivan in The Beverly Hillbillies episode “Manhattan Hillbillies”.

== Personal life and death ==
McClory was married four times. His third marriage, to Sue Alexander, ended with her death in 1979. He married actress Peggy Webber in 1983. On 10 December 2003, McClory died of a heart condition at his home in Hollywood Hills, California.

== Filmography ==
- 1947 Dick Tracy Meets Gruesome as Officer Carney (uncredited)
- 1947 Dick Tracy's Dilemma as Officer Dillon (uncredited)
- 1948 Beyond Glory as Barney
- 1949 Roughshod as Fowler
- 1950 The Daughter of Rosie O'Grady as James Moore
- 1950 The Glass Menagerie as Richard (uncredited)
- 1951 Storm Warning as Shore
- 1951 Lorna Doone as Charleworth Doone
- 1951 David and Bathsheba as Aide to King David (First Scene) (uncredited)
- 1951 The Desert Fox: The Story of Rommel as Jock (uncredited)
- 1951 Anne of the Indies as Hackett
- 1952 The Quiet Man as Owen Glynn
- 1952 What Price Glory as Lieutenant Austin (uncredited)
- 1952 Les Misérables as Bamtasbois (uncredited)
- 1952 Face to Face as Second Mate Robinson ('The Secret Sharer')
- 1952 Botany Bay as Marine Sergeant (uncredited)
- 1953 Niagara as Sam (uncredited)
- 1953 Rogue's March as McGinty
- 1953 Plunder of the Sun as Jefferson
- 1953 Island in the Sky as Frank Lovatt
- 1953 Man in the Attic as Constable #1
- 1953 Charade as Jack Stuydevant
- 1954 Them! as Major Kibbee
- 1954 Ring of Fear as Dublin O'Malley
- 1955 The Long Gray Line as "Dinny" Maher
- 1955 I Cover the Underworld as Gunner O'Hara and John O'Hara
- 1955 Moonfleet as Elzevir Block
- 1955 The King's Thief as Sheldon
- 1956 Diane as Count Michel Montgomery
- 1957 The Guns of Fort Petticoat as Emmett Kettle
- 1961 Valley of the Dragons as Michael Denning
- 1964 Mary Poppins as Hound / Reporter #4 (voice, uncredited)
- 1964 Cheyenne Autumn as Dr. O'Carberry
- 1965 Mara of the Wilderness as Dr. Frank Wade (uncredited)
- 1966 Follow Me, Boys! as Edward White Sr.
- 1967 The Gnome-Mobile as Horatio Quaxton
- 1967 The King's Pirate as Sparkes
- 1967 The Happiest Millionaire as Police Sergeant
- 1968 Bandolero! as Robbie O'Hare
- 1971 The Day of the Wolves as The Sheriff
- 1979 Roller Boogie as "Jammer" Delany
- 1986 My Chauffeur as O'Brien
- 1987 The Dead as Mr. Grace

== Television ==
- Cavalcade of America (1953–54) (Episodes: "The Arrow and the Bow" & "Courage in Connecticut") – Andrew Johnson
- Broken Arrow (1956) (Episode: "Passage Deferred") – Shawn
- Frontier (1955) (Episode: "Tomas and the Widow") – Gavin
- Alfred Hitchcock Presents (1956) (Season 1 Episode 22: "Place of Shadows") - Brother Gerard
- The Restless Gun (1957) (Episode: "Silver Threads") – Mike O'Hara
- The Adventures of Jim Bowie (1957) (Episode: "The Irishman") – Walter Holleran
- The Adventures of Jim Bowie (1957) (Episode: "Convoy Gold") – Pat Donovan
- The Californians (1957–58) (37 episodes) – Jack McGivern
- Richard Diamond, Private Detective (1958) (Episode: "Short Haul") – Ted O'Malley
- Steve Canyon (1958 (Episode: "The Gift") – Bert Quillan
- Have Gun – Will Travel (1958) (Episode: "The Solid Gold Patrol") – Corporal Mike Callahan
- Colgate Theatre (1958) (Episode: "McCreedy's Woman") – Aristotle
- Alfred Hitchcock Presents (1959) (Season 5 Episode 3: "Appointment at Eleven") as Irish Bar Patron
- Alcoa Presents: One Step Beyond (1959) (Episode: "The Inheritance") - Michael Barry (broadcast October 27, US)
- Wagon Train (1960) (Episode: "The Charlene Brenton Story") – Casey
- Overland Trail (1960) (Episodes: "The O'Mara's Ladies" & "All the O'Mara's Horses") – The O'Mara
- Wanted: Dead or Alive (1960) (Episode: "Jason") – 'Doc' Phillips
- Stagecoach West (1961) (Episode: "Finn McColl") – Finn McColl
- Bronco (1961) (Episode: "The Harrigan") – Terrence Harrigan
- The Life and Legend of Wyatt Earp (1961) (Episode: "Wyatt Earp's Baby") – Edgar 'Muley' Boles
- Perry Mason (1961) (Episode: "The Case of the Malicious Mariner") – Fred Wenzel
- Walt Disney's Wonderful World of Color (1961) (Episode: The Swamp Fox: A Woman's Courage) – Captain Myles
- The Rifleman (1961) (Episode: "Knight Errant") – Colonel Charles Black
- The Detectives (1962) (Episode: "One Lousy Wednesday") – The Swami
- Bonanza (1962) (Episode: "The Tall Stranger") – Mark Connors
- The Untouchables (1962) (Episode: "The Eddie O'Gara Story") – Vince O'Gara
- Checkmate (1962) (Episode: "The Heart Is a Handout") – Stamper
- The Rifleman (1962) (Episode: "I Take This Woman") – Dennis O'Flarrety
- The Untouchables (1962) (Episode: "The Whitey Steele Story") – Police Captain John Stanwood
- Laramie (1962) (Episode: "The Turn of the Wheel") – Gordon
- Perry Mason (1962) (Episode: "The Case of the Unsuitable Uncle") – Harry Fothergill
- Tales of Wells Fargo (1962) (Episode: "Incident at Crossbow") – Con Toole
- Thriller (1962) (Episode: "The Hollow Watcher") – Sean O'Danagh
- The Great Adventure (1963) (Episode: "The Story of Nathan Hale") – Major Carlton
- Bonanza (1963) (Episode: "Hoss and the Leprechauns") – Professor James Aloysius McCarthy
- Rawhide (1964) (Episode: "Damon's Road: Parts 1 & 2") – Finn
- Perry Mason (1964) (Episode: "The Case of the Scandalous Sculptor") – Hannibal Harvey
- Walt Disney's Wonderful World of Color (1965) (Episode: "The Adventures of Gallegher: Parts 1–3") – Officer Madden
- Daniel Boone (1965) (Episode: "The Devil's Four") – O'Hara
- The Virginian (1965) (Episode: "Day of the Scorpion") – Cobb
- Death Valley Days (1965) (Episode: "Magic Locket") – Joaquin Miller
- My Favorite Martian (1965) (Episode: "How Are Things in Glocca, Martin?") – Seamus O'Hara
- Iron Horse (1966) (Episode: "Right of Way Through Paradise") – Beau Sidell
- Family Affair (1967) (Episode: "The Other Cheek") – Mr. Michaels
- Mannix (1967) (Episode: "Then the Drink Takes the Man") – Scott Winters
- Lost in Space (1967) (Episode: "The Astral Traveller") – Hamish
- Lancer (1968) (Episode: "The High Riders") – Coley McHugh
- Daniel Boone (1968) (Episode: "Be Thankful for the Fickleness of Women") – Ephron Marsh
- The High Chaparral (1969) (Episode: "The Glory Soldiers") – Sandy McIntire
- Daniel Boone (1969) (Episode: "Jonah") – Bartender
- The Beverly Hillbillies (1969) (Episode: "Manhattan Hillbillies") – Police Officer
- The Guns of Will Sonnett (1969) (Episodes: "A Town in Terror: Parts 1 & 2") – Pat Murphy
- Gunsmoke (1970) (Episode: "The Judas Gun") – Clete Bolden
- The Virginian (1970) (Episode: "Holocaust") – Walter May
- Death Valley Days (1970) (Episode: "Talk to Me, Charley") – Charley Gentry
- "The Men From Shiloh" rebranded name of The Virginian (1971) (Episode: "The Town Killer") – Harry Post
- Gunsmoke (1974) (Episode: "The Town Tamers") – Sham
- The Blue Knight (1976) (Episode: "The Rose and the Gun")
- Captains and the Kings (TV Mini-Series) (1976) – Boland
- Little House on the Prairie (1976) (Episode: "The Runaway Caboose") – Sandy Nelson
- Once an Eagle (TV Mini-Series – Part 7) (1977) – Militia Colonel
- Battlestar Galactica (1978) (Episode: "The Long Patrol – Assault 9")
- Columbo (1978) (Episode: "The Conspirators") – Captain
- How the West Was Won (TV Mini-Series) (1978) – Ben Dodge
- General Hospital (1980) (aired 16 May 1980) – Judge (uncredited)
- Trapper John, M.D. (1981) (Episode: "'Tis the Season") – Reverend Flanagan
- Bring 'Em Back Alive (1982) (6 episodes) – Myles Delaney
- Simon & Simon (1983) (Episode: "Bon Voyage, Alonso") – Captain Cottrell
- Fantasy Island (1983) (Episode: "Revenge of the Forgotten/Charo") – Butler
- Falcon Crest (1985) (Episode: "Blood Brothers") – Frank O'Neal
- Murder, She Wrote (1986) (Episode: "Dead Man's Gold") – Ross Barber
- Walt Disney's Wonderful World of Color (1987) (Episode: "Young Harry Houdini") – Sean O'Casey
