= Maxine Cooper =

American actress (1924–2009)

Maxine Cooper Gomberg
- Cooper in 1964
- Born: Gladys Maxine Cooper; May 12, 1924; Chicago, Illinois, U.S.
- Died: April 4, 2009 (aged 84); Los Angeles, California, U.S.
- Resting place: Eden Memorial Park
- Occupations: Actress; activist; photographer
- Years active: 1948–1980
- Spouse: Wolfe Frank 1947-1953 Sy Gomberg (1957–2001; his death)
- Children: 3

Gladys Maxine Cooper (May 12, 1924 – April 4, 2009) was an American actress, activist, and photographer. She was perhaps best known for her role as private detective Mike Hammer's secretary Velda in the 1955 film Kiss Me Deadly, which the Los Angeles Times called a "film noir classic."

== Early life ==
Gladys Maxine Cooper was born in Chicago, Illinois, in 1924 to Richard and Gladys Cooper. Her father was employed as a General Electric distributor. She first became interested in the theater and acting while she was enrolled as a student at Bennington College in Vermont. Cooper transferred to the Pasadena Playhouse in Pasadena, California, where she completed her education in drama.

== Early career ==
Cooper travelled to Europe in 1946 to perform for United States military troops stationed on the continent, following the end of World War II as part of the United Services Organization (USO). She travelled throughout post-war Europe, entertaining the troops with an ensemble of other actors, including Veda Ann Borg, Rose Hobart, and Ellen Corby.

She remained in Europe for more than five years, performing in both theatrical productions and television shows for the BBC. Her BBC television play credits included I Killed the Count in 1948, and You Can't Take It with You in 1947, which co-starred Finlay Currie. She often performed at the Café de Paris in London. Maxine Cooper, during this time, was married to Hugh Wolfe Frank from February 16, 1947, until their divorce on July 13, 1953. From book..."Nuremburg:Voice of Doom" by Wolfe Frank

Cooper returned to the United States during the 1950s, and appeared in a number of television roles, including the 1959 Twilight Zone episode "And When the Sky Was Opened", and Dragnet. She also made two guest appearances on Perry Mason: in 1958 she played Gladys Strome, the title character, in "The Case of the Fugitive Nurse", and, in 1959, she played Edith Devoe, also a nurse, in "The Case of the Caretaker's Cat."

== Kiss Me Deadly ==
Cooper made her film debut in the 1955 thriller Kiss Me Deadly, which was based on a novel by Mickey Spillane. Director Robert Aldrich cast Cooper in Kiss Me Deadly after seeing her turn as the character Anitra in a Los Angeles production of the play Peer Gynt. Aldrich later cast Cooper in two of his other films, Autumn Leaves (1956) and What Ever Happened to Baby Jane? (1962).

She portrayed the character Velda, a trustworthy secretary to Ralph Meeker's detective Mike Hammer, the film's main character. In the early 1970s, the original ending in which Velda and Mike view an explosion which destroyed the beach house had vanished. The real ending was rediscovered by a film editor in the 1990s, though no one is sure why the ending had been tampered.

== Later career ==
Cooper married Sy Gomberg, a screenwriter and producer, in 1957. She left the acting profession in the early 1960s in order to raise her family.

Gomberg and her husband became active members of the Hollywood activist community. She helped to organize groups of actors, writers and studio executives to participate in marches with Martin Luther King Jr. in Montgomery, Alabama, during the 1960s. Cooper also led campaigns against House Un-American Activities Committee's Hollywood blacklists. She also spearheaded protests by those in the entertainment industry against nuclear weapons, the Vietnam War, and other causes.

Gomberg briefly returned to her acting roots during the 1970s. She made a cameo appearance as herself in the 1975 television series Fear on Trial, which starred George C. Scott as John Henry Faulk, a blacklisted 1950s television and radio host.

Gomberg became a photographer during her later life. Her photographs were used to illustrate a book by Howard Fast entitled The Art of Zen Meditation. The Los Angeles Times referred to the book as "beautiful" in a 1977 book review when referring to her photographs.

== Death ==
Maxine and Sy Gomberg remained married until his death in 2001, aged 82. She died on April 4, 2009, from natural causes at her home in Los Angeles, aged 84.

== Filmography ==
Film
Year	Title	Role	Notes
1955	Kiss Me Deadly	Velda Wickman	Alternative title: Mickey Spillane's Kiss Me Deadly
1956	Autumn Leaves	Nurse Evans	
1957	Zero Hour!	Sick Woman on Plane	
1962	What Ever Happened to Baby Jane?	Bank teller	
Television
Year	Title	Role	Notes
1948	The Front Page	Peggy Grant	Television movie
1954	The New Adventures of China Smith		1 episode
1954–1956	Schlitz Playhouse of Stars	Various roles	5 episodes
1955	The Star and the Story	Mary Rainey	1 episode
1955	Alfred Hitchcock Presents	Mary	Season 1 Episode 6: "Salvage"
1955	Studio 57		1 episode
1955	The Millionaire	Virginia Hewett	1 episode
1955	You Are There		1 episode
1956	Chevron Hall of Stars	Rob	1 episode
1956	Matinee Theatre		1 episode
1956	Four Star Playhouse	Millie Barr; Carol	2 episodes
1956	Wire Service		1 episode
1956	Dragnet		3 episodes
1956	The Count of Monte Cristo	Susan	1 episode
1956	State Trooper	Mary Herndon	1 episode
1956	General Electric Theater	Helen	1 episode
1957	Soldiers of Fortune	Diane Graham	1 episode
1957	Mr. Adams and Eve		"Adult Western"
1957	Maverick	Donna Seely	1 episode
1958–1959	Perry Mason	Gladys Strome; Edith Devoe	"The Case of the Fugitive Nurse" "The Case of the Caretaker's Cat"
1959	Peter Gunn	Maria Matzi	1 episode
1959	The D.A.'s Man	Ina	1 episode
1959	Richard Diamond, Private Detective	Edith Beldon	1 episode
1959	The Twilight Zone	Amy	"And When the Sky Was Opened"
1960	Philip Marlowe	Janet	1 episode
1960	Wanted: Dead or Alive	Constance Howard	Episode "The Inheritance"
1975	Fear on Trial	Herself	Television movie
1980	High Ice	Peggy	Television movie, (final appearance)
