= The Killing Man =

1989 novel by Mickey Spillane

- First edition cover
- Author: Mickey Spillane
- Publisher: E.P. Dutton
- Publication date: November 1989
- ISBN: 0-525-24827-7

The Killing Man (1989) is American crime writer Mickey Spillane's twelfth novel featuring private investigator Mike Hammer.

== Plot summary ==
The Killing Man is a typical Mike Hammer murder mystery, only in this story, the tables are turned and bad things are happening to Mike Hammer himself. Mike walks into his office to discover his beloved secretary, Velda, unconscious, the brutal murder of ex-mobster Anthony DiCica at Mike's desk, and a note from the killer signed Penta. Mike is in the middle and taking hits from the DA's office, the FBI, the CIA, and the mob, while being assumed to have been the intended victim when DiCica was murdered. Hammer then leaps into action, finding the perpetrator. This crime is bigger, however, involving not only himself, but an ambitious, lovely District attorney and several federal agencies.
