= Richard T. Heffron =

American film and television director

- Born: October 6, 1930; Chicago, Illinois, United States
- Died: August 27, 2007 (aged 76); Seattle, Washington, United States
- Occupation: Film director
- Years active: 1971–1996

Richard T. Heffron (October 6, 1930 – August 27, 2007) was an American film director.

He worked on many television series such as The Rockford Files and films including I Will Fight No More Forever (1975), Futureworld (1976), Foolin' Around (1980), the 1982 Mike Hammer film I, the Jury, Pancho Barnes (1988), and La révolution française (1989). He also directed the six-episode miniseries North and South but did not return to direct its follow-up series in 1986 and 1994.

Heffron also produced and directed Night of the Dragon (1965), a propaganda film produced by the US Information Agency and narrated by Charlton Heston about South Vietnam. Another film he wrote and directed for USIA was Africa Will Be (1970), about the challenges of economic development in post-independent Africa.
