= The Goliath Bone =

2008 novel by Mickey Spillane

- First edition cover
- Author: Mickey Spillane with Max Allan Collins
- Publisher: Houghton Mifflin Harcourt
- Publication date: October 13, 2008
- ISBN: 978-0-15-101454-5

The Goliath Bone is the 14th entry in the Mike Hammer series by American crime novelist Mickey Spillane, first published on October 13, 2008. Spillane died in 2006, so the novel completed by Max Allan Collins. The Goliath Bone is one of three almost-finished Mike Hammer novels that Spillane entrusted Collins to finish before his death in 2006.

== Plot ==
Hammer is forced to put off retirement and his marriage to his longtime love and secretary, Velda, after he falls into the middle of an international crisis. Hammer saves a couple of archaeologists from unknown muggers in New York, who turn out to be Al Qaeda agents who believe they possess a thigh bone of the Biblical character Goliath. Hammer now finds himself going against Islamic terrorists, including a 7-foot agent code named "Goliath".

In the novel, Mike Hammer marries Velda Sterling at City Hall.
