= Mike Hammer (character) =

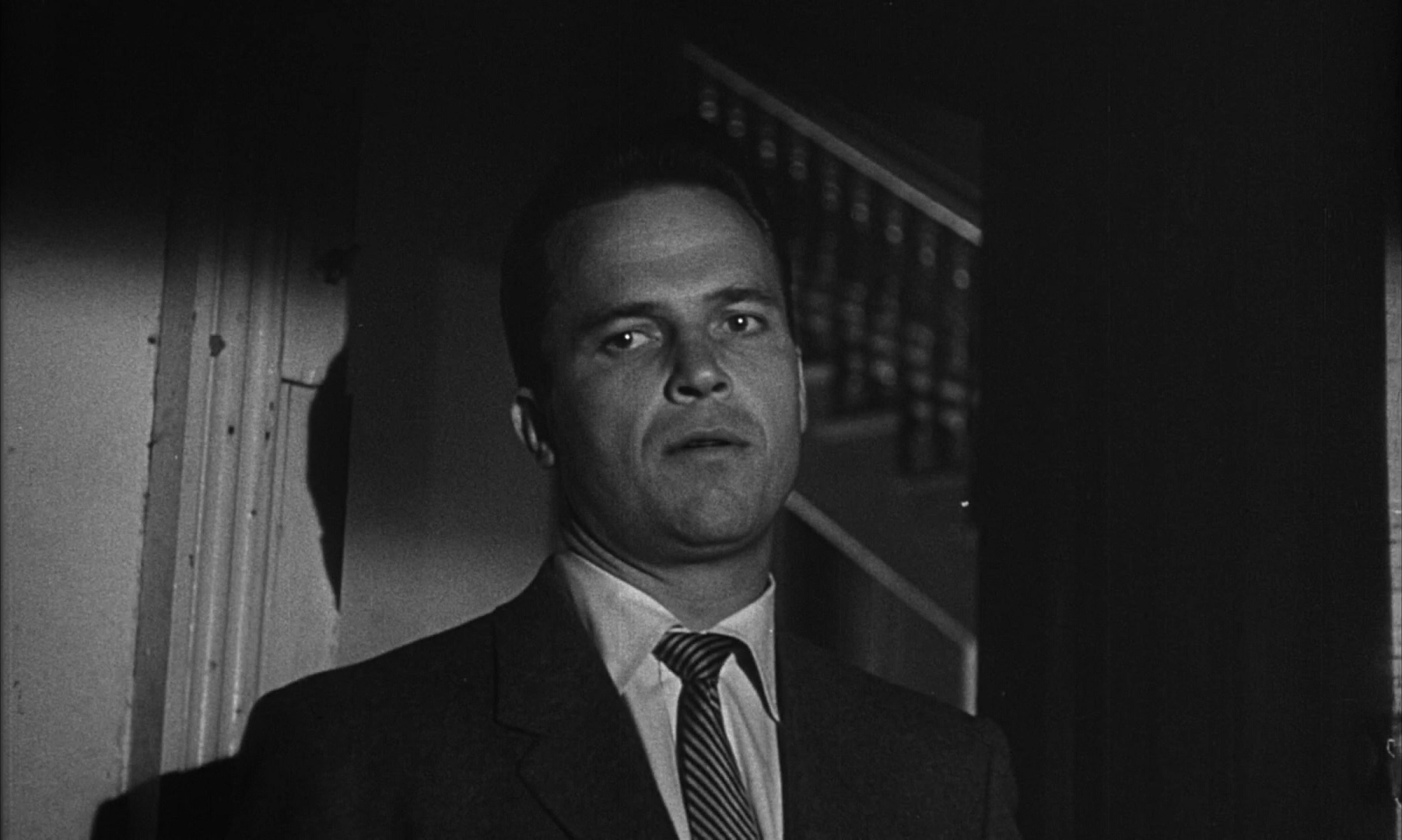
- Ralph Meeker as Mike Hammer in the 1955 film Kiss Me Deadly.
- First appearance: I, the Jury (1947) (first novel by Mickey Spillane)
- Created by: Mickey Spillane (series continued by Max Allan Collins after Spillane's death)
- Portrayed by: Biff Elliot (film); Ralph Meeker (film); Larry Haines (radio); George Petrie (radio); Ted de Corsia (radio); Brian Keith (TV pilot); Robert Bray (film); Darren McGavin (TV series); Mickey Spillane (film); Kevin Dobson (TV movie); Armand Assante (film); Stacy Keach (TV movies, TV series, audio drama); Rob Estes (TV movie)

In-universe information
- Gender: Male
- Occupation: Private detective
- Nationality: American

Michael Hammer is a fictional character created by the American author Mickey Spillane. Hammer debuted in the 1947 book I, the Jury, and appeared in 13 novels by Spillane (the final published 1996), and 15 more published by Max Allan Collins after Spillane's death and based on Spillane's notes or incomplete manuscripts.

Spillane's Mike Hammer books were immensely successful in the 1950s, and Spillane's books rank among the best-selling fiction in modern publishing history with estimated sales over 100 million to 200 million. The Hammer character was also adapted to film and television on multiple occasions between the 1950s and early 2000s.

Hammer is a no-holds-barred private investigator whose love for his secretary Velda is outweighed only by his willingness to kill a killer. Hammer's best friend is Pat Chambers, Captain of NYPD Homicide. Hammer was a World War II army veteran who spent two years fighting jungle warfare in the Pacific Ocean theater of World War II against Japan.

== Creation ==
In 1942, when he was a comic book writer, Spillane created the private detective Mike Lancer published in Green Hornet Comics #10 (December, 1942) by Harvey Comics. The character was partly based on Spillane's friend Jack Stang, an ex-U.S. Marine turned police officer in Newburgh, New York.

In 1946, Spillane worked with illustrator Mike Roy and Edwin Robbins to create the private-eye character Mike Danger for proposed comic-book or comic-strip publication. Unable to sell the project as a comic, he reworked the story as the novel I, the Jury, converting Mike Danger to Mike Hammer and supporting character Holly to Velda. "Mike Hammer originally started out to be a comic book. I was gonna have a Mike Danger comic book," Spillane said in a 1984 interview. Two Mike Danger comic-book stories were published in 1954 without Spillane's knowledge, as well as one featuring Mike Lancer (1942). These were published with other material in "Byline: Mickey Spillane," edited by Max Allan Collins and Lynn F. Myers, Jr. (Crippen & Landru publishers, 2004).

== Character ==
While pulp detectives such as Sam Spade and Philip Marlowe are hard-boiled and cynical, Hammer is in many ways the archetypal "hard man": brutally violent, and fueled by a genuine rage against violent crime that never afflicts Raymond Chandler's or Dashiell Hammett's heroes. In The Big Kill, Hammer describes himself to a bargirl as a misanthrope. Spillane admitted to pulp writer Carroll John Daly, generally regarded as the inventor of the hard-boiled private eye figure, that Hammer was also loosely modeled on Race Williams, Daly's most frequently used detective character.

While other hardboiled heroes bend and manipulate the law, Hammer often views it as an impediment to justice, the one virtue he holds in absolute esteem. Hammer nevertheless has a strong respect for the majority of police, realizing they have a difficult job and their hands are frequently tied by the law when trying to stop criminals.

Hammer is also patriotic and anti-communist. The novels are peppered with remarks by Hammer supporting American troops in Korea, and in Survival...Zero Vietnam. In One Lonely Night, where Hammer attends a communist meeting in a park, his reaction to the speaker's propaganda is a sarcastic "Yeah."

So far as violence is concerned, the Hammer novels leave little to the imagination. Written in the first person, Hammer describes his violent encounters with relish. In all but a few novels, Hammer's victims are often left vomiting after a blow to the stomach or groin.

Hammer is an ageless character, always depicted about 30 years old. Spillane said of his character: "See, heroes never die. John Wayne isn't dead, Elvis isn't dead. Otherwise you don't have a hero. You can't kill a hero. That's why I never let him get older."

The Washington Times obituary of Spillane said of Hammer, "In a manner similar to Clint Eastwood's Dirty Harry, Hammer was a cynical loner contemptuous of the 'tedious process' of the legal system, choosing instead to enforce the law on his own terms."

== Novels ==
=== By Mickey Spillane ===
- I, the Jury (1947)
- My Gun is Quick (1950)
- Vengeance Is Mine (1950)
- One Lonely Night (1951)
- The Big Kill (1951)
- Kiss Me, Deadly (1952)
- The Girl Hunters (1962)
- The Snake (1964)
- The Twisted Thing (1966) [written in 1949]
- The Body Lovers (1967)
- Survival... Zero! (1970)
- The Killing Man (1989)
- Black Alley (1996)

=== By Mickey Spillane with Max Allan Collins ===
- The Goliath Bone (2008)
- The Big Bang (2010)
- Kiss Her Goodbye (2011)
- Lady, Go Die! (2012)
- Complex 90 (2013)
- King of the Weeds (2014)
- Kill Me, Darling (2015)
- Murder Never Knocks (2016)
- The Will To Kill (2017)
- Killing Town (2018)
- Murder, My Love (2019)
- Masquerade for Murder (2020)
- Kill Me If You Can (2022)
- Dig Two Graves (2023)
- Baby, It's Murder (2025) - The Final Mike Hammer Novel

== Novels in chronological order ==
- Killing Town (2018)
- I, the Jury (1947)
- Lady, Go Die! (2012)
- The Twisted Thing (1966) [written in 1949]
- My Gun is Quick (1950)
- Vengeance Is Mine (1950)
- One Lonely Night (1951)
- The Big Kill (1951)
- Kiss Me, Deadly (1952)
- Kill Me, Darling (2015)
- Kill Me If You Can (2022)
- The Girl Hunters (1962)
- The Snake (1964)
- Dig Two Graves (2023)
- The Big Bang (2010)
- Complex 90 (2013)
- Murder Never Knocks (2016)
- The Body Lovers (1967)
- Survival... Zero! (1970)
- The Big Bang (2010)
- The Killing Man (1989)
- Masquerade for Murder (2020)
- Murder, My Love (2019)
- Black Alley (1996)
- King of the Weeds (2014)
- The Goliath Bone (2008)
- Baby, It's Murder (2025)

== Short stories ==
=== By Mickey Spillane ===
- The Night I Died (published in the anthology Private Eyes first published in 1998, although short story was written in 1953)
- The Duke Alexander (published in the book Byline: Mickey Spillane first published in 2004, although it was originally written circa 1956)
- The Killing Man (short story later turned into a full-length Mike Hammer novel published in Playboy magazine December 1989, later republished in the book Byline: Mickey Spillane in 2004)
- Black Alley (short story later turned into a full-length Mike Hammer novel published in Playboy magazine December 1996, later republished in the book Byline: Mickey Spillane in 2004)

=== By Mickey Spillane with Max Allan Collins ===
- The Big Switch (published in The Strand Magazine, 2008, reprinted in paperback in The Mammoth Book of the World's Best Crime Stories, 2009)
- A Long Time Dead (published in The Strand Magazine 2010)
- Grave Matter (published in Crimes By Moonlight, ed. Charlaine Harris, 2010)
- Skin (e-book short story 2012)
- So Long, Chief (published in The Strand Magazine, Issue XXXIX, Feb. - May 2013)
- It's In The Book (e-book short story 2014)
- Fallout (published in The Strand Magazine 2015)
- A Dangerous Cat (published in The Strand Magazine, Issue XLVIII, Feb. - May 2016)
- A Long Time Dead: A Mike Hammer Casebook (A collection of short stories by Mickey Spillane and Max Allan Collins 2016 - published by Mysteriouspress.com/Open Road. This collection reprints the stories The Big Switch, A Long Time Dead, Grave Matter, So Long, Chief, Fallout, A Dangerous Cat, Skin (first time in print format), and It's In The Book (first time in print format))
- Tonight My Love (published in The Strand Magazine, Issue LVI, Oct. 2018 - Jan. 2019 - Max Allan Collins developed this short story from a Mickey Spillane radio-style playlet that was part of a Mike Hammer jazz LP - Mickey Spillane's Mike Hammer Story - produced in 1954 by Mickey Spillane. This is the story of how Mike Hammer met Velda.)
- Kill Me If You Can: Mike Hammer 75 1947-2022 (This first edition of the 2022 novel Kill Me If You Can - published by Titan Books - is accompanied by five Hammerverse short stories by Mickey Spillane and Max Allan Collins: The Big Run, A Killer Is Loose!, Killer's Alley (featuring Mike Hammer), The Punk, and Tonight My Love (featuring Mike Hammer).

== In other media ==
Several films and radio and television series have been based on the books in the Hammer series. The actor most closely identified with the character has been Stacy Keach, who portrayed Hammer in a CBS television series, Mickey Spillane's Mike Hammer, which ran from 1984–1987 and had a syndicated revival in 1997–1998. (An earlier syndicated version, originally aired in 1957–1958, starred Darren McGavin as Hammer.) Spillane himself played Hammer in a 1963 motion picture adaptation of The Girl Hunters.

Spillane himself favored Jack Stang to perform as Hammer. Hammer arranged a screen test for Stang, who appeared in small supporting roles with Spillane in the 1954 film Ring of Fear and in the film adaptation of I, the Jury.

=== Films ===
==== Feature films ====
DVD cover of The Girl Hunters

- I, the Jury (United Artists, 1953), filmed in 3-D starring Biff Elliot as Mike Hammer.
- Kiss Me Deadly (United Artists, 1955), Robert Aldrich was the director, Ralph Meeker was cast as Hammer, while Maxine Cooper portrayed Hammer's sexy secretary/companion Velda.
- My Gun Is Quick (United Artists, 1957), Robert Bray was cast as Hammer, with more of the violence originating from the villain than the detective. The film grossed $308,000 with a total of $602 overseas.
- The Girl Hunters (Colorama Features, 1963), Mickey Spillane was given the rare opportunity to portray his own creation in this film. This is one of the few occasions in film history in which the creator of a literary character was later hired to portray that character in a film. Producer Robert Fellows and Spillane planned to follow the film with The Snake but it never materialised.
- I, the Jury (20th Century Fox, 1982), Armand Assante plays a brutal, energetic Hammer opposite Laurene Landon's sexy, athletic Velda in this hard R-rated 80s adaptation written by Larry Cohen and directed by Richard T. Heffron. Considered by the majority of Spillane fans (including Spillane co-author Max Allan Collins) to be the most authentic adaptation of the "psychotic" early Hammer novels.

==== Television films ====
- Margin for Murder (1981 TV movie), Kevin Dobson plays Hammer in this made-for-TV movie.
- Murder Me, Murder You (1983 TV movie), Stacy Keach played Hammer in this TV pilot for the TV series that ran in the 1980s. This update featured a traitor to the United States, and a daughter Hammer does not know he has.
- More Than Murder (1984 TV movie), Stacy Keach again played Hammer as a high-stakes poker game is robbed and police Captain Pat Chambers intervenes as the thieves make their getaway. He is shot in the back and then framed as a drug dealer. Hammer makes it his job to clear Pat and find out who nearly killed him.
- The Return of Mickey Spillane's Mike Hammer (1986 TV movie), Stacy Keach reprises his role as Hammer in this pilot for the third season of his Hammer TV show aka The New Mike Hammer. In this April 1986 TV movie, a young girl is kidnapped and there is an attempt on the daughter of a well-known actress, after which the kidnapper then turns up dead. Hammer is hired to protect the girl and travels to Los Angeles.
- Mike Hammer: Murder Takes All (1989 TV movie), Keach reprises his role of Hammer co-starring Lynda Carter, Michelle Phillips and the pre-stardom Jim Carrey . He is asked by a Las Vegas entertainer named Johnny Roman (Edward Winter) to come to Vegas. Mike refuses, he is then knocked out and dropped literally into Las Vegas.
- Come Die with Me: A Mickey Spillane's Mike Hammer Mystery (1994 TV movie), Rob Estes plays Hammer in this TV movie, opposite Pamela Anderson as his secretary, Velda.
- Mike Hammer: Song Bird (2003) (V) – a direct-to-video compilation of Mike Hammer, Private Eye's 1998 episodes of "Songbird: Part 1" and "Songbird: Part 2", where Stacy Keach played Mike Hammer and Shannon Whirry played his secretary Velda.

=== Television ===
There have been a few television shows based on the exploits of Mike Hammer.

- A 1954 television pilot was developed starring Brian Keith that was written and directed by Blake Edwards, it was not picked up.
- Mickey Spillane's Mike Hammer (1958–1960; starring Darren McGavin)
- Mickey Spillane's Mike Hammer (January 1984–January 1985; starring Stacy Keach)
- The New Mike Hammer (September 1986–May 1987; starring Stacy Keach)
- Mike Hammer, Private Eye (September 1997–June 1998; starring Stacy Keach)

=== Comics ===
Mickey Spillane, Ed Robbins and Joe Gill's From the Files of... Mike Hammer (January 31, 1954).

A short-lived comic strip starring Mike Hammer was distributed by Phoenix Features Syndicate from 1953 to 1954. It was entitled From the Files of... Mike Hammer and written by Spillane, Ed Robbins and Joe Gill, with art by Ed Robbins. Collections of the strip were published in the 1980s.

In 1956, the Turkish comics artist Oğuz Aral created a parody of Mike Hammer titled Hayk Mammer.

Walt Kelly wrote two parodies of Mike Hammer first published in collections of original work of his Pogo comic strip. They were: "The Bloody Drip - by Mucky Spleen" (Uncle Pogo So-so Stories, 1953) and "Gore Blimey - The Bloody Drip Writhes Again " (Pogo Peek-A-Book, 1955).

In 2013 Hermes Press reprinted the complete "Mike Hammer" comic strip, with a special introduction by Max Collins.

In 2018, Titan Comics published four parts "Mickey Spillane's Mike Hammer" comic series, written by Max Allan Collins with artwork by Marcelo Salaza and Marcio Freire. Later that same year, these four issues were collected as the graphic novel Mickey Spillane's Mike Hammer: The Night I Died.

=== Audio ===
- Radio Series - A December 1952 to October 1954 Mutual Broadcasting System radio series titled That Hammer Guy starred Larry Haines then George Petrie and Ted DeCorsia as Mike Hammer and Jan Miner as Hammer's secretary Velda and the voice of other female characters on the show. It was written by Ed Adamson and was directed by Richard Lewis.
- Audiobooks - An array of Spillane's novels has been produced as audiobooks. Several of these are performed by Mickey Spillane's Mike Hammer veteran Stacy Keach. Examples include Black Alley (Penguin Audio, 1996), The Big Kill (Simon & Schuster, 2010) and The Killing Man (Simon & Schuster, 2010). Also, in 2015, Simon & Schuster released the unabridged version of I, The Jury, narrated by Mike Dennis.
- Blackstone Audio Productions - In 2008, Stacy Keach reprised the role of Mike Hammer in the first of a series of radio-style dramas entitled The New Adventures of Mickey Spillane's Mike Hammer. Keach refers to the production style, that is somewhere between an audiobook and radio drama, as a "radio novel." Article title Audie-nominated inaugural production features the episodes, Dangerous Days and Oil and Water. Both were written exclusively for audio by M.J. Elliott and produced with a full cast, music and sound effects in radio drama style by Carl Amari of Falcon Picture Group, who personally selected Elliott to script the Audie Award-nominated dramas. Volume 2 of the series was released in 2009, featuring a 2.5-hour story entitled The Little Death. The story was written exclusively for audio by Max Allan Collins from a story by Mickey Spillane and Max Allan Collins. Volume 3, Encore for Murder, was released in March 2011. All three volumes have been released by Blackstone Audio and star Keach in the title role. Keach also arranges and performs the music featured in the productions and his wife, Malgosia Tomassi, portrays yoga instructor Maya Ricci.

== In popular culture ==
- Novels featuring Hammer were referenced several times in Star Trek: Deep Space Nine. Both Odo and Miles O'Brien were fans.
- The film The Hebrew Hammer makes a reference to Mike Hammer as well.
- Four direct to video films known as the "Maiku Hama" films were released in Japan:
  - Waga jinsei saiaku no toki (The most terrible time in my life), 1994
  - Harukana jidai no kaidan o (The stairway to the distant past), 1995
  - Wana (The trap), 1996
  - Shiritsu tantei Hama Maiku: Namae no nai mori - 2002
- The Japanese TV series Detective Mike stars a young detective called 'Hama Mike' (Japanese pronunciation of 'Mike Hammer').
- The 1986 video game Killed Until Dead by Artech Digital Entertainment features spoofs of famous characters including a "Mike Stammer".
- John Zorn's Spillane is a tribute to Mickey Spillane, which uses quotes of Mike Hammer voiced by John Lurie.
- The popular Canadian band Moist wrote a song titled "Mike Hammer" on their fourth studio album Mercedes 5 and Dime.
- A police detective sarcastically identifies himself as 'Mike Hammer' in El secreto de sus ojos, the Academy Award-winning 2009 Argentine film.
- The Swedish musician Magnus Uggla wrote a song called IQ, in which a stereotypical violent and simple-minded nightclub bouncer is sarcastically described as being "dangerous like Mike Hammer".
