= I, the Jury (1953 film) =

1953 film by Harry Essex

- Theatrical release poster
- Directed by: Harry Essex
- Screenplay by: Harry Essex
- Based on: the novel I, the Jury by Mickey Spillane
- Produced by: Victor Saville
- Starring: Biff Elliot; Preston Foster; Peggie Castle; Margaret Sheridan; Alan Reed
- Cinematography: John Alton
- Music by: Franz Waxman
- Production company: Parklane Pictures
- Distributed by: United Artists
- Release dates: July 24, 1953 (Premiere (Chicago)); August 14, 1953 (United States)
- Running time: 87 minutes
- Country: United States
- Language: English
- Box office: $1.4 million (US)

I, the Jury is a 1953 American film noir crime film directed by Harry Essex and starring Biff Elliot, Preston Foster, Peggie Castle and Margaret Sheridan. It was written by Essex based on the 1947 novel I, the Jury by Mickey Spillane. It was produced by Victor Saville's company, Parklane Pictures and released through United Artists.

The film is notable for being the first based on a Mike Hammer novel. It was filmed in 3-D and was available with stereophonic sound.

The story begins with Mike Hammer on the vengeance trail when Jack, a friend, is murdered. Hammer sets out to find the killer, working his way through an increasingly large pile of suspects (and corpses).

== Plot ==
Shortly before Christmas in New York City, one-armed insurance investigator Jack Williams is looking at a college yearbook photo of John Hansen when someone slips into his apartment and shoots him to death. Hot-headed private investigator Mike Hammer, Jack's war buddy, vows to avenge his friend's death despite a warning from Pat Chambers, captain of the homicide squad, to let the police handle the case. Pat is unable to calm Mike, who roughs up a wisecracking reporter before leaving the crime scene. Knowing that Mike will forge ahead with an investigation regardless of his advice, Pat urges the offended reporter to publish an article disclosing that Mike is on the job.

Mike goes to see Jack's fiancée, Myrna Devlin, a torch singer and reformed drug addict, but she is too distraught to talk with him. The next day, Mike's secretary Velda tells him about the article, titled "I, the Jury", which suggests that Mike knows the identity of the killer, thereby making him a target. Because Pat has given him a guest list from Jack's recent party, Mike surmises that the police captain is using him to draw out the killer.

Mike begins his investigation, first visiting wealthy fight promoter and art collector George Kalecki in upstate New York. Kalecki introduces his live-in friend, John Hansen, as college student Hal Kines, and claims they were home together after the party. As Mike is leaving, he looks through a window and sees the men arguing. Mike next visits alluring psychoanalyst and author Charlotte Manning, who was treating both Jack and Myrna. Charlotte flirts with Mike but provides no new information.

Afterward, Mike finds Pat waiting for him. He is told that Kines moved out of Kalecki's house and that Kines believes Mike attempted to shoot him. Kines's new address is the same building where two other party guests, twin sisters Esther and Mary Bellamy, reside. Mike searches Kines's apartment and finds photos of him and Kalecki in Europe before and after World War II.

When Kines returns unexpectedly and grabs Mike's arm, the detective beats him up. He goes upstairs to see Mary, who knew Jack when he worked as a guard at her father's estate. As Mike resists Mary's attempts to seduce him, he questions her about the party and learns that Charlotte drove her, Myrna and Esther home that night after Jack and Myrna had an argument.

Later at his office, ex-boxer Killer Thompson reveals to Mike and Velda that Kalecki, his former manager, runs a numbers racket. Mike seeks more information about the racket but his questions earn him only a severe beating by some thugs. Charlotte tends to his wounds and restores his spirits with a kiss, then asks if Jack might have left a message for Mike before he died.

Mike slips into Jack's apartment through a window to avoid the policeman on guard, and finds a note from Pat, who anticipated his arrival. Mike also finds Jack's diary, which includes notations about a woman named Eileen Vickers, who changed her name to Mary Wright, as well as a note that Jack had been planning to raid a dance school with the police in a few days. Mike locates Eileen's father, veterinarian R.H. Vickers, who reveals that he had asked Jack to help his daughter after she ran away from college with John Hansen. Mike finds Eileen at a dance school that is a front for prostitution. Although she is shocked to hear about Jack's death, she only knows that he wanted her to get help from Charlotte.

Despite all the information he has gathered, Mike has more questions than answers. He and Pat continue their research by looking through college yearbooks and find the photo of Hal Kines, who is identified as John Hansen. After police implement Jack's raid on the dance studio, they find Eileen's and Kines's dead bodies in Eileen's room. After Kalecki admits that he and Kines had argued over the young man's involvement with Esther, Mike is baffled as to why he was found with Eileen. Confusion continues to mount, and Charlotte and Mike are nearly killed when someone fires at them outside his office. Mike is awakened that night by Bobo, a slow-witted former boxer now working as a department store Santa Claus, who warns Mike that "the big man" is after him. After learning that Kines has been posing as a college student for twenty years, Velda suspects that he may have been running Kalecki's numbers racket at school, using his identity as a student as a cover. Mike goes to search Kines's room at the fraternity house and discovers Kalecki inside burning Kines's papers. Kalecki shoots at Mike and is killed when Mike fires back. Mike grabs Kalecki's gun just as the police arrive to arrest him.

Angered that Mike is taking the law into his own hands, Pat waits until the next day to release him from jail. Mike then gives him Kalecki's gun and they later search Kalecki's safe-deposit box, which is filled with stolen vintage European jewelry. The detectives now realize that Jack must have been investigating Kalecki and Kines, who had been fencing stolen jewelry from Europe for years. A police analyst determines that although all four murders were committed by the same weapon, it was not Kalecki's gun. Knowing that Myrna was once a jewel thief, Pat now suspects that she may have been influenced by Kalecki to murder her fiancé.

As before, Mike confides in Charlotte, with whom he has fallen in love, and tells her he believes that Kines worked the college campuses to recruit new thieves for Kalecki. When Pat learns that Myrna is drunk in a bar, he sends Mike and Charlotte to retrieve her, and they take her to Charlotte's apartment to sober up. After Mike leaves, however, Charlotte injects Myrna with sodium pentothal and questions her about Jack, but Myrna is too disoriented to respond. Meanwhile, Mike is beaten up by Kalecki's thugs at his office, but he turns the tables on them and they are eventually arrested; however, they reveal no new information when questioned. When Myrna is found dead in the street from a hit and run accident, the medical examiner finds the needle mark on her arm, prompting Pat to assume that she had returned to drug use. Mike then realizes that Charlotte murdered Myrna, and surmises that Charlotte found out about the jewelry racket during a hypnosis session with Kines and that she plans to take over Kalecki's business. Mike waits for Charlotte in her apartment and levels his accusations at her. Charlotte pretends to try to seduce him, but is, unknown to Mike, reaching for a hidden gun as she embraces him. Mike then kills her.

== Cast ==
- Biff Elliot as Mike Hammer
- Preston Foster as Captain Pat Chambers
- Peggie Castle as Charlotte Manning
- Margaret Sheridan as Velda
- Alan Reed as George Kalecki
- Mary Anderson as Eileen Vickers
- John Qualen as Dr. R.H. Vickers
- Tom Powers as Milt Miller
- Robert Swanger as Jack Williams
- Frances Osborne as Myrna Devlin
- Bob Cunningham as Hal Kines
- Dran Hamilton as Mary Bellamy (as Dran Seitz)
- Tani Guthrie as Esther Bellamy (as Tani Seitz)
- Joe Besser as Pete the elevator operator
- Nestor Paiva as Manuel
- Elisha Cook Jr. as Bobo

== Reception ==
=== Critical response ===
The film received mostly negative reviews at the time of its release.

The Monthly Film Bulletin wrote: "I, The Jury, based on one of Mickey Spillane's most brutal thrillers, tells its story with the emphasis monotonously on violence and sex. It must be one of the most charmless films ever made, and it seems extraordinary that it should be produced by the man who once directed [sic] Goodbye, Mr. Chips. The direction and the playing (notably that of Biff Elliot as the tough Mr. Hammer) are so clumsily ineffectual that even the most violent scenes achieve an extraordinary lack of interest. The plot is composed of numerous irrelevancies, presumably to make the climax more surprising; they needn't have bothered – it isn't."

Kine Weekly wrote: "Much of the acting is raw and the direction lacks clarity, but there is no denying the virility of its surface action. Hollywood's reply to our No Orchids for Miss Blandish, it thoroughly deserves the "X" certificate. ... The picture heavily flavours mayhem and murder with sex, but other than sensation seekers may find the frenzied brew somewhat hard to swallow and far from pleasant to the palate. Biff Elliot is aptly named, but his pugilistic style fails to conceal his lack of real acting ability as Mike. Peggie Castle has her moments and disarms as Charlotte, and Preston Foster registers as police chief Pat, but the others, like the new star, overact. The shrewdly varied settings are realistic but the ugly red herrings and trail of corpses begin to sicken towards the end."

Variety wrote: "Harry Essex both directed and wrote the presentation from Spillane's novel of the same title. The suspense element is not too strong, but such ingredients as brutal mob strong boys, effete art collectors with criminal tendencies, sexy femmes with more basic tendencies, and a series of unsolved killings, are mixed together in satisfactory quantities for the undiscriminating entertainment seeker. ... Essex's scripting is as wordy as a radio play, but his direction compensates somewhat."

Film critic Dennis Schwartz gave the film a mixed review but lauded the work of John Alton, writing, "The film was lucky to have the great cinematographer John Alton cast his magic noir shots to give it at least a moody look, but because of a limited budget Alton couldn't shoot the city Christmas scene on location and had to instead just show some Christmas cards to capture the city's seasonal spirit. Alton couldn't save this dull film from the poor acting, the risible dialogue, and the lame script. Biff Elliott is the main culprit when it comes to the poor acting. He had no presence and made his macho character into an unconvincing brute, someone devoid of a personality. The actresses were all bosomy stereotypes, including Peggie Castle, Margaret Sheridan, Frances Osborne, Mary Anderson and those riotous twin sisters Tani and Dran Seitz."
