= The Iron Major =

1943 film directed by Ray Enright

- Directed by: Ray Enright; Edward Killy (associate)
- Written by: C. Bakaleinikoff; Roy Webb
- Screenplay by: Aben Kandel; Warren Duff
- Story by: Florence E. Cavanaugh
- Produced by: Robert Fellows
- Starring: Pat O'Brien; Ruth Warrick; Robert Ryan
- Cinematography: Robert de Grasse
- Edited by: Robert Wise; Philip Martin, Jr.
- Music by: Roy Webb
- Production company: RKO Radio Pictures
- Release date: October 25, 1943
- Running time: 90 minutes
- Country: United States
- Language: English
- Box office: $1 million (US rentals)

The Iron Major is a 1943 American biographical film about the famed college football coach and World War I hero, Frank Cavanaugh. Directed by Ray Enright, the screenplay was written by Aben Kandel and Warren Duff, based on Florence E. Cavanaugh's story.

Produced and directed by RKO Radio Pictures, the film premiered in Boston on October 25, 1943. The picture stars Pat O'Brien as Major Cavanaugh, along with Ruth Warrick and Robert Ryan.

== Plot ==
Florence Cavanaugh and a priest, Tim Donovan, recall how in the 1890s, her husband Frank was playing college football for Dartmouth and then moved west to become a coach. "Cav" is introduced to Florence and eventually moves back east where he coaches at Holy Cross, where the football team's players include Tim.

Although he is father to seven children, Cav enlists in the war effort. A major, he is involved in heavy combat and seriously wounded, but recovers, gaining his nickname in the process. He ultimately returns home to continue coaching at Boston College, but an illness causes Cav to go blind, then ultimately claims his life.

== Cast ==
- Pat O'Brien as Frank "Cav" Cavanaugh
- Ruth Warrick as Florence Ayres Cavanaugh
- Robert Ryan as Father Tim Donovan
- Leon Ames as Bob Stewart
- Russell Wade as Private Manning
- Bruce Edwards as Lieutenant Jones
- Richard Martin as Davie Cavanaugh

== See also ==
- List of American football films
