= My Gun Is Quick =

1950 crime novel by Mickey Spillane

- First edition (publ. E.P. Dutton)
- Author: Mickey Spillane
- Language: English
- Publication date: 1950

My Gun Is Quick (1950) is Mickey Spillane's second novel featuring private investigator Mike Hammer. It was the basis for the 1957 film of the same name.

== Plot summary ==
Private detective Mike Hammer meets a red-headed prostitute in a diner. She is hassled by a man she appears to know and fear but Mike deals with him swiftly. Despite little conversation, he gives her some money to get a real job and leaves. The next day she is found dead, the victim of an apparent hit-and-run accident. Mike does not believe this and proceeds to hunt down her murderers. In the process he uncovers a massive and powerful prostitution ring in New York.

== Reception ==
As of 1956, My Gun Is Quick had sold over 3.9 million copies.
