= The Big Kill =

1951 novel by Mickey Spillane

- First edition
- Author: Mickey Spillane
- Language: English
- Publisher: E.P. Dutton
- Publication date: 1951
- Publication place: United States
- Media type: Print (hardback)
- Pages: 224

The Big Kill (1951) is Mickey Spillane's fifth novel featuring private investigator Mike Hammer.

== Plot summary ==
Drinking at a seedy bar on a rainy night, Hammer notices a man come in with an infant. The man, named Decker, cries as he kisses the infant, then walks out in the rain and is shot dead. Hammer shoots the assailant as he searches Decker's body. The driver of the getaway car runs over the man Hammer shot to ensure that he won't talk. Hammer takes care of the child and vows revenge on the person behind the deed.

Next morning Mike awakens to the telephone ringing and to find the kid making a play for Mike's .45. After getting an elderly retired nurse from downstairs to look after the kid, Mike visits friend and police chief Pat Chambers, who reads a report to Mike about the kid's father William Decker, an ex-con gone bad. William pulled a robbery on Riverside Drive the same night prior to his murder by ex-con Arnold Basil, a stooge for Lou Grindle. After leaving Pat, Mike heads on over to the East Side where William lived and meets superintendent John Vilecks and the local Father who said that William was playing it straight and left a will to take care of the kid. William's only visitor was fellow dock worker Mel Hooker. Mike heads on over to Riverside Drive, the site of the robbery to meet Marsha Lee an ex-Hollywood actress who was hurt in the robbery. Marsha thinks the robbery was really planned for the apartment above hers since she had nothing of real value to steal.

Hammer's trail of vengeance leads him to hostile encounters with his police friend Pat Chambers, the District Attorney and his stooges, as well as beatings, assassination attempts, and torture from gangsters that Hammer reciprocates.

Hammer also has loving encounters with two women he meets on his quest. Marsha is a former Hollywood Actress who was beaten by Decker when he robbed her flat. Ellen is the estranged daughter of a rich horse breeder who works for the D.A..
