= Biff Elliot =

American actor (1923–2012)

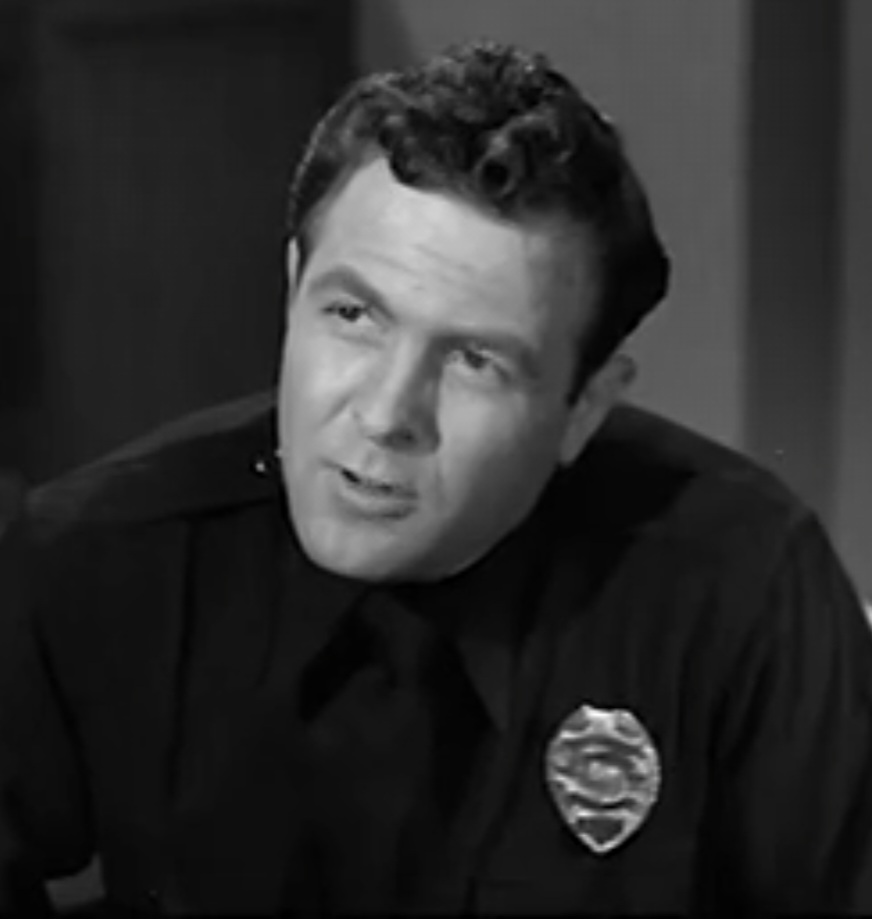
- Elliot in an episode of The Public Defender (1954)
- Born: Leon Shalek; July 26, 1923; Lynn, Massachusetts, U.S.
- Died: August 15, 2012 (aged 89); Studio City, California, U.S.
- Resting place: Westwood Village Memorial Park Cemetery
- Education: University of Maine
- Occupation: Actor
- Years active: 1948–2001
- Spouses: Betty Dole (m. 1948; died 1974) Connie Elliot (m. 1977)

Biff Elliot (born Leon Shalek; July 26, 1923 – August 15, 2012) was an American actor. He is perhaps best known for his role as detective Mike Hammer in the 1953 version of I, the Jury.

== Early life ==
Elliot was born in Lynn, Massachusetts, the son of Susan (née Bernstein) and Israel Shalek. He was the youngest of three brothers. His ancestors were Jewish immigrants from Eastern Europe.

He attended the University of Maine and played on the freshman football team.

From 1943 he served three years with the 34th Infantry Regiment in World War II.

== Career ==
Elliot, who had acted during his college years, abandoned writing to pursue television roles. He appeared in many important dramatic shows of the time, mostly playing tough, working-class characters.

When Elliot was spotted by a Hollywood attorney while performing in a television episode, the attorney recommended him to Victor Saville, the producer who was preparing the first film adaption of Mickey Spillane's I, the Jury. After securing the part following a 15-minute audition, Elliot was brought to Hollywood and prepared for the role by reading Mike Hammer novels, often spending the entire night reading them. I, the Jury became Elliot's first leading film role, and he was the first actor to portray the Mike Hammer character in a film. Although Elliot was signed to a long-term contract as Mike Hammer, other actors were later cast in the role.

In 2004 Elliot recorded a commentary track for I, the Jury.

Over the next few years, Elliot became a prominent fixture in war films of the 1950s and 1960s, appearing in Between Heaven and Hell, The Enemy Below, Pork Chop Hill and PT 109. In 1959, playwright Clifford Odets, who had noticed Elliot in I, the Jury, offered him a role in The Story on Page One, which Odets wrote and directed. In the 1960s, Elliot appeared mostly in television, including appearance on Frank Lovejoy's detective series Meet McGraw and on Perry Mason. In 1961 Elliot played the part of Buddy Blue, a trumpeter on the run from a gangster, in the series 77 Sunset Strip. In 1966, he portrayed a government agent in an episode of the comedy series The Dick Van Dyke Show. In 1967, he appeared in the Star Trek episode "The Devil in the Dark". He guest-starred in an episode of Gibbsville in 1976. In 1977, he had a memorable supporting role in Telly Savalas's Beyond Reason with Diana Muldaur. In 1974, Elliot costarred in two episodes of the Planet of the Apes series, playing an orangutan in one of them. Elliot make his final film appearance in the 1986 film That's Life!. His last appearance on television was in 1986 on the set of the television series of Starman. Elliot retired in 2001.

== Death ==
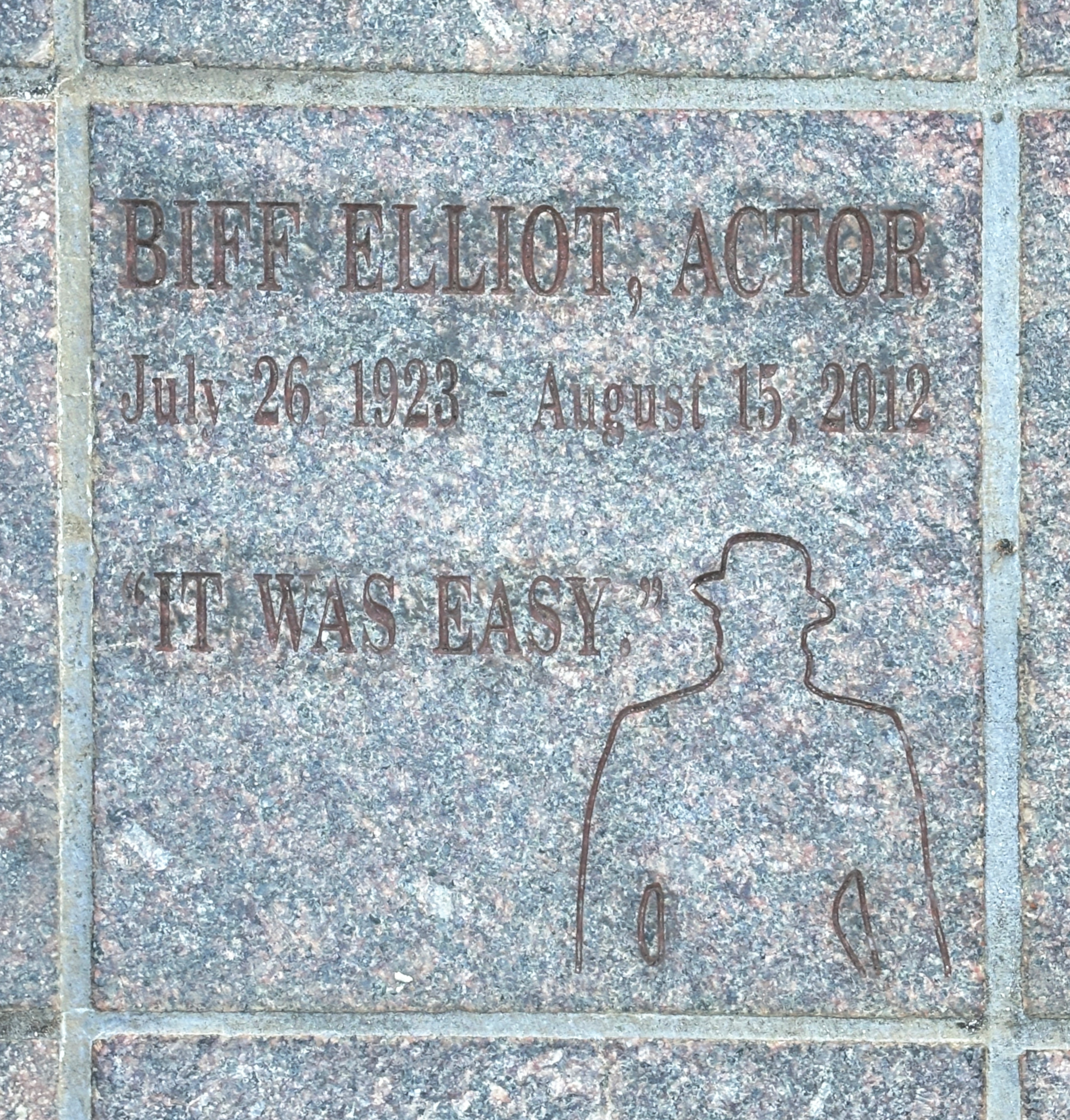
Westwood Village Memorial Park Cemetery: "It was easy"

Elliot died at his home in Studio City, California, on August 15, 2012, at the age of 89. He was buried in Westwood Village Memorial Park Cemetery.

== Partial filmography ==
- I, the Jury (1953) - Mike Hammer
- House of Bamboo (1955) - Webber
- Good Morning, Miss Dove (1955) - Reverend Alex Burnham
- Between Heaven and Hell (1956) - Tom Thumb, Company G
- The True Story of Jesse James (1957) - Jim Younger
- The Enemy Below (1957) - Quartermaster
- Torpedo Run (1958) - Lieutenant Paul Buckeye (uncredited)
- Pork Chop Hill (1959) - Private Boven
- The Story on Page One (1959) - Eddie Ritter (uncredited)
- Perry Mason (1959) (Season 2 Episode 30: "The Case of the Lame Canary") - Jimmy McLain
- Alfred Hitchcock Presents (1960) (Season 5 Episode 20: "The Day of the Bullet") - Mr. Kovacs
- Alfred Hitchcock Presents (1960) (Season 5 Episode 32: "One Grave Too Many") - Lieutenant Bates
- Alfred Hitchcock Presents (1961) (Season 6 Episode 16: "A Crime for Mothers") - Phil Ames
- Alfred Hitchcock Presents (1961) (Season 6 Episode 37: "Make My Death Bed") - Dr. Bob Hudson
- Alfred Hitchcock Presents (1961) (Season 7 Episode 2: "Bang! You're Dead") - Fred Chester
- PT 109 (1963) - Seaman Edgar E. Mauer
- Combat! (1963) (Episode: "The Party") as Rafferty
- Brainstorm (1965) - Detective (uncredited)
- Blood Bath (1966) - Cafe Manager
- Destination Inner Space (1966) - Dr. Wilson
- The Navy vs. the Night Monsters (1966) - Commander Arthur Simpson
- Combat! (1966) (Episode: "The Outsider") as Doctor
- The Girl Who Knew Too Much (1969) - Archie
- The Day of the Wolves (1971) - The Inspector
- The Hard Ride (1971) - Mike
- Kotch (1971) - Motel Manager
- Mission: Impossible (1972) (Episode: "Casino") as Mel Simpson
- Cool Breeze (1972) - Lieutenant Carl Mager
- Save the Tiger (1973) - Tiger Petitioner
- This Is a Hijack (1973) - Neal Hanaford
- The Front Page (1974) - Police Dispatcher
- Planet of the Apes (1974) (Episode: The Cure) - Orangutan
- The Wild McCullochs (1975) - Ralph
- The Dark (1979) - Detective Jack Bresler
- Beyond Reason (1985) - Police Sergeant
- That's Life! (1986) - Belmont
