= Kiss Me Deadly =

1955 film by Robert Aldrich

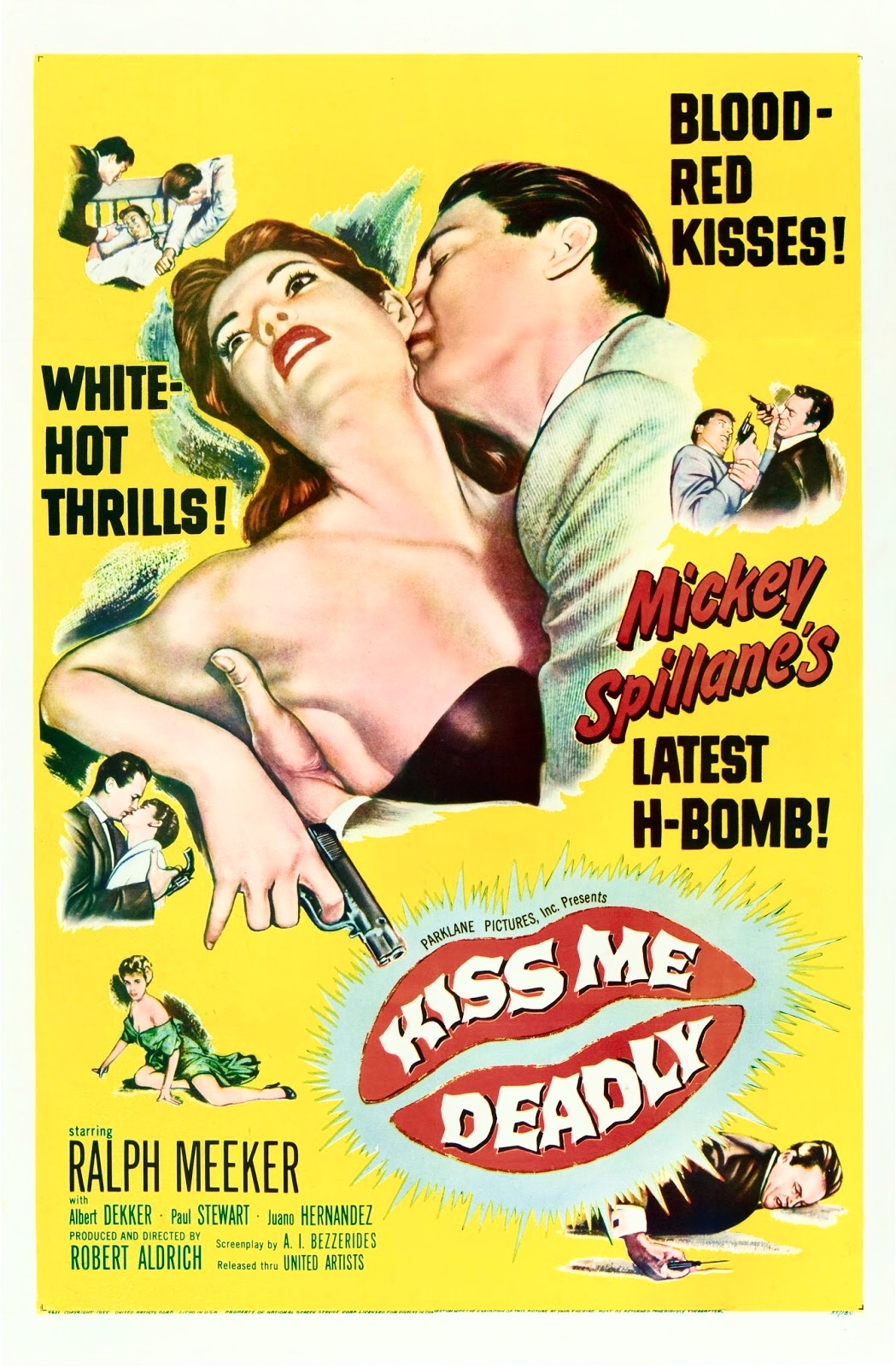
- Theatrical release poster
- Directed by: Robert Aldrich
- Screenplay by: A.I. Bezzerides; Robert Aldrich (uncredited)
- Based on: Kiss Me, Deadly; 1952 novel by Mickey Spillane
- Produced by: Robert Aldrich
- Starring: Ralph Meeker; Albert Dekker; Paul Stewart; Juano Hernandez
- Cinematography: Ernest Laszlo
- Edited by: Michael Luciano
- Music by: Frank De Vol
- Production company: Parklane Pictures
- Distributed by: United Artists
- Release date: May 18, 1955
- Running time: 106 minutes
- Country: United States
- Language: English
- Budget: $410,000
- Box office: $726,000 (USA/Canada) $226,000 (foreign); 436,699 admissions (France)

Kiss Me Deadly is a 1955 American film noir produced and directed by Robert Aldrich, starring Ralph Meeker, Albert Dekker, Paul Stewart, Juano Hernandez, and Wesley Addy. It also features Maxine Cooper and Cloris Leachman appearing in their feature film debuts. The film follows a private investigator in Los Angeles who becomes embroiled in a complex mystery after picking up a female hitchhiker. The screenplay was written by Aldrich and A.I. Bezzerides, based on the 1952 crime novel Kiss Me, Deadly by Mickey Spillane.

Kiss Me Deadly grossed $726,000 in the United States and $226,000 overseas. The film received the condemnation of the United States Senate Subcommittee on Juvenile Delinquency, which accused it of being "designed to ruin young viewers", a verdict that director Aldrich protested. Despite initial critical disapproval, it is considered one of the most important and influential film noirs of all time.

The film has been noted as a stylistic precursor to the French New Wave, and has been cited as a major influence on a number of filmmakers, including François Truffaut, Jean-Luc Godard, Alex Cox, and Quentin Tarantino. In 1999, Kiss Me Deadly was selected for preservation in the United States National Film Registry by the Library of Congress as being "culturally, historically, or aesthetically significant".

== Plot ==
Mike Hammer is a tough private investigator who, with the assistance of his associate and lover Velda, typically works on "penny-ante divorce cases." One evening, Hammer is forced to suddenly stop his sports car by Christina, an escapee from a nearby psychiatric hospital, who is running barefoot along the road, wearing nothing but a trench coat. Hammer gives her a ride. Christina asks him, whatever happens, to "remember me," alluding to a poem by Christina Rossetti. Thugs waylay them, and Hammer hears Christina screaming as she is tortured to death. The thugs then push Hammer's car off a cliff with Christina's body and an unconscious Hammer inside.

Hammer comes to in a hospital with Velda hovering over him. He decides to investigate Christina's death, believing that it "must be connected with something big." He retrieves a book of poetry from the dead woman's apartment and reads aloud several lines from Rossetti's poem, "Remember", as he tries to figure out what that something might be.

Hammer goes to the apartment of Lily Carver, who says she was Christina's roommate. Lily tells Hammer she is in hiding and asks him to protect her. Hammer later arrives at the lavish mansion of gangster Carl Evello. Hammer fends off Charlie Max and Sugar Smallhouse, two of Evello's henchmen, and then confronts Evello, who is initially impressed by Hammer's brazenness and offers to work out a deal, but swiftly retracts the offer.

Hammer's friend, Nick the auto mechanic, who helped defuse bombs planted in Hammer's car, is then murdered. Carl's thugs kidnap Hammer and take him to an isolated beach house, where another of their associates, Dr. G. E. Soberin (revealed to be responsible for the murders of Christina and Nick), injects him with sodium pentothal before interrogating him.

Carl Evello comes in to question him, but gets nothing. Mike manages to work one hand free from the ropes. He calls out and Carl returns. He lures Carl over and knocks him out. Mike pretends to be Evello and summons Sugar in to kill Mike. Sugar enters the darkened room and stabs his boss, thinking it is Mike. Mike kills Sugar and escapes.

Mike determines that Christina had hidden a key for him to find. In a locker at the Hollywood Athletic Club, he locates the suspiciously hot box, which burns his arm. But when he goes to his friend Lieutenant Murphy for help, Murphy warns him off, hinting it has to do with a top-secret government experiment akin to the Manhattan Project.

Hammer goes back to the beach house. Before he arrives, Lily, now revealed to be an imposter named Gabrielle, is there with Soberin. They have the box, and have Velda locked in a bedroom. Gabrielle shoots Soberin to get the box for herself. With his dying words, Soberin urges the insatiably curious Gabrielle not to open it.

When Hammer comes into the room, Gabrielle says, "Kiss me, Mike," and shoots him. She then opens the box, which emits a blinding light and piercing sound. Gabrielle screams and bursts into flames. Hammer, wounded, struggles to his feet and looks for Velda. Together, the pair flee the burning house, helping each other along the beach to the ocean as the house explodes behind them and becomes consumed in flames.

== Cast ==
- Ralph Meeker as Mike Hammer
- Albert Dekker as Dr. G. E. Soberin
- Paul Stewart as Carl Evello
- Juano Hernandez as Eddie Yeager
- Wesley Addy as Lt. Pat Murphy
- Maxine Cooper as Velda Wakeman
- Cloris Leachman as Christina Bailey
- Gaby Rodgers as Lily Carver / Gabrielle
- Marion Carr as Friday
- Fortunio Bonanova as Carmen Trivago
- Nick Dennis as Nick
- Jack Elam as Charlie Max
- Percy Helton as Doc Kennedy
- Jack Lambert as Sugar Smallhouse
- Strother Martin as Harvey Wallace
- Paul Richards as Paul Richards
- Leigh Snowden as Cheesecake
- Kitty White as nightclub singer

== Production ==
=== Development ===
In October 1954 Robert Aldrich announced he would produce and direct two Mickey Spillane stories the following year, for Parklane Productions, an independent company owned by Victor Saville. The stories would be Kiss Me, Deadly and My Gun Is Quick. Saville turned over control to Aldrich because he was busy on The Silver Chalice.

The screenplay was loosely adapted by A.I. Bezzerides with contributions from Aldrich, though it "made no effort to follow the book's convoluted plot, [though] both are structured around [a] search for a mysterious box."

=== Differences from the novel ===
Kiss Me Deadly departs from other Mike Hammer films in that Hammer never carries a gun. This is explained when Lt. Murphy tells Hammer his PI license and gun permit have been revoked. Although he is held at gunpoint, pistol whipped, and even shot, he complies with the gun ban, relying only on his fists to hammer people into submission or worse. The screenplay also departs from Spillane's novel, replacing the mafia conspiracy at the center of the novel with an apparent case of espionage and a mysterious suitcase serving as the film's MacGuffin. The film further departs from the book by portraying Hammer not so much as a sleuth of the hardboiled school than as a sleazy, narcissistic bully, perhaps the darkest private detective in film noir.

Much to the derision of the local police, Hammer makes his living mostly by blackmailing adulterers, he or his secretary sometimes seducing and entrapping the targets themselves, a practice perhaps made even worse because Hammer seems to exploit the genuine affection that Velda feels for him to get her participation. He readily resorts to violence, whether he's defending himself against the thugs Evello sends to kill him, breaking a potential informant's treasured record to get him to talk, or roughing up a coroner who has the temerity to demand payment in return for a key that Christina had apparently swallowed before her death. Bezzerides wrote of the script: "I wrote it fast because I had contempt for it... I tell you Spillane didn't like what I did with his book. I ran into him at a restaurant and, boy, he didn't like me".

=== Los Angeles locations ===
Kiss Me Deadly is a time capsule of Los Angeles, much of it filmed in the downtown neighborhood of Bunker Hill. Many of the locations disappeared in the urban development of the late 1960s, although a few remain.

- The Hill Crest Hotel, NE corner of Third and Olive Streets (Italian opera singer's home)
- The Donigan 'Castle', a Victorian mansion at 325 S. Bunker Hill Avenue (where Cloris Leachman's character lived, used for interior and exterior shots)
- Apartment Building, 10401 Wilshire Boulevard, NW corner of Wilshire and Beverly Glen (Hammer's apartment building; still standing)
- Carl Evello's Mansion, 603 Doheny Road, Beverly Hills, California
- Clay Street, an alley on Bunker Hill beneath the Angels Flight funicular (still operating), where Hammer parks his Corvette and then takes the back steps up to the Hill Crest Hotel, although when he approaches the hotel's large porch, he is on the Third Street steps opposite Angels Flight
- Club Pigalle, 4135 S. Figueroa Avenue (the black jazz nightclub that Hammer frequents)
- Hollywood Athletic Club, 6525 W. Sunset Blvd. (where Hammer finds the radioactive box; still standing)

== Release ==
Trailer for Kiss Me Deadly

=== Critical response and analysis ===
Critics have generally viewed the film as a metaphor for the paranoia and fear of nuclear war that prevailed during the Cold War era. "The great whatsit," as Velda refers to the object of Hammer's quest, turns out to be a mysterious valise, hot to the touch because of the dangerous, glowing substance it contains, a metaphor for the atomic bomb. The film has been described as "the definitive, apocalyptic, nihilistic, science-fiction film noir of all time – at the close of the classic noir period." A leftist at the time of the Hollywood blacklist, Bezzerides denied any conscious intention for this metaphor in his script, saying that "I was having fun with it. I wanted to make every scene, every character, interesting."

Film critic Nick Schager wrote, "Never was Mike Hammer's name more fitting than in Kiss Me Deadly, Robert Aldrich's blisteringly nihilistic noir in which star Ralph Meeker embodies Mickey Spillane's legendary P.I. with brute force savagery... The gumshoe's subsequent investigation into the woman's death doubles as a lacerating indictment of modern society's dissolution into physical/moral/spiritual degeneracy – a reversion that ultimately leads to nuclear apocalypse and man's return to the primordial sea – with the director's knuckle-sandwich cynicism pummeling the genre's romantic fatalism into a bloody pulp. 'Remember me?' Aldrich's sadistic, fatalistic masterpiece is impossible to forget". Rotten Tomatoes reports that 97% of its critics gave the film a positive review, with an average rating of 8.1/10, based on 37 reviews. The consensus states, "An intriguing, wonderfully subversive blend of art and commerce, Kiss Me Deadly is an influential noir classic."

François Truffaut wrote, "To appreciate Kiss Me Deadly, you have to love movies passionately and to have a vivid memory of those evenings when you saw Scarface, Under Capricorn, Le sang d'un poète (Blood of a Poet), Les Dames du Bois de Boulogne, and The Lady From Shanghai. We have loved films that had only one idea, or twenty, or even fifty. In Aldrich's films, it is not unusual to encounter a new idea with each shot. In this movie the inventiveness is such that we don't know what to look at--the images are almost too full, too fertile. Watching a film like this is such an intense experience that we want it to go last for hours. It is easy to picture its author as a man overflowing with vitality, as much at ease behind a camera as Henry Miller facing a blank page. This is the film of a young director who is not yet worried about restraint."

=== Accolades ===
Institution	Year	Category	Result	Ref.
American Film Institute	2001	AFI's 100 Years...100 Thrills	Nominated	
American Film Institute	2005	AFI's 100 Years...100 Movie Quotes	Nominated (Note: Nominated for dialogue: Christina: "Get me to that bus stop and forget you ever saw me. If we don't make that bus stop..."; Mike Hammer: "We will."; Christina: "If we don't, remember me.")	
American Film Institute	2008	AFI's 10 Top 10 – Mystery Film	Nominated	

=== Home media ===
Metro-Goldwyn-Mayer released the film on VHS as part of their "Vintage Classics" collection in 1999, and on DVD in 2001, with the alternative ending as a Special Feature. A digitally restored version of the film was released on DVD and Blu-ray by The Criterion Collection in June 2011, and also includes the alternative ending.

=== Revised ending ===
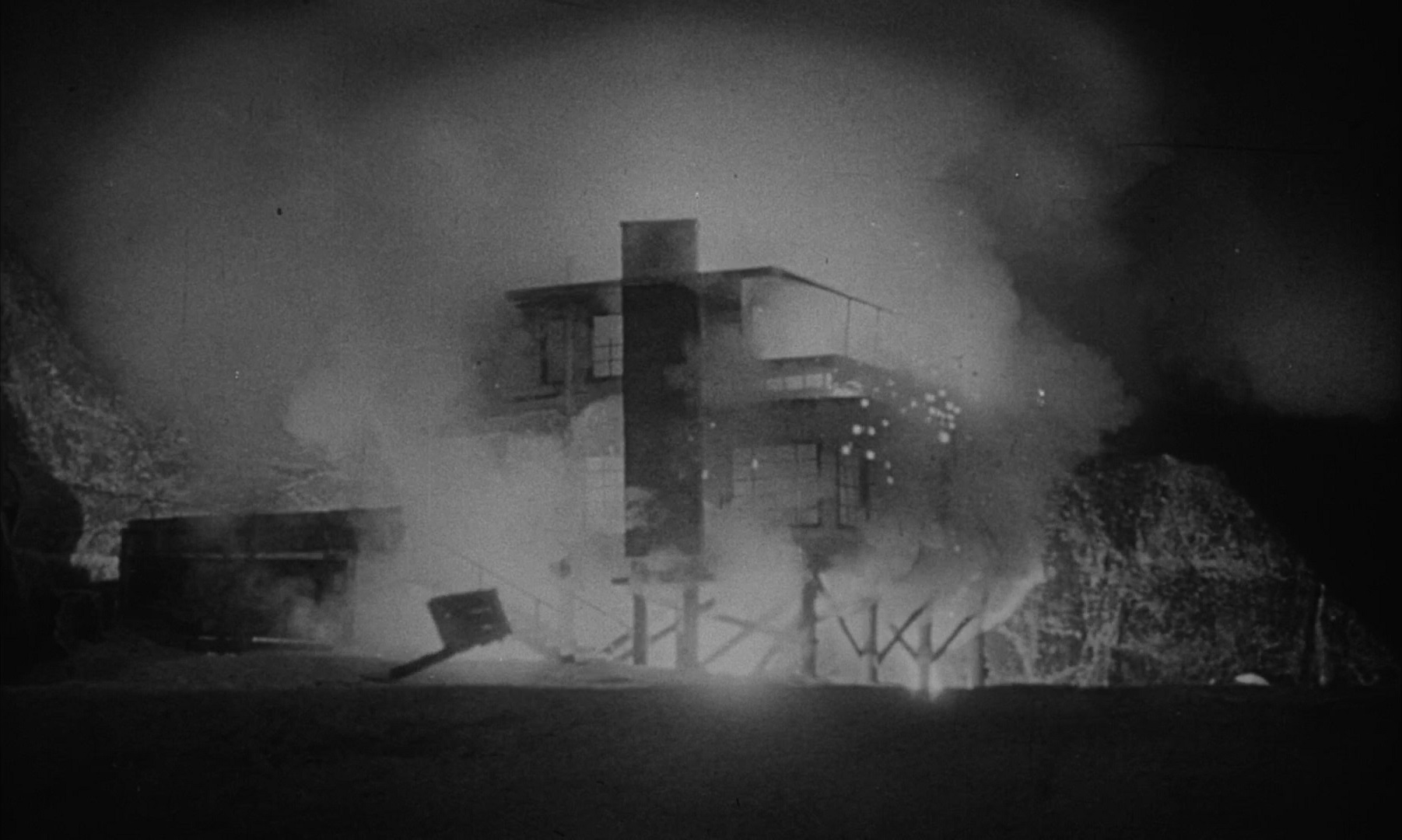
The final scene, which some have interpreted as an apocalyptic ending.

The original ending of the American release of the film shows Hammer and Velda escaping from the burning house, staggering into the ocean as the words "The End" come over them on the screen. Sometime after its first release, the ending was altered on the film's negative, removing 82 seconds of footage showing the escape, and instead superimposing "The End" over the burning house. This implied that Hammer and Velda perished in the blaze, which some have interpreted as an apocalyptic ending. In 1997, the original ending was restored after the missing footage was discovered in the vaults of the Directors Guild by Glenn Erickson.

== Influence ==
Contemporary film scholars have named Kiss Me Deadly as one of the most influential examples of American film noir, praising its bleak and nihilistic tone, its version of pulp fiction archetypes, and its twist ending. Its apocalyptic elements earned it an entry in The Encyclopedia of Science Fiction. Kiss Me Deadly has been cited as a stylistic precursor of the French New Wave. François Truffaut has acknowledged its influence on his "elliptic" filmmaking style, as has Jean-Luc Godard. In the 1960s, both filmmakers touted the film as the single American film "most responsible for the French New Wave." Homage is paid to the glowing suitcase MacGuffin in Alex Cox's Repo Man (1984), Quentin Tarantino's Pulp Fiction (1994) and John Frankenheimer's Ronin (1998). The "shiny blue suitcase" is mentioned with other famous MacGuffins in Guardians of the Galaxy. When the Ark of the Covenant in Raiders of the Lost Ark (1981) is opened, the shot of Rene Belloq's face melting is directly inspired by that of Gabrielle opening the suitcase.

In Southland Tales (2006), Richard Kelly pays homage to the film, showing the main characters watching the beginning on their television; later the opening of the case is shown on screens on board the mega-Zeppelin. Two notable rock acts have borrowed the film's title for a song title. The first was the UK punk act Generation X, featuring singer Billy Idol, from their self titled debut LP (1978); this song would be also be featured on the soundtrack to SLC Punk! (1998). The second was a 1988 hit single from former Runaways lead guitarist and glam metal solo performer Lita Ford. In 1999, Kiss Me Deadly was selected for preservation in the United States National Film Registry by the Library of Congress as being "culturally, historically, or aesthetically significant."

== See also ==
- List of American films of 1955
- List of cult films

== Sources ==
- Arnold, Bill; Miller, Eugene L. (1986). The Films and Career of Robert Aldrich. Knoxville, Tennessee: University of Tennessee Press. ISBN 978-0-870-49504-5.
- Collins, Max Allan; Traylor, James L. (2018). Mickey Spillane on Screen: A Complete Study of the Television and Film Adaptations. Jefferson, North Carolina: McFarland. ISBN 978-0-786-49242-8.
- Parish, James Robert and Michael R. Pitts. The Great Science Fiction Pictures. Jefferson, North Carolina: McFarland & Company, 1977. ISBN 0-8108-1029-8.
- Silver, Alain; Ursini, James (1995). Whatever Happened to Robert Aldrich?. New York: Limelight. ISBN 978-0-879-10185-5.
- Strick, Philip. Science Fiction Movies. London: Octopus Books Limited, 1976. ISBN 0-7064-0470-X.
- Warren, Bill. Keep Watching The Skies: Science Fiction Films of the Fiftees Vol I: 1950–1957. Jefferson, North Carolina: McFarland & Company, 1982. ISBN 0-89950-032-3.
