= The Girl Hunters =

1962 novel by Mickey Spillane

- First edition
- Author: Mickey Spillane
- Language: English
- Genre: Crime fiction
- Publisher: E.P. Dutton
- Publication place: United States
- Media type: Print (Hardcover and Paperback)
- Pages: 218

The Girl Hunters is a 1962 novel by Mickey Spillane, featuring private investigator Mike Hammer. The same year it was published, it was announced that it would be adapted for the screen with Spillane himself playing Mike Hammer.

== Plot ==
Hammer has been a drunk living in gutters around New York City for the past seven years. Hammer's secretary and fiancée, Velda, is believed to be dead after a botched protection job involving a Chicago socialite and her new husband. Then, Hammer is apprehended and taken to an undisclosed location, where he is interrogated by former friend Captain Pat Chambers. Chambers, who blames Hammer for Velda's death, pummels him repeatedly, but slacks off. Richie Cole, a dock worker, is dying of severe gunshot wounds at City General Hospital and has insisted on talking to Hammer exclusively to reveal the identity of his killer. Hammer, upon interviewing the victim, discovers that Velda is still alive and facing execution by a top level Soviet assassin dubbed "The Dragon", her only chance being Hammer finding her first. The man tells Hammer that he has left clues to her location, but dies immediately afterwards.

The alarming news causes Hammer to sober up and prepare to go out on his own, despite being out of commission. He soon discovers the pressure is on from Pat to discover the killer's identity. Despite many threats, Hammer successfully brushes off Chambers, but then finds himself being muscled by a Federal Agent named Art Rickerby. Rickerby reveals to Hammer that Richie Cole was a field agent and his former protégé. In order to gain information and gun carrying privileges, Hammer makes deals with Rickerby, the condition being that Hammer brings him the Dragon alive.

Hammer's investigations lead him to Laura Knapp, the widow of a Senator also murdered by the Dragon. Whilst gaining more clues from Laura and death attempts by the Dragon, Hammer hurries to find Velda, as the clock is ticking, and time is not on his side.

== Film version ==
A restored print was screened at the 2010 edition of the Festival de Cannes as an Official Selection of the Cinéma de la Plage.
