= Peck's Bad Girl (TV series) =

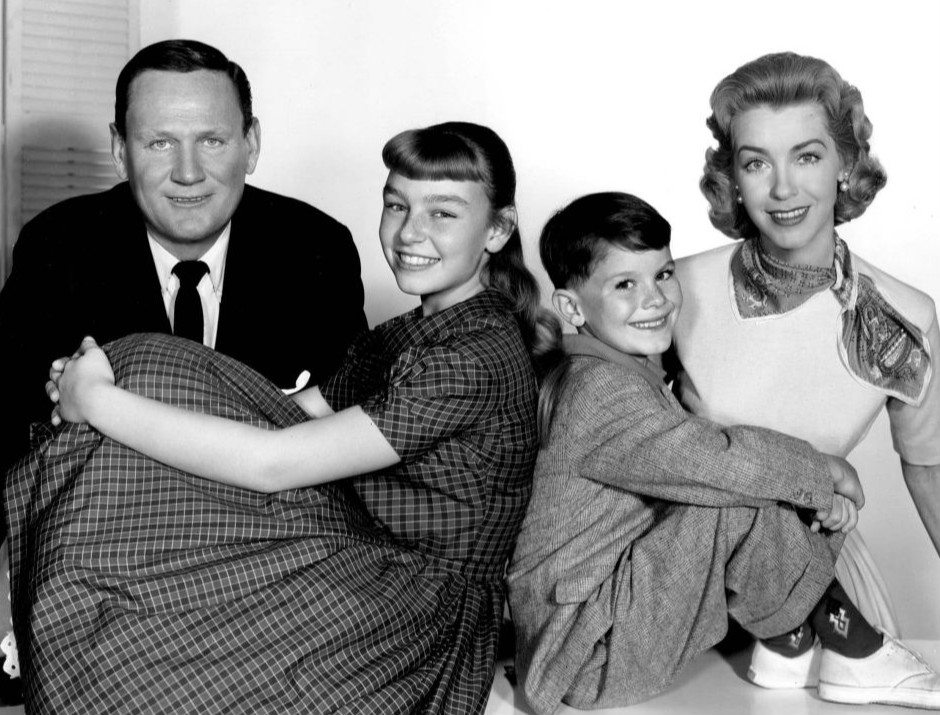
- The cast of Peck's Bad Girl: From left: Wendell Corey, Patty McCormack, Ray Farrell, Marsha Hunt
- Genre: Situation comedy
- Starring: Wendell Corey; Patty McCormack; Ray Farrell; Marsha Hunt; Reba Waters
- Country of origin: United States
- Original language: English
- No. of seasons: 1
- No. of episodes: 14

Production
- Executive producer: Norman Felton
- Producer: Stanley Rubin
- Running time: 30 minutes
- Production company: Talent Associates

Original release
- Network: CBS
- Release: 5 May – 24 August 1959

Peck's Bad Girl is a 1959 American sitcom television series, starring Wendell Corey and Patty McCormack which aired on CBS. The show revolved around the misadventures of a twelve-year-old girl growing up and how she related to her family. Patty McCormack, who had played a sinister little girl in The Bad Seed, played the lead character, Torey Peck. The title drew inspiration from the Peck's Bad Boy stories.

The show was presented as a family comedy centered on Torey, who would talk directly to the audience about herself and the events from in front of a black screen at points during the episode. Peck's Bad Girl replaced the Arthur Godfrey Show.

The New York Times said in its review of the show: "PECK'S BAD GIRL, which had its debut... is another situation-comedy series on family life and a further reminder of the sustained superiority of Father Knows Best." After its poor reception in 1959, CBS re-ran the entire series in the summer of 1960 to no better success.

== Cast ==
- Patty McCormack as Torey Peck, twelve-year-old girl
- Wendell Corey as Steve Peck, her father
- Marsha Hunt as Jennifer Peck, her mother
- Ray Ferrell as Roger Peck, her younger brother
- Reba Waters as Francesca, her girlfriend

Guest stars included Jane Withers, Patrick O'Neal and Jacques Bergerac.
