= The Bad Seed (1985 film) =

1985 television film by Paul Wendkos

- Genre: Drama; Horror mystery
- Based on: The Bad Seed by Maxwell Anderson; The Bad Seed by William March
- Written by: George Eckstein
- Directed by: Paul Wendkos
- Starring: Blair Brown; Lynn Redgrave; David Carradine; Carrie Wells; Richard Kiley; David Ogden Stiers; Chad Allen
- Music by: Paul Chihara
- Country of origin: United States
- Original language: English

Production
- Producer: George Eckstein
- Cinematography: Ted Voigtlander
- Editor: Steven Cohen (as Steve Cohen)
- Running time: 95 minutes
- Production companies: Hajeno Productions; Warner Bros. Television

Original release
- Network: ABC
- Release: February 7, 1985

The Bad Seed is a 1985 American made-for-television horror film directed by Paul Wendkos for ABC Television.

In the film, freak fatal accidents force a widow to realize her precocious 9-year-old daughter was born to kill. Based on the William March novel The Bad Seed (1954), the film is a remake of the original film The Bad Seed (1956) as directed by Mervyn LeRoy.

The scenes at fictional Fern Academy were shot at the AFI Conservatory in Los Feliz.

== Plot ==
Rachel Penmark is upset at having lost a school penmanship medal to her classmate Mark Daigler. During a school trip to the beach, Mark refuses to give Rachel the medal and she chases him onto a fishing pier. Alice Fern, their teacher, notices Mark missing during a roll call. Search teams find him unconscious on the shore near the pier. His death is ruled an accidental drowning.

Rachel's mother, Christine Penmark, talks to her neighbors Monica and Emory Breedlove about the deaths Rachel has been exposed to, including television news reports about her own father's death and the death of their neighbor, Mrs. Post, who adored Rachel and accidentally fell down the stairs. Christine worries Rachel appears unaffected by Mark's death but Monica and Emory assure her it is normal for children to have a defense mechanism to process such things. Christine asks about a book Emory is writing about female serial killers, and he discusses the case of Bessie Danker. Christine's father, Richard Bravo, had investigated the same story years earlier and recognized the name. When the maintenance man, Leroy Jessup, teases Rachael she's not sorry about Mark's death, she shows no remorse.

Ms. Fern, of the Fern Academy, tells Christine that Rachel won't be welcomed back after the end of the current school term, claiming Rachel was seen arguing with Mark who was last seen running from her. Rachel's denials convince Ms. Fern she's lying. Mark's parents, Rita and Fred Daigler, confront Christine and Rachel when they return home. Rita says she knows Rachel was the last person to see Mark alive, and she is looking for the medal, knowing it meant a great deal to Mark. Christine apologizes and swears to their ignorance of its location. As she leaves, Rita mentions Mark's body had been left bruised.

Monica had gifted Rachel a locket, and comes by to retrieve it so she can have the birthstone changed for her. When Christine looks for the locket she's horrified to find the penmanship medal. Rachel admits she lied, and had actually asked Mark if she could see the medal, and after refusing he agreed to her offer of money to let her carry it around. She says she lied because she thought people would think she stole it. When Larry later accuses her again of killing Mark, she brings up things she knows about him and they threaten each other with blackmail.

Christine considers whether a lack of morality can be hereditary and has a nightmare that she's a little girl being chased through a cornfield by a woman with a knife, Bessie Danker. The next day, Richard confirms the details of Christine's recurring nightmare are actually true memories. She was adopted after Bessie Danker was arrested. They did not tell her about it because they thought she was too young to remember, and Christine worries Rachel may have inherited psychopathy from Bessie.

Leroy continues to taunt Rachel, mentioning that trace evidence of blood can be found even if someone tries to wash it away and telling her there is an electric chair for children. Emory confirms Leroy is correct, and Christine later catches Rachel trying to dispose of her cleated shoes. She realizes the cleats correspond to crescent-shaped bruises left on Mark's body. Leroy lies to Rachel, claiming he got her shoes out of the incinerator before they burned up. He becomes her next victim when she sets a shed on fire with him locked inside. Christine gives Rachel and an overdose of sleeping pills and kills herself with a revolver. Rachel survives and goes to live with Richard.

== Cast ==
- Blair Brown as Christine Penmark
- Lynn Redgrave as Monica Breedlove
- David Carradine as Leroy Jessup
- Carrie Wells as Rachel Penmark
- Richard Kiley as Richard Bravo
- David Ogden Stiers as Emory Breedlove
- Chad Allen as Mark Daigler
- Eve Smith as Mrs. Post
- Carol Locatell as Rita Daigler
- Weldon Bleiler as Fred Daigler
- Anne Haney as Alice Fern
- Rebecca Birken as young Christine Danker

== In pop culture ==
In the Mary Downing Hahn horror novel Wait Till Helen Comes (1986), published the year after The Bad Seed (1985) was first broadcast, the protagonist Molly remembers watching The Bad Seed on television and ponders whether her stepsister Heather is like Rachel Penmark.

== See also ==
- The Bad Seed (1954), original source novel
- The Bad Seed (1954), original play based on novel
- The Bad Seed (1956), original film based on novel and play
- Wait Till Helen Comes (1986), horror novel that references 1985 film
