= The Good Son (film) =

1993 film by Joseph Ruben

- Theatrical release poster
- Directed by: Joseph Ruben
- Written by: Ian McEwan
- Produced by: Joseph Ruben; Mary Ann Page
- Starring: Macaulay Culkin; Elijah Wood; Wendy Crewson; David Morse; Jacqueline Brookes
- Cinematography: John Lindley
- Edited by: George Bowers
- Music by: Elmer Bernstein
- Production company: 20th Century Fox
- Distributed by: 20th Century Fox
- Release date: September 24, 1993
- Running time: 86 minutes
- Country: United States
- Language: English
- Budget: $17-28 million
- Box office: $60.6 million

The Good Son is a 1993 American psychological thriller film directed by Joseph Ruben, produced and released by 20th Century Fox. It was written by English novelist Ian McEwan. Its story follows a 10-year-old boy named Mark Evans who, after the death of his mother, is sent to stay with his aunt and uncle while his father is away on a business trip. While there, Mark meets his cousin Henry, who shows signs of violent and evil behavior. The film stars Macaulay Culkin, Elijah Wood, Wendy Crewson, David Morse, Daniel Hugh Kelly, and Jacqueline Brookes.

The film was produced by Joseph Ruben and Mary Ann Page and was released on September 24, 1993. It grossed $12.5 million during its opening weekend and $60.6 million worldwide against a budget of $17 million. However, it received mixed reviews from critics.

== Plot ==
Ten-year-old Mark Evans has recently lost his mother, Janice. Before leaving on a business trip to Tokyo, Mark's father, Jack, transports him from Arizona to his Uncle Wallace and Aunt Susan's house in Rock Harbor, Maine, where he will stay during winter break. Mark is reintroduced after a decade to his extended family, including his cousins 6-year-old Connie and 10-year-old Henry; there was a third child, 3-year-old Richard, who drowned a year before. Mark and Henry get along initially and Henry seems to be nice and well-mannered. However, Henry displays an abnormal fascination with death, making Mark feel uneasy.

Henry begins to display clear signs of psychopathic behavior, which Mark is unable to raise with Wallace and Susan due to Henry's threats. One of his violent actions is throwing a dummy he calls "Mr. Highway" off a bridge and onto a highway, causing a massive vehicle pileup. Henry then plans to kill Connie, and Mark spends the night in her room out of fear that something might happen to her. The next morning, Mark awakens to find that Henry has taken Connie ice skating. At the pond, Henry purposely throws her towards thin ice, which collapses. Connie is rescued but ends up in a coma.

Although Susan does not initially believe Mark, she becomes suspicious and interrupts Henry's attempt to suffocate Connie in her hospital bed. Susan then finds a rubber duck hidden in Henry's shed — it belonged to Richard and was with him in the bathtub before he drowned. When Susan confronts Henry, he coldly reminds her that the toy had belonged to him first. Henry then flips and kindly asks for the rubber duck back. After a violent tug-of-war, he takes the toy and throws it down the well.

As Susan and Mark grow closer, Henry insinuates that he will kill Susan rather than let Mark continue to develop a relationship with her. When a fight breaks out between the two boys, Wallace locks Mark in the den. Henry asks a suspicious Susan to go for a walk with him, while Mark escapes and chases after them. Susan confronts Henry, asking him if he killed Richard, to which Henry simply replies, "What if I did?" Susan realizes that Mark was right about Henry's true nature. She tells Henry that he needs help, but Henry refuses and flees.

Susan gives chase, and upon arriving at a cliff, Henry pushes her over the edge. As Susan dangles from a branch on the cliffside, Henry tries to drop a rock on her, but Mark arrives and tackles him. Susan manages to climb back up just in time to grab hold of the boys as they roll over the edge, one in each hand. Henry holds on with both hands, but Mark's one-handed grip begins to slip. With only enough strength to save one of them, Susan releases Henry and he falls to his death. Susan pulls Mark up and they look down at Henry's corpse being washed away into the ocean.

When Mark returns home to Arizona, he reflects upon Susan's choice to save him instead of Henry. Mark wonders if she would make the same choice again, but knows it is something that he will never ask her.

== Cast ==
- Elijah Wood as Mark Evans
- Macaulay Culkin as Henry Evans
- Wendy Crewson as Susan Evans
- David Morse as Jack Evans
- Daniel Hugh Kelly as Wallace Evans
- Jacqueline Brookes as Dr. Alice Davenport
- Quinn Culkin as Connie Evans
- Ashley Crow as Janice Evans
- Rory Culkin as Richard Evans (pictured only)

== Production ==
Following the completion of his novel The Child in Time, English novelist Ian McEwan was invited by 20th Century Fox to write a screenplay "about evil – possibly concerning children." McEwan recalled, "The idea was to make a low budget, high class movie, not something that Fox would naturally make a lot of money on." Despite being well received, the result was deemed insufficiently commercial by the parties that commissioned it and it floated around Hollywood until being discovered by independent producer Mary Ann Page. Enthusiastic about the script, which was originally sent to her as a writing sample, Page tried to get the project off the ground for three and a half years. The film was briefly set up at Universal Studios, during which Brian Gilbert was attached as director. In 1988, Michael Klesic was originally cast in the role of Henry Evans. The film was soon after put on hold due to a lack of funding.

Following the successes of Home Alone and The Silence of the Lambs, which demonstrated the box-office appeal of a movie about kids and of an "extreme thriller" respectively, Fox itself chose to revisit the project, which they now saw as viable. Director Michael Lehmann (Heathers) became attached, Laurence Mark was appointed as a co-producer and McEwan was called in for rewrites. Mary Steenburgen was cast as Susan and Jesse Bradford had replaced Klesic as Henry because he had grown too old to play the part. McEwan was optimistic about the project and by November 1991, sets were being built in Maine for a production that would cost approximately $12 million. This progress was suddenly interrupted when Kit Culkin, Macaulay Culkin's father and manager, at the time a notoriously influential force in Hollywood due to the child's stardom, wanted his son to star in the film. Wishing to prove Macaulay's capacity in a dark role, he made his son's part in The Good Son a condition for his appearing in Home Alone 2: Lost in New York. Fox agreed enthusiastically due to Culkin's bankability.

As the movie was originally scheduled to shoot at the same time as Home Alone 2, the start date for The Good Son was pushed back for a year, making Steenburgen no longer available and having her replaced by Wendy Crewson but also enabling Elijah Wood's involvement. Director Lehmann and producer Mark conflicted with the imposition, leading both to leave the project. The demanding Culkin would go on to insist that Macaulay's sister, Quinn, receive a role in the film and vetted replacement director Joseph Ruben (Sleeping with the Enemy). Furthermore, the budget had risen to an estimated $20 million. McEwan found himself performing further rewrites that continued to simplify the story to satisfy Ruben's comparatively mainstream tastes and was ultimately unceremoniously removed from the project altogether when another screenwriter, Ruben's frequent collaborator David Loughery, was commissioned. Despite this, McEwan was awarded sole writing credit in arbitration when he contested a shared credit.

Principal photography took place between November 1992 and February 1993. Interiors of the Evans household were filmed in Beverly, Massachusetts, while exteriors were filmed in the Manchester-by-the-Sea village in Cape Ann and the communities of Rockport, Essex, Annisquam, Danvers, Newington, Jackson and Marblehead. The climactic cliff scene was filmed at Lake Superior’s 200-foot (61 m) cliff, Palisade Head.

== Release ==
The Good Son was theatrically released on September 24, 1993. It was released on VHS and Laserdisc by Fox Video on March 2, 1994. It proved successful in the home video market, finishing in the top 30 video rentals of 1994 in the United States. A DVD of the film was released on September 11, 2012. A Blu-ray release of The Good Son was announced on October 25, 2016 and was released on August 1, 2017.

Elmer Bernstein's score to The Good Son was released in 1993 by Fox Music. Recorded at Paramount Studios in California in August 1993, the score was orchestrated by Emilie A. Bernstein and Patrick Russ, and featured Cynthia Millar on ondes martenot.

A tie-in novel was published alongside the movie's release in 1993, written by Todd Strasser. The novel elaborates on the movie, detailing how Henry was born a sociopath, rather than being some personification of evil. In the novel, Henry's mother Susan eventually discovers that Henry is unable to understand emotions like love and sorrow, and that pleasure derived from selfish actions and the torment of others are the few things he truly feels. The book also concludes differently from the movie, ending with Mark returning to Uncle Wallace's home in Maine one year later. Mark and Susan visit Henry's grave, which includes an epitaph: "Without Darkness There Can Be No Light".

=== British release ===
In the United Kingdom, The Good Son was postponed for cinema release in light of sensitives following the murder of James Bulger in February 1993, due to their perceived similarities. It was one of several films depicting child killers to be caught up in controversy following the case, alongside Child's Play 3 (1991) and the banned Mikey (1992). As the British Board of Film Classification (BBFC) commented in their annual report, films about wicked children had become a problem for classification, with The Good Son attracting notoriety as "a child murderer played by the world's most popular child star was bound to attract media attention", though they noted its moral centre. In mid-1994, after a delay "to let bruised memories fade", The Good Son was rated 18 without cuts for cinema release by the BBFC, citing its strong violence and threat, but the cinema release was cancelled, potentially due to continuing concern about the sensitive subject matter.

The film was finally released in the UK in 1995 as a video release, but it received 33 seconds of cuts to remove part of the car pileup scene, as it was felt the possibility that such a scene would be copied by mischievous children was too great. The BBFC reasoned that the possibility of underage viewing was stronger with home video releases. The uncut version of the film was eventually released in Britain as a DVD in 2002, retaining the 18 certificate, as well as the 15 rating from the Irish Film Classification Office.

== Reception ==
=== Box office ===
The Good Son earned US$44,789,789 at the North American box office revenues, and another $15,823,219 in other territories, for a total worldwide box office take of $60,613,008.

=== Critics ===
On Rotten Tomatoes, the film had an approval rating of 25% based on 28 reviews, with an average rating of 4.6/10. The site's consensus stated: "The Good Son is never good enough to live up to its unsettling potential, failing to drum up much suspense and unable to make Macaulay Culkin a credible psychopath." On Metacritic, the film had a weighted average score of 45 out of 100 based on 17 reviews, indicating "mixed or average reviews". Audiences polled by CinemaScore gave the film an average grade of "B" on an A+ to F scale.

Roger Ebert, who deemed the film inappropriate for children, awarded it half a star, calling the project a "creepy, unpleasant experience". He and Gene Siskel later gave it "Two Thumbs Down". Many critics criticized the casting of Culkin because of his comedic image from Home Alone. Hal Hinson of The Washington Post stated that "the mere presence of the adorable boy star... seems to throw the whole film out of whack, making the picture play more like an inadvertent comedy than a thriller." Janet Maslin in The New York Times wrote that the end sequence at the cliff "is one of its few suspenseful and original moments" and "is quite literally gripping."

Paul Willinstein of The Morning Call described the film as "Home Alone meets Misery meets The Hand That Rocks the Cradle."

=== Accolades ===
Award	Category	Recipient	Result	Ref.
MTV Movie Awards	Best Villain	Macaulay Culkin	Nominated	
Saturn Awards	Best Horror Film	The Good Son	Nominated	
Saturn Awards	Best Performance by a Younger Actor	Elijah Wood	Won	

Henry Evans was included in The Guardian's 2014 list of "The 10 best fictional evil children".

=== Analysis ===
John Kenneth Muir in Horror Films of the 1990s wrote that the main difference between this and The Bad Seed was that the mother character manages to put an end to Henry's misconduct, while in the latter the mother is unable to stop Rhoda Penmark.

== See also ==
- List of films featuring psychopaths and sociopaths
- The Other (1972 film)
- The Bad Seed
- Mikey
