= Mommy (1995 film) =

1995 American film

- Directed by: Max Allan Collins
- Written by: Max Allan Collins
- Produced by: James K. Hoffman
- Starring: Patty McCormack; Sarah Jane Miller; Rachel Lemieux; Jason Miller; Brinke Stevens; Michael Cornelison; Mark Spellman
- Cinematography: Phillip W. Dingeldein
- Edited by: Phillip W. Dingeldein
- Music by: Richard Lowry
- Distributed by: M.A.C. Productions
- Release date: June 2, 1995
- Running time: 89 minutes
- Country: United States
- Language: English
- Budget: $1.1 million

Mommy is a 1995 American low budget thriller starring Patty McCormack as a mother who is psychotically obsessed with her 12-year-old daughter Jessica Ann (Rachel Lemieux).

McCormack is best known for her role as Rhoda Penmark in the 1956 film The Bad Seed. The film also stars Sarah Jane Miller, Rachel Lemieux, Jason Miller, Brinke Stevens, Michael Cornelison, Mark Spellman, Majel Barrett, Mickey Spillane, Marian Wald, Janelle Vanerstrom, Judith Meyers, Nathan Collins, Tom Castillo and Tom Summit.

== Plot ==
The movie is set in the town of Woodscreek, Iowa and narrated via voice over throughout by a twelve-year-old girl named Jessica Ann. One afternoon, her mother, known as Mrs. Sterling, visits the McKinley Elementary School Jessica Ann attends to meet with her teacher, Mrs. Withers. Jessica Ann has repeatedly won previous Student of the Year awards the last two years, but this year Mrs. Withers has decided to award the prize to another student, a Mexican boy named Eduardo Melendeez. Mrs. Sterling dislikes this decision and learns it's because he is a person of color. After Mrs. Withers refuses to change her mind about the award, Mrs. Sterling pushes her off a stepladder and breaks her neck with her bare hands.

After Mrs. Sterling tells Jessica Ann that she found her teacher dead, the police arrive led by detective Lt. March who immediately suspects that the death may not be accidental. After interviewing Mrs. Sterling, he tells her he will be in touch and implies he suspects her involvement. Mrs. Sterling has previously been married twice, first to Jessica Ann’s father and then to her second husband Mr. Sterling. During her narration, Jessica Ann reveals that her mother may have married Mr. Sterling to gain access to his finances, although he was not as rich as she first thought.

Upon returning home, Jessica Ann is comforted by her Aunt Beth, the sister of Mrs. Sterling, who later reveals to her that Mrs. Sterling is possibly not stable and unable to have the same emotions as others, although she loves her daughter very much. Mrs. Sterling’s new partner, Mark Jeffries, arrives home. Unbeknownst to Mrs. Sterling, Jessica Ann and Beth, Mark is an insurance investigator determined to find out the truth about Mr. Sterling’s death and has begun an intimate relationship with the widow to determine the truth.

The next day at school, Jessica Ann is questioned by Lt. March in the principal's office who reveals the medical examiner determined Mrs. Withers died of a broken neck, but that the injury was sustained after she fell off the ladder. Jessica Ann flashes back to dinner the previous evening where she noticed her mother opening a jar with an extremely tough grip and starts to think she may, in some way, be responsible for her teacher’s death. Lt. March also reveals that the Student of the Year plaque is missing and whoever has it may know the truth about Mrs. Withers’ death. Not wanting to suspect the truth, she dismisses the lieutenant altogether and flees the office.

Later on, Jessica Ann has a brief confrontation with the school janitor, Miss Jones, who implies that she witnessed Mrs. Sterling killing Mrs. Withers. Later that same day, Jessica Ann tells this to her mother. Realizing that the janitor may reveal the truth to the police, Mrs. Sterling tells Jessica Ann she is going to the store to get some coffee and a rental tape, but in reality, visits the school when it is dark. Confronting Miss Jones, who suggests she will blackmail her, she eventually electrocutes her by throwing a pail of water over the janitor near the school’s fuse board in the basement. Meanwhile, Jessica Ann finds the Student of the Year plaque in her mother's bedroom and realizes that she killed Mrs. Withers.

The following morning, the McKinley school principal, Mrs. Evans, reveals to Jessica Ann’s class about what happened to Miss Jones. Jessica Ann starts to think she is responsible for causing the death by telling her mother about the threats Miss Jones was making. That evening, Mrs. Sterling and Mark go out for a society dinner-dance together whilst Beth watches over her niece. Beth tries to get Jessica Ann to open up, but she is reluctant to implicate her mother any further. Whilst using the restroom at the dinner-dance, Lt. March confronts Mark and reveals he knows the truth about his background and that he may be getting too close to comfort with Mrs. Sterling. Mark angrily rebuffs his suggestions and walks out.

Later that same night, Mark receives a telephone call from his employers which is overheard by Jessica Ann. When Mark tries to explain his position to Jessica Ann in her bedroom, Mrs. Sterling walks in with a loaded pistol and shoots Mark twice in the chest and shoulder. Jessica Ann is upset but goes along with her mother’s suggestion that they lie to the police about Mark attempting to molest her. After an unproductive night of questioning, Lt. March suggests to Beth that she should look after Jessica Ann but when she attempts to do just that, she is kicked out of the house by Mrs Sterling. After a brief meeting with Lt. March and her attorney, Mr. Eckhardt, Mrs. Sterling realizes that she faces the very real possibility of being convicted for Mark’s death and decides to skip town with Jessica Ann.

Arriving at a motel several hours away from their home, Jessica Ann goes to sleep but has a nightmare of Mark rising from the dead and warning her about her mother’s mental state. Realizing she may be caught for actions, Mrs. Sterling attempts to strangle Jessica Ann while the latter is laying down, not sure of her future without her mother in her life. Jessica Ann is not sleeping however and overhears her mother talking to herself on killing her. She gets out of bed and escapes just in time, running to a disused junkyard and attempts to hide from her mother. But when both are confronted by a guard dog, Mrs. Sterling steps in to protect her daughter but is savaged by the dog in the process.

Jessica Ann goes over to where her mother was attacked by the dog, only to find the dog dead and her mother gone. Mrs. Sterling then appears back on her feet and is about to strangle Jessica Ann when Lt. March and Beth arrive on the scene. Mrs. Sterling unable to bring herself to kill Jessica Ann. Lt. March grabs Mrs. Sterling and asks why she was unable to kill the only witness to her crimes to which she responds that Jessica Ann resembled herself as her face shined in the moonlight. Mrs. Sterling is then arrested and taken away by Lt. March whilst Beth takes Jessica Ann into her care.

== Cast ==
- Patty McCormack as Mommy / Mrs. Sterling
- Sarah Jane Miller as Miss Jones, The School Janitor
- Rachel Lemieux as Jessica Ann
- Jason Miller as Lieutenant March
- Brinke Stevens as Beth Conway
- Michael Cornelison as Mark Jeffries
- Mark Spellman as Detective
- Majel Barrett as Mrs. Withers
- Mickey Spillane as Attorney Neal Ekhardt
- Marian Wald as Mrs. Evans, The Principal
- Janelle Vanerstrom as Substitute Teacher
- Judith Meyers as Hallway Teacher
- Nathan Collins as Gleeful Kid
- Tom Castillo as Ambulance Attendant #1
- Tom Summit as Ambulance Attendant #2

== Production ==
The film was the first to be directed by Max Allan Collins who had, prior to this, been primarily known as a writer of crime and mystery stories as well as a comic book writer. All of the film was shot primarily on location in Muscatine, Iowa (Collins' home town), which aided the casting of the killer's daughter. Then 11-year-old Rachel Lemieux had no prior professional acting experience; she was discovered at an open audition in an Iowa mall and beat out more than 200 girls for the role. A number of other finalists for the role ended up as extras in classroom scenes which were filmed on location at Muscatine Middle School. Max Allan Collins later revealed in the 2020 director's commentary that he initially planned on just being the film's producer but difficulties with the original director eventually left him with little choice but to take over that aspect of the film as well. Collins also revealed that the original director wanted an "older, more shapely" actress as Jessica Ann, whilst he himself favoured Rachel Lemieux and that it was this contentious point that resulted in a change of directors on the film.

The filming of Mommy was covered by Entertainment Tonight in a segment anchored by Leonard Maltin. There had been little interest in Muscatine as a filming location up until this point, so many of the local businesses were keen to support the production including the local professional photographer and the company that made the plaque for the 'Student Of The Year' award.

Despite the relatively low budget, the cast had a large number of well-known actors including Patty McCormack as the lead, Mickey Spillane as her attorney, Jason Miller as the investigating lieutenant and Majel Barrett as Jessica's school teacher at the start of the picture. Director Collins' son Nate appears in this film and its sequel in a small role as the Gleeful Kid.

Former 'scream queen' Brinke Stevens was cast as the sister of Patty McCormack's character; she was an acquaintance of writer/director Max Allan Collins, whom he had met while the two were making personal appearances at comic book conventions. When asked about her involvement with the film, Collins commented, "Brinke was happy to have a chance to do something with her clothes on, I think."

Mickey Spillane was a personal friend of writer/director Max Allan Collins and appeared in the movie as a favor. When Spillane arrived to film his part, he was ill and running a dangerously high fever. Concerned for his health, crew members tried to talk him out of filming, but he insisted on going on with the show. Despite his illness, Spillane completed all his filming and returned in better health for the sequel.

The film was initially sold to LifeTime movies on cable and was able to recoup its initial investment through additional sales. It was later released on DVD and, in 2020, as a 25th Anniversary double DVD/blu-ray package with its sequel.

== Reception ==
Critics hailed McCormack's performance and deemed the film as a spiritual successor to her 1956 film The Bad Seed.

== Sequel ==
The film spawned a sequel in 1997, with McCormack reprising her role as Mrs. Sterling in Mommy 2: Mommy's Day.
