= The Bad Seed (2018 film) =

2018 television film

- Based on: The Bad Seed by William March
- Written by: Barbara Marshall
- Directed by: Rob Lowe
- Starring: Mckenna Grace; Rob Lowe; Sarah Dugdale; Marci T. House; Lorne Cardinal; Chris Shields; Cara Buono; Patty McCormack
- Country of origin: United States
- Original language: English

Production
- Executive producers: Rob Lowe; Elizabeth Guber Stephen; Mark Wolper
- Producers: Justis Greene; Harvey Kahn
- Running time: 87 minutes
- Production companies: The Wolper Organization; Warner Bros. Television Studios

Original release
- Network: Lifetime
- Release: September 9, 2018

The Bad Seed is a 2018 American made-for-television horror drama film directed by Rob Lowe for Lifetime. Lowe is also executive producer and stars in the film, alongside Mckenna Grace, Sarah Dugdale, Marci T. House, Lorne Cardinal, Chris Shields, Cara Buono, and a special appearance by Patty McCormack. The horror thriller is based on the 1954 novel by William March, the 1954 play, and the 1956 film. The Bad Seed originally aired on Lifetime on September 9, 2018. This is the second remake of the film, the first being a 1985 film.

On September 16, 2018, a "special edition" of the TV movie was released that features behind the scenes interviews with Lowe, Grace, and McCormack.

A sequel to the film titled The Bad Seed Returns was released on September 5, 2022.

== Plot ==
Nine-year-old Emma Grossman expresses to her father, widower David Grossman, her hope to win a Citizenship medal. She shows no emotion when a cat drowns in the backyard. To her shock and disappointment, her classmate Milo Curtis is the winner of this year's medal. Later, while all the students and parents are celebrating, Emma expresses contempt for Milo to her father, who scolds her for her bitterness, which Emma quickly apologized for. However, Emma secretly lures Milo to a cliff. She steals his medal, pushes him off the cliff, and then sneaks back to the party. Milo's body is found shortly thereafter. The next day, David asks Emma about the event, but Emma acts cheerful without showing any empathy. David's sister Angela, a psychiatrist, suggests that Emma is in shock and will grieve when she is ready.

Chloe, a babysitter David hired, begins work. Emma notices Chloe stealing David's pills and blackmails her. During Milo's funeral, Emma and David speak with Milo's parents. Mrs. Curtis asks David for photos that he took of Milo during the ceremony. As David peruses the photos, he notices many capturing Emma scowling at Milo. The next day, Emma's teacher Mrs. Ellis and an investigator arrive at David's house, and Emma eavesdrops on the conversation. Mrs. Ellis explains that Milo was last seen with Emma walking into the woods, alarming David. In the next room, Chloe begins suspecting Emma of killing Milo and taunts her. To disrupt the conversation, Emma cuts her arm with shards of glass and screams, prompting Mrs. Ellis and the investigator to leave. David asks Emma if she was on the cliff with Milo, but Emma denies everything and claims Mrs. Ellis is lying. Later on, Mrs. Ellis crashes her car because of a wasp nest that was put in it earlier by Emma. Chloe discovers Milo's medal under Emma's bed and hangs it in David's room.

When David returns home, Emma takes the medal, but he notices it. He questions her about it and Emma admits being on the cliff with Milo, but she lies about them playing a game and Milo let her wear the medal. Concerned about Emma's behavior, David consults a child psychiatrist that his sister recommends. Dr. March, after talking to and observing Emma, assures David that Emma is normal. Chloe later taunts Emma, saying she may become Emma's stepmother. That night, after David goes out for a date, Emma lures Chloe into the work-shed, locks it, and sets it on fire, killing Chloe. David rushes home and later confronts Emma, who eventually admits to murdering Milo, Mrs. Ellis, Chloe, and her previous babysitter.

The next day, David drives Emma to a lake house, intending to kill her and then himself. He drugs Emma's hot chocolate, but she switches the mugs, incapacitating him. He wakes up when she shoots at him with his gun. He chases her and Emma calls 911, screaming for help. The caretaker of the lake house arrives with his rifle to find David about to kill Emma, claiming she is evil. The caretaker fatally shoots David. As David's body is being removed, Emma sits in the back of a car hugging her aunt Angela. She stares into the camera with a cold, predatory look on her face.

== Cast ==
- Rob Lowe as David Grossman, Emma's father
- Mckenna Grace as Emma Grossman
- Sarah Dugdale as Chloe, Emma's new nanny.
- Marci T. House as Mrs. Ellis, Emma's teacher.
- Lorne Cardinal as Brian, the caretaker of the Grossmans' lake house.
- Chris Shields as Sheriff Peterson.
- Cara Buono as Angela Grossman, David's sister and Emma's paternal aunt who is a known psychiatrist.
- Patty McCormack as Dr. March, Emma's psychiatrist. McCormack received an Oscar nomination for playing the daughter in the 1956 film.
- Luke Roessler as Milo Curtis, Emma's classmate.
- Shauna Johannesen as Maggie Curtis, Milo's mother.
- Robert Egger as Mr. Curtis, Milo's father.
- John Emmet Tracy as Mark Wiggins.

== Production ==
A conventional remake by Barbara Marshal of The Bad Seed, had been in development hell between Lifetime and executive producer Mark Wolper. However, it never survived script stage, until late 2017, when Lifetime gave the green light on production. Warner Bros. Television owns the rights to the title. Actor-director Rob Lowe was also named as director and star of the 2018 release, with additional casting to follow. In February 2018, Mckenna Grace and Patty McCormack were announced as being cast.

== Reception ==
=== Critical reception ===
The Bad Seed received mixed reviews upon its release. David Feinberg of The Hollywood Reporter said: "Call it The Bad Seed and you tap into a surface-glaze legitimacy that's probably unwarranted, because the movie, notable as co-star Rob Lowe's directing debut, achieves only a baseline amount of trashy fun, nothing more or less." Andrea Reiher from the website Collider said the film "suffers from being neither dark enough nor campy enough—either choice would have been a lot more enjoyable. But it is stuck in a middle area that is devoid of over-the-top absurdity or any real darkness."

=== Ratings ===
Upon its initial broadcast on September 9, 2018, The Bad Seed was watched by 1.87 million viewers, placing it in the top ten most-watched cable programs on that date.

== Sequel ==
On November 12, 2021, Lifetime ordered a sequel to the film with Grace set to reprise her role as Emma. It was set to be premiered on May 30, 2022, but was premiered on September 5, 2022 due to production delays.

== See also ==
- List of programs broadcast by Lifetime
- The Bad Seed (1985 film) - An earlier remake of the 1956 film.
