= The Bad Seed (1956 film) =

1956 American film by Mervyn LeRoy

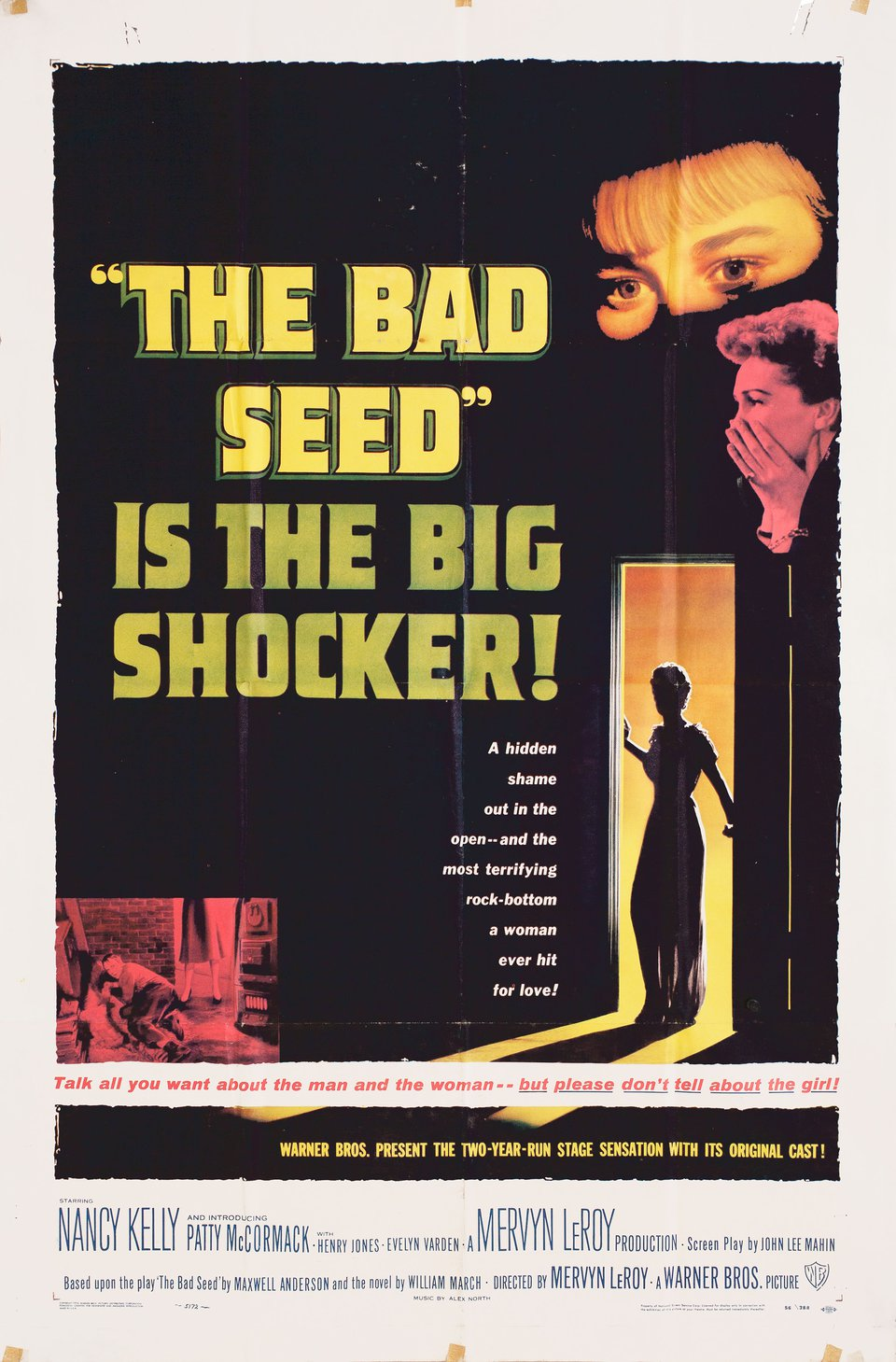
- Directed by: Mervyn LeRoy
- Screenplay by: John Lee Mahin
- Based on: The Bad Seed by Maxwell Anderson; The Bad Seed by William March
- Produced by: Mervyn LeRoy
- Starring: Nancy Kelly; Patty McCormack; Henry Jones; Evelyn Varden
- Cinematography: Harold Rosson
- Edited by: Warren Low
- Music by: Alex North
- Production company: Warner Bros.
- Distributed by: Warner Bros.
- Release date: September 12, 1956
- Running time: 129 minutes
- Country: United States
- Language: English
- Budget: $1 million
- Box office: $4.1 million (rentals)

The Bad Seed is a 1956 American psychological horror thriller film directed by Mervyn LeRoy and starring Nancy Kelly, Patty McCormack, Henry Jones and Eileen Heckart, about an eight-year-old girl whose mother begins to suspect that she might be a psychopathic killer.

The film adapts the 1954 play of the same name by Maxwell Anderson, which in turn is based on William March's 1954 novel of the same name. The screenplay was written by John Lee Mahin. Kelly, McCormack, and Heckart each garnered Academy Awards nominations for their performances, as well as Harold Rosson's cinematography.

== Plot ==
Kenneth and Christine Penmark dote on their eight-year-old daughter, Rhoda, pristine and proper in her pinafore dress and blonde pigtails. Kenneth leaves on military duty. Neighbor and landlady Monica Breedlove is fond of Rhoda. Rhoda tells her about a penmanship competition that she lost to her schoolmate Claude Daigle. Rhoda then leaves for her school picnic at a lake.

While lunching, Christine and friends hear a radio report that Claude has drowned in the lake. Christine worries that her daughter might be traumatized, but Rhoda is unfazed by the incident. Rhoda's teacher, Miss Fern, visits Christine, revealing that Rhoda was seen grabbing at Claude's penmanship medal and was with the boy just prior to his death. She hints that Rhoda might have some connection to Claude's death, adding that Rhoda will not be welcome at the school after the current term ends. Claude's parents barge in; Mrs. Daigle is distraught and drunk, accusing Miss Fern of withholding information. When Christine finds the medal hidden in the lining of Rhoda's jewel case, she demands an explanation. Rhoda tells her that she paid Claude fifty cents to wear it for the day and only kept it in the confusion after Claude's death.

During a visit from her father, journalist Richard Bravo, Christine confronts him about haunting and confusing memories of her own childhood. She tells him that she always suspected that she was adopted. Initially he denies it, but when Christine recalls details, he reluctantly confirms that she was adopted as a toddler. Christine is horrified to discern that she is the biological daughter of a notorious Australian serial killer. She worries that her origin is the genetic cause of Rhoda's sociopathy. Richard tries to convince her that it is nurture, not nature, that primarily influences such behavior.

Christine catches Rhoda trying to dispose of her tap shoes in the apartment incinerator. She realizes that Rhoda must have hit Claude with the shoes, which had left odd crescent-shaped marks on his face and hands that could not be identified. Alternately feigning tears and angrily blaming Claude, Rhoda admits that she killed the boy for his medal. Rhoda also confirms Christine's suspicion that, to acquire a keepsake, she had previously murdered an elderly neighbor when they had lived in Wichita, Kansas. Christine orders Rhoda to burn the shoes in the incinerator.

The next day, janitor Leroy Jessup, who has previously seen Rhoda's malice behind her demure pose, teasingly tells Rhoda that he believes she killed Claude. After Rhoda angrily tells him that she burned her shoes, Leroy opens the incinerator and finds the remains. A drunk Mrs. Daigle returns and tells Christine that she believes that Rhoda knows what happened to her son.

Realizing Leroy knows the truth, Rhoda sets his excelsior bedding ablaze and locks him in the basement. After men break open the basement hatch, Leroy runs into the yard aflame, ultimately burning to death. From the window, Christine and Monica see him die; Christine becomes hysterical. That night, a strangely calm Christine tells Rhoda that she dropped the penmanship medal into the lake where Claude's body was found, then gives her daughter a lethal dose of sleeping pills. Christine shoots herself in the head; however, the gunshot alerts the neighbors, and Rhoda and Christine are rushed to the hospital. They both survive, although Christine lingers in a coma. Kenneth arrives and takes Rhoda home.

At bedtime, Rhoda excitedly tells Kenneth that she will inherit Monica's pet lovebird. She mentions that she and Monica plan to sunbathe on the roof. When Kenneth tells her that lovebirds don't live as long as people, Rhoda becomes pensive about Monica's lifespan and her chances of getting the lovebird. Christine regains consciousness and is expected to make a full recovery. She calls Kenneth and tells him that she must pay for her "dreadful sin," but Kenneth assures her that they will work on their problems together.

At night, Rhoda sneaks away during a thunderstorm and attempts to retrieve the medal from the lake using a dip net. A sudden bolt of lightning strikes the dock—presumably killing Rhoda—in a cloud of smoke.

== Cast ==
- Nancy Kelly as Christine Penmark
- Patty McCormack as Rhoda Penmark
- Henry Jones as Leroy Jessup
- Eileen Heckart as Hortense Daigle
- Evelyn Varden as Monica Breedlove
- William Hopper as Colonel Kenneth Penmark
- Paul Fix as Richard Bravo
- Jesse White as Emory Wages
- Gage Clarke as Reginald "Reggie" Tasker
- Joan Croydon as Claudia Fern (credited as Joan Croyden)
- Frank Cady as Henry Daigle
- Don C. Harvey as Guard In Hospital Corridor (uncredited)

== Music ==
The soundtrack, composed by Alex North, was released by RCA Victor on vinyl upon the movie's release in 1956, however, it only included eleven songs. In 2011, those same songs were digitally released and it was not until 2017 that La-La Land Records, Columbia Records and Sony Music put out all sixteen songs on CD for the first time. Excluded from the soundtrack, in multiple scenes Rhoda plays Au clair de la lune, a French folk song, on the piano.

== Production ==
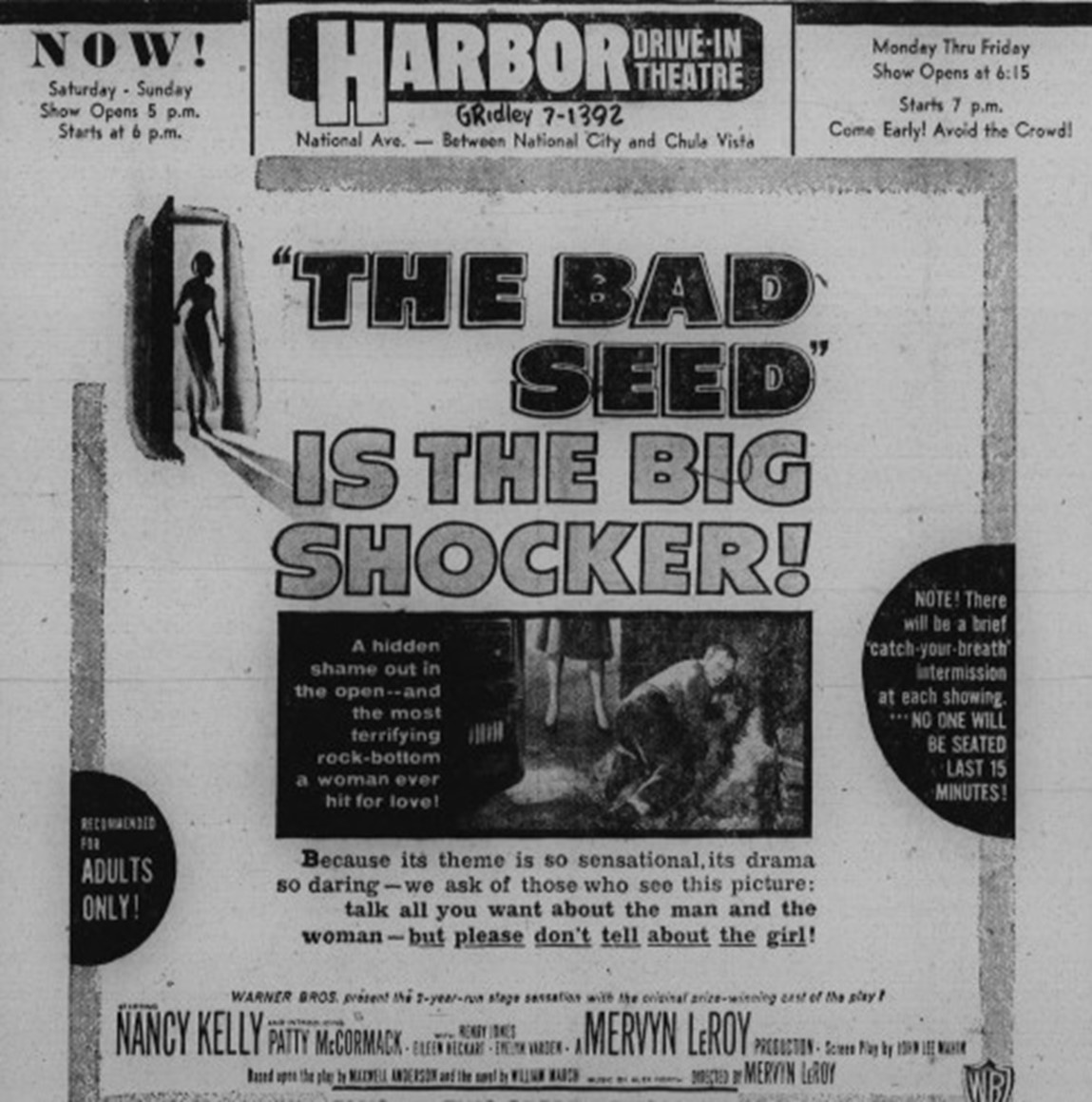
Drive-in advertisement from 1956

After the success of the book, Geoffrey Shurlock of the Production Code Administration (PCA) sent a letter to Jack Warner stating that "the property violated the spirit and letter of the Code." Shurlock's office wrote to Paramount Pictures, Columbia Pictures and Universal Pictures to caution them against the property. Although the studios had not yet formally inquired about it, Buddy Adler, Frank McCarthy and Dore Schary were interested in producing the film. After a bidding war, Warner purchased the film rights for $300,000 (equivalent to $3,000,000 in 2021). United States Pictures stated that it would only produce the film for Warner Bros. Pictures upon approval by the PCA. Adler contacted Shurlock demanding to know why approval had been given. Shurlock responded that director Mervyn LeRoy had devised a treatment "that seemed to do what the office thought was impossible."

Although the novel and play conclude with Christine dying and Rhoda surviving, the Motion Picture Production Code did not permit perpetrators of crime to remain unpunished. The film's ending thus reverses the deaths of the mother and daughter, with Christine's life saved and Rhoda killed by a bolt of lightning. In another move to appease the censors, Warner Bros. added an "adults only" warning to the film's advertising. The film softens the shocking ending with a segment in which an announcer introduces the members of the cast. It concludes with Kelly lightheartedly spanking McCormack for her character's misdeeds. However, Le Roy claims that the ending was not forced by the Motion Picture Production Code and that it was done on his own accord, as he felt as though it was more appropriate.

== Reception ==
The Bad Seed was one of the larger hits of 1956 for Warner Bros., earning the company $4.1 million in theatrical rentals in the U.S. against a $1 million budget. The film finished among the year's top 20 at the box office in the United States and among the ten most popular box-office draws in Britain in 1956.

The film received favorable reviews from critics, and review aggregator Rotten Tomatoes reports an approval rating of 66% based on 29 reviews, with a rating average of 7.1/10.

== Accolades ==
Award	Category	Nominee(s)	Result	Ref.
Academy Awards	Best Actress	Nancy Kelly	Nominated	
Academy Awards	Best Supporting Actress	Eileen Heckart	Nominated	
Academy Awards	Best Supporting Actress	Patty McCormack	Nominated	
Academy Awards	Best Cinematography	Harold Rosson	Nominated	
Golden Globe Awards	Best Supporting Actress – Motion Picture	Eileen Heckart	Won	
Golden Globe Awards	Best Supporting Actress – Motion Picture	Patty McCormack	Nominated	

=== Other honors ===
The film is recognized by American Film Institute in these lists:

- 2001: AFI's 100 Years...100 Thrills – Nominated

== Influence and legacy ==
McCormack starred in the 1995 low-budget film Mommy as a psychopathic mother and in House of Deadly Secrets in 2018. Some consider both films as unofficial sequels to The Bad Seed.

The first act of the 1992 off-Broadway musical Ruthless! is inspired by the film.

The 1993 film The Good Son is partly inspired by The Bad Seed.

Steven Kampmann conceived 1994's Clifford as a comedy version of The Bad Seed.

In 2024, Paste listed Rhoda 3rd among "the best portrayals of cinematic sociopaths", in 2011 Slate called Rhoda "the perfect psychopath", and Psychology Today in 2023 wrote that the novel on which the movie is based "exposed the risk of psychopathy in children".

== Remakes ==
The Bad Seed was remade for television in 1985, adapted by George Eckstein, directed by Paul Wendkos and starring Carrie Welles, Blair Brown, Lynn Redgrave, David Carradine, Richard Kiley and Chad Allen. The remake employs the original ending of the March novel and its stage production but was panned by critics and poorly received by its television audience.

In June 2015, it was announced that Lifetime would produce a remake. In December 2017, Deadline reported that Rob Lowe was to direct and star in the remake with Mckenna Grace, Sarah Dugdale, Marci T. House, Lorne Cardinal, Chris Shields, Cara Buono, and a special appearance by McCormack as Dr. March. The film aired in September 2018.

Four years later in September 2022, a sequel to the Lifetime TV movie, titled The Bad Seed Returns, aired. It again featured Mckenna Grace as Emma and Patty McCormack as Emma's therapist, Dr. March.

== See also ==
- List of films featuring psychopaths and sociopaths
- List of American films of 1956
