= Mickey Spillane =

American crime novelist (1918–2006)

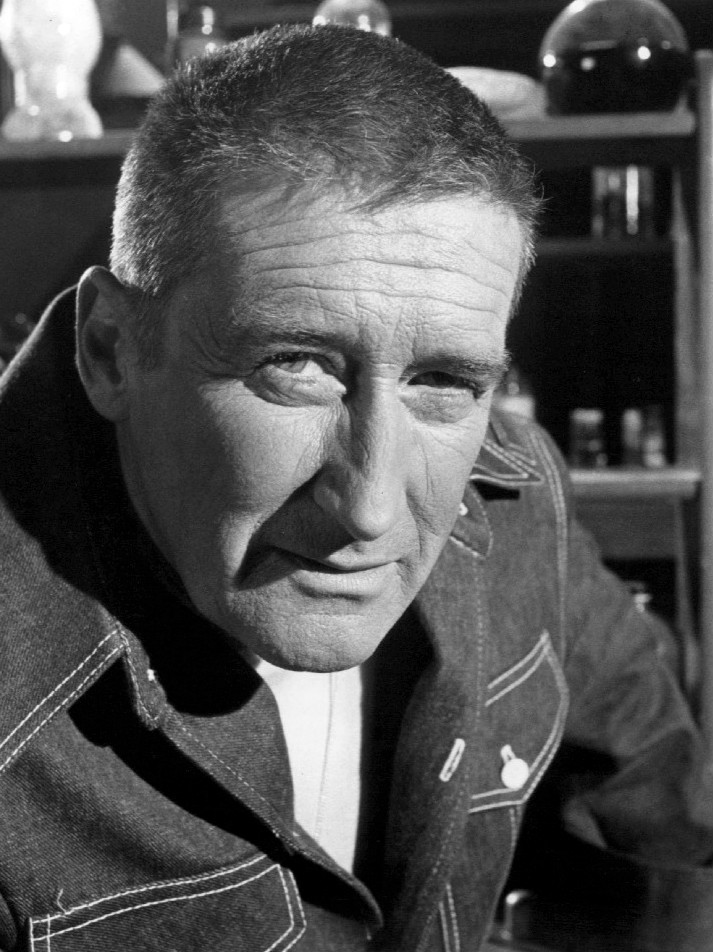
- Spillane in the "Publish or Perish" episode of Columbo in 1974
- Born: Frank Morrison Spillane; March 9, 1918; Brooklyn, New York, U.S.
- Died: July 17, 2006 (aged 88); Murrells Inlet, South Carolina, U.S.
- Occupations: Novelist; actor
- Spouse(s): Mary Ann Pearce (1945–1963), Sherri Malinou (1965–1983), Jane Rogers Johnson (1983)
- Writing career
- Period: 1947–2006
- Genres: Hardboiled crime fiction, detective fiction
- Notable awards: Inkpot Award (1994)

Frank Morrison Spillane (/spɪˈleɪn/; March 9, 1918 – July 17, 2006), better known as Mickey Spillane, was an American crime novelist, called the "king of pulp fiction". He was best known for stories featuring his signature detective character, Mike Hammer.

Spillane's total sales rank him among the most successful fiction authors of the modern era, with industry estimates exceeding 200 million copies of his 26 books sold. Spillane was also an occasional actor, once even playing Hammer himself in the 1963 film The Girl Hunters.

== Early life ==
Frank Morrison Spillane was born in Brooklyn, New York, and primarily raised in Elizabeth, New Jersey. He was the only child of his Irish bartender father, John Joseph Spillane, and his Scottish mother, Catherine Anne. During his late adolescence, his family returned to Brooklyn, where he graduated from Erasmus Hall High School in 1936. He started writing while in high school, briefly attended Fort Hays State College in Kansas, and worked a variety of jobs, including summers as a lifeguard at Breezy Point, Queens, and a period as a trampoline artist for the Ringling Bros. and Barnum & Bailey Circus.

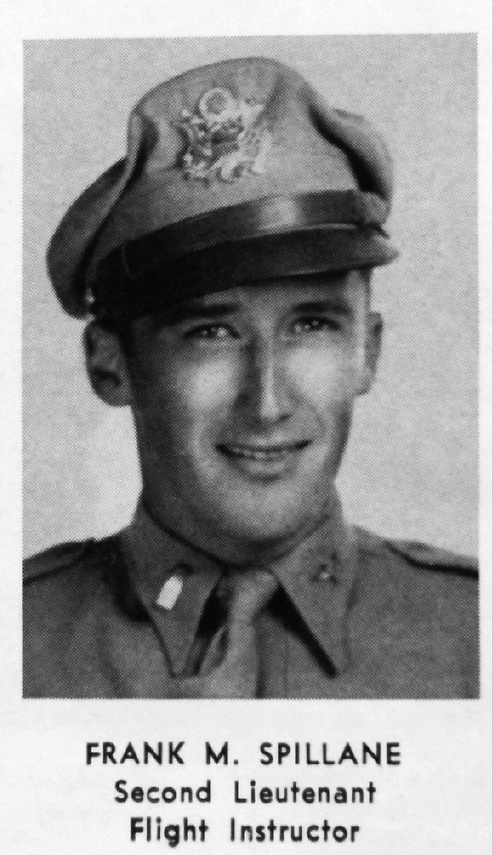
Photo of Spillane from Greenwood Army Air Field yearbook for 1943

During World War II, Spillane enlisted in the Army Air Corps, becoming a fighter pilot and a flight instructor. He was first stationed at the air base in Greenwood, Mississippi, where he met and married first wife Mary Ann Pearce in 1945. He also met two younger writers, Earle Basinsky and Charlie Wells, who would become his protégés; each published two hardboiled-noir novels in the Spillane style in the early 1950s.

== Career ==
=== Comic books ===
Spillane claims that he started being published as an author of higher-quality magazines known as "slicks" where he was credited under house names, then went "lower" to the pulps, then went lower still as a writer for comic books. While working as a salesman in Gimbels department store basement in 1940, he met tie salesman Joe Gill, who later found a lifetime career in scripting for Charlton Comics. Gill told Spillane to meet his brother, Ray Gill, who wrote for Funnies Inc., an outfit that packaged comic books for different publishers.

Spillane soon began writing an eight-page story every day. He concocted adventures for major 1940s comic book characters, including Captain Marvel, Superman, Batman, and Captain America. In the early 1940s, working for Funnies, Inc., he wrote two-page text stories which were syndicated to various comic book publishers, including Timely Comics. At one point, Spillane estimated he wrote fifty of these "short-short stories," which were intended to fulfill a postal regulation requiring comic books to have at least two pages of text to qualify for a second-class mailing permit.

While most comic books writers toiled anonymously, Spillane's byline appeared on most of his prose "filler" stories. Twenty-six stories were collected in Primal Spillane: Early Stories 1941–1942 (Gryphon Books, 2003). A new, expanded edition of Primal Spillane was released by Bold Venture Press in 2018, the new volume contained an additional fifteen stories, including the previously unpublished "A Turn of the Tide".

=== Novels ===
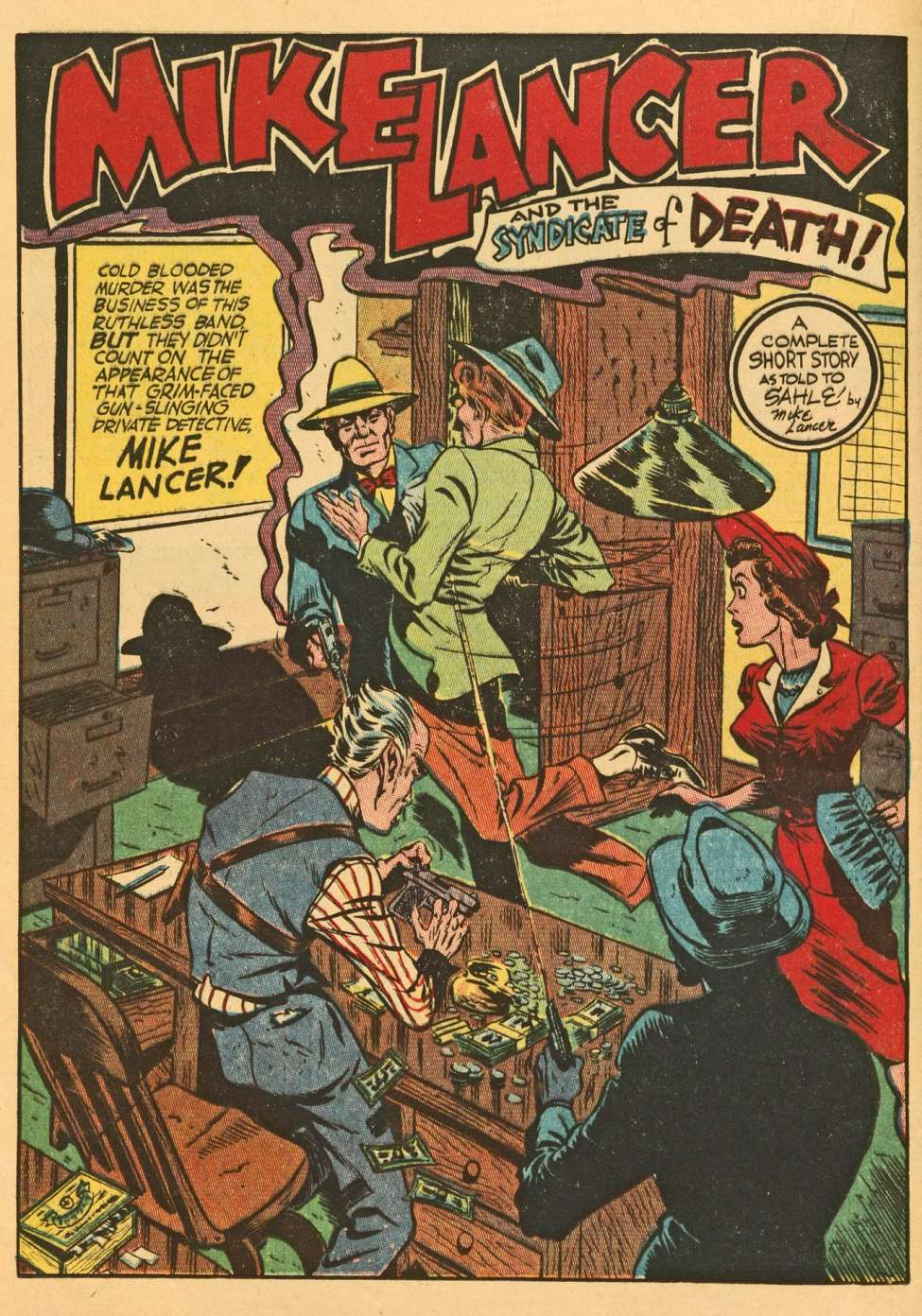
Mike Lancer in Green Hornet Comics #10 (December 1942); art by Harry Sahle

Spillane joined the United States Army Air Corps on December 8, 1941, the day after the attack on Pearl Harbor. In the mid-1940s he was stationed as a flight instructor in Greenwood, Mississippi, where he met and married Mary Ann Pearce in 1945. The couple wanted to buy a country house in the town of Newburgh, New York, 60 miles north of New York City, so Spillane decided to boost his bank account by writing a novel. He wrote I, the Jury in just 9 days. At the suggestion of Ray Gill, he sent it to E. P. Dutton.

With the combined total of the 1947 hardcover and the Signet paperback (December 1948), I, the Jury sold 6-1/2 million copies in the United States alone. I, the Jury introduced Spillane's most famous character, hardboiled detective Mike Hammer. His novels featured more sex than competing titles, and the violence was more overt than the usual detective story. Covers tended to feature scantily dressed women or women who appeared as if they were about to undress. In the beginning, Mike Hammer's chief nemeses consisted of gangsters, but by the early '50s, this broadened to communists and deviants.

In December 1942 an early version of Spillane's Mike Hammer character, called Mike Lancer, appeared in Harvey Comics' Green Hornet Comics #10. In 1946, Spillane submitted in a script for a detective-themed comic book. "Mike Hammer originally started out to be a comic book. I was gonna have a Mike Danger comic book," Spillane said in a 1984 interview. Two Mike Danger comic-book stories were published in 1954 without Spillane's knowledge. These were published with other material in "Byline: Mickey Spillane," edited by Max Allan Collins and Lynn F. Myers Jr. (Crippen & Landru publishers, 2004).

The Mike Hammer series proved hugely successful during the 1950s and 1960s, but the books were excoriated by the literary establishment. Malcolm Cowley of The New Republic called Spillane "a dangerous paranoid, sadist, and masochist", and even his own editors sometimes found his novels distasteful. Spillane for his part was unmoved by critics, saying "You can sell a lot more peanuts than caviar" and "The literary world is made of second rate writers writing about other second rate writers." Attractively low prices (25 cents for a paperback copy, later raised to 50 cents) helped sales, and the 1956 informative guide Sixty Years of Best Sellers found that the six novels Spillane had written up to that point were among the top ten best selling American fiction titles of all time.

The Signet paperbacks displayed dramatic front cover illustrations. Lu Kimmel created the cover paintings for My Gun Is Quick, Vengeance Is Mine, One Lonely Night, and The Long Wait. The cover art for Kiss Me, Deadly was by James Meese.

=== Acting ===
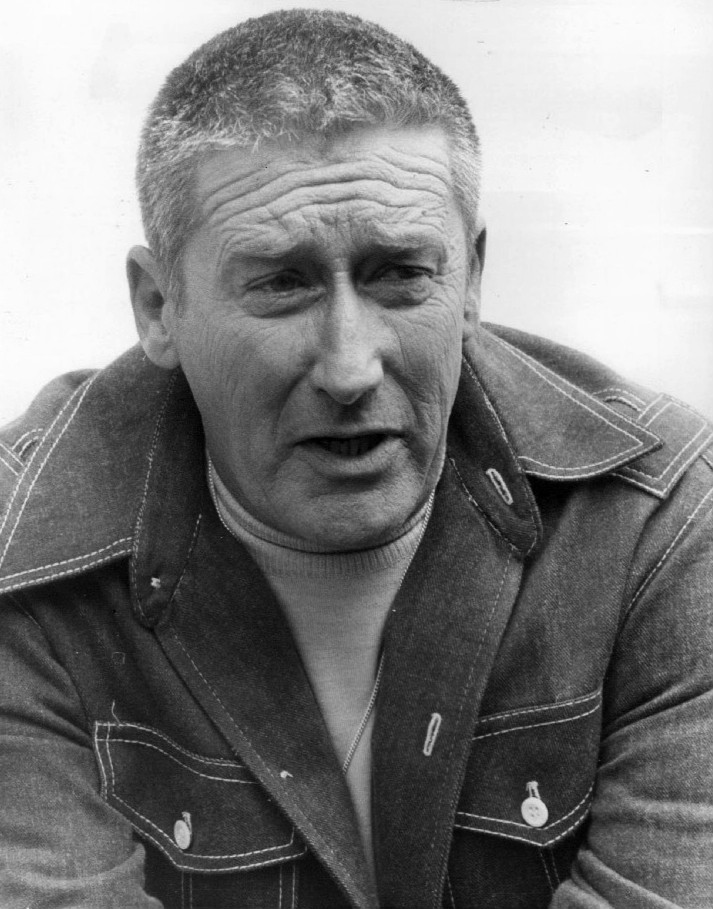
Spillane in the 1974 Columbo episode "Publish or Perish"

Spillane portrayed himself as a detective in Ring of Fear (1954), and rewrote the film without credit for John Wayne's and Robert Fellows's Wayne-Fellows Productions. The film was directed by screenwriter James Edward Grant. Several Hammer novels were made into movies, including Kiss Me Deadly (1955). In The Girl Hunters (1963) filmed in England, Spillane himself appeared as Hammer, one of the few occasions in film history in which an author of a popular literary hero has portrayed his own character. Spillane was scheduled to film The Snake as a follow-up, but the film was never made.

On October 25, 1956, Spillane appeared on The Ford Show, Starring Tennessee Ernie Ford, with interest on his Mike Hammer novels. In January 1974, he appeared with Jack Cassidy in the television series Columbo starring Peter Falk in the episode "Publish or Perish". He portrayed a writer who is murdered. In 1995 and 1997, he appeared in the low budget films Mommy and its sequel, Mommy 2: Mommy's Day, directed by his frequent collaborator Max Allan Collins.

In 1969, Spillane formed a production company with Robert Fellows who had produced The Girl Hunters to produce many of his books, but Fellows died soon after and only The Delta Factor was produced.

During the 1980s, he appeared in Miller Lite beer commercials. In the 1990s, Spillane licensed one of his characters to Tekno Comix for use in a science-fiction adventure series, Mike Danger. In his introduction to the series, Spillane said he had conceived of the character decades earlier but never used him.

== Personal life ==
In 1945, Mickey met and married Mary Ann Pearce. They had four children, Caroline, Kathy, Michael, and Ward. Their marriage ended in 1962.

In November 1965, he married his second wife, nightclub singer Sherri Malinou. The marriage ended in divorce (and a lawsuit) in 1983.

In October 1983, Spillane married Jane Rogers Johnson, his final wife. He shared his waterfront house in Murrells Inlet, South Carolina, with her and her two daughters, Jennifer and Margaret Johnson.

In the 1960s, Spillane became a friend of the novelist Ayn Rand. Despite their apparent differences, Rand admired Spillane's literary style, and Spillane became, as he described it, a "fan" of Rand's work. Later in his life, Spillane became an active Jehovah's Witness.

In 1989, Hurricane Hugo ravaged his Murrells Inlet house to such a degree it had to be almost entirely reconstructed. A television interview showed Spillane standing in the ruins of his house.

== Death ==
Spillane died on July 17, 2006, at his home in Murrells Inlet, of pancreatic cancer. After his death, his friend and literary executor, Max Allan Collins, began editing and completing Spillane's unpublished typescripts, beginning with a non-series novel, Dead Street (2007).

== Reception and legacy ==
Early reaction to Spillane's work was generally hostile from other authors and professional critics. Malcolm Cowley dismissed the Mike Hammer character as "a homicidal paranoiac". John G. Cawelti called Spillane's writing "atrocious", and Julian Symons called Spillane's work "nauseating".

In recent decades, Spillane's work has been praised for its influence by Max Allan Collins, William L. DeAndrea, and Robert L. Gale. DeAndrea argued that although Spillane's characters were stereotypes, Spillane had a "flair for fast-action writing", that his work broke new ground for American crime fiction, and that Spillane's prose "is lean and spare and authentically tough, something that writers like Raymond Chandler and Ross Macdonald never achieved."

German painter Markus Lüpertz said Spillane's writing influenced his own work, saying that Spillane ranks as one of the major poets of the 20th century. American comic book writer Frank Miller has mentioned Spillane as an influence for his own hardboiled style. Avant-Garde musician John Zorn composed a piece influenced by Spillane's writing titled Spillane.

In July 2011, the community of Murrells Inlet named U.S. 17 Business the "Mickey Spillane Waterfront 17 Highway". The proposal first passed the Georgetown County Council in 2006 while Spillane was still alive, but the South Carolina General Assembly rejected the plan.

== Awards and accolades ==
In 1983, Spillane received the lifetime achievement award from the Private Eye Writers of America. He received an Edgar Allan Poe Grand Master Award in 1995.

== Novels ==
=== Mike Hammer ===
- 1947 I, the Jury
- 1950 My Gun Is Quick
- 1950 Vengeance Is Mine
- 1951 One Lonely Night
- 1951 The Big Kill
- 1952 Kiss Me, Deadly
- 1962 The Girl Hunters
- 1964 The Snake
- 1966 The Twisted Thing
- 1967 The Body Lovers
- 1970 Survival... Zero!
- 1989 The Killing Man
- 1996 Black Alley

=== Tiger Mann ===
- 1964 Day of the Guns
- 1965 Bloody Sunrise
- 1965 The Death Dealers
- 1966 The By-Pass Control

=== Morgan the Raider ===
- 1967 The Delta Factor
- 2011 The Consummata – completed by Max Allan Collins

=== Other novels ===
- 1951 The Long Wait
- 1959 Me, Hood A complete novelette printed in the July 1959 Cavalier magazine
- 1961 The Deep
- 1964 Return of the Hood
- 1964 The Flier
- 1965 Killer Mine
- 1965 Man Alone
- 1972 The Erection Set – a Dogeron Kelly novel; in the Jacqueline Susann mould
- 1973 The Last Cop Out
- 1979 The Day The Sea Rolled Back – young adult
- 1982 The Ship That Never Was – young adult
- 1984 Tomorrow I Die – collection of short stories
- 2001 Together We Kill: The Uncollected Stories of Mickey Spillane – collection of short stories
- 2003 Something's Down There – featuring semi-retired spy Mako Hooker
- 2007 Dead Street – completed by Max Allan Collins and featuring retired NYPD Captain Jack Stang, the name of a policeman friend of Spillane's
- 2015 The Legend of Caleb York – novelisation by Max Allan Collins (Based on an un-produced movie script by Mickey Spillane)

=== Short stories ===
- 1989 The Killing Man – Mike Hammer short story later turned into a full-length Mike Hammer novel published in Playboy magazine December 1989, later republished in the book Byline: Mickey Spillane in 2004 (Crippen & Landru)
- 1996 Black Alley – Mike Hammer short story later turned into a full-length Mike Hammer novel published in Playboy magazine December 1996, later republished in the book Byline: Mickey Spillane in 2004 (Crippen & Landru)
- 1998 The Night I Died – Mike Hammer short story published in the anthology Private Eyes – although story was written in 1953, was not published until 1998
- 2003 Primal Spillane: Early Stories 1941–1942 – With an introduction by Collins and Lynn F. Myers Jr. – published by Gryphon Books.
- 2004 The Duke Alexander – Mike Hammer short story published in the book Byline: Mickey Spillane first published in 2004 (Crippen & Landru), although it was originally written circa 1956
- 2008 The Big Switch – Mike Hammer short story; completed by Max Allan Collins – published in The Strand Magazine, reprinted in paperback in The Mammoth Book of the World's Best Crime Stories, 2009
- 2009 I'll Die Tomorrow – (illustrated, limited edition of the short story, posthumous with Collins)
- 2010 A Long Time Dead – Mike Hammer short story; completed by Collins – published in The Strand Magazine
- 2010 Grave Matter – Mike Hammer short story; completed by Collins – published in Crimes By Moonlight, ed. Charlaine Harris
- 2012 Skin – Mike Hammer e-book short story; completed by Collins
- 2013 So Long, Chief – Mike Hammer short story; completed by Collins – published in The Strand Magazine, Issue XXXIX, Feb. – May 2013
- 2014 It's In The Book – Mike Hammer e-book short story; completed by Collins
- 2015 Fallout – Mike Hammer short story; completed by Collins – published in The Strand Magazine
- 2016 A Dangerous Cat – Mike Hammer short story; completed by Collins – published in The Strand Magazine, Issue XLVIII, Feb. – May 2016
- 2016 A Long Time Dead: A Mike Hammer Casebook – a collection of short stories by Mickey Spillane and Collins – published by Mysteriouspress.com/Open Road (collection reprints the stories The Big Switch, A Long Time Dead, Grave Matter, So Long, Chief, Fallout, A Dangerous Cat, Skin (first time in print format), and It's In The Book (first time in print format))
- 2018 A Turn of the Tide — although written circa 1950, it was not published until 2018 in the expanded and revised edition of Primal Spillane by Bold Venture Press.
- 2018 Tonight My Love – Mike Hammer short story; developed by Collins – published in The Strand Magazine, Issue LVI, Oct. 2018 – Jan. 2019 – story developed from a Mickey Spillane radio-style playlet that was part of a Mike Hammer jazz LP (Mickey Spillane's Mike Hammer Story) produced in 1954 by Mickey Spillane. This is the story of how Mike Hammer met Velda.

== See also ==
- History of crime fiction
- Hard boiled American crime fiction writing
- List of Mickey Spillane's Mike Hammer (1958 TV series) episodes
