= Mommy 2: Mommy's Day =

- Directed by: Max Allan Collins
- Written by: Max Allan Collins
- Produced by: Steven Henke
- Starring: Patty McCormack; Sarah Jane Miller; Rachel Lemieux; Paul Petersen; Gary Sandy; Brinke Stevens; Michael Cornelison; Mickey Spillane; Arlen Dean Snyder
- Cinematography: Phillip W. Dingeldein
- Edited by: Phillip W. Dingeldein
- Music by: Richard Lowry
- Distributed by: M.A.C. Productions
- Release date: August 4, 1997
- Running time: 87 minutes
- Country: United States
- Language: English

Mommy 2: Mommy's Day (also known as just Mommy's Day) is a 1997 low budget sequel to the 1995 thriller Mommy starring Patty McCormack once again as the psychotically obsessed mother who is trying to reunite with her daughter.

== Plot ==
The film picks up several months after its predecessor with Mrs. Sterling (Patty McCormack) on Death Row about to be executed via lethal injection for the murders she committed that film. Her daughter Jessica Ann (Rachel Lemieux), as well as her sister Beth (Brinke Stevens), Jessica's aunt, her attorney (Mickey Spillane) also come to witness the execution along with Lt. March. Mrs. Sterling is granted her last rites in a closed room, but manages to incapacitate her imprisoners and escape, holding one of them hostage before she is shot and wounded by Lt. March. As he prepares to shoot to kill, Lt. March has a stroke and collapses on the spot.

A year later, Mrs. Sterling's psychiatrist, Dr. Price, makes a deal with the police and prosecutors, she can forego her execution if she agrees to have a small device that secretes anti-psychotic medication constantly surgically implanted in her hand. After agreeing to the procedure, Mrs. Sterling is assigned to a halfway house where her daughter's former principal, Mrs. Evans, tells her that she will be watching her closely and would like nothing better than to see her back on Death Row.

Meanwhile, Beth has married Paul Conway, a successful author of true crime books including his latest publication "The Mommy Murders" which is based on the events that occurred in the first film. Beth and Paul are the legal guardians of Jessica Ann, whom the courts have temporarily blocked from contacting her mother (and vice versa) with a restraining order. While on the Paula Sands live show to promote his book, Paul gets into an argument with Jolene Jones (the twin sister of the janitor who was murdered by Mrs. Sterling in the previous film). Jolene later visits Paul at home, eager for them to co-write a follow-up book to the Mommy Murders, and thus get a share of the profits. Paul initially rejects Jolene's offer, saying she has nothing of value to offer him.

Mrs. Sterling is desperate to get in contact with Jessica Ann again and visits the local skating rink where her daughter has been taking lessons and is in practice for her first competition. After briefly reuniting with Jessica Ann, Mrs. Sterling is warned away by the skating coach who threatens to report her to the police if she breaches the restraining order again. Later that night, an unseen assailant bludgeons the skating instructor to death with a skate. Mrs. Sterling is assumed by most to be the murderer, based on her past history and witnesses who saw her argue with Jessica's skating coach; both Jessica Ann and Dr Price argue against this assumption, however, explaining that it doesn't fit Mrs. Sterling's modus operandi.

Mrs. Sterling later tries to talk to Jessica Ann at her school but is warned away by a teacher. Sgt Anderson, who was Lt March's partner, later meets with Mrs. Sterling, making it clear he knows she has attempted to breach the restraining order and holds her responsible for his partner's stroke. Keen to prove her innocence, Mrs. Sterling appears on the Paula Sands show with assurance by the show's producer, Jerry, that things will go fine. But unbeknownst to her, she is verbally scolded by audience members during a Q&A segment and soon, Jolene reappears on the show to confront her for the murder of her sister. During a commercial break, Mrs. Sterling briefly threatens Jolene and Jerry. Later, Jerry has a stage light dropped on him and his eyes hacked out with a stiletto heel.

Jolene meets with Paul wanting a share of the profits for a potential book sequel based on the new spree of murders, he rejects her. After making calls to other authors, Jolene is electrocuted with a portable radio while taking a shower in her home. As the evidence starts to mount against Mrs. Sterling, she tries to persuade Beth and Paul to help her, but both remain skeptical. Awaking the next morning, Beth finds that Jessica Ann is missing and assumes her sister has taken her. Mrs. Sterling eavesdrops on a phone conversation between Paul and Jessica Ann's abductor, a young woman who closely resembles her, and realizes that he has been organizing the murders in order to frame her and write a sequel to make more money. After ripping out the implant from her hand, Mrs. Sterling regains her killing impulse urges and confronts Paul who threatens to shoot her before killing him in self-defense by pushing his head into a computer monitor and electrocuting him.

Jessica Ann awakens in a car near a riverside mill and runs off to escape her abductor. Mrs. Sterling tracks them both down, leading to a confrontation with her abductor After mocking her attempts at imitation, Mrs. Sterling shoots her dead, but not before the impostor has thrown a knife at her, wounding her chest. Reunited with Jessica Ann, Mrs. Sterling finally prepares to leave the whole incident behind her. Sometime later, Mrs. Sterling meets with Sgt. Anderson who reveals that the abductor was a woman named Glenna Cole whom Paul had met while researching his previous book. While Cole is responsible for all the deaths, that of Jolene Jones matched Mrs. Sterling's MO precisely that even Dr. Price had to admit to him. Unable to prove anything either way, he suggests that only Jolene knows for sure who killed her.

In the final scene, Mrs. Sterling watches proudly as Jessica Ann is awarded first prize in the skating competition while Beth sits next to her. Suspecting the judges would have awarded an Asian girl to be politically correct, Mrs. Sterling tells Beth the judges are 'lucky they did the right thing' with a brief stern look (a callback to the opening scene in the first movie when Mrs. Sterling confronts and kills Jessica Ann's teacher who gives a best student award to a Mexican boy as he is a person of color). Beth then gives a somewhat sinister gaze at her sister, knowing what she's capable of doing if things don't go her way.

== Production ==
Most of the cast from the first film returned for the sequel, including Sarah Jane Miller who plays the twin sister of her original character. Michael Cornelison also plays a different role, as the supervising psychiatrist. Jason Miller, was unwilling to reprise his role due to a smaller salary compared to the first, so his character was briefly played by Arlen Dean Snyder before being incapacitated by a stroke during the breakout scene.

As with the original, all of the film was shot in Iowa, specifically in the towns of Muscatine, Davenport and Bettendorf. Rachel Lemieux's character was written as an ice skating student as the actress had become interested in the sport by the time the sequel was filmed- her real life coach, Mark Cockrell, is featured in a small role as himself.

The talk show "Paula Sands Live" was a real television show which began in 1993 and aired in Iowa on KWQC-TV6 (the same network which appears in on a memo header in the film). In reality, the series followed a more traditional morning show type of format, not the sensationalistic 'Ricki Lake'-like program that is portrayed in the film.

Mommy 2 was initially released to cable in 1997 but, unlike its predecessor, was unable to recoup its initial investment. It later was released on DVD and then in 2020, in a 25th Anniversary double-Blu-ray/DVD package with the first Mommy film. In the audio commentary featured on the blu-ray, Max Allan Collins explains that the final shot of Brinke Stevens looking disturbed was supposed to lay the groundwork for a third film in which she would take centre-stage as a psychotic character and that, in a reversal of roles, it would be 'Mommy' who would be trying to save her. The third film never came to pass due to the lack of critical and commercial success of the second.

Many of the cast- Rachel Lemieux, Michael Cornelison, Brinke Stevens in particular- would later reunite and work with Max Allan Collins on his 2001 production Real Time: Siege at Lucas Street Market.

== Cast ==
- Patty McCormack as Mommy / Mrs. Sterling
- Sarah Jane Miller as Jolene Jones
- Rachel Lemieux as Jessica Ann
- Paul Petersen as Paul Conway
- Gary Sandy as Sergeant Anderson
- Brinke Stevens as Beth Conway
- Mickey Spillane as Attorney Neal Ekhardt
- Arlen Dean Snyder as Lieutenant March
- Michael Cornelison as Dr. Price
- Todd Eastland as Jerry
- Paula Sands]] as Herself
- Del Close as The Warden
- Laurence Coven as Dr. Stern
- Marian Wald as Mrs. Evans
- Pamela Cecil as Glenna Cole
- Mark Cockrell as Skating Instructor
