= The Bee Family =

Canadian internet personalities

YouTube information
- Channel: The Bee Family
- Years active: 2013–present
- Genre: Vlogs
- Subscribers: 10.3 million
- Views: 3.33 billion
- Last updated: 23 March 2026

The Bee Family (formerly the Eh Bee Family) are Canadian internet personalities best known for their social media channels, which have over 33 million combined subscribers and well over 6 billion total views. They create skits and parodies to entertain a family-centered audience. They are a family of four members consisting of the father (Andrés Burgos, known as Papa Bee; born in November 25, 1977 (age 48)), the mother (Rossana Burgos, known as Mama Bee; born in October 2, 1979 (age 47)), their son (Roberto Burgos, known as Mr Bee; born April 30, 2005 (age 21)), and their daughter (Gabriela Rossana Burgos, also known as Gabriela Bee or Miss Bee; born on September 9, 2006 (age 20)).

== Career ==
The Bee Family first started posting vines in January 2013. They became popular on Vine and made it their career. Their social media accounts include Vine, YouTube, Instagram, and Facebook. They have also starred in sponsored advertisements for such companies as Johnson & Johnson, Toyota, and Regal Cinemas and have also been featured in the New York Daily News, on BuzzFeed, Good Morning America, Today.com, and other media outlets. The family's social media was nominated for a Streamy Award in 2015 and a Shorty Award in 2016.

On July 15, 2020, the family changed their name from the "Eh Bee Family" to "The Bee Family".

=== Gabriela Bee ===
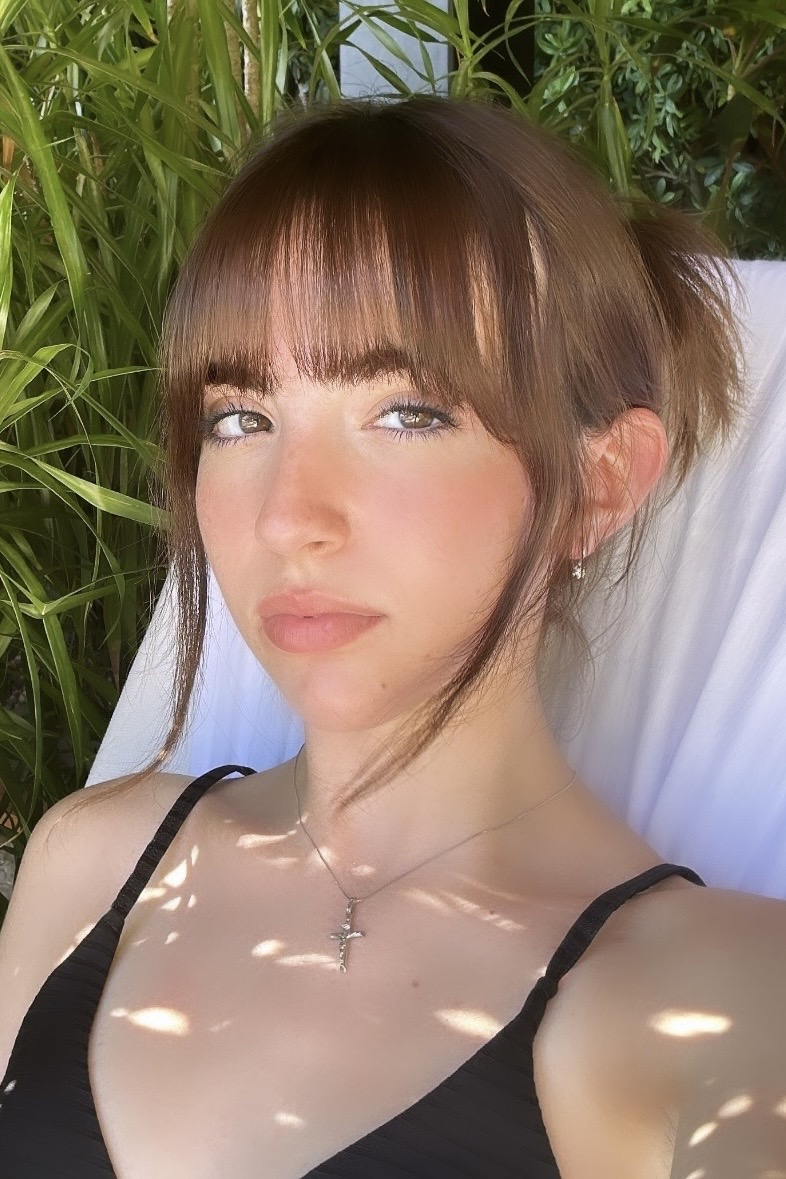
Gabriela Bee (Miss Bee)

On February 17, 2018, Gabriela Bee released her song "Sound in Color". On September 1, 2018, she released another song, "Something More". In April 2019, she posted a cover version of the Beatles’ 1968 hit song "Ob-La-Di, Ob-La-Da" on YouTube, appearing in the video as seven different musicians and performing all of the vocals herself. By January 2024, the song had earned more than 42 million views. Also in 2019, Bee released a cover version of Panic! at the Disco's High Hopes, accompanied by the band Walk off the Earth, which had racked up nearly 20 million views as of August 2023. Brendon Urie, the lead singer of Panic! at the Disco, did a video where he reacted to Bee's cover of his song.

Gabriela Bee made her film debut in the 2022 horror drama film, The Bad Seed Returns, in the supporting role of "Lola", Emma's classmate and friend.

In 2023, Gabriela first charted in the UK as the credited singer on the London-based rapper Prinz's single "Highs And Lows", a song which featured a sample of Bee's cover of the Walk Off The Earth track "I’ll Be There" from 2019. On October 6, 2023, Gabriela Bee released a song that she wrote, "Look at You Now", dedicated to her younger self. On 1 December the same year, she released another song that she wrote, "Maybe", dedicated to her best friend.

As of 2026, she has been focused on her music, releasing the album Stories in 2025 and the EP Cool in 2026. She also opened for Sadie Jean's North American Tour in 2026.
