= The Young Runaways (1968 film) =

1968 film by Arthur Dreifuss

- Directed by: Arthur Dreifuss
- Written by: Orville H. Hampton
- Produced by: Sam Katzman
- Starring: Brooke Bundy; Kevin Coughlin; Lloyd Bochner; Patty McCormack
- Cinematography: John F. Warren
- Edited by: Ben Lewis
- Music by: Fred Karger
- Production company: Four-Leaf Productions
- Distributed by: Metro-Goldwyn-Mayer
- Release date: September 11, 1968
- Running time: 91 minutes
- Country: United States
- Language: English

The Young Runaways is a 1968 American drama film directed by Arthur Dreifuss and starring Brooke Bundy, Kevin Coughlin and Patty McCormack. The supporting players are Lloyd Bochner, Dick Sargent, and in one of his early roles, Richard Dreyfuss, who has a small part as Terry, a juvenile delinquent.

It was McCormack's comeback film.

== Plot ==
The film begins with Shelley Morrison (Brooke Bundy) packing to run away from home because she feels she is not loved by her widowed father (Lloyd Bochner). She tells their maid (Isabel Sanford) that to her father she is not his daughter, but a product. She has overheard him telling columnist Army Archerd that he is testing some of his psychological theories about teenagers on his own daughter.

Shelley catches a ride with an older man. He gets sexually aggressive with her, and they have an accident when he loses control of the car. She escapes without her suitcase and winds up in Chicago. She meets a prostitute named Joanne in a diner, who claims to be a model. Joanne offers Shelley a place to stay, with the ulterior motive of turning Shelley into a working girl.

Kevin Coughlin plays Dewey, who runs away from home because he fears he has gotten his girlfriend pregnant. He first stays in a boarding house run by Sage (Dick Sargent). There he meets Terry (Richard Dreyfuss), who refuses to work and makes fun of Dewey for wanting to find a job. Dewey gets a job at a gas station for $1 per hour and moves into a rooming house. He is coming home one night during a downpour and meets Shelley, who has run away from Joanne the prostitute, after Joanne has taken her on a double 'date'. Dewey convinces the police that Shelley is his sister and they allow her to go with him. She stays with Dewey (on the sofa) and soon they fall in love with each other.

Deannie (McCormack) cannot stand her shrewish mother (Lynn Bari) constantly telling her what to do. She runs away to Chicago and meets Loch (Ken Del Conte), a musician who is very possessive of her. She moves in with him, but begins to have feelings for his roommate, Curly (Lance LeGault). Loch comes home and finds Deannie in bed with Curly. In a rage, he beats them both to death.

Joanne's pimp is afraid that Shelley will lead the police to him, so he has her kidnapped and held in a basement. The police rescue her, and she goes back to live with her father. She and Dewey promise to keep in touch.

== Cast ==
- Brooke Bundy as Shelly Allen
- Kevin Coughlin as Dewey Norson
- Lloyd Bochner as Raymond Marquis Allen
- Patty McCormack as Deanie Donford
- Lynn Bari as Mrs. Donford
- Norman Fell as Mr. Donford
- Quentin Dean as Joanne
- Richard Dreyfuss as Terry
- Dick Sargent as Freddie
