= The Bad Seed Returns =

2022 horror drama film

- Television release poster
- Based on: The Bad Seed by William March
- Screenplay by: Ross Burge; Mckenna Grace; Barbara Marshall
- Story by: Ross Burge; Mckenna Grace
- Directed by: Louise Archambault
- Starring: Mckenna Grace; Michelle Morgan; Benjamin Ayres; Marlowe Zimmerman; Jude Wilson; Gabriela Bee; Ella Dixon; Marlee Walchuk; Lorne Cardinal; Patty McCormack
- Country of origin: United States
- Original language: English

Production
- Executive producers: Crystal Burge; Ross Burge; Mckenna Grace; Mark Wolper
- Producer: Charles Cooper
- Production companies: The Wolper Organization; Front Street Productions; Beautiful Ghosts Productions; Warner Bros. Television Studios

Original release
- Network: Lifetime
- Release: September 5, 2022

The Bad Seed Returns is a 2022 American made-for-television horror drama film directed by Louise Archambault, written by Ross Burge, Mckenna Grace, and Barbara Marshall, and starring Grace, Michelle Morgan, Benjamin Ayres, Marlowe Zimmerman, Jude Wilson, Gabriela Bee, Ella Dixon, Marlee Walchuk, Lorne Cardinal, and a special appearance by Patty McCormack. It is the sequel to the 2018 television film The Bad Seed, which was a remake of the 1956 film, as well as having been adapted from William March's 1954 novel. The film premiered on Lifetime on September 5, 2022.

== Plot ==
Six years after her father David's death, 15-year-old Emma Grossman lives with her aunt Angela, Angela's husband Robert, and their baby Cade. Still unsuspected of her crimes, Emma maintains the façade of a normal teenager, hiding her psychopathy beneath school, friends, and dance. Emma struggles with Robert's presence in the household. Robert notes his camping knife is missing. Emma later tries to lure Cade into the pool, but Angela saves him. At school, Emma finds a boarding school brochure and learns Robert wants to send her to St. Crispin's. A new student, Kat, arrives and immediately clashes with Emma. Later, Robert finds his missing knife in Emma's drawer and arranges her transfer to St. Crispin's. Emma has a meltdown and later spies on Robert.

Emma meets with her therapist, who advises her to solve her own problems. Emma pretends to make peace with Robert, but that night, she sabotages his car jack, causing it to fall on him and break his legs. Emma walks away while whistling. During a sleepover, Kat needles Emma during a game of "Never Have I Ever", but the fun ends when Emma is taken to the hospital to see Robert. While comforting Angela, she retrieves Robert's knife. Meanwhile, Robert wakes in the hospital and writes Emma's name. The night before the dance captain election, Emma kidnaps classmate and dance rival Steph's dog which was seen at the beginning. The next day, Steph is absent due to the dog's killing. Steph still wins captain, sending Emma into a rage. She learns Robert returns in a week and has another meltdown.

Robert comes home in a wheelchair with a home nurse, and doesn't remember what exactly happened. At school, Emma and Kat argue as Kat knows Emma's past murders, which Emma denies. The argument ends with Kat slapping Emma, which was seen by Nathan and a teacher gives Kat detention. At the nurse's office, Emma then finds Steph's seizure medication and steals it. Angela receives CCTV footage of Steph's dog being taken by Emma. Before she can process it, she hears Steph has died from a seizure, triggered by Emma. Angela confronts Emma, who denies any involvement with Steph or her dog.

Later, Emma stages a scene to steal Robert's painkillers. Outside with him, she pretends to call Nathan, a classmate she likes. When Robert hurts himself and his home nurse wheels him inside, Emma begins to whistle, triggering his memory. He soon gives Emma an ultimatum: go to St. Crispin's or face imprisonment. Angela discovers Emma has antisocial personality disorder. That night, Emma takes a psychopath test and is pleased with the result. Angela meets family friend Brian to ask about the night he shot her brother David. Brian recalls David making a chilling comment about Emma, and Angela finally understands. Emma steals the home nurse's phone, unplugs the landline, and blocks Angela's calls. She invites Kat over, promising to tell her everything. Emma drugs Kat's hot chocolate, then confesses to her crimes. As Kat dies, Emma calls 911 and frames her for an attack and arson.

Robert hears Cade crying and pushes himself upstairs, only to find a recording in the crib. Emma appears, taunts him, and starts a fire with gasoline. Angela returns and runs inside to save Robert, but they both die from smoke inhalation. Emma carries Cade to safety and plays innocent for arriving firefighters, as Nathan comforts her, unaware of her guilt. Afterward, Emma convinces a social worker to keep her and Cade together. Once alone, she smiles wickedly at the camera.

== Cast ==
- Mckenna Grace as Emma Grossman, a teenage girl who is secretly a murderous psychopath
- Michelle Morgan as Angela Grossman, Emma's paternal aunt and a psychiatrist who has raised her since the death of her brother David. She was previously portrayed by Cara Buono in the first film.
- Benjamin Ayres as Robert Costa, Angela's new husband and Emma's paternal uncle by marriage to her Aunt Angela
- Ella Dixon as Kat Sandburg, Emma's new classmate who knows her past
- Marlowe Zimmerman as Stephanie Lowford, the team captain of the dance team and Emma's classmate and friend who has epilepsy.
- Gabriela Bee as Lola, Emma's classmate and friend
- Lucia Walters as Rachel Lowford, Stephanie's mother
- Marlee Walchuk as Cora, a home-health nurse who is hired to help Robert
- Lorne Cardinal as Brian, the property caretaker of the Grossmans' lake house who shot David in self-defense
- Patty McCormack as Dr. March, Emma's therapist. McCormick portrayed Rhoda Penmark, the character upon whom Emma is based, in the original version of The Bad Seed; her last name is also a reference to William March, who wrote the novel upon which the film is based.
- Jude Wilson as Nathan, Emma's friend and love interest

== Production ==
In November 2021, a sequel to 2018's The Bad Seed was announced with Louise Archambault to direct from a script written by Ross Burge, his daughter Mckenna Grace, and Barbara Marshall, with Grace reprising her role from the first film. Filming began later that month in Vancouver.

The film was originally scheduled for release on Lifetime on May 30, 2022. On May 25, 2022, the film was delayed to later in the year in light of the Robb Elementary School shooting in Uvalde, Texas. The film ultimately debuted on Lifetime on September 5, 2022.
