= Peck's Bad Boy =

Fictional character

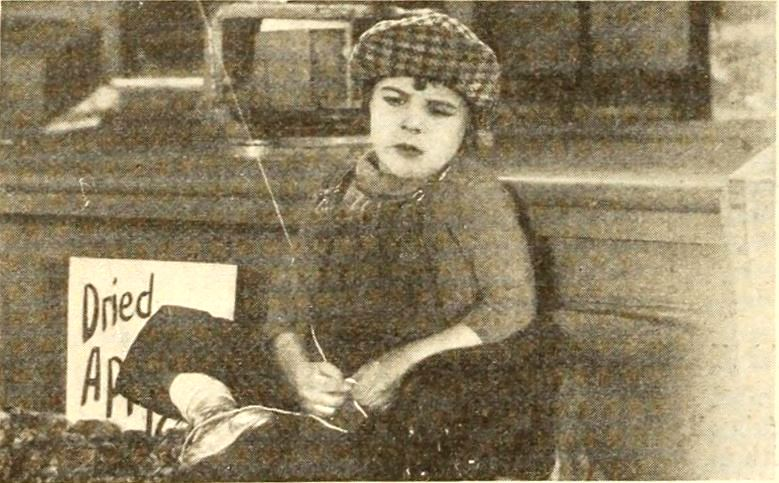
- Jackie Coogan as the Bad Boy in the 1921 film
- First appearance: Peck's Bad Boy and His Pa (1883)
- Created by: George Wilbur Peck

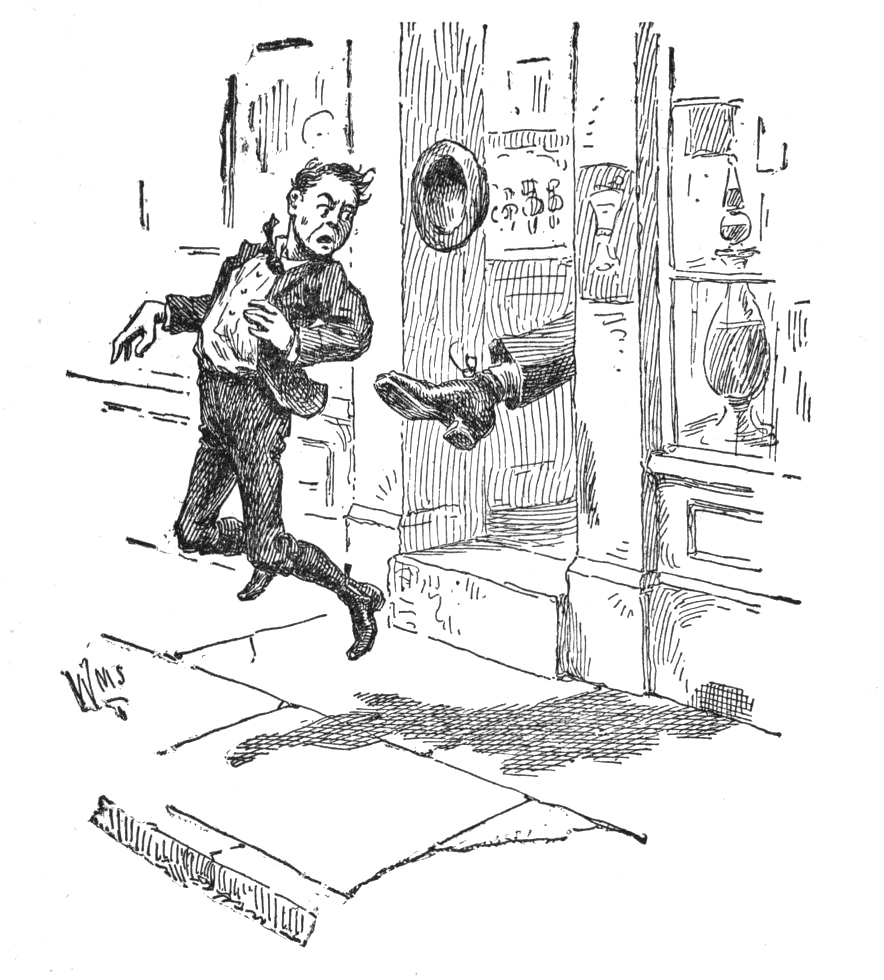
Hennery gets kicked out of a drug store (art by True Williams)

Henry "Hennery" Peck, popularly known as Peck's Bad Boy, is a fictional character created by George Wilbur Peck (1840–1916). First appearing in the 1883 novel Peck's Bad Boy and His Pa, the Bad Boy has appeared in numerous print, stage, and film adaptations. The character is portrayed as a mischievous prankster, and the phrase "Peck's bad boy" has entered the language to refer to anyone whose mischievous or bad behavior leads to annoyance or embarrassment. Described as "a vicious little swaggerer" and "no more than a callous brute", Hennery's antics were more mean-spirited than those of earlier boyhood characters like Huckleberry Finn, and modern criticism views the violence and racism in the original stories as objectionable or politically incorrect. The inspiration for Hennery—the Bad Boy—came from Edward James Watson, who was a telegraph messenger boy that Peck met in the early 1880s. Apparently Watson thought up many of the stories used by Peck. Mr Watson had in his possession a letter from Peck "To my friend E. J. Watson, who, as a boy, gave me the first idea that culminated in the Peck's Bad Boy Series".

== Books ==
- Peck's Bad Boy and His Pa (1883)
- The Grocery Man and Peck's Bad Boy (1883)
- Peck's Bad Boy Abroad (1905)
- The Adventures of Peck's Bad Boy (1906)
- Peck's Bad Boy with the Circus (1906)
- Peck's Bad Boy with the Cowboys (1908)
- Peck's Bad Boy in an Airship (1908)

== Films ==
- The Bad Boy and the Groceryman (1905)
- Peck's Bad Boy (1908)
- Peck's Bad Boy (1921)
- Peck's Bad Boy (1934)
- Peck's Bad Boy with the Circus (1938)
- A scene from the stage version of Peck's Bad Boy is featured in the 1942 film Yankee Doodle Dandy showing Douglas Croft as a teenage George M. Cohan in the title role.

== Stage ==
- Peck's Bad Boy (1884) by Charles Felton Pidgin

== See also ==
- Peck's Bad Girl, 1918 film, written by Tex Charwate
- Peck's Bad Girl (TV series), 1959 television show, unrelated to the movie
