= The Bad Seed =

1954 novel by William March

- First edition
- Author: William March
- Language: English
- Genre: Psychological horror
- Publisher: Rinehart & Company
- Publication date: April 8, 1954
- Publication place: United States
- Media type: Print (hardcover and paperback)
- Pages: 247 pp (reprint edition)
- ISBN: 978-0-06-079548-1 (reprint edition)
- OCLC: 61157841
- Dewey Decimal: 813.52
- LC Class: PS3505.A53157

The Bad Seed is a 1954 horror novel by American writer William March, the last of his major works published before his death.

Nominated for the 1955 National Book Award for Fiction, The Bad Seed tells the story of a mother's realization that her young daughter is a murderer. Its enormous critical and commercial success was largely realized after March's death only one month after publication.

In 1954, the novel was adapted into a successful and long-running Broadway play by Maxwell Anderson and into an Academy Award-nominated 1956 film directed by Mervyn LeRoy.

== Plot ==
Eight-year-old Rhoda Penmark is the only child of Christine and Kenneth Penmark. While she is cherished by adults for her sweet and intelligent nature, her classmates at Fern Grammar School avoid her, sensing something "isn't quite right" about her.

After her husband leaves on a business trip, Christine notices Rhoda's callous attitude regarding the sudden death of her classmate, Claude Daigle — while his death was deemed accidental, he had unexplainable crescent-shaped marks imprinted on his face. Christine learns that, before Claude's death, Rhoda quarreled with him over a medal for perfect penmanship that he won but that Rhoda believed she deserved.

Rhoda's indifference to the boy's death causes Christine to reevaluate troubling incidents from the past, such as the mysterious deaths of her pet dog and Rhoda's elderly babysitter. Disturbed by the idea that her daughter might be behind all these tragedies, Christine investigates and discovers she was adopted by her own parents: her birth mother, Bessie Denker, was a serial killer who died in the electric chair. As her mental state deteriorates, Christine begins writing letters to her husband discussing Rhoda, blaming herself for passing the "bad seed" gene to their daughter. She never mails the letters out of fear someone would read them and call the authorities.

The only other adult aware of Rhoda's true nature is Leroy Jessup, the maintenance man who works and lives at the Penmarks' apartment complex, who relentlessly teases the girl regarding Claude's death. She's indifferent to his teasing until Leroy insinuates that Rhoda used her cleated shoes to beat Claude, explaining the crescent-shaped marks left on his face. Afraid he will expose her, she waits until Leroy is asleep before lighting his mattress ablaze and locking him inside his shed; a horrified Christine witnesses the murder from afar.

Christine confronts Rhoda, who confesses to the murders while expressing no remorse. Not wanting her daughter to suffer the same fate as Denker, Christine secretly gives Rhoda an overdose of sleeping pills; after destroying the unsent letters, Christine shoots herself in the head. The gunshot is heard by a neighbor, who breaks into the apartment and saves Rhoda. Christine dies in the hospital while a heartbroken Kenneth returns home. With all evidence of her actions destroyed, Rhoda is free to kill again.

== Characters ==
=== Main ===
- Rhoda Penmark: a high-functioning sociopath, although the term was not popularized at the time the book was written. She has no conscience, and will not hesitate to harm or kill whoever stands in her way at achieving her goal. She sees murder as something that is necessary if she believes her target to be a potential threat. An adept manipulator, Rhoda can easily charm and mislead adults, while eliciting fear and revulsion from other children, who can sense that something is wrong with her. It is implied that she inherited these traits from her maternal grandmother Bessie Denker, who was a famous convicted serial killer. By the time her mother Christine puts the facts together, Rhoda has already killed at least two people and a dog. She also kills Leroy Jessup, the apartment building's live-in gardener. When Christine uncovers Rhoda's dark secret, she attempts murder-suicide by Rhoda by giving her enough pills to cause an overdose and shooting herself; however, this proves to be unsuccessful when their landlady saves Rhoda's life. Rhoda is indifferent to her mother's suicide and it is implied she will follow in the footsteps of her infamous grandmother.
- Christine Penmark: The young and empathetic mother of Rhoda Penmark. Christine is described as very beautiful. She has Nordic feminine features that are traced to her biological father. She is well-groomed, intelligent, and despite being a traditional 1950s homemaker, she is very independent. She slowly pieces together that Rhoda is a killer. Christine doesn't know whether she should love or hate her daughter, but knows that Rhoda will kill again if something is not done. She discovers that her own biological mother was Bessie Denker, an infamous serial killer who was executed. In the end, Christine finally attempts to kill Rhoda to stop her, then shoots herself in the head.
- Leroy Jessup: The crude maintenance man who works for the elderly landlady, Monica Breedlove. He is a depraved individual and sees Rhoda as a kindred spirit. Due to his crude mind and dark sense of humor, he is the only adult character, other than Christine, who notices that Rhoda is unlike other children and enjoys teasing her. Rhoda only reacts to his teasing when he claims to have the shoes with which she killed Claude. When the realization sets in that she actually did kill Claude, he denies ever having them. Shortly thereafter, he is locked inside his makeshift shed by Rhoda, who sets the shed on fire, leaving him inside to die.
- Monica Breedlove: The Penmarks' landlady and Christine's confidante, she is an older pretentious woman who considers herself to be somewhat of a psychotherapist and claims she was once examined by Sigmund Freud. Monica adores Rhoda, whom she believes to be extraordinary, even wishing the child were hers. Monica knows that Christine is upset but suspects she is either ill, or that her marriage with Kenneth is under strain. Monica never discovers the truth about Rhoda and is confused as to why Christine would kill herself.
- Reginald Tasker: A writer and friend to Monica, he provides Christine with information about an infamous serial killer, Bessie Denker. He becomes friends with, and later is to attracted to, Christine. He informs Christine that the man she has known as her biological father, Richard Bravo, worked diligently on the Denker case. Tasker mentions that Bessie Denker's youngest daughter was her only surviving family.
- Claude Daigle: The only child of Hortense and Dwight Daigle, he is described as a timid and sensitive boy who rarely stood up to others. He is shown being fussed over by his anxious mother at the start of the novel and was last seen running away from Rhoda towards the lake at the school picnic. It turns out that when he refused to give Rhoda the penmanship medal award he won, she repeatedly hit him so hard with her shoe that she knocked him unconscious. He then fell off the pier and quickly drowned.
- Hortense Daigle: Mother of Claude Daigle, presented as smothering and over-attentive. A plain, large woman who believes that the Fern sisters and others look down on her for having once been a hairdresser and marrying late in life, she is devastated by her son's death and turns to alcohol as a source of comfort. She senses that Rhoda knows something about or had something to do with her son's death and seeks her out twice to cajole answers.
- Bessie Denker: A well-known (fictional) serial killer. She is the biological mother of Christine Penmark and the grandmother of Rhoda Penmark. Christine faintly remembers living with her biological family and escaping from her mother. Denker never makes a physical appearance in the novel, having long ago been executed. The character's life and murderous history is thoroughly described in the notes of Reginald Tasker. Denker's career is based very roughly on the real-life careers of Belle Gunness and Jane Toppan. The description of her execution in the electric chair is based on that of Ruth Snyder.

=== Minor characters ===
- Kenneth Penmark: The father of Rhoda and husband of Christine. Kenneth is away on business when the novel begins and he does not return until the very end, after his wife's suicide. Kenneth never discovers the truth about Rhoda or the reasoning behind Christine's suicide and attempted murder of Rhoda as his wife neglected to leave him any information, even confidentially, and had destroyed her earlier unsent letters.
- Emory Wages: Monica Breedlove's brother, who lives with his sister. He flirts with Christine at different social gatherings.
- Claudia Fern: The Fern sister who reprimands Rhoda for harassing Claude the day of the picnic. She describes the events the day of the picnic to Christine along with her two other sisters. She informs Christine that Rhoda will not be welcome to attend their school the following term.
- Octavia Fern: Fern sister who explains to Christine why the sisters did not ask the Penmarks to donate money for a flower arrangement to be presented at Claude's funeral.
- Burgess Fern: Fern sister in charge of enrollment at the Fern School.
- Richard Bravo: Christine's adopted father, who was killed in an airplane crash during World War II. He was a well-known columnist and war correspondent, performing great research in the "Bessie Denker" case. He never told Christine she was adopted or that Bessie Denker was her biological mother.
- Dwight Daigle: Father of Claude Daigle. He tries to help his anguished wife and keep her under control as she suffers from the death of their son. The character's forename was changed from Dwight in the novel to Henry for the 1956 play and film, and to Fred for the 1985 television adaptation.
- Mrs. Forsythe: An elderly woman said to have been a great beauty in her youth. She is thought by Monica to be a bit simple-minded. Like most of the other adults, she is enchanted by Rhoda, and she often babysits her (and even offers to take in Rhoda after Christine's death). Rhoda never harms Mrs. Forsythe because she does not have anything Rhoda wants.
- Thelma Jessup: The wife of Leroy Jessup. She is described as big and dull, yet she is astute enough to warn Leroy that he is asking for trouble if he continues to tease Rhoda.
- Belle Blackwell: Teacher of the Sunday school Rhoda attends who gives Rhoda a copy of Elsie Dinsmore.
- Clara Post: The elderly woman who lived with her daughter Edna in the same apartment house as the Penmarks in Baltimore, Maryland. She was charmed by Rhoda, then six years old, and befriended her, promising that when she died Rhoda could have her floating opal ball pendant. She fell to her death in Rhoda's presence when Edna was out. Edna was skeptical of Rhoda's story about her mother's death and did not invite the Penmarks to the funeral or speak to them afterwards.

== Primary theme ==
=== Nature versus nurture ===
In the decade the novel was published, juvenile delinquency began to be far more common, or at least more extensively reported and documented. Compared to earlier history, the idea of child crimes was a new phenomenon. A controversy about nature vs nurture arose as psychiatric explanations were proposed for juvenile delinquency, with the debate being whether inborn tendencies ("nature") are more or less important than environmental factors ("nurture") in explaining deviant behavior.

Supporters of the "nature" side suggested that some people are born evil or with malicious tendencies. The idea that nature prevails over nurture is implied in The Bad Seed. March incorporates the notion that a murderous genetic trait is being passed down through the generations. Within the plot of the story, Rhoda is a serial murderer just like her grandmother, having inherited the murderous gene. Rhoda had been brought up as a privileged child; she was nurtured emotionally and physically and thus a broken home life was not to blame for her actions. Tasker hints and suggests at the idea of nature taking effect when he quotes that "some people are just born evil", when discussing Denker with Christine.

Psychologist Robert D. Hare, who argues that the evidence suggests psychopathy is an inborn trait, discusses The Bad Seed in his 1993 non-fiction book Without Conscience. A lengthy quote from the novel opens Hare's book, describing in March's words how most decent individuals are not by nature suspicious and thus unable to understand or anticipate the acts of evil and depravity that some people are capable of committing. Later in his book, Hare argues that March's novel is a "remarkably true to life" portrayal of the development of psychopathy in childhood, illustrating both Rhoda's callous use of others to serve her own ends as well as Christine's growing helplessness and desperation as she realizes the extent of her daughter's behavior.

== Reviews ==
- James Kelly, The New York Times:

"Let it be said quickly: William March knows where human fears and secrets are buried. He announced it in Company K, a novel published twenty years ago and equaled only by Dos Passos' Three Soldiers as a sampling of men at war. He has proved it again and again in the other novels and short stories, all of them floored and walled in what Clifton Fadiman decided to call "Psychological acumen". But nowhere is this gift better displayed than in The Bad Seed — the portrayal of a coldly evil, murderous child and what she does to both victims and family. In the author's hands this is adequate material for an absolutely first class novel of moral bewilderments and responsibilities nearest the heart of our decade."

- Dan Wickenden, New York Herald Tribune:

"Dark, original, ultimately appalling, William March's extraordinary new novel is, on the obvious level, a straightforward, technically accomplished story of suspense. The manner of its telling — the dispassionate, exact, almost starched prose, with its occasional glints of sardonic humor — is an impressive achievement in itself. It lends some credibility to a narrative against which the imagination rebels; and towards the end, as horror is piled upon horror, it saves the book from falling headlong into absurdity... This is a novel bound to arouse strong responses, to generate vehement discussion, and so not easily to be forgotten."

- August Derleth, Chicago Sunday Tribune:

"The Bad Seed would have been a stronger novel without this false premise — the granddaughter of a murderess is no more likely to be a murderess than the granddaughter of a seamstress, or anyone else. Apart from this flaw, however, The Bad Seed is a novel of suspense and mounting horror, which the reader who can close his eyes to March's unnecessary premise will enjoy as the work of one of the most satisfying of American novelists."

- L. A. G. Strong, The Spectator (UK):

"The Bad Seed is terrifyingly good, not only because its theme is worked out so powerfully, but because every character is convincing. One has to believe that these appalling things took place exactly as the author says they did."

== Adaptations ==
=== Broadway play ===
Maxwell Anderson adapted the book for the stage almost immediately after its publication. Anderson had previously won the New York Drama Critics' Circle Award in 1935 and 1936 for his plays Winterset and High Tor, as well as the Pulitzer Prize for Drama in 1933 for his play Both Your Houses. Reginald Denham directed the play using Anderson's script. The play opened on Broadway on December 8, 1954, at the 46th Street Theatre (now the Richard Rodgers Theatre), less than a year after the publication of the novel.

On April 25, 1955, the play transferred to the Coronet Theatre (now the Eugene O'Neill Theatre), where it completed its successful run of 334 performances on September 27, 1955. Nancy Kelly, the actress who played Christine, won the 1955 Tony Award for Best Actress in a Play. The audience made claims that Patty McCormack, the child actress who played Rhoda, was the most memorable character.

=== 1956 film ===
Mervyn LeRoy was the director of the 1956 movie. In LeRoy's Hollywood career, he produced and or directed over 70 films including Little Caesar and Little Women. Nancy Kelly, Patty McCormack and most of the original cast acted in the 1956 movie. The ending of the 1956 film was changed from that of the novel and the play to comply with the Hollywood Production Code. Rhoda is suddenly struck and killed by lightning when she goes back to the scene of her crime to retrieve the medal (allowing an interpretation of divine intervention), while Christine survives her suicide attempt. During the closing credits, LeRoy added a light-hearted sequence of Nancy Kelly, Christine, holding Patty McCormack, Rhoda, over her leg and spanking her –possibly to remind audiences that this is just a movie.

=== 1985 film ===
The Bad Seed was remade as a television movie in 1985, adapted by George Eckstein and directed by Paul Wendkos and kept the novel's original ending but changed other details, including some forenames (i.e. Claude Daigle → Mark Daigle, Hortense Daigle → Rita Daigle, Claudia Fern → Alice Fern) and added a scene in which young Christine escapes into a cornfield from her own sociopathic mother, Bessie Denker.

This version starred Blair Brown as Christine, Lynn Redgrave as Monica, David Ogden Stiers as Emory, David Carradine as Leroy, and Chad Allen as Mark Daigle (whose character was never seen before, only referenced). Carrie Wells played the title character, whose name was changed from Rhoda to Rachel. The TV-movie version was considered inferior to both the play and original film by critics.

=== 2018 film ===
In December 2017, Deadline Hollywood reported that Rob Lowe would direct and star in a television remake for Lifetime network. This version of The Bad Seed first ran on Lifetime on September 9, 2018, and was watched by 1.87 million viewers, placing it in the top ten most-watched cable programs on that date. However, the production received mixed reviews.

A sequel, The Bad Seed Returns, was released in 2022.

== Bibliography ==
=== Works cited ===
- Showalter, Elaine (1997). Insights, Interviews & More. New York: HarperCollins Publishers.
- Murray, Rebecca (September 6, 2018). "'The Bad Seed' Sprouts for Director Eli Roth". About.com Guide.
