= Rhoda Penmark =

- The Bad Seed character
- Color portrait of McCormack for the 1956 film.
- First appearance: The Bad Seed
- Last appearance: The Bad Seed Returns
- Created by: William March
- Portrayed by: Film: Patty McCormack; Carrie Wells (Note: As Rachel Penmark); Mckenna Grace (Note: As Emma Grossman); Stage: Patty McCormack

In-universe information
- Gender: Female
- Family: Christine Penmark (mother); Kenneth Penmark (father); Richard Bravo (adopted maternal grandfather); Bessie Denker (biological maternal grandmother)
- Nationality: American
- Classification: Serial killer

Rhoda Penmark is a fictional character in William March's 1954 novel The Bad Seed and the stage play of the same name adapted from it by Maxwell Anderson. Penmark is a child serial killer and psychopath who manipulates those around her. She was portrayed by Patty McCormack in the original rendition of the play and later in the 1956 film adaptation. She was also portrayed by Carrie Wells in the 1985 made-for-television adaptation, where she is called Rachel Penmark. In the 2018 adaptation and its sequel, she is known as Emma Grossman and portrayed by Mckenna Grace.

== Overview ==
Rhoda Penmark is an eight-year-old girl who is charming, polite, and intelligent beyond her years. Beneath her lovable facade, however, she is a sociopath (or psychopath) who is willing to harm and even kill anyone to get whatever she wants, whenever she wants it. She is also a precociously talented con artist, adept at manipulating adults. Other children, who can sense her true nature, avoid her. In the beginning of the novel, she brutally murders a classmate and a groundskeeper who suspects her. It is also revealed that she murdered an elderly neighbor and her pet dog a few years before.

March writes that Rhoda's ‘evil’ is ‘genetic’: her maternal grandmother, "the incomparable Bessie Denker", was an infamous serial killer who also began killing at Rhoda's age. Rhoda's mother, Christine, was adopted at a very young age and does not remember her biological parents.

== Novel ==
While at a school picnic, Rhoda murders her classmate, Claude Daigle, who won a special penmanship award that she feels she deserved. After killing Claude, she retrieves the medal and leaves the dead boy's body in a local lake. While no one suspects Rhoda at first, Christine notices that her daughter seems startlingly indifferent to the other child's tragic death. Christine, who has always vaguely sensed something wrong with her daughter, is troubled, but dismisses any possibility that Rhoda was actually involved in the boy's death.

Only two adults see through Rhoda's charm — Leroy, the mean-spirited janitor at the Penmarks' apartment building; and, to a lesser extent, her teacher Miss Fern, who observes that she is a poor loser and rather selfish. Once, Rhoda was even expelled from a school for repeatedly being caught lying to teachers and staff, who described her as a "cold, self-sufficient child who plays by her own rules".

Leroy sees Rhoda as a kindred spirit and enjoys teasing her. One day, he spies on Rhoda and repeatedly threatens to "tell on her". Rhoda says no one would believe him, but begins to make plans to get rid of him, just in case.

Christine tries to relieve her fears by talking abstractly about the murder with her adopted father and Mrs. Breedlove, a neighbor who dabbles in psychiatric theories about personality. During the conversation, she recovers a long-repressed memory of her real mother, "the incomparable Bessie Denker", a serial poisoner who died in the electric chair. That night, Claude's mother arrives, distraught and drunk, at Christine's home stating that there is "something funny about this whole thing" and asks Christine to ask Rhoda about her last few moments with the boy. While Christine is locating Rhoda's necklace, which Mrs. Breedlove is having engraved for the child, Christine finds the penmanship medal in Rhoda's treasure chest. She confronts Rhoda, who initially denies having done anything wrong, but confesses after Christine finds the bloodied shoes with which Rhoda had beaten Claude before drowning him. Christine is horrified, but Rhoda cannot understand what all the fuss is about; after all, she says, "It was Claude Daigle who drowned, not me".

While Christine grapples with what to do, Rhoda silences Leroy by setting his mattress on fire while he is sleeping. When she learns what her daughter has done, Christine makes a gut-wrenching decision: She must kill Rhoda to keep her from killing again. She gives her a lethal dose of sleeping pills, hoping she will die without pain, and then commits suicide by shooting herself in the head.

Rhoda survives when a neighbor hears the shot and takes her to the hospital. Nobody is the wiser as to what Rhoda has done, and she is free to kill again.

== Film adaptations ==
Patty McCormack portrayed Rhoda in the 1956 film adaptation. The ending was revised to fit the Hays Code, which did not permit characters to get away with their crimes. In this version, Rhoda is presumably killed by a bolt of lightning, while Christine survives her suicide attempt. After this scene there is a theater-style curtain call. After Nancy Kelly’s name and character is said, she walks over to the couch where McCormack is sitting, puts McCormack over her lap, and proceeds to spank her over her dress as McCormack repeatedly screams “NO!”.

The character was played by Carrie Wells in the 1985 made for TV remake in which her name was changed from Rhoda to Rachel.

In the 2018 remake starring and directed by Rob Lowe, the character is portrayed by Mckenna Grace and has been renamed to Emma Grossman.

== Reception ==
She is ranked 12th on Bloody Disgusting's list of "The Top 16 Creepiest Kids in Horror Movie History". Brian Solomon writes, "The grand-mammy of all messed-up horror movie kids, Rhoda Penmark is a pint-sized terror of biblical proportions. If you think the ADHD-addled rugrats you see roaming shopping malls nowadays are bad, you ain't seen nothin' yet". Kristian Wilson of Bustle listed her among the "19 Creepiest Kids In Fiction" and stated that she was "the bad little girl to end all bad little girls".

== See also ==
- List of horror film villains
