= Patty McCormack =

American actress (born 1945)

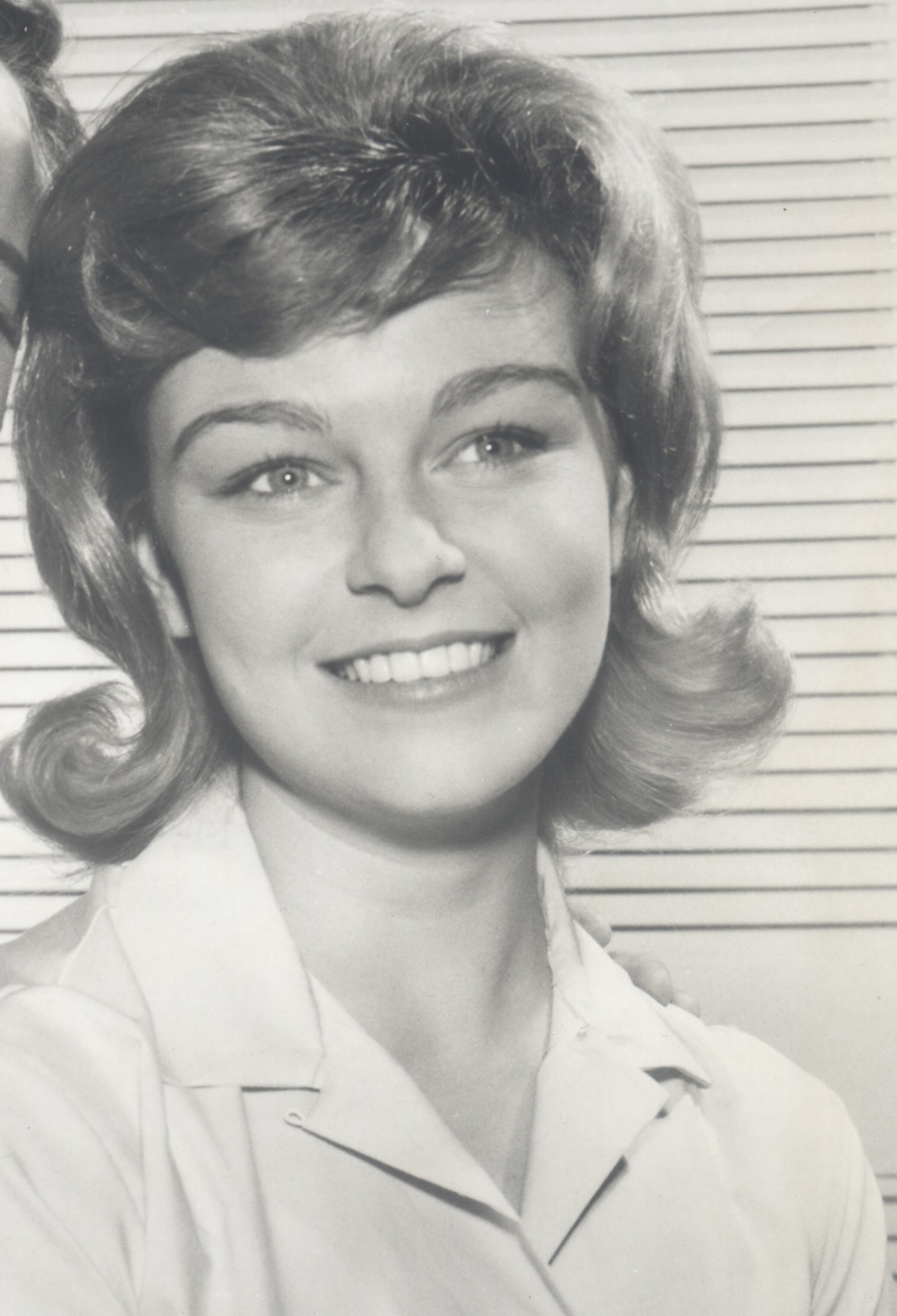
- McCormack in a photo release of the television series The New Breed, 1962
- Born: Patricia Ellen Russo; August 21, 1945 (age 81); New York City, U.S.
- Occupation: Actress
- Years active: 1951–present
- Spouse: Bob Catania (m. 1967; div. 1973)
- Children: 2

Patricia McCormack (born Patricia Ellen Russo; August 21, 1945) is an American actress with a career in theater, films, and television.

McCormack began her career as a child actress. She is perhaps best known for her performance as Rhoda Penmark in Maxwell Anderson's 1954 psychological drama The Bad Seed. She received critical acclaim for the role on Broadway and was nominated for an Oscar for Best Supporting Actress for her performance in Mervyn LeRoy's film adaptation. Her acting career has continued with both starring and supporting roles in film and television, including Helen Keller in the original Playhouse 90 production of The Miracle Worker, Jeffrey Tambor's wife Anne Brookes on the ABC sitcom The Ropers, Adriana La Cerva's mother in The Sopranos, and as Pat Nixon in Frost/Nixon (2008).

== Life and career ==
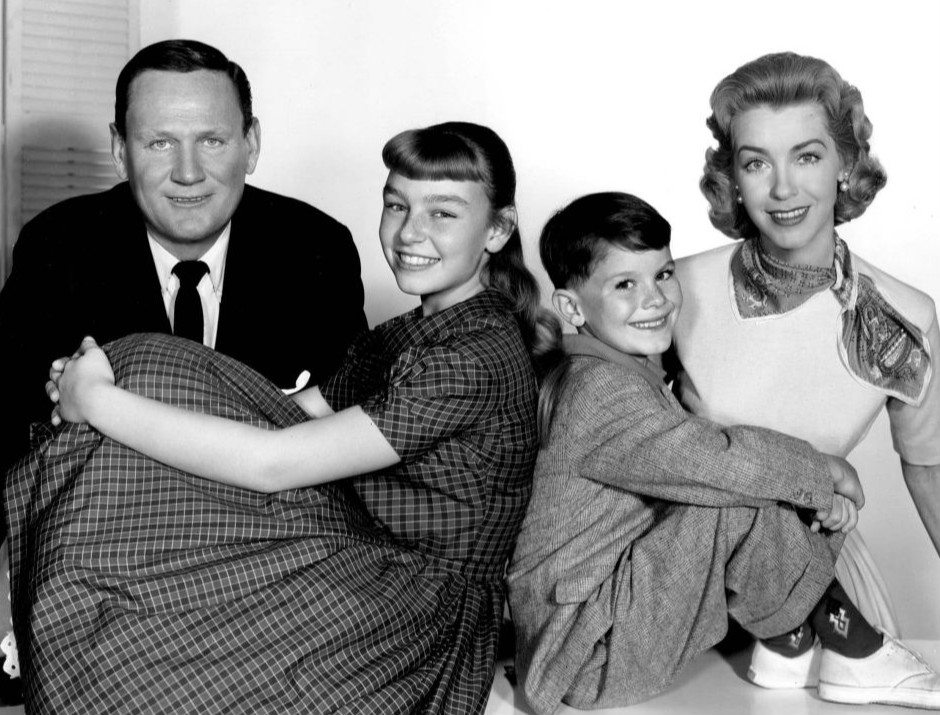
The cast of Peck's Bad Girl: From left: Wendell Corey, McCormack, Ray Farrell, Marsha Hunt

McCormack was born in New York City on August 21, 1945, as Patricia Ellen Russo. Her parents divorced when she was young, and she took on her maternal grandmother's surname. Her father, Frank Russo, was a fireman and a friend of Walter Matthau; as a favor to Frank, Matthau secured McCormack a deal with his agent, Leonard Hirshan, when she was a teenager. She attended New Utrecht High School in 1958.

McCormack made her motion-picture debut in Two Gals and a Guy (1951) and appeared as Ingeborg in the television series Mama with Peggy Wood from 1953 to 1956. Her Broadway debut was in Touchstone (1953), and the following year, she originated the role of Rhoda Penmark, an 8-year-old psychopathic serial killer, in Maxwell Anderson's The Bad Seed (1954) with Nancy Kelly. She was nominated for an Academy Award for Best Supporting Actress for the film version (1956). She portrayed Helen Keller in the original 1957 Playhouse 90 production of William Gibson's The Miracle Worker opposite Teresa Wright.

In 1959 she was in an episode of One Step Beyond called "Make Me Not a Witch". She had the role of a pampered child star in the 1958 comedy Kathy O' and recorded the title song for Dot Records. McCormack briefly starred in her own series, Peck's Bad Girl, with Marsha Hunt and Wendell Corey in 1959, and had a leading role in MGM's remake of The Adventures of Huckleberry Finn with Eddie Hodges. In the early 1960s, she starred in a series of popular teenage delinquent films, including The Explosive Generation with William Shatner and The Young Runaways. In 1962, she portrayed Julie Cannon in the Rawhide episode "Incident of the Wolvers" (s.5, e.8); she appeared on the show again the following year, playing Sarah Higgins in the episode "Incident at Paradise".

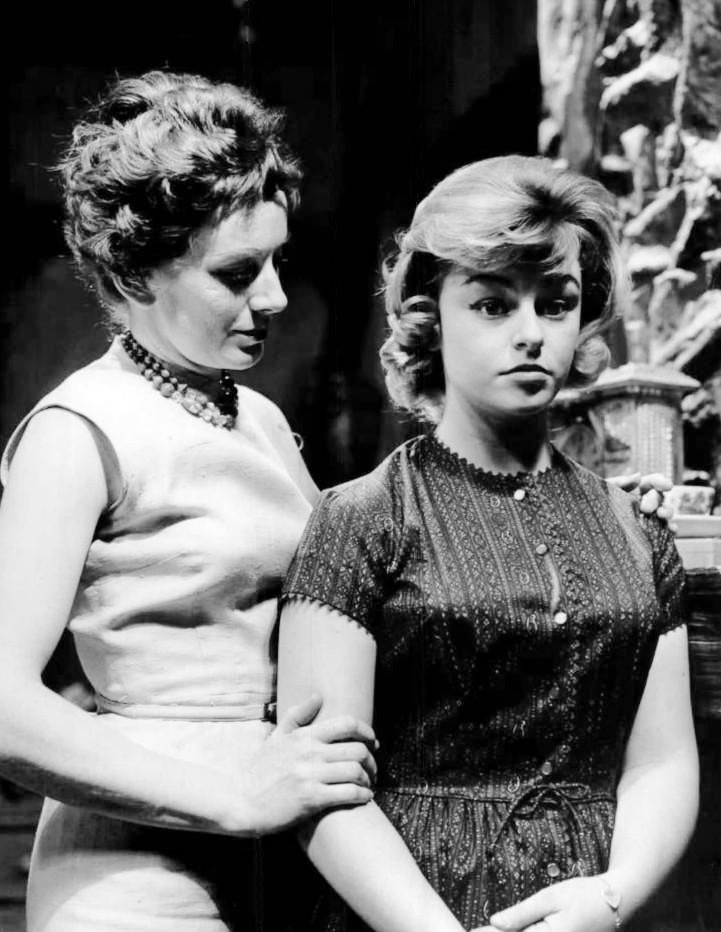
Patty McCormack (right) in 1962. She is seen here in the soap opera Young Doctor Malone

After a half-dozen teen roles during the 1960s, her film career gradually declined, but she continued to work in television. In 1970, she played Linda Warren on the soap opera The Best of Everything. She guest-starred on The Streets of San Francisco, season two, episode "Blockade". She also portrayed a San Francisco paramedic on the season-seven Emergency! series episodes "What's a Nice Girl Like You Doing...?" and "The Convention". She resumed her cinema career with Bug in 1975. She played advertising executive Beth Donaldson in "The Little People" episode of "The Love Boat" S2 E10 which aired on 11/24/1978.

McCormack held several recurring roles in popular television series, including Dallas; Murder, She Wrote; and The Sopranos. McCormack also starred as Anne Brookes, the wife of Jeffrey P. Brookes III (played by Jeffrey Tambor) on the ABC television series The Ropers, a spin-off of Three's Company starring Norman Fell and Audra Lindley, from 1979 to 1980. When Kathryn Hays left the CBS soap opera As the World Turns for an extended period, McCormack took Hays' role until she returned. She starred as a psychotic mother in the cult thriller Mommy and its 1997 sequel Mommy 2: Mommy's Day. In 2008, McCormack played First Lady Pat Nixon in the feature film Frost/Nixon. McCormack continues to work regularly and she costarred in the 2012 series Have You Met Miss Jones?. A recent film appearance is in the 2014 release Chicanery and she guest-starred in a 2013 episode of the series Hart of Dixie. Her most notable recent work was in the Paul Thomas Anderson film The Master.

In April 2018, it was announced that McCormack would join the cast of General Hospital temporarily replacing Leslie Charleson in the role of Monica Quartermaine due to injuries Charleson sustained in a fall. In September 2018, McCormack portrayed Dr. March, the child psychiatrist consulted in the 2018 television remake of The Bad Seed. She starred in Dan Lauria's play Just Another Day in 2023 at Ellenville, New York, in 2024 at an off-Broadway venue Theater555, and in 2025 at Trinity College Dublin, Ireland.

== Awards ==
McCormack was nominated for an Academy Award for Best Supporting Actress and a Golden Globe for Best Supporting Actress for The Bad Seed. On March 20, 1956, she received the Milky Way "Gold Star Award" as the most outstanding juvenile performer, in which Sal Mineo was placed third and Tommy Rettig second.

Her star on the Hollywood Walk of Fame is at 6312 Hollywood Boulevard. She received the star in 1960 aged 15, making her the youngest honoree on the Walk.

== Selected filmography ==
=== Film ===
Year	Title	Role	Notes	Ref.
1951	Two Gals and a Guy	Fay Oliver		
1951	Here Comes the Groom	Orphan	Uncredited	
1954	There's No Business Like Show Business	Little Laughing Girl	Uncredited	
1956	The Bad Seed	Rhoda Penmark		
1957	The Snow Queen	Angel / the Robber Girl	Voice; 1959 English version	
1957	All Mine to Give	Annabelle Eunson		
1958	Kathy O'	Kathy O'Rourke		
1960	The Adventures of Huckleberry Finn	Joanna Wilkes		
1961	The Explosive Generation	Janet Sommers		
1962	Jacktown	Margaret		
1968	Maryjane	Susan Hoffman		
1968	The Mini-Skirt Mob	Edie		
1968	The Young Runaways	Deanie Donford		
1975	Bug	Sylvia Ross		
1984	Invitation to Hell	Mary Peterson	Television film	
1988	Saturday the 14th Strikes Back	Kate Baxter		
1995	Mommy	Mommy		
1997	Mommy's Day	Mrs. Sterling		
2001	Acceptable Risk	Lois	Television film	
2003	The Kiss	Priscilla Standhope		
2004	Target	Maysie	Television film	
2004	Shallow Ground	Helen Reedy		
2004	Gone, But Not Forgotten	Andrea Hammerhill	Television film	
2005	Heart of the Beholder	Helen		
2008	Frost/Nixon	Pat Nixon		
2012	The Master	Mildred Drummond		
2018	The Bad Seed	Dr. March	Television film	
2022	The Bad Seed Returns	Dr. March	Television film	

=== Television ===
Year	Title	Role	Notes	Ref.
1957-1959	Playhouse 90	Various Roles		
1959	Peck's Bad Girl	Torey Peck		
1959	Wagon Train	Mary Ellen Thomas	Episode: "The Mary Ellen Thomas Story"	
1959	Alcoa Presents: One Step Beyond	Emmy Horvath	Episode: "Make Me Not a Witch"	
1960	Rawhide	Julie		
1960–1961	Route 66	Jenny Slade / Jan Emerson	2 episodes	
1962	The New Breed	Karen Kegler		
1972-1979	Emergency!	Janet Caldwell / Gail Warren	1 episode, 1 telefilm	
1979–1980	The Ropers	Anne Brookes		
1982	Magnum, P.I.	Carol Baldwin		
1987	Murder, She Wrote	Lana Whitman	Episode: "No Accounting for Murder"	
1988	Murder, She Wrote	Det. Kathleen Chadwick	Episode: "Wearing of the Green"	
2000–2006	The Sopranos	Liz La Cerva		
2004	Mystery Woman	Barbara Somers	Television film	
2004	Cold Case	Mavis Breen	Episode: "Greed"	
2005	Criminal Minds	Marcia Gordon		
2009	Private Practice	Cynthia		
2010	Desperate Housewives	Teresa Pruitt		
2012	Supernatural	Eleanor Holmes / Betsy		
2012	Scandal	Anne Pierce		
2013	Hart of Dixie	Sylvie Stephens-Wilkes		

=== Stage ===
Year	Title	Role	Notes
1953	Touchstone	Cathy Roberts	Music Box Theatre, Broadway
1954	The Bad Seed	Rhoda Penmark	46th Street Theatre, Broadway
1983	Cat on a Hot Tin Roof	Mae	Mark Taper Forum
2000	The Ladies of the Corridor	Lulu Ames	The Tamarind Theatre
2021	Morning's at Seven	Esther Crampton	Theater at St. Clements, Off-Broadway
2024	Just Another Day	Woman	Theater 555, Off-Broadway
2025	Just Another Day	Woman	Ireland Tour
2025	Just Another Day	Woman	Odyssey Theatre
2025	Just Another Day	Woman	New Jersey Repertory

=== Video games ===
Year	Title	Role	Ref.
2021	Cookie Run: Kingdom	Dark Enchantress Cookie (voice)	

== Radio appearances ==
Year	Program	Episode/source
1956	Suspense	The Doll

== Awards and nominations ==
Year	Award	Category	Nominated work	Result
1957	Academy Awards	Best Supporting Actress	The Bad Seed	Nominated
1957	Golden Globe Awards	Best Supporting Actress	The Bad Seed	Nominated
2021	Studio City Film Festival Awards	Best Ensemble Cast	Barking Mad	Won
2023	Riverside International Film Festival Awards	Best Ensemble Cast	Deadly Draw	Won

== See also ==
- List of oldest and youngest Academy Award winners and nominees
