= The Bad Seed (play) =

1954 play by Maxwell Anderson

- Original language: English
- Written by: Maxwell Anderson
- Characters: Rhoda Penmark; Christine Penmark
- Genre: Drama

Premiere
- Date: December 8, 1954
- Place: Broadway – at the 46th Street Theatre; New York City, United States

The Bad Seed is a 1954 play by American playwright Maxwell Anderson, adapted from the 1954 novel of the same name by American writer William March.

== Characters ==
- Rhoda Penmark is the seemingly perfect daughter of Christine and Kenneth Penmark. She is an excellent student, talented, and polite to all adults in her life. However, it is later revealed that she is truly very sinister and will do whatever she needs to achieve greatness. In the end of the play, Christine attempts to kill both herself and Rhoda to make sure the secret of Rhoda's actions don't get publicized. However, Monica Breedlove, their landlady, hears the gunshot and saves Rhoda.
- Christine Penmark is Rhoda's mother and Kenneth's wife. She is in close spirits with her adoptive father, Richard Bravo, and learns in the second act that her biological mother was an infamous serial killer named "Bessie Denker". She is also close friends with Monica Breedlove, her brother Emory Breedlove, and Reginald Tasker. In the end of the play, Christine commits suicide by gunshot.
- Leroy Jessup is the Penmarks' janitor who often pulls practical jokes on Rhoda by saying that she was the one who killed Claude Daigle. Only during the climax of the play does Leroy realize that she actually did kill him. To protect her secret, Rhoda sets fire to Leroy's shed and kills him.
- Monica Breedlove is the Penmarks' landlady and Christine's confidante. She is also a self-proclaimed psychiatrist, claiming that she was once examined by Sigmund Freud. In the end of the play, Monica is the one to save Rhoda when she hears Christine's gunshot.
- Emory Wages is Monica's brother and friend of Christine and Reginald. He and Monica often quarrel over small disputes. He attempts to help Leroy when his shed is set on fire but he is unsuccessful.
- Reginald Takser is a novel writer and friend of Monica, Christine, and Emory. He is also a fan of Richard Bravo's writing.
- Richard Bravo is Christine's adoptive father and a columnist for the paper. He also did a lot of research on the case of "Bessie Denker", who is later revealed to be Christine's biological mother.
- Miss Fern is Rhoda's teacher and the headmistress of the local elementary school. She is the first to suspect Rhoda's actions.
- Hortense Daigle is the mother of Claude Daigle and wife of Dwight Daigle. She is an alcoholic and her condition worsens when her son is killed.
- Mr. Daigle is Claude's father and Hortense's husband. He is very quiet and rarely speaks.
- Col. Kenneth Penmark is Christine's husband and Rhoda's father. He is gone at war most of the play but returns in the final scene and promises to love Rhoda forever, unaware of all the damage she has caused.

=== Unseen Characters ===
- Claude Daigle was the son of Dwight and Hortense Daigle who won a penmanship competition at the elementary school. This, unfortunately, leads to his death when Rhoda asks him for the medal and he refuses. He dies by drowning in a wharf by a hill where the school was having a picnic.
- Bessie Denker was Christine's biological mother and an infamous serial killer. She was abusive towards Christine and met her demise in the electric chair.
- Clara Post was Rhoda's babysitter when the Penmarks lived in another neighborhood. Clara always promised Rhoda her a trinket and Rhoda killed her to get it sooner.
- Miss Black is Rhoda's Sunday school teacher who gives her a copy of Elsie Dinsmore.

== Plot ==
The play focuses on the seemingly perfect little girl Rhoda Penmark, who is able to charm her way into getting just about anything she wants. Anything, except a highly coveted penmanship medal that her teacher has awarded to Claude Daigle, one of Rhoda's classmates. During a school outing near the shore, Claude goes missing and it is soon discovered that Claude has drowned near a pier. Rhoda's mother, Christine, begins to suspect that Rhoda had something to do with the boy's death when she finds Claude's penmanship medal hidden in Rhoda's room. Gradually Christine comes to believe that Rhoda was behind other sudden deaths surrounding the family.

Her suspicions challenge Christine to look into her own past, and she learns not only that she was adopted, but also that her biological mother was a ruthless serial killer. Near the end of the play, Christine decides to take both Rhoda's life and her own. She gives Rhoda a large quantity of sleeping pills, telling her they are vitamins. Then she shoots herself in the head, killing herself. Rhoda survives because the sound of the gunshot has alerted her neighbors to investigate and they find Rhoda just in time to save her.

== Production ==
Staged by Reginald Denham, the play opened on Broadway on December 8, 1954, at the 46th Street Theatre in New York City. After five months, the play moved to the Coronet Theatre on 49th Street, and remained there until the final performance on September 27, 1955. The play had run for 334 performances.

The production starred Nancy Kelly (who won the 1955 Tony Award for Best Actress in a Play in the role of Christine Penmark), Patty McCormack (as Rhoda Penmark), Henry Jones (as Leroy), Evelyn Varden (as Monica Breedlove), Joseph Holland (as Emory Wages), Lloyd Gough (as Reginald Takser), Thomas Chalmers (as Richard Bravo), Joan Croydon as (Miss Fern), John O'Hare (as Col. Kenneth Penmark), Wells Richardson as Mr. Daigle, and Eileen Heckart (as Mrs. Daigle).

Interest in the play was strong enough that Life magazine ran an extensive story on the production a week before it opened.

The play was shortlisted for the 1955 Pulitzer Prize for Drama, but Joseph Pulitzer Jr. pressured the prize jury into presenting it to Cat on a Hot Tin Roof instead.

== Film adaptation ==
The play was adapted by John Lee Mahin into an Academy Award-nominated 1956 film of the same name, directed by Mervyn Leroy. Kelly, McCormack, Heckart, Croydon, Varden, and Jones all reprised their stage roles in the film. The first three received Academy Award nominations for their performances. The movie's ending was changed from that of the play for purposes of the Hays Code.
