= List of crime fiction writers =

Crime fiction writers are authors of any subgenre of crime fiction, including detective, mystery or hard-boiled.

== A–B ==
- Megan Abbott (born 1971, United States)
- Jirō Akagawa (born 1948, Japan)
- Boris Akunin (born 1956, Russia)
- Susan Wittig Albert (United States)
- Steve Allen (1921–2000, United States)
- Margery Allingham (1904–1966, England)
- Eric Ambler (1909–1998, England)
- Steve Anderson (born 1966, United States)
- Sarah Andrews (died 2019, United States)
- Gosho Aoyama (born 1963, Japan)
- Charlotte Armstrong (1905–1969, United States)
- Jake Arnott (born 1961, England)
- Gianluca Arrighi (born 1972, Italy)
- Taku Ashibe (born 1958, Japan)
- Isaac Asimov (1920–1992, United States)
- Pieter Aspe (1953–2021, Belgium)
- H. C. Asterley (1902–1973, England)
- Edward Atiyah (1903–1964, Lebanon)
- Edward Attard (born 1947, Malta)
- Yukito Ayatsuji (born 1960, Japan)
- Desmond Bagley (1923–1983, England)
- H. C. Bailey (1878–1961, England)
- Deb Baker (born 1953, United States)
- Sharadindu Bandyopadhyay (1899–1970, India)
- Ashok Banker (born 1964, India)
- Michael Bar-Zohar (born 1938, Israel)
- John Franklin Bardin (1916–1981, United States)
- Burl Barer (born 1947, United States)
- Robert Barnard (1936–2013, England)
- Nevada Barr (born 1952, United States)
- J. J. Barrie (born 1933, Canada)
- Earle Basinsky (1923–1963, United States)
- G. D. Baum (United States)
- William Bayer (born 1939, United States)
- Simon Beckett (born 1960, England)
- George Bellairs (1902–1982, England)
- Robert Leslie Bellem (1902–1968, United States)
- Edmund Clerihew Bentley (1875–1956, England)
- Earl Derr Biggers (1884–1933, United States)
- Mark Billingham (born 1961, England)
- Robert Bloch (1917–1994, United States)
- Lawrence Block (born 1938, United States)
- Deborah Blum (born 1954, United States)
- Ernest Borneman (1915–1995, Germany)
- Ernest Bramah (1868–1942, England)
- Paolo Brera (1949–2019, Italy)
- Simon Brett (born 1945, England)
- P. J. Brooke (Scotland)
- Fredric Brown (1906–1972, United States)
- Pat Brown (born 1955, United States)
- Ken Bruen (1951–2025, Ireland)
- John Buchan (1875–1940, Scotland)
- John Bude (1901–1957, England)
- James Lee Burke (born 1936, United States)
- Jan Burke (born 1953, United States)

== C ==
- James M. Cain (1892–1977, United States)
- Paul Cain (1902–1966, United States)
- Andrea Camilleri (1925–2019, Italy)
- Bernard Capes (1854–1918, England)
- John Dickson Carr (1906–1977, United States)
- Jane Casey (born 1977, Ireland)
- Kathryn Casey (United States)
- Rajorshi Chakraborti (born 1977, India)
- Chan Ho-Kei (born 1975, Hong Kong)
- Jessie Chandler (born 1968, United States)
- Raymond Chandler (1888–1959, United States)
- Vikram Chandra (born 1961, India)
- Kate Charles (born 1950, United States)
- Leslie Charteris (1907–1993, England)
- James Hadley Chase (1906–1985, England)
- G. K. Chesterton (1874–1936, England)
- Lee Child (born 1954, England)
- Chin Shunshin (1924–2015, Taiwan)
- Agatha Christie (1890–1976, England)
- Carol Higgins Clark (1956–2023, United States)
- Mary Higgins Clark (1927–2020, United States)
- Paul Cleave (born 1974, New Zealand)
- Brian Cleeve (1921–2003, England)
- Ann Cleeves (born 1954, England)
- Harlan Coben (born 1962, United States)
- Liza Cody (born 1944, England)
- Max Allan Collins (born 1948, United States)
- Michael Collins (1924–2005, United States)
- Michael Connelly (born 1956, United States)
- John Connolly (born 1968, Ireland)
- Sheila Connolly (1950–2020, United States)
- Robin Cook (born 1940, United States)
- Patricia Cornwell (born 1956, United States)
- Anthony Berkeley Cox (1893–1971, England)
- Philip R. Craig (1933–2007, United States)
- Robert Crais (born 1953, United States)
- John Creasey (1908–1973, England)
- Michael Crichton (1942–2008, United States)
- Catherine Crier (born 1954, United States)
- Edmund Crispin (1921–1978, England)
- Freeman Wills Crofts (1879–1957, Ireland)
- Amanda Cross (1926–2003, United States)
- James Crumley (1939–2008, United States)
- Chris Culver (United States)

== D–F ==
- Jordan Dane (born 1953, United States)
- Diane Mott Davidson (born 1949, United States)
- Carol Anne Davis (born 1961, Scotland)
- Dorothy Salisbury Davis (1916–2014, United States)
- Janet Dawson (born 1949, United States)
- Jeffery Deaver (born 1950, United States)
- Vicki Delany (born 1951, Canada)
- Lester Dent (1904–1959, United States)
- P. T. Deutermann (born 1941, United States)
- William Deverell (born 1937, Canada)
- Colin Dexter (1930–2017, England)
- Ranj Dhaliwal (born 1976/1977, Canada)
- Michael Dibdin (1947–2007, England)
- Eric Jerome Dickey (1961–2021, United States)
- Peter Dickinson (1927–2015, England)
- S. S. Van Dine (1888–1939, United States)
- Doris Miles Disney (1907–1976, United States)
- Stacy Dittrich (born 1973, United States)
- Stephen Dobyns (born 1941, United States)
- R. B. Dominic (United States)
- Tim Dorsey (born 1961, United States)
- John E. Douglas (born 1945, United States)
- Arthur Conan Doyle (1859–1930, Scotland)
- John Dunning (1918–1990, United States)
- Umberto Eco (1932–2016, Italy)
- Edogawa Rampo (1894–1965, Japan)
- Martin Edwards (born 1955, England)
- Åke Edwardson (born 1953, Sweden)
- Mark Ellis (born 1953, Wales)
- James Ellroy (born 1948, United States)
- Sven Elvestad (1884–1934, Norway)
- Loren D. Estleman (born 1952, United States)
- Janet Evanovich (born 1943, United States)
- Stanley Evans (born 1931, Canada)
- Diane Fanning (born 1950, United States)
- Charles Finch (born 1980, United States)
- Paul Finch (England)
- Shamini Flint (born 1969, Malaysia)
- R. Barri Flowers (born 1956, United States)
- Pascale Fonteneau (born 1963, Belgium)
- Dick Francis (1920–2010, Wales)
- Ron Franscell (born 1957, United States)
- Antonia Fraser (born 1932, England)
- Tana French (born 1973, Ireland)
- Kinky Friedman (1944–2024, United States)
- Gayleen Froese (born 1972, Canada)
- Jacques Futrelle (1875–1912, United States)

== G–H ==
- Leighton Gage (1942–2013, United States)
- Stephen Gallagher (born 1954, England)
- Erle Stanley Gardner (1889–1970, United States)
- Gabriella Genisi (born 1965, Italy)
- Anthony Gilbert (1889–1973, England)
- Michael Gilbert (1912–2006, England)
- Kenneth Giles (died 1974, England)
- Steven Gore (United States)
- Ed Gorman (1941–2016, United States)
- Sue Grafton (1940–2017, United States)
- Caroline Graham (born 1931, England)
- Ann Granger (born 1939, England)
- Anna Katharine Green (1846–1935, United States)
- John M. Green (born 1953, Australia)
- Graham Greene (1904–1991, England)
- Bryan Gruley (born 1957, United States)
- Robert van Gulik (1910–1967, Netherlands)
- Elizabeth Gunn (United States)
- Batya Gur (1947–2005, Israel)
- Dashiell Hammett (1894–1961, United States)
- Cyril Hare (1900–1958, England)
- Kent Harrington (United States)
- Margie Harris (fl. 1930s, United States)
- Havank (1904–1964, Netherlands)
- Monika Hausammann (1974, China)
- Mo Hayder (1962–2021, England)
- J. M. Hayes (United States)
- Elizabeth Haynes (England)
- He Jiahong (born 1953, China)
- Tim Heald (1944–2016, England)
- Peter Heck (born 1941, United States)
- Georgette Heyer (1902–1974, England)
- Carl Hiaasen (born 1953, United States)
- Keigo Higashino (born 1958, Japan)
- George V. Higgins (1939–1999, United States)
- Patricia Highsmith (1921–1995, United States)
- Reginald Hill (1936–2012, England)
- Tony Hillerman (1925–2008, United States)
- John Buxton Hilton (1921–1986, England)
- Chester Himes (1909–1984, United States)
- Elisabeth Sanxay Holding (1889–1955, United States)
- Victoria Houston (United States)
- Dorothy B. Hughes (1904–1993, United States)

== I–L ==
- Ibn-e-Safi (1928–1980, Pakistan)
- Francis Iles (1893–1971, England)
- Arnaldur Indriðason (born 1961, Iceland)
- Michael Innes (1906–1994, Scotland)
- Kōtarō Isaka (born 1971, Japan)
- Ira Ishida (born 1960, Japan)
- Shirley Jackson (1916–1965, United States)
- P. D. James (1920–2014, England)
- Peter James (born 1948, England)
- J. A. Jance (born 1944, United States)
- Quintin Jardine (born 1945, Scotland)
- Marshall Jevons (fl. 1970s, United States)
- Bimal Kar (1921–2003, India)
- H. R. F. Keating (1926–2011, England)
- Carolyn Keene (fl. 1970s–1980s, United States)
- Jürgen Kehrer (born 1956, Germany)
- Faye Kellerman (born 1952, United States)
- Jonathan Kellerman (born 1949, United States)
- Harry Kemelman (1908–1996, United States)
- Michael Kenyon (1931–2005, England)
- Simon Kernick (born 1967, England)
- Kim Young-ha (born 1968, South Korea)
- Laurie R. King (born 1952, United States)
- Natsuo Kirino (born 1951, Japan)
- Kenzo Kitakata (born 1947, Japan)
- Kazuhiro Kiuchi (born 1960, Japan)
- Andrew Klavan (born 1954, United States)
- Ronald Knox (1888–1957, England)
- William Kent Krueger (born 1950, United States)
- Natsuhiko Kyogoku (born 1963, Japan)
- Lori L. Lake (born 1960, United States)
- Joe R. Lansdale (born 1951, United States)
- Shulamit Lapid (born 1934, Israel)
- Gaylord Larsen (born 1932, United States)
- Stieg Larsson (1954–2004, Sweden)
- David Lassman (England)
- Emma Lathen (fl. 1960s, United States)
- John le Carré (1931–2020, England)
- Stephen Leather (born 1956, England)
- Vanessa Leggett (born 1968, United States)
- Dennis Lehane (born 1965, United States)
- Anthony Lejeune (1928–2018, England)
- Donna Leon (born 1942, United States)
- Elmore Leonard (1925–2013, United States)
- Gaston Leroux (1868–1927, France)
- Ira Levin (1929–2007, United States)
- Paul Levine (born 1948, United States)
- Ted Lewis (1940–1982, England)
- Laura Lippman (born 1959, United States)
- Steven Long (1944–2022, United States)
- E. C. R. Lorac (1894–1958, England)
- Gabrielle Lord (born 1946, Australia)
- Gayle Lynds (United States)

== M ==
- John D. MacDonald (1916–1986, United States)
- Ross Macdonald (1915–1983, United States)
- Shane Maloney (born 1953, Australia)
- Henning Mankell (1948–2015, Sweden)
- Petros Markaris (born 1937, Greece)
- John Marquand (1893–1960, United States)
- Ngaio Marsh (1895–1982, New Zealand)
- William Marshall (1944–2003, Australia)
- Edward Marston (born 1940, Wales)
- Jan Mårtenson (1933–2026, Sweden)
- Faith Martin (England)
- Seichō Matsumoto (1909–1992, Japan)
- Peter May (born 1951, Scotland)
- Ed McBain (1926–2005, US)
- James H. McClure (1939–2006, England)
- Val McDermid (born 1955, Scotland)
- Dennis McDougal (1947–2025, United States)
- Iain McDowall (Scotland)
- Adrian McKinty (born 1968, Northern Ireland)
- Clive Leo McNeir (England)
- Michele McPhee (born 1970, United States)
- Lee Mellor (born 1982, England)
- Nicholas Meyer (born 1945, United States)
- Milton Scott Michel (1916–1992, United States)
- Margaret Millar (1915–1994, Canada)
- Zygmunt Miłoszewski (born 1976, Poland)
- Denise Mina (born 1966, Scotland)
- Kanae Minato (born 1973, Japan)
- Dreda Say Mitchell (born 1965, England)
- Gladys Mitchell (1901–1983, England)
- Miyuki Miyabe (born 1960, Japan)
- Gwen Moffat (born 1924, England)
- Rick Mofina (Canada)
- Christopher G. Moore (born 1952, Canada)
- David Morrell (born 1943, Canada)
- Mark Morris (born 1963, England)
- John Mortimer (1923–2009, England)
- Patricia Moyes (1923–2000, England)
- Marcia Muller (born 1944, United States)
- Clare Munnings (United States)
- Margaret Murphy (born 1959, England)
- Susan Murphy-Milano (died 2012, United States)

== N–Q ==
- Magdalen Nabb (1947–2007, England)
- Fuminori Nakamura (born 1977, Japan)
- Jo Nesbø (born 1960, Norway)
- Beverley Nichols (1898–1983, England)
- Kyōtarō Nishimura (1930–2022, Japan)
- Asa Nonami (born 1960, Japan)
- Jamyang Norbu (born 1949, Tibet)
- Rintaro Norizuki (born 1964, Japan)
- Malla Nunn (born 1963, Australia)
- Joyce Carol Oates (born 1938, United States)
- Marie O'Connor (born 1974, Ireland)
- Rodica Ojog-Brașoveanu (1939–2002, Romania)
- Kido Okamoto (1872–1939, Japan)
- Celil Oker (1952–2019, Turkey)
- Go Osaka (born 1943, Japan)
- Arimasa Osawa (born 1956, Japan)
- Otsuichi (born 1978, Japan)
- Rodrigues Ottolengui (1861–1937, United States)
- Sara Paretsky (born 1947, United States)
- Edith Pargeter (1913–1995, England)
- Robert B. Parker (1932–2010, United States)
- Surender Mohan Pathak (born 1940, India)
- James Patterson (born 1947, United States)
- Hayford Peirce (1942–2020, United States)
- Don Pendleton (1927–1995, United States)
- Louise Penny (born 1958, Canada)
- Anne Perry (1938–2023, England)
- Ellis Peters (1913–1995, England)
- Mike Phillips (born 1941, British Guiana)
- Scott Phillips (born 1961, United States)
- Edgar Allan Poe (1809–1849, United States)
- Nicholas A. Price (United States)
- Bill Pronzini (born 1943, United States)
- Lisa Pulitzer (born c. 1962, United States)
- Ellery Queen (United States)
- Qiu Xiaolong (born 1953, China)

== R–S ==
- Melanie Raabe (born 1981, Germany)
- Indra Soundar Rajan (1958–2024, India)
- Ian Rankin (born 1960, Scotland)
- Clayton Rawson (1906–1971, United States)
- Satyajit Ray (1921–1992, India)
- Kathy Reichs (born 1948, United States)
- Ruth Rendell (1930–2015, England)
- Osvaldo Reyes (born 1971, Panama)
- Craig Rice (1908–1957, United States)
- Lynda Suzanne Robinson (born 1951, United States)
- Peter Robinson (1950–2022, Canada)
- Elliott Roosevelt (1910–1990, United States)
- Karen Rose (United States)
- Caitlin Rother (born 1962, United States)
- Hemendra Kumar Roy (1888–1963, India)
- S. J. Rozan (born 1950, United States)
- Jane Rubino (United States)
- Ann Rule (1931–2015, United States)
- Craig Russell (Scotland)
- James Sallis (1944–2026, United States)
- C. J. Sansom (1952–2024, Scotland)
- Joh Sasaki (born 1950, Japan)
- Robin Sax (born 1972, United States)
- Dorothy L. Sayers (1893–1957, England)
- Sandra Scoppettone (born 1936, United States)
- Cathy Scott (born 1950s, United States)
- Will Scott (1893–1964, England)
- Lisa Scottoline (born 1955, United States)
- Sōji Shimada (born 1948, Japan)
- John Silvester (Australia)
- Georges Simenon (1903–1989, Belgium)
- Roger L. Simon (born 1943, United States)
- Dorothy Simpson (1933–2020, England)
- Elizabeth Sims (born 1957, United States)
- John Sladek (1937–2000, United States)
- Karin Slaughter (born 1971, United States)
- Aaron Smith (born 1976, United States)
- Alexander McCall Smith (born 1948, Scotland)
- Anthony Neil Smith (United States)
- Joan Smith (born 1953, England)
- Martin Cruz Smith (1942–2025, United States)
- Teresa Solana (born 1962, Spain)
- Mehmet Murat Somer (born 1959, Turkey)
- Suzy Spencer (United States)
- Julia Spencer-Fleming (born 1961, United States)
- Mickey Spillane (1918–2006, United States)
- Nancy Springer (born 1948, United States)
- Rex Stout (1886–1975, United States)
- Linda Stratmann (born 1948, England)
- Cecil Street (1884–1964, Gibraltar)
- Kalpana Swaminathan (born 1956, India)
- Leonie Swann (born 1975, Germany)
- Vikas Swarup (born 1960, India)
- Mitzi Szereto (England)

== T–Z ==
- Akimitsu Takagi (1920–1995, Japan)
- Katsuhiko Takahashi (born 1947, Japan)
- Kazuaki Takano (born 1964, Japan)
- Tetsuo Takashima (born 1949, Japan)
- Andrew Taylor (born 1951, England)
- Josephine Tey (1896–1952, Scotland)
- Johan Theorin (born 1963, Sweden)
- Masako Togawa (1931–2016, Japan)
- M. J. Trow (born 1949, Wales)
- Margaret Truman (1924–2008, United States)
- James Twining (born 1972, England)
- Ahmet Ümit (born 1960, Turkey)
- Lisa Unger (born 1970, United States)
- Arthur Upfield (1890–1964, Australia)
- Andrew Vachss (1942–2021, United States)
- Nury Vittachi (born 1958, Sri Lanka)
- Edgar Wallace (1875–1932, England)
- Lew Wallace (1827–1905, United States)
- Minette Walters (born 1949, England)
- Wang Shuo (born 1958, China)
- Sarah Ward (England)
- Hillary Waugh (1920–2008, United States)
- Betty Webb (United States)
- Charlie Wells (1923–2004, United States)
- Patricia Wentworth (1877–1961, England)
- Jeri Westerson (born 1960, United States)
- Donald E. Westlake (1933–2008, United States)
- Janwillem van de Wetering (1931–2008, Netherlands)
- Ethel Lina White (1876–1944, England)
- Collin Wilcox (1924–1996, United States)
- Charles Willeford (1919–1998, United States)
- Daniel Woodrell (1953–2025, United States)
- Cornell Woolrich (1903–1968, United States)
- Dornford Yates (1885–1960, England)
- Yi Kŭmch'ŏl (North Korea)
- Seishi Yokomizo (1902–1981, Japan)
- Hideo Yokoyama (born 1957, Japan)
- Shuichi Yoshida (born 1968, Japan)
- Yumeno Kyūsaku (1889–1936, Japan)
- Helen Zahavi (born 1966, England)

== See also ==
- Lists of authors
- List of mystery writers
- List of thriller authors
