= List of thriller writers =

Thriller fiction is a genre of fiction with numerous, often overlapping, subgenres, including crime, horror, and detective fiction. Thrillers are characterized and defined by the moods they elicit, giving their audiences heightened feelings of suspense, excitement, surprise, anticipation and anxiety.

== A ==
- Edward S. Aarons
- Christopher Abani
- Jane Adams
- Eric Ambler
- Gosho Aoyama
- Jeffrey Archer
- Campbell Armstrong
- Margaret Atwood

== B ==
- Desmond Bagley
- David Baldacci
- Ashok Banker
- Iain Banks
- Linwood Barclay
- J.D. Barker
- Nevada Barr
- Earle Basinsky
- Brett Battles
- Ted Bell
- Saul Bellow
- Don Bendell
- Kenneth Benton
- William Bernhardt
- Steve Berry
- Charles Bock
- Roberto Bolaño
- Larry Bond
- Jorge Luis Borges
- Sam Bourne
- T. C. Boyle
- Gary Braver
- Andrew Britton
- Dale Brown
- Dan Brown
- Don Brown
- Sandra Brown
- Robert Gregory Browne
- John Buchan
- Christopher Buckley
- William F. Buckley Jr.
- M. L. Buchman
- Joe Buff
- Alafair Burke
- James Lee Burke
- W.R. Burnett
- William S. Burroughs
- Richard Francis Burton
- A. J. Butcher

== C–D ==
- Chelsea Cain
- Tom Cain
- Brian Callison
- Ramsey Campbell
- Stephen J. Cannell
- Victor Canning
- Caleb Carr
- Jack Carr (writer)
- John le Carré
- Leslie Charteris
- Charlie Charters
- James Hadley Chase
- John Cheever
- Lee Child
- Lincoln Child
- Erskine Childers
- Agatha Christie
- Tom Clancy
- Mary Higgins Clark
- Paul Cleave
- Brian Cleeve
- Harlan Coben
- Manning Coles
- Richard Condon
- Michael Connelly
- Joseph Conrad
- Robin Cook
- Stephen Coonts
- Glenn Cooper
- James Fenimore Cooper
- Patricia Cornwell
- Desmond Cory
- Jack Coughlin
- William J. Coughlin
- Harold Coyle
- Joe Craig
- Robert Crais
- Michael Crichton
- Linda Crockett
- Chris Culver
- Charles Cumming
- Clive Cussler
- Brian D'Amato
- Jordan Dane
- Jeffery Deaver
- Len Deighton
- Ted Dekker
- Don DeLillo
- Nelson DeMille
- Alan Dershowitz
- Bill DeSmedt
- P. T. Deutermann
- Graham Diamond
- Philip K. Dick
- William Diehl
- Adam Diment
- Craig Dirgo
- David Docherty
- David Dodge
- Arthur Conan Doyle
- Jack DuBrul
- Alexandre Dumas, père

== E–F ==
- Umberto Eco
- C. M. Eddy, Jr.
- Barry Eisler
- J.T. Ellison
- James Ellroy
- Paul Erdman
- Jeffrey Eugenides
- Janet Evanovich
- Linda Fairstein
- Joseph Finder
- Ian Fleming
- Vince Flynn
- Ken Follett
- Allan Folsom
- Rubem Fonseca
- Frederick Forsyth
- Dick Francis
- Brian Freemantle
- Celia Fremlin
- Nicci French
- Alan Furst
- Frances Fyfield

== G ==
- Leighton Gage
- Stephen Gallagher
- Meg Gardiner
- John Gardner
- William Garner
- Tess Gerritsen
- William Gibson
- Michael Gilbert
- Anton Gill
- Robert Goddard
- Steven Gore
- Juan Gómez-Jurado
- Sue Grafton
- Heather Graham
- Winston Graham
- Andrew Grant
- Andrew Greeley
- John M. Green
- Graham Greene
- W.E.B. Griffin
- James Grippando
- John Grisham
- Michael Gruber
- Sara Gruen
- Jan Guillou
- Elizabeth Gunn
- Andrei Gusev

== H ==
- H. Rider Haggard
- Brian Haig
- Adam Hall
- Donald Hamilton
- Nick Harkaway
- John Harris
- Robert Harris
- Thomas Harris
- A.J. Hartley
- Rakib Hasan
- Monika Hausammann
- John Twelve Hawks
- Mo Hayder
- J.M. Hayes
- Victor Heck
- Joseph Heller
- Zoë Heller
- Carl Hiaasen
- Jack Higgins
- Patricia Highsmith
- Charlie Higson
- Raelynn Hillhouse
- Tami Hoag
- Elisabeth Sanxay Holding
- Homer
- Anthony Horowitz
- Geoffrey Household
- Dorothy B. Hughes
- E. Howard Hunt
- Gwen Hunter
- Jack D. Hunter
- Stephen Hunter
- Gregg Hurwitz
- Qazi Anwar Hussain
- James Huston

== I–J ==
- David Ignatius
- Greg Iles
- Hammond Innes
- Ian Irvine
- Alan Jacobson
- PD James
- Steven James
- Geoffrey Jenkins
- Jerry B. Jenkins

== K–L ==
- Joseph Kanon
- John Katzenbach
- Alex Kava
- Faye Kellerman
- Jesse Kellerman
- Jonathan Kellerman
- Lauren Kelly
- Simon Kernick
- Philip Kerr
- Alexander Key
- Raymond Khoury
- Laurie R. King
- Stephen King
- Rudyard Kipling
- Fletcher Knebel
- Dean Koontz
- Tim Krabbé
- Ken Kuhlken
- Ross Laidlaw
- Lori L. Lake
- Jon Land
- Stieg Larsson*Anthony Price
- William Lashner
- John le Carré
- William Le Queux
- Stephen Leather
- Harper Lee
- Dennis Lehane
- Elmore Leonard
- Gaston Leroux
- John Lescroart
- Paul Levine
- S. E. Lister
- Robert Littell
- Robert Ludlum
- Gavin Lyall
- Gayle Lynds

== M–N ==
- Jonathan Maberry
- John D. MacDonald
- Helen MacInnes
- Ian Mackintosh
- Alistair MacLean
- Norman Mailer
- Richard Marcinko
- Phillip Margolin
- George Markstein
- Stephen Marley
- Ngaio Marsh
- Faith Martin
- Somerset Maugham
- Peter May
- Ed McBain
- Charles McCarry
- Val McDermid
- Andy McDermott
- Andy McNab
- H. C. McNeile (Sapper)
- Brad Meltzer
- Deon Meyer
- Alex Michaelides
- Margaret Millar
- Mark Mills
- Zygmunt Miłoszewski
- Rick Mofina
- Aly Monroe
- Brian Moore (also under the pseudonyms Michael Bryan and Bernard Mara)
- David Morrell
- John Mortimer
- Robert Muchamore
- Marcia Muller
- James Munro
- Margaret Murphy
- Thomas F. Murphy
- Michael Nava
- Christopher Nicole
- Audrey Niffenegger
- Ingrid Noll
- Oliver North

== O–P ==
- Manning O'Brine
- T. Lynn Ocean
- Michael Ondaatje
- E. Phillips Oppenheim
- Baroness Orczy
- Perri O'Shaughnessy
- Sara Paretsky
- Michael Parker
- James Patterson
- Richard North Patterson
- Stel Pavlou
- Matthew Pearl
- Ridley Pearson
- Kira Peikoff
- Hayford Peirce
- Don Pendleton
- Thomas Perry
- Ralph Peters
- James Phelan
- Christopher Pike
- Edgar Allan Poe
- Henry Porter
- Douglas Preston
- Anthony Price
- Christopher Priest
- Mario Puzo

== Q ==
- A J Quinnell

== R ==
- Ron Rash
- Ishmael Reed
- Christopher Reich
- Kathy Reichs
- Matthew Reilly
- Ruth Rendell
- Osvaldo Reyes
- Stella Rimington
- J.D. Robb
- Jeremy Robinson
- Kim Stanley Robinson
- Patrick Robinson
- James Rollins
- Santiago Roncagliolo
- Nancy Taylor Rosenberg
- David Rosenfelt
- Judith Rossner
- M. A. Rothman
- J. K. Rowling
- Greg Rucka
- Craig Russell
- Eric Frank Russell
- Chris Ryan
- Vladimir Rybakov

== S ==
- Riley Sager
- Lawrence Sanders
- John Sandford
- John Saul
- Dorothy L. Sayers
- Arthur Schnitzler
- Lisa Scottoline
- Yulian Semyonov
- Gerald Seymour
- A. T. M. Shamsuddin
- Robert Shea
- Sidney Sheldon
- Jenny Siler
- Daniel Silva
- Elizabeth Sims
- Desmond Skirrow
- Karin Slaughter
- Martin Cruz Smith
- Rosamond Smith
- Mickey Spillane
- Jason Starr
- Peter Steiner
- Olen Steinhauer
- Neal Stephenson
- Brooke Stevens
- Robert Louis Stevenson
- R.L. Stine
- S. M. Stirling
- Jon Stock
- Bram Stoker
- Nick Stone
- Paul Sussman

== T–W ==
- Robert K. Tanenbaum
- Bernard J. Taylor
- Ron Terpening
- Josephine Tey
- James Thayer
- Craig Thomas
- Ross Thomas
- Brad Thor
- Guillermo del Toro
- Peter Townend
- Arthur Train
- Scott Turow
- James Twining
- Lisa Unger
- Andrew Vachss
- Eric Van Lustbader
- Abraham Verghese
- Jules Verne
- Barbara Vine
- Vyasa
- Edgar Wallace
- Irving Wallace
- Minette Walters
- Charlie Wells
- Morris West
- Jeri Westerson
- Donald Westlake (pseudonyms include Richard Stark)
- Dennis Wheatley
- Lionel White
- Michael White
- Stephen White
- Kate Wilhelm
- Alan Williams
- F. Paul Wilson
- Robert Anton Wilson
- John Wray

== Y–Z ==
- Dornford Yates
- Yi Kŭmch'ŏl
- Helen Zahavi

== See also ==
- Thriller fiction
- Spy fiction
- List of crime writers
- List of mystery writers
