= Women in Crime Ink =

'Women in Crime Ink'
- First issue: 2008; 17 years ago
- Country: United States
- Language: English
- Website: www.womenincrimeink.com

Women in Crime Ink is an American daily crime blog that publishes both original and aggregated content. The blog was founded on March 10, 2008, as "a well of thoughts on crime and media issues from women criminal justice professionals and authors". The site offers original content and coverage of crime, media, books, literature, high-profile criminal cases and crime news.

== Contributors ==
Women in Crime Ink has featured commentary and analyses of crime and media events by journalists, criminal justice professionals and TV personalities, including: Pulitzer Prize-winning science journalist and author Deborah Blum; legal analyst Anne Bremner; criminal profiler Pat Brown; forensics specialist Andrea Campbell; true crime author and novelist Kathryn Casey; Emmy award-winning TV news magazine producer Lisa R. Cohen; TV journalist and host Diane Dimond; former police officer and commentator Stacy Dittrich; true crime author and mystery novelist Diane Fanning; legal analyst Susan Filan; body language expert Dr. Lillian Glass; clinical psychologist and author Michelle Golland; former prosecutor Holly Hughes; crime analyst Sheryl McCollum; prosecutor Donna Pendergast; author and professor of forensic psychology Katherine Ramsland; author, former prosecutor and TV legal analyst Robin Sax; criminal defense attorney Katherine Scardino; true crime author and journalist Cathy Scott; newswoman Michelle Sigona; psychotherapist and anger counselor Gina Simmons Schneider; and investigative specialist Donna Weaver.

== History ==
Of the six original founders — including Vanessa Leggett, a writer jailed by the U.S. Justice Department for 168 days for choosing to protect sources and notes for a book about murder victim Doris Angleton — three remain: Brown, Pendergast and Weaver.

In June 2009, editor Becky Bright with The Wall Street Journal called Women in Crime Ink "a blog worth reading". And National Public Radio's host Ira Flatow discussed the blog on the air in May 2010 with Deborah Blum. The Bishop Accountability organization cited as well as reprinted a 2008 Women in Crime Ink article about Reverend Gilbert Gauthe and the sexual abuse scandal in the Catholic diocese of Savannah.

In May 2010, the social networking blog Betty Confidential republished a "Women in Crime Ink" post written by Kathryn Casey about the beating death of University of Virginia lacrosse player Yeardley Love. The blog was also cited in 2008 in an LA Weekly blog for a prison story involving Susan Atkins, a Manson follower.

In 2008, Scared Monkeys Radio's The Dana Pretzer Show hosted a "Women in Crime" edition featuring "The Ladies of Women in Crime Ink."
