= Elliott Furniture Company =

- U.S. National Register of Historic Places
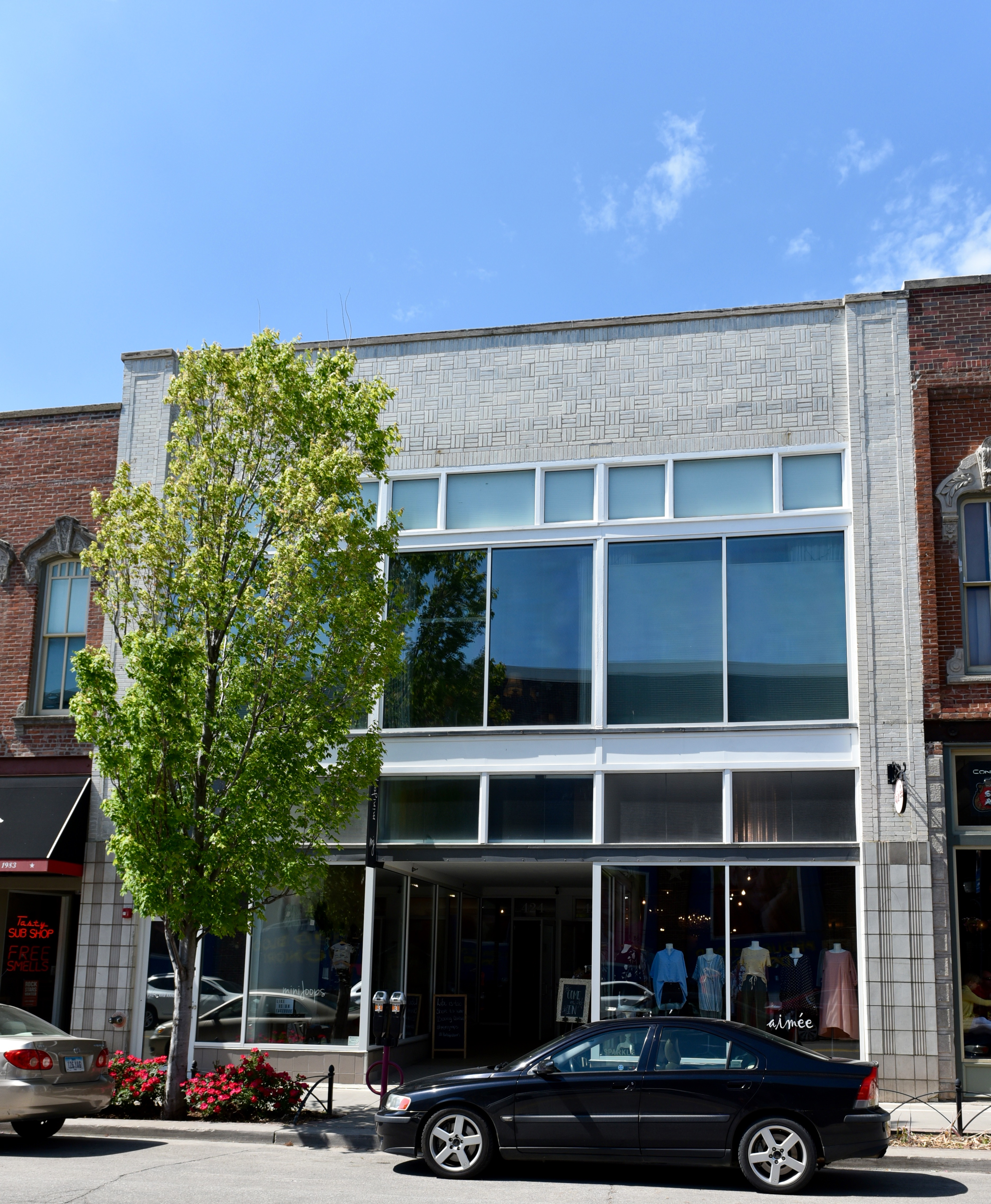

- Location within Iowa Location within the United States
- Location: 424 E. Locust St. Des Moines, Iowa
- Coordinates: 41°35′23.2″N 93°36′42.3″W
- Area: less than one acre
- Built: 1891, 1940
- Architectural style: Streamline Moderne
- NRHP reference No.: 14001149
- Added to NRHP: January 14, 2015

Elliott Furniture Company is a historic building located in Des Moines, Iowa, United States. It was built in 1891 in the Italianate style for Gustav Newlen, who was an undertaker and cabinet maker. Eight years later the Elliott family acquired the building and combined the two storefronts into a unified façade for the Elliott Anderson Furniture Company. The building was extensively renovated in 1936 with the installation of large display windows on both floors, undoing the 1899 renovations. Four years later saw another renovation with the addition of glazed brick and fluted Terra Cotta pilasters. This gave the building an Art Moderne appearance. The building was listed on the National Register of Historic Places in 2015.
