= Scare-line =

Emphasized quote or headline to scare the reader

A scare-line, scare-head, or scare headline is a word or phrase that is presented—often as a quotation and as a headline or other emphasized text, such as a pull quote—to scare the reader, as part of a smear campaign against an opposing political candidate, or to cause an estrangement or cause something to seem unfamiliar in a supernatural way. The term scare quote is sometimes also used to refer to scare-lines that are direct quotations, but more often refers today to use of dismissive quotation marks around a term to imply doubt, irony, or scorn.

== Origin of the terms ==
The terms scare-line and scare-head derive from scare + headline; the longer name scare headline has sometimes been used. The Oxford English Dictionary notes the use of the shorter expressions scare-line and scare-head, the latter as early as 1887. The use of scare quote in the same sense dates back to at least 1946. According to FishBase, the term scare line also refers to "a means of directing fish towards the main, holding part of a net by frightening the fish into movement".

== In newspaper journalism ==
Scare-lining increases newspaper sales predictably, and this has been known for several generations. Upton Sinclair wrote in The Brass Check: "I knew for instance, sitting at my desk, just how many extra papers I could sell with a scare-line on a police scandal." He also criticized it as manipulative and of questionable journalistic integrity.

== In modern women's magazines ==
According to Myrna Blyth, a feminist, media critic, and former editor-in-chief of Ladies' Home Journal, women's magazines, especially from the early 1990s onward, have published an increasing number of what she calls scare stories about health, most often using alarming headlines and call-out or billboard text that are not quotations. For example, Glamour magazine in the year 1990 had no health cover stories, but in 2002 had at least one scare-line in almost most issues, e.g. "It's Common, It Can Kill: Why Aren't Doctors Telling Us about This Women-only Disease?" from the April 2002 issue. Blyth characterizes this as a trend of selling of unhappiness and fear about health.

Two thirds of the articles reviewed in the [one-year] study never mentioned that the actual risks from any of these threats were extremely small, and even more important, that the alarmist views in many of the articles actually disagreed with mainstream science.

What women's magazines really specialize in are stories that make you afraid to cross the threshold of a hospital, trust your doctor, or take your medicine. In looking at ten years of cover lines...one can see a dramatic acceleration of bad-doctor stories during the 1990s.

Women's magazines also package fear...by "exposing" frightening and imminent threats to women, especially when it comes to health. Our survey of women's magazines found that when it comes to scare stories, the least substantiated ones were about health. In fact, over the three years' worth of stories we reviewed, 258 health stories about everything from food contamination to mercury poisoning to rare diseases earned space in America's magazines for women—many overly dependent on anecdotal evidence and devoid of any valid risk assessment. Often, a hint of conspiracy was added ("10 Urgent Health Risks Doctors Don't Tell You About") to ratchet up the fear factor...

She concludes that women acting as the effective gatekeepers of family health is the reason they have been increasingly targeted by this sort of writing and marketing, often based on "confusing, junk-science statistics" and the replacement of rigorous reporting with personal opinion and vague, exaggeratory implications with much wiggle room. According to Blyth, such articles also appear to be the leading source of vaccine hesitancy (e.g., the debunked but persistent idea that childhood vaccination causes autism). Blyth says that her former publication also ran such scare-lines, such as "Dangerous Medicine: When Cures Harm Instead of Heal", and "Foods that Can Kill".

== See also ==
- Fearmongering – Deliberate use of fear-based tactics
- Persuasive writing – Technique used to convince a reader
- Scare quotes – Quotation marks used to indicate non-standard usage
- Yellow journalism – Sensationalistic news
