= Grey Pilgrim =

Grey Pilgrim might refer to one of the following:

- A name for Gandalf, a fictional character in J. R. R. Tolkien's The Lord of the Rings series
- "The Grey Pilgrim," a book by J. M. Hayes
