= Lăzărescu =

Lăzărescu is a Romanian surname. Notable people with the surname include:

- Cezar Lăzărescu (1923−1986), architect and urban planner
- Marian Lăzărescu (born 1984), luger
- Nae Lăzărescu (1941−2013), actor and comedian
- Mr. Lazarescu, title character of the 2005 film The Death of Mr. Lazarescu
