= Susan Murphy-Milano =

- Born: Susan Murphy; 1959/1960; Chicago, Illinois, U.S.
- Died: October 28, 2012 (aged 52); Folly Beach, South Carolina, U.S.
- Occupations: Author, radio host, victims advocate
- Writing career
- Genres: Nonfiction, radio
- Subjects: Domestic violence, true crime
- Notable works: Time's Up; Moving Out, Moving On
- Notable awards: Women's Hall of Fame; Public Citizen of the Year; Women with Vision

Susan Murphy-Milano (1959/1960 — October 28, 2012) was an American nonfiction author, violence expert and host of the weekly radio crime show "Time's Up" and author of a book by the same title. Murphy-Milano died in Surfside Beach, South Carolina, in 2012, aged 52, from cancer.

== Early life and education ==
Murphy-Milano was born in Chicago, Illinois to parents Roberta and Phillip Murphy, a police officer. She graduated from William Howard Taft High School. She attended the University of Chicago from 1978 to 1981.

In January 1989, her father, a decorated Chicago Police violent crimes investigator, murdered his wife, her mother, Roberta, using his service weapon, a .44 magnum. He then committed suicide by shooting himself in the head.

== Career ==
Murphy-Milano, who discovered her parents' bodies, vowed to change the way intimate partner crimes and homicides were handled and investigated. She spent her career advocating for women and child victims of domestic violence. A women's advocate, she lobbied for the passage of 1993's Illinois Stalking Law and the Lautenberg Amendment of 1996, a domestic violence offender gun ban.

Murphy-Milano authored Defending Our Lives: Getting Away From Domestic Violence & Staying Safe, published by Doubleday, released in September 1996 to coincide with National Domestic Violence Awareness Month.

Her second book, Moving Out, Moving On, focused on when a relationship goes wrong. Her latest book, released by the publishing on demand publisher Dog Ear Press in 2010, is Times Up: A Guide on How to Leave and Survive Abusive and Stalking Relationships. Author and former prosecutor Robin Sax, in a review for Psychology Today, wrote about the Evidentiary Abuse Affidavit included in the book. "Murphy Milano reaches out and offers her hand -- with a key (almost literally). Thank you to Murphy-Milano for giving us ... a succinct, well-written guidebook that is a must-have for anyone who is a victim or who works with victims of domestic abuse." As of June 2012, WorldCat shows the book to be present in 13 libraries.

She appeared on network TV and talk shows, including The Oprah Winfrey Show, 20/20, American Justice, Larry King Live, Sunday Today, E! True Hollywood, MSNBC, CBS, ABC, and CNN. She regularly appeared on The Roth Show, a syndicated show on the USA Radio Network, hosted by Dr. Laurie Roth, and was a regular contributor to TRUE CRIME UNCENSORED, hosted by Burl Barer.

She was a contributing writer for Women in Crime Ink, which the Wall Street Journal called "a blog worth reading."

Murphy-Milano often spoke to law enforcement, at schools and before groups advocating victims' rights. Also, she worked with the Institute for Relational Harm Reduction and Public Pathology Education.

Her biography, Holding My Hand Through Hell, released by Ice Cube Press in October 2012, shortly before her death.

== Awards ==
- Women with Vision award for Community Service (The Women's Bar Association of Illinois), 1997
- Women's Hall of Fame (City of Chicago), inducted in 1999
- Public Citizen of the Year Award (National Association of Social Workers Illinois Chapter)
