= Stacy Dittrich =

American novelist

- Born: March 2, 1973 (age 53); Ohio, United States
- Occupations: Author, former police detective
- Writing career
- Genre: True crime
- Subject: Crime
- Notable work: Stumbling Along the Beat
- Website: www.stacydittrich.com

Stacy Dittrich (born March 2, 1973), a former police detective from Ohio, is an American mystery novelist and true crime author.

== Career ==
Dittrich, a graduate of Lexington High School, retired from the Richland County Sheriff's Department in Mansfield, Ohio, in 2008. She began her police career as a dispatcher in 1992 and became a deputy in 1996, after being exposed to law enforcement by her father and three uncles, who were police officers. In 1997, The Mansfield News Journal printed a two-page feature article about Dittrich and her retired father titled "Like Father, Like Daughter: The Beat Goes On."

In 2002, Dittrich received the Victims of Crime Award from the Ohio attorney general. In 2009, she received a commendation from Ohio State Rep. Margaret Ann Ruhl for her writing achievements.

Dittrich is a regular contributor to Women in Crime Ink, She co-hosted a weekly radio show, "Justice Interrupted," with former Los Angeles County prosecutor Robin Sax.

Her book, Murder Behind the Badge, includes the cases of former police officer Antoinette Frank's killings in New Orleans; Bobby Cutts Jr., who murdered his pregnant former girlfriend; California Highway Patrol Trooper Craig Peyer, who pulled over San Diego State University college student Cara Knott, then murdered her; Columbia, Missouri, officer Steven Rios, who slit the throat of his gay lover; and former police sergeant Drew Peterson and the case of his missing wife.

In November 2010, The Fremantle Corporation entered into a television option for a crime drama based on Dittrich's CeeCee Gallagher novel series.

== Appearances ==
Dittrich has appeared on CNN, the "Nancy Grace Show," HLN, CBS' "48 Hours," FOX's "The O'Reilly Factor," and "Geraldo At Large." She also appeared on E! True Hollywood to talk about the Michael Jackson death investigation.

She also regularly speaks across the country about domestic violence on behalf of an awareness group founded by Denise Brown, whose sister, Nicole Brown Simpson, was murdered in 1994.

In 2009, she appeared on an HLN panel, titled "Cops After Those Who Helped Alleged Killer," on "Issues with Jane Velez-Mitchell." In 2008, Scared Monkeys Radio's "The Dana Pretzer Show" hosted Dittrich, along with two other true crime authors, as "the ladies of Women in Crime Ink." She also made regular appearances as a commentator on "The Dana Pretzer Show" in 2009 and 2010.

== Books ==
=== Nonfiction ===
- Murder Behind the Badge: True Stories of Cops Who Kill (2009), Prometheus Books
- Stumbling Along the Beat (2010), Kaplan Publishing
- Searching for Sandra: The Story Behind the Disappearance of Sandra Cantu (2013), Crime Street Press

=== Fiction ===
- The CeeCee Gallagher Series (Dorchester Publishing)

==== CeeCee Gallagher titles ====
- The Devil's Closet (2008)
- Mary Jane's Grave (2009)
- Murder Mountain (2010)
- The Body Mafia (2010)
- The Rapture of Omega (2010)
