= Sarah Polonsky =

Canadian-American journalist

Sarah Polonsky is a Canadian-American journalist and editor who specializes in media and music. Known as the "global voice of dance music," she spearheaded and served as Chief Editor of the North American division of DJ Magazine. During her tenure there, she launched the Best of North America Awards as the sister event to the UK iteration, Best of British. She previously oversaw an electronic music magazine called Elektro as the title's managing editor. She was a Senior Editor of the online magazine BettyConfidential and at Vibe. Polonsky was also a reporter at the National Enquirer before accepting a position at Page Six at the New York Post. There is a questionable dispute regarding a position at Page Six which ended when Polonsky was fired after a story in Radar Online criticized her for accepting freebies. Although this practice was standard at the time and untrue as the real cause for dismissal.
