= Gina Simmons Schneider =

American therapist, author, and writer

- Education: San Diego State University; United States International University
- Occupations: Marriage and family counselor Author, writer, educator
- Spouse: Jay Schneider
- Website: Manage Anger Daily

Gina Simmons Schneider is a marriage and family counselor, author, blogger and educator from San Diego, California, specializing in anger management.

== Early life and education ==
Simmons Schneider received a bachelor's degree in psychology in 1983 from San Diego State University. In 1991, she received a doctorate degree in psychology from United States International University.

== Career ==
Simmons Schneider has been licensed in California as a marriage and family therapist since 1988. From 1987 to 1988, Simmons Schneider was licensed in California as a marriage and family therapist intern. She is co-founder and co-director of Schneider Family Services with her husband, Jay Schneider, a licensed clinical social worker.

She was an adjunct instructor in the psychology department at San Diego City College.

She has been quoted in articles about anger management, including in the New York Times, the Los Angeles Times and the San Diego Union-Tribune. She was profiled in a Q&A piece on Yahoo! Voices in 2010. In December 2011, she appeared on "The Roth Show," a syndicated radio program.

=== Book ===
Simmons Schneider wrote the nonfiction book Frazzlebrain: Break Free from Anxiety, Anger, and Stress Using Advanced Discoveries in Neuropsychology, released by Central Recovery Press in 2022, the cover of which includes a caricature image of a frazzled brain. Clinical Psychologist Michael Alcee, in a Psychology Today piece, called the book an "evocative title to get at the unique mix of stress, anger, and anxiety that plagues us all," and wrote that the "book finds refreshingly new ways of understanding and resolving these issues that have been with us since the beginning of time."

=== Writings ===
Simmons Schneider is a contributing blogger for Psychology Today. Previously she blogged for Forbes.com and blogged for Women in Crime Ink. She was a columnist for Living Better Magazine, answering health-related questions.

An article she wrote about media violence and aggression in children was included in the anthology Is Media Violence a Problem? (vol. 2), released by Cengage Learning in May 2010.

A short story by Simmons Schneider is included in the book Heart of a Military Woman: Stories and Tributes to Those Who Serve Our Country, released in 2009 in the Heart Book Series collection by author Sheryl Roush.

== Personal life ==
In 1972 as a teenager, Simmons Schneider sang on the rock musical album An Eye In Each Head, performing in the live production of the same name. In 1994, she sang lead on the album Help The People by Paul Swigart, and background vocals in seven of the songs.
