= Bob Andelman =

American writer (1960–2020)

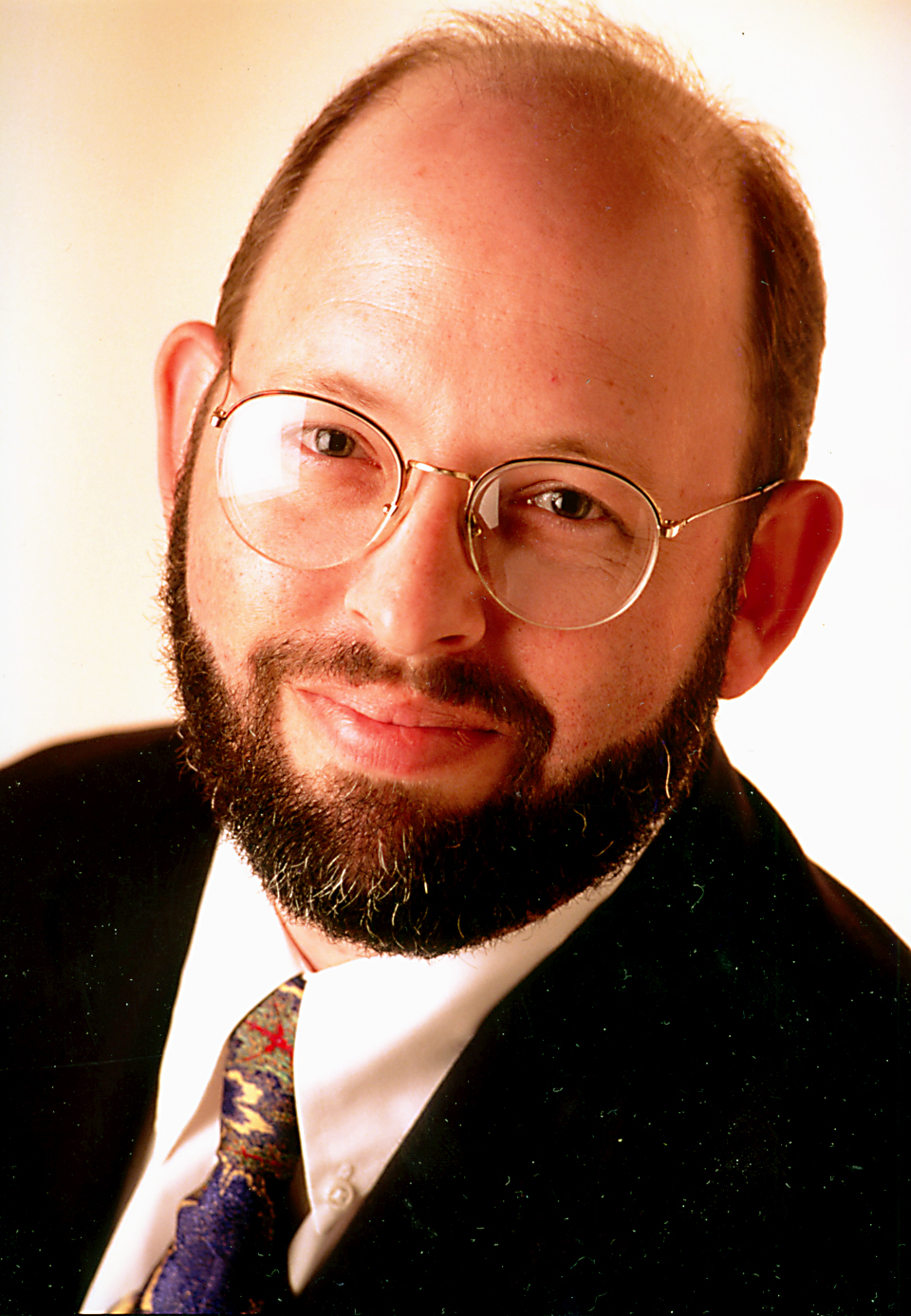
- Born: October 9, 1960; North Brunswick, New Jersey, U.S.
- Died: February 24, 2020 (aged 59)
- Occupations: Writer, podcaster
- Years active: 2005–2020
- Spouse: Mimi Andelman (m. 1988)
- Children: 1

Bob Andelman (October 9, 1960 – February 24, 2020) was a writer and podcaster. Andelman was the author or co-author of many books about business, culture, and the arts, and produced interviews with figures in popular culture as "Mr. Media".

Andelman authored Will Eisner: A Spirited Life for the M Press imprint of Dark Horse Comics. Based on some of the final interviews with Eisner and with an introduction by Michael Chabon, the book was published on November 2, 2005.

Andelman collaborated with various business leaders in writing books including company profiles and strategy handbooks. These include Built From Scratch: How A Couple of Regular Guys Grew the Home Depot From Nothing to $30 Billion, with the founders of Home Depot, and The Profit Zone: How Strategic Business Design Will Lead You To Tomorrow’s Profits with Adrian J. Slywotzky and David J. Morrison.

Andelman founded the Mr. Media website in 1995. The website currently features a variety of interviews of media and entertainment figures by Andelman.

== Recognition ==
Andelman was recognized as one of the Talkers Magazine's "Frontier Fifty: A Selection of Outstanding Talk Media Webcasters," in both 2010 and 2011.

== Personal life ==
Andelman's hometown was North Brunswick, New Jersey, from a Jewish family, After graduating from North Brunswick Township High School, he attended the University of Florida College of Liberal Arts and Sciences. He lived in the Tampa Bay area since 1982. Since 1988, he was married to Mimi Andelman, a journalist at the Tampa Bay Times. They had one child, Charlie.

Andelman died on February 24, 2020, from adenoid cystic carcinoma.

== Selected books ==
- Why Men Watch Football, Acadian House Publishing, 1993, ISBN 0925417149
- Will Eisner: A Spirited Life, M Press, 2005, ISBN 1595820116

As co-author

- Albert J. Dunlap with Bob Andelman, Mean Business: How I Save Bad Companies and Make Good Companies Great, Crown Business, 1996, ISBN 0812928377
- Adrian J. Slywotzky and David J. Morrison with Bob Andelman, The Profit Zone: How Strategic Business Design Will Lead You to Tomorrow's Profits. Crown Business, 1997, ISBN 0812929004
- Bernie Marcus and Arthur Blank with Bob Andelman, Built from Scratch: How A Couple of Regular Guys Grew the Home Depot From Nothing to $30 Billion. Crown Business, 1999, ISBN 0812930584
- Howard Stoeckel with Bob Andelman, The Wawa Way: How a Funny Name and Six Core Values Revolutionized Convenience. Running Press, 2014, ISBN 0762453060
- Herman J. Russell with Bob Andelman, Building Atlanta: How I Broke Through Segregation to Launch a Business Empire Chicago Review Press, 2014, ISBN 1613746946
- Pat Brown with Bob Andelman, The Profiler: My Life Hunting Serial Killers and Psychopaths, Hyperion Books, 2010, ISBN 978-1401341268
