= Anne Bremner =

American lawyer

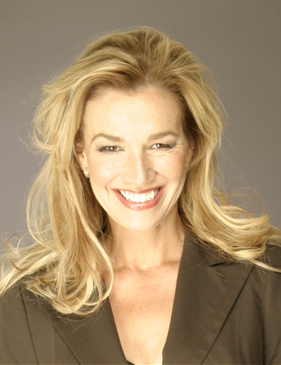
- Professional headshot of Bremner in 2008
- Born: Anne Melani Bremner; June 4, 1958 (age 68); McAlester, Oklahoma, U.S.
- Education: Stanford University (BA); Seattle University (JD)

Anne Melani Bremner (born June 4, 1958) is an American attorney and television personality. She has been a television commentator on a number of high-profile cases, including in the murder of Meredith Kercher in Italy as legal counsel and as a spokesperson for the Friends of Amanda Knox.

== Early life and education ==
Bremner was born in McAlester, Oklahoma. Bremner attended Stanford University, where she studied medieval history, graduating in 1980 with honors. She describes her student self as "a liberal, an idealist, and a Democrat" who was opposed to capital punishment. She went on to Seattle University School of Law, where she completed her J.D. degree in 1982.

== Career ==
=== Prosecutor ===
From 1983 to 1988, Bremner was a deputy prosecuting attorney with the criminal division of the King County Prosecuting Attorney's Office, specializing in sex crimes.

During these years she came into contact with a number of high-profile cases, such as the Wah Mee massacre trials. The experience, along with those later in her career, began to modulate her views on the death penalty, which she had always staunchly opposed.

In 1985, she was deputy prosecuting attorney in a case against a University of Washington police officer believed to be the first person to be charged under the state's new computer trespass law. A trial court convicted the officer of the charges, but the Washington Court of Appeals overturned his conviction.

=== Private practice ===
Bremner worked as a lawyer at Stafford Frey Cooper in Seattle from 1988 to 2012. During her career in private practice, Bremner represented law enforcement and judges in various civil and criminal cases. In 1996, she successfully defended the Seattle Police Department's use of police dogs to find and bite suspects against an American Civil Liberties Union (ACLU) challenge claiming that it violated suspects' civil rights and constituted excessive force.

In 2001, she represented the Bellevue Police Department during the inquest into the conduct of officer Mike Hetle during his second fatal shooting that year; the jury found that Metle had reason to fear death or serious bodily harm.

In the 2002 case Vili Fualaau v. Highline School District and the Des Moines Police Department, filed by the family of Mary Kay Letourneau's student Vili Fualaau, Bremner successfully defended the police department against liability for damages. She became acquainted with Letourneau during the course of the lawsuit; the two would develop a friendship.

=== Media attention ===
Bremner appears on television as a legal analyst, explaining prominent cases to the general public. In 2004, she appeared on Court TV and other cable networks covering the trial of Scott Peterson for the murder of Laci Peterson. Similarly in 2005, she took an unpaid leave of absence from her job to offer television commentary on People v. Jackson, stating that the publicity had brought in millions of dollars of business for her firm. In 2009, she appeared variously on CNN with Nancy Grace to discuss the Casey Anthony case.

In October 2008, Bremner took up the cause of Amanda Knox, a University of Washington student charged with the murder of Meredith Kercher in Perugia, Italy. She was contacted by family members of Knox's classmates, including Mike Heavey, a superior court judge with whom she was previously acquainted. The group subsequently held fundraisers to pay for Knox's defense, lobby lawmakers, and conduct public relations activities, turning media focus toward the conduct of the prosecution, especially Perugia chief prosecutor Giuliano Mignini. Bremner made various television appearances regarding the case, describing Knox as "naive" and comparing her to the title character in the French film Amélie.

She represents the parents of Susan Powell, a Wells Fargo employee who went missing in Utah in 2009, in their lawsuit for insurance money. The lawsuit ended in a settlement in March 2015.

In 2011, Bremner was hired by family of Rebecca Zahau Nalepa, a woman who committed suicide after being present in a house during an incident where her boyfriend's young son died. Bremner, representing Zahau's family, sued the deceased boy's parents, Jonah and Dina Shacknai, claiming that Zahau had been murdered, contrary to the conclusion of the police investigation which ruled Zahau's death a suicide with no foul play. Bremner went on many television shows and made statements such as, "this doesn't pass the smell test" and claimed that "This would be the first case in the history of the world that a woman killed herself like this ... It's ridiculous on the face of it"; however, officials said that the way Zahau killed herself is "not unprecedented and there is no evidence that there was foul play".

In 2013–2014, Bremner represented true crime author Ann Rule in a defamation suit against Seattle Weekly and lost. The state Supreme Court reversed a matter that reinstated Ann Rule's case.

Bremner represented Chuck and Judy Cox, the parents of Susan Cox Powell, in a wrongful-death lawsuit against the Washington State Department of Social and Health Services over the deaths of their grandsons. The jury awarded a verdict of $98.5 million, which was reduced by the trial court, and then reinstated by the Washington Court of Appeals in 2023.

=== Other activities ===
In 2003, Bremner was one of the founding members of the Committee for a Two-Newspaper Town, along with Washington Supreme Court justice Phil Talmadge. The group was formed to pressure the Hearst Corporation and The Seattle Times Company to continue printing their respective newspapers, the Seattle Post-Intelligencer and The Seattle Times, under their joint operating agreement signed in 1982. The group specifically opposed an attempt by the Times to dissolve the JOA and permit Hearst to close the Post-Intelligencer in exchange for 32% of the Times' profits for 80 years. However, in March 2009, the Post-Intelligencer printed its last paper edition and moved to an online-only format. In an e-mail about the event, Bremner stated: "What a terribly sad day this is. Only tomorrow will be worse." Bremner was a regular contributor to Women in Crime Ink, which the Wall Street Journal called "a blog worth reading."

== Personal life ==
On June 3, 2010, Bremner had automobile difficulties and called 9-1-1. A county sheriff suspected she was intoxicated and arrested her. She pleaded guilty to DUI on September 1 and was sentenced to two days in jail.
