= Lillian Glass =

American writer

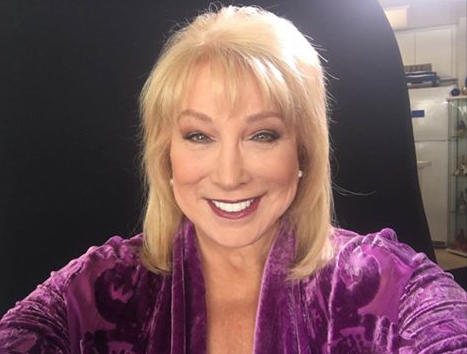
- Glass in August 2018

Personal details
- Born: Miami, Florida, U.S.
- Education: Bradley University; University of Michigan; UCLA School of Medicine; University of Minnesota; Pepperdine University
- Occupation: Interpersonal communication and body language expert Media commentator Litigation consultant
- Website: http://www.drlillianglass.com/

Lillian Glass is an American interpersonal communication and body language expert, media commentator, self-help books author and film director and producer.

== Early life and education ==
Lillian Glass was born and raised in Miami, Florida, the daughter of businessman Abraham Glass and Rosalee Glass (née Talerman), an interior decorator and actress. Glass graduated from Coral Gables Senior High School and was inducted into the "Coral Gables Senior High School Hall of Fame" in 2023.

Glass received a Bachelor of Science degree from Bradley University in speech and hearing sciences, where she was named one of Glamour Magazine's "Top 10 College Girls". She earned her Master of Science from the University of Michigan, where she became interested in gender differences in communication and the study of cranial and dental-facial abnormalities.

She received a doctorate degree from the University of Minnesota and was awarded a Bush Foundation fellowship. She majored in communication disorders, with an emphasis on speech and hearing sciences, and minored in clinical genetics. Her doctoral dissertation focused on "Psychosocial Perceptions of Speech and Cosmetic Appearance of Patients with Craniofacial Abnormalities". She received a post-doctorate in medical genetics at UCLA School of Medicine. She and medical geneticist Robert J. Gorlin discovered a new syndrome, Glass Gorlin Syndrome, which was named after them.

== Career ==
=== Academia ===
Glass became an associate professor at the University of Southern California (USC). She held joint appointments with the school of medicine, department of medical genetics, school of dentistry and department of speech communication. She was a researcher at the University of Southern California Speech Research Lab.

=== Private practice ===
Glass began her private practice in Beverly Hills, California, treating patients with speech and hearing difficulties. Her practice progressed to training actors for movie roles. One of her first clients included Dustin Hoffman whom she taught to sound like a woman for Tootsie. She taught deaf actress Marlee Matlin how to speak publicly when Matlin spoke at the 60th Annual Academy Awards and coached her with speaking roles in various films. Glass also worked with Sean Connery, Dolly Parton, Rob Pilatus and Fabrice Morvan of Milli Vanilli coaching them at a press conference when they returned their Grammy Award, Fran Dresher, Julio Iglesias, Andy García, Rob Lowe, Mickey Rourke and Dolph Lundgren. Caitlyn Jenner worked with Glass to learn how to feminize her voice and body language as she transitioned.

Glass has lectured on the topic of communication and body language throughout the world.

=== Media ===
Glass began her television career as a co-host on Alive and Well on USA Network and as a psychology reporter for KABC. She has since appeared as a commentator on a variety of news, reality and talk shows, including Good Morning America, Today, CNN, MSNBC, Inside Edition, 20/20, Dancing With the Stars (Season 8), Millionaire Matchmaker, Busted and Disgusted, and Dr. Phil. and appeared as herself on the reality show "I'm With Busey."

Glass has written a monthly body language column for Cosmopolitan. She publishes "Dr. Lillian Glass Body Language Blog" and also writes about celebrities and newsmakers in her column Reading People for Psychology Today. She has contributed to Women in Crime Ink.

=== Film director and producer ===
Glass appeared as herself, a body language expert, in the films Love Talk and Body Language Decoded.

Glass began a film career as a director and producer in 2017, focusing on human-interest subjects and social issues.

Her documentary Reinventing Rosalee (2018), about her mother, Holocaust survivor Rosalee Glass, has been reported to have won 57 awards worldwide.

She also directed Feisty Fighter: The Marnesba Tackett Story, which has been reported to have won 25 awards worldwide. The film was first screened at the Toronto Black Film Festival and won Best Documentary at the Hamilton Black Film Festival.

Her documentary Hey Beautiful received the “Best of the Best – Director: Human-Interest Short Documentary” award at the Jersey Shore Film Festival.

Glass also directed De-Escalation, which examines high-profile police encounters and communication strategies; the film was acquired for distribution by Gravitas Ventures.

=== Beauty pageants ===
At 18, Glass was awarded "Princess of the Americas" in a beauty pageant sponsored by the Inter-American Alliance, held in Miami Beach, Florida, at the Fountainbleau Hotel. In 1989, she served as a judge in the Miss USA Pageant for Miss Universe, held in Mobile, Alabama. She was awarded the title of "Senior Ms. Minnesota " in 2005 and participated in the Ms. Senior America Pageant, where she won the title of "Ms. Senior America- Community Service Winner" in Atlantic City, New Jersey. Glass was featured at th 8th annual Holiday Cabert in Palm Beach benefiting "A Safe Haven For Newborns" where she presented the charity with a donation on behalf of the Ms. Senior America Organization.

=== Noise pollution awareness advocacy ===
As a USC professor, Glass warned the public against the dangers of noise pollution.

=== "Toxic People" ===
The concept of "toxic people" as it's used in modern vernacular was popularized and coined by Glass in her 1995 book Toxic People - 10 Ways of Dealing with People Who Make Your Life Miserable. El País wrote of the term "Though it is difficult to say with any certainty when the phrase was first used, it's like[ly] that the "toxic" tag was coined by U.S. author Lillian Glass, who published her book Toxic People in 1995. Her work became a worldwide best-seller and the irresistibly evocative term began to spread.

=== Publications and books ===
Glass has published in various professional journals, including the New England Journal of Medicine.

Books by Glass covering human behavior, communication skills and body language, include:

- How to deprogram your valley girl. Workman Pub. 1982. ISBN 978-0894802393.
- Talk to win – Six steps to a successful vocal image. Perigee Trade. 1988. ISBN 978-0399513862.
- Confident conversation. PIATKUS BOOKS. 1991. ISBN 978-0749910853.
- He says, she says : closing the communication gap between the sexes. New York: Perigee Books. 1993. ISBN 978-0-399-51812-6.
- Attracting terrific people – how to find and keep the people who bring your life joy. St Martins Press. 1997. ISBN 978-0312150587.
- The complete idiot's guide to verbal self defense. Alpha. 1999. ISBN 978-0028627410.
- The complete idiot's guide to understanding men and women. Alpha. 2000. ISBN 978-0028624143.
- Toxic Men: 10 Ways to Identify, Deal with, and Heal from the Men Who Make Your Life Miserable. Adams Media. 2010. ISBN 978-1440500077.
- Toxic people – 10 ways of dealing with people who make your life miserable. Your Total Image Publishing. 2015. ISBN 978-1929873449.
- 50 ways my dog made me into a better person. Your Total Image Publishing. 2015. ISBN 978-1929873319.
- Bikram vocal yoga – Voice communication and body language skills to increase confidence and enrich your life
- I know what you're thinking – using the four codes of reading people to improve your life
- Guide to identifying terrorists through body language with former FBI Special Agent D. Vincent Sullivan
- The body language advantage: maximize your personal and professional relationships with this ultimate photo guide to deciphering what others are secretly saying in any situation
- The body language of liars – From little white lies to pathological deception – How to see through the fibs, frauds and falsehoods people tell you every day (2014), Career Press, Inc.
