= Ross Laidlaw (author) =

Scottish writer (1931–2025)

- Born: Ross Kinlay Laidlaw; 5 May 1931; Aberdeen, Scotland
- Died: 1 November 2025 (aged 94); Dunbar, Scotland
- Occupation: Writer
- Spouse: Margaret Corby (m. 1962)
- Children: 2
- Writing career
- Genres: historical fiction; thriller; spy fiction

Ross Kinlay Laidlaw (5 May 1931 – 1 November 2025) was a Scottish writer of historical, thriller and spy fiction.

== Life and career ==
Ross Kinlay Laidlaw was born in Aberdeen, Scotland, on 5 May 1931. He attended the University of Cambridge and gained his degree from the University of Edinburgh.

He met his wife Margaret (née Corby) while working at Dolphin School, near Newark in Nottinghamshire, where she was the matron and he was a master. They became engaged in Cambridge and were married on 7 September 1962 at the Corstorphine Old Parish Church in Edinburgh. The couple have a son and daughter.

Laidlaw spent time working and traveling in southern Africa.

In 1979, while working as a geography and history teacher at Belhaven Hill School near Dunbar, Laidlaw's first book was released, the political thriller novel The Lion Is Rampant, receiving significant praise. He later released five more books with the last being Justinian: The Sleepless One, which was released in 2010.

Laidlaw later lived in Dunbar, East Lothian. He died at a care home there on 1 November 2025, aged 94.

== Works by Ross Laidlaw ==
- The Lion Is Rampant (1979) (ISBN 978-0-904002-27-0) – originally published by Molendinar Press, it is a political thriller novel set in Scotland during the 1980s.
- The Linton Porcupine (1984) (ISBN 978-0-86241-063-6) – originally published by Littlehampton Book Services, the story is set in 16th-century Scotland and is written as the journal of Nicholas Wainwright who has been sent to find a weapon that is being created by the Scots.
- Aphra Behn: Dispatch'd from Athole (1992) (ISBN 978-1-872557-17-5) – originally published by Balnain Books, the story is set in 17th-century Britain and tells of Aphra Behn's journal which details her mission to Scotland as a spy.
- Attila: The Scourge of God (2004) (ISBN 978-1-904598-08-4) – originally published by Polygon Books, the story is set in 5th-century Europe and centers around Attila the Hun and Aetius who are in battle with each other for the fate of their empires.
- Theoderic (2008) (ISBN 978-1-84697-082-5) – originally published by Polygon Books, the story is set in 5th-century Europe during a time when the Western Roman Empire has been left in ruins, and centers around Theodoric the Goth who rises to a status equal of Roman Emperors.
- Justinian (2010) (ISBN 978-1-84697-158-7) – originally published by Polygon Books, the historical-fiction novel follows the life of Justinian I, an emperor of the Byzantine Empire.

== See also ==
- List of historical novelists
- List of people from Aberdeen
- List of Scottish novelists
- List of thriller writers
- List of University of Cambridge people
- List of University of Edinburgh people
