= Deborah Perry Piscione =

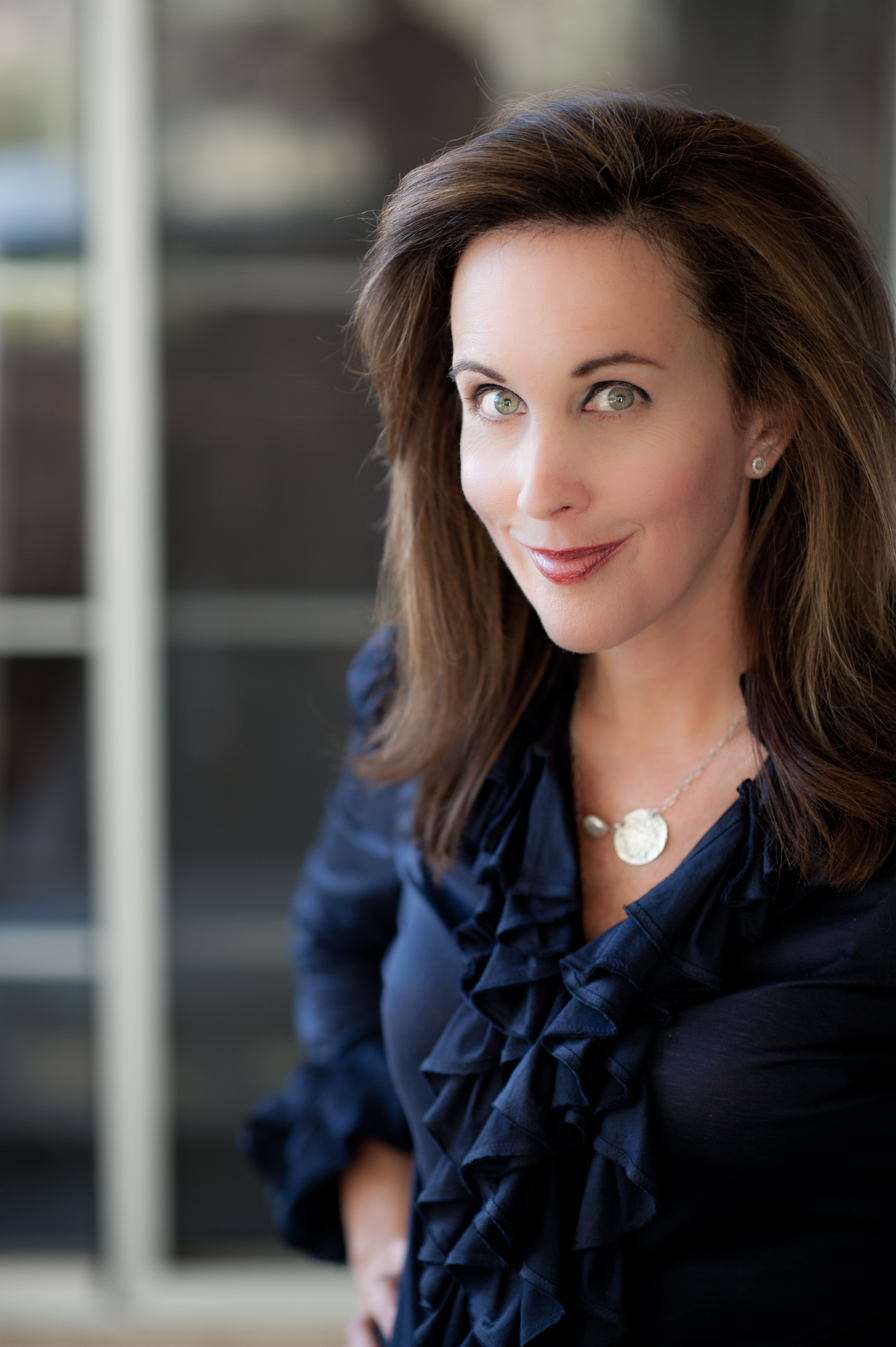
- Born: Miami, Florida
- Education: Georgetown University; Florida State University
- Occupations: Entrepreneur, author, public speaker, media commentator

Deborah Perry Piscione is an entrepreneur, author, media commentator and public speaker. She was a principal at Vorto Consulting. She is the co-founder and CEO of Desha Productions, Inc., a multimedia company that owns and operates Alley to the Valley and BettyConfidential, and co-founder of Chump Genius, an educational gaming company for kids.

== Career ==
Perry Piscione began her career on January 3, 1989, with the 101st United States Congress. During her time in Washington, D.C., she was a congressional staffer for U.S. Senator Connie Mack and U.S. Representative Ileana Ros-Lehtinen, and as a political appointee for President George H. W. Bush.

In 1998, Perry Piscione appeared on MSNBC, Fox News and CNN. She continued to work as a television and radio commentator for the remainder of her time in Washington, D.C.

In 2006, Perry Piscione moved to the Silicon Valley and built out three companies in six years. In 2007, she cofounded Desha Productions, Inc. with Shaun Marsh, a computer scientist, and launched BettyConfidential, an online magazine for women. In 2010, the site was named by ForbesWoman as one of the top 100 websites for Women, as one of AlwayOn's OnHollywood 100 Top Private Companies and as winner of Editorial Excellence at min's Best of the Web Awards.

In 2010, she created Alley to the Valley (initially with 85 Broads founder, Janet Hansen). Alley to the Valley is a networking and dealmaking event for women.

In 2012, she co-founded Chump Genius with 3D illustrators Mark and Lee Fullerton. Chump Genius is a gaming app series that combines entertainment fantasy adventures with science and math education for boys ages 8+.

== Published books ==
- The People Equation: Why Innovation Is People, Not Products (2017, with David Crawley)
- The Risk Factor: Why Every Organization Needs Big Bets, Bold Characters, and the Occasional Spectacular Failure (2014)
- Secrets of Silicon Valley: What Everyone Else Can Learn from the Innovation Capital of the World (2013)
- Unfinished Business: A Democrat and a Republican Take on the 10 Most Important Issues Women Face (2002, with Julianne Malveaux)
