= BettyConfidential =

Defunct American women's online magazine

- Editor-in-chief: April Daniels Hussar
- Former editors: Myrna Blyth
- Founder: Deborah Perry Piscione; Shaun Marsh
- Founded: March 2008
- Country: United States
- Website: Official website (2020 archive)

BettyConfidential.com was a United States women's online magazine. As of 2023, the website is now offline.

== History ==
Launched in March 2008, BettyConfidential.com was co–founded by author and television commentator Deborah Perry Piscione and Internet entrepreneur Shaun Marsh. After conducting studies of women on the internet, both Piscione and Marsh wanted to connect women who shared similar life stages, circumstance, goals, and interest in order for them to help and support other women.

The name Betty was chosen for the website to convey a trustworthy friend. Confidential was chosen to represent the hidden aspirations that exist in all women.

- March 5, 2008: NBC 11, the NBC affiliate for the San Francisco Bay Area, produced a full segment profiling BettyConfidential.com.
- March 9, 2008: msnbc and WCAU-TV of Philadelphia profiled BettyConfidential.com.
- March 11, 2008: BettyConfidential.com officially launches.
- March 11, 2008: The BettyConfidential.com launch was covered by several major outlets, including SmartMoney magazine.
- February 20, 2009: MSNBC reported on Betty's use of revolutionary technology to cover the Oscars.
- Deborah Perry Piscione is one of the recipients of the Women's Initiative "Women-Owned Business of the Year" award on November 10, 2009.
- September 16, 2010: BettyConfidential is recognized as a pioneering company in the digital entertainment age and is selected as one of the 2010 OnHollywood 100 Top Private Companies by AlwaysOn.

As of 2023 the BettyConfidential domain was for sale, with no activity on their social media pages since 2017.

== Contributors ==
The editorial department iwas headed up by editor-in-chief April Daniels Hussar. It was previously run by Myrna Blyth, author, TV commentator and editor-in-chief of Ladies' Home Journal, and founding editor-in-chief of More Magazine. The editorial staff was Sarah Polonsky, senior editor: Celebrities, Jane Farrell, senior editor: Mama Betty, Libby Keatinge, senior editor: Love+Sex, PJ Gach, senior editor: Style+Beauty, Faye Brennan, assistant editor, Kathryn H. Cusimano, assistant editor, Carolyn French, editorial assistant.

CNN's Soledad O'Brien served as chairman of the advisory board.
