= Whispers on Main Street =

Work of criminal fiction

- Author: Marie O'Connor
- Language: English
- Genre: Crime fiction
- Publisher: Poolberg
- Publication date: 1 February 2024
- Publication place: Ireland
- ISBN: 9781781996966
- Website: Books Ireland

Whispers on Main Street is Marie O’Connor’s debut crime fiction novel, published by Poolberg. O’Connor is working on the second book of what she plans as a trilogy.

== Plot ==
The book is set in 1961 in Ballantur (a fictional town), to which the character Caitlyn Kennedy – an early Ban Garda (policewoman) – has been posted. The character Nate oversees a mobile grocery service in the area and gossips with the people he visits. His wife's liaison with the local postman is revealed, leading Nate to attack him, only for the postman to then be found dead on the side of the road.

== Reception ==
The ’’Irish Independent’’ described ’’Whispers on Main Street’’ as ’pitch perfect’.

== Novelist ==
Marie O’Connor
- Born: 1974 (age 51–52); Castlebra, County Mayo, Ireland
- Occupations: Editor, secretary, window dresser
- Writing career
- Genre: Crime fiction

Marie O’Connor was born in a Castlebra in 1974.

Brought up on a farm near rural Turlough, County Mayo, O’Connor studied digital editing in Munster and then spent nine years (from its foundation in 1998) as an editor for TV3, working on news, breakfast and sport. After this she worked as a window dresser in Dublin and Galway. She retrained as a legal secretary after taking up residence in Galway. O’Connor wrote her first novel when she was nine. Marita Conlon-McKenna and Amanda-Jane Pearce are her favourite writers.

== See also ==
- List of crime writers
- Window dresser
