= Rosalee Glass =

Holocaust Survivor & Actress

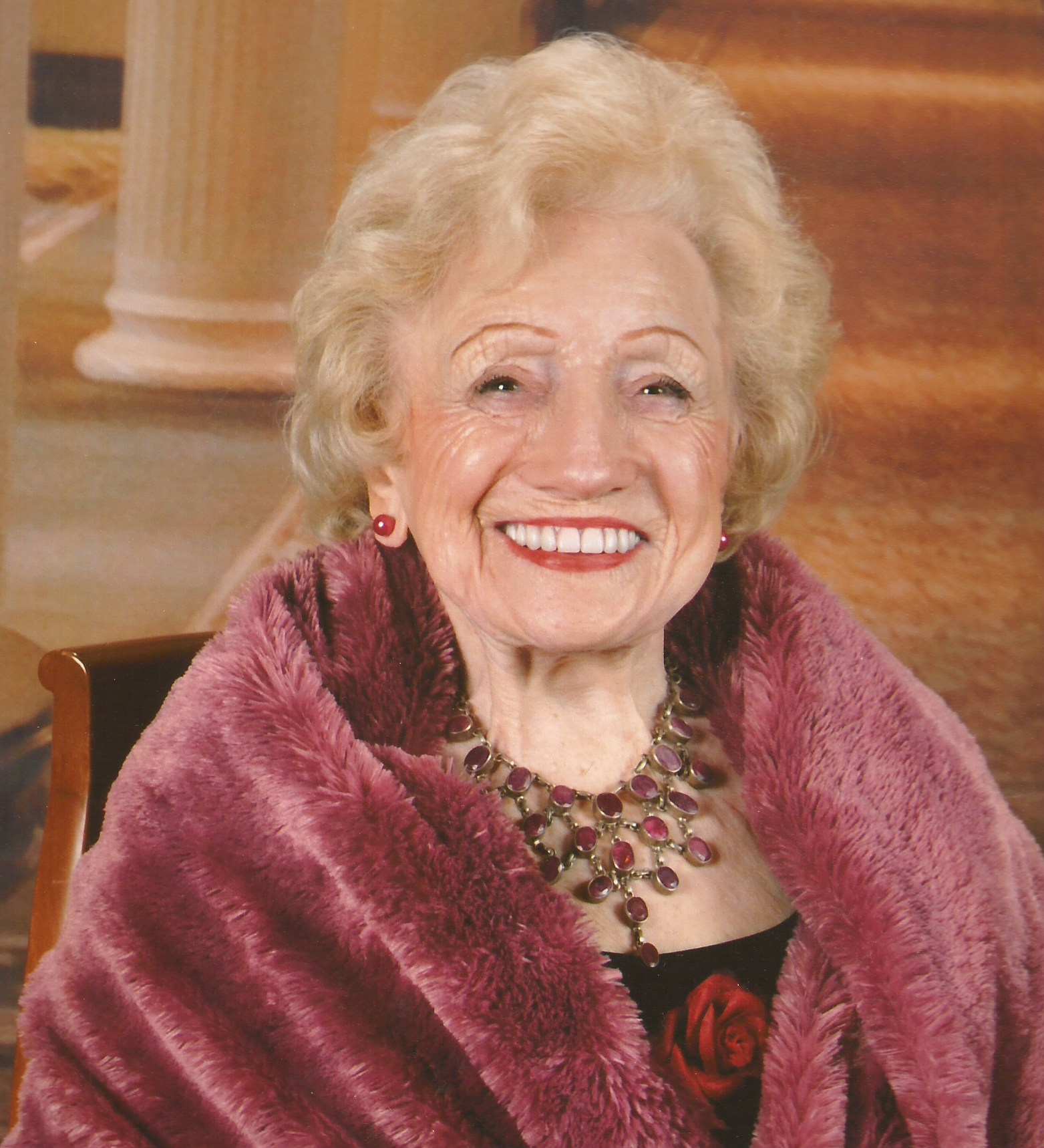
Rosalee Glass on her birthday in Los Angeles.

Rosalee Glass (née Raisla Talerman; January 28, 1917 – December 14, 2019) was a Polish-born American businesswoman and actress. She was the subject of the documentary Reinventing Rosalee and survived the Holocaust. Born in Warsaw, Poland, she survived the Holocaust.

== Early life ==
As a teenager she had a shirt making business where she made men's shirts for shops around Warsaw. She met and married violinist Abraham Glass. During World War II, Glass and her husband were deported to Siberia, where two of their children, Elias and Perla, died of starvation. Their third child, Manny, survived.

After the war, Rosalee, Abraham, and young Manny moved to the United States and settled in Miami, Florida where Rosalee set up a drapery manufacturing business. A year after arriving in Miami, Rosalee gave birth to daughter Lillian Glass.

Upon Rosalee's retirement from her drapery business, she and Abraham moved to California to be closer to their daughter. Following the death of her husband and the subsequent passing of her son, Glass moved to California to live with Lillian. Finally Glass had an epiphany: "believing that it's never too late to live your dream".

== Career ==
In later years, Glass traveled internationally, authored a book of personal maxims, and appeared in a Super Bowl commercial.

Her daughter Lillian Glass documented their adventures in Reinventing Rosalee. The film screened at 90 film festivals around the world and won 57 awards.

=== White House ===
In 2019, Glass was invited to the White House where she was honored as one of the oldest Holocaust survivors. While traveling to the event, Glass sustained injuries after she was accidentally dropped by airport personnel. She died from these injuries three weeks before her 103rd birthday..
