= Edward Attard =

Maltese writer

Edward (Eddie) Attard (b. 1947) is a Maltese writer. Born in Sliema, he received his education at the Lyceum. He joined the Malta Police Force in 1966 and between 1977 and 1986 he was in charge of the police publications. Attard published three books regarding the history of the Malta Police Force, two books about the Corradino Civil Prison. He is also the author of the best seller Delitti f'Malta (Homicides in Malta) a chronicle of all homicides cases in Malta from 1800 to April 2012. By 2009, he had published 11 mystery novels.

Attard is the author of other publications which includes 24 issues of Delitti u Misteri (Murders and mysteries).
