= Marian Lăzărescu =

Romanian luger (born 1984)

Marian Lăzărescu (born 17 July 1984) is a Romanian luger who has competed since 1999. He finished 15th in the men's doubles event at the 2006 Winter Olympics in Turin.

Lăzărescu's best finish at the FIL World Luge Championships was 18th in the men's doubles event at Park City, Utah in 2005.
