= Earle Basinsky =

American crime novelist (1921–1963)

- Born: Earle Morris Basinsky, Jr. December 26, 1921; Vicksburg, Mississippi
- Died: March 12, 1963 (aged 41); Vicksburg, Mississippi
- Occupation: Novelist
- Writing career
- Period: 1950s
- Genres: Hardboiled crime fiction, detective fiction

Earle Morris Basinsky Jr. (1921–1963) was an American crime novelist and protégé of Mickey Spillane. He wrote two novels, 1955's The Big Steal and 1956's Death is a Cold, Keen Edge, and five short stories.

== Biography ==
Basinky was born in 1921 in Vicksburg, Mississippi to Earle Basinsky Sr., and Aline Basinsky. He attended law school at the University of Mississippi in 1939 but left in 1942 to join the United States Army Air Forces, eventually earning the rank of captain. While stationed in Greenwood, Mississippi for pilot training, he met and befriended Mickey Spillane, who was then in Greenwood serving in the Army. He married Mary Johanna Poehlmann in 1945. After the war, he moved briefly to Brooklyn, New York, where he worked with Spillane. In 1946, apparently during his time with Spillane in New York, Basinsky published two short stories in comic books: "Killer's Choice" in Vic Verity, and "Knife Act" in Don Fortune Magazine. He returned to Vicksburg and worked at his father's printing shop, but was encouraged to return to writing when Spillane visited in 1953.

Like Charlie Wells and David A. Gerrity, Basinsky benefitted from Spillane's friendship and advice as a more seasoned author, as well as a connection to publishers. As he did with several other young writers, Spillane supported Basinsky's work with encouragement and cover blurbs praising Basinsky on his novels. Spillane also put in a good word to Basinsky's future publisher E.P. Dutton, writing that "This is my buddy 's book. He was there when I, the Jury was written."

Basinsky's first novel was 1955's The Big Steal, about a policeman who spirals down a dark path after being falsely accused of stealing ransom money. After losing both his job and his wife, he tracks down the real villain and gets violent revenge. A 1955 review of The Big Steal in Saturday Review called it an "incredible windup." The Big Steal was translated into French and published by the Serie Noire imprint as Le Magot. In 1956, his second novel, Death Is a Cold, Keen Edge, was released. It follows a psychopathic World War II veteran on a murder spree.

The original cover illustrations of Basinsky's novels, done by artist Robert Maguire, have been called some of "the most evocative and memorable of the period" by Lee Server, author of the Encyclopedia of Pulp Fiction Writers.

Critical appraisals of Basinsky's books ranged from positive to unenthusiastic. Critic Bill Pronzini, in 1001 Midnights: The Aficionado's Guide To Mystery and Detective Fiction, called Basinsky's novels "vivid (and) idiosyncratic." In Pronzini's later book Gun in Cheek: An Affectionate Guide to the "Worst" in Mystery Fiction, he said that Basinsky was better than his fellow Spillane protégés in that he shared his mentor's "knack for raw and stomach-churning violence," but that his writing was also cliche-ridden and narratively clumsy, with "a shameless desire to wax poetic every now and then." Anthony Boucher, writing in the June 26, 1955 New York Times Book Review, noted that The Big Steal's dedication read "For Mickey Spillane, who insisted, and for Nathan Jr., who suffered," and, instead of reviewing the book, simply stated that "personally, I'm on Nathan Jr.'s side."

Basinsky also published three short stories in crime-fiction pulp magazines in 1957 and 1958, titled, The Broken Window (February 1957), The Prison Break (October 1957), and Decision (March 1958). Critic Peter Enfantino, writing about them for Mystery File: The Crime Fiction Research Journal, said that they were "all short and unremarkable, flawed by outlandish premises and silly expositories."

Basinsky died on March 12, 1963, in Vicksburg.

== Writings ==
Novels

- The Big Steal (E.F. Dutton, 1955)
- Death Is a Cold, Keen Edge (Signet, 1956)

Short Stories

- "Killer's Choice" (in Vic Verity #4, May 1946)
- "Knife Act" (in Don Fortune Magazine #4, November 1946)
- "The Broken Window" (in Manhunt, February 1957)
- "The Prison Break" (in Mike Shayne, October 1957)
- "Decision" (in The Saint, March 1958)
