= Charlie Wells (writer) =

American crime novelist

- Born: Charles Harding Wells; August 2, 1923; Greenwood, Mississippi
- Died: October 10, 2004 (aged 81); Greenwood, Mississippi
- Occupation: Novelist
- Writing career
- Period: 1953–1955
- Genres: Hardboiled crime fiction, detective fiction

Charles Harding Wells (August 2, 1923 – October 10, 2004) was an American crime novelist and protégé of Mickey Spillane. He wrote two novels, 1953's Let the Night Cry and 1955's The Last Kill.

== Biography ==
Wells was born on August 2, 1923, in Greenwood, Mississippi, the son of Terrell Rush Wells and Emma Jones Harding Wells. He attended Georgia Institute of Technology, Mississippi State College, and Tulane University. Before beginning his writing career, he worked as a draftsman, drummer, and bank messenger, and was stationed in Europe during the Second World War, where he served in a field artillery unit and anti-aircraft battalion. He married Annie Lou Turner, a Greenwood librarian, in 1956. He lived in Greenwood until his death, on October 10, 2004, from heart failure.

== Writing career ==
Growing up in Greenwood, Wells was a childhood friend of Mary Ann Pearce, who would later marry Mickey Spillane. Wells, Spillane, and fellow Spillane protégé Earle Basinsky met while Spillane was stationed in Greenwood while serving in the Army. In the early 1950s, when Spillane himself had semi-retired from writing, Wells lived for a time in the Spillane household, where the elder writer took him under his wing. (Wells and fellow writer Joe Gill can be seen in a photograph in a 1952 Life magazine article on Spillane.) After working with Spillane for a year, Wells published his first novel, Let the Night Cry, at New American Library's Signet Books imprint, which also produced Spillane's Mike Hammer paperbacks.

As he did with several other young writers, Spillane supported Wells' work with advice, encouragement, and cover blurbs praising Wells on both of his novels. Wells himself freely acknowledged Spillane's influence, writing in The Last Kill that "it was Mickey himself who showed me how to pack guts, gore and hot, suspenseful action into a mystery yarn."

Let the Night Cry, published in 1953, is a crime thriller about an ex-convict set in New Orleans, which a New York Times reviewer said that Wells described as "a city seemingly consisting entirely of bars and night clubs." An Oakland Tribune reviewer described the book as "crime, love and dope in a chili-hot potpourri in New Orleans' picturesque and wicked Latin Quarter." The book sold more than 400,000 copies.

The Last Kill, published in 1955, is set in Memphis, Tennessee and follows a private eye who is trying to solve the murder of a friend who was involved in a million-dollar bank heist. August West, reviewing the novel on the blog Vintage Hardboiled Reads, noted that "what Wells did well is create a gloomy, drab, dark atmosphere for the novel. Very noir-ish. The whole story takes place in rainy, cold weather and mostly at night."

The original cover illustrations of Wells' novels, both done by artist Robert Maguire, have been called some of "the most evocative and memorable of the period" by Lee Server, author of the Encyclopedia of Pulp Fiction Writers.

Critical appraisals of Wells' books were positive but not enthusiastic. Bill Pronzini, in 1001 Midnights: The Aficionado's Guide To Mystery and Detective Fiction, called them "readable" but "Spillane-imitative." The New York Times Book Review called the hero of The Last Kill "the year's most incompetent private detective" but said the book would appeal to "addicts of Spillane." Even Wells' publisher had mixed feelings about his literary quality, if not his marketability: New American Library owner Victor Weybright overturned the original rejection of the novel, but in the same letter authorizing its publication, he called the book "God-awful trash, without Spillane's vibration and without plausible motivation, but abounding in retribution, lust, violence, booze, in the lower depths of New York and environs."

Wells did not publish again after The Last Kill. Server states that "apparently even Mickey lost track of him."
