= Pat Brown (criminal profiler) =

American criminal profiler

- Born: 1955 (age 70–71); New Jersey, United States
- Education: University of the State of New York (BA); Boston University (MA)
- Occupations: Criminal profiler, author, commentator
- Writing career
- Period: c. 2000–present
- Subjects: Crime, chiefly serial killing
- Notable works: The Profiler: My Life Hunting Serial Killers and Psychopaths
- Website: patbrownprofiling.blogspot.com

Pat Brown (born 1955) is an American writer, criminal profiler and commentator.

== Early life and education ==
Brown was born in New Jersey and moved with her family to Virginia at age nine. She has lived in Maryland since 1982.

In 1981, she graduated with a liberal arts degree from the University of the State of New York. She holds a Master of Arts degree in Criminal Justice from Boston University.

== Career ==
Brown wrote about her criminological approach in 2010 in The Profiler: My Life Hunting Serial Killers and Psychopaths with co-author Bob Andelman. In 2008 she wrote about the psychology of predators in Killing for Sport: Inside the Minds of Serial Killers. She is a co-founder of and a regular contributor to Women in Crime Ink, described by The Wall Street Journal as "a blog worth reading."

Brown has provided crime commentary, profiling, and forensic analysis on national and international TV and radio. She has appeared on CNN, MSNBC, FOX, NBC and CBS and has been a guest on "Today", "The Early Show", Nancy Grace, Jane Velez-Mitchell, HLN "Prime News", "America's Most Wanted", and "Coast to Coast AM". In October 2006, she appeared on The Montel Williams Show to discuss women who unknowingly date wanted criminals.

In three episodes, she profiled crimes on the weekly Court TV crime show I, Detective. She was the host of Discovery Channel's 2004 documentary The Mysterious Death of Cleopatra. She consulted and appeared as a profiler on Jack the Ripper (2010) for The Mystery Files.

Brown was a writer for The Crime Library, and a content contributor for the 2005 home DVD edition of Profiler: Season Two and the 2006 DVD release of Quentin Tarantino's crime classic Reservoir Dogs.

In May 2010, Ann Curry with NBC's Today Show interviewed Brown about her book, The Profiler.

Brown has been outspoken in her opinions about the 2007 disappearance of Madeleine McCann, a three-year-old British girl who was holidaying in Portugal with her parents. In a 2017 interview, Brown rejected the popular notion that McCann was abducted from the family's rented accommodation, arguing that she instead died within the apartment and the truth was "covered up". Brown said, "The evidence supports the theory of an accident occurring through neglect and possible medication. It's my belief the body was moved to a desolate location and will never be found... There are other children missing in the UK who aren't getting this attention that the [£11.1 million] should have been spent on."

== Bibliography ==
- Killing for Sport: Inside the Minds of Serial Killers (Beverly Hills, CA, New Millennium Press, 2003); (updated, Phoenix Books, 2008), ISBN 978-1597775755
- The Profiler: My Life Hunting Serial Killers and Psychopaths, Brown with Bob Andelman (Hyperion Books, 2010), ISBN 978-1401341268
- How to Save Your Daughter's Life: Straight Talk for Parents from America's Top Criminal Profiler (Deerfield Beach, FL: Health Communications, Inc [HCI], 2012), ISBN 978-0757316692
- The Murder of Cleopatra: History's Greatest Cold Case (Prometheus Books, 2013), ISBN 978-1616146504

Translations

- The Profiler has been translated and released in Korea as well as in Germany.

== YouTube channel ==
Beginning in 2021, Brown started an educational YouTube channel, ‘’Profiling with Pat Brown’’, in which she profiles cases in livestreamed videos.
