= Vanessa Leggett =

American freelance journalist and lecturer

- Born: Vanessa Levrier; May 18, 1968 (age 58); Houston, Texas, United States
- Education: Bachelor's degree Master's degree
- Alma mater: University of St. Thomas
- Occupations: author; journalist; lecturer; 1st Amendment advocate
- Spouse: Doak Leggett
- Writing career
- Language: English
- Genres: Narrative nonfiction True crime
- Notable awards: President's Award; Ancil Payne Award; PEN/Newman's Own; SPJ 1st Amendment; Zenger Award; Herb Block Freedom Award
- Movement: Jailed for not revealing sources

Vanessa Leggett (née Levrier; born May 18, 1968) is an American freelance journalist and lecturer who was jailed by the U.S. Justice Department for 168 days for protecting sources and research notes for an independent book about a federal murder-for-hire case. At the time, it was the longest contempt-of-court imprisonment of a journalist in United States history for protecting sources. Leggett holds the record for serving the most time for protecting source material and without providing that material to negotiate a release from prison.

== Early life and education ==
Leggett, the daughter of a Houston oil trader, earned her bachelor's degree in English and a master's degree in liberal arts from the University of St. Thomas (Texas).

== Case history ==
In April 1997, the body of Houston socialite Doris Angleton was discovered in her home. She died from 13 gunshot wounds to her face and chest. At the time of the death, her twin daughters and husband, Robert Angleton, a millionaire and former bookie, were at a softball game.

Leggett researched the case for five years. In 1998, during a series of jailhouse interviews of Roger Angleton, a suspect in a murder-for-hire plot and Robert's brother, Leggett compiled notes and hours of audio tape that reportedly detailed how Robert hired him to murder Doris. The interviews occurred just before Roger's suicide in his Harris County jail cell and before Robert's trial.

On 19 June 2001, U.S. District Judge Melinda Harmon ordered Leggett to appear in court the next day with her notes and tapes for a book she was writing about the murder. The order was in response to a grand jury that had convened to investigate the possibility of filing federal murder charges against the victim's husband, Robert Angleton. Leggett appeared in court on 20 June 2001 and refused to turn over her notes, citing reporter's privilege. Prosecutors argued she did not qualify as a journalist because she did not yet have a book contract. She was then held in civil contempt of court and jailed by the U.S. Justice Department for refusing to turn over her notes. Numerous news organizations and others championed Leggett's case, advocating that the public interest requires protecting journalists in Leggett's position. The New York Times called Leggett's incarceration "a brazen assault on 1st Amendment values and the public interest in a free press."

Leggett appealed her case to the United States Supreme Court in 2001. The Center for Individual Freedom filed an amicus brief in support of Leggett's petition asking the U.S. Supreme Court to hear her case. The center also contributed to her legal defense fund. In addition, the Society of Professional Journalists, through its legal defense fund, paid half of Leggett's legal expenses. The Supreme Court declined to hear the case.

Leggett gave a prison interview for the Fall 2001 issue of The News Media & The Law and told the magazine she did not know at that point how long she would remain incarcerated.

On 4 January 2002, she was released from the Houston Federal Detention Center after serving the maximum sentence of 168 days for the civil contempt charge when the federal grand jury completed its term. Leggett said to reporters as she walked out of jail, "This is not so much about me. It's about the public's right to a free and independent press."

After her release, Leggett appeared on the Charlie Rose show in April 2004 and said, "(My sources) had taken a chance by cooperating with me and giving me information and trusting me with that information. And I felt obligated to honor that. When I realized that underlying this was an assault on the 1st Amendment, it became something much larger than just my sources or just my book. It was about protecting the free flow of information to the public."

== Career ==
From 1995 to 2016 Leggett taught criminology, as well literature and writing courses, at the University of Houston-Downtown, as a faculty member for the Department of English as well as for the university's Criminal Justice Training Center, where she taught Texas police recruits and lectured veteran homicide investigators.

Leggett signed a book contract in 2002 with Crown Publishing, a division of Random House, about the Angleton murder for a reported $600,000 advance.

=== Criminal justice lecturer ===
In 2002, she headlined with journalist Bob Woodward at the 23rd Annual Washington Writers Conference held at the National Press Club. At the same event, Leggett was given the Washington Independent Writers' President's Award. In addition, the Washington Independent Writers' Legal and Educational Fund presented Leggett with a $1,000 check for her stand in support of the First Amendment.

She also lectured at the Royal Canadian Mounted Police; the Swedish National Board of Forensic Medicine; and the Netherlands Institute for the Study of Crime and Law Enforcement.

She gave the keynote address at the Institute for Ethics and Journalism's 2007 conference, which was sponsored by the Knight Foundation's Program in Journalism Ethics and Washington and Lee University's department of journalism and mass communications. In 2015, she sat on the First Amendment Advocacy panel at the National Press Club and discussed the need for stronger legal protections for journalists. And in 2016, she gave a presentation at the International Academy of Investigative Psychology's annual conference at John Jay College of Criminal Justice.

She has also given talks to the New York City Bar Association and the FBI Academy's Behavioral Science Unit.

=== Awards ===
- The University of Oregon in 2002 awarded Leggett the Ancil Payne Award.
- Washington Independent Writers gave her the President's Award in 2002.
- The PEN American Center awarded her the 2002 PEN/Newman's Own First Amendment Award, with one judge stating that her case was "especially inspiring" because she "fought her battle without the backing of a newspaper or media organization." Leggett, in her acceptance remarks, said, "Having been confined to a place where civil rights are contemptuously regarded as 'legal loopholes' or antiquated nuisances, I can't tell you how good it feels to be in the company of those who not only respect the First Amendment, but actively work to defend free expression and give it life in their art."
- The Society of Professional Journalists awarded Leggett its 2002 First Amendment Award for refusing to turn over her notes to authorities.
- Leggett received the Newspaper Guild's first Herblock Freedom Award in 2002.
- The University of Arizona School of Journalism gave her the 2003 John Peter and Anna Catherine Zenger Award for Press Freedom.
- The Freedom of Information Foundation of Texas presented Leggett with its 2002 James Madison Award.

=== Published works ===
==== Books ====
The FBI Academy, U.S. Department of Justice, released two books by Leggett, The Varieties of Homicide and its Research, published in 1999, and The Diversity of Homicide, co-authored by Leggett with Paul Blackman and John Jarvis, published in 2000.

==== Articles ====
While in custody, Leggett continued her career as a freelance writer with an article for Newsweek, headlined "My Principles Have Landed Me in Jail," which was published in the magazine's September 2001 edition.

She wrote a Texas Monthly article for its July 2002 issue titled "Doing Time" about her five-and-a-half months spent behind bars at the Federal Detention Center in Houston. The article appeared in Texas Monthly's crime issue, which received the 2003 general excellence award from National Magazine Awards.

She wrote two editorial pieces for the Houston Chronicle, titled "Down the Slippery Slope to Newspeak" published in 2004, and "Rosenthal Deserved Jail Time" published in 2008.

In 2015, Leggett had an exclusive interview with then-accused serial killer Robert Durst, after Durst contacted her via social media and invited her to lunch, which culminated in a feature story for Esquire magazine titled "My Lunch with Robert Durst."

In 2024, Leggett, in an opinion piece for the Austin American-Statesman, publicly supported the federal PRESS Act, which passed in the House but failed in the Senate, writing that "The PRESS Act protects journalists’ confidential relationships with sources, much like the law protects other relationships that depend on confidentiality, from attorneys and clients to priests and congregants. Protections are subject to common sense exceptions for terrorism and other exigencies." While the federal government still lacks a shield law, as the bill passed in the House but failed in the Senate and is now stalled, almost all states and D.C. provide legal protection for journalists’ sources through legislation or judicial precedent.

== Personal life ==
She is married to Doak Leggett.
