= Sexual abuse scandal in the Roman Catholic Diocese of Savannah =

The sexual abuse scandal in Savannah diocese is a significant episode in the series of Catholic sex abuse cases in the Roman Catholic Diocese of Savannah United States of America. In 2004 it was reported that the Diocese had secretly paid a total of $50,000 to 12 people who accused 7 priests who served in the Diocese of sexually abusing them. One accused clergyman, Wayland Brown, was convicted, and died in prison in 2019. Another accused clergy, Lorenzo Garcia, was defrocked in 2008 without facing any criminal punishment. Henry Groomer, another Catholic clergyman who was accused of sex abuse, committed suicide in 2017 after being served with a lawsuit.

== Wayland Brown case ==
In 2004, Wayland Brown was dismissed from priesthood and afterwards spent five years in prison for sex abuse in Maryland.

In October, 2009, the diocese of Savannah paid $4.24 million to settle a lawsuit which alleged that bishop Raymond W. Lessard allowed a priest named Wayland Brown to work in the diocese when Lessard knew that Brown was a serial child molester who posed a danger to children.

According to a Georgia sheriff's sergeant, Lessard refused to cooperate in a sex-abuse investigation of Brown in 1986. The sergeant said Brown could not be questioned because Lessard "sent him to an unknown location for an indefinite amount of time." At no time did Lessard provide police with any helpful information pertaining to Brown.

A second case involving Brown was settled for $4.5 million in 2016.

In 2018, Brown was convicted in South Carolina for his other two child rapes and received a sentence of 20 years in prison. Though he sexually abused children while serving in the Diocese of Savannah, Brown would often attempt to cover his tracks by transporting his victims out of the state of Georgia when he sexually abused them as well. On June 8, 2019, Brown died in a South Carolina prison.

Multiple lawsuits have also filed against the Diocese of Savannah alleging that the Diocese covered up sex abuse allegations against Brown.
