= Nancy Taylor Rosenberg =

American writer

Nancy Camille Taylor-Rosenberg (July 9, 1946 in Dallas, TX – October 3, 2017 in Las Vegas, NV) was an American writer. She attended school at Gulf Park and resided last in Las Vegas.

Her first novel, Mitigating Circumstances, was published in 1993, and the film rights were obtained by director Jonathan Demme. Rosenberg's novels have been translated into many languages. The majority of her novels have been New York Times bestsellers.

Rosenberg was known for her philanthropic efforts. She received national acclaim for her writing program for inner city youth called "Voice of Tomorrow". The Board of Supervisors of Orange County voted her "A Woman of Excellence, Learning for Life" in 1994. She was featured on Prime Time Live and in People magazine for her adoption of a child with a rare, terminal illness called methylmalonic acidemia (MMA).

== Bibliography ==
Probation Officer Carolyn Sullivan

- Sullivan's Law (Kensington Books 5/2004, ISBN 978-0-7582-0618-3)
- Sullivan's Justice (Kensington Books 5/2005, ISBN 978-0-7582-0619-0)
- Sullivan's Evidence (Kensington Books 5/2006, ISBN 978-0-7582-1302-0
- Revenge of Innocents (Kensington Books 5/2007)

Lily Forrester (ADA, later Judge)

- Mitigating Circumstances (Dutton Books 1/1993, ISBN 978-0-525-93587-2)
- Buried Evidence (Hyperion Books 9/2000, ISBN 978-0-7868-6619-9)
- The Cheater (Forge Books 6/2009, ISBN 978-0-7653-1902-9
- My Lost Daughter (Forge Books 9/2010, ISBN 978-0-7653-1903-6

Standalones

- Interest of Justice (1993)
- First Offense (1994)
- Trial by Fire (1995)
- California Angel (1995)
- Abuse of Power (1997)
- Conflict of Interest (2002)
