= P. J. Brooke =

Scottish author, living

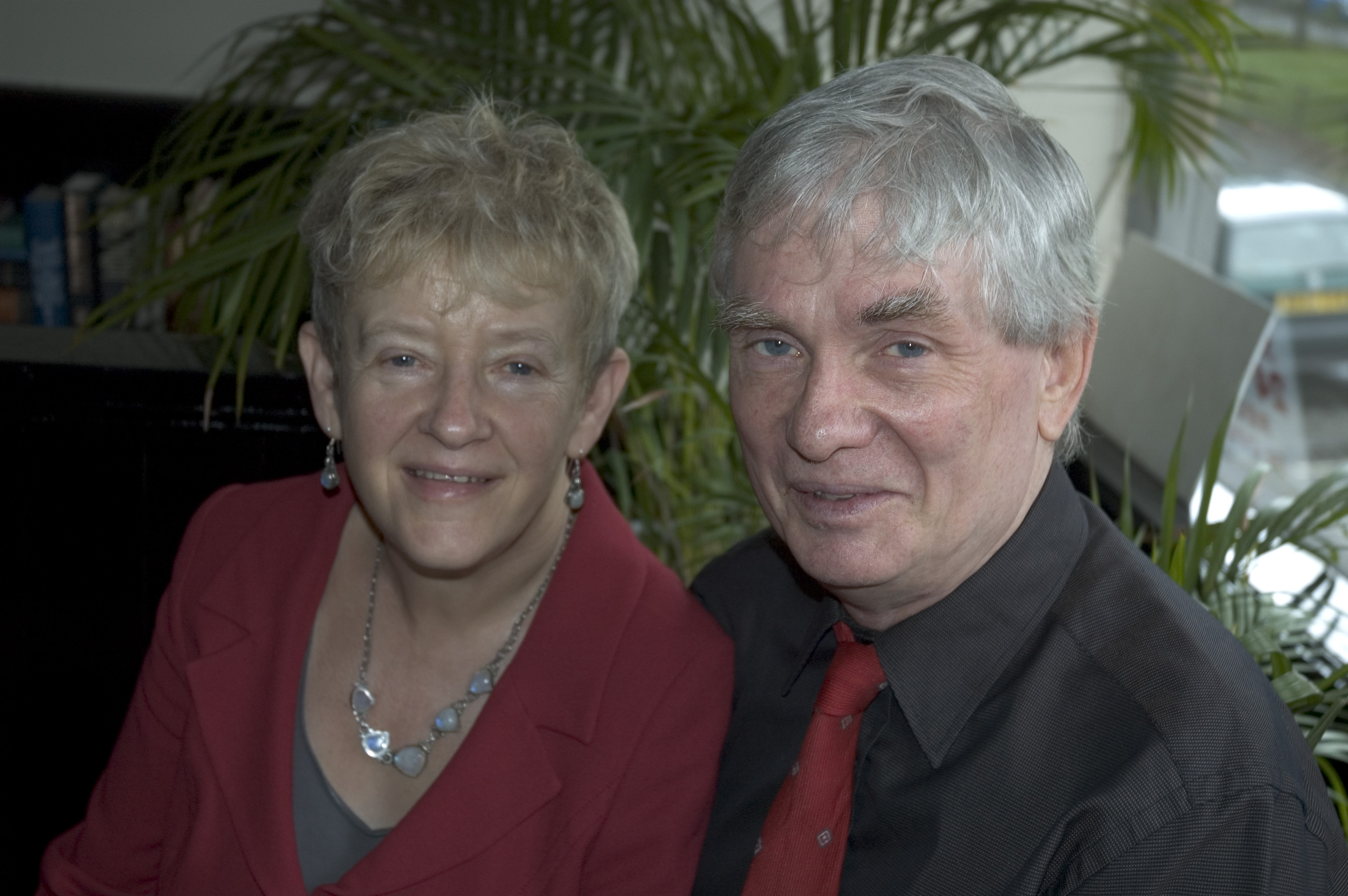
P. J. Brooke in Biblocafe, Glasgow.

P. J. Brooke is the pseudonym of a married couple, Philip James O'Brien and Jane Brooke, who have written three contemporary crime thrillers set in Granada, Spain, featuring sub-Inspector Max Romero. They have both written non-fiction under their own names.

== Writing fiction ==
Philip O'Brien started writing fiction after the death of his first wife. Jane Brooke got involved, commenting on exercises prepared for his creative writing class at Glasgow University, and then taking a more active role. Blood Wedding, their first novel, was published in 2008 by Constable & Robinson in UK and by Soho Press in the US, and a second novel, A Darker Night, ensued in 2010.

== Published works ==
=== Fiction (as P. J. Brooke) ===
- P. J. Brooke. Blood Wedding, London: Constable & Robinson; New York: Soho Constable, 2008. ISBN 9781569475294
- P. J. Brooke. A Darker Night, London: Constable & Robinson; New York: Soho Constable, 2010. ISBN 9781569476246
- P. J. Brooke. Death's Other Kingdom, New York: Little, Brown and Company, 2011. ISBN 9781849013888

=== Non-fiction by Philip O'Brien ===
- Philip O'Brien, ed. Allende's Chile, New York: Praeger Publishing, 1976. ISBN 0275557502.
- I. Roxborough, P. O'Brien and J. Roddick. Chile: State and Revolution, London: Macmillan Publishers, 1976: New York: Holmes and Meier, 1977
- P. O'Brien and J. Roddick. Chile: The Pinochet Decade: The Rise and Fall of the Chicago Boys, London: Latin American Bureau, 1983. ISBN 978-0906156186.
- Philip O'Brien and Paul Cammack, eds. Generals in Retreat: The Crisis of Military Rule in Latin America, Manchester: Manchester University Press, 1985

=== Non-fiction by Jane Brooke ===
- M. Bhatti, J. Brooke and M. Gibson, eds. Housing and the Environment: The New Agenda, Coventry: Chartered Institute of Housing, 1992

== Personal life ==
O'Brien and Brooke, who are married to each other, live in the Albaicín in Granada, Spain and also in Glasgow, Scotland. O'Brien is Scottish; Brooke was born in Leigh-on-Sea, Essex, England and was brought up in Yorkshire.
