= Michael Kenyon (British writer) =

British author

- Born: 26 June 1931; Huddersfield, England
- Died: 29 May 2005 (aged 73); Southampton, New York
- Education: Wadham College, Oxford
- Occupation: Author
- Writing career
- Notable work: May You Die in Ireland

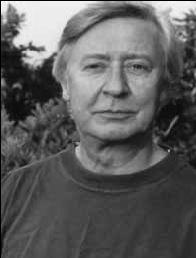
Michael Kenyon

Michael F. Kenyon (26 June 1931 – 29 May 2005) was a British author of crime novels. Author of more than twenty humorous mystery novels, he was one of the first in the field of spoof-espionage story telling, but was perhaps better known for the Superintendent O'Malley, and latterly Inspector Henry Peckover, series of books. Peckover was especially successful. A New York Times review said, "In Inspector Peckover Mr. Kenyon has created a very valuable addition to the classic British detective." Kenyon was also a regular contributor to Gourmet magazine, the Washington Post and the Los Angeles Times.

== Biography ==
Kenyon was born in Huddersfield, Yorkshire, in 1931. Educated at Leighton Park School before completing his National Service with the Royal Air Force he went on to read history at Wadham College, Oxford. He also spent a year at Duke University, North Carolina, on a Rotary Fellowship.

On his return to England, and after many unsuccessful applications to the BBC and up to thirty different newspapers, he finally secured a position as a reporter with the Bristol Evening Post, where he also contributed as Gloucestershire cricket correspondent. After three years and a brief stint with the News Chronicle, he joined the Manchester Guardian.

He married Catherine Bury, of Ireland, in 1961. They divorced in the 1990s, after some of events set out in his memoir of his family's time in Cahors, France, A French Affair: A British Family At Home In Southwestern France.

While holidaying at Whitegate, Cork Harbour in 1964 he began writing. His first novel, May You Die in Ireland, was an immediate success. Initially publishing all his crime novels through the Collins Crime Club, and later through Macmillan Publishers, he soon became an established and accomplished writer. The TLS said of his second novel, The Whole Hog, "Mr. Kenyon's first book, May You Die in Ireland, was good. The second is excellent."

After becoming a visiting lecturer to the University of Illinois, he returned to England briefly before moving to Southampton, New York where he taught in the English Department of Southampton College. He became a United States citizen in 1997.

Kenyon died in 2005 after suffering a heart attack at home in Southampton.

== Novels ==
- May You Die in Ireland (1965)
- The Whole Hog (1967)
- Out of Season (1968)
- Green Grass (1969)
- Mr. Big (1975)
- Brainbox and Bull (1976)
- The Rapist (1977)
- Deep Pocket (1978)
- The Molehill File (1978)

=== Superintendent O'Malley Series ===
- Hundred Thousand Welcomes (1970)
- Shooting of Dan McGrew (1972)
- A Sorry State (1974)

=== Inspector Peckover Series ===
- Zigzag (1980)
- The Man at the Wheel (1982)
- A Free-Range Wife (1983)
- A Healthy Way to Die (1986)
- Peckover Holds the Baby (1988)
- Kill the Butler! (1991)
- Peckover Joins the Choir (1992)
- Peckover and the Bog Man (1994)

=== Other ===
- A French Affair: A British Family at Home in Southwestern France (1992)

== Sources ==
- Wadham College, Oxford. College Alumni Gazette, January 2006 edition.
- The Whole Hog - pub. Collins Crime Club 1967 - Sleeve Notes
- Bibliography at http://www.fantasticfiction.co.uk/k/michael-kenyon/
