= American Independent Writers =

American trade organization

American Independent Writers (AIW) was an American trade organization for professional writers. It existed from 1975 until about 2011, when, due to dwindling membership and financial problems, it went out of business.

== History ==
It was formed as the Washington Independent Writers (WIW) in 1975 by a group of freelance writers in the Washington, D.C., area to address concerns over finding health insurance, job searching, and to provide social opportunities to help writers overcome isolation. Its first meetings were held in the National Press Club.

The first meeting, in April 1975, was attended by 200 people. By 1987, WIW was the largest regional writers' group in the country. In 2004, it had 1500 members.

== Services ==
Originally WIW provided services including "a monthly newsletter, Job Bank, social activities, directory of members, legal services program, health insurance access, grievance procedures, medical insurance, and a continuing round of workshops and seminars."

By the 1980s, these had expanded to include political activism, and legal support and fundraising, most famously for founding member Kitty Kelley from 1983 to 1984, when she was sued by Frank Sinatra in an attempt to stop her publication of his unauthorized biography, His Way.

The group changed its name to American Independent Writers on July 1, 2008, to open up more opportunities for grants and donations.
