= Display window =

Type of shop display

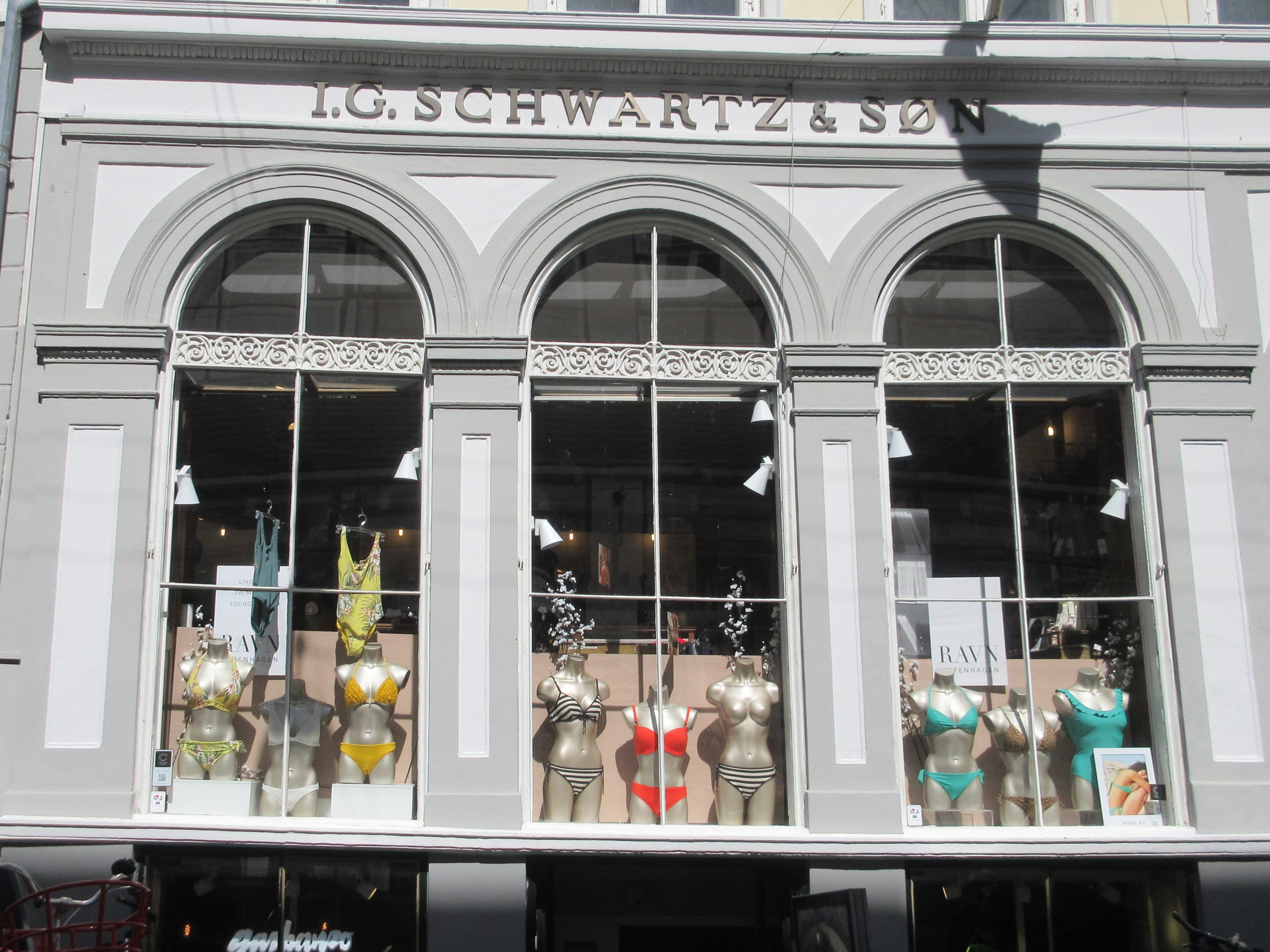
Arch-crowned display windows of a heritage listed shop front from 1847 at Sværtegade 3 in Copenhagen, Denmark. A lunette toplight surmounts each ornate transom.

A display window, also a shop window (British English) or store window (American English), is a window in a shop displaying items for sale or otherwise designed to attract customers to the store. Usually, the term refers to larger windows in the front façade of the shop.

== History ==
The first display windows in shops were installed in the late 18th century in London, where levels of conspicuous consumption were growing rapidly. Retailer Francis Place was one of the first to experiment with this new retailing method at his tailoring establishment in Charing Cross, where he fitted the shop-front with large plate glass windows. Although this was condemned by many, he defended his practice in his memoirs, claiming that he "sold from the window more goods...than paid journeymen's wages and the expenses of housekeeping. Display windows at boutiques usually have dressed-up mannequins in them.

== Window dressing ==
Displaying merchandise in a store window is known as window dressing, which is also used to describe the items displayed themselves. A retail worker that arranges displays of goods is known as a window dresser.

As a figure of speech, window dressing means something done to make a better impression, and sometimes implies something dishonest or deceptive.

== Window dressers ==
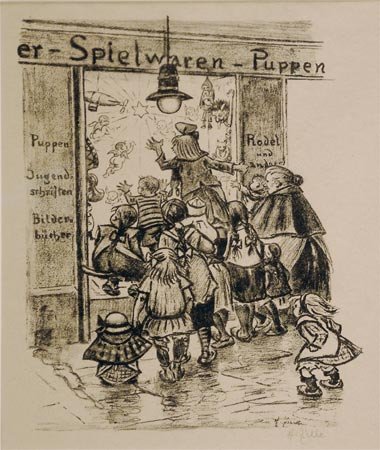
Window dresser

Window dressers are retail workers who arrange displays of goods in shop windows or within a shop itself. They may work for design companies contracted to work for clients or for department stores, independent retailers, airport or hotel shops.

Alone or in consultation with product manufacturers or shop managers they artistically design and arrange the displays and may put clothes on mannequins—or use the services of a mannequin dresser—and display the prices on the products.

They may hire joiners and lighting engineers to augment their displays. When new displays are required they have to dismantle the existing ones, and they may have to maintain displays during their lifetimes. Some window dressers hold formal display design qualifications.

=== Notable window dressers ===
- Giorgio Armani, the fashion designer, once worked as a window dresser.
- L. Frank Baum, better known for his novel The Wonderful Wizard of Oz, published a treatise on the art of window dressing.
- Karl Bissinger, American mid-century photographer of notable artists, was a window-dresser at Lord & Taylor earlier in his career.
- Henry Clarke, a Vogue photographer, first worked in the 1940s as a window dresser for I. Magnin, luxury department store in San Francisco before becoming a background and accessorising assistant at the Vogue New York studio, where he learned to photograph by observing the different styles of Cecil Beaton, Irving Penn and Horst P. Horst.
- Salvador Dalí, the surrealist artist, was commissioned by Bonwit Teller in 1939 to do a store window installation, which made headlines.
- George Dureau, an American photographer and artist who inspired Robert Mapplethorpe, began his career at D. H. Holmes department store
- Simon Doonan, columnist for Slate, dressed windows for Barneys department store.
- Lieutenant Hubert Gruber, a character from the sitcom 'Allo 'Allo!, was a window dresser before his spell in the army. This is frequently alluded to, mainly for comedic effect.
- Roy Halston Frowick, known simply as Halston, a 1970s American fashion designer, worked as a window dresser while taking a night course at the School of the Art Institute of Chicago.
- David Hoey is famed for his work at Bergdorf Goodman, most notably on their Christmas season spectaculars.
- Victor Hugo, a Venezuelan born artist, and one-time assistant to Andy Warhol, produced window dressings for Halston in the 1970s, becoming the first to transform windows and mannequins into Pop Art.
- Don Imus, American radio personality once worked as a department store window dresser.
- Ellen Jose, an Australian indigenous artist and photographer.
- Alice Lex-Nerlinger, after graduation from art school, worked as a shop window decorator in the department store Tempelhof from 1916 to 1918, an experience which brought her closer to sisters in the labour movement, the subjects of her early photography and montage.
- Peter Lindbergh, German fashion photographer and film director, worked as a window dresser for the Karstadt and Horten department stores in Duisburg.
- Raymond Loewy, early in his career, dressed windows for Macy's in New York.
- Christine McVie worked as a window dresser in London in the 1960s.
- American stage director and film director Vincente Minnelli's first job was at Marshall Field's department store in Chicago as a window dresser
- Gene Moore was a leading 20th century window dresser.
- Molina, a fictional character, one of the principals of Manuel Puig's novel Kiss of the Spider Woman, was a window dresser prior to his incarceration.
- Rhoda Morgenstern, a fictional character from The Mary Tyler Moore Show and its spinoff Rhoda, makes her living as a window dresser in Minneapolis and New York City.
- Marie O'Connor worked as a window dresser in two different cities before writing Whispers on Main Street.
- Walter Pfeiffer, Swiss photographer.
- Terry Richardson, American fashion and portrait photographer, was a Bloomingdale's window dresser in the 1950s.
- Henk Schiffmacher, Dutch tattoo artist, was a window dresser at the De Bijenkorf
- Joel Schumacher, the film director, was once a window dresser employed by the store Henri Bendel.
- E. C. Segar left his job as a projectionist and worked at decorating jobs including paper hanging, painting and window dressing, before deciding on a career as a cartoonist.
- Henry Talbot worked as a department store window-dresser in London in the 1930s before being shipped to Australia on the Dunera, where he became a fashion photographer and partner in business of Helmut Newton
- Hans Hermann Weyer, a German seller of fraudulent nobility and academics titles and flamboyant member of the international jet set who became an honorary consul of Bolivia in Luxembourg, was in youth an apprentice window dresser.

== See also ==
- Christmas window
- Storefront
- Window shopping
