= Myrna Blyth =

American editor and writer

Myrna Blyth (born 1939) is an American editor and writer. She previously worked at AARP Media and has authored four books, including the nonfiction book Spin Sisters.

== Biography ==
She was born in New York and graduated from Bennington College. She received a Master of Liberal Arts degree from Johns Hopkins in 2024.

Blyth is the former Senior Vice President and Editorial Director of AARP Media. She is the former editor-in-chief and publishing director of Ladies' Home Journal. She was the founding editor and publishing director of More magazine. She was also Director of Magazine Development for the Meredith Corporation. Earlier in her career Blyth was the Executive Editor of Family Circle and Senior Editor of Family Health Magazine.

She is also the author of two novels, Cousin Suzanne and For Better and For Worse, both Literary Guild selections, and two non-fiction books, Spin Sisters, which was a New York Times bestseller and How To Raise An American.

Blyth was the Chairman of the President’s Commission on White House Fellowships. She has written articles and short stories for many publications including The New Yorker, New York, Redbook, Cosmopolitan and Reader's Digest. She has written for National Review Online, National Review and other websites, and has been an editorial consultant for a number of magazine and internet projects. She was Editor-in-Chief of ThirdAge.com, the longest established website for boomer women.

=== Personal life ===
She was married to the British journalist Jeffrey Blyth, who died in 2013. She has two sons, a granddaughter, and a grandson.

== Published works ==
- Cousin Suzanne (Mason/Charter, 1975)
- For Better and For Worse (Putnam, 1979)
- Spin Sisters: How the Women of Media Sell Unhappiness and Liberalism to the Women of America (St. Martin's Press, 2004)
- How to Raise an American (Crown Forum, 2007)

== Awards ==
The awards received by Blyth include the Matrix Award from New York Women In Communications, Inc.; the Henry Johnson Fisher Award from the Magazine Publishers Association; the Woman of Achievement Award from the New York City Commission on the Status of Women; and the Headliner Award from the Association for Women in Communications, Inc. She was named “Publishing Executive of the Year” by Advertising Age.
