= Robert Maguire (illustrator) =

American illustrator (1921–2005)

Robert A. Maguire (August 3, 1921 – February 26, 2005), or R. A. Maguire, was a twentieth-century American illustrator and fine artist. Known primarily for his crime noir paperback cover art, he produced artwork for over 1,200 covers from 1950 until his death. Maguire is a Member Emeritus of The Society of Illustrators.

== Life ==
Son of a draftsman architect, Robert Maguire began his education at Duke University, but like so many others of his generation, left for service in World War II, fighting with the 88th infantry in Italy. Upon his return, his interest in art led him to the Art Students League in New York, where his instructor was the famed Frank Reilly. Two of Maguire's more noteworthy fellows were Clark Hulings and James Bama, graduates all of the class of '49.

Maguire's career took off immediately with his first work for Trojan Publications: cover art for their line of small pocket pulps, with titles like Hollywood Detective Magazine (Oct. 1950). Maguire did three of the eight covers for this pocket pulp series. From then on, his career blossomed.

Maguire's classic period of the 50s and 60s grew out of his skilled images of female subjects, wherein his mastery of the "femme fatale" made the figure a vintage paperback icon.

Robert Maguire continued evolving and producing fine art as well as many memorable illustrations.

== Artwork ==
Maguire's over 1,200 covers for such publishers as Pocket, Dell, Ace, Harper, Avon, Silhouette, Ballantine, Pyramid, Bantam, Lion, Berkley, Beacon, Monarch and Signet - virtually every mainstream publishing house in New York - makes his original cover art a tour de force in the last half of the twentieth century. Maguire's "Wild to Possess" was used on the cover of Big Rude Jake's 2012 album, "Live and Out Loud".

One of his most famous book covers is Black Opium, which is considered by many crime noir paperback collectors to be the definitive crime noir paperback cover of the genre. He also designed art covers for video games and for music CDs.

== See also ==
- Illustration
- List of illustrators
