= Robin Sax =

American lawyer

- Born: Robin Ann Sax; January 1, 1972 (age 54); Los Angeles, California, U.S.
- Education: University of California, Santa Barbara (BA); Pepperdine University School of Law (JD); University of Southern California (MSW)
- Occupations: Lawyer, Legal Analyst, Writer, former prosecutor
- Children: 1 daughter
- Writing career
- Genre: True crime
- Subject: Crime
- Notable work: It Happens Everyday: Inside the Life of a Sex Crimes DA
- Website: www.robinsax.com

Robin Ann Sax (born January 1, 1972) is an author, lawyer, clinical therapist, legal analyst, radio host, an HLN contributor, and a former prosecutor for the State of California, County of Los Angeles and Riverside County District Attorney's Office.

== Early life and education ==
Sax grew up in Los Angeles and graduated in 1984 from the Los Angeles Center for Enriched Studies. In 1993, Sax received her undergraduate degree from the University of California, Santa Barbara, and her juris doctor in 1997 from Pepperdine University School of Law. She also has a certificate of Alternative Dispute Resolution from Pepperdine. In 2018, Sax received a master's degree in Social Work (MSW) from University of Southern California.

== Career ==
=== Legal practice ===
She was admitted to the State Bar of California on November 24, 1997. The same year, she joined the Riverside County District Attorney's Office. In 1999, she joined the Los Angeles District Attorney's Office, where, for more than 10 years, she prosecuted sexual offenders. She left the district attorney's office in 2009.

She has served as an instructor for the Los Angeles Police Department, Los Angeles County Sheriff's Department, and the California District Attorneys Association. She has also been a lecturer at the University of California, Los Angeles’ paralegal program and an adjunct professor of criminal justice at California State University, Los Angeles.

She sat on a multi-disciplinary team at UCLA's Rape Treatment with the Department of Children and Family Services, law enforcement, victim advocates, and social workers. In March 2010, she was a speaker at the Conference on Crimes Against Women in Dallas, Texas. She was a trainer at the California Sexual Assault Investigators Association 2010 Spring Conference.

=== TV and radio appearances ===
Since 2009 she has appeared on NBC's Today Show, Good Morning America and ABC News., ET, The Insider, CNN, Dr. Phil Show, Al Jazeera America, Fox News Channel and HLN.

In 2008, Sax was featured on the nationally syndicated radio program "The Law Business Insider," hosted by Steve Murphy to discuss the Caylee Anthony case. She also appeared on the "Nancy Grace Show" in January 2009 to discuss the Anthony case.

In 2011 Sax joined Fox 11 News as a legal analyst for the Dr. Conrad Murray trial. She later became a regular legal contributor on Good Day LA and Studio 11 LA. She hosted the online show "Pick A Lane," where she discussed ongoing trials and legal matters with another co-host (regular hosts include Larry Elder and Darren Kavinoky), and they encourage viewers to contribute to the discussion through social media.

In 2012 Sax joined Current TV as a Producer and Legal Correspondent for The Young Turks. When Al Jazeera America purchased Current TV in 2013 Sax took on the role of Manager Show Operations for TechKnow.

In January 2013, she appeared on the Dr. Phil Show to discuss the Steubenville High School rape case, at the time an alleged rape of an underage teenage girl by high school football team members in Steubenville, Ohio.

=== Return to law practice ===
In 2015, Sax returned full-time to the practice of law. Her offices are located in Century City and her legal practice includes family law, dependency (juvenile) cases, victim advocacy, criminal defense, and entertainment and media. Robin regularly shares her legal expertise as a fill-in host on KABC Radio 790 in Los Angeles.

Previously she's represented the parents of teenager Amber Dubois, who was murdered in San Diego County in 2009 by convicted killer John Albert Gardner, and appeared on Larry King Live with Dubois' mother, Carrie McGonigle. She also represented Samantha Spiegel in an alleged stalking case against John Mark Karr, who falsely confessed to killing Jon Benet Ramsey.

Sax was also hired by author Sara Gruen in 2016 in order to help free Charles Murdoch, who was sentenced to life without parole after being convicted of first-degree murder in 1994.

=== Clinical therapist ===
In 2016, Robin began doing her hours as a clinical therapist in order to receive her Master of Social Work degree. She worked as a clinical therapist at Ánimo Inglewood Charter High School (a Green Dot Charter school) as well as at Harbor–UCLA Medical Center in the Adult Outpatient Psychiatric Unit.

In 2018, Robin joined the staff of the Violence Intervention Program where she is currently a program manager and clinical therapist for the Alexis Project at LAC+USC Medical Center. The Alexis Project is a partnership between The Alexis Arquette Family Foundation and the Violence Intervention Program (VIP) at the LAC+USC Medical Center. The Alexis Project is an extension of VIP's hallmark medical, mental health and support programs targeted at the LGBTQ+ population. Robin frequently trains clinicians, the community, educators, and medical staff on LGBTQ+ affirming care, treatment, and rights.

In 2020, Robin founded Dear Co-Parent. Dear Co-Parent draws on Robin's skills as a lawyer and a therapist and assists individuals involved in custody and family law issues or cases. She uses her joint degrees and training in order to assist couples deal with separation, parenting planning, and custody plans. Dear Co-Parent helps resolve disputes with a therapeutic sensitive approach combined with knowledge of the law using mediation, collaboration, and consensual dispute resolution.

Robin has appeared in court as an expert witness in criminal law and family law matters relating to child abuse, sexual assault, criminal prosecution, and child custody.

== Writing ==
Sax has authored six books, including It Happens Every Day: Inside the World of a Sex Crimes DA and The Complete Idiot's Guide to the Criminal Justice System.

She is a contributor to the Huffington Post. She has also contributed legal commentary on CBS News' Crimesider. She is a regular contributor to Women in Crime Ink, which the Wall Street Journal called "a blog worth reading."

== Personal life ==
She lives with her daughter in Los Angeles.

== Bibliography ==
- Predators and Child Molesters: What Every Parent Needs to Know to Keep Kids Safe, Prometheus Books, April 2009
- The Complete Idiot's Guide to the Criminal Justice System, Alpha, October 2009
- It Happens Every Day: Inside the World of a Sex Crimes D.A. Prometheus Books, October 2009
