= J. M. Hayes =

American author of mystery novels

J.M. (Mike) Hayes is an American author of mystery novels.

Hayes was born and raised in central Kansas, graduated from Wichita State University and did post graduate work at the University of Arizona.

Hayes lives in Tucson, Arizona with his wife, Barbara.

== Works ==
His first novel, The Grey Pilgrim follows fictional characters through a what-if version of 1940s Arizona history. Originally published by Walker and Company in 1990, it was re-issued by Poisoned Pen Press in Trade Paperback in 2000.

- The Grey Pilgrim (1990), ISBN 1-890208-50-7
- Mad Dog & Englishman (2000)
- Prairie Gothic (2003) The Best Novels You've Never Read, New York Magazine, 2007
- Plains Crazy (2004) Starred review, Booklist
- Broken Heartland (2007)
- Server Down (2009) Starred review, and one of five best mysteries of 2009, Library Journal
- English Lessons (2011)
- "The Spirit and the Skull" (2014) (historical mystery set in Prehistoric Alaska) Starred review, Booklist
