= The Three Godfathers =

The Three Godfathers may refer to:

- The Three Godfathers (short story), a 1913 short story by Peter B. Kyne, and its film adaptations:
  - The Three Godfathers (1916 film), starring Harry Carey
  - Three Godfathers (1936 film), featuring Chester Morris
  - 3 Godfathers, a 1948 film starring John Wayne

== See also ==
- Marked Men (1919 film), a remake of the 1916 film, also starring Harry Carey, considered a lost film
- Action (1921 film), an adaptation, regarded as lost
- Hell's Heroes (film) (1930), another adaptation, starring Charles Bickford
- Tokyo Godfathers (2003), an anime film by Satoshi Kon about three homeless people who find an abandoned newborn
