= Perminder Mann =

British book publisher

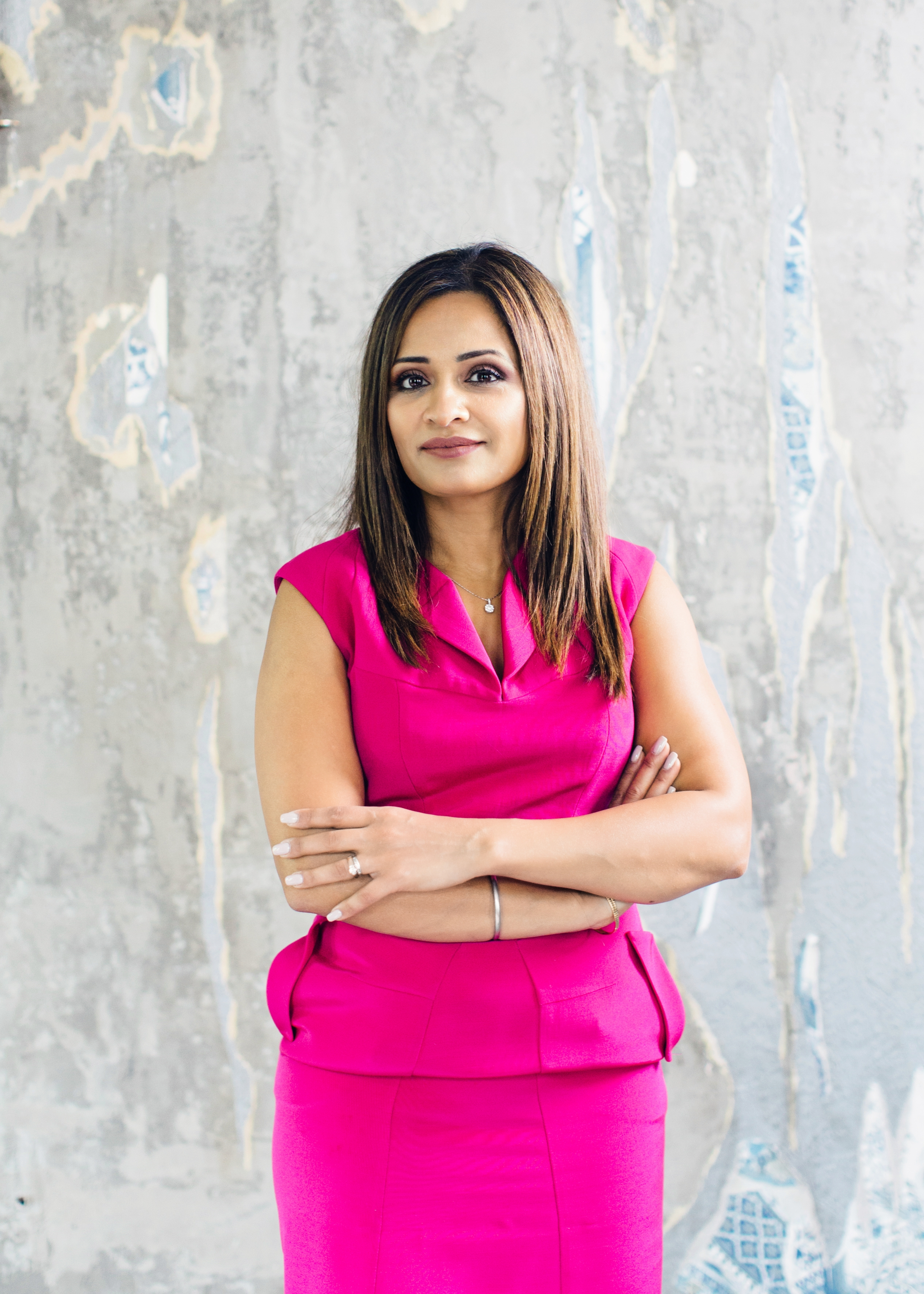
Perminder Mann in 2019

Perminder Mann is a British publishing executive and businesswoman, who since 2017 has been CEO of Bonnier Books UK, the seventh largest publisher in the UK with sales of more than £80m. She is recognised as one of the UK's most powerful leaders and as a publishing innovator – one of the first to publish a social media influencer and for her work introducing inclusive workplace policy.

Mann is President of the Publishers Association, Chair of the board of trustees of award-winning mentoring charity and support network, Arts Emergency, a fellow of the Royal Society of Arts, Honorary Visiting Professor at City University, and a member of the advisory board for Kingston University's publishing programme. She also appears annually in the UK's top 150 most influential people in book publishing, a list compiled by the industry's trade magazine, The Bookseller.

Mann was the first CEO of a major publisher to announce the move to a full flexible working policy in 2020. She is an advocate for inclusivity and collaboration in the workplace.

== Early life ==
Perminder Mann was born to immigrant parents and grew up in the West London Indian community. At the age of 13, she appeared in the BBC documentary Life of an Asian Girl.

== Career ==
After studying at De Montfort University, Mann began her career in publishing working for trade publishers Macmillan and Transworld, before moving on to work with two international independent publishers, Hinkler and Phidal Publishing. She then spent time in the toy industry, before returning to publishing to work for Bonnier Publishing, which rebranded as Bonnier Books UK in 2018.

During her time at Bonnier Books UK, she co-founded adult non-fiction imprint Blink Publishing. In 2014, the imprint became the first UK publisher to collaborate with a vlogger when it signed Alfie Deyes. Under Mann, Blink published The Pointless Book, which was a 2014 bestseller.

In 2017, Mann was promoted to CEO of Bonnier Books UK, heading the UK group. In the same year, she secured the deal for Bonnier Books UK to partner with Disney on a range of titles. She was subsequently recognised as one of the most powerful BAME leaders in the UK She was the only person from the book publishing industry to appear on the list.

In 2020, Bonnier Books UK was awarded the London Book Fair International Excellence Award for Inclusivity in Publishing. Mann was the first CEO of a major UK publisher to announce the move to a full flexible working policy for all office staff.

In February 2025, it was announced that Mann would be taking on a new role as CEO of Simon & Schuster International, effective from 1 May 2025.
