= Three Godfathers (1936 film) =

1936 film

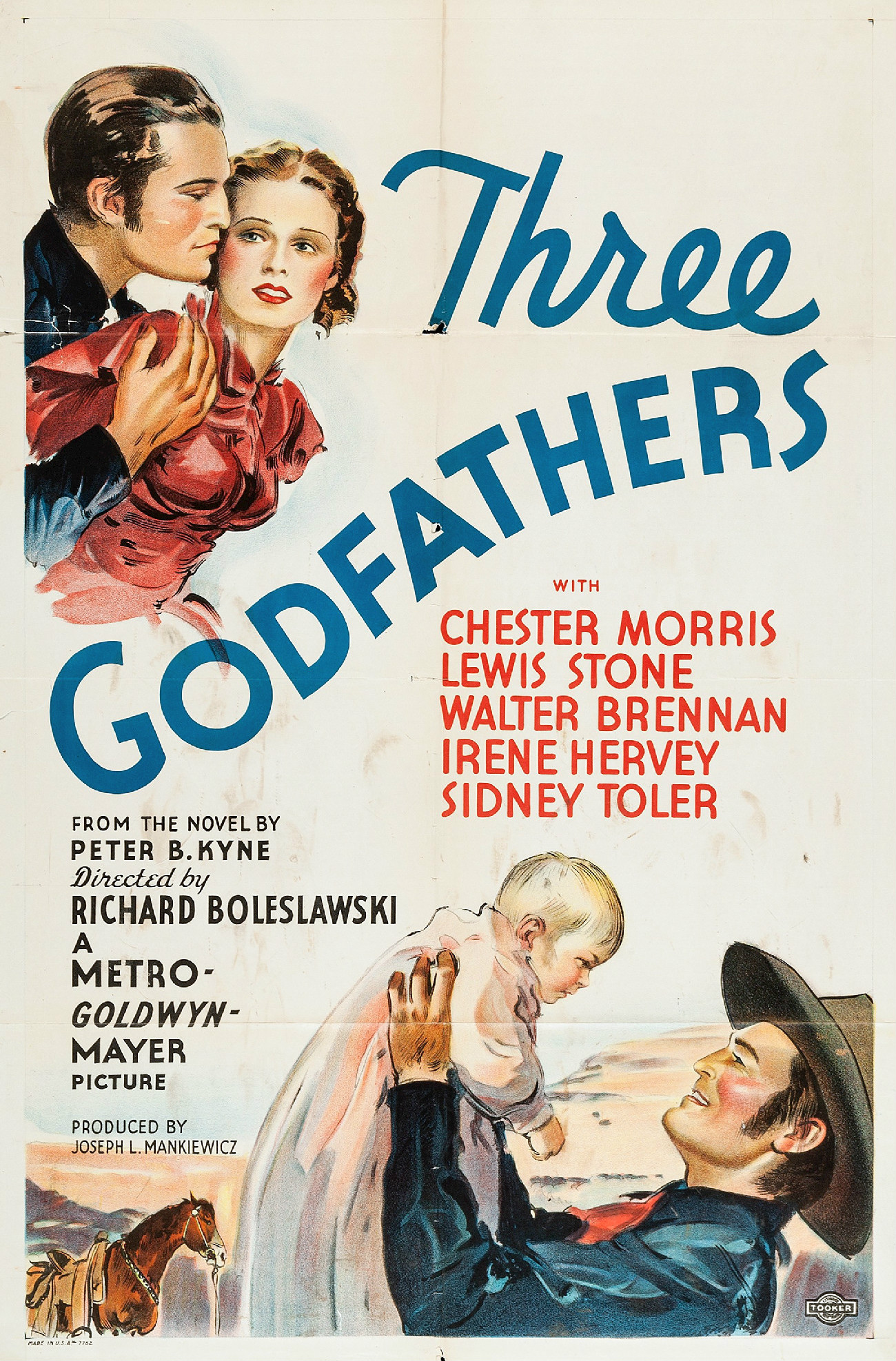
- Theatrical release poster
- Directed by: Richard Boleslawski
- Screenplay by: Edward E. Paramore, Jr. Manuel Seff
- Based on: The Three Godfathers; 1913 short story by Peter B. Kyne
- Produced by: Joseph L. Mankiewicz
- Starring: Chester Morris; Lewis Stone; Walter Brennan; Irene Hervey
- Cinematography: Joseph Ruttenberg
- Edited by: Frank Sullivan
- Music by: William Axt
- Production company: Metro-Goldwyn-Mayer
- Distributed by: Loew's Inc.
- Release date: March 6, 1936
- Running time: 81 minutes
- Country: United States
- Language: English

Three Godfathers is a 1936 American Western film directed by Richard Boleslawski and released by Metro-Goldwyn-Mayer starring: Chester Morris, Lewis Stone, Walter Brennan and Irene Hervey. It was adapted from the short story of the same name by Peter B. Kyne. Three bank robbers find a newborn baby and his dying mother in the desert.

Directors Edward LeSaint and John Ford had previously filmed silent versions of the film titled The Three Godfathers (LeSaint in 1916) and Marked Men (Ford in 1919), both of which starred actor Harry Carey. The first sound version was Hell's Heroes, which was also William Wyler's first all-talking film; it starred Charles Bickford, Raymond Hatton, and Fred Kohler. John Ford would later film yet another version of the film as 3 Godfathers (1948) dedicated to Carey, and starring John Wayne, Pedro Armendáriz, and Carey's son, Harry Carey Jr.

== Plot ==
A week before Christmas, four bandits ride through the desert and pause on a rise over the town of New Jerusalem: Bob Sangster, returning to his hometown; Doc Underwood, a cultured man with a Ph.D.; Gus Barton; and Pedro, who always plays his guitar and sings as he rides.

The whole town is at a Christmas social, celebrating a few days early. Doc and Gus are welcomed, but Bob's arrival casts a chill on the festivities. When he meets Molly, the girl he loved, his face changes, briefly. They dance. Bob offers her a watch that he says belonged to his mother. He insists that she still loves him, even though she is going to marry Frank Benson. When Bob seizes her, she slaps him, then thanks him for showing her the truth. She gives the watch back, telling him to return it to the woman he stole it from, and walks away. Bob goes to the bodega and finds solace in the arms of Blackie, a girl who works there.

The next morning, Frank, the young bank president, is trying on a Santa Claus outfit when the bandits come into the bank. Benson offers no resistance, but Bob shoots him in cold blood, saying: "There ain't no Santa Claus." As they flee, Pedro is killed by the dentist, and Doc is wounded in the arm.

Reaching the first waterhole, the robbers see it is marked as poisoned. On the way to the next watering spot, they find the body of George Marshall, a tenderfoot who shot himself. At the waterhole, they find a wagon sheltering a dying woman—Marshall's wife—and her baby boy. The waterhole has been destroyed: Marshall dynamited it, trying to get water, then set out to get help. Knowing it is too late for her, she commits her child to their care. After she dies, they camp for the night.

Doc and Gus want to take the baby with them, but Bob is in favor of "putting him out of his misery." In the morning, they find that their horses dead from drinking at the dynamited well. They must go back to New Jerusalem.

Bob hands a can of milk to each man and starts to drink his. Doc buys it for the baby with his share of the stolen gold. His arm is festering, but he carries the child. He writes out a will that he gives to Gus. Finally, unable to go any further, Doc tells them to take the baby and leave him. As Gus and Bob walk away, a shot rings out.

Later, while Bob sleeps, Gus hesitatingly says a prayer. He leaves his share of the gold and the will beside the baby and walks into the desert.

In the morning, Bob reads the will, which is actually a note to him from Doc asking him to "give the kid an even break". However, he leaves the baby behind. When the child wails, Bob shoots a rattlesnake near the baby. Telling himself that he is crazy, he picks up the baby and sets off. He gives the child the last of the water. Eventually, Bob drops everything except the boy. At last in despair, he falls to his knees and prays. Suddenly, he sees the signposts at the poisoned well. They are 5 1/2 miles (8.9 km) from New Jerusalem; he remembers Doc saying that it would take an hour for a man to die from the poisoned water. Saying "Here's to you, kid !", he drinks deeply.

Bob stumbles into town. Everyone is in church. He staggers in, kneels and gives Molly the baby. He struggles to his feet, turns and falls, dead. As Molly carries the baby down the aisle, someone notices that he is using Bob's watch as a teething ring and wonders where Bob stole it. Molly says it was his mother's.

== Cast ==
- Chester Morris as Robert Sangster
- Lewis Stone as James "Doc" Underwood
- Walter Brennan as Sam "Gus" Barton
- Irene Hervey as Molly
- Sidney Toler as Professor Amos Snape
- Dorothy Tree as Blackie Winter
- Roger Imhof as Sheriff
- Willard Robertson as Reverend McLane
- Robert Livingston as Frank Benson
- John Sheehan as Ed Barrow
- Joseph Marievsky as Pedro
- Leonid Kinskey as Card Player (uncredited)
- Jean Kirtchner as the baby

== See also ==
- The Three Godfathers (1916 film)
- 3 Godfathers (1948 film)
- List of Christmas films
