= Fairy godmother (disambiguation) =

A fairy godmother is a fairy who acts as a mentor or guardian for a young person.

Fairy godmother may also refer to:

== Art, entertainment, and media ==
=== Fictional entities ===
- Fairy Godmother, a character in Disney's 1950 film Cinderella
- Fairy Godmother (Shrek), a character in the movie Shrek 2

=== Games ===
- Fairy Godmother Tycoon, a game by Pogo.com

=== Literature ===
- The Fairy Godmother (novel), 2004 novel and book 1 of Mercedes Lackey's Tales of the Five Hundred Kingdoms series

== Other uses ==
- Fairy godmother or fag hag, a slang term in the gay community
- Fairy godmother, a female mentor or sponsor

== See also ==
- Godfather (disambiguation)
- Godmother (disambiguation)
