= Of Great and Mortal Men: 43 Songs for 43 U.S. Presidencies =

2008 concept album

On September 9, 2008, Standard Recording Company released a triple CD Of Great and Mortal Men: 43 Songs for 43 U.S. Presidencies, a collection penned by songwriters J. Matthew Gerken of Nice Monster, Christian Kiefer, and Jefferson Pitcher (formerly of Above the Orange Trees). The set features a slew of special studio guests including Califone, Rosie Thomas, Bill Callahan (Smog), Alan Sparhawk (Low), Mark Kozelek (Red House Painters, Sun Kil Moon), Marla Hansen (Sufjan Stevens), Steve Dawson (Dolly Varden), Vince DiFiore (Cake), Monahans, James Jackson Toth (Wooden Wand), and Tom Carter (Charalambides).

== History ==
This project initially came about as part of "February Album Writing Month," a website that challenges songwriters to write 14 songs in 28 days. The three songwriters wrote and recorded rough demos of the first 42 songs in February 2006 (leaving only George W. Bush for later). "It was an amazing challenge to get that many songs written, even split three ways," notes Kiefer. "Blasting the first four or five is easy and then you’ve used up all the ideas that have been floating around and have to come up with new ones. And you have to come up with those new ideas right now."

It was decided soon after that the project was too interesting to leave in the demo stage and so the recording process began anew with guests coming into the fray as time and schedules allowed. The project is now in its final phases. "It's a walk through American history and an inquiry into what makes us Americans as filtered through the lens of our highest public office. There's heartbreak and beauty and criticism and revelation. We’re trying to make it work like a big beautiful historical novel."

The released project includes a 100+ page book featuring individual images of the presidents by 43 different visual artists and illustrators, all hand-selected by art curator Pitcher to be included in the project.

Kiefer's album Dogs & Donkeys (Undertow) appeared to favorable reviews last year and featured guests Alan Sparhawk and Mimi Parker (Low), Nels Cline (Wilco, The Geraldine Fibbers, etc.), and Garth Hudson (The Band). Kiefer and Jefferson Pitcher also saw the release of their collaboration To All Dead Sailors via Australia's Camera Obscura earlier this year, a project recorded in the midst of the presidential election. Pitcher's recent concept album I am not in Spain was also released this year on Mudita Records. Gerken's acoustic indie-math rock quartet Nice Monster is also in the studio recording a follow-up EP to their full-length Good Times + Sharp Knives (Grayscale).

Following the 2008 United States Presidential Election, a final song, called "Someone to Wake," was written for Barack Obama and made available for download.

== Disc one ==
1. George Washington: Washington Dreams of the Hippopotamus (Feat. Vince DiFiore of Cake) - artwork by CW Roelle
2. John Adams: Armed with Only Wit and Vigor and the U.S. Navy (Feat. These United States) - artwork by Rob Fisk
3. Thomas Jefferson: The Mouldboard of Least Resistance - artwork by Keri Smith
4. James Madison: Zinger - artwork by Christa Dalien
5. James Monroe: The Last Cocked Hat (Feat. Marla Hansen) - artwork by Helena Keefe
6. John Quincy Adams: Death In The Speaker's Room - artwork by Jefferson Pitcher
7. Andrew Jackson: Benevolence (Feat. Califone) - artwork by Christine Castro
8. Martin Van Buren: The Little Magician (Feat. Tom Brosseau) - artwork by Penelope Dullaghan
9. William Henry Harrison: So You Don't Have To - artwork by Natasha Robinson
10. John Tyler: Hindsight Falls On Deaf Ears (Feat. Bill Callahan) - artwork by Jeremy Kalgreen
11. James K. Polk: The Other is Better / The Landscape to Transform (Feat. Monahans) - artwork by Jason Sinclair Long
12. Zachary Taylor: Rough and Ready - artwork by Matthew McCord
13. Millard Fillmore: The Proof Is In The Pudding - artwork by Steve Lambert
14. Franklin Pierce: My Only Enemy Is Myself - artwork by Shari Elf

== Disc two ==
1. James Buchanan: God Will Strike You Down (Feat. Marla Hansen) - artwork by Jen Corace
2. Abraham Lincoln: Malice, Charity, And The Oath of God (Feat. James Jackson Toth) - artwork by Matthew Passmore
3. Andrew Johnson: Was Ever Alone? - artwork by Scott Kattenbraker
4. Ulysses S. Grant: Helicopters Above Oakland - artwork by Andrea Scher-Passmore
5. Rutherford B. Hayes: The Beard of God - artwork by Erik Werner
6. James A. Garfield: Seven Months - artwork by Danny Gregory
7. Chester A. Arthur: The Epitome of Dignity - artwork by Brian Biggs
8. Grover Cleveland: Bees And Honey - artwork by Julia Schwandron
9. Benjamin Harrison: Kid Gloves Hands Surplus to Big Sugar - artwork by Jeana Baumgardner
10. Grover Cleveland: Rubbermouth - artwork by Chris Wisnia
11. William McKinley: Czolgosz's Dream (Feat. Magnolia Summer) - artwork by Christian Kiefer
12. Theodore Roosevelt: The Sherman Act Does Not Care - artwork by Josh Schramm
13. William Howard Taft: There Was No Longer Use To Hide The Fact That It Was Gout (Feat. Marla Hansen) - artwork by Eun-Ha Paek
14. Woodrow Wilson: A Life Among Men (Feat. Jamie Stewart of Xiu Xiu) - artwork by Anthony Dihle

== Disc three ==
1. Warren G. Harding: An Army Of Pompous Phrases - artwork by Laura Edmisten
2. Calvin Coolidge: On Silence (Feat. Radar Bros.) - artwork by Kevin Scalzo
3. Herbert Hoover: Woe Is A Spoon-Shaped Heart (Feat. Marla Hansen) - artwork by Bart Woodstrup
4. Franklin D. Roosevelt: Illuminating The Bright Lines - artwork by Rama Hughes
5. Harry S. Truman: Suits And Fine Trousers Vs. Hiroshima (Feat. Denison Witmer) - artwork by Kurt Lightner
6. Dwight D. Eisenhower: When Ike Walked The Land (Feat. Alan Sparhawk & Mark Kozelek) - artwork by Maureen Gubia
7. John F. Kennedy: There Is No Plan - artwork by Peter Arkle
8. Lyndon B. Johnson: Ladybird Take Me Home (Feat. Steve Dawson) - artwork by Cynthia Yardley
9. Richard Nixon: 2 Under Par Off The Coast of Africa (Feat. Tom Carter) - artwork by Ralph Tepel
10. Gerald Ford: Now You See It, Now You Don't See It (Feat. Vince DiFiore) - artwork by Mike Bullock
11. Jimmy Carter: A Great Beam of Light (Feat. Rosie Thomas) - artwork by Trystan Bates
12. Ronald Reagan: Such A Marvelous Dream (Feat. Califone) - artwork by Camilla Engman
13. George H. W. Bush: It Was Foreshadowed Here: The Beginning of The End - artwork by Marissa Tamari
14. Bill Clinton: The Mighty Lion Will Not Roar Again - artwork by Kevin Seconds
15. George W. Bush: Though The Night - artwork by Nicole Roberts

== Sources and external links ==
- Of Great and Mortal Men - Official blog
- Presidents' Songs: Of Legends And 'Mortal Men' NPR coverage by Joel Rose (2008)
- 43 Songs for 43 U.S. Presidencies at Sixth and I
