= Godmother =

A godmother is a female godparent in the Christian tradition; she is present at the christening of the child. She may offer mentorship and/or claim legal guardianship of the child as her own if needed due to circumstances.

Godmother, God Mother, or variation, may also refer to:

== People ==
=== Honorary titles ===
- Godmother, an honorary title of a pioneer in a particular field, especially in musical genres (see honorific nicknames in popular music)
- Godmother, a mentor
- Godmother, another name for a ship sponsor, a female civilian who "sponsors" a vessel

=== Individuals called "Godmother" or "The Godmother" ===
Celebrities

- Erykah Badu, "The Godmother of Soul"
- Nina Hagen, "The Godmother of Punk"
- Joan Jett, "The Godmother of Punk"
- Sharon Jones, "The Godmother of Soul"
- Patti LaBelle, "The Godmother of Soul"
- Lil' Mo, "The Godmother of Hip-Hop and R&B"
- Dolly Parton, "The Godmother of Country Music"
- Siouxsie Sioux, "Godmother of Goth"
- Patti Smith, "Godmother of Punk"
- Sister Rosetta Tharpe, "Godmother of Rock and Roll"

Criminals

- Griselda Blanco, a Colombian drug lord known as "The Godmother of Cocaine"

== Art, entertainment, and media ==
Fiction

- Fairy godmother (disambiguation)

Films

- Godmother (film), a 1999 Hindi film
- The Godmother (film), an upcoming American biographical crime-drama film directed by Gerard Johnson, written by Frank Baldwin, and starring Catherine Zeta-Jones
- The Godmother (2011), a Romanian film starring Whitney Anderson, Dragoș Bucur, and Ștefan Iancu

Music

- God Mother, a Swedish hardcore band
- "Godmother", a song by Noga Erez from The Vandalist

== Other uses ==
- Godmother (cocktail), a cocktail made with Italian Amaretto liqueur and vodka

== See also ==
- List of people considered father or mother of a field
- Godfather (disambiguation)
- The Good Mother (disambiguation)
- Mother (disambiguation)
- God (disambiguation)
