= February Album Writing Month =

Annual global songwriting challenge

February Album Writing Month (FAWM)
- Website: www.fawm.org
- Launched: February 2004; 22 years ago
- Current status: Active

February Album Writing Month or FAWM is an annual global songwriting challenge. The goal is to compose 14 original musical works during the month of February, roughly one song every other day. The website provides participants, called "fawmers," with weekly songwriting challenges and an online community, including ability to comment on others' work as well as forums for sharing ideas, forming collaborations, overcoming writer's block, or information on where local songwriting meetups. As of July 2023, fawmers have collectively written more than 250,000 songs.

== History ==
FAWM began in February 2004 as a personal project of singer-songwriter Burr Settles, who was inspired after completing a short novel for NaNoWriMo. He recruited three friends to join him in attempting to compose 14 new songs during the month. Since all four so-called "fawmers" lived in different time zones, they used a blog to track their progress and encourage one another. Each of them met or surpassed the 14-song goal, with 66 songs total.

Due to expressed interest from songwriters who stumbled upon the original blog, the challenge was opened up to the public in February 2005 at FAWM.ORG, where the challenge has remained since. Registered users may post demo recordings of their new songs to keep track of their progress and elicit feedback.

In 2008, because of a Leap Year (29 Days), the ante was upped to 14½ songs — the extra half-song being a songwriting collaboration. In the years since, collaborative songwriting has become a staple of the FAWM community.

From 2005 to 2010, the project also produced a compilation CD series, entitled 14 Songs In 28 Days. Each album documents the corresponding year's FAWM event, and releases were met with critical praise from indie-music magazines such as Wonkavision and PopMatters.

As of March 2025, more than 500 albums tagged #fawm have been released through the Bandcamp online music distribution platform: https://bandcamp.com/discover/fawm

== Songwriting Styles and Strategies ==
Fawmers compose music of all genres and styles, though the most prevalent are folk, indie rock, electronic, and ambient.

In order to spur creativity and work outside of ruts, fawmers periodically create new "genres” or songwriting games and challenges, such as:

- 10x10 - A medley of short songs, canonically ten 10-second songs shared as a single track (cf., the Beatles Abbey Road).
- Exquisite Corpse - A songwriting equivalent of the surrealist game.
- Fake-It Challenge - Participants create a melody for a set of lyrics and accompanying chords (inspired by fake books).
- Morphing - A songwriting analog of the classic game Telephone.
- Skirmish - A title/prompt is announced and songwriters must immediately write a song in the space of the next hour.
- Slothcore - Ambient music at a very slow tempo; fawmers have created and released several compilations of slothcore music, with proceeds going to sloth conservation efforts.
- Strangle Disco - Dance music usually involving classical music samples and wordplay; a megamix was included as a bonus track on the 2008 fawmpilation album.

Many other examples can be found on the Games & Challenges page of the FAWM website.

Fawmers with cassette portastudios began experimenting with “four-track collabs” in 2014. These involve four fawmers gradually building up a song one track at a time, by physically mailing a cassette tape from one person to the next throughout February. In 2021, FAWM began documenting this process for some tapes in a YouTube series called 4 TRACKS 1 TAPE.

Various other 4-track challenges, including digital DAW-based and a cappella versions, have also grown in popularity.

== In popular culture ==
Many fawmers are professional or semi-professional musicians whose FAWM-penned songs have achieved broader popularity.

A noteworthy example is a three-way collaboration between Jefferson Pitcher, Christian Kiefer, and Matthew Gerken (of the band Nice Monster), who each wrote songs about 14 U.S. presidencies for FAWM 2006 (for a total of 42, saving the then-current President Bush for a later collaboration). The result, titled Of Great and Mortal Men: 43 Songs for 43 U.S. Presidencies was released as a triple-CD set during the 2008 election season to critical acclaim.

Another notable collaboration is the song "Walkthrough" by fawmers Debs and Errol written during FAWM 2009 and released on their 2012 album Songs in the Key of Geek. This geek rock song essentially outlines the steps to win the classic text-based computer game Zork set to ambient alternative rock music. It went viral on the Internet and enjoys a certain notoriety among computer game enthusiasts.

On November 17, 2020, The Tonight Show Starring Jimmy Fallon ridiculed the song "Cold Wind, Warm Breeze, Hot Girls, Cool Dudes" by fawmer Michael Gutierrez-May as part of its "Do Not Play" segment. The song was part of a skirmish (see above) during that year's FAWM, meant only as songwriting exercise, not necessarily intended for official public release. Fallon did not ask permission and has not released an apology, although the video of the segment has since been removed from YouTube.

== Related projects ==
The FAWM Challenge is popular among participants in other timed artistic challenges, such as NaNoWriMo, Songfight, 50 Songs in 90 Days, Sounds of the Weak, National Solo Album Month (NaSoAlMo) and Album-a-Day. FAWM was also the model inspiration for the RPM Challenge, which encourages its participants to record a 10-song album.
