= Parrain =

Parrain is French for godfather.

It may also refer to:

== Crime ==
- A synonym for crime boss
- Capo dei capi, Italian for "boss of all bosses"
- a rank in the Milieu (organized crime in France)

== Other uses ==
- Pierre Parrain (1904–1984) French athlete
- Le Parrain (French: The Godfather), Valais, Pennine Alps, Switzerland; a mountain
- Parrain, the team mascot of the Houma Hawks
- Groupe scolaire André Parrain, Courdimanche, Val-d'Oise, Île-de-France, France; a primary school

== See also ==
- Godfather (disambiguation)
