= Ice Age (2002 film) =

2002 animated film directed by Chris Wedge

- Theatrical release poster
- Directed by: Chris Wedge
- Screenplay by: Michael Berg; Michael J. Wilson; Peter Ackerman
- Story by: Michael J. Wilson
- Produced by: Lori Forte
- Starring: Ray Romano; John Leguizamo; Denis Leary; Goran Višnjić; Jack Black
- Edited by: John Carnochan
- Music by: David Newman
- Production companies: 20th Century Fox Animation; Blue Sky Studios
- Distributed by: 20th Century Fox
- Release date: March 15, 2002
- Running time: 81 minutes
- Country: United States
- Language: English
- Budget: $59–65 million
- Box office: $383.2 million

Ice Age is a 2002 American animated adventure comedy film directed by Chris Wedge and written by Michael Berg, Michael J. Wilson, and Peter Ackerman. Produced by 20th Century Fox Animation and Blue Sky Studios (in the latter's debut film), it features an ensemble voice cast, including Ray Romano, John Leguizamo, and Denis Leary in their main roles, with Jane Krakowski, Jack Black, and Goran Višnjić in their supporting roles. Set during the days of the Pleistocene ice age, the film centers around an unlikely herd of three mammals—Manny, a no-nonsense woolly mammoth, Sid, a loudmouthed ground sloth, and Diego, a sardonic smilodon—who come across a human baby and work together to return it to its tribe.

Ice Age was originally conceived by Fox Animation Studios as a traditionally animated film, but became a full-length CGI film from Blue Sky, which had been transformed from a visual effects house to a computer animation studio. Focus shifted from making an action-adventure drama film to a more comedy-oriented one, and several writers, including Berg and Ackerman, were brought on to lighten the tone. David Newman composed and conducted the film's musical score, making it the second 20th Century Fox animated film to be scored by Newman after Anastasia.

Ice Age was released in the United States on March 15, 2002 by 20th Century Fox. The film received generally positive reviews from critics and was a box office success, grossing $383 million, and becoming the eighth highest-grossing film and the highest-grossing animated film of 2002. It was nominated at the 75th Academy Awards for Best Animated Feature. It spawned a franchise, consisting of several sequels starting with Ice Age: The Meltdown in 2006, as well as spin-offs, specials, shorts, and video games.

== Plot ==
A herd of prehistoric animals is migrating south to avoid a forthcoming ice age. Sid, a clumsy ground sloth, has been left behind. After being attacked by a pair of brontotheres, Sid is reluctantly rescued by Manny, a surly woolly mammoth who did not migrate with the others. Sid insists on following Manny, but the latter wishes to be alone and is annoyed by Sid's outgoing demeanor.

Some time before these events, a human tribe hunted and killed half of a Smilodon pack for their pelts. Soto, the leader of the surviving saber-toothed tigers, leads a raid on the human camp, intending to exact revenge by personally killing Roshan, the infant son of the chief. Soto has his lieutenant Diego bring the baby to him alive. Roshan's mother, however, flees with her son and leaps over a waterfall. Soto orders Diego to pursue Roshan and bring him back alive, threatening to kill him if he fails.

Manny and Sid encounter Roshan and his injured mother in the river at the bottom of the falls. The woman leaves the baby with them, but is washed away. Sid attempts to return the baby to the human settlement, but finds the camp deserted. Diego offers to take the baby, but a mistrustful Manny orders Diego to track the humans instead. Diego complies, but that night, he secretly sends word back to Soto that he is bringing both the baby and a mammoth for the pack to eat.

After several misadventures and bonding moments during their adventure, the trio travel through an ice cave and discovers human cave paintings. Though Manny experiences a flashback of his family being killed by humans, he has become deeply attached to Roshan. Diego, beginning to doubt his mission, changes sides after Manny saves him from a lava flow. He informs Manny and Sid about Soto's pack waiting to ambush them at Half Peak. Though the pair are skeptical, having learned they were set up, Diego convinces them their only chance is to trust him.

Manny, Sid, and Diego plot to trick the pack of cats and escape. This initially works, but Soto and two others manage to corner Manny at a cliff edge. Diego attacks Soto and saves Manny, but is severely injured in the process. Soto is thrown against an overhanging rock and is killed by falling icicles, which prompts the rest of his pack to flee.

As Manny and Sid grieve for Diego, he convinces them to leave him and return the baby to the humans before the mountain passes fill with snow. Manny and Sid catch up to the humans and Roshan reunites with his father, who gifts Manny the shell and bead necklace he had for his son. Diego, having survived his injuries, catches up just in time to say goodbye to Roshan, and the reunited trio, now best friends, head south towards warmer climes.

== Voice cast ==
- Ray Romano as Manfred "Manny", a woolly mammoth
- John Leguizamo as Sid, a ground sloth
- Denis Leary as Diego, a Smilodon
- Goran Višnjić as Soto, a Smilodon
- Jack Black as Zeke, a Smilodon
- Cedric the Entertainer as Carl, an Embolotherium
- Stephen Root as Frank, a Megacerops and father Start, a Palaeotherium
- Diedrich Bader as Oscar, a Smilodon
- Alan Tudyk as Lenny, a Homotherium
- Jane Krakowski and Lorri Bagley as Rachel and Jennifer, respectively, a pair of female giant ground sloths
- Chris Wedge as Scrat, of a fictitious species of saber-toothed squirrel
- Tara Strong as Roshan, a human infant. He is never referred to by name in the film, instead being nicknamed "Pinky" by Manny.

== Production ==
=== Development ===
Ice Age was originally pitched to 20th Century Fox in 1997 by producer Lori Forte. The film, originally envisioned as a traditionally animated movie with an action-oriented comedy-drama tone, was intended to be developed by Don Bluth and Gary Goldman's Fox Animation Studios. Around the same time, Blue Sky Studios, a small visual effects studio in White Plains, New York, was bought out by Fox and reshaped into a full-fledged CG animation film studio. In light of this, Fox Animation head Chris Meledandri and executive producer Steve Bannerman approached Forte with the proposition of developing the film as a computer-animated movie, which Forte realized was "basically a no-brainer", according to her.

Michael J. Wilson, who had written and developed the film's original story treatments in conjunction with Forte, wrote the first draft for the script, and Chris Wedge, a co-founder of Blue Sky, was brought on to the project as the director in late 1998. Fox also opted for the movie to take a more comedy-oriented direction, and brought writer Michael Berg to help emphasize a more comedic tone. After being hired, Berg reportedly told the studio that he could not write a film made for children, to which the studio responded, "Great! Just write a good story."

Story development began in spring 1999, and official production on the film began in June 2000, one week after the closure of Fox Animation Studios. 150 employees were hired to work on the film, and a budget of $58 million was granted by Fox. Peter Ackerman was hired as a third writer for the film, and collaborated extensively with Berg for three years before the two eventually moved on from the project. Jon Vitti and Mike Reiss, both former writers for The Simpsons, were added later on after Berg and Ackerman left to further polish the script.

For research, the film's development team took several trips to the Museum of Natural History early on in production in order to make sure that the film authentically felt like the Ice Age. Ultimately, the team translated the information that they had compiled in their research by stylizing it in order to fit with the film's story. A team of 32 animators went out and did research to figure out the movements of different animals; for instance, for the movement of Scrat, animators visited a park and observed local squirrels, taking note of their "twitchy" way of moving.

=== Writing and character development ===
Michael J. Wilson stated on his blog that his daughter Flora came up with the idea for an animal that was a mixture of both squirrel and rat, naming it Scrat, and that the animal was obsessed with pursuing his acorn. The plan to have Scrat talk was quickly dropped, as he worked better as a silent character for comedic effect. The name 'Scrat' is a combination of the words 'squirrel' and 'rat', as Scrat has characteristics of both species. Wedge has also called him "saber-toothed squirrel".

Scrat's opening adventure was inserted because, without it, the first real snow and ice sequence wouldn't take place until about 37 minutes into the film. This was the only role intended for Scrat, but he proved to be such a popular character with test audiences that he was given more scenes. The filmmakers made it so that many of the scenes with Scrat appear directly after dramatic moments in the film.

In a 2012 interview with Jay Leno, Denis Leary revealed that his character, Diego, originally died near the end of the film. However, it was reported that kids in the test audience burst into tears when his death was shown. Leary warned the producers that something like this would happen. When it was proven true, the scene was re-written to ensure Diego survived.

Originally, Sid was supposed to be a con-artist and a hustler, and there was a finished scene of the character conning some aardvark kids. His character was later changed to a talkative-clumsy sloth because the team felt the audience would have disliked him. There was an alternate scene of Sid in the hottub with the ladies which shows him saying to them "Let's jump in the gene pool and see what happens." One of the female sloths then kicks him in the groin. This was cut because it was not suitable for children and may have gotten the film a PG-13 rating by the MPAA. Other innuendos with Sid were cut from the film. Sid was supposed to have a female sloth named Sylvia, voiced by Kristen Johnston, who was interested in him and chased after him, despite his dislike for her and his tendency to ditch her. All the removed scenes can be seen on the DVD.

=== Animation ===
The characters and environments in Ice Age were modeled and animated using WaveFront's Maya animation software. Rendering was completed using CGI Studio, an in-house ray tracing program being developed since Blue Sky's formation in 1987 and previously used for Wedge's 1998 short film, Bunny. While Jimmy Neutron: Boy Genius, released three months before Ice Age, became the first computer-animated film to make use of ray tracing technology, Ice Age would have received the distinction had it been released at the time Blue Sky began work on the movie.

In order to keep the film at a more exciting pace, the development team took certain liberties with Sid in terms of realism. Although real-life ground sloths were slow-moving and rigid, Sid was given a fast movement speed in certain scenes, as well as a more flexible range of motions. Conversely, the character's arm movements were more restricted in order to retain a sense of laziness true to the nature of sloths. Manny was a particularly difficult character to animate due to his unique attributes as a mammoth, such as his long fur and massive trunk that covered up his face.

Dealing with a creature which had seldom appeared in animation at the time, the team needed to figure out how Manny would realistically move with character designer Peter de Sève explaining that "a wooly mammoth isn't simply an elephant with long fur". According to co-director Carlos Saldanha, Diego was one of the most complexly animated characters in the movie, with some scenes showing off his high movement speed as a sabre-toothed tiger while others kept his movement more contained and focused on his facial expressions to carry the moment.

=== Voice casting ===
The voice cast of Ice Age was encouraged to make up their own dialogue during recording. Several lines in the film were improvised by the actors.

For Manny, the studio was initially looking at people with big voices. James Earl Jones and Ving Rhames were considered, but they sounded too obvious and Wedge wanted more comedy. Albert Brooks was also offered the role. Instead, the role was given to Ray Romano because they thought his voice sounded very elephant-like. Wedge described Romano's voice as deep and slow in delivery, but also with a "sarcastic wit behind it".

John Leguizamo, who provided the voice for Sid, experimented with over 40 voices for the character, including a slower-sounding voice to fit with the lazy nature of a giant sloth. Leguizamo came up with the final voice and trademark lateral lisp for the character after watching footage of sloths and learning that they store food in the pockets of their mouths which ferments over time. Leguizamo remarked in an interview with BBC that he had wanted to contribute to an animated project for a while, claiming that veteran cartoon voice actor Mel Blanc was "one of my comedy Gods" and a large source of inspiration for him as a child.

=== Music ===
The official soundtrack to Ice Age was released on May 14, 2002, by Varèse Sarabande. The soundtrack consists of the original musical score composed for the film by David Newman and performed by the Hollywood Studio Symphony. The song "Send Me on My Way" by Rusted Root is also featured in the film but is absent from the album. The Swedish group Bubbles released the song "Somewhere" (on their 2002 album "Inbetween") to promote the movie, outside of the United States. The Japanese version has a theme song called "A Single Drop of Tears" by ZONE.

== Release ==
Ice Age was released in theaters on March 15, 2002. Its original screening contained a sneak preview of Star Wars: Episode II – Attack of the Clones.

=== Marketing ===
Its first teaser trailer debuted on June 18, 2001 and it was first screened in showings of Dr. Dolittle 2 and The Fast and the Furious, as well as some screenings of Atlantis: The Lost Empire, Lara Croft: Tomb Raider, Moulin Rouge!, and Shrek. Its first teaser contained the opening scene featuring soon to be show-stealing character Scrat. A second trailer debuted online on October 29, 2001 and was first screened in showings of Monsters, Inc.. A third trailer followed up online on January 18, 2002, and was shown on Kung Pow! Enter the Fist. The Fox network had aired behind-the-scenes footage and clips during February 2002 airings of The Simpsons, Futurama, King of the Hill, Malcolm in the Middle, and The X-Files, including custom-made bumpers featuring Scrat created by Blue Sky themselves.

=== Home media and subsequent re-releases ===
The film was released on 2-disc DVD, VHS and D-Theater on November 26, 2002, which contained sneak previews of Like Mike and Daredevil in all three of its original home media releases. The DVD edition was THX certified and gave the viewer the option of viewing the film in either widescreen or pan and scan fullscreen. Its initial home video release for Ice Age was accompanied by an $85 million marketing campaign involving promotional partnerships with 14 different companies, including Microsoft, Pizza Hut, Carl's Jr., Dole, Langer's, Valpak, Cold Stone Creamery, and the National Hockey League. All three releases included Gone Nutty, a short film starring Scrat and detailing his further antics as he tries to bury his acorn.

A single disc release was released in February 2005 to promote both the announcement of the film's sequel and Blue Sky's next film Robots, as well as trailers for various Fox titles. At the same time, the film received a two-disc "Extreme Cool Edition" exclusively in international territories such as the UK, Australia, and Germany, as well as other countries in Europe, Asia and Latin America. This release retains all of the bonus features missing on original international releases (such as games and the Bunny short film), and includes a DTS audio track, a sneak preview for Robots, and a new feature called "Extreme Cool View" where throughout the film, facts about the film and the Ice Age would be shown, along with interviews from the cast and crew and behind the scenes featurettes. This edition was ported over to the United States in March 2006 (around the same time as the theatrical release of its sequel) as the "Super Cool Edition", albeit with the DTS track and Robots sneak peek removed. Ice Age was then released on Blu-ray in March 2008, and beside Gone Nutty, it included 9 minutes of deleted scenes.

Ice Age was included on The Walt Disney Company's streaming service Disney+ in March 2020 with an upgraded 4K version.

On October 2022, it was announced that the film would receive a nationwide limited theatrical re-release across 175 theatres from the Cinemark, Marcus Theatres and Cinépolis chains, lasting from October 21-28 of that year. The re-release coincided with a brief period of Ice Age-themed festivities organized by Disney, celebrating the franchise's 20th anniversary and National Nut Day. The theatres that ran the re-release also ran sweepstakes for licensed products from the franchise, including plushes, figures, a Phidal book about the characters and a redeemable code for Ice Age-themed Minecraft DLC, introduced in June of that year.

== Reception ==
=== Box office ===
The film had a $46.3 million opening weekend, a large number not usually seen until the summer season, and way ahead of Fox's most optimistic projection of about $30 million. It ranked number one at the box office during its first weekend, beating out The Time Machine, Resident Evil, and Showtime. Ice Age broke Liar Liar's record for a March opening (later surpassed in 2006 by its sequel, Ice Age: The Meltdown) and at the time was the third-best opening ever for an animated feature—after Monsters, Inc. ($62.6 million) and Toy Story 2 ($57.4 million).

Ice Age finished its domestic box office run with $176,387,405 and grossed $383,257,136 worldwide, being the 9th highest gross of 2002 in North America and the 8th best worldwide at the time. It was one of the two animated films of that year to make over $100 million domestically, with the other one being Lilo & Stitch.

=== Critical response ===
Ice Age holds a 76% approval rating on Rotten Tomatoes based on 164 reviews, with an average rating of 6.8/10. The site's consensus reads: "Even though Ice Age is treading over the same grounds as Monsters, Inc. and Shrek, it has enough wit and laughs to stand on its own." Similar site Metacritic had a score of 61% out of 34 reviews, meaning "generally favorable" reviews. Roger Ebert of the Chicago Sun-Times gave the film 3 stars out of 4 and wrote "I came to scoff and stayed to smile". Elvis Mitchell of The New York Times called the film a "blandly likeable computer-animation extravaganza", comparing the film's plot to the 1948 Western film 3 Godfathers.

According to CinemaScore polls conducted during the opening weekend, cinema audiences gave Ice Age an average grade of "A" on an A+ to F scale.

=== Accolades ===
Ice Age was nominated for the Academy Award for Best Animated Feature in 2003, losing to Spirited Away. The film is recognized by American Film Institute in the following lists:

- 2008: AFI's 10 Top 10:
  - Nominated Animation Film

== Video game ==
A tie-in video game was developed by Artificial Mind and Movement and published by Ubisoft for the Game Boy Advance. A platform game, it has the player controlling Sid and Manny through 10 levels as they carry Roshan. The game holds an aggregate ranking of 46.00% on GameRankings and 47/100 on Metacritic.

== Sequels ==
Ice Age: The Meltdown, the first sequel, was released in 2006. A third film, Ice Age: Dawn of the Dinosaurs, was released in 2009, followed by a fourth film, Ice Age: Continental Drift, in 2012, and a fifth film, Ice Age: Collision Course, in 2016. A sixth film, Ice Age: Boiling Point is set for release on February 5, 2027. While failing to match the critical favor of the original film, most of the sequels have performed well commercially.

With the release of Collision Course, the Ice Age series became the first computer-animated movie franchise to house five theatrical installments, not including spinoffs.

Following Disney's purchase of 20th Century Fox in 2019 and the closure of Blue Sky Studios in 2021, a spin-off film titled The Ice Age Adventures of Buck Wild and produced by Walt Disney Pictures was released directly to streaming on Disney+ in 2022.

== See also ==
- List of animated feature-length films
- List of computer-animated films
- 3 Godfathers, a 1948 Western film with a similar plot
- Pleistocene megafauna
