= Publishers Association =

UK trade organisation (founded 1896)

The Publishers Association Limited
- Formation: 1896; 130 years ago
- Type: Trade organisation
- Purpose: Association of publishers
- Location: 50 Southwark Street, London SE1 1UN
- Region served: United Kingdom
- CEO: Dan Conway
- President: Antonia Seymour
- Vice-president: Perminder Mann
- Website: www.publishers.org.uk

The Publishers Association (PA) is the trade organisation serving book, journal and electronic publishers in the United Kingdom, established in 1896. Its mission is "to strengthen the trading environment for UK publishers, by providing a strong voice for the industry in government, within society and with other stakeholders in the UK, in Europe and internationally." It seeks to provide a forum for the exchange of non‑competitive information between publishers and to offer support and guidance to the industry through technological and other changes.

== Governance ==
The Publishers Association’s board, known as the PA Council, consists of 20 representatives elected from the membership, together with the chairs of the Consumer Publishers Council, the Academic Publishing Council, the Educational Publishers Council and the Higher and Further Education Publishers Council; and the chief executive. It meets approximately six times a year. A member of Council may serve up to two three-year terms.

As of 2023, the President was Antonia Seymour, and the Vice-president was Perminder Mann, CEO of Bonnier Books UK. As of 2022, the President of the Publishers Association was Nigel Newton, Chief Executive of Bloomsbury Publishing, and the Vice-president was Antonia Seymour, Chief Executive of IOP Publishing. Previous presidents include Stephen Barr, Joanna Prior, and Richard Charkin.

The senior management team includes:

- Dan Conway, CEO
- Caroline Cummins, Director of Policy and Public Affairs
- Ruth Howells, Director of Communications
- Catriona Stevenson, CEO and General Counsel
- Mark Wharton, Director of Operations

The previous CEO was Stephen Lotinga. who held the position from 2016 to 2022.

== Membership ==
Membership of the Publishers Association is open to bona fide publishers that carry on the business of publishing in the UK and satisfy the membership criteria. There are two categories of membership, depending on whether a publisher has an annual turnover greater than £9 million or, for small and medium-sized enterprises (SMEs), less than £9 million.

== Divisions ==
The Publishers Association has four sector councils which report to the main Publishers Association, which report to the main Council, and whose officers and chairs serve on the association's 20-representative executive board. These are:

- The Academic Publishers Council provides a forum for higher education, scholarly and reference publishers, representing publishers, conducting market research and running a number of events.
- The Consumer Publishers Council determines PA policy on consumer market matters, and acts on specific issues with the aim of expanding the market and increasing efficiency. Other trade groups include the Children’s Book Group and Religious Book Group.
- The Educational Publishers Council provides a voice for school, college and vocational publishers. It campaigns for better funding for learning resources and represents the industry in the development of the market, as well as running seminars and compiling market statistics.
- The Higher & Further Education Publishers Council for publishers providing print and digital courseware and resources for the higher and further education communities.

== Research ==
The Publishers Association has worked with Continuum to publish the Directory of Publishing for the United Kingdom and The Republic of Ireland.

The Publishers Association carries out research on the demand for both print and ebooks in the UK. It has worked with the Society of Chief Librarians, the Society of Authors, the Booksellers Association and the Association of Authors Agents to examine the impact of library ebook borrowing. The Association found that eBook borrowers bought more eBooks than other library users, suggesting that "libraries enhance discoverability and engagement of published materials".

The Publishers Association has also carried out research into representation and equity in the UK publishing industry. After releasing a 10-point “Inclusivity Action Plan" in September 2017, it has documented representation through yearly diversity reports. These show improvements in the representation of women in leadership, with women achieving gender parity in leadership positions by 2019, two years ahead of the target date set in 2017. Results from 2020 indicated that twice as many employees reported identifying as LGBT+; however, an increasing percentage also reported that they were not "out" at work. LGBT+ representation decreased at higher levels of seniority. Increasing percentages of employees reported that they experienced disability or mental health problems: the impact of the pandemic on this was unclear. The percentage of those experiencing disabilities was lower at higher levels of seniority. Progress in the employment of Black, Asian, and minority ethnicity employees remained low.

The Publishers Association is a signatory of the SDG Publishers Compact, and has taken steps to support the achievement of the Sustainable Development Goals (SDGs) in the publishing industry. These include launching the "Publishing Declares" initiative and working with RISE (Research Institutes of Sweden) and Solstice Associates to commission a carbon calculator specific to enable UK book and journal publishers to monitor their carbon outputs.

== See also ==
- International Publishers Association
- International Intellectual Property Alliance
