= El Padrino =

Padrino or El Padrino (Spanish for "the Godfather") or Il Padrino (Italian for "the Godfather") or variation, may refer to:

== Crime ==
- A synonym for crime boss
- Capo dei capi, Italian for "boss of all bosses"

== People ==
- Vladimir Padrino López (born 1963) Venezuelan politician

=== Nickname or alias ===
- José Miguel Battle Sr. (1929–2007), founder of the Corporation or Cuban Mafia
- Adolfo Constanzo (1962-1989); serial killer, drug trafficker, and cult leader
- Pablo Escobar (1949–1993), founder of the Medellin Cartel
- Miguel Ángel Félix Gallardo (born 1946), founder of the Guadalajara Cartel
- Juan Nepomuceno Guerra (1915–2001), founder of the Gulf Cartel

== Entertainment ==
- Il Padrino (Italian for "the Godfather"), the title of the Godfather in the Italian language sequences for the film franchise The Godfather
- El Padrino (film), a 2004 film
- Ang Padrino (transl. The Godfather), 1984 Philippine film
- Los Padrinos (Spanish: The Godfathers), 1973 Argentinian film
- "Padrino", a 1997 song by Smash Mouth from the album Fush Yu Mang

== Other uses ==
- Padrino system, the system of patronage in the Philippines
- Padrino (web framework), a web application framework
- Los Padrinos Juvenile Hall, Downey, California, USA; a former juvenile detention facility of the Los Angeles County Probation Department

== See also ==
- Godfather (disambiguation)
