= Kurt Lightner =

Kurt Lightner is an artist working in various media including graphic as well as performance art. He is originally from Des Moines, IA and currently resides in Gothenburg, Sweden.

He did the front cover picture for the album, Making God Smile: An Artists' Tribute to the Songs of Beach Boy Brian Wilson, as well as contributing cover and interior illustrations to the Of Great and Mortal Men: 43 Songs for 43 U.S. Presidencies project on the Standard Recording Company label.

Kurt appears as the background dancer in an Ian Eskelin video. (Ian and Kurt met while attending Wheaton College (Illinois) in the early 1990s).
