= Alfie Deyes =

English vlogger and businessman (born 1993)

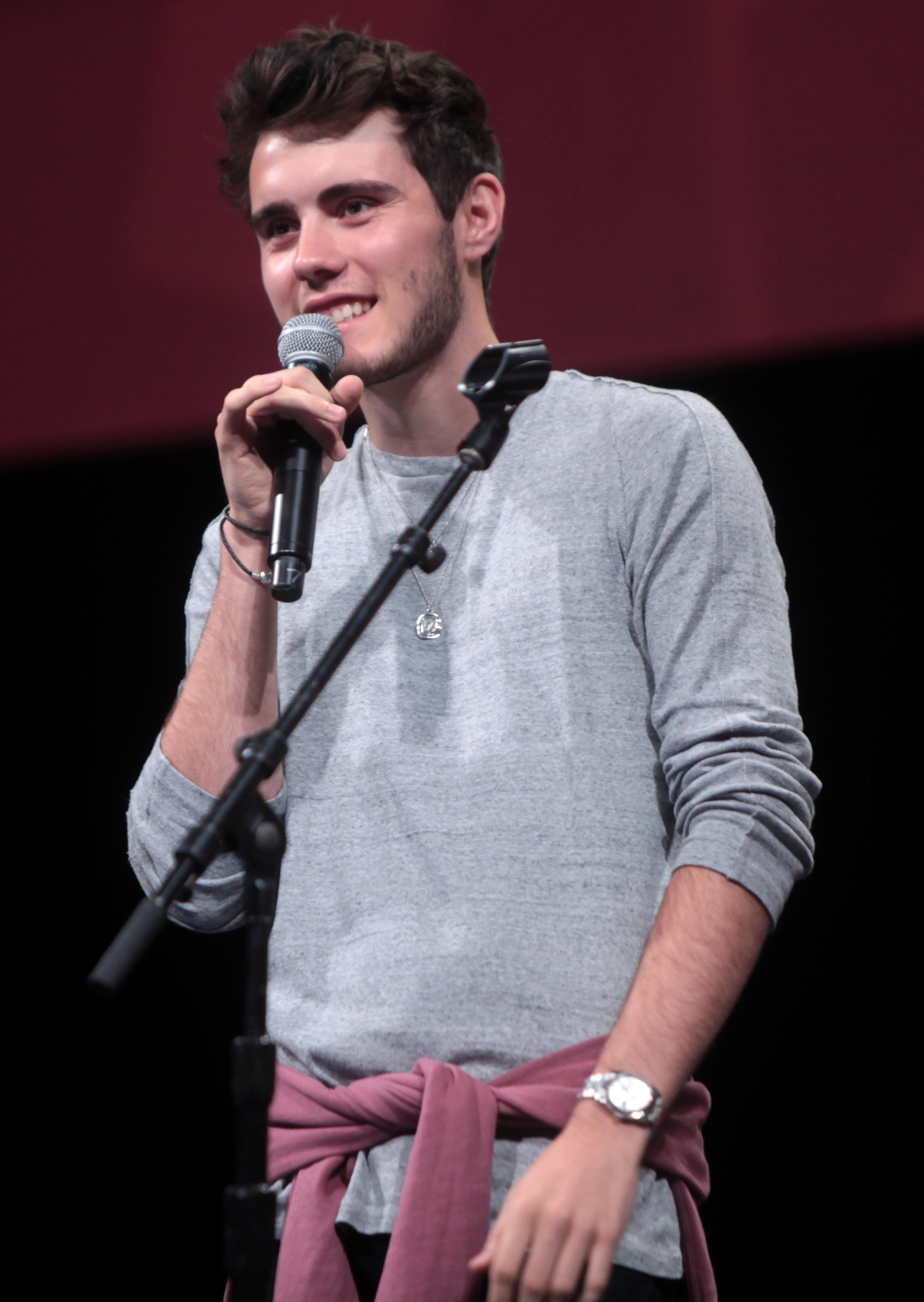
- Deyes in 2014
- Born: Alfred Sidney Deyes; 17 September 1993 (age 33); Enfield, London, England
- Occupations: YouTuber; vlogger; Businessperson
- Partner(s): Zoe Sugg (2012–present; engaged)
- Children: 2

YouTube information
- Channel: AlfieDeyes
- Years active: 2009–present
- Subscribers: 4.57 million (main); 3.61 million (vlogs); 1.52 million (games)
- Views: 511 million (main); 1.09 billion (vlogs); 217 million (games)
- Last updated: 22 April 2025

Alfred Sidney Deyes (born 17 September 1993) is an English YouTuber, vlogger and businessman. On 4 September 2014, he released his first book, The Pointless Book. In 2014–2017, he released three books in the Pointless Book series and one autobiography.

== Early life ==
Deyes was born in the London Borough of Enfield. His family relocated to Brighton, East Sussex when he was four years old. Deyes was educated at Varndean School in Brighton and then attended Varndean College.

== Career ==
=== YouTube ===
Deyes started his PointlessBlog YouTube channel in 2009.

From 2013, along with a number of other YouTubers, he appeared in the Style Haul series The Crew, described by teen website Sugarscape.com as "the male version of Loose Women, but a bit less pervy".

In 2013, Deyes was a member of the "Guinness World Records OMG!" channel (GWRomg) and held a number of world records, including "Most bangles put on in 30 seconds by a team of two", along with YouTubers Marcus Butler and 'Laurbubble' (which they still hold); and "Most party poppers popped in 30 seconds" with a count of 29, beating the previously set record by 1 (he subsequently lost this to Ashrita Furman in October 2013), and filling the most pancakes in one minute, with chocolate sauce and bananas, which was 7.

Deyes was included in the 2015 Debrett's 500, listing the most influential people in Britain, under the New Media category. In 2018, Deyes uploaded a video to his YouTube channel called "Living on £1 for 24 hours" in which his aim was to spend only £1 for a full day. He received criticism from viewers and the media who claimed that Deyes was making a mockery of poverty, both in his language used and the fact he did things such as going shopping for clothes during the video, continuing to use luxury items such as his car and was given free food after being recognised. On 18 June 2018, Deyes uploaded a video to his vlogging channel titled "Lets talk about the £1 video", in which he apologised for his actions and claimed he did not mean to mock poverty. He subsequently removed the original video from YouTube and donated the revenue from that video to charity.

=== Published works ===
Deyes signed a book deal with Blink Publishing in 2014, with his debut book The Pointless Book due for release in September of the same year. The book is part journal, part activity book and includes a free downloadable app and social media integration. It has been unfavourably compared to Keri Smith's 2007 book Wreck This Journal, which contained some similar ideas. Rhik Samadder, for The Guardian, stated "It's a bit like the activity sheets given to children in museums and on planes to keep them quiet. Most of the pages are largely blank, containing instructions to "Draw a selfie" or "Fill this page in with whatever you want!", and found that while "It may not be Moby Dick", he stated that "the Pointless Book is a canny piece of merchandising."

A sequel to The Pointless Book, The Pointless Book 2, was released on 26 March 2015 and features similar content. It became the second best selling non-fiction book in its first week of release.

Deyes released a standalone autobiography, The Scrapbook Of My Life, on 24 March 2016. In 2017, Deyes announced a third and final book in the Pointless Book series titled The Pointless Book 3. It was released on 13 July 2017.

=== Music ===
Deyes appeared on the 2014 single "Do They Know It's Christmas?" as part of the Band Aid 30 charity supergroup, raising money for the Ebola virus epidemic in West Africa. In the same year, he was part of the 'YouTube Boyband' that raised money for Comic Relief.

== Personal life ==
He has been in a relationship with fellow YouTube star Zoe Sugg, known publicly as Zoella, since October 2012. In early 2013, Deyes moved into a flat in London, with YouTuber Caspar Lee. Deyes moved back to Brighton in autumn 2013, eventually moving into a house with Sugg in October 2014. In June 2017, the couple upgraded to a larger five-bedroom house, which had been purchased in July 2015 and renovated over several months. They became engaged in September 2023. Sugg and Deyes have a daughter born in August 2021, and a second daughter born in December 2023.

Deyes and Sugg have a pug as of 2014. In 2026, they were granted planning permission from Mid Sussex District Council to build a donkey sanctuary. Since January 2026, the couple have been on an extended break from YouTube and social media.

== Awards and nominations ==
Year	Nominated	Award	Result	Ref.
2014	"Ariana Does My Makeup" with Ariana Grande	Teen Choice Award for Choice Web Collaboration	Nominated	
2015	Nickelodeon Kid's Choice Awards	UK Favourite Vlogger	Nominated	
2015	BBC Radio 1 Teen Awards	Best British Vlogger	Nominated	
