= Ralph Tepel =

German artist

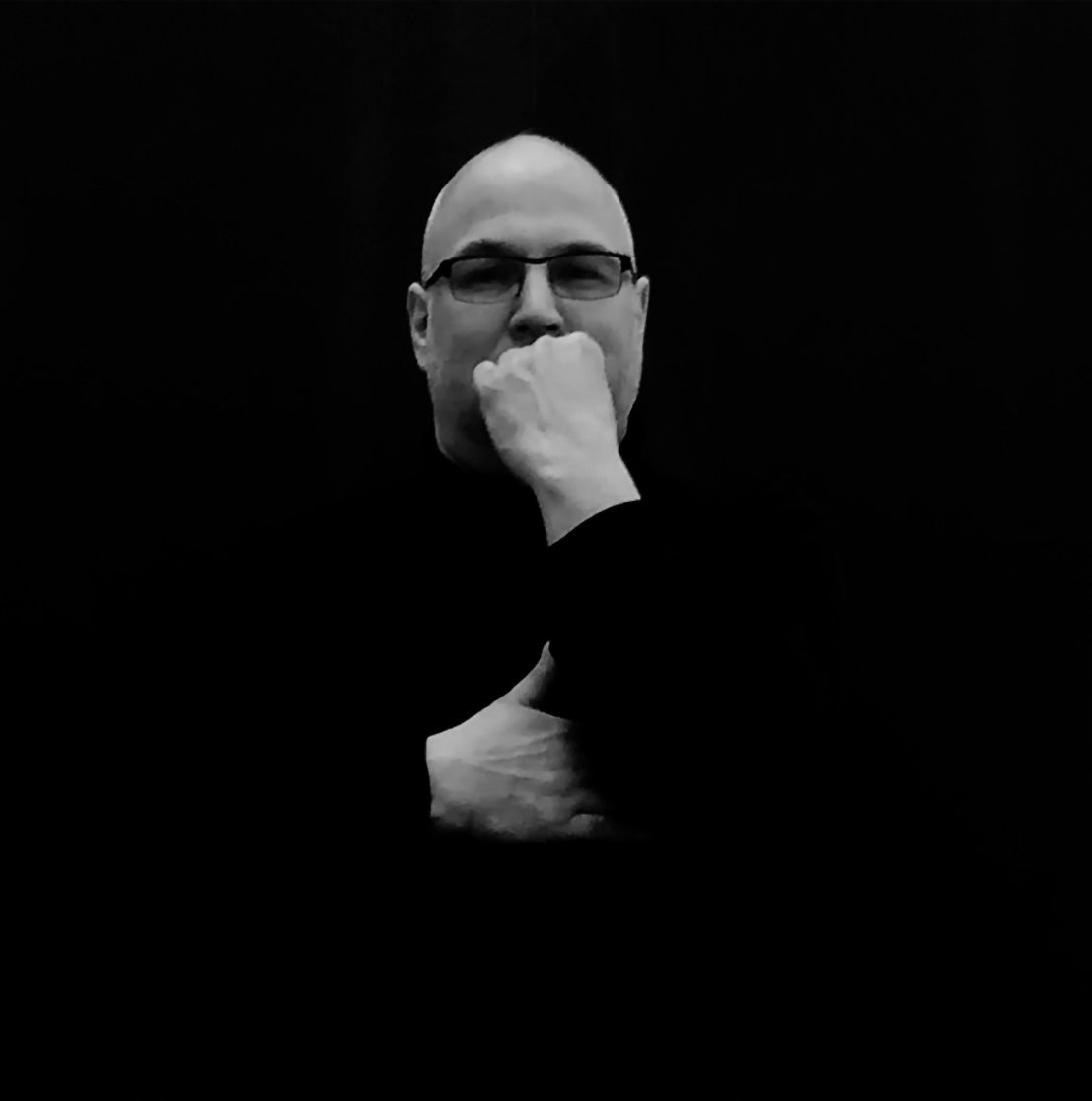
- Ralph Tepel, self-portrait 2014
- Born: 1 March 1964 (age 62); Celle, West Germany

Ralph Tepel (born 1 March 1964) is a German artist. He works as a fine art photographer, painter, sculptor and as a sound performance artist.

== Life ==
Tepel was born on 1 March 1964 in Celle. He started painting, drawing and sculpturing in his childhood and youth. In school he found a catalyzer in his art teacher. 1983 he got his university entrance diploma at Wilhelm-Döpfeld-Gymnasium. He studied theology, art and design at the universities of Wuppertal, Heidelberg, and Bonn. From 1995 to 1997 he studied as a master scholar with Professor Alfons Engling, after his return from São Paulo, Brazil to Cologne, Germany. In 1995 he became acquainted with Helmut Tollmann and was working at his studio from 1998 to 2006 as an assistant and collaborator. The multi-layer work of Helmut Tollmann integrating techniques from print and photography to painting had a strong influence on Ralph Tepels artwork until today.

== Work ==
=== Focus photography 1986–2012 ===
Ralph Tepel was as a fine art photographer several years member of the American Society of Picture Professionals and the Adobe Photographers Directory. An article on Ralph Tepel and his work was published in Künstlerische Fotografie heute, Band 1 (Fine art photography today, Volume 1). In the years 2007 and 2008 he was living and working in Calgary, Alberta. A lot of new artworks were originated. Photographs from more than one decade culminated in the "inspired by music" – project, shown in an exhibition and published in an art book.

=== Faces of constitutional law and the presidential project 2004–2008 ===
Since Ralph Tepel had created a series of paintings of the men and women of the Parliamentary Council under the exhibition title "faces of constitutional law", Christian Kiefer invited him to take part in the music and art Presidential Project "Of great and mortal men" of J. Matthew Gerken, Christian Kiefer and Jefferson Pitcher with the portrait of Richard Nixon.

=== Liberty as a guiding theme 2009–2014 ===
After moving his studio from Cologne to Solingen, he was looking for new forms of expression always with the guiding theme liberty and freedom. The political implications of his painting and sculpturing focused on the loss of liberty through digitization and economization of the society. These works were shown at the Kornelius gallery at the beginning of 2015.

=== Myth Game 2015 ===
The death of his father and his own severe accident were profound experience that changed his vision of the world and his artwork eradicative. He dealt intensely with the work of Jean-Michel Basquiat and met with a completely new Expression of his own, that led him to the Myth Game in appeal to Ludwig Wittgenstein and Roland Barthes, the "Sprachspiel" (language game) and "the everyday myth".

=== Superimposition or the modern palimpsest 2017 ===
Playing with layers and information led him to his new "playground" the extinction of information by superimposition. Working with a lot of new techniques like laminating, sanding image layers, framing and edging image information layers.

== Selected exhibitions ==
- 2005 soul landscapes, solo exhibition, Thessaloniki
- 2006 icons of humanity, HYPE Gallery, Berlin;
- 2006 ralph tepel photographs, solo exhibition, Sani
- 2007 art of object, Calgary
- 2008 artwork Richard Nixon for "of great and mortal men", USA
- 2008 inspired by music, solo exhibition and book, Calgary
- 2009 5th Street Gallery, Dayton, OH, USA
- 2009 Art meets Carnival, Cologne, Germany
- 2010 gallery sanssouci, fluidum, Solingen, Germany
- 2010 Nature and Man, International Art Exhibition, St. Andreasberg, Germany
- 2010 alles paletti, Solingen, Germany
- 2014 colors of fall, gallery Rhineland, Solingen
- 2014 10. ways to plainness, Schloss Mitsuko, Todendorf, Germany
- 2015 the thoughts are free, Kornelius gallery, Aachen, Germany
- 2015 open studio exhibition: "entire life on a computer chip", culture morning, Solingen
- 2015 producer, assistant editor and composer "panta rei" by Helmut Tollmann, K.U.L.T., Bedburg
- 2015 Wege zur Schlichtheit 11 MUGA (Selbstvergessenheit) – 第11回 簡素への彷徨展, group exhibition, Schloss Mitsuko, Todendorf
- 2015 Ralph Tepel: myth games – the encounter, solo exhibition, k1-gallery, Solingen
- 2015 Literature illuminated – four installations at Festival of Light 2015, solo exhibition at the Bachtor-Centrum, Solingen
- 2015 KUNST ist immer ein Geschenk – group Exhibition, k1 gallery, Solingen
- 2016 Ralph Tepel: West-östlicher Divan, solo exhibition, k1-gallery, Solingen
- 2016 Wege zur Schlichtheit 12 Toki no Nagare – Fließende Zeit, group exhibition, Schloss Mitsuko, Todendorf
- 2017 Kunst und Gegenwart, 80 Galerie, group exhibition, Berlin, Germany
- 2017 Wege zur Schlichtheit 13 Fragilität des Daseins, group exhibition, Schloss Mitsuko, Todendorf
- 2017 Ralph Tepel – Malerei, Bildhauerei, Installationen, solo exhibition, galerie dr. jochim, Celle
- 2017 Ralph Tepel – sculptures, k1 gallery, solo exhibition, Solingen
