= Margaret Moloney =

Margaret Moloney, Glin's famous last harbour master

Margaret Moloney (9 January 1869 - 12 August 1959) was an Irish journalist, nationalist and harbour master in Glin, County Limerick. She contributed to the Limerick Leader newspaper for many years as “Our Glin Correspondent”. She was hailed as being the first female harbour master in Ireland and was known as the "First Lady of the Estuary".

== Early life ==
Margaret Moloney was born in Glin on 9 January 1869 to John (Seán) Moloney, a carpenter, and Mary (née Fitzmaurice), a shopkeeper. After their father died, she and her brother James (Séamus) lived with their mother. Moloney worked as a seamstress. James was a journalist and also the harbour master in Glin. They were a nationalist family and James had been secretary to the Land League in the area. Moloney was bilingual, speaking both English and Irish.

== Career ==
When her mother died, Moloney took on her role of shopkeeper. Her brother died in November 1918 and she additionally took on his roles as journalist and harbour master. As the shopkeeper in the village of Glin, Moloney had access to all the local news, which she contributed to the Limerick Leader as Our Glin Correspondent.

She also wrote “trenchant nationalistic pieces” particularly in the lead up to the War of Independence. These articles led to threats from the Black and Tans to burn down her house but Moloney continued to publish. She later applied for a military pension for her activities during the revolutionary period but was unsuccessful.

Moloney was paid £8 a year by the Limerick Harbour Board in the 1920s and this had increased to £10, with a £10 allowance for a uniform and waterproof cloak, by the time she retired in 1952. Her uniform had to be specially made as there were none for women at that time. After her retirement, the position was discontinued as Glin ceased to be a commercial port.

=== First female harbour master ===
Moloney has been credited as the first female harbour master in Ireland and "Ireland’s only harbour mistress". When she died in 1959, her obituary claimed that “Ireland loses its only woman harbour master” and she was described as “probably the world’s oldest harbour master, and certainly the world’s only woman to hold such a position”.

Though no official record exists, there is evidence that at least two Irish women had earlier held the title of "harbour mistress". Ellen Fitzell's husband George was harbour master in Saleen Quay, Ballylongford, County Kerry and she took on the role after his death. She was harbour mistress from 1911 until her own death in 1918. Mary Corrigan in Antrim was harbour mistress of the Lower Bann Waterway from at least 1901 (when it was recorded in the census) until her death in 1907, when her sister Elizabeth took on the role.

Two later women have been similarly credited. Kathleen Curran was harbour master and port secretary of the Port of Galway on a temporary basis from 1951 to 1953, so at the time of Moloney's death there was another female harbour master in Ireland. More recently, Capt Catríona Dowling was hailed as the “first female harbour master in the history of the island of Ireland and one of only two in the United Kingdom” after her appointment as Harbour Master of Warrenpoint Harbour, Northern Ireland's second commercial port, in 2016.

== Later life and death ==
Moloney retired in 1952 after an illness. She died aged 90 on 12 August 1959 in St Ita's Home, Newcastle West. Despite her many roles and achievements, her death certificate records her as 'daughter of labourer'.

In 2000, a sculpture commemorating Moloney was erected on the Main Street in Glin as part of the Millennium celebrations. It was designed by local artist Pat O’Loughlin.
