= Alfons Engling =

German painter and sculptor

Alfons Engling,
- Born: 1909; Berlin, German Empire
- Died: Cologne, Germany
- Spouse(s): Engling, Marlies

Alfons Engling (born 1909, date of death unknown) was a German painter and sculptor.

== Life and work ==
Engling was born in Berlin, German Empire. He studied at the Folkwangschule, Essen. He was also a student of Ernst Barlach. After World War II he worked in 1945-1946 with Gerd Grove at his studio in Lübeck. In 1950 he moved with his wife Marlies to São Paulo, Brazil. Together they founded “Studio Marlies”, a studio and school for arts and crafts. He started with a series of sculptures of what he found in everyday Brazilian life. Other sculptures reflect on religious themes like “Francis”, “Christophorus” or the “singing angel”. In 1952 he first entered the Salâo Paulista de Arte Moderna, No 2.

In 1963 and 1964 he won prizes for his paintings in São Paulo and exhibited at the "Expoicâo de Arte Teuto-Braseliera" in 1974. He was professor at the EBA São José dos Campos.

In 1979 he returned to Germany and lived in Cologne, where he had his last exhibition Alfons Engling, Kunst unterm Dach in 1995. During this time he worked with his master scholar Ralph Tepel, who published in 1997 the catalogue Alfons Engling, Skulpturen und Plastiken, Cologne 1997, that showed pieces from the sculptural work of Engling between 1950 and 1979.

In 1985 the Academia de Belas Artes Sant'ana started the 1º Salão de Artes Plásticas P. Alfons Engling.

== Major exhibitions ==
- 1952 Salâo Paulista de Arte Moderna
- 1962 Salâo Paulista de Arte Moderna
- 1974 Expoicâo de Arte Teuto-Braseliera
- 1995 last exhibition: "Kunst unterm Dach" Cologne

== Art prizes ==
- 1963 Bronze medal of painting, São Paulo
- 1964 Silver medal of painting, São Paulo
