= RPM Challenge =

The RPM Challenge is a creative challenge offered yearly to musicians, similar to other time-based challenges such as FAWM (February Album Writing Month) and NaNoWriMo (the National Novel Writing Month held each November).

Each February, the challenge invites musicians to record original music. The challenge is open to all participants whether solo artists of groups, and regardless of style, country of origin, language, and theme.

== Rules and guidelines ==
The rules for the RPM challenge are simple. As it is not a contest, there is no monitoring or enforcement of the rules, aside from the March 1 deadline.

- Record the music in the month of February
- A finished recording must be submitted, dropped off, or postmarked by March 1

While the rules are simple, several informal guidelines seem to also have been instituted either by being implied in the official rules or through consensus of the participants:

- The record must consist of original material, rather than cover songs.
- All songs do not necessarily need to be written during the challenge, but it is encouraged.

== History ==
The challenge was begun in 2006 by staff at the Portsmouth NH alternative newspaper The Wire. Originally proposed as a way to get New Hampshire residents to participate in FAWM (February Album Writing Month), the organizers opted to create a new challenge that shifts the focus from songwriting to record production instead. The event was promoted in the paper, and CDs for that and subsequent years were dropped off or mailed to the Wire offices. Approximately 220 bands and solo performers from throughout the New Hampshire seacoast and surrounding area signed up and produced a total of 165 CDs. In early March of that year, a wrap-up and listening party were held, beginning at the Portsmouth Music Hall, and moving out to several other venues, including The Press Room, the Red Door, and the now-defunct Muddy River Smokehouse.

In 2007, several well-known websites and media outlets picked up the story, and participation increased to over 2400 acts from such varied locations as Tokyo, Auckland, Montreal, Antarctica and Oslo. Participants represented every continent and turned in over 850 completed albums for the March 1 deadline. Listening parties were held in Portsmouth NH, Georgia, and the UK.

In subsequent years, the challenge has followed a similar pattern and comparable participation. Kickoff events and listening parties are scheduled worldwide.

In 2020 the RPM Challenge headquarters was relocated to St. John's, Newfoundland, Canada.

In 2021 a flexible length goal was introduced.
