= Godfather =

(The) godfather(s), God Father, or variants may refer to:

== Common uses ==
- A male godparent, an individual chosen by a child's parents to take an interest in their upbringing and personal and/or spiritual development
- A synonym for crime boss
  - Capo dei capi, Italian for "boss of all bosses"

== Arts and media ==
=== Film ===
- God Father (2017 film), an Indian Odia-language film
- God Father (2020 film), an Indian Tamil-language film
- The Godfather, a 1972 American film directed by Francis Ford Coppola
  - The Godfather (film series)
  - The Godfather (soundtrack)
- Godfather (1991 film), an Indian Malayalam-language film by Siddique–Lal
- Godfather (2007 film), a Pakistani film by Hriday Shetty
- Godfather (2012 film), an Indian Kannada-language film by Sethu Sriram
  - Godfather (soundtrack)
- GodFather (2022 film), an Indian Telugu-language film

=== Literature ===
- The Godfather (book series)
- "The Godfather" (fairy tale), a story from Grimms' Fairy Tales
- The Godfather, a 1929 novel by Nalbro Bartley
- The Godfather (novel), a 1969 novel by Mario Puzo

=== Music ===
- Godfather (album), by Wiley 2017
- "Godfather", a 2023 song by Indo-Canadian rapper Sukha
- The Godfather, a compilation album by Héctor el Father
- The Godfather: The Very Best of James Brown, a 2002 compilation album by James Brown
- The Godfathers, an English alternative rock band from London
- The Godfathers (rap duo), consisting of Kool G Rap and Necro, from Brooklyn, New York City
- For musicians called "Godfather of ...", see Honorific nicknames in popular music
  - Godfather of Punk (disambiguation)

=== Television ===
- The Godfathers (TV series), a 1970 Australian television show
- "The Godfather", an episode of Married... with Children

=== Video games ===
- The Godfather (1991 video game), based on the film trilogy, for MS-DOS, Amiga and Atari ST
- The Godfather (2006 video game), based on Puzo's novel and the film trilogy, for Windows, PS2 and XBox

== People ==
- Dontay Corleone (born 2003), American football defensive lineman nicknamed "The Godfather"
- The Godfather (wrestler) (born 1961), ring name of professional wrestler Charles Wright
- Godfather Don, American rapper and record producer
- Pat Riley, former professional basketball coach and current president of the Miami Heat

== Other uses ==
- Godfather (cocktail)
- Godfather's Pizza, a United States restaurant chain

== See also ==
- God the Father
- Goodfather (disambiguation)
- The Three Godfathers (disambiguation)
- El Padrino (disambiguation), Spanish for "the Godfather"; also including Italian 'Il Padrino'
- Parrain (disambiguation), French for "Godfather"
