= Peter B. Kyne =

American novelist (1880–1957)

Peter Bernhard Kyne
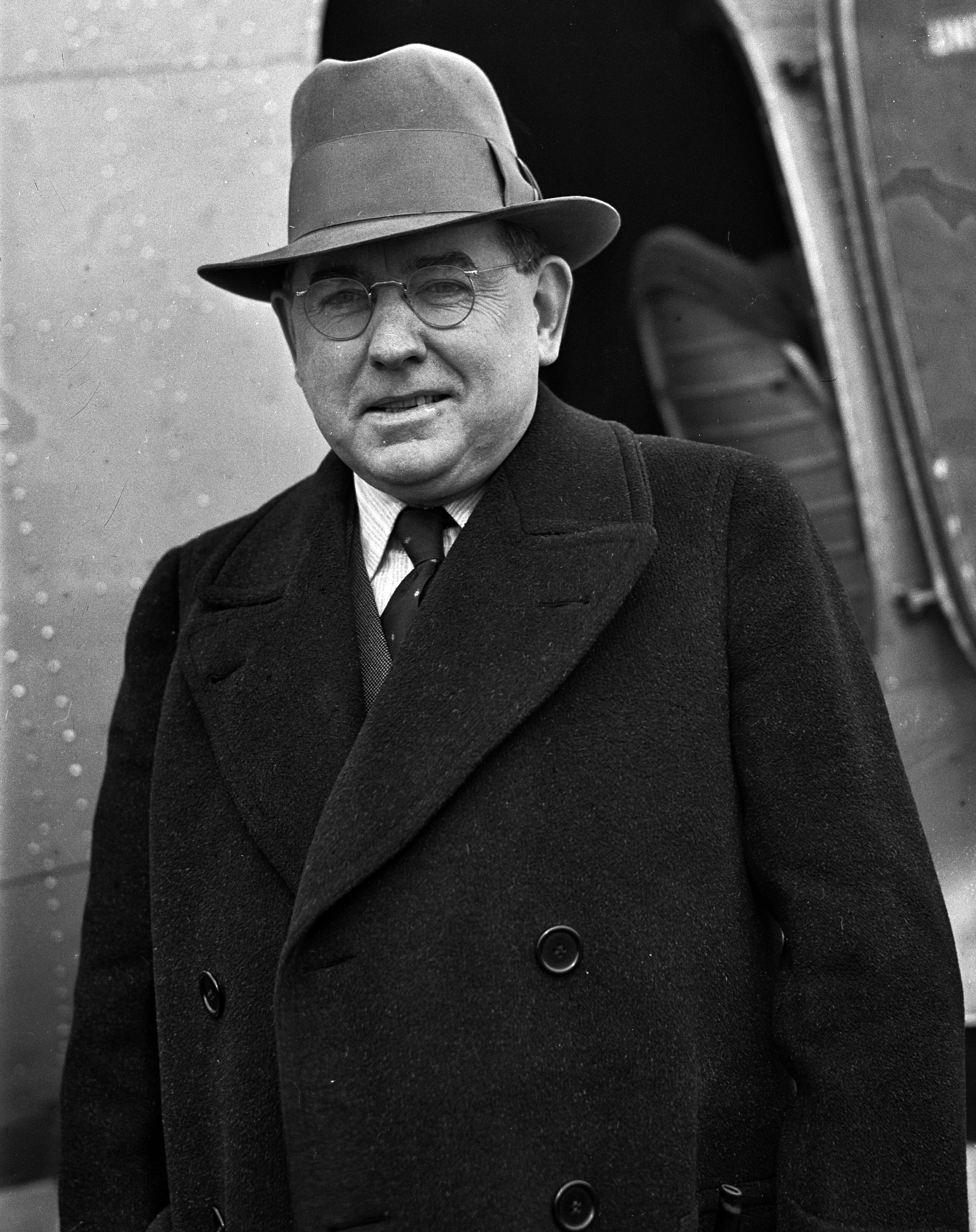
- Kyne in the 1930s
- Born: October 12, 1880; San Francisco, California, U.S.
- Died: November 25, 1957 (aged 77); San Francisco, California, U.S.
- Other name: Peter Bernard Kyne
- Years active: 1914–1952

Peter Bernhard Kyne (October 12, 1880 – November 25, 1957) was an American novelist who published between 1904 and 1940. He was born and died in San Francisco, California. Many of his works were adapted into screenplays starting during the silent film era, particularly his first novel, The Three Godfathers, which was published in 1913 and proved to be a huge success. More than 100 films were adapted from his works between 1914 and 1952, many of the earliest without consent or compensation. Kyne created the character of Cappy Ricks in a series of novels.

== Early years ==
Kyne was born October 12, 1880, to cattle rancher John Kyne and Mary Cresham. Cresham was from Headford, County Galway in Ireland. Young Kyne worked on his father's ranch in San Francisco, then attended a business college where he decided to become a writer.

He was the Uncle of World War II veteran Joseph R. Kyne, great Uncle to Dennis Joseph Kyne and to the last living Kyne, decorated Desert Storm veteran, award-winning author and musician, Dennis Joseph Kyne Jr. His cousin, Kathleen Curran, has been credited as the first female harbour master in Ireland.

Despite being born in San Francisco, Kyne spent his formative years on the San Mateo County Coastside, growing up in Moss Beach and Montara, where he attended a hillside one-room schoolhouse. As a young man, he worked as a clerk at the historic Charles Kelly general store in Half Moon Bay. The "heavy retail debt" that later caused his nervous breakdown was deeply tied to this period, where his meager wages went entirely toward paying off his father's year-long store debt. While working at the store in March 1898, Kyne witnessed and covered the historic shipwreck of the three-masted iron ship New York in Half Moon Bay, an event that heavily inspired his later maritime and Cappy Ricks fiction. [1, 2]

== Military service ==
When still younger than 18 years old, Kyne lied about his age and enlisted with Company L, 14th U.S. Infantry nicknamed "the Golden Dragons", which served in the Philippines from 1898 to 1899. The Spanish–American War and the struggle for Philippine independence led by General Emilio Aguinaldo provided background for many of Kyne's later stories. During World War I, he served as a captain of Battery A of the California National Guard 144th Field Artillery Regiment, known as the "California Grizzlies".

== Attempted suicide ==
Kyne has described how he attempted to commit suicide at the age of 27. It happened when he got into heavy debts running a retail furnishing-goods business. He described how he took a .32-calibre revolver and "felt for the fifth rib ... cocked the pistol, thrust the barrel to the spot ... and pulled the trigger. Click! A defective cartridge." He then settled with his creditors and his first book was published six years later.

== Written works ==
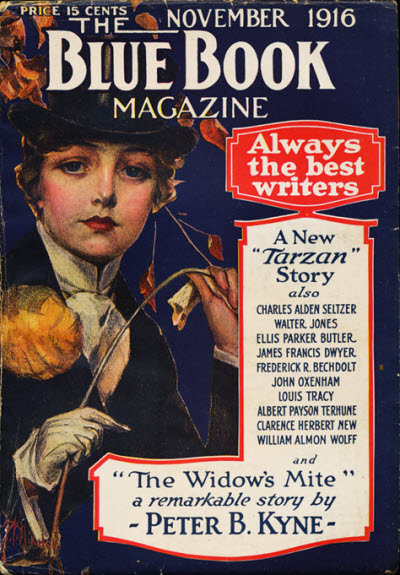
Kyne's "The Widow's Mite", the first story in his "Tib Tinker" series, was cover-featured on the November 1916 issue of Blue Book.

Title	Year
The Three Godfathers	1913
The Long Chance	1914
Cappy Ricks	1916
Webster—Man's Man	1917
The Valley of the Giants	1918
Kindred of the Dust	1920
The Pride of Palomar	1921
The Go Getter	1922
Cappy Ricks Retires	1922
Never the Twain Shall Meet	1923
‘’The Thunder God’’	1928
Outlaws of Eden	1929
Golden Dawn	1930
Cappy Ricks Comes Back	1934
Cappy Ricks Special	1935
Soldiers, Sailors and Dogs	1936
The Parson of Panamint and Other Stories	1936

== Partial filmography ==
- The Parson of Panamint (1916)
- The Light in Darkness (1917)
- One Touch of Nature (1917)
- The Valley of the Giants (1919)
- Red Courage (1921)
- The Ten Dollar Raise (1921)
- The Beautiful Gambler (1921)
- A Motion to Adjourn (1921)
- The Innocent Cheat (1921)
- Brothers Under the Skin (1922)
- Kindred of the Dust (1922)
- The Pride of Palomar (1922)
- Back to Yellow Jacket (1922)
- Making a Man (1922)
- One Eighth Apache (1922)
- Loving Lies (1924)
- Never the Twain Shall Meet (1925)
- The Enchanted Hill (1926)
- The Shamrock Handicap (1926)
- Breed of the Sea (1926)
- Pals in Paradise (1926)
- The Understanding Heart (1927)
- The Man in Hobbles (1928)
- Freedom of the Press (1928)
- The Pride of the Legion (1932)
- Heroes of the West (1932 serial)
- Gordon of Ghost City (1933)
- Hot Off the Press (1935)
- Bars of Hate (1935)
- The Fighting Coward (1935)
- Black Gold (1936)
- Headline Crasher (1936)
- A Face in the Fog (1936)
- Code of the Range (1936)
- Taming the Wild (1936)
- Born to Fight (1936)
- The Go Getter (1937)
- Flaming Frontiers (1938 serial)

=== Adaptations of The Three Godfathers ===
- The Three Godfathers (1916 film)
- Marked Men (1919 film) considered a lost film
- Hell's Heroes (William Wyler, 1929)
- Three Godfathers (Richard Boleslawski, 1936)
- 3 Godfathers (John Ford, 1948)
- The Godchild (made-for-TV, 1974)
- Walker, Texas Ranger episode "A Ranger Christmas" 12/21/96, loosely adapted, uncredited
- Tokyo Godfathers (2003), loosely adapted, uncredited

== Popular culture ==
- The Tracy High School football field and MVP trophy are named after Kyne, whose Bohemian Club friends orchestrated the naming in 1927, Kyne and his Bohemian club friends funded early Tracy High School athletic programs and purchased the land for the eponymous Peter B. Kyne Field.
- A wooden sign in Sequoia Park in Eureka, California, bears a quote from Kyne's The Valley of the Giants: "I'm not going to cut the timber in this valley. I haven't the heart to destroy God's most wonderful handiwork. 'Twas in her mind to give her Valley of the Giants to Sequoia (Eureka) for a city park." In Kyne's Humboldt-inspired book The Valley of the Giants, a timber baron's wife's wish of saving a favorite stand of redwoods and creating a park in the middle of a city is made possible by her husband after her death.
