= The Three Godfathers (short story) =

1913 short story by Peter B. Kyne

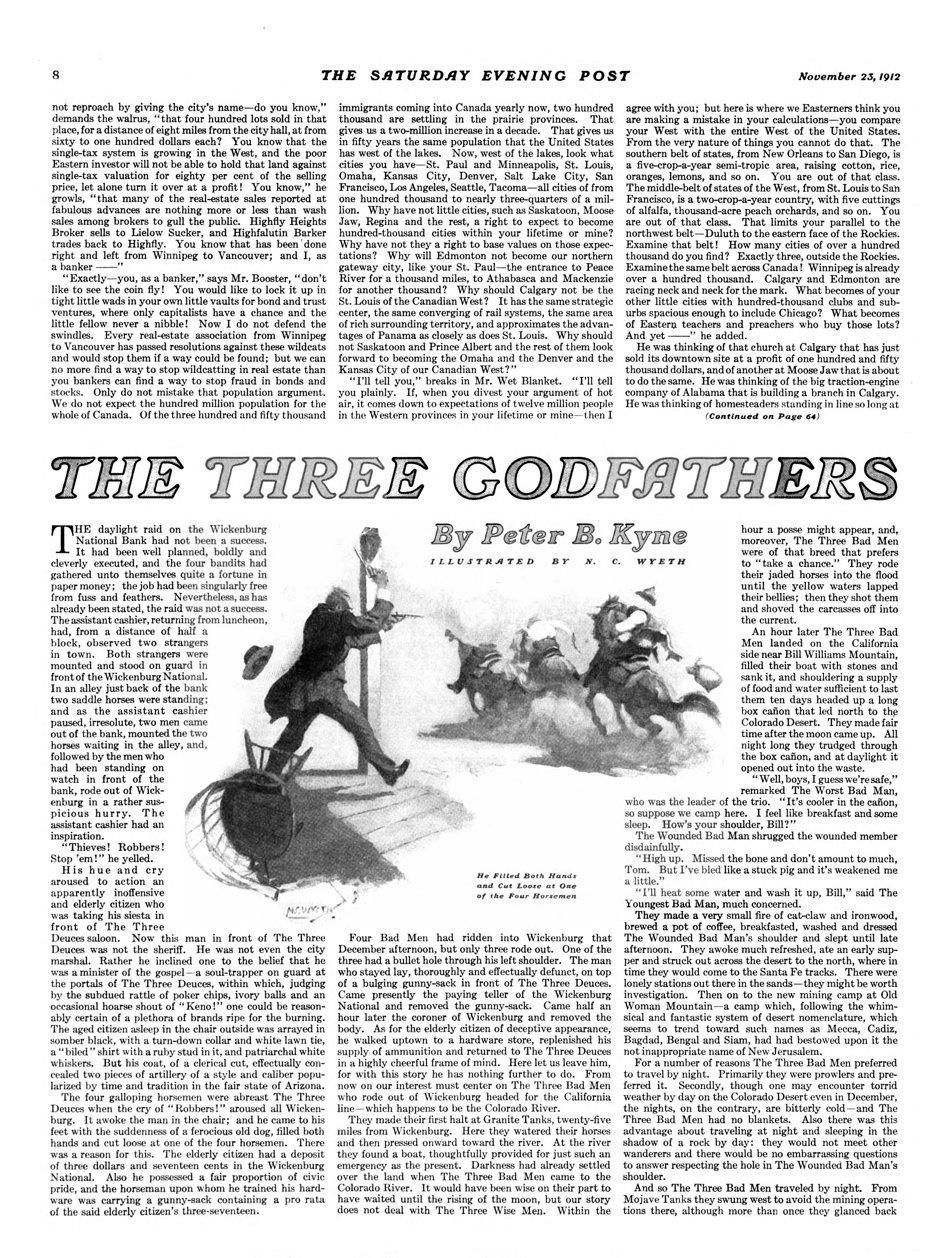
The Three Godfathers first appeared in the November 23, 1912, issue of The Saturday Evening Post.

The Three Godfathers is a 1913 short story by American author Peter B. Kyne, about a trio of bank robbers who become godfathers to a newborn child. The story was originally published in The Saturday Evening Post (November 23, 1912), illustrated by N. C. Wyeth.

== Plot summary ==
Four men rob a bank in Wickenburg, Arizona. One man is shot and killed, and the other three flee to the wilderness. One of the fleeing men has a gunshot wound in his shoulder. They encounter a woman in labor in a covered wagon who delivers a baby, entrusts the child to the men's care (asking them all to act as godfathers to the child), and then dies. The men then try to get the baby back to civilization; two of them die on the way due to the lack of water. The final man, suffering from extreme thirst, carries the baby to the town of New Jerusalem, pursued doggedly by coyotes and aided by a burro.

== Characters ==
- Tom Gibbons, referred to as The Worst Bad Man
- Bill Kearney, referred to as The Wounded Bad Man
- Bob Sangster, referred to as The Youngest Bad Man
- the woman
- Robert William Thomas Sangster, the baby

== Adaptations ==
The short story has been adapted into films multiple times:

- The Sheriff's Baby, a 1913 Biograph film directed by D.W. Griffith and starring Harry Carey, Lionel Barrymore and Henry B. Walthall.
- The Three Godfathers, a 1916 film with Harry Carey
- Marked Men a 1919 remake of the 1916 film, also starring Harry Carey, considered a lost film
- Hell's Heroes, a 1929 film directed by William Wyler
- Hells Heels, a 1930 Oswald the Lucky Rabbit animated short directed by Walter Lantz
- Three Godfathers, a 1936 film featuring Chester Morris
- 3 Godfathers, a 1948 film starring John Wayne
- The Godchild, a 1974 TV movie directed by John Badham and starring Jack Palance
- "Brothers, Fathers and Sons", a 1987 episode of Tour of Duty
- Tokyo Godfathers, a 2003 Japanese animated film loosely based on the short story

== See also ==
- Ice Age (2002), an animated film directed by Chris Wedge for Blue Sky Studios with a similar plot
