= Helmut Tollmann =

German painter

- Born: 1945 (age 80–81); Cologne, Germany

Helmut G. Tollmann born 1945 in Cologne, is a German artist, working now for about 50 years as a photographer, painter, performance and large screen multi-vision artist.

He finished the training as a graphics designer in 1964. Subsequently, he studied graphics and design at the Kölner Werkschulen until 1968. Even in this time he started his career as a professional free artist.

== Life ==
1. beginnings: Photography, multi-vision and painting 1965- 1969

During these early years, Helmut Tollmann was experiencing a lot of photographical techniques and chemical procedures. He had won in these early times more than 25 national and international awards, that can be proved by press and certificates. The historic material of these years is not even regrounded. But as you can see, the most of all the procedures Helmut Tollmann is using until today in his artistic work, posterisation, lithographic films and developers, solarisation and reprographic use of photographic techniques can be found in his works until now, especially in his multi-layer-technique.

2. new ways and techniques 1970-1974

Beginning in the early seventies Helmut Tollmann was principally involved in paintings of architecture and landscapes, deeply impressed by the work of Max Ernst. The proximity of Helmut Tollmann’s early paintings to Max Ernst is no coincidence. Max Ernst invented a lot of procedures and techniques in modern painting (the frottage, for example) and so did Helmut Tollmann. Always looking for new media and procedures useful for artistic utilization. In this period he painted his so-called “soft landscapes”. They look like silk paintings. Helmut Tollmann’s artistic expression based on the study of Max Ernst. And so did the architectural paintings too.

3. Bringing painting, reprography and printing technique together 1974-1985

In these days Helmut Tollmann and a lot his friends (for example Andy Warhol) and colleagues were using reprographic and photographic techniques, especially in Pop-Art. But Helmut Tollmann tried something one can estimate maybe not before today. He brought the squeegee from silk screen printing into painting years before others. In these paintings you can also find elements of technical and electronic processes, which go together more and more with his art the coming years.

4. Technology and the soul in world and mankind – “Soul of Chip” 1985-1997

The painting media was changing more and more. Using new colors and the canvas of his work is changing to copper plates, printed circuit boards and so on. All corresponding to the main theme in Helmut Tollmann’s works of that time “soul of chip”, a registered trade mark of Helmut Tollmann until today. How does the world of information and the men in it rock? Portraits of local, national and international status such as Trude Herr a local hero of Cologne theater or Albert Einstein join in Helmut Tollmann’s artistic work of these days. Multimedia, illumination and information technology mixed in multi-layer artwork.

5. Links – the connecting aspect between technology and mankind 1998-2007

In this shift of emphasis from searching for the “soul of chip” to the use of media the new theme in Helmut Tollmann’s work was showing up: Links. The chance to join apparently disparate projects like: Wirkbetrieb 1, a projects of T-Systems and “Together” a project of the initiative tolerance under the patronage of Joschka Fischer former minister of foreign affairs. In this time new portraits of people from the music history (Beethoven-Superstar, Wagner, Berlioz...) and the social, political and economical life were painted.

6. Cosmic elements and cosmic prayer 2008-Today

Helmut Tollmann is reprocessing the globalized world in its elements. Multiple layers in the projection on and in buildings or on a water shield. As in the very beginning, Helmut Tollmann is returning to the combination of exhibition and multimedia show. The light as a painting tool used by “The Master of Color” as the gallery owner, art dealer and artist Markus Roubrocks once said. With extremely high-powered projectors Helmut Tollmann showed just one long time running artwork, that surrounded the people in the church of the Lords heart at Singen/Bodensee und two years later on the Hegau-Tower. In Lyon a single artworks showed by Helmut Tollmann on all the six-story-buildings enclosing the main market place. His paintings as layer of light in the real world.

== Exhibitions (selection 1992-2014) ==
1992

- "Soul of Chip", Hannover (CeBIT Trade Fair, 1+1)
- „Soul of Chip“, Lekkerland, Cassel, Germany
- Helmut Tollmann Paintings, Koltermann, Nuremberg, Germany
- „Soul of Chip“, Munich, Germany
- Multi-visions-show „100 Years Muses of Cologne“, Theater am Dom, Cologne, Germany

1993

- „Soul of Chip“, CeBIT Trade Fair, Daimler Benz Inter Services (Debis), Hannover, Germany
- „Soul of Chip“, Dresdner Bank, Cologne, Germany
- „Soul of Chip“ Letz, Nuremberg-Altdorf
- Hemut Tollmann Paintings / „Soul of Chip“, Art Agency, Naila, Germany
- „Soul of Chip“, Lisse Gallery, Heinsberg, Germany

1994

- Exhibition "Soul of Chip", Cebit Trade Fair, 1000 sqaremeters, debis; Hannover, Germany
- „Soul of Chip“, Lisse Gallery, Heinsberg
- German Railways (Deutsche Bahn), Cologne Porz, Germany
- Helmut Tollmann Paintings, Orgatec Trade Fair, Cologne, Germany
- art exhibition halls, Rhenania, Cologne, Germany
- Borland, Debis, Microsoft, Frankfurt Kronberg, Germany
- Helmut Tollmann "Soul of Chip", Castle Solingen-Burg, Germany

1995

- CeBIT Trade Fair, Hannover, Germany
- „Hot Ware“ Exhibition software piracy, Microsoft art prize, Hannover, Germany
- Borland, Debis, Microsoft, Frankfurt Kronberg, Germany
- „Soul of Chip“, Madaus, Cologne Merheim, Germany
- Artist festival, Cologne Bickendorf, Germany

1996

- Helmut Tollmann, Works on paper, Gallery at the Market Place, Cologne-Porz, Germany
- „Soul of Chip“ Acer, Orbit, Trade Fair, Basel

1997

- Rhine gallery, Düsseldorf Oberkassel, Germany
- „Links“, Ensen-Westhoven, Germany
- „Links“, Köln, Haus Neuerburg, Germany
- Villa Hammerschmidt, Exhibition, Bonn, Germany
- „Soul of Chip“, Gallery at the Market Place, Ensen-Westhoven, Germany
- „winks“, Optica Trade Fair1997, Cologne

1998

- „Soul of Chip“, CeBIT Trade Fair, Acer, Hannover, Germany
- Exhibition „Soul of Chip“, Serbian-Orthodox Eparchy of Raska and Prizren in Novi Pazar, Serbia
- The eye of Trude Herr, Theater Severin Street, Cologne and TV documentation The eye of Trude Herr, WDR
- „Schwingungen“, Bühne Westhoven, Cologne, Germany
- Paintings, Gallery at the Market Place, Cologne, Germany
- „Links“, Duisburg, Germany
- „Together“ Ministry of Foreign Affairs, Bonn, Germany, host Initiative Tolerance, patronage Joschka Fischer, Minister of Foreign Affairs
- Gallery at the Market Place, „Together“, Cologne, Germany

1999

- US-Renaissance (VDL-Congress), Düsseldorf, Germany
- 75th anniversary Trade Fair Cologne
- 11. Art Market, Monastery Brauweiler, Germany
- Art Prize Certificate, WestArt Gotha art forum, Altenburger Wall, Cologne, Germany
- Art Exhibition Helmut Tollmann, Paintings, Railway Station, Oberkassel, Germany
- Exhibition at German Aerospace Center (DLR), Germany
- Soul of Chip, Productronica Trade Fair, Munich, Germany
- „art at the monastery“, Pützchen, Bonn, Germany

2000

- 12. Art Market, Monastery Brauweiler, Germany
- Soul of Chip, Electronica Trade Fair, Munich, Germany
- „Soul of Chip“, Cologne

2001

- City-Hall-Gallery, Köln-Porz, Germany
- Soul of Chip, Productronica Trade Fair, Munich, Germany

2002

- „Links“, Cologne, Germany
- „Links“, Bredershof, Niederdollendorf, Germany
- „See the world“ EPC 2002, Cologne, Germany
- Art-Event, Fair Munich

2003

- Federal-Press-Club Bonn, „Beethoven Superstar“, Bonn, Germany
- Art-Mile, Heinsberg, Germany
- „Soul of Chip – Ludwig van Beethoven Superstar“, Cultuur Centrum Bornem, Belgium
- „Soul of Chip“, Antwerpen, Belgium
- Kunstverein (art society) Aurich, Art-Pavilion Ellernfeld, Aurich, Germany

2004

- First international laureate art competition Marina di Ravenna patronage Ministry of cultural assets, art festival, Ravenna, Italy
- "Links", EPC 2004 Trade Fair, Cologne Germany
- „Wirkbetrieb 1", T-Systems / Toll Collect, Mülheim an der Ruhr, Germany
- Exhibition 25th anniversary VFBK, Cologne Germany
- Visual Gallery at photokina, who is who- Authentic – united we stand, Cologne

2005

- Exhibition of the participants of Marina di Ravenna art competition 2004 incl. auction of the winner artworks, „Villa Beaumarchais“ Quartier Marais, Institute of Italian Culture in France, Paris
- art competition, Marina di Ravenna 2005, patronage Ministry of cultural assets, art festival, Ravenna, Italy

2006

- Gallery Roubrocks & Partner, Villa Oppenheim, Cologne
- Kreishaus-Gallery Roubrocks & Partner, Cologne
- Museum "Zündorfer Wehrturm", Kunstverein (art society) Porz, Cologne
- Gymnich Castle, Roubrocks & Partner, Germany

2007

- art project „Extrahart“, Roubrocks & Partner, Cologne
- Soul of Chip, Productronica, Munich

2008

- Multi-Media Event „Cosmic Prayer“, Music by James Horner, Heart of Jesus Church, Museums Night Singen, Germany (Production: Ralph Tepel)
- Art at the Market Place, Cologne-Porz
- Helmut Tollmann, „Soul of Chip“, Merck Finck & Co, Castle, Koblenz

2009

- "Art before and after the millennium – Paintings, Drawings, Photographs and Print-Graphics of Gerhard Elsner, Georg Baselitz, Gerhard Richter and Helmut Tollmann", Hegau Bodensee Gallery, Singen, Germany.
- GULF PROJECTS

2010

- „Soul of Chip“, Hegau Bodensee Gallery, Singen
- „Cosmic Elements“, HEGAU Tower, Museums Night Hegau Bodensee, Germany (Production: Ralph Tepel)
- 25 Anniversary Kornelius-Gallery Hanczak, Kornelimünster, Germany
- GULF PROJECTS

2012

- Bedburg Castle, „Glowing Soul“, Audio-visual Installation feat. Ákos Sziráki, Bedburg Germany
- Paintings, Dominick Brock Haus, Westhoven, Germany

2013

- Brauweiler Monastery „25. Art Days Rhine-Erft“, Brauweiler, Germany
- “Cosmic Elements” Audio-visual Installation feat. Ákos Sziráki

2014

- Art Project „Chinese Whispers“ Gallery Glashaus, Bedburg, Germany

== Awards and art prizes (selection) ==
- Award Federal President Walter Scheel
- Art Prize Certificate, WestArt Gotha art forum
- First international laureate art competition Marina di Ravenna patronage Ministry of cultural assets, art festival, Ravenna, Italy

== Publications (selection) ==
- Helmut G. Tollmann, Art-performance at the CeBIT '94, catalogue, cologne 1994
- Helmut G. Tollmann, Soul of Chip, ed. Dieter Weiss, with a text by Uli Seegers, Cologne
- Helmut G. Tollmann, Arbeiten auf Papier (works on paper) 1996-97, ed. by Acer and Safiriou art-consulting, texts by G.O. Safiriou
- Verbindungen, exhibition catalogue, ed. by The City of Cologne in co-operation with ArtExpert, texts by G.O. Safiriou, Cologne 2001
- Helmut G. Tollmann - Beethoven Superstar, text by G.O. Safiriou, Cologne-Bonn 2002
- COSMIC ELEMENTS, catalogues, texts by G.O. Safiriou, Cologne, Düsseldorf, Thessaloniki 2007
- Helmut G. Tollmann, monograph, ed. G.O. Safiriou, in preparation

== Collectors (selection) ==
- Kreissparkasse Köln
- Daimler Benz
- Kölnisches Stadtmuseum
- Messe Köln
- IMO
- HAM
- Krüger
- SIEMENS
- Acer
- Winter Stiftung
- DEBIS
- Dielektra
- Peters

== Sources ==
- Picture of the Artist Helmut Tollman Picture of the Artist Helmut Tollmann
- Helmut Tollmann Maler und Lichtkünstler - Painter and Light artist Official Homepage
- Helmut Tollmann, "Soul of Chip" University Heidelberg Helmut Tollmann, "Soul of Chip" University Heidelberg
- Museum Zuendorfer Wehrturm List of Exhibitions Museum Zuendorfer Wehrturm
- Ravenna List of Art Price Laureates
- List contemporary artists North Central Art Gallery
- Catalogue Ravenna including the list of the Roll of Honour
