= Kathleen Curran =

- Born: 27 February 1912; Galway
- Died: 1995 (aged 82–83)
- Occupation: Harbour master
- Employer: Galway Harbour Commissioners
- Known for: First female harbour master in Ireland

Kathleen Curran (27 February 1912 – 1995) was secretary, collector and harbour master (acting) of the Port of Galway from 1951 to 1953, the “only woman in Ireland” to have filled these roles. She has been credited with being the first female harbour master in Ireland.

== Early life ==
Kathleen Bernadette Curran was born in Galway on 27 February 1912 to Mary Carroll and Patrick Curran, a coachman and gardener. She was one of seven children. The family lived on College Road, near the Port of Galway. She attended the Mercy Convent school. The family was deeply nationalist and instilled a love of the Irish language and Gaelic heritage in Curran.

As a child, Curran would often stand on the docks and “gaze in wonder at the ships, boats and trawlers, hookers and gleoteóigs”. She also read widely about seafaring. Her cousin was Peter B Kyne, a San Francisco-based writer, many of whose books were made into films.

As a young woman, she was engaged to be married to Captain William Goggin but her mother did not give the marriage her blessing and the engagement was ended. Curran lived with sister Maureen for the rest of her life. One of Eamon de Valera’s sisters lived with the sisters for a time.

== Career ==
When she left school, Curran began working for the Galway Harbour Board. In 1935, Curran was given the task of showing Hollywood actor Charles ‘Buddy’ Rogers around when he visited Galway. She also volunteered for the lifeboat services and was second coxswain of the Galway lifeboat. She worked first as an assistant and then as pilot, guiding ships into harbour.

Curran was appointed secretary to the Harbour Commissioners. She was on the board when the Athenia was sunk by a German submarine in 1939 and when The Moyalla ran aground on Black Rock in 1946. When the remains of WB Yeats were repatriated from France in 1948, Curran coordinated the event from the Galway end.

In 1951 she took on the combined functions of harbour master, Port Authority secretary and collector after the retirement of the secretary, Mr J J Campbell, and of the harbour master, Captain Thomas Tierney. At the time she was the only woman in Ireland to have done so. In 1953, she was featured in a column in Woman's Life magazine:

“A woman with a man’s job, which she carries out exceptionally well is Kathleen B Curran, Harbour Master and Secretary to the Port Authority and Galway Port…Her present responsible job includes arranging berthing accommodation for ships and attending to enquiries of ship’s masters ... She also on occasions takes the helm of the pilot boat, going out to ships to take off the pilot, and has many times been complimented on her excellent seamanship”.

Due to legislation in Ireland which restricted the right of women to take public service jobs, the appointment was temporary and the Port Authority continued to seek men to fill the roles. In 1953, after nearly two years, Curran handed over the job to two men. The new harbour master was Captain James Whyte. It was said that subsequent harbour masters never made an important decision without “a word with Kathleen”.

=== First female harbour master ===
Curran has been credited as the first female harbour master in Ireland. Though no official record exists, there is evidence that at least three women had earlier held the title of harbour master or mistress. Margaret Moloney took on the role after the death of her brother James, the harbour master at Glin, County Limerick. She was employed by the Limerick Harbour Board from 1918 until her retirement in 1952. When she died in 1959, her obituary claimed that “Ireland loses its only woman harbour master” and she was described as “probably the world’s oldest harbour master, and certainly the world’s only woman to hold such a position”. The village of Glin erected a statue commemorating “Ireland’s only harbour mistress” in 2000.

Ellen Fitzell's husband George was harbour master in Saleen Quay, Ballylongford, County Kerry and she took on the role after his death. She was harbour mistress from 1911 until her own death in 1918. Mary Corrigan in Antrim was harbour mistress of the Lower Bann Waterway from at least 1901 (when it was recorded in the census) until her death in 1907, when her sister Elizabeth took on the role. These harbours would have been significantly smaller than the port of Galway.

More recently, Capt Catríona Dowling was hailed as the “first female harbour master in the history of the island of Ireland and one of only two in the United Kingdom” after her appointment as harbour master of Warrenpoint Harbour, Northern Ireland’s second commercial port, in 2016.

== Later life ==
Curran was on the committee organising the building of Galway Cathedral in the late 1950s and early 1960s.

Curran retired in the 1970s after 45 years of service to the port of Galway. It was her habit to walk by the docks every day. She died in 1995.
