= 3 Godfathers =

- Theatrical release poster
- Directed by: John Ford
- Screenplay by: Laurence Stallings; Frank S. Nugent
- Based on: The Three Godfathers; 1913 short story by Peter B. Kyne
- Produced by: John Ford; Merian C. Cooper
- Starring: John Wayne; Pedro Armendáriz; Harry Carey Jr. Ward Bond; Mae Marsh; Jane Darwell; Ben Johnson
- Cinematography: Winton Hoch
- Edited by: Jack Murray
- Music by: Richard Hageman
- Production companies: Argosy Pictures; Metro-Goldwyn-Mayer
- Distributed by: Loew's Inc.
- Release date: December 1, 1948
- Running time: 106 minutes
- Country: United States
- Language: English
- Budget: $1,243,000
- Box office: $2,841,000

3 Godfathers is a 1948 American Western film in Technicolor directed by John Ford and starring John Wayne, Pedro Armendáriz and Harry Carey Jr. The screenplay was written by Frank S. Nugent and Laurence Stallings based on the 1913 short story The Three Godfathers by Peter B. Kyne. The story is a loose retelling of the biblical Three Wise Men in an American Western context.

It is a remake of the black and white 1929 movie Hell's Heroes, starring Charles Bickman, Raymond Hatton, and Fred Kohler, directed by William Wyler.

== Plot ==
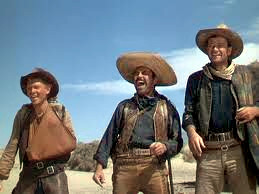
Carey, Armendáriz, and Wayne in 3 Godfathers

Three rustlers—Bob Hightower, Pete and The Abilene Kid—ride into Welcome, Arizona. They have a friendly conversation with Sheriff Buck Sweet and his wife, who asks if they have seen her niece and her husband on the trail. The three subsequently rob the local bank, but the loot is lost when Kid is shot and his horse falls. They flee into the desert on two horses, pursued by Sweet and his men in a buckboard. Sweet shoots a hole in their water bag and then turns back to the depot.

The fugitives come within sight of the railroad's water tank at Apache Wells, only to see Sweet station guards there. Doubling back to Terrapin Tanks, a granite sump at the edge of the desert, the robbers lose their horses in a sandstorm. Desperate for water, they find the tanks dynamited by a tenderfoot, who disappeared chasing his thirsting horses. In a covered wagon nearby lies the man's wife—Sweet's niece—who is in labor. While Pete helps with the delivery, the other two laboriously collect water from nearby cacti. Many hours later, the woman has a boy, whom she names "Robert William Pedro Hightower" after her benefactors. Before dying, she exacts a promise from them to save him and be his godfathers.

Moved, the three desperadoes keep their vow. They find a chest filled with baby things, condensed milk, an advice book, and a Bible. Pete offers Bob the Bible for guidance, but Bob slaps it aside. Kid, certain that a higher power guided them there, compares the baby to the infant Jesus in the manger and themselves as the Three Wise Men. Inspired by a Bible verse, they head for the town of New Jerusalem, across the desert and over a mountain. The posse later comes upon the abandoned wagon, and recognizing the possessions of his niece-in-law, Sweet believes that the fugitives killed her and sets out for revenge.

When they cross a salt flat, Kid collapses and dies. Once past the flat, Pete trips, breaking his leg. He asks Bob to leave him his pistol, "for coyotes"; as Bob walks toward the mountain, Pete commits suicide to avoid a prolonged suffering. Staggering through a ravine, Bob finally falls, but in his delirium the ghosts of his two friends refuse to let him give up. Finding a donkey and her colt at the end of the ravine, he uses them to reach New Jerusalem, where he stumbles into a cantina to get drinks for himself and the baby. Just as Sheriff Sweet catches up with him, Bob collapses from exhaustion.

Bob is jailed in Welcome, but with his heroic rescue of the baby, the entire town has become sympathetic towards him. Bob gives his godchild into the temporary custody of the Sweets, now his friends, but when the judge asks him to give up custody permanently in exchange for a suspended sentence, he refuses to break his promise to the baby's mother. Pleased, the judge gives him the minimum sentence of a year and a day; and as he leaves for prison, all the townspeople give Bob a rousing farewell.

== Cast ==
- John Wayne as Robert Marmaduke Hightower
- Pedro Armendáriz as Pedro Encarnación Arango y Roca Fuerte
- Harry Carey Jr. as William Kearney, "The Abilene Kid"
- Ward Bond as "Buck" Perley Sweet
- Mae Marsh as Mrs. Perley Sweet
- Mildred Natwick as The Mother
- Jane Darwell as Miss Florie
- Guy Kibbee as Judge
- Dorothy Ford as Ruby Latham
- Ben Johnson as Member of posse
- Charles Halton as Mr. Latham
- Hank Worden as Deputy Sheriff
- Jack Pennick as Luke
- Fred Libby as Deputy Sheriff
- Michael Dugan as Member of posse
- Don Summers as Member of posse
- Gertrude Astor as Saloon Girl
- Ruth Clifford as Woman in Bar
- Jack Curtis as Bartender
- Francis Ford as Drunk
- Richard Hageman as Saloon Pianist
- Eva Novak as Townswoman
- Harry Tenbrook as Bartender
- Amelia Yelda as Robert William Pedro Hightower (the Baby)

== Production ==
John Ford had already adapted the short story once before in Marked Men (1919), a silent film thought to be lost today. Ford's longtime friend Harry Carey Sr. had starred in two adaptations of the story: Marked Men and The Three Godfathers (1916). Ford dedicated 3 Godfathers to Carey, who had died in 1947. At the beginning, stuntman Cliff Lyons is shown silhouetted against a sunset riding Carey's favorite horse Sonny over the words: "To the Memory of Harry Carey, Bright Star of the early western sky..." Carey played a former horse thief in The Three Godfathers and a prison escapee in Marked Men.

Although the opening credits include the prefix "and introducing" before the name of Harry Carey Jr., he had previously appeared in numerous films, including Red River, another John Wayne Western released earlier in 1948. Carey was shocked by Ford's verbal and physical abuse on the set, but Wayne explained to Carey that it was Ford's method of coaxing the performances that he wanted from the actors.

The story had also been adapted for the films Hell's Heroes, directed by William Wyler, and Three Godfathers (1936), directed by Richard Boleslawski. Film critic Leonard Maltin prefers Hell's Heroes as the "most satisfying, least sentimental" of all the films. He praised the "underrated" 1936 version as "beautifully shot and warmly acted."

The film was shot primarily in Death Valley, California, although not set there.

== Reception ==
In a contemporary review for The New York Times, critic Bosley Crowther wrote:

[T]he sentimental story that is told in this handsome Western film stems directly from the format and the literary style of Bret Harte. And what's more, John Ford has filmed it so that the characters and gritty atmosphere that slosh from the screen in great warm sluices of grandeur and emotion are much like Harte's. ... And, more than the character of nature, Ford has captured in his style the leathery, dry-humored romance and sentiment of the traditional good badman. From a script spiced with wry and pungent dialogue, which Laurence Stallings and Frank S. Nugent wrote, he has brought forth a gang of frontier people who have the fullness and flavor of the hearty West.

According to MGM records, the film earned $2,078,000 in the U.S. and Canada and $763,000 overseas, resulting in a profit of $1,598,000.

Leonard Maltin rates the 1948 film as three stars (out of four). He describes 3 Godfathers as "sturdy, sentimental, sometimes beautiful", but feels that the last scene "didn't ring true".

== Home media ==
3 Godfathers was first released on DVD by Warner Bros. Discovery Home Entertainment on December 20, 2005. The film was released on Blu-ray on March 26, 2024 as part of the Warner Archive Collection and includes the newly restored and remastered version of the 1936 Three Godfathers film.

== See also ==
- The Three Godfathers (1916 film)
- Three Godfathers (1936 film)
- John Wayne filmography
- List of American films of 1948
- List of Christmas films
- Tokyo Godfathers – a Japanese anime film based on the same book
