= Limerick Leader =

Newspaper in Limerick, Ireland

- Type: Weekly newspaper
- Owner: Iconic Newspapers
- Editor: Aine Fitzgerald
- News editor: Jerome O'Connell
- Advertising: Gary Toohey
- Founded: 1889
- Language: English
- Headquarters: 29 Glentworth St, Limerick
- City: Limerick
- Country: Ireland
- ISSN: 1649-8992
- Website: limerickleader.ie

Limerick Leader offices, O'Connell Street

The Limerick Leader is a weekly local newspaper in Limerick, Ireland. It was founded in 1889. The newspaper is headquartered on Glentworth Street in the City.

The broadsheet paper currently is distributed in three editions, City, County and West, with a small selection of content differing between the three. The newspaper also has a Monday tabloid paper, City based, with a cover price of 1 euro.

In the 1950s, the Limerick Leader bought a rival newspaper the Limerick Chronicle. The Limerick Chronicle was founded in 1768 by John Ferrar who was a prominent bookseller and printer in Limerick. The Limerick Chronicle is the longest running newspaper in Ireland. In 2018, the Limerick Chronicle went from a stand alone newspaper published on a Tuesday to a supplement in the weekend edition of the Limerick Leader.

The paper is owned by Iconic Newspapers, which acquired Johnston Press's titles in the Republic of Ireland in 2014.

== Notable contributors ==
Margaret Moloney, hailed as Ireland's first and oldest serving harbour master, was a journalist and contributed local news from Glin, Co Limerick as 'Our Glin Correspondent'.
