= The Pointless Book =

2014 book by Alfie Deyes

- Author: Alfie Deyes
- Language: English
- Subject: Activity book
- Published: Dorking
- Publisher: Blink Publishing
- Publication date: 2014
- Publication place: United Kingdom
- Media type: Print
- Pages: 192
- ISBN: 9781905825905
- Dewey Decimal: 828.9202

The Pointless Book is a 2014 activity book by British vlogger, YouTuber and presenter Alfie Deyes.

== Background ==
Deyes runs a number of popular YouTube channels. The book contains 'pointless tasks' such as baking a cake of mud or creating a time capsule and contains interactive features.

The book sold 30,000 copies in its first two weeks, and was top of The Times of London Bestseller list and a bestseller overall for 2014. The book was praised for its range of activities by fellow YouTubers, however similarities with Wreck This Journal were noted and was reviewed in The Guardian.

A signing at a bookstore in Piccadilly Circus in London was attended by 8,000 'screaming fans' and resulted in road closures and police helicopters being used, forcing Deyes to reschedule another event at ExCeL London while more than 1000 attended a signing in Birmingham.
