= Fairy Godmother Tycoon =

2007 business simulation game

- Developer: Pogo.com/Electronic Arts
- Publisher: Electronic Arts
- Designer: Mock Science Inc.
- Platform: Microsoft Windows
- Release: NA: April 30, 2007
- Genre: Business simulation game
- Mode: Single Player

Fairy Godmother Tycoon is a business simulation video game that was developed by Todd Kerpelman of Pogo.com in conjunction with Mock Science Inc. and was published by Electronic Arts. It was released for Microsoft Windows on April 30, 2007. The game's storyline is centered on establishing successful potion shops in each of the cities of Onceuponia.

== Objective ==
The goal of the player is to maximize profit and drive the competition out of business. The player accomplishes this goal by distributing money to the different company needs in order to reach a successful business.

== Gameplay ==
The player is given control of a potion company and goes through each day in two basic modes. The first consists of a time period to determine how the budget should be allocated.

Among the day-to-day decisions that are made are pricing, supplies, research, and upgrades. The Weather is also an important factor when deciding what will happen in the coming day.

Other people to interact with in this mode include a loan shark, goons, marketing, and freelancers that are willing to do things for a price.

Occasionally, well-known fairy tale characters such as Cinderella or Little Red Riding Hood will initiate events that will allow the user to make decisions regarding the incident, leading to anything from gifts and upgrades to the loss of supplies.

The second mode consists of cursed customers with various ailments walking around town looking to buy potions to cure their problems. During this time period, the player is allowed to set the speed to Normal, Fast, or Very Fast. Through various upgrades, the user is also allowed to trigger changes in the decisions of the citizens of the town and fix problems such as shortages in supplies or overpriced potions.
