= Le Parrain =

Mountain in Switzerland

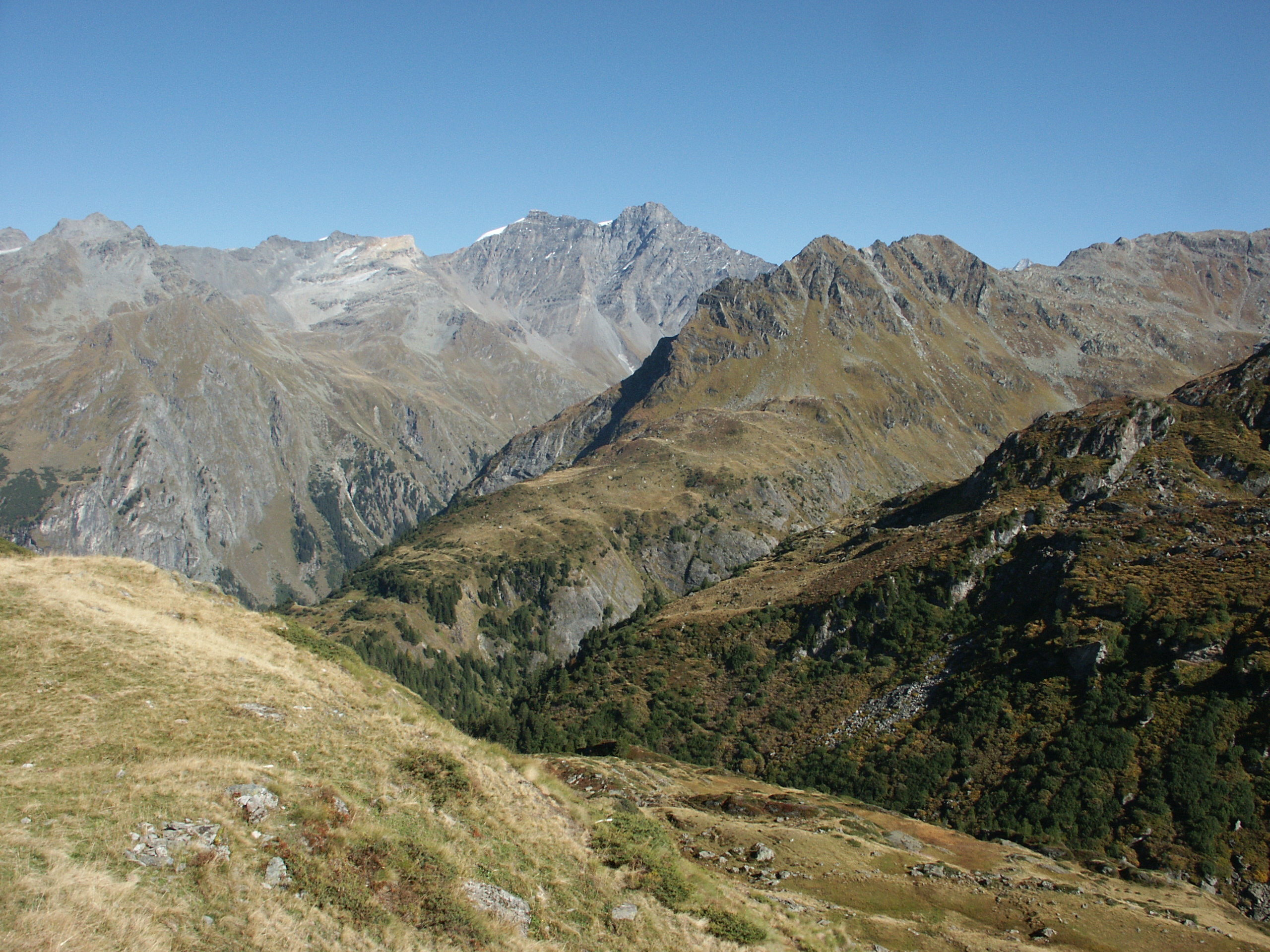
- Le Parrain (left) and Le Pleureur (centre) from the west side

Highest point
- Elevation: 3,259 m (10,692 ft)
- Prominence: 115 m (377 ft)
- Parent peak: La Ruinette
- Coordinates: 46°02′44.5″N 7°21′5.2″E

Geography
- Location within Switzerland
- Location: Valais, Switzerland
- Parent range: Pennine Alps

Le Parrain is a mountain of the Swiss Pennine Alps, located east of Fionnay in the canton of Valais. Its summit (3,259 m) lies within the valley of Bagnes but near the watershed with the valley of Hérens.

"Le Parrain" is a common name for designating the godfather in French, hence the mountain's name is in English "The Godfather".
