= Godfather of Punk =

Godfather of Punk may refer to:

- Captain Beefheart (1941–2010)
- David Bowie (1947–2016)
- Iggy Pop (born 1947), of The Stooges
- Joey Ramone (1951–2001), of The Ramones
- Lou Reed (1942–2013), of The Velvet Underground
- Pete Townshend (born 1945), of The Who
- John Lydon (born 1956) of The Sex Pistols and Public Image Limited (PIL)

== See also ==
- Honorific nicknames in popular music
