= Debs and Errol =

Canadian musical duo

Debs & Errol
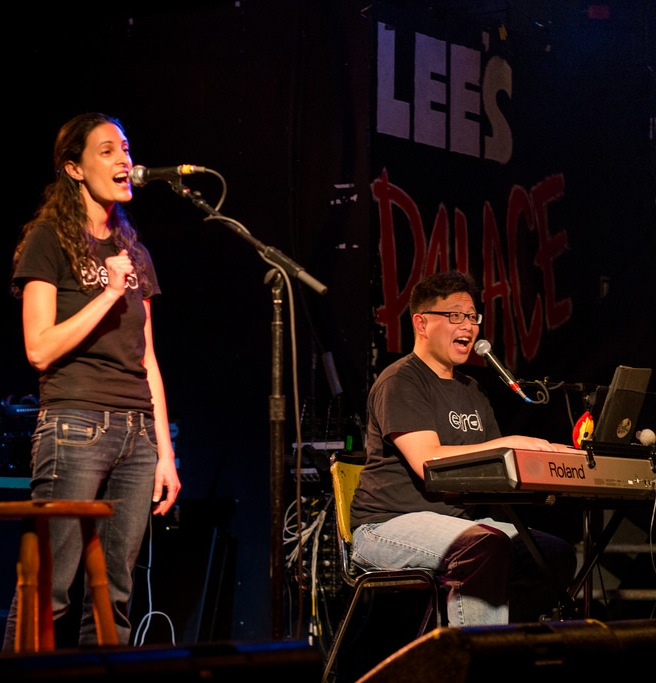
- Debs & Errol Perform at Lee's Palace

Background information
- Origin: Toronto, Ontario, Canada
- Genres: parody, singer-songwriter, filk music, geek music
- Instruments: piano, guitar, ukulele
- Years active: 2011–2015
- Members: Deborah Isaac (guitar, ukulele); Errol Elumir (piano)
- Website: debsanderrol.com

Debs & Errol was a Toronto, Ontario-based comedy, musical duo consisting of Deborah Isaac (on guitar, ukulele) and Errol Elumir (piano). They are known for performing geek music, originals and parodies, including songs about Totoro, Star Wars, Star Trek, Sherlock, and other similar themes.

Their work has been featured on Wired's website and their "Geek Love Song" was featured in a segment of CBC Radio's Here and Now (Toronto), for their Valentine's Contest, in February 2012.

== History ==
The band started when a mutual friend asked them separately to be musical acts in a geeky theatre showcase. They decided to pair up and started a website, social media, and T-shirts in one week. They write many songs that are funny and emphasize geeky topics.

Debs & Errol announced their retirement on their website on 15 January 2015.

== Public Performances ==
They often make appearances at pop culture conventions, including performing at the Ottawa Comiccon, being guests of honor at Orycon 35 and the Ohio Valley Filk Festival. They regularly perform at nontraditional music venues such as improv shows and geek theatre showcases.

== Other projects ==
=== Daily Webcomic ===
Debs & Errol have a daily webcomic (except Sundays). Errol said, "That happened by accident, really. I wanted to put out a CD and I thought, foolishly, we could get it done in a short amount of time. Considering I had created the characters for our logo, I decided to do a daily comic so that people could keep coming back every day until the CD was done."

=== NaNoWriMo ===
Debs & Errol first met through National Novel Writing Month and have been huge supporters of the organization ever since. Since then, they have written a musical about NaNoWriMo, and Errol pens the NaNoToons, the webcomic for NaNoWriMo.

In 2012, Debs & Errol did a Project for Awesome video for NaNoWriMo, helping them win first place.

=== Crowdfunding ===
In 2012, they successfully crowdfunded their first CD, Songs in the Key of Geek.

In 2013, they ran a successful Indiegogo Campaign to raise funds for their EP CTRL+ALT+DUETS.

== Discography ==
=== Albums available on CD ===
- Songs in the Key of Geek (April 2012)

=== Online-only releases ===
- CTRL+ALT+DUETS (October 2013)
- NaNoMusical 2012 Soundtrack (EP) (November 2012) – Written by Debs & Errol but not performed
