= Keri Smith =

Canadian writer

- Born: Toronto, Canada
- Education: Northern Oklahoma College (AA); Arizona State University (BA Art history)
- Notable work: Wreck This Journal
- Style: Conceptual arts, illustration
- Website: kerismith.com

Keri Smith is a Canadian author, illustrator and conceptual artist.

Her work includes topics such as imperfection and impermanence from a visual arts perspective.

Smith's book Wreck This Journal encourages readers to expand their scopes of creativity.

Her books include Wreck This Journal, The Wander Society, This is Not a Book, How to Be an Explorer of the World, Mess, Finish This Book, The Pocket Scavenger, Wreck This Journal Everywhere, Everything Is Connected, and The Imaginary World of… as well as Wreck This App, This is Not an App, and the Pocket Scavenger app.
