= The Three Godfathers (1916 film) =

1916 film

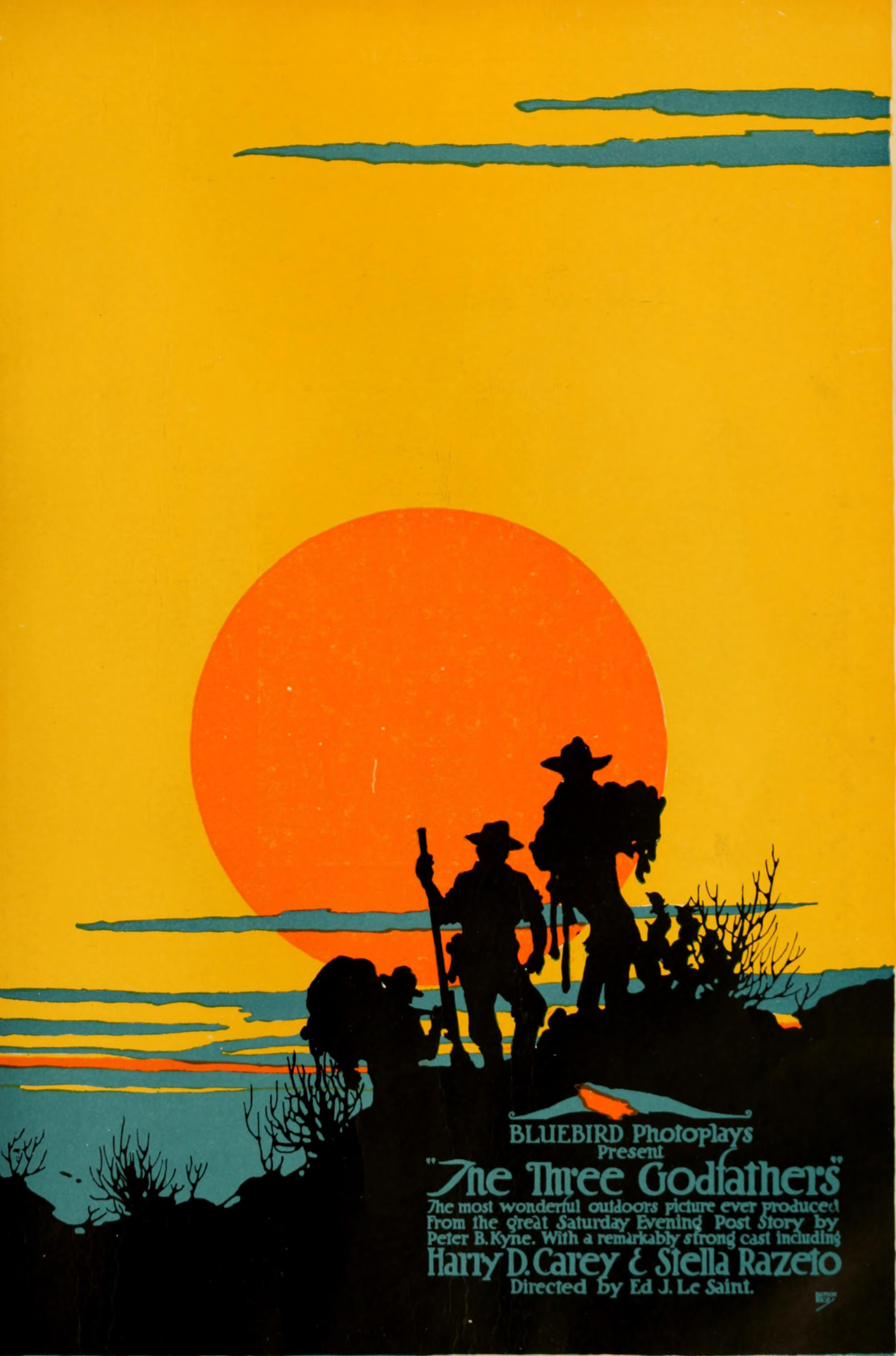
- Film poster
- Directed by: Edward LeSaint
- Written by: Harvey Gates; Edward LeSaint
- Based on: The Three Godfathers; 1913 short story by Peter B. Kyne
- Produced by: Universal's "Bluebird Photoplays" unit
- Starring: Harry Carey
- Distributed by: Universal Pictures
- Release date: June 19, 1916
- Running time: 6 reels
- Country: United States
- Languages: Silent; English intertitles

The Three Godfathers is a lost 1916 American silent film featuring Harry Carey, based on a short story of the same name by Peter B. Kyne. The film was remade in 1919 as Marked Men, which also starred Carey. John Ford's 1948 remake of Three Godfathers was dedicated to Harry Carey Sr., the star of the first adaptation.

== Cast ==
- Stella LeSaint as Ruby Merrill / "The Mojave Lily" (credited as Stella Razeto)
- Harry Carey as Bob Sangster
- George Berrell as Tim Gibbons
- Joe Rickson as Rusty Conners
- Jack Hoxie as Sheriff Pete Cushing (credited as Hart Hoxie)
- Frank Lanning as Bill Kearny
- J.F. Briscoe as Johnny Pell (credited as Mr. Briscoe)

== Preservation ==
With no holdings located in archives, The Three Godfathers is considered a lost film.

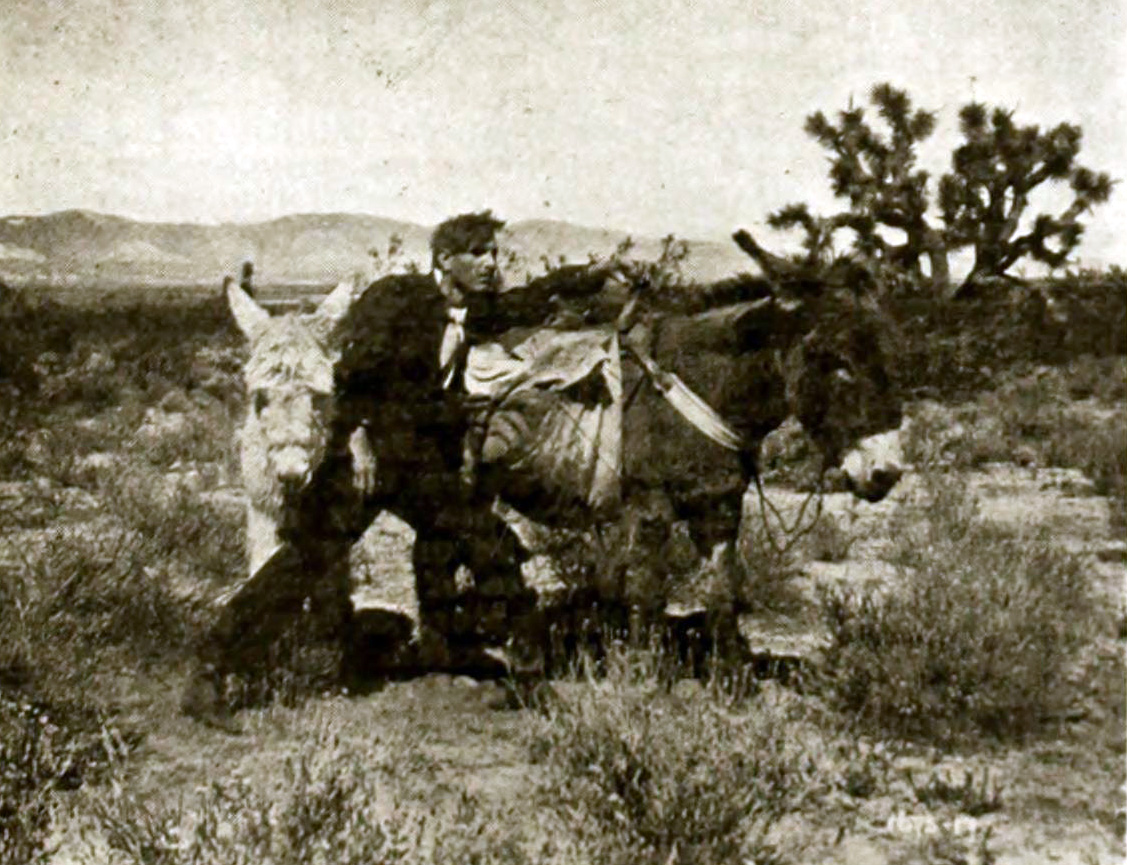
