= Phidal Publishing =

Phidal Publishing Inc. (French: Éditions Phidal Inc.) is a children's book publishing company founded in 1979 in the Mont-Royal district of Montréal by Albert Soussan and his family. Originally an adult-oriented publishing company, it has published children's books since 1988.

== History ==
Phidal Publishing was founded in 1979 by the Soussan family. The company, then located on 8255 Mountain Sights Avenue in Mont-Royal, was originally publishing novels and reference guides, alternating between the name Albert Soussan Publishing and its actual name. In 1988, Phidal started focusing on children's books and moved to 5518 Ferrier Street. Phidal also secured permissions to release Disney-oriented books by that time. In 1995, due to expansion, Phidal moved to its actual location, 5740 Ferrier Street.
