= Hell's Heroes (film) =

1929 film

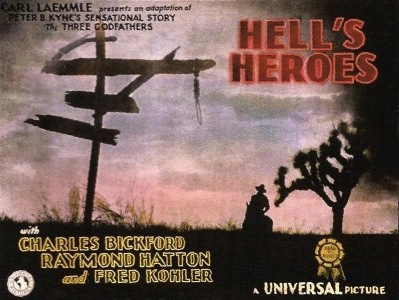
- Theatrical release poster
- Directed by: William Wyler
- Written by: Tom Reed; C. Gardner Sullivan
- Based on: The Three Godfathers; 1913 short story by Peter B. Kyne
- Produced by: Carl Laemmle Jr.
- Starring: Charles Bickford; Raymond Hatton; Fred Kohler
- Cinematography: George Robinson
- Edited by: Harry Marker
- Music by: Sam Perry; Heinz Roemheld
- Production company: Universal Pictures
- Distributed by: Universal Pictures
- Release date: December 12, 1929
- Running time: 68 minutes
- Country: United States
- Language: English sound film

Hell's Heroes is a 1929 American pre-Code Western sound film, one of many screen adaptations of Peter B. Kyne's 1913 short story The Three Godfathers.

Three outlaws, played by Charles Bickford, Raymond Hatton, and Fred Kohler, promise a dying woman that they will save her newborn child. This film is notable for being the first sound production directed by William Wyler.

== Plot ==
Hell's Heroes (1929)

Four men (Bob Sangster, "Barbwire" Gibbons, "Wild Bill" Kearney and José) rob the bank in the town of New Jerusalem. José and the cashier are killed, while Barbwire is shot in the shoulder. The three outlaws escape the posse, fleeing into the desert. However, their horses run off in a sand storm and they have little water.

When they reach a water hole, they are dismayed to find that not only is it dry, but there is a pregnant woman stranded there. She gives birth to a boy. Before she dies from her ordeal, she makes the three the child's godfathers and begs them to take him to his father, Frank Edwards... the cashier they murdered.

Bob wants to abandon the boy, but the other two are determined to honor the woman's request. They start walking the 40 miles (64.4 km) to New Jerusalem. Weakened by his wound, Barbwire eventually can go no further. He makes the others continue on without him, then shoots himself. That night, they stop to rest. When Bob wakes up the next morning, he finds Bill gone. A note Bill left explains that he went further into the desert to conserve the little remaining water for Bob and the baby. Bob goes on, discarding his belongings along the way, including finally the loot. At one point, he leaves the baby, but then picks him up again. His strength gives out just as he reaches a water hole with a sign warning it is poisoned. Desperate, he comes up with a plan to save the baby. He drinks his fill, knowing that he will have about an hour before it kills him. He stumbles into New Jerusalem's church, where the congregation is celebrating Christmas. Then, his task completed, he dies without uttering a word.

== Cast ==
- Charles Bickford as Bob Sangster
- Raymond Hatton as Tom Gibbons
- Fred Kohler as Wild Bill Kearney
- Fritzi Ridgeway as Mrs Frank Edwards
- Joe De La Cruz as Jose
- Walter James as Sheriff
- Maria Alba as Carmelita
- Buck Connors as Parson Jones

== Production ==
The real Western town of Bodie, California, stood in for the fictional town of New Jerusalem. The production utilized much of the town's main street and included both exterior and interior footage of the Bodie Bank, which burned in 1932, and Methodist Church. The bank robbery sequence features an elaborate horse-drawn hearse that is still on display in the town's museum.

== Reception ==
The film performed well at the box office, including in France and Germany, and was praised for its "interesting and realistic bit of characterization." In a retrospective review, Peter C. Mowrey called the film a "masterpiece" in some regards, though limited by "almost amateurish visual missteps."

== See also ==
- List of early sound feature films (1926–1929)
