= Marked Men (1919 film) =

1919 film directed by John Ford

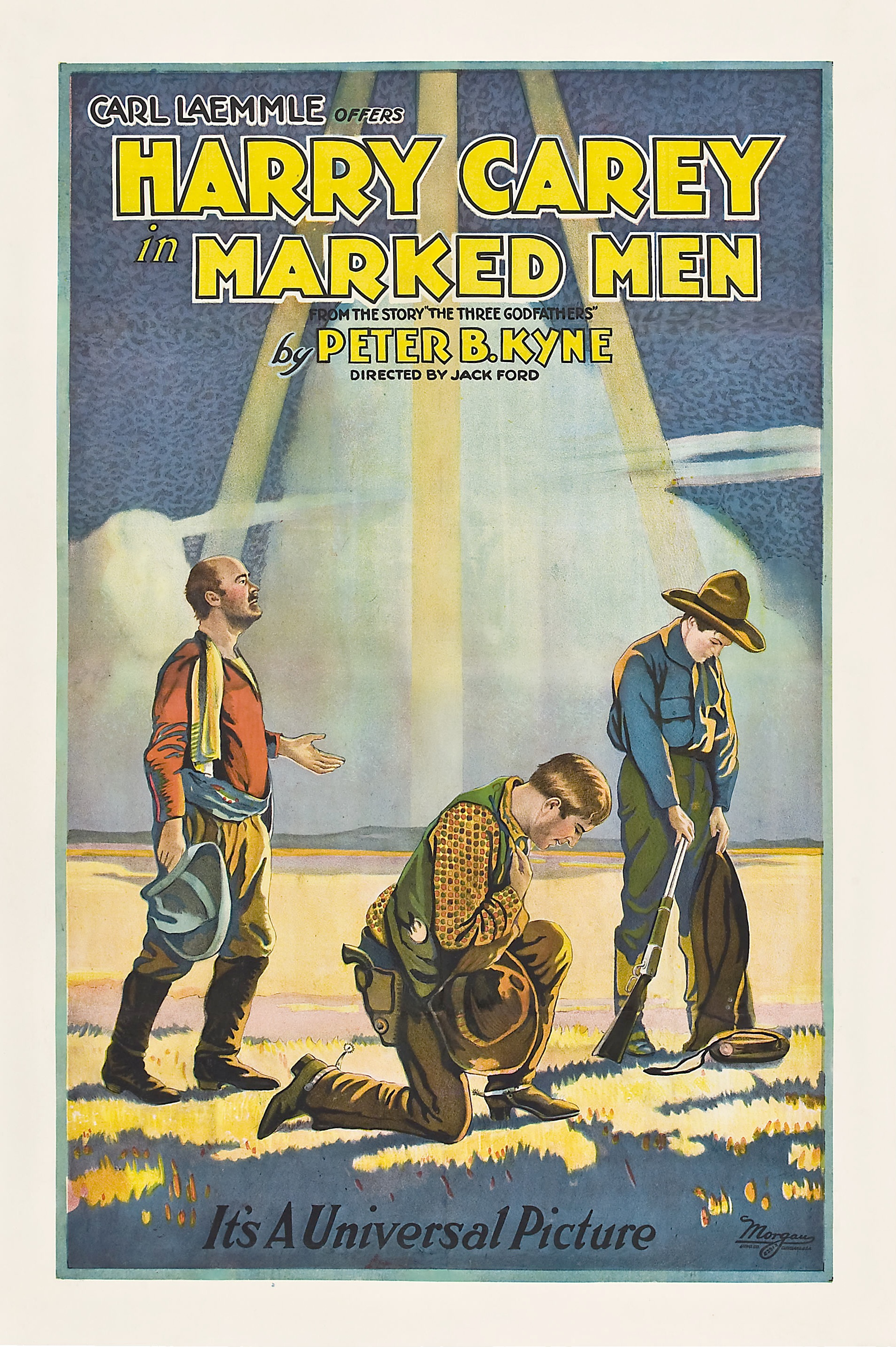
- Theatrical poster
- Directed by: John Ford
- Screenplay by: H. Tipton Steck, Peter B. Kyne
- Based on: The Three Godfathers by Peter B. Kyne
- Produced by: Pat Powers
- Starring: Harry Carey
- Cinematography: John W. Brown
- Edited by: Frank Atkinson; Frank Lawrence
- Production company: Universal Film Manufacturing Company
- Distributed by: Universal Film Manufacturing Company
- Release date: December 21, 1919
- Running time: 50 minutes
- Country: United States
- Languages: Silent; English intertitles

Marked Men is a 1919 American silent Western film directed by John Ford and starring Harry Carey. It is an adaptation of the 1913 short story The Three Godfathers by Peter B. Kyne. Considered to be lost, it is a remake of the 1916 film The Three Godfathers, which also starred Carey.

== Cast ==
- Harry Carey as Harry "Cheyenne Harry" Henderson
- Joe Harris as Tom Gibbons
- Ted Brooks as Tony Garcia
- Charles Le Moyne as Sheriff Pete Cushing
- J. Farrell MacDonald as Tom Placer McGraw
- Winifred Westover as Ruby Merrill
- David Kirby as Warden Bruiser Kelly (uncredited)

== See also ==
- List of lost films
