= Harry Carey Jr. =

American actor (1921–2012)

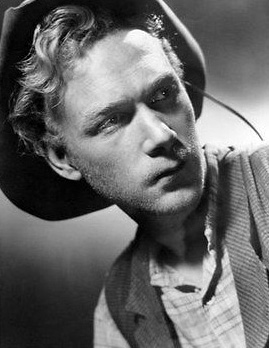
- Carey in 1948
- Born: Henry George Carey Jr. May 16, 1921; Santa Clarita, California
- Died: December 27, 2012 (aged 91); Santa Barbara, California, U.S.
- Occupation: Actor
- Years active: 1946–2010
- Spouse: Marilyn Fix (m. 1944)
- Children: 4
- Parents: Harry Carey (father); Olive Carey (mother)
- Relatives: Paul Fix (father-in-law); George Fuller Golden (grandfather)
- Website: harrycareyjr.com

Signature
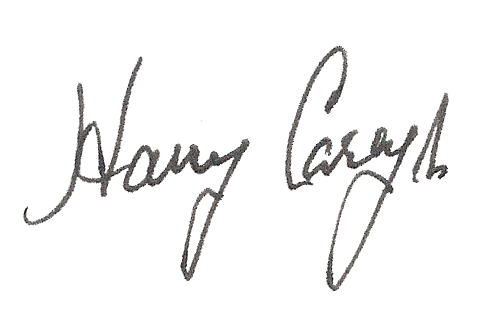

Henry George Carey Jr. (May 16, 1921 – December 27, 2012) was an American actor. He appeared in more than 90 films, including several John Ford Westerns, as well as numerous television series.

== Early life ==
Carey was born on May 16, 1921, on a ranch near the Saugus neighborhood of Santa Clarita, California. He is the son of actor Harry Carey (1878–1947) and actress Olive Carey (1896–1988). As a child he learned to speak Navajo. His maternal grandfather was vaudeville entertainer George Fuller Golden. As a boy he was nicknamed "Dobe", short for adobe, because of the color of his hair. He grew up on his parents' ranch in Santa Clarita; they had horses and cattle. His family ranch was later turned into a historic park by Los Angeles County and was named Tesoro Adobe Park.

== Military service ==
During World War II, Carey Jr. served six years in the United States Navy as a Pharmacist Mate 2nd Class (medical corpsman) in the Pacific War. However, he was transferred back to the United States (against his wishes) to serve with his father's good friend the director John Ford in a Naval photographic unit attached to the Office of Strategic Services (OSS). He then helped to make training films for the navy and the OSS.

== Career ==
After leaving the navy, Carey attempted a singing career to avoid acting but was unsuccessful. He began acting in the John Ford Stock Company with his father. Carey collaborated frequently with director John Ford, who was a close friend. He appeared in such notable Ford films as 3 Godfathers (1948), She Wore a Yellow Ribbon (1949), The Searchers (1956), and Cheyenne Autumn (1964). Both of his parents had appearances in Ford's films as well. He can be seen in a very early episode of The Lone Ranger. He became a respected character actor like his father. Carey appeared in many Westerns. He made four films with director Howard Hawks. The first was Red River, which featured both Carey and his father in separate scenes, followed by Monkey Business, Gentlemen Prefer Blondes, and Rio Bravo. Carey is credited in Rio Bravo, but his scenes were cut. Carey speculated that Hawks either did not like Carey's outfit or cut the scene because Carey addressed Hawks as "Howard" instead of "Mr. Hawks".

Carey also collaborated with John Wayne with whom he made nine films. He got to work with Wayne first in Red River and last in Cahill U.S. Marshal. He also starred in nine films alongside Ben Johnson including Rio Grande and Cherry 2000. Between 1955 and 1957, Carey appeared as ranch counselor Bill Burnett in the serial Spin and Marty, seen on Walt Disney's Mickey Mouse Club. A DVD version of The Adventures of Spin & Marty was released in December 2005 as part of the Walt Disney Treasures series. Carey was interviewed by Leonard Maltin on the 50th anniversary of the series' debut as a DVD bonus feature. In the 1960s, Carey appeared on such western series as Have Gun - Will Travel and The Legend of Jesse James.

On April 29, 1962, Carey was cast as Mitch Evers in the episode "Cort" of the ABC-WB Western series, Lawman, with John Russell and Peter Brown. In the story line, Cort Evers (Kevin Hagen), who is much younger than he appears, seeks revenge against his brother Mitch, whom he mistakenly blames for betraying six Union Army prisoners from their hometown during the American Civil War. Mitch is compelled to confront Cort in a shootout during which he explains that it had been Cort himself, under the influence of a fever, who betrayed the prisoners. Cort faints to the ground as he remembers the startling truth of his brother's words.

1972 saw Carey in a mostly comedic role as the character "Holy Joe" in the Terence Hill Spaghetti Western Man of the East. In 1980, Carey portrayed George Arthur in the movie The Long Riders, a film about the exploits of Jesse James. In 1984, he played Mr. Anderson in Gremlins. In 1985, Carey played the aging biker Red in the movie Mask. He had a brief role in Walter Hill's 1986 film Crossroads and in 1987, Carey was a featured actor in the film The Whales of August, with Bette Davis, Lillian Gish, Vincent Price, and Ann Sothern. In this film Carey portrayed a good-natured and noisy handyman and delivered his lines in a perfect Maine accent. In 1990, Carey appeared in the film Back to the Future Part III in the saloon scene set in 1885. In 1993, he made a cameo in the film Tombstone as Marshal Fred White.

Carey appeared in Tales from the Set, a series of video interviews in which he discussed various individuals with whom he worked. The series debuted in France at the Epona Festival, an event devoted to horses, in October 2007. In 2009, Carey and his partner Clyde Lucas completed Trader Horn: The Journey Back, a remembrance of the 1931 adventure film featuring the elder Carey. Carey attempted to produce a feature film called Comanche Stallion, a project which John Ford had considered making in the early 1960s, based on the 1958 book by Tom Millstead.

== Personal life ==
He married Marilyn Fix, daughter of actor Paul Fix, in 1944. They had four children: Steven, Melinda, Thomas, and Patricia.

Carey wrote an autobiography, Company of Heroes: My Life as an Actor in the John Ford Stock Company, which was published in 1996.

== Death ==
Carey died of natural causes in a hospice on Thursday, December 27, 2012, in Santa Barbara at the age of 91. His ashes are interred at Westwood Village Memorial Park Cemetery. Survivors included his wife, the former actress Marilyn Frances Fix Carey (died 25 April 2017); a son, Thomas; two daughters, Melinda and Patricia; and three grandchildren. He was preceded in death by a son Steven Carey, who died in 1989. At the time of his death, he was reported to be the last living member of the John Ford Stock Company, though in reality John Wayne's son Patrick Wayne survived him.

== Selected filmography ==
=== Film ===
- Desperate Trails (1921) as Young Baby (uncredited)
- Rolling Home (1946) as Dobey
- Pursued (1947) as Prentice
- Red River (1948) as Dan Latimer
- Moonrise (1948) as Jimmy Biff
- Blood on the Moon (1948) as Cowboy (uncredited)
- 3 Godfathers (1948) as William Kearney ("The Albilene Kid")
- She Wore a Yellow Ribbon (1949) as 2nd Lt. Ross Pernell
- Wagon Master (1950) as Sandy Owens
- Copper Canyon (1950) as Lt. Ord
- Rio Grande (1950) as Trooper Daniel 'Sandy' Boone
- Warpath (1951) as Capt. Gregson
- Cattle Drive (1951) as Train Passenger (uncredited)
- The Wild Blue Yonder (1951) as Sgt. Shaker Schuker
- Monkey Business (1952) as Reporter (uncredited)
- Niagara (1953) as Taxi Driver (uncredited)
- San Antone (1953) as Dobe Frakus
- Gentlemen Prefer Blondes (1953) as Winslow - Olympic Team (uncredited)
- Sweethearts on Parade (1953) as Jim Riley, aka James Whitcomb Riley
- Island in the Sky (1953) as Ralph Hunt
- Beneath the 12-Mile Reef (1953) as Griff Rhys
- Silver Lode (1954) as Johnson
- The Outcast (1954) as Bert
- The Long Gray Line (1955) as Dwight Eisenhower
- House of Bamboo (1955) as John (uncredited)
- Mister Roberts (1955) as Stefanowski
- Spin and Marty: The Movie (1955) as Bill Burnett
- The Searchers (1956) as Brad Jorgenson
- The Great Locomotive Chase (1956) as William Bensinger
- Gun the Man Down (1956) as Deputy Lee
- 7th Cavalry (1956) as Cpl. Morrison
- The River's Edge (1957) as Chet
- Kiss Them for Me (1957) as Lt. Chuck Roundtree (uncredited)
- From Hell to Texas (1958) as Trueblood
- Escort West (1958) as Trooper Travis
- Rio Bravo (1959) as Harold (scenes deleted)
- Noose for a Gunman (1960) as Jim Ferguson
- The Great Impostor (1961) as Dr. Joseph Mornay
- Two Rode Together (1961) as Ortho Clegg
- A Public Affair (1962) as Bill Martin
- The Raiders (1963) as Jellicoe
- Cheyenne Autumn (1964) as Trooper Smith (uncredited)
- Taggart (1964) as Lt. Hudson (uncredited)
- Shenandoah (1965) as Jenkins (rebel soldier)
- The Rare Breed (1966) as Mabry
- Billy the Kid Versus Dracula (1966) as Ben Dooley
- Cyborg 2087 (1966) as Jay C
- Alvarez Kelly (1966) as Corporal Peterson
- The Way West (1967) as Mr. McBee
- The Ballad of Josie (1967) as Mooney
- The Devil's Brigade (1968) as Capt Rose
- Bandolero! (1968) as Cort Hayjack
- Death of a Gunfighter (1969) as Rev. Rork
- Ride a Northbound Horse (1969) as Yonder
- The Undefeated (1969) as Solomon Webster
- One More Time (1970) (uncredited)
- The Moonshine War (1970) as Arley Stamper
- Dirty Dingus Magee (1970) as Charles Stuart
- One More Train to Rob (1971) as Red
- Big Jake (1971) as Pop Dawson
- Trinity Is Still My Name (1971) as Father
- Something Big (1971) as Joe Pickins
- Man of the East (1972) as Holy Joe
- Run, Cougar, Run (1972) as Hank
- Cahill U.S. Marshal (1973) as Hank
- Challenge to White Fang (1974) as John Tarwater
- Take a Hard Ride (1975) as Dumper
- Nickelodeon (1976) as Dobie
- The Long Riders (1980) as George Arthur
- Endangered Species (1982) as Dr. Emmer
- The Shadow Riders (1982, TV movie) as Pa Travern
- Gremlins (1984) as Mr. Anderson
- Mask (1985) as Red
- UFOria (1985) as George Martin
- Crossroads (1986) as Bartender
- The Whales of August (1987) as Joshua Brackett
- Once Upon a Texas Train (1988, TV movie) as Herald Finch
- Cherry 2000 (1988) as Snappy Tom
- Illegally Yours (1988) as Wally Finnegan
- Breaking In (1989) as Shoes, Poker Player
- Bad Jim (1990) as J.C. Lee
- Back to the Future, Part III (1990) as Zeke, Saloon Old-Timer #2
- The Exorcist III (1990) as Father Kanavan
- Tombstone (1993) as Marshal Fred White
- Wyatt Earp: Return to Tombstone (1994) as Digger Phelps
- The Sunchaser (1996) as Cashier
- Last Stand at Saber River (1997, TV movie) as James Sanford

=== Television ===
- The Lone Ranger - "Return of Dice Dawn" - Dice Dawson, Alias, Jay Thomasson (1955)
- Have Gun - Will Travel - "The Road to Wickenburg" - Sheriff Jack (1958) Goodfellow
- Have Gun - Will Travel - "The Man Who Wouldn't Talk" - Bud Sorenson (1958)
- The Grey Ghost - "The Picnic" - Caldwell (1958)
- Mackenzie's Raiders - "Uprising" - Ed Gary (1959)
- Gunsmoke - "Horse Deal" - Deesha (1959)
- Have Gun - Will Travel - "The Posse" - Sheriff (1959)
- Bonanza - "Vendetta" - Zack Morgan (1959)
- Wagon Train - "Chuck Wooster, Wagon Master" - Willkins (1959)
- Rawhide - "Incident of the Shambling Man" - Tanner (1959)
- The Rifleman - "The Deserter" - Lt. Paul Rolfe (1960)
- Bonanza - "The Mission" - Corporal Burton (1960)
- Have Gun - Will Travel - "The Sanctuary" - Jonas Quincy (1960)
- Have Gun - Will Travel - "The Legacy" - Banker Burton (1960)
- Have Gun - Will Travel - "The Marshal's Boy" - Frank Gulley (1960)
- Have Gun - Will Travel - "The Misguided Father" - Sheriff Stander (1960)
- Gunsmoke - "Bad Sheriff" - Bill Turloe (1960) - Uncredited
- The Rifleman - "The Journey Back" - Lt. Vaughn (1961)
- Laramie - "The Debt" - Harry Markle (1961)
- Lassie - "The Winner" - Official (1961)
- Whispering Smith - "Safety Valve" - Sgt. Curt Stringer (1961)
- Have Gun - Will Travel - "The Revenger" - Sheriff Conlon (1961)
- Have Gun - Will Travel - "The Tax Gatherer" - Jess Turner (1961)
- Perry Mason - "The Case of the Roving River" - District Ranger Frank Deane (1961)
- Wagon Train - "The George B. Hanrahhan Story" - Tim Hogan (1962)
- Laramie - "Time of the Traitor" - Hobey (1962)
- Gunsmoke - "Abe Blocker" - Jake (1962)
- Laramie - "Lost Allegiance" - Whitey Banister (1962)
- Checkmate - "The Bold and the Tough" - Phil Cassidy (1962)
- Lawman - episode - Cort - Mitch Evers (1962)
- Have Gun - Will Travel - "Jonah and the Trout" - Jonah Quincy (1962)
- Laramie - "The Barefoot Kid" - Dan Emery (1962)
- Gunsmoke - "Quint Asper Comes Home" - Grant (1962)
- Alcoa Premiere - "Flashing Spikes" - Man in the Dugout (1962)
- Have Gun - Will Travel - "Taylor's Woman" - Thad Taylor (1962)
- Rawhide - "The Deserters' Patrol" - Walsh (1962)
- Laramie - "Time of the Traitor" - Hobey (1962)
- Ripcord - Carl Devlin - Para Nurse (1962)
- Ripcord - Cheyenne Bronson - A Free Falling Star (1963)
- Have Gun - Will Travel - "Face of a Shadow" - Earl Tibner (1963)
- Wagon Train - "The Martin Gatsby Story" - Jeb Colton (1963)
- Have Gun - Will Travel "Sweet Lady of the Moon" - Ben Murdock (1963)
- Gunsmoke -" The Quest for Asa Janin" - Sheriff Hank Colridge (1963)
- Wagon Train - "The Molly Kincaid Story" - Charlie Hankins (1963)
- Wagon Train - "The Sam Pulaski Story" - John Jay Burroughs (1963)
- Bonanza - "The Flannel-Mouth Gun" - Phil Shelton (1965)
- Wagon Train - "The Silver Lady" - Walt Thompson (1965)
- Gunsmoke - "Bank Baby" - Jim Fisher (1965)
- Branded - "Leap Upon Mountains" - Lt. John Pritchett (uncredited) (1965)
- Branded - "The Vindicators" - Lt. John Pritchett (1965)
- The Virginian - "The Modoc Kid" - Bob Archer (1967)
- Gunsmoke - "Baker's Dozen" - Will Roniger (1967)
- Bonanza - "Judgement at Red Creek" - Mapes (1967)
- Gunsmoke - "Waco" - Nathan Cade (1968)
- Mannix - "Missing: Sun and Sky" - Floyd Brand (1969)
- The Virginian - "Follow the Leader" - Thad Miley (1970)
- Gunsmoke - "Gold Train: The Bullet" parts 1-3 - Kelliher (1971)
- Banacek - "Horse of a Slightly Different Color" - Dean Barrett (1974)
- Hec Ramsey - "Scar Tissue - Prospector" (1974)
- Gunsmoke - "Trail of Bloodshed" - Amos Brody (1974)
- Police Woman - "Sons" (1978)
- B.J. and the Bear - "Fire in the Hole" - Joe Pogovich (1980)
- Little House on the Prairie - "A New Beginning" - Sheriff Pike (1980)
- Dallas - "End of the Road: Part 1" - Red (1981)
- Knight Rider - "Not a Drop to Drink" - Josh Morgan (1982)
- CHiPs - "Flare Up" - Grandfather Cross (1982)
- Hollywood Greats - TV series documentary - "John Wayne" - himself (1984)
- Biography - TV series documentary - "John Wayne: The Unquiet American" - himself (1987)
- Cowboys: Ben Johnson & Harry Carey Jr. - documentary (1988)
- John Wayne Standing Tall - TV movie - himself (1989)
- B.L. Stryker - "Auntie Sue" - Jim Bob Jones (1989)
- Thank Ya, Thank Ya Kindly - TV movie documentary - himself (1991)
- Omnibus - TV Series documentary - "John Ford: Part One" - himself (1992)
- Legends of the American West - video documentary - himself (1992)
- John Ford - TV movie documentary - himself (1993)
- Ben Johnson: Third Cowboy on the Right - documentary - himself (1996)
- Howard Hawks: American Artist - TV movie documentary - himself (1997)
- G.I. Joe: The Ernie Pyle Story - TV movie documentary (1998)
- American Masters - TV series documentary - "John Ford/John Wayne: The Filmmaker and the Legend" - himself (2006)
- Harry Carey Jr Hosts John Wayne Meets Lucy - video documentary short -himself (host) (2009)
- Harry Carey Jr's Tribute to John Wayne Producer - video short - himself (2010)

== Awards ==
For his contribution to the television industry, Carey was given a star on the Hollywood Walk of Fame at 6363 Vine Street. In 1987, Carey received the Golden Boot award from the Motion Pictures & Television Fund Foundation. In 2003, he was inducted into the Western Performers Hall of Fame at the National Cowboy & Western Heritage Museum in Oklahoma City. That same year he also received the Silver Spur award that was given to him by Reel Cowboys.
