= Two Flags West =

1950 film by Robert Wise

- Theatrical release poster
- Directed by: Robert Wise
- Screenplay by: Casey Robinson
- Story by: Frank S. Nugent; Curtis Kenyon
- Produced by: Casey Robinson
- Starring: Joseph Cotten; Linda Darnell; Jeff Chandler; Cornel Wilde
- Cinematography: Leon Shamroy
- Edited by: Louis Loeffler
- Music by: Hugo Friedhofer
- Color process: Black and white
- Production company: Twentieth Century-Fox
- Distributed by: Twentieth Century-Fox
- Release date: October 11, 1950 (Atlanta)
- Running time: 92 minutes
- Country: United States
- Language: English

Two Flags West is a 1950 Western drama set during the American Civil War, directed by Robert Wise and starring Joseph Cotten, Jeff Chandler, Linda Darnell and Cornel Wilde. Based on the historical service of "Galvanized Yankees", the film tells the story of a company of imprisoned Confederate States Army cavalry troopers who are granted amnesty and travel to a remote New Mexico post that is attacked by Kiowa Indians.

Two Flags West is among a group of 1950s Civil War reconciliation-themed Westerns in which soldiers from North and South combine against a common foe, along with Rocky Mountain (1950), The Last Outpost (1951), Escape from Fort Bravo (1953) and Revolt at Fort Laramie (1957).

== Plot ==
In the autumn of 1864, remnants of the Confederate 5th Georgia Cavalry are prisoners of war in the Union prison camp at Rock Island, Illinois. Sick and dying in deplorable conditions, they find a chance for survival when Union captain Mark Bradford offers them release if they will join the Union Army to garrison a fort on the Western frontier. The fort is undermanned and vulnerable to Indian attack. Although promised that they will not be compelled to fight against their own men, many of the Georgians resist the offer. The men vote to decide on the proposition, but when the last soldier dies before he can choose, the result is a deadlock. Compassion for his men, and Bradford's sincerity, compel their reluctant commander, Col. Clay Tucker, to break the tie by agreeing to the conditions.

The troop arrives at Fort Thorn, New Mexico, a small outpost of the 3rd Cavalry, commanded by the stern and bitter Major Henry Kenniston, who walks with a limp from a wound that relegated him to the fort early in the war. Tucker, now a lieutenant in the Union Army, dines with Kenniston, his widowed sister-in-law Elena and civilian guests, but he is irritated by their patronizing comments. The tension increases when Tucker reveals that he led the cavalry charge that killed Elena's husband. She has been stranded for months at the fort on her way home and is uneasy about her brother-in-law's protectiveness, suspecting that he believes himself to be his late brother's surrogate.

Friction quickly develops between the Northern and Southern soldiers. When Tucker's men try to pursue a band of Indians but are ordered to stop, they mock the order as Yankee irresoluteness. Kenniston rebukes them, warning them they had been riding into an ambush. He assigns the Georgians to execute two civilians convicted of gunrunning. When informed that they were actually Confederate agents, Tucker objects, arguing that it is a violation of their enlistment agreement. He begins plotting to desert the command, but Kenniston shrewdly deduces his plan. Rationalizing that he does not want enemies in his ranks, Kenniston assigns Tucker's troop to escort a wagon train across hostile territory, knowing that Tucker will deliver it safely before deserting. Elena escapes by concealing herself in a wagon, which Tucker discovers but allows to continue. Ephraim Strong, a civilian in the train, reveals himself as a Confederate agent who is pretending to be on the Union side and enlists Tucker in a plan to link California with the South. He persuades Tucker not to desert with his men but to return to Fort Thorn with Elena to gain Kenniston's confidence. While surprised by Tucker's actions, Kenniston continues to be wary of him.

The troop is away from the fort when Kenniston executes a Kiowa warrior, son of the chief Satank, as a "rebel and traitor". Tucker receives his orders to join the Confederates and makes Bradford a prisoner. He orders him to be brought to the fort, but Bradford and his escort return to report that the fort is under siege by hundreds of Kiowa warriors. Despite strong misgivings, Tucker returns. The troop fights its way into the fort but can only delay the inevitable and are saved from annihilation only by the setting of the sun. Bradford is killed, and Kenniston offers himself as a sacrifice and relinquishes command to Tucker.

A few days later, a dispatch rider arrives with news that General Sherman has completed his march to the sea, spelling doom for the Confederacy. Elena tries to comfort a despairing Tucker with the hope that things will seem better tomorrow.

== Cast ==
- Joseph Cotten as Lt. Clay Tucker
- Linda Darnell as Elena Kenniston
- Jeff Chandler as Maj. Henry Kenniston
- Cornel Wilde as Capt. Mark Bradford
- Dale Robertson as Lem
- Jay C. Flippen as Sgt, Major Duffy
- Noah Beery Jr. as Corp. Cy Davis (as Noah Beery)
- Harry von Zell as Ephraim Strong
- Johnny Sands as Lt. Adams (as John Sands)
- Arthur Hunnicutt as 1st Sgt. Pickens

== Production ==
The film's working title was Trumpet to the Morn.

Fox had originally intended the role of Col. Clay Tucker to be played by either Victor Mature or Richard Basehart, but Joseph Cotten was cast at the last minute, loaned to Fox by Selznick International Pictures. The role of the major was meant to be played by Lee J. Cobb, who owed Twentieth Century-Fox a film after recently ending a long-term contract with the studio after refusing to appear in Where the Sidewalk Ends. However, Cobb was replaced by Jeff Chandler, who had signed a six-film contract with the studio after starring in Broken Arrow. Chandler commuted from Hollywood to the filming location because of his radio commitments.

The film was shot on location at San Ildefonso Pueblo, New Mexico, using buildings of the Pueblo Indians for those of Fort Thorn, and on the nearby Shipman Ranch near Black Mesa, which is seen prominently in the film. The local Tewa Indians agreed to use of their community, with buildings as old as 400 years, when director Robert Wise promised that filming would remain clear of the tribal kiva (underground council room), cemetery and sacred shrines.

Screenwriter Frank S. Nugent developed the concept for the film while writing the screenplay for She Wore a Yellow Ribbon in 1948. During research Nugent consulted historians Dee Brown and Martin F. Schmitt, authors of Fighting Indians of the West, for sources of information about the use of "Galvanized Yankees", and learned that Confederate plans to connect El Paso, Texas, with California were formulated in late 1864. He submitted his story, The Yankee From Georgia, to Metro-Goldwyn-Mayer but did not receive an offer. The project for Twentieth Century-Fox began with the working title of Trumpet to the Morn. The circumstances of the recruiting and delivery of Tucker's men are similar to those experienced by Union Capt. Henry Palmer and Company K of the 11th Ohio Cavalry from Camp Chase, Ohio to Fort Kearney, Nebraska, and then on to Fort Laramie, Wyoming in 1864. They were also the only former Confederate cavalrymen (originally part of Morgan's Raiders) to see service as "Galvanized Yankees" on the Western frontier.

== Release ==
The film's world premiere was held at the Fox Theatre in Atlanta on October 11, 1950 following a parade down Peachtree Street. A contingent of Hollywood stars including Richard Widmark, Richard Conte, Roddy McDowall, Hugh Marlowe and Marion Marshall performed on stage before the film, and Lois Andrews served as the master of ceremonies. The audience of approximately 5,000 attendees afforded a standing ovation to 105-year-old General William J. Bush, Georgia's last surviving Confederate soldier, who cried the rebel yell from the stage.

== Reception ==
In a contemporary review for The New York Times, critic Bosley Crowther wrote: "All of the popular elements of a good, rousing cavalry film, plus something a little better than usual in the way of a story line, have been handsomely put together by Twentieth Century-Fox in 'Two Flags West' ... And the consequence is a gallant picture which may not have the brilliance or the dash of one supervised by veteran John Ford but will fully pass muster, nonetheless."

Critic Philip K. Scheuer of the Los Angeles Times wrote: "As the basis for an off-beat plot, this is not unlike the one employed recently in the Errol Flynn picture, 'Rocky Mountain.' There is another strong point of resemblance: in both films, it is a dream of the Confederates to wrest California, in a surprise insurrection aided by them, from the United States. One more time, and you all will begin to believe that we all nearly had Jeff Davis as President. This abortive or incipient campaign has its origin in fact, and I found it easier to accept as such than I did the behavior of the players who were involved in it, or the rather high-flown language they were required to use. As in 'Rocky Mountain,' the men's relationships are complicated by the presence of a woman; and while I don't say she mightn't have been around even at the actual Ft. Thorn, there is no doubt that she makes the boys self-conscious and acts as a drag on the story line."
