= Wagon Master =

1950 film by John Ford

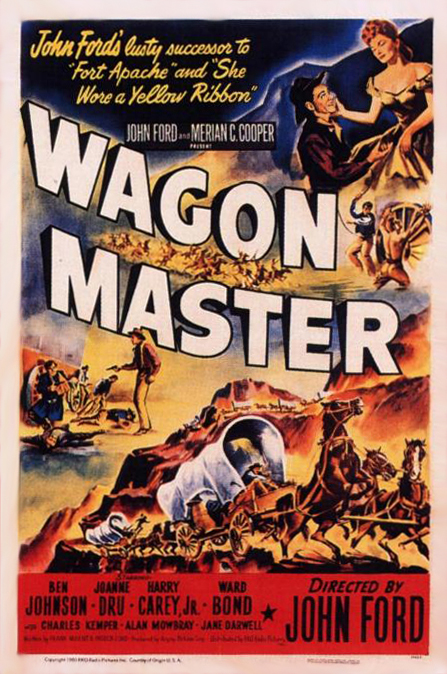
- 1950 theatrical release poster
- Directed by: John Ford
- Written by: Patrick Ford; Frank S. Nugent
- Produced by: John Ford; Merian C. Cooper
- Starring: Ben Johnson; Joanne Dru; Harry Carey Jr.; Ward Bond
- Cinematography: Bert Glennon (director of photography)
- Edited by: Jack Murray
- Music by: Richard Hageman
- Production company: Argosy Pictures
- Distributed by: RKO-Radio Pictures Inc.
- Release date: April 22, 1950 (US)
- Running time: 86 min.
- Country: United States
- Languages: English; Navajo; Spanish

Wagon Master is a 1950 American Western film produced and directed by John Ford and starring Ben Johnson, Harry Carey Jr., Joanne Dru, and Ward Bond. The story follows a Mormon pioneer wagon train across treacherous desert to the San Juan River in Utah. The film inspired the American television series Wagon Train (1957–1965), which starred Bond until his death in 1960. The film was a personal favorite of Ford himself, who told Peter Bogdanovich in 1967 that "Along with The Fugitive and The Sun Shines Bright, Wagon Master came closest to being what I wanted to achieve." While the critical and audience response to Wagon Master was lukewarm on its release, over the years numerous critics have come to view it as one of Ford's masterpieces.

== Plot ==
The Clegg gang stages a brazen hold-up of a store, which turns murderous before they can escape. Already wanted, the motley band is led by patriarch Shiloh, who bullies his four feral adult sons and nephew.

Travis Blue and Sandy Owens are a young but seasoned pair of roving horse traders. They bring their haul back from Navajo country to Crystal City, anxious to deal and gamble. A Mormon wagon train led by the Elder Wiggs needs stock and pays exorbitantly for the entire string. The pioneers also need guides to lead them across the unknown to the San Juan River country in southeastern Utah Territory. They're driven with Mormon determination to reach their "promised land" and get a crop in before the winter rains so that a harvest will provide for a much larger migration which will blindly follow the next Spring. The boys politely turn them down.

Having overstayed Crystal City's welcome, the Mormons are sent packing by a delegation of rifle-toting townsmen. Watching the train head for the horizon the boys, already bored after just a day in town, catch a pretty redhead's glance, have money but nothing to spend it on, and an irrepressible yen for adventure. They chase down Elder Wiggs and sign on, with Travis as wagon master and Sandy as his ramrod.

Shortly they encounter a stranded medicine show, complete with "coochie dancers" and top-hatted elixir-drummer, "Doctor" A. Locksley Hall, who are temporarily adopted to save them from perishing. The boys both have eyes for beautiful but slightly soiled dove "Denver".

The going is challenging but good progress is made each day. In spite of the divergent mix of pious, restrained Mormons, happy-go-lucky cowboys, and colorful entertainers, everyone settles in and grows comfortable with one-another. Celebrating reaching an important source of water in the desert they break out their fiddles and let loose in an evening of spirited squaredancing - interrupted ominously by the arrival of the Cleggs, who are starving, thirsty, and threatening behind a thin veneer of politeness put on by Shiloh; even browbeating his boys leaves him hard-pressed to keep them short-leashed around women and the Doctor's considerable supply of alcohol.

Shiloh is in desperate need of medical attention for a festering gunshot wound he received in the robbery, passing it off as an injury sustained falling off his horse. The Doctor is pressed into reluctant service, and an uneasy détente with the Cleggs as excess baggage ensues.

The wagon train encounters a band of seemingly hostile Navajos, who drop their enmity upon discovering the band is Mormon, and invite them to a ceremonial dance at their camp. All goes well until one of the Cleggs boys rapes an Indian woman and Wiggs is forced to have him horsewhipped in front of everyone to placate their hosts. This saves everyone's lives, but fuels dangerous resentment in Shiloh, who plans his own revenge in kind.

With each upheaval Sandy goads Travis over the two of them "making a play" to throw the Cleggs over, restore order, and banish them to their fate. Travis is not cowardly, just circumspect, explaining to Sandy that if they two of them get killed everybody will die helplessly in the wilderness...as will the large throng that is expecting a settlement when they arrive at the San Juan, and that precious crop they'll starve without. Neither friend has ever "drawn on a man", Travis attesting he only ever shoots snakes.

The crux of the trail is reached, and the Cleggs spring on both Wiggs and Jackson, the man who had done the whipping. They brutally shoot the latter first, but before they can drive Wiggs to his death over a cliff the boys make their play, Sandy shooting first and Travis backing him up. In a hail of bullets the entire Clegg clan is slain, without drawing blood of the survivors.

Finally, galvanized as one, the band reaches easier going... and the boys are rewarded for their daring, trading in their horses for reins, Sandy unable to restrain a playful kiss on the prim redhead next to him, and Travis smiling next to a glowing Denver, who finally has dropped her guard, and fear of not deserving such a wholesome, handsome, respectful man.

As the wagons clatter contentedly Providence smiles on the faithful, and their shepherds. The seed corn will go in before the winter rains.

== Cast ==
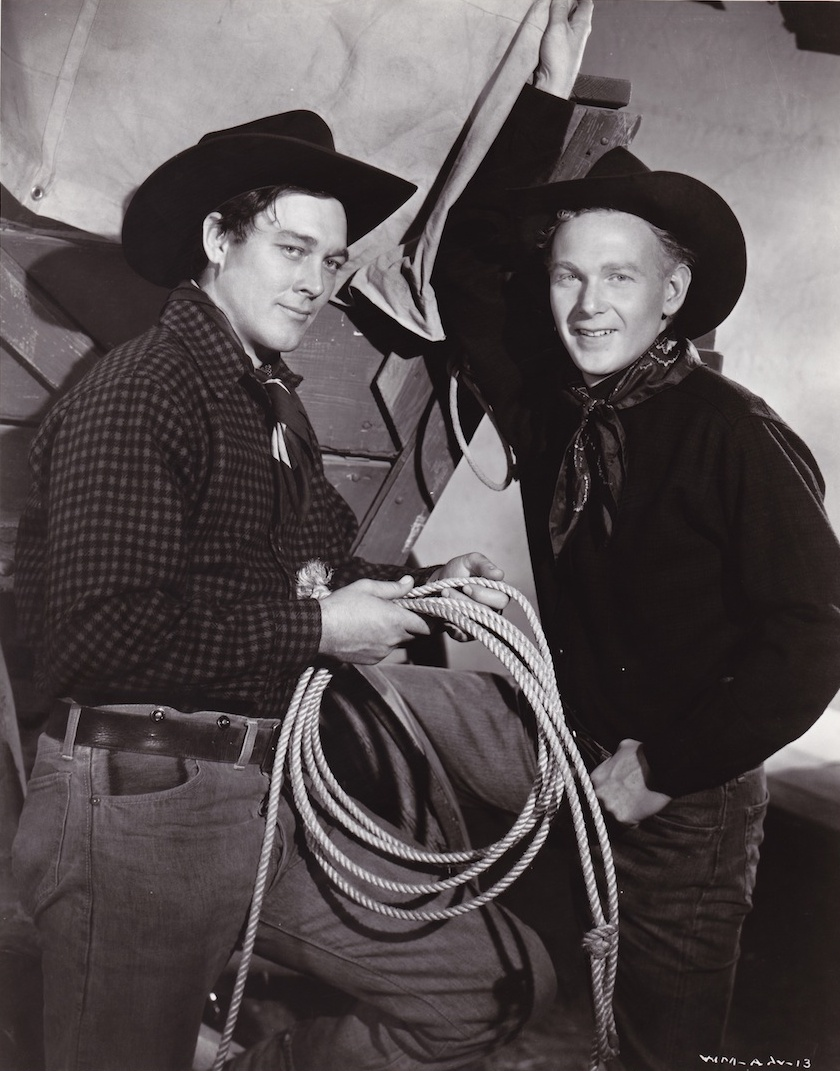
Publicity photograph showing Ben Johnson with Harry Carey Jr.

- Ben Johnson as Travis Blue
- Harry Carey Jr. as Sandy Owens
- Joanne Dru as Denver
- Ward Bond as Elder Wiggs
- Charles Kemper as Uncle Shiloh Clegg
- Alan Mowbray as Dr. A. Locksley Hall
- Jane Darwell as Sister Ledyard
- Hank Worden as Luke Clegg
- Movita Castaneda as Young Navajo Indian
- Ruth Clifford as Fleuretty Phyffe
- Russell Simpson as Adam Perkins
- Kathleen O'Malley as Prudence Perkins
- Mickey Simpson as Jesse Clegg
- Cliff Lyons as Marshal of Crystal City
- Chuck Hayward as Jackson (uncredited)
- James Arness as Floyd Clegg
- Jim Thorpe as a Navajo indian

== Production ==
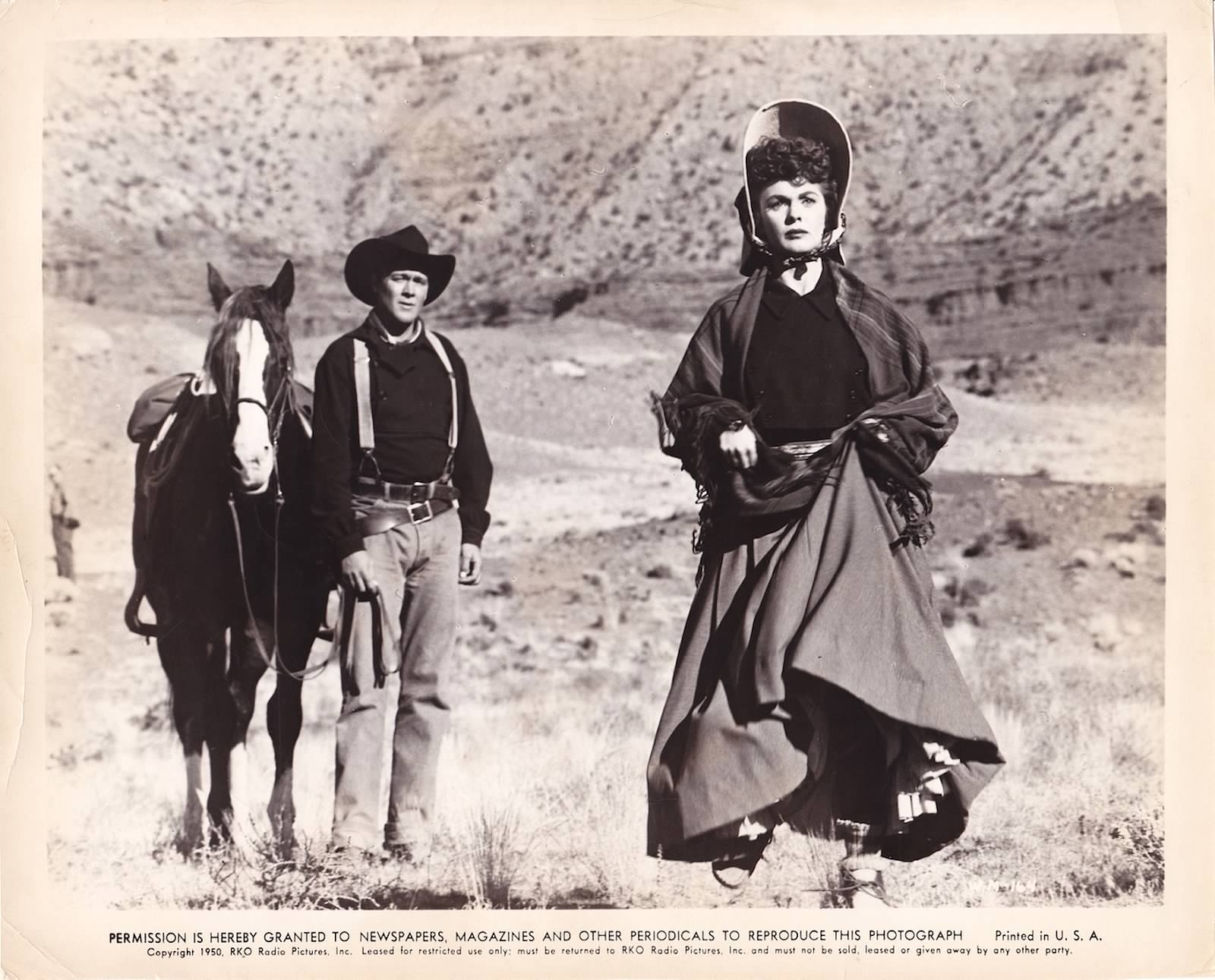
Publicity poster for the film showing Ben Johnson (left, as Travis) watching Joanne Dru (right, as Denver) as she runs away from his marriage proposal.

Wagon Master was produced by Argosy Pictures, which was the independent production company formed by Ford and Merian C. Cooper mostly to give Ford a control over his films that was impossible for films produced by the major film studios. Ford and Cooper were credited as co-executive producers, with Lowell J. Farrell as associate producer. Between 1946 and 1953, Ford and Cooper produced eight films through Argosy Pictures, of which Wagon Master was the fifth.

The story idea for Wagon Master emerged while Ford was directing She Wore a Yellow Ribbon (1949) on location in southern Utah. Patrick Ford, a screenwriter and Ford's son, learned the history of the Mormon Hole in the Rock expedition (1879–1880) from some local Mormon horsemen. Ford developed a story loosely based on the historical expedition. It was unusual for Ford to base his films on the stories he wrote, and it had been nearly 20 years since he'd last done so (Men Without Women (1930)). Ford commissioned Patrick Ford and Frank S. Nugent to write the screenplay. As was typical for Ford, he changed the screenplay significantly while directing the film; he was quoted as telling Patrick Ford and Nugent that, "I liked your script, boys. In fact, I actually shot a few pages of it."

Ford had been shooting the film She Wore a Yellow Ribbon the year before (1948) in Monument Valley, near the town of Mexican Hat, Utah, close to the locations where he had also filmed Stagecoach (1939), My Darling Clementine (1946), and Fort Apache (1948). He wanted a different look for his next film and drove to Moab, Utah. Filmed in black and white on location, mainly north-east of the town in Professor Valley (with additional shooting at Spanish Valley south-west of Moab, and a few stage shots at Monument Valley).

Ford selected Bert Glennon as the director of photography. He'd worked with Glennon on five films between 1935 and 1939, including Stagecoach, for which both Ford and Glennon were nominated for Academy Awards. Ford chose to film Wagon Master in black and white; in 2009, Glenn Kenny wrote that the film "... reveals Bert Glennon's cinematography for the miracle that it was/is. Watching the disc this evening I wondered if it was not, in fact, frame-by-frame one of the most gorgeous motion pictures ever shot."

Location filming was done in less than a month. Wagon Master was edited by Jack Murray, who had edited six of Ford's previous films, including all of the Argosy Pictures productions.

=== Music ===
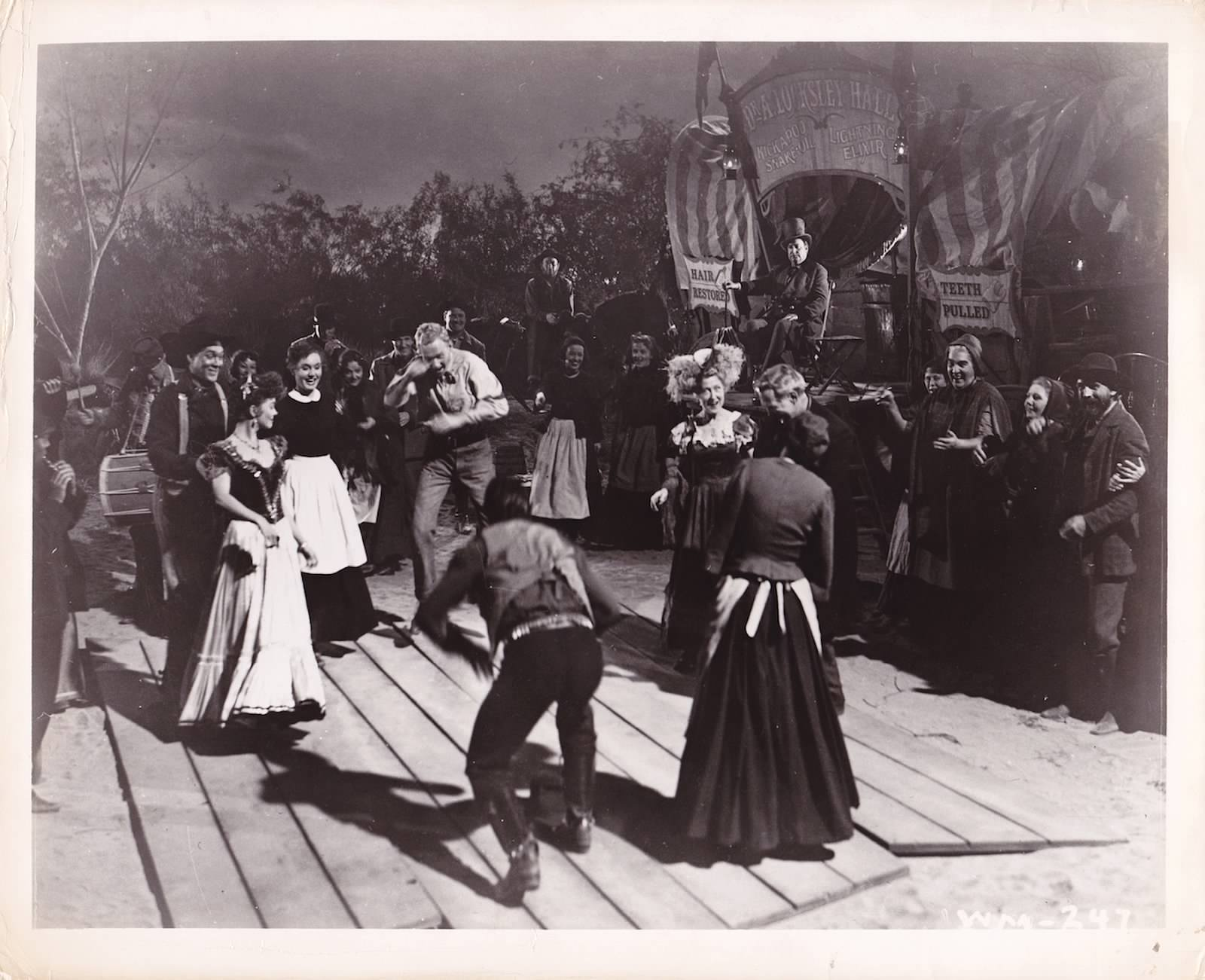
Publicity photograph of the Mormon square dance held to celebrate safe passage through the desert. Actors play instruments, but the sound track is overdubbed by The Sons of the Pioneers.

The film's score was composed by Richard Hageman, a noted conductor and composer of art songs and other musical works. Commencing with Stagecoach (1939), Hageman wrote music for seven films directed by John Ford; Wagon Master was the last. Kathryn Kalinak has written that Ford "got great work out of the people he worked with, and often those he was hardest on produced the best work of their careers. One of those was Richard Hageman, the Philadelphia Orchestra notwithstanding."

Songs are important in Wagon Master. Critic Dennis Lim has written, "Practically a musical, Wagon Master is filled with frequent song and dance interludes and accompanied by a steady stream of hymns and ballads, performed by the popular country group the Sons of the Pioneers." Filmgoers learn of Travis Blue's and Sandy Owens' decision to accept the wagon master job when Travis and Sandy break into song. Stan Jones wrote four original songs that were performed by the Sons of the Pioneers for the film's soundtrack. At its conclusion, the film incorporates a "spirited" rendition of the Mormon hymn, "Come, Come, Ye Saints". John Ford had insisted that Harry Carey Jr. lead the company of the film, which included many Mormons, in singing the hymn; the version used for the film's soundtrack was apparently recorded by the Robert Mitchell Boys Choir.

== Release ==
The film was apparently not widely reviewed upon its 1950 release. Variety noted that "Wagon Master is a good outdoor action film, done in the best John Ford manner. That means careful character development and movement, spiced with high spots of action, good drama and leavening comedy moments."

The picture was distributed by RKO Pictures. The film recorded a loss of $65,000 and was the last co-production between Argosy and RKO.

== Critical response ==
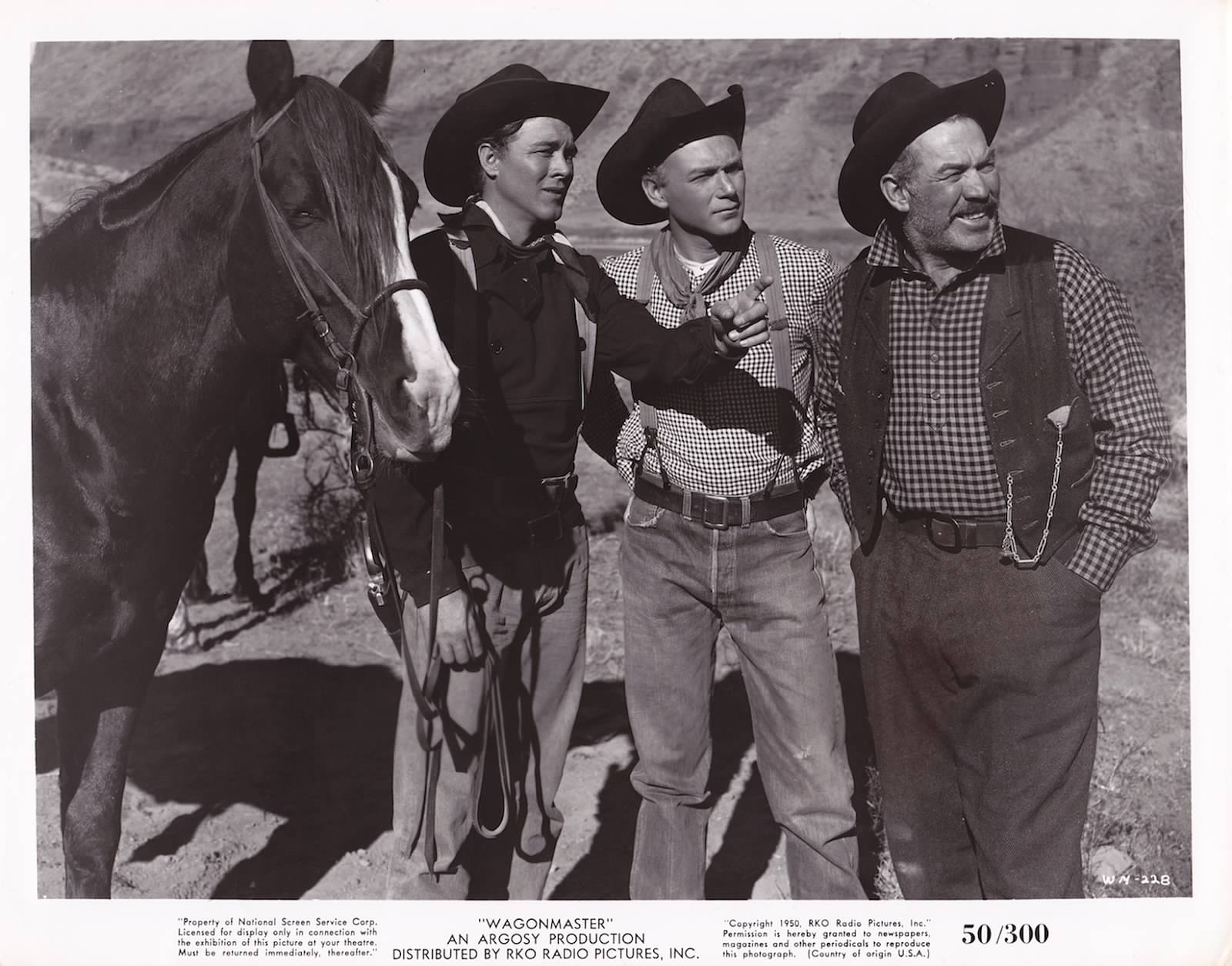
Ben Johnson, Harry Carey, Jr. and Ward Bond

Film critic Tag Gallagher wrote at length about Wagon Master in his 1986 book, John Ford: the man and his films. His summary is, "That Wagon Master (1950), one of Ford's major masterpieces, grossed about a third of any of the cavalry pictures surely came as no surprise. It was a personal project, with no stars, little story, deflated drama, almost nothing to attract box office or trendy critics. Its budget was $999,370, its highest paid actor got $20,000 (Ward Bond). Almost every frame bursts with humanity, nature and cinema, quite like Rossellini's Voyage in Italy. The story, resembling the Carey-Fords of the teens more than a 1950s western, was written by Ford himself, the only such instance after 1930."

There have been a number of reviews of Wagon Master since its 2009 DVD release. Most contemporary critics appear to concur with Gallagher's view that Wagon Master is a major masterpiece.

David Kehr wrote in 1985, "Ford treats one of his central themes—the birth of a community—through a sweeping visual metaphor of movement. Seldom has the western landscape seemed such a tangible emblem of hope and freedom. A masterpiece beyond question — but a masterpiece that never degenerates into pomposity or self-consciousness. It's American filmmaking at its finest and most eloquent."

Dennis Lim wrote in 2009, "Wagon Master is at once the plainest and the fullest expression of Ford's great theme: the emergence of a community. So committed is the film to the idea of a collective hero that there is no one central character, no leading man or marquee name. Instead of Wayne or Henry Fonda, "Wagon Master" is filled with lesser-known but familiar faces from the Ford stock company. And while some of the usual elements of the genre are accounted for, down to a climactic gunfight, there is not much of a plot."

Richard Jameson wrote in 2009, "Might Wagon Master be John Ford's greatest film? With so many worthy candidates, we needn't insist. But it's the purest. No one else could or would have made it. There's not a second, not a frame, that answers to any convention, any imperative beyond the director's wish that it be as it is, look at what it looks at the way it does."

Jeremy Arnold wrote at Turner Classic Movies, "And yet Wagon Master is one of the most poetic narrative films ever made. What little plot exists is secondary to the movie's real concern: celebrating a way of life, that of Mormon pioneers, and placing it in the context of nature. Director John Ford, one of the most visual of directors working near the peak of his career, called Wagon Master not only his favorite Western but described it as, 'along with The Fugitive (1947) and The Sun Shines Bright (1953), the closest to being what I had wanted to achieve.'"

Linda Rasmussen wrote, "This wonderful film emphasizes the virtues of solidarity, sacrifice and tolerance, and shows John Ford at his most masterful, in total control of the production from the casting to the bit players to the grandeur and scope of the visual compositions. The film, with its breathtaking scenery, brilliant performances by a cast of character actors, and an engaging sense of humor, is a superlative example of the American western."

David Fear wrote in 2009, "For a modest little movie, this still has all the solid storytelling and visual majesty of Ford's classic works; scholars like Joseph McBride and Peter Bogdanovich actually think it's his masterpiece."

While respectful of the film's accomplishments, other critics are more muted. In George N. Fenin and William K. Everson's 1973 overview, The Western: from silents to the seventies, they wrote that "Wagon Master is as close to a genuine Western film-poem as we have ever come, but attempts by Ford's admirers to enlarge it beyond that do both it and Ford a disservice."

== Home media ==
A region 1 DVD was released by Warner Home Video in 2009. Critic Glenn Kenny wrote of this release, "the main attraction is the film itself, buffed to a lustrous (but still grain-rich) sheen that reveals Bert Glennon's cinematography for the miracle that it was/is. Watching the disc this evening I wondered if it was not, in fact, frame-by-frame one of the most gorgeous motion pictures ever shot." A region 2 DVD was released in Europe in 2002; it has a French language soundtrack as well as the English one. There was a release to videotape (VHS) in 1990. A colorized version was also released as a VHS tape.

In 1998, the copyrights to both the original and colored versions of the film were donated to The Library of Congress, along with an original master reel copy of the film. The reel is stored in an individual secure vault at the Packard Campus in Culpeper, Virginia in order to preserve the film for future generations.
