= Andre Sennwald =

American film critic (1907–1936)

- Born: August 4, 1907
- Died: January 12, 1936 (aged 28); New York, New York
- Education: Columbia University School of Journalism

Andre David Sennwald (August 4, 1907 – January 12, 1936) was a motion picture critic for The New York Times.

== Life ==
After graduating from Columbia University School of Journalism, Sennwald was hired as a reporter for The New York Times in 1930. As the film critic Mordaunt Hall gave up his post in October 1934, Sennwald became his successor.

He lived at 670 West End Avenue, Upper West Side. He was married to the former Yvonne Beaudry.

He died on January 12, 1936, as a result of gas poisoning before his penthouse apartment exploded because of a gas leak. The explosion wrecked the penthouse and the top three floors of the 17-story building. Sennwald had an appointment with his ex-wife Yvonne Beaudray and did not appear, which is why she went to see him, only to find him dead in the ruins of his home. Since Sennwald was believed by friends to be in good health and no suicide note was found, nor was one ever officially released, whether it was an accident or a suicide is unknown.

His last review was for The Ghost Goes West.

His successor as chief film critic of the New York Times was Frank Nugent.

Media offices
Preceded by Mordaunt Hall	Chief film critic of The New York Times; October 1934 – January 1936	Succeeded by Frank Nugent
