= The Rare Breed =

1966 film

- film poster by Reynold Brown
- Directed by: Andrew V. McLaglen
- Written by: Ric Hardman
- Produced by: William Alland
- Starring: James Stewart; Maureen O'Hara; Brian Keith; Juliet Mills; Don Galloway; David Brian
- Cinematography: William H. Clothier
- Edited by: Russell F. Schoengarth
- Music by: John Williams
- Color process: Technicolor
- Production company: Universal Pictures
- Distributed by: Universal Pictures
- Release date: February 2, 1966
- Running time: 97 minutes
- Country: United States
- Language: English
- Box office: $2 million (est. U.S./ Canada rentals)

The Rare Breed is a 1966 American Western film directed by Andrew V. McLaglen and starring James Stewart, Maureen O'Hara and Brian Keith in Panavision. Loosely based on the life of rancher Col. John William Burgess, the film follows Martha Evans's (O'Hara) quest to fulfill her deceased husband's dream of introducing Hereford cattle to the American West. The film was one of the early major productions to be scored by John Williams, who was billed as "Johnny Williams" in the opening credits.

== Plot ==
In 1884, Martha Evans and her daughter Hilary sail to the United States from England, pursuing the dream of Martha's husband, who dies on board, to bring Hereford cattle to the West. They are left with Hilary's bull, Vindicator.

At auction, Vindicator is the object of a bidding war won by Charles Ellsworth, who has come to purchase stock for his partner, Texas rancher Alexander Bowen. Sam "Bulldog", Burnett, a local wrangler, is hired to transport the bull to Bowen's ranch. Ellsworth bought the bull primarily to woo Martha, who decides to ensure Vindicator's delivery by accompanying him to his destination.

Hilary learns that Burnett has made a deal with competing rancher John Taylor to steal the bull. Hilary does not yet know that Burnett made the deal mostly to ensure that an injured wrangler, double-crossed by Taylor, would receive money to take care of himself and his wife. One of Taylor's men, Deke Simons, gets into a fight with Burnett over the terms of the journey. Martha, witnessing the brawl, comes to trust Burnett. Despite his objections, he accepts responsibility for the Evans women on the train ride to Dodge City and the trip down the wagon trail.

One night while Evans and Burnett have finished brewing coffee over the campfire, a gunshot knocks the coffee pot out of Burnett's hand. Burnett believes that this is a signal from Taylor's men, who find a barbed wire fence that has been cut for the Evanses' wagon to pass. They conclude that Burnett double-crossed them. Simons, determined to catch up with Burnett, shoots his companion and rides after the wagon.

In a canyon, Burnett runs into Jamie Bowen, Alexander's son, who has appropriated a herd of his father's longhorn cattle as payment for his work and is running away to start his own ranch. Simons catches up with Burnett and shoots a cowhand, setting off a stampede. Jamie falls in the path of the cattle and is trampled.

Battered and unconscious, Jamie is carried to the Evanses' wagon. Simons is there, holding Evans and her daughter hostage. He demands the money that Burnett was paid by Taylor for the bull. Simons also demands the women's money, but Burnett grabs his rifle. Simons gallops away; Burnett follows. After their horses collide, Simons falls onto a rock and dies.

Burnett returns with the money, to be berated by Martha for his dishonesty and the trouble he has caused. After a few days of travel, they reach the Bowen ranch.

There, they are introduced to Jamie's father, Alexander Bowen, a retired Scottish military officer turned cattle rancher. Bowen and Burnett insist that the Evans women should leave for the East before they are snowed in, but they refuse to go until Jamie is well and they have taught the men to properly care for Vindicator.

Bowen insists that Hereford cattle cannot survive the tough conditions of North Texas, making them unsuitable for ranching. Martha realizes that until Vindicator proves himself, they will never have the men on their side. Hilary then releases Vindicator into the wild. Jamie insists that he is in love with Hilary, who returns the proclamation. Martha realizes that she needs to stay as well. This suits Bowen and Burnett, who both love her.

A brutal winter arrives; Burnett insists on searching for Vindicator during a blizzard but he fails. Bowen is sure that the bull is dead but tells Burnett that he can have any calves that may have been sired by him. When spring arrives, Burnett finds Vindicator dead under a snowdrift. Reluctantly, Martha agrees to marry Bowen but only after there is no more chance of calves from Vindicator. Burnett finds a crossbred Hereford calf and brings it to Bowen's fort. The two fight over Martha, but Burnett declares his love for her, so Bowen steps aside.

An entire herd of Herefords is seen, with Martha and Burnett musing that they are glad that they kept "a few longhorns, to remember the way it used to be". Hilary and Jamie, now married, join them.

== Cast ==
- James Stewart as Sam Burnett
- Maureen O'Hara as Martha Evans
- Brian Keith as Alexander Bowen
- Juliet Mills as Hilary Price
- Don Galloway as Jamie Bowen
- David Brian as Charles Ellsworth
- Jack Elam as Deke Simons
- Ben Johnson as Jeff Harter
- Harry Carey Jr. as Ed Mabry
- Perry Lopez as Juan
- Larry Domasin as Alberto
- Silvia Marino as Conchita
- Alan Caillou as Taylor
- Gregg Palmer as Rodenbush
- Barbara Werle as Gert
- Joe Ferrante Estaban
- James O'Hara as Sagamon (credited as Jimmy O'Hara)

== Production ==
Portions of the film were shot in the Coachella Valley, California. Train scenes were filmed in the Red Hills area near Jamestown, in Tuolumne County, California, using the famous Sierra Railway 3 locomotive.
