= Mordaunt Hall =

British-American film critic (1878–1973)

- Born: Frederick William Mordaunt Hall; November 1, 1878; Guildford, Surrey, England
- Died: July 2, 1973 (aged 94); New York City, US
- Occupations: Writer, critic

Mordaunt Hall (1 November 1878 – 2 July 1973) was the first regularly assigned motion picture critic for The New York Times, working from October 1924 to September 1934.

His writing style was described in his Times obituary as "chatty, irreverent, and not particularly analytical. [...] The interest of other critics in analyzing cinematographic techniques was not for him."

== Early life ==
Born Frederick William Mordaunt Hall in Guildford, Surrey, England, and known to his friends as "Freddie", he later said his full name was Frederick Wentworth Mordaunt Hall. His father was a school headmaster in Tottenham.

== Early career ==
Hall immigrated to the United States, residing in New York, in 1902 and worked as an advance agent for Buffalo Bill's Wild West show from around 1907, by which time he was already referred to as "an old newspaper man." In 1909, theater impresario Oscar Hammerstein I accused Hall, another New York Press reporter, and a bookmaker of assaulting him. The case was suspended when Hammerstein left for Europe. Hall worked at the New York Press from 1909 to 1914, then joined the New York Herald.

== World War I ==
Hall was commissioned a lieutenant in the Royal Naval Volunteer Reserve during World War I, and did intelligence work. He wrote about the wartime experiences of others in the book Some Naval Yarns (1917). He returned from service in 1919.

== Film criticism ==
In 1919, Hall returned to England, where in the early 1920s he wrote movie intertitles, with young Alfred Hitchcock designing and lettering them, at the Famous Players–Lasky studio in the London borough of Islington. The Halls returned to America in 1922, and his byline first appeared in the New York Times that year.

After retiring from the Times in 1934, he hosted a New York radio program on movies and movie players in 1934–1935, and was a drama critic for the Boston Transcript from 1936 to 1938. On December 10, 1941, two days after the United States entered World War II, Hall became a U.S. citizen. He was working for the Columbia Broadcasting System in New York in 1942. He later joined the Bell Syndicate as a copy editor, and occasionally wrote articles. He died in New York City at age 94.

His successor as chief film critic of the New York Times was Andre Sennwald.

== Personal life ==
He married Helen Rowe, an American, in 1909. She died in 1972.

Media offices
Preceded by Position created	Chief film critic of The New York Times; October 1924-September 1934	Succeeded by Andre Sennwald
