= Ben Johnson: Third Cowboy on the Right =

- Directed by: Tom Thurman
- Written by: Tom Marksbury; Tom Thurman
- Release date: September 1, 1996 (USA)
- Running time: 83 minutes
- Country: United States
- Language: English

Ben Johnson: Third Cowboy on the Right is a 1996 documentary film about the life of actor Ben Johnson. The film was directed by Tom Thurman and written by Thurman and Tom Marksbury.
