= Jack Murray (film editor) =

American film editor

- Born: John Wyncoupe Murray, Jr. May 31, 1900; Macon, Georgia, U.S.
- Died: February 7, 1961 (aged 60); Los Angeles, California, U.S.
- Occupation: Film editor
- Mother: Lois Zellner

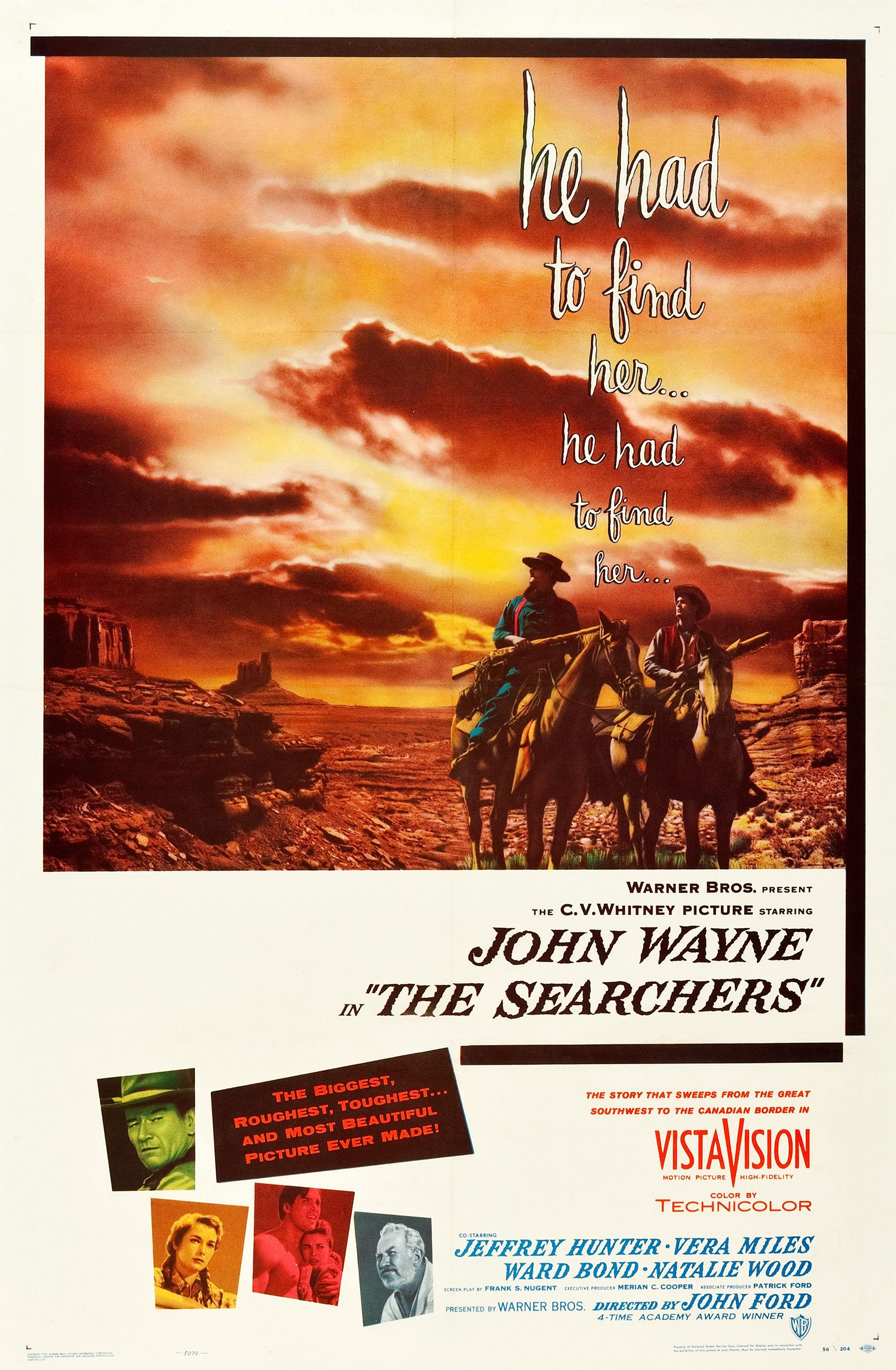
Bill Gold's theatrical poster for The Searchers (1956), which was directed by John Ford and edited by Jack Murray.

Jack Murray (born John Wyncoupe Murray, Jr; May 31, 1900 – February 7, 1961) was an American film editor with about 55 feature film credits between 1929 and 1961. Fifteen of these films were with the director John Ford. Their credited collaborations commenced with The Prisoner of Shark Island (1936), which was produced when both men were working at the 20th Century Fox studio. It encompassed such well-known films as The Quiet Man (1952) and The Searchers (1956), and ended only with Murray's death in 1961.

== Biography ==
Born to John Wyncoup Murray Sr. and Lois Grier, Murray was raised in Georgia. His parents divorced when he was young, and he and his brother Clark followed their mother out to Los Angeles, where she was working as a screenwriter along with her second husband, Arthur J. Zellner (future publicity chief at MGM). Clark Grier Murray became an assistant director.

From 1929 to 1939, Murray had more than 30 feature film credits for the 20th Century-Fox film studio and its predecessors. Among his credits are Will Rogers' final film, In Old Kentucky (1935), and two films starring Shirley Temple (Curly Top (1935) and Poor Little Rich Girl (1936)). In addition to Ford, in this period Murray edited films directed by Irving Cummings, H. Bruce Humberstone, and George Marshall, among others.

After 1939, there are no further feature films crediting Murray until 1947, when he edited a second film with Ford, The Fugitive (1947). This was also the first film produced following the reorganization of Ford's independent production company, Argosy Pictures, which Ford and his partners created to gain more independence of the major studios that controlled most film production in that era. Tag Gallagher notes that, while the film was a disastrous start for Argosy, "in terms of composition, lighting and editing, The Fugitive may be among the most enjoyable pictures." Murray's collaboration with Ford continued through seven more films from Argosy Pictures, which folded after producing The Sun Shines Bright (1953). After The Sun Shines Bright, Murray edited six additional films with Ford.

For his studio films after 1947, Ford worked with other editors as well as with Murray. Thus What Price Glory? (1952) was produced at 20th Century Fox and was edited by Dorothy Spencer, who had previously edited Ford's Stagecoach (1939) and My Darling Clementine (1946). Murray edited Mister Roberts (1955), which was produced by Warner Bros. Murray also occasionally edited with other directors in this period (cf. Tarzan's Peril (1951), The Steel Claw (1961)). Murray's last film with Ford was Two Rode Together (1961); Murray died in 1961. Otho Lovering edited the majority of Ford's films after Murray's death.

Among the most celebrated of the films edited by Murray were The Quiet Man (1952) and The Searchers (1956), both directed by Ford and produced independently of the major studios. The Quiet Man received multiple Academy Award nominations, although not for editing. The Searchers was in the first group of 25 films selected in 1989 for the US National Film Registry. It was ranked as the seventh greatest film ever made on the 2012 decennial international survey of film critics by the British Film Institute.

The period of Murray's collaboration with Ford after 1947 has been summarized by Tag Gallagher as one "distinguished by the vitality of its invention, at every level of cinema, but with particular intensity in montage, motion, and music." The term "montage" refers to the editing of these films. While the individual contributions of Ford and of Murray to the editing of the theatrical release versions of these films aren't well known, Murray was responsible for the first, editor's cuts. Ford rarely set foot in the cutting room. Michael A. Hoey worked as Murray's assistant on Sergeant Rutledge (1960). His memoir suggests that Ford did largely entrust the editing of his films to Murray; Hoey writes of the screening of Murray's cut for Ford that it "... went well with surprisingly few notes, but after all Jack Murray had been editing John Ford's films since 1936's The Prisoner of Shark Island and knew the Old Man's taste better than he did himself."

Murray was elected to membership in the American Cinema Editors shortly after its formation in 1950.

== Filmography ==
=== Films directed by John Ford ===
- The Prisoner of Shark Island (1936)
- The Fugitive (1947)
- 3 Godfathers (1948)
- Fort Apache (1948)
- She Wore a Yellow Ribbon (1949)
- Rio Grande (1950)
- Wagon Master (1950)
- The Quiet Man (1952)
- The Sun Shines Bright (1953)
- Mister Roberts (1955)
- The Searchers (1956)
- The Last Hurrah (1958)
- The Horse Soldiers (1959)
- Sergeant Rutledge (1960)
- Two Rode Together (1961)

=== Additional selected films ===
- Stepping Sisters (1932)
- While Paris Sleeps (1932)
- Me and My Gal (1932)
- The Silent Witness (1932)
- Nancy Steele Is Missing! (1937)

== See also ==
- List of film director and editor collaborations
