= Something Big (film) =

1971 film

- Theatrical release poster
- Directed by: Andrew V. McLaglen
- Written by: James Lee Barrett
- Produced by: James Lee Barrett; Andrew V. McLaglen
- Starring: Dean Martin; Brian Keith; Carol White; Honor Blackman; Ben Johnson
- Cinematography: Harry Stradling Jr.
- Edited by: Robert Simpson
- Music by: Burt Bacharach (title song); Marvin Hamlisch
- Color process: Technicolor
- Distributed by: National General Pictures
- Release date: January 1, 1971 (U.S. release)
- Running time: 108 min
- Country: United States
- Language: English

Something Big is a 1971 American Western comedy film directed by Andrew V. McLaglen. Produced by McLaglen and screenwriter James Lee Barrett, the film stars Dean Martin, Honor Blackman and Brian Keith.

== Plot ==
In the frontier of New Mexico Territory, Joe Baker is an aging bandit determined to do "something big" before his fiancée Dover McBride arrives from the Eastern United States. Dover's brother Tommy is a partner in Baker's banditry.

Baker must deal with outlaw Jonny Cobb and his ruthless sidekick Angel Moon, while also opposing his plan is the cantankerous Colonel Morgan, who is about to retire from the U.S. Army command in the territory while his wife Mary Anna is arriving from the East to accompany him home.

Colonel Morgan learns from his Indian scout Bookbinder that Baker is planning something but cannot learn details. Actually it is to attack and rob a bandit hoard just across the border in Mexico. The treasure being well guarded, Baker makes a deal with Cobb to purchase a Gatling gun in exchange for a woman. Then Baker receives a letter from his fiancée informing him of her imminent arrival, which sets a deadline on the achievement of his "something big."

Baker's gang holds up a series of stagecoaches, but in each he is unable to find a woman suitable for Cobb and lets the passengers go unmolested. He is finally able to find a worthy candidate, who turns out to be Colonel Morgan's wife. She quickly learns to like Baker because he treats her with respect. But the abduction of his wife enrages Morgan, who sets off with a patrol to rescue her and capture Baker.

Cobb and sidekick Moon meet the trader Malachi Morton in the desert to buy the gun, which has been stolen from a federal arsenal. When the trader demands more than what they agreed, Moon hurls his knife into Morton's chest, instantly killing him. Before they can meet Baker for the handover, however, they are accosted by Morgan and his scout Bookbinder, who agree to let the bandits go if they reveal Baker's location.

Baker's fiancé Dover arrives at the fort and installs herself in Morgan's quarters. Hearing of her arrival, Baker agrees to meet her in the desert. She gives him an ultimatum to go home with her immediately after achieving his plan or she will marry someone else.

The night before the supposed rendezvous with Cobb to purchase the gun, Baker realizes he is in love with Mary Anna. He attempts to kiss her, but she rebuffs him, stating she is in love with her husband. Nevertheless, Baker tells Tommy that he intends to take the gun from Cobb without giving Mary Anna to him.

Morgan and his scout, with Cobb, Moon and the gun in tow, arrive at Baker's hideout and Angel Moon is killed when he attempts to kill Baker. Morgan proceeds to attack Baker with his fists but stops when his wife says how well Baker has treated her. And when he refuses to give Baker the gun, his wife reminds him that he is now officially retired and no longer has the authority to seize the gun as federal property.

Cobb realizes he is not going to get his woman and breaks down, but Morgan realizes that there is a solution, namely a pair of lonely women that he and Bookbinder had encountered earlier. When Cobb arrives, the women roughly throw him off his horse and gleefully drag him to their shack.

Baker and his men assault the bandit's town in Mexico, with the help of the Apache allies they have previously paid with whiskey. They are informed that the notorious bandit Emilio Estevez is now a monk. Baker suspects a ruse and pulls open the monk's robe, revealing a pistol. A gun battle erupts which the outnumbered Baker is losing until he mounts the wagon with the Gatling gun and mows down the opposition. Baker finds the bandit's treasure in the town church, but as his men celebrate their riches, he is haunted by Dover's parting words.

Back at the fort, Morgan receives an emotional farewell from his assembled troops. Baker, Dover, Morgan and Mary Anna board the stagecoach to return to the East. As they ride out, Baker climbs out on top and drinks to the health of his men riding alongside.

== Cast ==
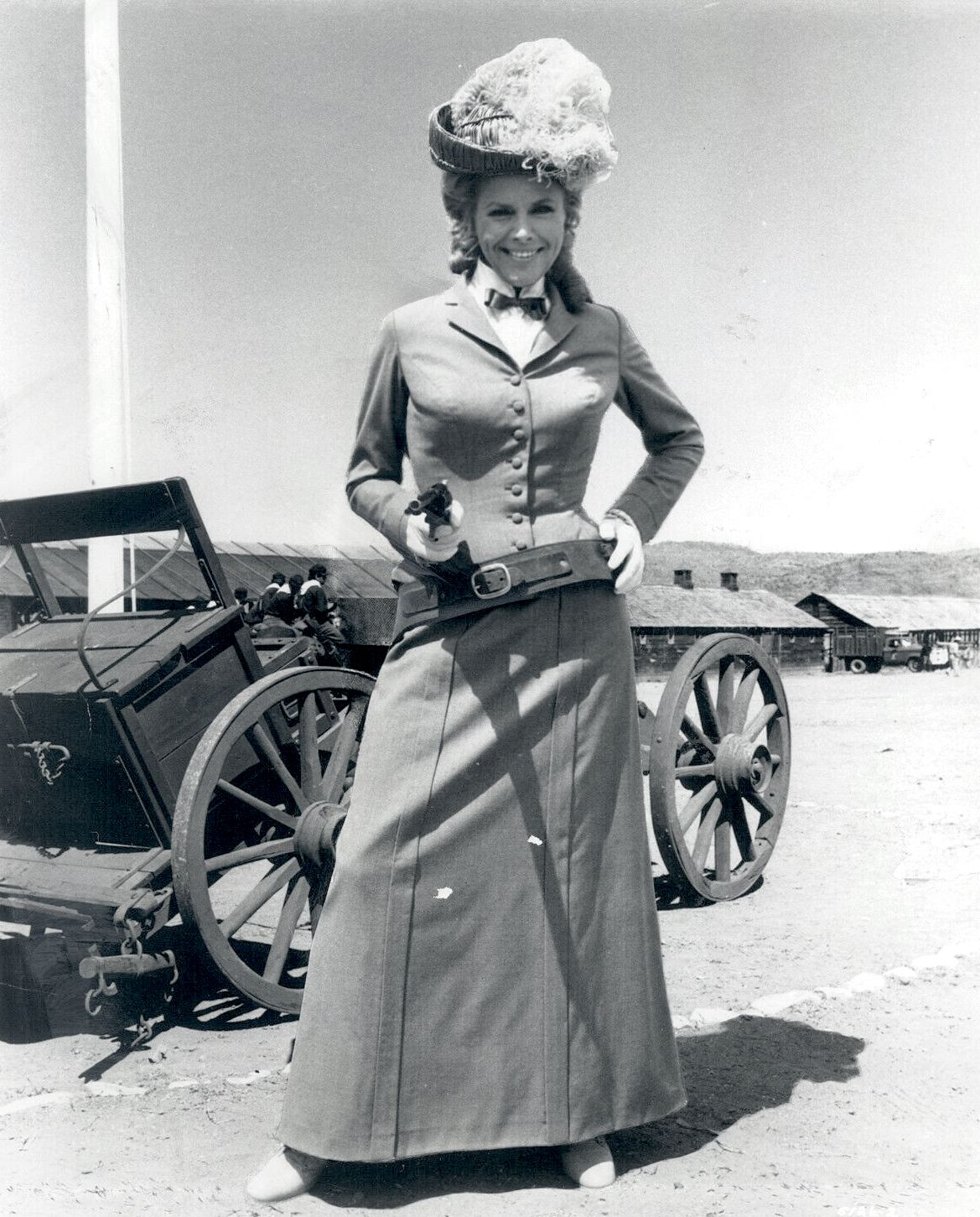
Honor Blackman on set

- Dean Martin as Joe Baker
- Brian Keith as Colonel Morgan
- Carol White as Dover McBride
- Honor Blackman as Mary Anna Morgan
- Ben Johnson as Jesse Bookbinder
- Albert Salmi as Jonny Cobb
- Don Knight as Tommy McBride
- Joyce Van Patten as Polly Standall
- Judi Meredith as Carrie Standall
- Denver Pyle as Junior Frisbee
- Merlin Olsen as Sergeant Fitzsimmons
- Robert Donner as Angel Moon
- Harry Carey, Jr. as Joe Pickins
- Paul Fix as Chief Yellow Sun
- David Huddleston as Malachi Morton
- Bob Steele as Stagecoach Driver

== Reception ==
Vincent Canby of The New York Times found it perversely humorous: "Like being stuck on a subway, or bearing witness to a mugging on the other side of the street, watching Something Big is a group experience of a contemporary, if secondary, order. ... Mr. Martin grins his way through it, wearing an extremely handsome, well-cut suede coat. He is the centerpiece of a fiction that occasionally recalls the sentimentality of John Ford, with mock seriousness, as well as the inane cheeriness of those TV Westerns whose heroes never die, but just go into reruns."
