= Frank Nugent =

Screenwriter, film critic (1908–1965)

- Born: Frank Stanley Nugent; May 27, 1908; New York City, US
- Died: December 29, 1965 (aged 57); Los Angeles, California, US
- Education: Columbia University
- Occupations: Screenwriter, journalist
- Years active: 1929–1965

Frank Stanley Nugent (May 27, 1908 – December 29, 1965) was an American screenwriter, journalist, and film reviewer. He wrote 21 film scripts, 11 for director John Ford. He wrote almost a thousand reviews for The New York Times before leaving journalism for Hollywood. He was nominated for an Academy Award in 1953 and twice won the Writers Guild of America Award for Best Written American Comedy. The Writers Guild of America, West ranks his screenplay for The Searchers (1956) among the top 101 screenplays of all time.

== Early life and film criticism ==
Nugent was born in New York City on May 27, 1908, the son of Frank H. and Rebecca Roggenburg Nugent. He graduated from Regis High School in 1925 and studied journalism at Columbia University, graduating in 1929, where he worked on the student newspaper, the Columbia Spectator. He started his journalism career as a news reporter with The New York Times in 1929 and in 1934 moved to reviewing films for that newspaper. At the end of 1936 Nugent succeeded Andre Sennwald as its motion picture editor and critic, and held the post until 1940. In that position he wrote very favorable reviews of Show Boat (1936), and of The Wizard of Oz and Gone with the Wind (1939).

One account of his output at the Times says that "He was known for his acerbic wit and poison-tipped pen, and even his news articles had verve and voice; his features were chatty, clever, and intimate, if occasionally smug." Nugent praised director John Ford without reservation, writing of Stagecoach in 1939:

In one superbly expansive gesture ... John Ford has swept aside ten years of artifice and talkie compromise and has made a motion picture that sings a song of camera. It moves, and how beautifully it moves ... through all the old-fashioned, but never really out-dated, periods of prairie travel in the scalp-raising Seventies, when Geronimo's Apaches were on the warpath. Here, in a sentence, is a movie of the grand old school, a genuine rib-thumper and a beautiful sight to see.

Of Ford's The Grapes of Wrath, released the following year, he wrote:

In the vast library where the celluloid literature of the screen is stored there is one small, uncrowded shelf devoted to the cinema's masterworks, to those films which by dignity of theme and excellence of treatment seem to be of enduring artistry, seem destined to be recalled not merely at the end of their particular year but whenever great motion pictures are mentioned. To that shelf of screen classics Twentieth Century-Fox yesterday added its version of John Steinbeck's The Grapes of Wrath....
Its greatness as a picture lies in many things, not all of them readily reducible to words. It is difficult, for example, to discuss John Ford's direction, except in pictorial terms. His employment of camera is reportage and editorial and dramatization by turns or all in one. Steinbeck described the Dust Bowl and its farmers, used page on page to do it. Ford's cameras turn off a white-striped highway, follow Tom Joad scuffling through the dust to the empty farmhouse, see through Muley's eyes the pain of surrendering the land and the hopelessness of trying to resist the tractors. A swift sequence or two, and all that Steinbeck said has been said and burned indelibly into memory by a director, a camera and a cast.

His critiques were sometimes sharp-tongued. He called Mannequin with Joan Crawford and Spencer Tracy a "glib, implausible and smart-gowned little drama, as typical Metro-Goldwyn-Mayer as Leo himself". Of The Hunchback of Notre Dame (1939), he wrote: "The film is almost unrelievedly brutal and without the saving grace of unreality which makes Frankenstein's horrors a little comic." He aimed his barbs at individuals as well, like "the screen's latest leading man, John Trent, former transport pilot. Mr. Trent is square-jawed, rangy and solidly masculine. Eventually he may deteriorate and become an actor as well."

He particularly disliked the work of Tyrone Power for 20th Century Fox, and began his review of The Story of Alexander Graham Bell (1939) by saying: "If only because it has omitted Tyrone Power, 20th Century Fox's [picture] must be considered one of that company's more sober and meritorious contributions to the historical drama." In response, Fox and the theater that presented the film reduced their advertising in The New York Times for months, costing the paper $50,000. His review of Fox's The Grapes of Wrath led to an offer from Fox studio head Darryl F. Zanuck to work as a script editor for $400 a week, a very generous salary at the time. By then he had written almost a thousand film reviews for the Times.

== Career in films ==
Nugent continued to write for the Times on a freelance basis during his first several years in Hollywood. For Zanuck he worked on scripts, reviewing others' screenplays and providing criticism. He said later that "Zanuck told me he didn't want me to write, that he just thought the studio would save money if I criticized the pictures before they were made." Fox terminated him in 1944 and Nugent turned to work as a freelance writer. His sharp critiques served Zanuck, but won him no screenwriting work, while his criticism of his colleagues' work, just as clever as when he was a journalist, was not designed to win collaborators. He returned one script to Zanuck with a note saying: "My opinion of this script is unchanged. As far as I'm concerned, there's nothing wrong with it that a waste basket can't cure."

Nugent was working on a magazine article about The Fugitive (1947), while the film was being shot, when he met the film director John Ford on the set in Mexico. Their meeting led to Nugent's long and fruitful association with the John Ford Stock Company. Ford hired him to work on his next film, Fort Apache (1948), and Nugent wrote screenplays for several more of Ford's westerns, including 3 Godfathers (also 1948), She Wore a Yellow Ribbon (1949), Wagon Master (1950) and The Searchers. Of the 21 film scripts Nugent worked on, 11 were for Ford. They had a difficult working relationship, as did everyone who worked with Ford, but Nugent later said "it was a small price to pay for working with the best director in Hollywood." In assessing their work together, Glenn Frankel credits Nugent with providing Ford with more sophisticated male-female relationships than his other scripts and tempering the racism so endemic to the western genre's portrayal of Native Americans. Nugent's screenplay for Fort Apache, for example, altered his source material's "visceral loathing" for the Indigenous characters, transforming them into "victims of government-sanctioned criminal exploitation". In the place of like-minded Native leaders, he introduced contrast between the young, hot-blooded warrior and the wiser veteran, which became a standard feature of the Hollywood western.

His screenplay for The Searchers (1956) has been ranked among the top 101 screenplays of all time by the Writers Guild of America, West. It was named the greatest western of all time by the American Film Institute in 2008. It placed 12th on the American Film Institute's 2007 list of the 100 Greatest American Films.

He wrote other westerns for Stuart Heisler (Tulsa), for Robert Wise (Two Flags West), for Raoul Walsh (The Tall Men), and for Phil Karlson (They Rode West and Gunman's Walk). Nugent also worked on Mister Roberts.

His screenplays in other genres include The Red Beret, North West Frontier, Trouble in the Glen, The Quiet Man, The Rising of the Moon and Donovan's Reef.

For his work on for The Quiet Man, he received a nomination for the Academy Award for Writing Adapted Screenplay. The Quiet Man won the Writers Guild of America Award for Best Written American Comedy in 1953 and he won the same award in 1956 for Mister Roberts (1955).

Of his long association with Ford, Nugent once wrote:

I have often wondered why Ford chose me to write his cavalry films. I had been on a horse but once—and to our mutual humiliation. I had never seen an Indian. My knowledge of the Civil War extended only slightly beyond the fact that there was a North and a South, with West vulnerable and East dealing. I did know a Remington from a Winchester—Remington was the painter. In view of all this, I can only surmise that Ford picked me for Fort Apache as a challenge.

Nugent served as the President of the Writers Guild of America, West (WGAW) from 1957 to 1958 and as its representative on the Motion Picture Industry Council from 1954 to 1959. He also served a three-year stint (1956–59) as chairman of the building fund committee that oversaw the construction of its headquarters in Beverly Hills.

== Personal life ==
On January 3, 1939, he married Dorothy J. Rivers. New York Mayor Fiorello LaGuardia performed the ceremony in his City Hall chambers. They divorced in 1952. He married his second wife, Jean Lavell, in 1953.

Nugent suffered from heart problems for several years before dying of a heart attack on December 29, 1965, in Los Angeles.

== Feature film screenwriting credits ==
Credited as Frank S. Nugent or Frank Nugent for screenplay or the story that provides the basis for the screenplay.

- Fort Apache, 1948 ‡
- 3 Godfathers, 1948 ‡
- Tulsa, 1949
- She Wore a Yellow Ribbon, 1949 ‡
- Wagon Master, 1950 ‡
- Two Flags West, 1950
- The Quiet Man, 1952 ‡
- Angel Face, 1953
- Paratrooper, released in the UK as The Red Beret, 1953
- They Rode West, 1954
- Trouble in the Glen, 1954
- Mister Roberts, 1955 ‡
- The Tall Men, 1955
- The Searchers, 1956 ‡
- The Rising of the Moon, 1957 ‡
- Gunman's Walk, 1958
- The Last Hurrah, 1958 ‡
- North West Frontier, 1959
- Two Rode Together, 1961 ‡
- Donovan's Reef, 1963 ‡
- Incident at Phantom Hill, 1966

Table key
‡ Indicates films directed by John Ford

== Additional sources ==
- Richard Corliss, Talking Pictures: Screenwriters in the American Cinema, 1927-1973 (Overlook Press, 1974)
- Arleen Keylin and Christine Bent., eds, The New York Times at the Movies (Arno Press, 1979), ISBN 0-405-12415-5
- Peter Lehman, Close Viewings: An Anthology of New Film Criticism (University Press of Florida, 1990), ISBN 0-8130-0967-7
- Joseph McBride, "The Pathological Hero's Conscience: Screenwriter Frank S. Nugent Was the Quiet Man Behind John Ford", Written By, May 2001

Media offices
Preceded by Andre Sennwald	Chief film critic of The New York Times; 1936-1940	Succeeded by Bosley Crowther
