= Joanne Dru =

American actress (1922–1996)

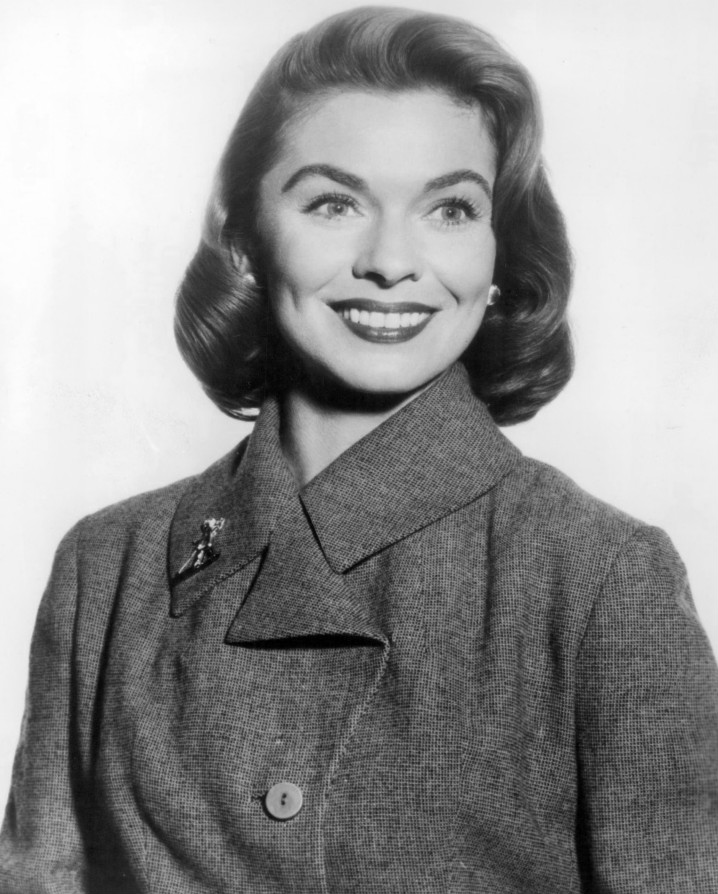
- Dru in 1960
- Born: Joan Letitia LaCock; January 31, 1922; Logan, West Virginia, U.S.
- Died: September 10, 1996 (aged 74); Los Angeles, California, U.S.
- Occupation: Actress
- Years active: 1946–1980
- Political party: Republican
- Spouses: Dick Haymes (m. 1941; div. 1949) John Ireland (m. 1949; div. 1957) George Pierose (m. 1963; died 1972) C. V. Wood (m. 1972; died 1992)
- Children: 3
- Relatives: Peter Marshall (brother); Pete LaCock (nephew)

Joanne Dru (born Joan Letitia LaCock; January 31, 1922 – September 10, 1996) was an American film and television actress, known for such films as Red River, She Wore a Yellow Ribbon, All the King's Men, and Wagon Master.

== Career ==
Born in Logan, West Virginia, Dru moved to New York City in 1940 at the age of eighteen. After finding employment as a model, she was chosen by Al Jolson to appear in the cast of his Broadway show Hold On to Your Hats. When she moved to Hollywood, she found work in the theater. Dru was spotted by a talent scout and made her first film appearance in Abie's Irish Rose (1946). Over the next decade, Dru appeared frequently in films and on television. She was often cast in western films such as Howard Hawks's Red River (1948), and the John Ford productions She Wore a Yellow Ribbon (1949), and Wagon Master (1950).

She gave a well-received performance in the dramatic film All the King's Men (1949), which went on to win the Academy Award for Best Picture, played a college graduate turned gangster's unhappy moll opposite Edmund O'Brien in the crime noir 711 Ocean Drive (1950), and co-starred with Dan Dailey in The Pride of St. Louis (1952), about major-league baseball pitcher Jerome "Dizzy" Dean. She appeared in the James Stewart drama Thunder Bay in 1953 and then the Martin and Lewis comedy 3 Ring Circus (1954). Her film career lessened by the end of the 1950s, but she continued working frequently in television, most notably as Babs Hooten on the 1960–61 ABC sitcom, Guestward, Ho!

After Guestward, Ho!, she appeared sporadically for the rest of the 1960s and the first half of the 1970s, with one feature film appearance, in Sylvia (1965), and eight television appearances.

For her contribution to the television industry, Dru was awarded a star on the Hollywood Walk of Fame.

== Personal life ==
She was the elder sister of Peter Marshall, an actor and singer best known as the original host of the American game show Hollywood Squares. Dru married popular vocalist and actor Dick Haymes in 1941. The couple had three children. Divorced from Haymes in 1949, Dru married Red River and All the King's Men co-star John Ireland less than a month later. The pair divorced in 1957. She had no children from her marriage to Ireland or two subsequent marriages.

She was a staunch Republican, supporting Barry Goldwater in the 1964 United States presidential election and appeared at a 1968 GOP cocktail party fundraiser for Richard Nixon.

== Death ==
Dru died in Los Angeles, California on September 10, 1996, aged 74, from a respiratory ailment that developed from lymphedema, a result of chemotherapy she had received over her lifetime, according to her brother. Her ashes were scattered into the Pacific Ocean.

== Selected filmography ==
- Abie's Irish Rose (1946) – Rosemary Murphy Levy
- Red River (1948) – Tess Millay
- She Wore a Yellow Ribbon (1949) – Olivia Dandridge
- All the King's Men (1949) – Anne Stanton
- Wagon Master (1950) – Denver
- 711 Ocean Drive (1950) – Gail Mason
- Vengeance Valley (1951) – Jen Strobie
- Mr. Belvedere Rings the Bell (1951) – Miss Harriet Tripp
- Return of the Texan (1952) – Ann Marshall
- The Pride of St. Louis (1952) – Patricia Nash Dean
- My Pal Gus (1952) – Lydia Marble
- Thunder Bay (1953) – Stella Rigaud
- Hannah Lee (1953) – Hannah Lee (Hallie McLaird)
- Forbidden (1953) – Christine Lawrence Manard
- Duffy of San Quentin (1954) – Anne Halsey
- Southwest Passage (1954) – Lilly
- Siege at Red River (1954) – Nora Curtis
- 3 Ring Circus (1954) – Jill Brent
- Day of Triumph (1954) – Mary Magdalene
- The Dark Avenger or The Warriors (1955) – Lady Joan Holland
- Sincerely Yours (1955) – Marion Moore
- Hell on Frisco Bay (1956) – Marcia Rollins
- Drango (1957) – Kate Calder
- The Light in the Forest (1958) – Milly Elder
- The Wild and the Innocent (1959) – Marcy
- September Storm (1960) – Anne Traymore
- Sylvia (1965) – Jane (Bronson) Phillips
- Super Fuzz (Poliziotto superpiù) (1980) – Rosy Labouche (final film role)

== Radio appearances ==
Program	Episode	Date	Notes
Stars over Hollywood	Pattern in the Rug	May 10, 1952	
Hollywood Star Playhouse	Match Point	January 4, 1953	
