= Ben Johnson (actor) =

American actor and stuntman (1918–1996)

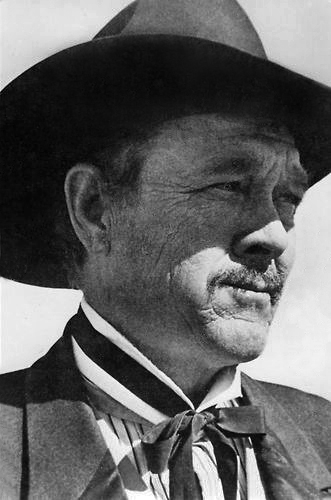
- Johnson in 1969
- Born: Francis Benjamin Johnson Jr. June 13, 1918; Foraker, Oklahoma, U.S.
- Died: April 8, 1996 (aged 77); Mesa, Arizona, U.S.
- Resting place: Pawhuska City Cemetery
- Occupations: Actor; stuntman; rodeo cowboy
- Years active: 1939–1996
- Spouse: Carol Elaine Jones (m. 1941; died 1994)

Francis Benjamin Johnson Jr. (June 13, 1918 – April 8, 1996) was an American actor, stuntman, and professional rodeo cowboy.

The son of an Oklahoma rancher, Johnson arrived in Hollywood to deliver a consignment of horses for a film. He worked as a stuntman and horse wrangler, before breaking into acting with the help of John Ford. His droll manner and expert horsemanship brought authenticity to his many roles in Westerns.

An elegiac portrayal of a former cowboy theater owner in the coming-of-age drama The Last Picture Show won Johnson the 1971 Academy Award, BAFTA Award, and Golden Globe Award for Best Supporting Actor. In addition to his film career, he won the 1953 Rodeo Cowboys Association's (RCA) Team Roping World Championship, and was inducted into the ProRodeo Hall of Fame in 1979.

== Early life ==
Johnson was born in Foraker, Oklahoma, on the Osage Indian Reservation. He believed he was of Irish and Cherokee ancestry, though this turned out not to be accurate; genealogists have found his ancestors came to America almost exclusively from England and Scotland. However, his claims to partial Native American ancestry were legitimate and accurate, his maternal grandmother being a registered citizen of the Osage Nation. He was the son of Ollie Susan Johnson (née Workmon) and Ben Johnson Sr. His father was a rancher and rodeo champion in Osage County. Johnson followed in his father's footsteps, working as a ranch hand from an early age and later becoming a world-champion rodeo cowboy.

== Film career ==
Johnson parlayed his equestrian skills into a film career in the late 1930s, first arriving in Hollywood to deliver a consignment of horses for a film. He credited Howard Hughes with launching his career, when the director hired him as a horse wrangler and stuntman on the 1943 film The Outlaw. He liked to say later that he got to Hollywood in a carload of horses.

His work as a stuntman caught the eye of director John Ford, who hired Johnson for stunt work in the 1948 film Fort Apache, and as the riding double for Henry Fonda. During shooting, the horses pulling a wagon with three men in it stampeded. Johnson, who "happened to be settin' on a horse", stopped the runaway wagon and saved the men. When Ford promised that he would be rewarded, Johnson hoped it would be with another doubling job, or maybe a small speaking role. Instead, he received a seven-year acting contract from Ford. Ford called Johnson into his office, and handed him an envelope with a contract in it. Johnson started reading it, and when he got to the fifth line and it said "$5,000 a week," he stopped reading, grabbed a pen, signed it, and gave it back to Ford.

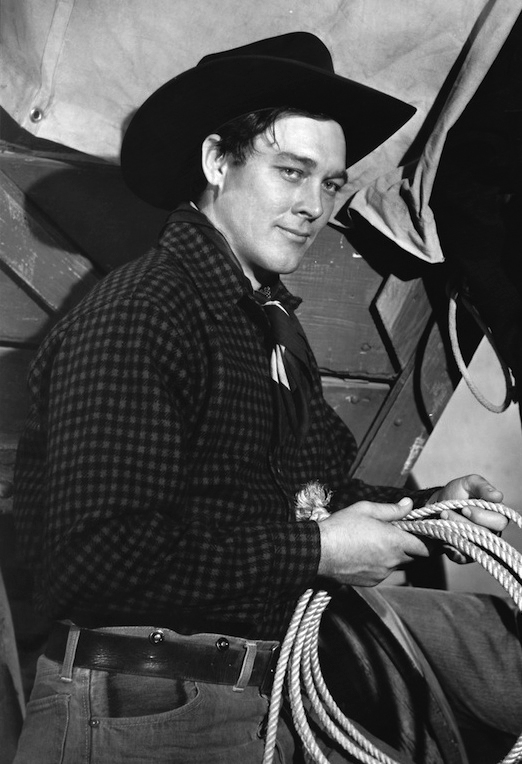
Johnson in Wagon Master (1950)

His first credited role was in Ford's 3 Godfathers; the film is notable for the riding skills demonstrated by both Johnson and star Pedro Armendáriz. He later said the film was the most physically challenging of his career. Ford then suggested a starring role for him in the 1949 film Mighty Joe Young; he played Gregg opposite Terry Moore. Ford cast him in the remaining two of the three films that have come to be known as Ford's cavalry trilogy, all starring John Wayne: She Wore a Yellow Ribbon (1949), and Rio Grande (1950) joining Fort Apache. Both roles showcased Johnson's riding ability. Ford also cast Johnson as the lead in Wagon Master (1950), one of Ford's favorites.

In real life Johnson's demeanor was calm but firm; even in tense situations he did not show any bad temper. And though known for avoiding drama, he had definite boundaries, both in life and as an actor. During the making of Rio Grande he defied Ford, who was notorious for browbeating his actors, and reportedly told him to go to hell. Johnson thought the incident had been forgotten, but Ford did not use him in a film for over a decade. Johnson also appeared in four films of tempestuous director Sam Peckinpah and had a good relationship with him, with Peckinpah appreciating Johnson's authenticity and lack of acting airs.

Johnson played in supporting roles in Shane (1953), where he appeared as Chris Calloway, a "bad guy who makes good" after being beaten senseless by Alan Ladd, and One-Eyed Jacks (1961) starring Marlon Brando. In 1964, he worked with Ford again in Cheyenne Autumn. The Peckinpah-directed films included Major Dundee (1965, with Charlton Heston), The Wild Bunch (1969, with William Holden and Robert Ryan), and two back-to-back starring Steve McQueen, The Getaway and Junior Bonner, a rodeo film, (both 1972). In 1973, he co-starred as Melvin Purvis in John Milius' Dillinger with Warren Oates; he also appeared in Milius' 1984 film Red Dawn. In 1975, he played the character Mister in Bite the Bullet, starring Gene Hackman and James Coburn. He also appeared with Charles Bronson in 1975's Breakheart Pass. In 1980, he was cast as Sheriff Isum Gorch in Soggy Bottom U.S.A.

Johnson played Bartlett in the 1962–63 season of Have Gun Will Travel, which featured a short scene of his riding skills. In 1963, Johnson appeared as Spinner on the TV Western The Virginian in the episode titled "Duel at Shiloh". In the 1966–67 television season, Johnson appeared as the character Sleeve in all 26 episodes of the ABC family Western The Monroes with co-stars Michael Anderson Jr. and Barbara Hershey.

He teamed up with John Wayne again, and director Andrew V. McLaglen, in two films, appearing with Rock Hudson in The Undefeated (1969) and in a fairly prominent role in Chisum (1970). The apex of Johnson's career was reached in 1971 with his performance as Sam the Lion in Peter Bogdanovich's The Last Picture Show earning him an Academy Award for Best Supporting Actor. Johnson was reluctant to do the movie because of the lengthy dialogue but reportedly he was convinced to do the movie because of Ford persuading him. At the awards ceremony, Johnson made sure to thank a wide variety of people from Bogdanovich to Ford, closing, "This couldn't have happened to a nicer feller. Thank you."

On the set of The Train Robbers, in June 1972, he told Nancy Anderson of Copley News Service that winning the Oscar for The Last Picture Show was not going to change him and he would not raise his salary request to studios because of it. He continued, "I grew up on a ranch and I know livestock, so I like working in Westerns. All my life I've been afraid of failure. To avoid it, I've stuck with doing things I know how to do, and it's made me a good living".

He played Cap Roundtree in the 1979 miniseries The Sacketts. He played Sam Bellows in the 1980 film Ruckus and Jack Mason in the 1984 action adventure Red Dawn. He co-starred in the 1994 version of Angels in the Outfield.

He continued ranching during the entire time, operating a horse-breeding ranch in Sylmar, California. In addition, he sponsored the Ben Johnson Pro Celebrity Team Roping and Penning competition in Oklahoma City, the proceeds from which benefitted Children's Medical Research Inc. and the Children's Hospital of Oklahoma.

== Rodeo championship ==
In 1953, he took a break from well-paid film work to compete in the Rodeo Cowboys Association (RCA), becoming the Team Roping World Champion; although he only broke even financially that year. Johnson was inducted into the ProRodeo Hall of Fame in 1979. According to his ProRodeo Hall of Fame entry, he said, "I've won a rodeo world championship, and I'm prouder of that than anything else I've ever done."

== Personal life ==
Johnson's 1941 marriage to Carol Elaine Jones lasted until her death on March 27, 1994. They had no children. She was the daughter of noted Hollywood horse wrangler Clarence "Fat" Jones. Johnson continued to work almost steadily until his death.

Johnson also operated a horse-breeding ranch throughout his career. Although he said he had succeeded by sticking to what he knew, shrewd real estate investments made Johnson worth an estimated $100 million by his later years.

=== Death ===
On April 8, 1996, aged 77, Johnson collapsed and died from a heart attack while visiting his then 96-year-old mother Ollie at Leisure World in Mesa, Arizona, the suburban Phoenix retirement community where they both lived. Johnson's body was later transported from Arizona to Pawhuska, Oklahoma, for burial at the Pawhuska City Cemetery.

Ollie Johnson died on October 16, 2000, aged 101.

== Legacy ==
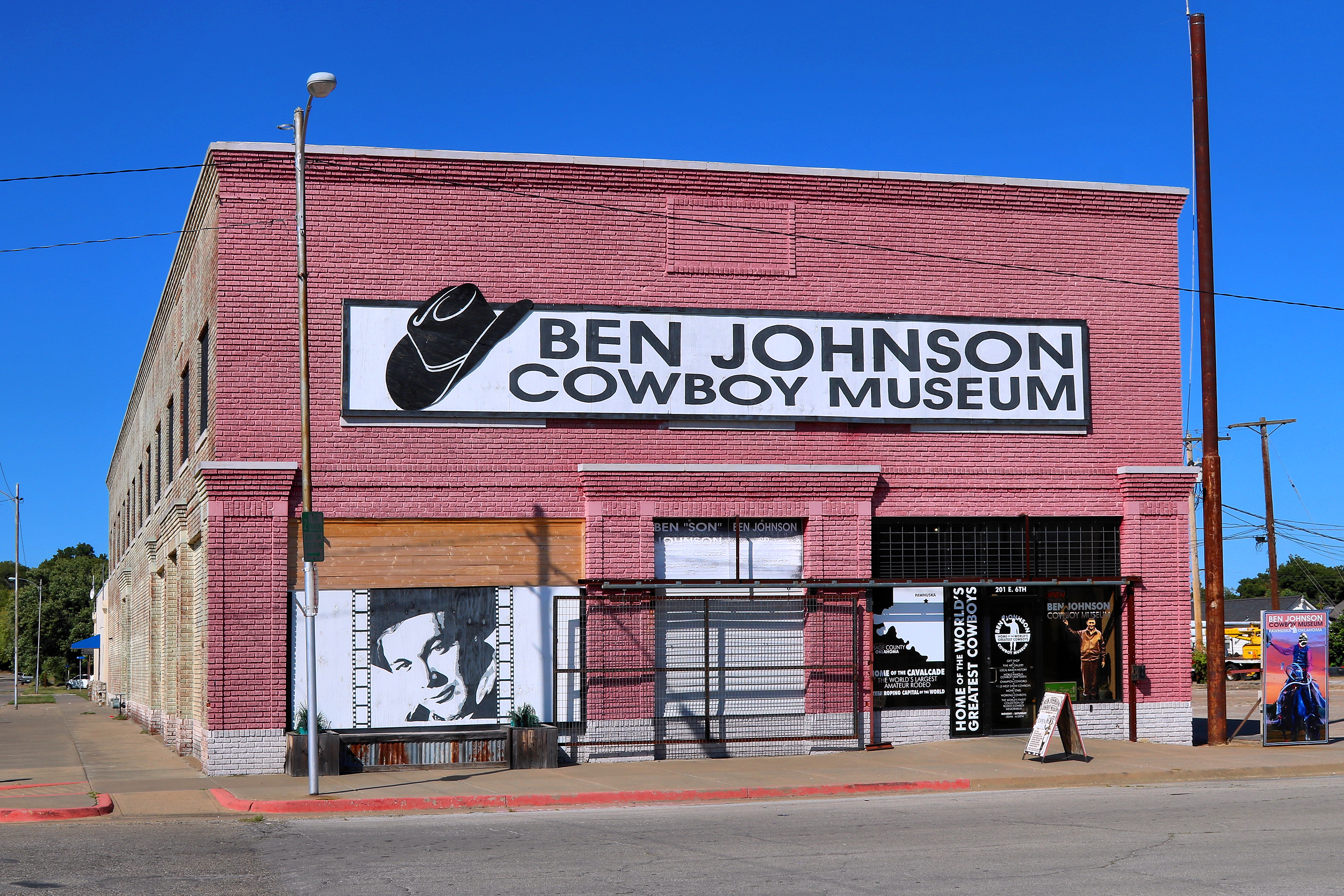
The Ben Johnson Cowboy Museum in Pawhuska, Oklahoma.

For his contribution to the motion picture industry, Johnson has a star on the Hollywood Walk of Fame at 7083 Hollywood Boulevard. In 1982, he was inducted into the Western Performers Hall of Fame at the National Cowboy & Western Heritage Museum in Oklahoma City. In 2003 Johnson was inducted into the Texas Trail of Fame.

In 1996, Tom Thurman made a documentary film about Johnson's life, titled Ben Johnson: Third Cowboy on the Right, written by Thurman and Tom Marksbury. To date, he is the only person to have won both a world rodeo championship and an Oscar.

The Ben Johnson Cowboy Museum was opened in honor of Johnson in his hometown of Pawhuska in June 2019. The museum showcases the life and career of Johnson and his father Ben Johnson Sr., who was also a world-champion cowboy. In addition to the Johnsons, the museum also features other world-champion cowboys and cowgirls, famous ranches (like the one Johnson grew up on), and cowboy artists and craftsmen, all from the area where Johnson grew up.

The Ben Johnson Memorial Steer Roping and the International Roundup Cavalcade, the world's largest amateur rodeo, are held annually in Pawhuska, Oklahoma.

A one-and-a-quarter-sized bronze sculpture by John D. Free of Ben Johnson riding a horse and roping a steer was commissioned and produced in Pawhuska, Oklahoma.

== Filmography ==
=== Film ===
Year	Title	Role	Notes
1939	The Fighting Gringo	Mexican Barfly	Uncredited
1943	The Outlaw	Deputy	Uncredited
1943	Bordertown Gun Fighters	Messenger	Uncredited
1944	The Pinto Bandit	Race Contestant	Uncredited
1944	Tall in the Saddle	Townsman	Uncredited
1944	Nevada	Saloon Patron	Uncredited
1945	Corpus Christi Bandits	2nd Stagecoach Driver	Uncredited
1945	The Naughty Nineties	Coach Driver	Uncredited
1946	Badman's Territory	Deputy Marshal	Uncredited
1947	Wyoming	Cowhand	Uncredited
1947	Angel and the Badman	Stuntman	Uncredited
1948	The Gallant Legion	Texas Ranger	Uncredited
1948	3 Godfathers	Posse Man	
1949	She Wore a Yellow Ribbon	Sergeant Tyree	
1949	Mighty Joe Young	Gregg	
1950	Wagon Master	Travis Blue	
1950	Rio Grande	Trooper Travis Tyree	
1951	Fort Defiance	Ben Shelby	
1952	Wild Stallion	Dan Light	
1953	Shane	Chris Calloway	
1955	Oklahoma!	Wrangler	Uncredited
1956	Rebel in Town	Frank Mason	
1957	War Drums	Luke Fargo	
1957	Slim Carter	Montana Burriss	
1958	Fort Bowie	Captain Thomas Thompson	
1960	Ten Who Dared	George Bradley	
1961	One-Eyed Jacks	Bob Amory	
1961	Tomboy and the Champ	Jim Wilkins	
1964	Cheyenne Autumn	Trooper Plumtree	Uncredited
1965	Major Dundee	Sergeant Chillum	
1966	The Rare Breed	Jeff Harter	
1968	Will Penny	Alex	
1968	Hang 'Em High	Marshal Dave Bliss	
1969	The Wild Bunch	Tector Gorch	
1969	The Undefeated	Short Grub	
1970	Chisum	James Pepper	
1971	The Last Picture Show	Sam the Lion	
1971	Something Big	Jesse Bookbinder	
1972	Corky	Boland	
1972	Junior Bonner	Buck Roan	
1972	The Getaway	Jack Beynon	
1973	The Train Robbers	Jesse	
1973	The Wayne Train	Himself / Jesse	Documentary short
1973	Kid Blue	Sheriff 'Mean John' Simpson	
1973	Dillinger	Melvin Purvis	
1974	The Sugarland Express	Captain Tanner	
1975	Bite the Bullet	Mister	
1975	Breakheart Pass	Marshal Pearce	
1975	Hustle	Marty Hollinger	
1976	The Town That Dreaded Sundown	Captain J.D. Morales	
1977	The Greatest	Hollis	
1977	Grayeagle	John Colter	
1978	The Swarm	Felix Austin	
1980	The Hunter	Sheriff Strong	
1980	Ruckus	Sam Bellows	
1980	Terror Train	Carne	
1981	Soggy Bottom U.S.A.	Sheriff Isum Gorch	
1982	Tex	Cole Collins	
1983	Champions	Burly Cocks	
1984	Red Dawn	Jack Mason	
1986	Let's Get Harry	Harry Burck Sr.	
1986	Trespasses	August Klein	
1988	Cherry 2000	Six-Fingered Jake	
1988	Dark Before Dawn	The Sheriff	
1989	The Last Ride	Cowboy	Short film
1989	Hollywood on Horses	Himself	Documentary
1990	Back to Back	Eli Hix	
1991	My Heroes Have Always Been Cowboys	Jesse Dalton	
1992	Radio Flyer	Geronimo Bill	
1994	Angels in the Outfield	Hank Murphy	
1994	Outlaws: The Legend of O.B. Taggart	Jack Parrish	
1996	Ben Johnson: Third Cowboy on the Right	Himself	Documentary
1996	The Evening Star	Dr. Arthur Cotton	Posthumous release

==== Stunt credits ====
Year	Title	Notes
1940	The Durango Kid	Stunt double: Charles Starrett
1943	The Outlaw	Stunt performer & horse wrangler
1943	Riders of the Northwest Mounted	Stunt performer
1943	Riders of the Rio Grande	Stunt performer
1943	Bordertown Gun Fighters	Stunt performer
1943	Arizona Trail	Stunt performer
1943	Blazing Guns	Stunt performer
1943	Tarzan's Desert Mystery	Stunt performer
1944	Tall in the Saddle	Stunt performer
1944	The Old Texas Trail	Stunt performer
1944	Nevada	Stunt double: Robert Mitchum
1945	Corpus Christi Bandits	Stunt performer
1945	Santa Fe Saddlemates	Stunt double: Sunset Carson
1945	The Naughty Nineties	Stunt performer
1946	California Gold Rush	Stunt performer
1946	Badman's Territory	Stunt performer
1946	Smoky	Stunt performer
1946	Out California Way	Stunt double: Monte Hale
1947	Wyoming	Stunt performer
1947	Angel and the Badman	Stunt performer
1947	Ramrod	Stunt performer
1948	The Gallant Legion	Stunt performer
1948	Fort Apache	Stunt double: Henry Fonda
1948	3 Godfathers	Stunt performer
1948	Red River	Stunt performer

=== Television ===
Year	Title	Role	Notes
1956	Cavalcade of America	Cal Bennett	Episode: "Once a Hero"
1958	The Adventures of Ozzie and Harriet	Tex Barton	Episode: "Top Gun"
1958	Navy Log	Border Patrol Officer	Episode: "Florida Weekend"
1958	The Restless Gun	Sheriff Tim Malachy	Episode: "No Way to Kill"
1958	Alfred Hitchcock Presents	Sheriff Jeff	Episode: "And the Desert Shall Blossom"
1958	Wagon Train	Wagon Driver	Episode: "Bije Wilcox Story"
1959	Border Patrol	Hank Colman	Episode: "Everglades Story"
1960–61	Laramie	Various	3 episodes
1961–62	Route 66	Various	2 episodes
1960–62	Have Gun – Will Travel	Various	3 episodes
1962	Stoney Burke	Rex Donally	Episode: "Point of Honor"
1962	Bonanza	Deputy Sheriff Stan Mace	Episode: "The Gamble"
1963–71	Gunsmoke	Various roles	3 episodes
1964	Perry Mason	Kelly	Episode: "The Case of the Reckless Rockhound"
1965	Bob Hope Presents the Chrysler Theatre	Burt Wade	Episode: "March from Camp Tyler"
1966	Branded	Bill Latigo	Episode: "McCord's Way"
1966	ABC Stage 67	Sheriff Barbee	Episode: "Noon Wine"
1966–67	The Monroes	Sleeve	Recurring role
1963–68	The Virginian	Various	4 episodes
1969	Walt Disney's Wonderful World of Color	Will Parker	Episodes: "Ride a Northbound Horse: Part 1 and 2"
1969	Bonanza	Sergeant Samuel Bellis	Episode: "The Deserter"
1971	Bonanza	Kelly James	Episode: "Top Hand"
1973	The Red Pony	Jess Taylor	Television movie
1973	Runaway!	Holly Gibson	Television movie
1973	Blood Sport	Dwayne Birdsong	Television movie
1974	Locusts	Amos Fletcher	Television movie
1976	The Savage Bees	Sheriff Donald McKew	Television movie
1979	The Sacketts	Cap Rountree	Television movie
1980	Wild Times	Doc Bogardus	Miniseries
1982	The Shadow Riders	Uncle 'Black Jack' Traven	Television movie
1984	Hollywood Greats	Himself	Episode: "John Wayne"
1985	Wild Horses	Bill Ward	Television movie
1986	Dream West	Jim Bridger	Miniseries
1988	Stranger on My Land	Vern Whitman	Television movie
1991	The Chase	Laurienti	Television movie
1991	Thank Ya, Thank Ya Kindly	Himself	Documentary
1993	Bonanza: The Return	Bronc Evans	Television movie
1993	John Ford	Himself	Documentary
1994	100 Years of the Hollywood Western	Himself	Documentary
1995	Bonanza: Under Attack	Bronc Evans	Television movie
1996	Ruby Jean and Joe	Big Man	Television movie

== Awards and nominations ==
Institution	Year	Category	Work	Result
Academy Awards	1972	Best Supporting Actor	The Last Picture Show	Won
British Academy Film Awards	1973	Best Actor in a Supporting Role	The Last Picture Show	Won
Golden Globe Awards	1972	Best Supporting Actor – Motion Picture	The Last Picture Show	Won
National Board of Review	1971	Best Supporting Actor	The Last Picture Show	Won
National Society of Film Critics	1972	Best Supporting Actor	The Last Picture Show	Nominated
New York Film Critics Circle	1971	Best Supporting Actor	The Last Picture Show	Won
Taos Talking Pictures Film Festival	1996	Maverick Award	—N/a	Won
Western Heritage Awards	1976	Theatrical Motion Picture	Bite the Bullet	Won
Western Heritage Awards	1992	Excellence in a Television Presentation	Legends of the American West	Won
