= She Wore a Yellow Ribbon =

1949 film by John Ford

- Theatrical release poster
- Directed by: John Ford
- Screenplay by: Frank S. Nugent; Laurence Stallings
- Based on: The Big Hunt; 1947 story in The Saturday Evening Post; War Party; 1948 story in The Saturday Evening Post by James Warner Bellah
- Produced by: Argosy Pictures
- Starring: John Wayne; Joanne Dru; John Agar; Ben Johnson; Harry Carey Jr.; Victor McLaglen; Mildred Natwick; George O'Brien; Arthur Shields
- Narrated by: Irving Pichel
- Cinematography: Winton C. Hoch
- Edited by: Jack Murray
- Music by: Richard Hageman
- Color process: Technicolor
- Production company: Argosy Pictures
- Distributed by: RKO Radio Pictures
- Release dates: July 26, 1949 (Premiere-Kansas City, KS); October 22, 1949 (US)
- Running time: 103 minutes
- Country: United States
- Language: English
- Budget: $1.6 million
- Box office: $2.7 million (rentals)

She Wore a Yellow Ribbon is a 1949 American Western film directed by John Ford and starring John Wayne, with Joanne Dru, John Agar, Ben Johnson, and Harry Carey Jr in supporting roles. It is the second film in Ford's "Cavalry Trilogy", along with Fort Apache (1948) and Rio Grande (1950). With a budget of $1.6 million, the film was one of the most expensive Westerns made up to that time. A major hit for RKO, it received its name from "She Wore a Yellow Ribbon", a song popular with the U.S. military.

Written by Frank Nugent and Laurence Stallings, the film was shot in Technicolor on location in Monument Valley using large areas of the Navajo reservation along the Arizona-Utah state border. Ford and cinematographer Winton C. Hoch based much of the film's imagery on the paintings and sculptures of Frederic Remington. Hoch won the Best Cinematography Award (Color) at the 22nd Academy Awards.

== Plot ==
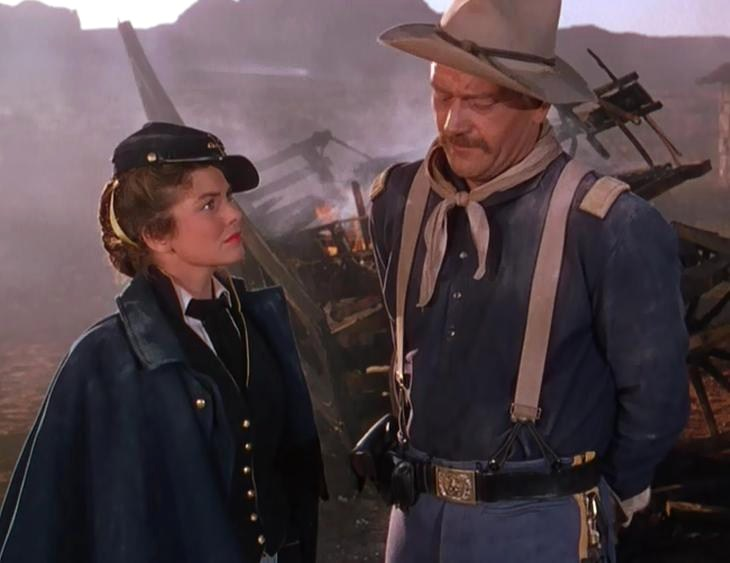
Joanne Dru as Olivia and John Wayne as Captain Nathan Brittles

In August 1876, aging veteran Captain Nathan Brittles enjoys his quiet routines and pending retirement from the 2nd U.S. Cavalry after 40 years of military service. All is placid at Fort Starke, a small frontier Army post, and Brittles is honored to receive a parting gift from his men of a sterling silver pocket watch he must sheepishly don spectacles to inspect. He is touched by the warm sentiment engraved on the back.

A spirited rivalry erupts between troop officers 1st Lieutenant Flint Cohill and Second Lieutenant Ross Pennell. They vie for the affections of Olivia Dandridge, the commanding officer's flirtatious niece. Their frequent breaches of cavalry protocol and officer decorum provide Captain Brittles with ample opportunity to sternly mentor the men, making it apparent the need for his experienced leadership.

All tranquility vanishes when news of a breakout by the Cheyenne and Arapaho from their reservation following the Sioux massacre of George Armstrong Custer's force at the Battle of the Little Big Horn reaches the post. Brittles is tasked with forcing them back, potentially setting off a new Indian war there. This effort is complicated by an order to first deliver his commanding officer's wife, Abby Allshard, and Olivia, to the safety of an eastbound stage. Assisting Brittles is the green West Pointer Second Lieutenant Ross Pennell and his second-in-command, a veteran of 9 years on the frontier, First Lieutenant Flint Cohill; his chief scout, Sergeant Tyree, formerly a Confederate captain of cavalry; and Union veterans First Sergeant Quincannon, his trusted troop sergeant, and Major Allshard, his long-time friend and commanding officer.

Things do not go as planned; the Indians are not contained. The column is forced to make detours to avoid hostiles, and when they finally arrive at the Sudro's Wells stagecoach station, they find it burned to the ground by Indian raiders. The women do not make their stage and must remain at the fort, potentially in grave danger.

On the return trip to the post, Brittles witnesses Mr. Rinders the Indian agent illegally and unscrupulously trying to sell repeating rifles to the Indians. Rinders is killed by the Cheyenne, and the rifles taken.

After these setbacks, Brittles returns with the troop to Fort Starke to retire. His subordinates continue the mission in the field, with Lieutenant Cohill now in command. Unwilling to see more lives needlessly lost, Brittles takes it upon himself, in the last hours of his active service, to try to make peace with the tribes through his old friend, Chief Pony That Walks. When that fails, he devises a risky stratagem to avoid a bloody war. With just minutes left on his pocket watch before his retirement officially begins, he orders his lieutenants to stampede the Indian ponies through the Indian encampment at night. Deprived of their mounts, the renegades have no recourse but to return to their reservation on foot, trailed at a discreet distance by Cohill's cavalry.

Now officially retired, Brittles sets off westward. Before he gets too far away, though, Brittles is recalled to active duty with an appointment as Chief of Scouts. His rank is that of lieutenant colonel – a U.S. War Department order endorsed, he is pleased to read aloud, by Generals Phil Sheridan and William Tecumseh Sherman, and President Ulysses S. Grant.

Returning to fort, he is greeted by an appreciative post community at a reception in which all the women wear yellow ribbons in their hair. Olivia and Flint Cohill inform Brittles that they have become engaged, to which Brittles replies, in his gruff way, that everyone at the post knew very well that that would happen. The final scene is an inspiring speech by the narrator about the anonymous, hard-working, courageous soldiers of the United States Cavalry.

== Cast ==
- John Wayne as Captain Nathan Brittles
- Joanne Dru as Olivia Dandridge
- John Agar as Lieutenant Flint Cohill
- Ben Johnson as Sergeant Tyree
- Harry Carey Jr. as Second Lieutenant Ross Pennell
- Victor McLaglen as First Sergeant Quincannon
- Mildred Natwick as Mrs. Abby Allshard
- George O'Brien as Major Mack Allshard
- Arthur Shields as Dr. O'Laughlin
- Michael Dugan as Sergeant Hochbauer
- Chief John Big Tree as Pony That Walks
- Fred Graham as Sergeant Hench
- George Sky Eagle as Chief Sky Eagle
- Tom Tyler as Corporal Quayne
- Noble Johnson as Red Shirt

== Production ==
=== Casting ===
Director Ford initially was uncertain whom to cast in the lead role, but he knew that he did not want John Wayne for the part—considering, among other factors, that Wayne would be playing a character over 20 years older than he was at the time. Reportedly, Wayne's 1948 performance in Red River changed Ford's mind, causing him to exclaim, "I didn't know the big son of a bitch could act!" Ford realized Wayne had grown considerably as an actor and was then capable of playing the character he envisioned for this film. When shooting was completed, Ford presented Wayne with a cake with the message, "You're an actor now". The role also became one of Wayne's favorite performances. Wayne himself felt that his Academy Award nomination for Best Actor of 1949 for Sands of Iwo Jima should have been for She Wore a Yellow Ribbon, instead.

Director John Ford's older brother Francis appears in a single brief scene as Connolly, the barman; Ford kept him on wages "for eight weeks, even through Francis could have completed his scenes in less than a week". Character actor Paul Fix (Harry Carey Jr.'s father-in-law) also appears in a small, uncredited role.

=== Filming ===
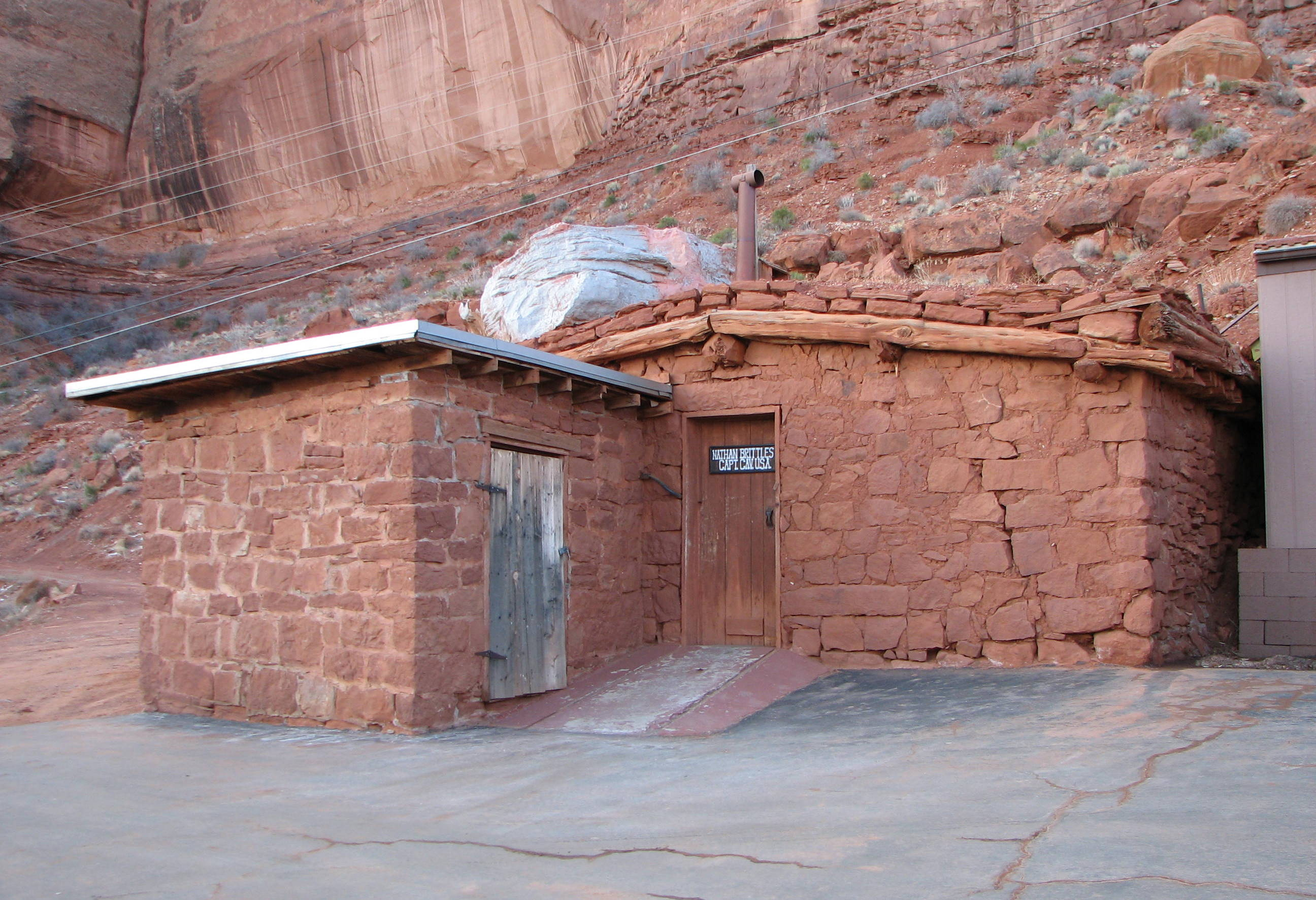
The Post Headquarters building, where Captain Brittles is quartered in the film, is located at Goulding's Trading Post near Monument Valley.

The cast and crew lived in relatively primitive conditions in Monument Valley. Most slept in dirt-floor cabins that only had communal cold-water drum showers. The film was completed ahead of schedule and under budget.

Although the film's cinematographer, Winton Hoch, won an Academy Award for his work, filming was not a smooth creative process because of conflicts with Ford. Ironically, one of the most iconic scenes from the film was created during a dispute. As a line of cavalry rode through the desert, a real thunderstorm grew on the horizon. Hoch began to pack up the cameras as the weather worsened, only for Ford to order him to keep shooting. Hoch argued that not enough natural light was available for the scene, and more importantly, the cameras could become potential lightning rods if the storm swept over them. Ford ignored Hoch's complaints, completing the scene as the thunderstorm rolled in, soaking the cast and crew. Hoch later had filed a letter of complaint against Ford with the American Society of Cinematographers over the filming of this scene.

The story of Hoch's refusal to shoot in this thunderstorm has often been repeated, but actor Harry Carey Jr., who was on the set, contests it. He says Ford had finished shooting for the day, but when the picturesque storm brewed, he asked Hoch if they could shoot in the declining light. Hoch answered, "It's awfully dark, Jack. I'll shoot it. I just can't promise anything". Ford then instructed, "Winnie, open her up [the camera lens] and let's go for it. If it doesn't turn out, I'll take the rap". Winnie complied, saying, "Fair enough, Jack".

This was the second John Ford movie filmed in Technicolor, after Drums Along the Mohawk (1939).

== Critical response ==
In 2025, The Hollywood Reporter listed She Wore a Yellow Ribbon as having the best stunts of 1949.

== Adaptations ==
An unsuccessful television pilot was written in 1958 by James Warner Bellah, titled Command, and starred Everett Sloane as Captain Brittles and Ben Cooper as Lieutenant Cohill.

== Awards ==
She Wore a Yellow Ribbon earned the 1950 Academy Award for Best Cinematography (Color) for Winton C. Hoch.

The film was also nominated for Best Written Western at the 2nd Writers Guild of America Awards.
