= Red River (1948 film) =

Film by Howard Hawks

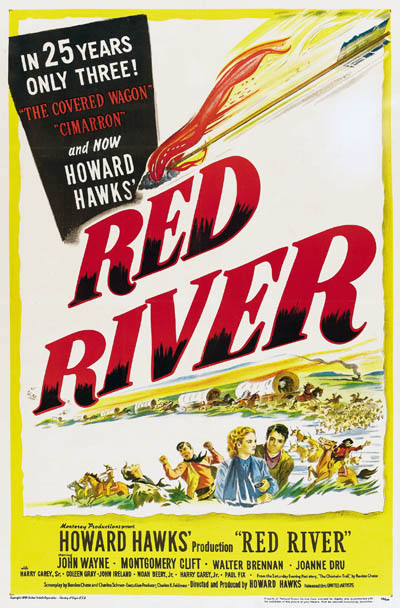
- Theatrical release poster
- Directed by: Howard Hawks
- Screenplay by: Borden Chase; Charles Schnee
- Based on: The Chisholm Trail; 1946 The Saturday Evening Post by Borden Chase
- Produced by: Howard Hawks
- Starring: John Wayne; Montgomery Clift; Walter Brennan; Joanne Dru; Harry Carey Sr.; Coleen Gray; John Ireland; Noah Beery Jr.; Harry Carey Jr.; Paul Fix
- Cinematography: Russell Harlan
- Edited by: Christian Nyby
- Music by: Dimitri Tiomkin
- Production company: Monterey Productions
- Distributed by: United Artists
- Release date: August 26, 1948
- Running time: 133 minutes (Pre-release) 127 minutes (Theatrical)
- Country: United States
- Language: English
- Budget: $2.7 million
- Box office: $4,506,825 (U.S. and Canada rentals)

Red River is a 1948 American Western film, directed and produced by Howard Hawks and starring John Wayne and Montgomery Clift. It gives a fictional account of the first cattle drive from Texas to Kansas along the Chisholm Trail. The dramatic tension stems from a growing feud over the management of the drive between the Texas rancher who initiated it (Wayne) and his adopted adult son (Clift).

The film's supporting cast features: Walter Brennan, Joanne Dru, Coleen Gray, Harry Carey, John Ireland, Hank Worden, Noah Beery Jr., Harry Carey Jr. and Paul Fix. The screenplay by Borden Chase and Charles Schnee was based on a story by Chase which had been serialized in The Saturday Evening Post in 1946 as "Blazing Guns on the Chisholm Trail".

Upon its release, Red River was both a critical and commercial success, and was nominated for two Academy Awards in the categories of Motion Picture Story and Film Editing. In 1990, Red River was selected for preservation in the United States National Film Registry by the Library of Congress as being "culturally, historically, or aesthetically significant." Red River was selected by the American Film Institute as the fifth-greatest Western of all time in the AFI's 10 Top 10 list in 2008.

== Plot ==
In 1851, Thomas Dunson departs a California Trail-bound wagon train with his long-time friend Nadine Groot north of Texas, intending to head south and establish his own cattle ranch in the state. Gifting his mother's bracelet, he tells his gal Fen to stay until he sends for her. Later, they spot smoke from the wagon train, and kill a few Comanche raiders; Dunson recovers the bracelet from one of them. He takes the caravan's sole survivor, teenager Matt Garth, across the Red River into Texas, settling near the Rio Grande. He creates his "Red River D" brand, and promises to add "M" to the brand when Matt earns it.

Fourteen years later, Dunson's once successful ranch is near bankruptcy due to the Civil War. He opts to drive his 10,000 head 1,000 miles (1,600 km) to the Sedalia, Missouri, railhead for the best price. Professional gunman Cherry Valance joins the drive, suggesting the railroad in Abilene, Kansas, is much closer. Learning that Valance only heard about Abilene's railhead secondhand, Dunson insists on heading towards Missouri.

Drover Bunk Kenneally accidentally causes a stampede when stealing chuckwagon sugar, killing drover Dan Latimer and widowing his wife. Dunson tries bullwhipping Kenneally, who draws his gun; but Matt is faster, wounding Kenneally. Valance calls Matt soft for not killing him. Dunson's stubborn and harsh ways gradually alienate the cowhands. He remains set on Missouri despite news of a devastating raid on an earlier drive at the Ouachitas, and kills three men who intend to leave.

After fording the Red River, he threatens to hang two more deserters. Matt, who has been following Dunson's orders with increasing reluctance, rebels against him. Supported by all the cowhands, Matt usurps command of the drive and heads for Abilene on the Chisholm Trail, leaving a wounded Dunson behind. Dunson allows Groot to leave, and tells Matt that he will catch up and kill him.

Matt and the drovers save a wagon train of gamblers and dance hall girls from an Indian attack. Tess Millay, a woman from the wagon train, takes an interest in Matt, but Matt is forced to leave her behind when worsening weather compels him to ford a river early. Eight days later, Dunson arrives with hired guns and is confronted by Tess. Dunsen is surprised that she knows his name and wears his mother's bracelet. He explains he wanted a son and Matt would have inherited his ranch, but not after he took his herd. Dunson offers Tess half the ranch if she will bear him a son. She agrees on the condition he stops pursuing Matt. Since he will not, she demands to accompany him.

Matt reaches Abilene, finding the whole town has waited a long time to buy a herd the size of his. He accepts an offer and finds Tess in his hotel room. The next morning Dunson arrives and is challenged by Valance; both shoot, wounding each other. Dunson confronts Matt, who refuses to draw even while Dunson fires, grazing Matt's cheek. Dunson throws his and Matt's guns away, and punches Matt, who does not fight back until finally he does, knocking Dunson into a cart. Tess interrupts, forcing them to make peace at gunpoint.

Impressed, Dunson advises Matt to marry Tess. Matt complains that Dunson keeps telling people what to do. Dunson then tells him that on their return to the ranch they will add an "M" to the Red River D brand, stating that Matt has earned it.

== Cast ==
- John Wayne as Thomas Dunson
- Montgomery Clift as Matthew "Matt" Garth
- Joanne Dru as Tess Millay
- Walter Brennan as Nadine Groot
- Coleen Gray as Fen
- Harry Carey as Mr. Melville, representative of the Greenwood Trading Company
- John Ireland as Cherry Valance
- Noah Beery Jr. as Buster McGee, Dunson wrangler
- Harry Carey Jr. as Dan Latimer, Dunson wrangler
- Chief Yowlachie as Two Jaw Quo, Groot's second cook
- Paul Fix as Teeler Yacey, Dunson wrangler
- Hank Worden as Sims Reeves, Dunson wrangler
- Mickey Kuhn as Young Matt
- Ray Hyke as Walt Jergens, Dunson wrangler
- Hal Talliaferro as Old Leather, Dunson wrangler

=== Uncredited ===
- Shelley Winters as Dance Hall Girl in Wagon Train
- Dan White as Laredo, Dunson wrangler
- Tom Tyler as a Dunson wrangler who quits
- Glenn Strange as Naylor, Dunson wrangler
- Chief Sky Eagle as Indian Chief
- William Self as Sutter, a wounded wrangler
- Pierce Lyden as Campbell, the Colonel's scout
- Harry Cording as Gambler
- George Lloyd as Rider with Melville
- John Merton as Settler
- Richard Farnsworth as Dunston rider
- Lane Chandler as Colonel

== Production ==
Red River trailer

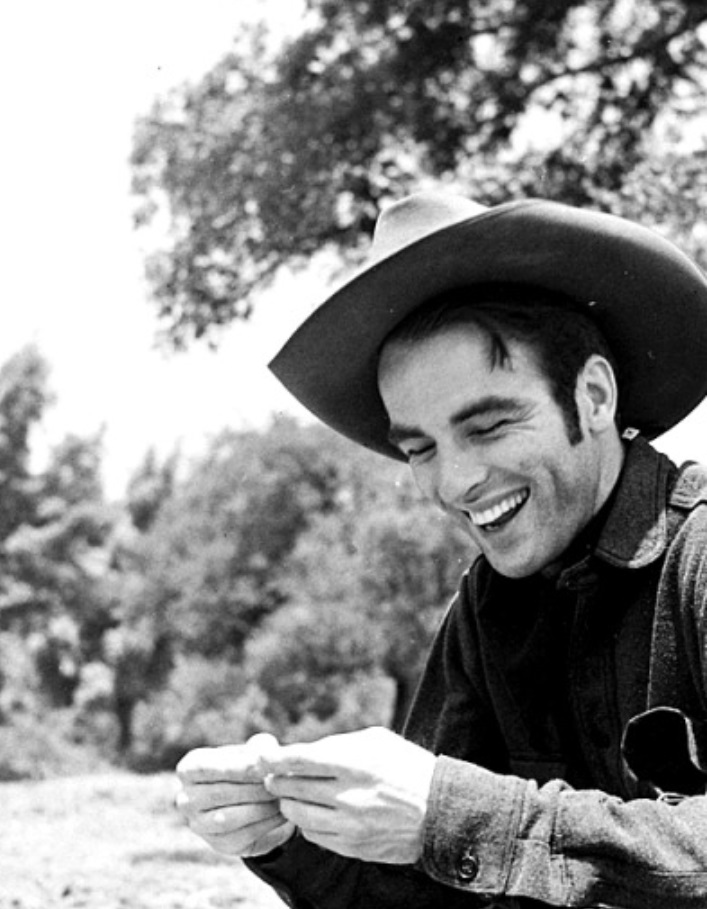
Montgomery Clift between filming

Red River was filmed in 1946, copyrighted in 1947, and widely released on September 17, 1948. Footage from Red River was later incorporated into the opening montage of Wayne's last film, The Shootist, to illustrate the backstory of Wayne's character. The film was nominated for Academy Awards for Best Film Editing (Christian Nyby) and Best Writing, Motion Picture Story (Borden Chase). John Ford, who worked with Wayne on many films such as Stagecoach, and later The Searchers and The Man Who Shot Liberty Valance, reportedly said of Wayne's performance in Red River that "I didn't know the big son of a bitch could act!"

Hawks felt Dru's final speech after Dunson and Matt fight didn't work, wishing his original choice to play Tess Margaret Sheridan had been available. He felt Sheridan could have done a far better job of delivering the lines than Dru did.

The film was shot in black and white rather than color, because director Howard Hawks found Technicolor technology to be too "garish" for the realistic style desired. But as with many remembrances of Hawks, he has also said the exact opposite to Peter Bogdanovich, to whom he claimed that he wished he had shot the picture in color, especially the sequence involving driving the cattle across the Red River. Had he done so, he thought it would have made a lot more money. Second unit director Arthur Rosson was given credit in the opening title crawl as co-director. He shot parts of the cattle drive and some action sequences. The film's ending differed from that of the original story. In Chase's original Saturday Evening Post story, published in 1946 as "Blazing Guns on the Chisholm Trail", Valance shoots Dunson dead in Abilene and Matt takes his body back to Texas to be buried on the ranch.

=== Alternate versions ===
During the production and while the film was still being shot, Hawks was not satisfied with the editing and asked Christian Nyby to take over cutting duties. Nyby worked for about a year on the project. After production, the pre-release version was 133 minutes and included book-style transitions. This version was briefly available for television in the 1970s, but was believed to be lost. It was rediscovered after a long search as a Cinémathèque Française 35 mm print, and released by the Criterion Collection.

Before the film could be released, Howard Hughes sued Hawks, claiming that the climactic scene between Dunson and Matt was too similar to the film The Outlaw (1943), which both Hawks and Hughes had worked on. Hughes prepared a new 127-minute cut, which replaced the book inserts with spoken narration by Walter Brennan. Nyby salvaged the film by editing in some reaction shots, which resulted in the original theatrical version. This version was lost, and the 133-minute pre-release version was seen on television broadcasts and home video releases. The original theatrical cut was reassembled by Janus Films (in co-operation with UA parent company MGM) for their Criterion Collection Blu-ray/DVD release on May 27, 2014.

Film historian Peter Bogdanovich interviewed Hawks in 1972, and he was led to believe that the narrated theatrical version was the director's preferred cut. This view was upheld by Geoffrey O'Brien in his 2014 essay for the Criterion release. Contrarily, some, including film historian Gerald Mast, argue that Hawks preferred the 133-minute version. Mast points out that this is told from an objective third-person point of view, while the shorter cut has Brennan's character narrating scenes he could not have witnessed. Filmmaker/historian Michael Schlesinger, in his essay on the film for the Library of Congress' National Film Registry, argues that when Bogdanovich interviewed Hawks, the director "was 76 and in declining health", when he was prone to telling tall tales. Schlesinger also points out that Hughes's shortened version was prepared for overseas distribution because it is easier to replace narration than printed text.

== Soundtrack ==
The song "Settle Down", by musician Dimitri Tiomkin and lyricist Frederick Herbert, was heard over the credits and at various places throughout the film score. It was later adapted by Tiomkin with a new lyric by Paul Francis Webster as "My Rifle, My Pony, and Me" in the 1959 film Rio Bravo for an onscreen duet by Dean Martin and Ricky Nelson as John Wayne and Walter Brennan look on.

== Reception ==
Bosley Crowther of The New York Times gave the film a mostly positive review, praising the main cast for "several fine performances" and Hawks' direction for "credible substance and detail." He only found a "big let-down" in the Indian wagon train attack scene, lamenting that the film had "run smack into 'Hollywood' in the form of a glamorized female, played by Joanne Dru." Variety called it "a spectacle of sweeping grandeur" with "a first rate script," adding, "John Wayne has his best assignment to date and he makes the most of it." John McCarten of The New Yorker found the film "full of fine Western shots," with the main cast's performances "all first-rate." Harrison's Reports called the film "an epic of such sweep and magnitude that it deserves to take its place as one of the finest pictures of its type ever to come out of Hollywood." Roger Ebert added the film to his Great Movies list, calling it "one of the greatest of all westerns".

On review aggregator Rotten Tomatoes the film holds an approval rating of 100% rating, based on 29 reviews, with an average rating of 9.0/10.

This movie was the last movie shown in the 1971 Peter Bogdanovich motion picture, The Last Picture Show.

In 1990, Red River was deemed "culturally, historically, or aesthetically significant" by the Library of Congress and was selected for preservation in the National Film Registry.

Red River was selected by the American Film Institute as the 5th greatest Western of all time in the AFI's 10 Top 10 list in 2008.

In 2025, The Hollywood Reporter listed Red River as having the best stunts of 1948.

== "Red River D" belt buckles ==
To commemorate their work on the film, director Howard Hawks had special Western belt buckles made up for certain members of the cast and crew of Red River. The solid silver belt buckles had a twisted silver wire rope edge, the Dunson brand in gold in the center, the words "Red River" in gold wire in the upper left and lower right corners, the initials of the recipients in the lower left corner, and the date "1946" in cut gold numerals in the upper right corner. Hawks gave full-sized (men's) buckles to John Wayne, his son David Hawks, Montgomery Clift, Walter Brennan, assistant director Arthur Rosson, cinematographer Russell Harlan, and John Ireland. Joanna Dru and Hawks' daughter Barbara were given smaller (ladies') versions of the buckle. According to David Hawks, other men's and women's buckles were distributed, but he can only confirm the family members and members of the cast and production team listed above received Red River D buckles.

Wayne and Hawks exchanged buckles as a token of their mutual respect. Wayne wore the Red River D belt buckle with the initials "HWH" in nine other movies: Rio Bravo (1959), North to Alaska (1960), Hatari! (1962), McLintock! (1963), Circus World (1964), The Sons of Katie Elder (1965), El Dorado (1966), The War Wagon (1967) and Rio Lobo (1970). The actor did this even when he wasn't filming under the direction of Howard Hawks, with one known exception: Apparently John Wayne didn't wear the Red River belt buckle in films directed by John Ford.

In 1981, John Wayne's son, Michael, sent the buckle to a silversmith, in order to have duplicates made for all of Wayne's children. While in the silversmith's care, it was stolen and has not been seen since. Red River D buckles, made by a number of sources, are among the most popular and sought after icons of John Wayne fans.

== See also ==
- Cimarron – 1931 film mentioned on poster
- The Covered Wagon – 1923 film mentioned on poster
- The Last Picture Show
