= Bonne Mère =

Bonne Mère is French for "good mother"

Bonne Mère, La Bonne Mère, Les Bonnes Mères, may refer to:

== People and characters ==
- La Bonne Mère (French: The Good Mother), a nickname given to Mary, mother of Jesus
- Henriette Aymer de La Chevalerie (1767–1834), a French catholic nun, nicknamed "la bonne mère" (French: the good mother)
- Marie-Thérèse Charlotte de Lamourous (1754–1836), a French laywoman of the underground Catholic Church during the French Revolution, nicknamed "bonne mère" (French: good mother)
- La bonne mère (French: the good mother), a fictional character from the 1938 French drama film Ramuntcho (1938 film)

== Places ==
- Notre-Dame de la Garde (French: Our Lady of the Guard), Marseille, France; a church also called "la Bonne Mère" (French: the Good Mother)

== Arts, entertainment, media ==
- Good Mother (film) (French: Bonne Mère), a 2021 French drama film
- Bonne mère (French: Good Mother), a 2008 short film by Damon D'Oliveira
- Bonne Mère (French: Good Mother), a 1926 artwork by Ary Bitter
- La Bonne Mère, contenant de petites pièces dramatiques, a 1786 book by Jean Baptiste Perrin (fl. 1786)
- La Bonne Mère (French: The Good Mother), a 1867 sculpture of the Virgin and Child by Eugène-Louis Lequesne
- La Bonne Mère (French: The Good Mother), a 1765 painting by Jean-Baptiste Greuze
- La Bonne mère (French: The Good Mother), a 1906 painting by Paul Signac; see List of paintings by Paul Signac

== Ships ==
- Bonne Mère (French: Good Mother), a Royal French ship lost in 1789; see List of shipwrecks in 1789
- Bonne-Mère (French: Good-Mother), a Revolutionary French brig warship involved in the Action of 31 May 1796 during the Revolutionary French Wars
- Bonne Mère (French: Good Mother), a French merchantman ship sunk in 1823; see List of shipwrecks in February 1823
- Bonne Mère (French: Good Mother), a French ship grounded in 1826; see List of shipwrecks in February 1826
- La Bonne Mère (French: The Good Mother), a French brig ship wrecked in 1841; see List of shipwrecks in October 1841
- Bonne Mère (French: Good Mother), a French ship that burned down in 1850; see List of shipwrecks in October 1850
- Bonne Mère (French: Good Mother), a French ship beached in 1857; see List of shipwrecks in September 1857
- Bonne Mère (French: Good Mother), a British ship burned down in 1862; see List of shipwrecks in January 1862
- Bonne Mère (French: Good Mother), a French brig ship wrecked in 1869; see List of shipwrecks in September 1869

== Other uses ==
- Bonne Mère (French: Good Mother), a horse; a mare that was studded with Phaéton (trotter horse)

== See also ==
- Bonnes Mares, a red wine from France
- Good Mother (disambiguation) (French: la bonne mère)
- Bonne (disambiguation)
- Mere (disambiguation)
