= Good Father =

Goodfather or Good Father or variation, may refer to:

== People ==
- a father who is good

=== Persons ===
- The Goodfather, (born 1961, as Charles Wright), American professional wrestler
- Peter Coudrin (1768–1837; born Pierre Coudrin; nicknamed "The Good Father") Roman Catholic missionary
- Jean-Marie-Rodrigue Villeneuve (1883–1947; nicknamed "Good Father") Roman Catholic cardinal

== Other uses ==
- The Good Father (novel), a novel by Peter Prince
- The Good Father (film), a 1985 UK film
- "The Good Father", a nickname of "Episode 1" (Life on Mars, series 1)
- Good Father Bar, a fictional bar from the TV sitcom Come Home Love: Lo and Behold
- "Good Father" (song), a 2012 single by Vybz Kartel

== See also ==
- Good Father (Chibcha: Pacho), a town in Cundinamarca, Columbia
- The Good Father (French: Le Bon Père), an 18th-century stage comedy
- Good Father (Latin: Abbà Pater), a 1999 devotional album by Pope John Paul II
- "Good Good Father" (song), a 2015 single by Chris Tomlin off his 2016 album Never Lose Sight
- The Good Mother (disambiguation)
- Good (disambiguation)
- Father (disambiguation)
- Godfather (disambiguation)
