= Good Mother =

The Good Mother or goodmother or variant, may refer to:

== Film ==
- The Good Mother (1988 film), an American film, based on a novel by Sue Miller
- The Good Mother (2023 film), an American crime thriller film
- Good Mother (film), a 2021 French drama film
- Glass House: The Good Mother, a 2006 film
- "A Good Mother", a 2020 film nominated for the 2021 41st Blue Dragon Film Awards

== Other uses ==
- "Good Mother", a 1994 song by Jann Arden in the album Living Under June
- The Good Mothers, a 2023 British-Italian TV series
- "The Good Mother", a 2013 episode of the TV series The First 48: Missing Persons
- Mary, mother of Jesus; also having many nicknames, including "The Good Mother"

== See also ==
- "Good Wife, Wise Mother" aka "Wise Wife, Good Mother", a phrase representing a traditional ideal for womanhood in East Asia
- The Good Bad Mother, a 2023 Korean TV series
- The School for Good Mothers, a 2022 novel by Jessamine Chan
- "I Had a Good Mother and Father", a 1929 gospel blues song
- The Good Mother-in-Law (1993-1995), a Greek-language TV show on ANT1; see List of programs broadcast by ANT1
- Godmother (disambiguation)
- Goodfather (disambiguation)
- Bonne Mère (disambiguation); (French: good mother)
- Buenamadre (Spanish: Goodmother), Salmanca, Spain; a village
