= List of shipwrecks in February 1826 =

The list of shipwrecks in February 1826 includes some ships sunk, wrecked or otherwise lost during February 1826.

== 1 February ==
List of shipwrecks: 1 February 1826
Ship	State	Description
Duchess of York	United Kingdom	The transport ship was wrecked on the north coast of Guadeloupe. All on board were rescued.

== 2 February ==
List of shipwrecks: 2 February 1826
Ship	State	Description
Argo	United Kingdom	The ship was driven ashore and wrecked on the Burrow of Ballateigue. Her crew were rescued. She was on a voyage from Alicante, Spain to Belfast, County Antrim.
Hercule	France	The ship was driven ashore at Gonaïves, Haiti. She was on a voyage from Port-au-Prince, Haiti to Havre de Grâce, Seine-Inférieure. She was later refloated and returned to Port-au-Prince for repairs.
Hinchinbrook Packet	United Kingdom	The ship was wrecked off Alderney, Channel Islands. All on board were rescued. She was on a voyage from Weymouth, Dorset, to Guernsey, Channel Islands.
Jupiter	France	The ship was in collision with Louise (France) and foundered. She was on a voyage from Cette, Hérault to Havre de Grâce, Seine-Inférieure.

== 3 February ==
List of shipwrecks: 3 February 1826
Ship	State	Description
Albion	United Kingdom	The ship was driven ashore and wrecked at Holyhead, Anglesey. Her crew were rescued. She was on a voyage from Saint John, New Brunswick, British North America to Liverpool, Lancashire.
Somers	United States	The ship was wrecked on the York Ledges, in the Atlantic Ocean off the coast of Massachusetts. Her crew were rescued. she was on a voyage from Saint Petersburg, Russia to Boston, Massachusetts.

== 4 February ==
List of shipwrecks: 4 February 1826
Ship	State	Description
Hero	United Kingdom	The ship was driven ashore and sank at Youghall, County Cork. She was on a voyage from Youghall to Glasgow, Renfrewshire.

== 5 February ==
List of shipwrecks: 5 February 1826
Ship	State	Description
Deborah	United Kingdom	The ship was driven ashore in Castletown Bay, Isle of Man. She was on a voyage from Dublin to Whitehaven, Cumberland.
Helena	United Kingdom	The ship ran aground and sank on the Whiting Sand, in the North Sea off the coast of Essex. Her crew were rescued. She was on a voyage from North Shields, County Durham, to London.
Ophelia	United Kingdom	The ship ran aground and sank on the Whiting Sand. Her crew were rescued, She was on a voyage from Sunderland, County Durham, to London.

== 6 February ==
List of shipwrecks: 6 February 1826
Ship	State	Description
Alert	United Kingdom	The ship was wrecked in Holyhead Bay. Her crew were rescued. She was on a voyage from Liverpool, Lancashire, to Sandwich, Kent.
Emelia	Sweden	The brig was wrecked at Wexford, United Kingdom, with the loss of two of her crew. She was on a voyage from Alicante, Spain to Belfast, County Antrim, United Kingdom.
Fame	United Kingdom	The ship was wrecked on the North Bull, in the Irish Sea off the coast of County Dublin.
Ida	Sweden	The ship was wrecked off Penzance, Cornwall, United Kingdom with the loss of all but two of her crew. She was on a voyage from Messina, Sicily to Stockholm.
Laura	United Kingdom	The ship was in collision with Salacia (United Kingdom) and foundered in the North Sea off Huntclif Foot, Yorkshire. Her crew were rescued by Salacia.
Paragon	United Kingdom	The ship was driven ashore at Demerara. She was refloated on 21 February.

== 7 February ==
List of shipwrecks: 7 February 1826
Ship	State	Description
Commodore Hayes	British East India Company	The East Indiaman was destroyed by fire at Calcutta, India.
Diana	United Kingdom	The ship was wrecked on the South Haaks sandbank, in the North Sea off the coast of Texel, North Holland, Netherlands. Her crew were rescued.
Governor Elliot	(United Kingdom of Great Britain and Ireland) Antigua	The drogher was wrecked off Belfast, Antigua.
Maid of Selma	United Kingdom	The ship was wrecked on Mew Island, County Down. She was on a voyage from Dundrum, County Dublin to Belfast, County Antrim .
Nassau	(United Kingdom of Great Britain and Ireland) New South Wales	The brig was driven ashore and wrecked on Tristan da Cunha.

== 8 February ==
List of shipwrecks: 8 February 1826
Ship	State	Description
Jane	United Kingdom	The ship was wrecked at Stornoway, Isle of Lewis with the loss of all but her captain. She was on a voyage from Stornoway to Wick, Caithness.

== 10 February ==
List of shipwrecks: 10 February 1826
Ship	State	Description
Hopewell	United Kingdom	The ship was abandoned in the Atlantic Ocean (47°11′N 23°30′W). Her eighteen crew were rescued by Robert McWilliam (United States. She was on a voyage from Halifax, Nova Scotia, British North America to Londonderry. Hopewell was discovered on 7 March and towed in to Castletown Bay, County Cork.
Superior	United Kingdom	The ship was driven ashore and damaged between Blyth, Northumberland and Seaton Sluice, County Durham. She was on a voyage from Riga, Russia to London. Superior was refloated and taken in to Blyth.

== 11 February ==
List of shipwrecks: 11 February 1826
Ship	State	Description
Ophelia	United Kingdom	The ship was wrecked on the Kish Bank, in the Irish Sea with the loss of two of her fourteen crew. She was on a voyage from Liverpool, Lancashire, to Savannah, Georgia, United States.

== 12 February ==
List of shipwrecks: 12 February 1826
Ship	State	Description
Mary Emily	United States	The ship was driven ashore and wrecked in the Turks Islands. She was on a voyage from New York to Jamaica.

== 13 February ==
List of shipwrecks: 13 February 1826
Ship	State	Description
Alice and James	United Kingdom	The ship struck a rock in the River Shannon and capsized. She was declared a total loss. Alice and James was on a voyage from Limerick to Liverpool, Lancashire.
Frances & Mary	United Kingdom	The ship sprang a leak in the Atlantic Ocean but was kept afloat by her cargo of timber. Ten of the sixteen people on board survived long enough to be rescued on 7 March by HMS Blonde (Royal Navy). She was on a voyage from Saint John, New Brunswick, British North America to Liverpool, Lancashire. Frances & Mary was towed in to Milford Haven by HMS Diamond (Royal Navy), arriving on 25 September.
Hope	United Kingdom	The ship was driven ashore near Carrickfergus, County Antrim.
Marquis of Wellington	United Kingdom	The ship was wrecked at Castlemaine, County Kerry with the loss of two of her crew. She was on a voyage from Demerara to Greenock, Renfrewshire.
Potomac	Netherlands	The ship ran aground in the Scheldt near Antwerp. She was on a voyage from Batavia, Netherlands East Indies to Antwerp.
Victory	United Kingdom	The ship was driven ashore at Bonmahon, County Waterford. She was on a voyage from Cork to Portsmouth, Hampshire. Victory was refloated on 27 March and taken in to Dungarvan, County Waterford.

== 14 February ==
List of shipwrecks: 14 February 1826
Ship	State	Description
Espadarte	Brazil	The smack was lost off "Colores".
Prince of Waterloo	United Kingdom	The ship was driven ashore and damaged at Alexandria, Egypt. She was refloated the next day.

== 15 February ==
List of shipwrecks: 15 February 1826
Ship	State	Description
Allen Gilmour	United Kingdom	The ship was driven ashore at Carradale, Wigtownshire. She was on a voyage from Saint John, New Brunswick, British North America to the Clyde.
Courier	United Kingdom	The ship struck the Hurd Rock, off the coast of Cumberland. She put into Whitehaven, where she sank. Courier was on a voyage from London to Whitehaven and Belfast, County Antrim.
Henry	United Kingdom	The ship was wrecked near The Lizard, Cornwall with the loss of all but one of her crew. She was on a voyage from Lisbon, Portugal to London.
Johanna	United Kingdom	The ship was holed by an anchor and sank at Holyhead, Anglesey.

== 16 February ==
List of shipwrecks: 16 February 1826
Ship	State	Description
Frederica	Flag unknown	The ship ran aground on the Herd Sand, in the North Sea off the coast of County Durham, United Kingdom. Her crew were rescued by the North Shields Lifeboat. Frederica was on a voyage from "Frederica" to Hull, Yorkshire, United Kingdom. She was taken in to North Shields on 21 February, where she was repaired.
Gertrude	France	The ship was wrecked on a reef off Inagua, Bahamas. She was on a voyage from Aux Cayes, Haiti to Caen, Calvados.

== 17 February ==
List of shipwrecks: 17 February 1826
Ship	State	Description
Betsey	United Kingdom	The ship departed from Dundalk, County Louth for Liverpool, Lancashire. No further trace, presumed foundered with the loss of all on board.
Charlotte	United Kingdom	The ship was wrecked on the Maplin Sand, in the North Sea off the coast of Essex. Her crew were rescued. She was on a voyage from Ipswich, Suffolk to London.
Maria Sophia	Russia	The ship was driven ashore and wrecked on Stronsay, Orkney Islands, United Kingdom. She was on a voyage from Pärnu to Liverpool, Lancashire, United Kingdom.

== 18 February ==
List of shipwrecks: 18 February 1826
Ship	State	Description
Isabella	United Kingdom	The ship was wrecked on the Boulmer Rocks, Northumberland. She was on a voyage from North Shields, County Durham to Leith, Lothian.
Claremont	United Kingdom	The ship was wrecked in Mount's Bay with the loss of all hands. She was on a voyage from Gallipoli, Ottoman Empire to Bristol, Gloucestershire.
Crossthwaite	United Kingdom	The ship was driven ashore on Feinrich Island, County Galway, where she was subsequently wrecked. She was on a voyage from St. Andrews, New Brunswick, British North America to Limerick.

== 19 February ==
List of shipwrecks: 19 February 1826
Ship	State	Description
Elliot	United Kingdom	The ship ran aground on the Spanish Battery Rocks, North Shields, County Durham. Her crew were rescued. She was refloated on 21 February and taken in to North Shields.
Faith	United Kingdom	The ship was driven ashore at Caister-on-Sea, Norfolk. Her crew were rescued by rocket apparatus. She was on a voyage from Grimsby, Lincolnshire to London.
Mentor	United Kingdom	The ship struck the Cork Sand, in the North Sea off the coast of Essex and was abandoned. She subsequently came ashore near Woodbridge, Suffolk. Mentor was later refloated and taken in to Harwich, Essex.
Minerva	United Kingdom	The ship struck the Rose Sand, in the North Sea off the coast of Lincolnshire and foundered. Her crew were rescued. She was on a voyage from London to Hull, Yorkshire.

== 20 February ==
List of shipwrecks: 20 February 1826
Ship	State	Description
Amelia Elizabeth	Netherlands	The ship capsized at Penzance, Cornwall, United Kingdom and was severely damaged. She was on a voyage from Pernambuco, Brazil to Amsterdam, North Holland.
Amos Botsford	United Kingdom	The brig, on her maiden voyage, was driven ashore and severely damaged at the mouth of the River Ribble. She was on a voyage from the Bay of Fundy to Liverpool, Lancashire. She was refloated on 28 March and taken in to Liverpool.
Betsey	United Kingdom	The ship was driven ashore at Mockbeggar, Cheshire.
Jane	United States	The ship was driven ashore and wrecked at Formby, Lancashire. Her crew were rescued. She was on a voyage from Savannah, Georgia and Bristol, Massachusetts to Liverpool.
Prosperity	United Kingdom	The ship was abandoned off Arendal, Norway. She was on a voyage from Memel, Prussia to Dublin. Prosperity was subsequently taken in to Arendal.
Robert Taylor	United Kingdom	The ship ran aground in the Oost and was wrecked. She was on a voyage from London to Hamburg.
Viscountess Downe	United Kingdom	The ship ran aground in the Oost and was wrecked. She was on a voyage from London to Hamburg.

== 24 February ==
List of shipwrecks: 24 February 1826
Ship	State	Description
Dolphin	United Kingdom	The ship was driven ashore in Wick Bay. She was on a voyage from Wick, Caithness to Waterford. Dolphin was later refloated and taken in to Stromness, Orkney Islands.

== 25 February ==
List of shipwrecks: 25 February 1826
Ship	State	Description
Jemima	United Kingdom	The ship was wrecked on Seal Island, Nova Scotia, British North America with the loss of seven of her crew. She was on a voyage from Saint John, New Brunswick, British North America to London.
Liberator	United Kingdom	The ship struck the Bellona Rock and was abandoned with the loss of three of her crew. She was on a voyage from Liverpool, Lancashire, to Saint John, New Brunswick. Liberator was later towed in to Small Point, Maine, United States in a waterlogged condition. She arrived on 11 March.

== 26 February ==
List of shipwrecks: 26 February 1826
Ship	State	Description
Adriana	France	The ship departed from New York, United States for Havre de Grâce, Seine-Inférieure. No further trace, presumed foundered with the loss of all hands.
Arcadian	United Kingdom	The ship was driven ashore at Stromness, Orkney Islands. She was on a voyage from Wick, Caithness to Waterford.
Mary Francis	United Kingdom	The ship ran aground and was damaged at Holyhead, Anglesey. She was on a voyage from Liverpool, Lancashire to Drogheda, County Louth. Mary Francis was refloated and taken in to Holyhead.
Sarah	United Kingdom	The ship ran aground on the Corton Sand, in the North Sea off the coast of Suffolk. She was refloated but consequently foundered. Her crew were rescued. She was on a voyage from Newcastle upon Tyne, Northumberland to London.

== 27 February ==
List of shipwrecks: 27 February 1826
Ship	State	Description
Delight	United Kingdom	The smack struck a sunken wreck off the Haisborough Sands, in the North Sea off the coast of Norfolk and foundered. All on board were rescued by Eliza (United Kingdom).
Elizabeth	United Kingdom	The ship was wrecked on Sable Island, Nova Scotia, British North America. Her crew survived. She was on a voyage from Saint John, New Brunswick, British North America to London.

== 28 February ==
List of shipwrecks: 28 February 1826
Ship	State	Description
Adele	France	The ship was wrecked on the Florida Reef. Her crew were rescued. She was on a voyage from New Orleans, Louisiana, United States to Havre de Grâce, Seine-Inférieure.
Joseph	United Kingdom	The ship was wrecked on the Gunfleet Sand, in the North Sea off the coast of Essex.
Phœnix Packet	United Kingdom	The ship was run down and sunk off Souter Point, County Durham by Phœnix (United Kingdom). Phoenix Packet was on a voyage from Sunderland, County Durham to Leith, Lothian.
Phœnix	United Kingdom	The ship was run down and sunk in the North Sea off the Souter Lighthouse, County Durham by Phœnix (United Kingdom). Her crew were rescued. She was on a voyage from South Shields, County Durham to Leith, Lothian.
Robert	United Kingdom	The ship was driven ashore and wrecked at Hamburg.
Viss-Doune	Hamburg	The ship was driven ashore and wrecked at Hamburg.

== Unknown date ==
List of shipwrecks: Unknown date in February 1826
Ship	State	Description
Betsey	United Kingdom	The ship foundered in the Irish Sea in late February with the loss of all 43 people on board. she was on a voyage from Dundalk, County Louth, to Liverpool, Lancashire.
Betsey Clarke	United Kingdom	The ship foundered in the Atlantic Ocean with the loss of all but three of her crew. Survivors were rescued by Brabander (Netherlands). Betsey Clarke was on a voyage from Messina, Sicily to London.
Bonne Mère	France	The ship was driven ashore crewless at Sanlúcar de Barrameda, Spain.
Brunswick	(United Kingdom of Great Britain and Ireland) British North America	The ship was wrecked in the Tusket Islands, Nova Scotia in early February. Her crew were rescued. She was on a voyage from Jamaica to Saint John, New Brunswick.
Chart	(United Kingdom of Great Britain and Ireland) Jamaica	The ship was wrecked on the Florida Keys.
Clio	United Kingdom	The ship was wrecked near Wexford in early February. She was on a voyage from Seville, Spain to Liverpool.
Dan	France	The ship was sighted off Ceylon whilst on a voyage from Madras, India to Bordeaux, Gironde. No further trace, presumed foundered with the loss of all hands.
Elizabeth	United Kingdom	The ship ran aground 15 nautical miles (28 km) off Berbice.
Joseph	United Kingdom	The ship was wrecked on the Gunfleet Sand, in the North Sea off the coast of Essex in late February.
Moses Bottsford	United Kingdom	The ship was driven ashore at Lytham St Annes, Lancashire. She was on a voyage from Saint John, New Brunswick, British North America to Liverpool.
Stadt von Emden	Kingdom of Hanover	The ship was driven ashore at La Tremblade, Seine-Inférieure, France. She was on a voyage from Cork, Netherlands to Bordeaux, Gironde, France.
Vos	Netherlands	The ship was lost near Dordrecht, South Holland before 21 February. She was on a voyage from Ferrol, Spain to St. Ubes, Portugal and Bergen, Norway.
