= List of shipwrecks in February 1823 =

The list of shipwrecks in February 1823 includes some ships sunk, foundered, grounded, or otherwise lost during February 1823.

== 1 February ==
List of shipwrecks: 1 February 1823
Ship	State	Description
Betsey and Nelly	United Kingdom	The ship was driven ashore and wrecked near Sunderland, County Durham, Her crew were rescued.
Britannia	United Kingdom	The ship was driven ashore and wrecked at Sunderland with the loss of a crew member.
Brothers	United Kingdom	The sloop was severely damaged on the Herd Sand, in the North Sea off North Shields, County Durham. Her crew were rescued by the North Shields Lifeboat. She was on a voyage from Sunderland to Hastings, Sussex. Brothers was refloated on 17 February and taken in to North Shields.
Cowlstaff	United States	The schooner was driven ashore and wrecked 10 nautical miles (19 km) south of Cape St. Vincent, Portugal. Her crew were rescued. She was on a voyage from Boston, Massachusetts, to Gibraltar.
Deito Feito	Portugal	The ship was wrecked on the Portuguese coast. She was on a voyage from Limerick, United Kingdom, to Gibraltar.
Endeavour's Increase	United Kingdom	The ship was wrecked at Sunderland. Her crew were rescued.
Expedition	United Kingdom	The schooner was driven ashore in the Elbe near Hamburg. She was refloated on 9 February and taken in to Cuxhaven.
Lord Lyndock	United Kingdom	The ship ran aground on the Chico Bank, off the coast of Argentina. She was on a voyage from Gibraltar to Buenos Aires, Argentina. Lord Lyndock was later refloated and arrived at Buenos Aires on 3 March.
Maria	United Kingdom	The brig was driven ashore and wrecked at Sines, Portugal. Her crew survived. She was on a voyage from Liverpool, Lancashire, to Lisbon, Portugal.
Martin	United Kingdom	The ship was wrecked on the Herd Sand. Her crew were rescued by the North Shields Lifeboat.
Neptunus	Sweden	The ship struck the Ortez Bank, off the coast of Argentina and sank. She was on a voyage from Paranaguá, Brazil, to Buenos Aires.
Peggy	United Kingdom	The ship struck the pier at Kingstown, County Dublin, and sank. She was on a voyage from Irvine, Ayrshire, to Dublin.
Perseverant	France	The ship was wrecked on the Bondicar Rocks, in the North Sea off the coast of Northumberland, United Kingdom. Her crew were rescued.
Rebecca	United Kingdom	The brig was driven ashore and wrecked 10 nautical miles (19 km) south of Comporta, Portugal, with the loss of two of her crew. She was on a voyage from Liverpool, Lancashire, to Genoa, Kingdom of Sardinia.
Susannah and Grace	United Kingdom	The brig was driven ashore and wrecked near Odemira, Portugal, with the loss of all but three of her crew. She was on a voyage from Greenock, Renfrewshire, to Saint-Domingue.
Tagus	United Kingdom	The schooner foundered in the English Channel 5 nautical miles (9.3 km) off Rame Head, Cornwall.
Thomas and Dorothy	United Kingdom	The ship sprang a leak in the Boston Deeps and was abandoned by her crew. She was on a voyage from Sunderland to London. Thomas and Dorothy subsequently came ashore at Tetney, Lincolnshire.
Traveller	United Kingdom	The ship was wrecked on the Herd Sand. Her crew were rescued by the North Shields Lifeboat. She was on a voyage from Sunderland to London.
Two Brothers	United Kingdom	The ship was driven ashore and wrecked near Sunderland. Her crew were rescued.
William and Mary	United Kingdom	The sloop was driven ashore and wrecked at Sunderland. Her crew were rescued.

== 2 February ==
List of shipwrecks: 2 February 1823
Ship	State	Description
Active	United Kingdom	The ship was driven ashore at Bamburgh, Northumberland. Her crew were rescued.
Adelphi	United Kingdom	The ship was wrecked 3 leagues (9 nautical miles (17 km)) from Peniche, Portugal, She was on a voyage from Liverpool, Lancashire, to Genoa, Kingdom of Sardinia.
Albion	United Kingdom	The ship ran aground on the Herd Sand, in the North Sea off North Shields, County Durham. Her crew were rescued by the North Shields Lifeboat. Albion was later brought into Sunderland, County Durham, in a severely damaged condition.
Augustus	United Kingdom	The ship was wrecked on the Ross Sands, Northumberland. Her crew were rescued.
Charlotte	United Kingdom	The ship was driven ashore at Bamburgh. Her crew were rescued.
Cornaline	French Navy	The gabarre was driven ashore and wrecked at Lisbon, Portugal, with some loss of life. She was on a voyage from Rochefort, Charente-Maritime to Martinique.
Cyrus	United Kingdom	The ship was driven ashore near Hartlepool, County Durham.
Dido	United Kingdom	The ship was wrecked on the Herd Sand. Her crew were rescued by the North Shields Lifeboat.
Fortitude	United Kingdom	The ship was driven ashore and wrecked at North Sunderland, County Durham, with the loss of all hands.
General Silveira	Portugal	The brig was lost off Cape Espichel. She was on a voyage from Maranhão, Brazil, to Lisbon.
Golfinho	Portugal	The brig sank in the Tagus at Lisbon.
Hastings	United Kingdom	The ship was lost in St. Andrews Bay with the loss of all but three of her crew.
Hoop	United Kingdom	The brigantine was driven ashore and severely damaged at Whitby, North Riding of Yorkshire. Her crew were rescued by the Whitby Lifeboat. She was refloated on 10 February and taken in to Whitby.
Industry	United Kingdom	The ship was driven ashore near Hartlepool.
Jane	United Kingdom	The ship was driven ashore in the Tagus at Lisbon.
Jean	United Kingdom	The ship was driven ashore and wrecked at St. Andrews, Fife. Her nine crew were rescued.
Juno	United Kingdom	The ship was driven ashore near Hartlepool.
Liberty	United Kingdom	The ship was wrecked on the Ross Sands. Her crew were rescued.
Lively	United Kingdom	The ship was driven ashore near Broughty Castle, Perthshire. She was on a voyage from Hull, Yorkshire, to Newcastle upon Tyne, Northumberland
Maggie	United Kingdom	The sloop was driven ashore and wrecked at Boulmer, Northumberland, with the loss of three of her five crew.
Margaret	United Kingdom	The ship was wrecked in Howick Bay. Her crew were rescued.
Margaret & Jane	United Kingdom	The ship was driven ashore near Hartlepool.
Mary	United Kingdom	The ship was driven ashore and wrecked 7 nautical miles (13 km) west of Dunbar, Lothian. Her crew were rescued.
Mermaid	United Kingdom	The ship was driven ashore at Bamburgh with the loss of a crew member.
Mina	United Kingdom	The ship was driven ashore near Johnshaven, Aberdeenshire. Her crew were rescued. She was on a voyage from Sunderland to London.
Nadir	United Kingdom	The ship was wrecked at Blyth, Northumberland.
Neutral	United Kingdom	The schooner was driven ashore and severely damaged at Whitby. Her crew were rescued by the Whitby Lifeboat. She was refloated on 12 February and taken in to Whitby, where she was declared a total loss.
Nyade	Sweden	The ship was captured by pirates off the Isle of Pines, Cuba. She was beached the next day and set afire.
Oak	United Kingdom	The ship was driven ashore and severely damaged at Lisbon.
Olinda Packet	Portugal	The ship sank in the Tagus at Lisbon. She was later refloated.
Perseverance	United Kingdom	The snow was driven ashore and wrecked 4 nautical miles (7.4 km) south of Whitby with the loss of five of her eight crew.
Portland	United Kingdom	The sloop foundered at Port Antonio, Jamaica. Her crew were rescued.
Prince Ernest	United Kingdom	The ship was driven ashore at Gibraltar.
Sarah	United Kingdom	The ship was driven ashore and wrecked at Newbiggin-by-the-Sea, Northumberland with the loss of all hands.
Supply	United Kingdom	The ship was driven ashore near Hartlepool.
Tees	United Kingdom	The ship was driven ashore near Hartlepool.
Tejo	Portugal	The brig sank in the Tagus at Lisbon.
Whiting	United Kingdom	The ship was driven ashore near Hartlepool.
William and Mary	United Kingdom	The ship was driven ashore and wrecked near Bamburgh Castle, Northumberland. She was on a voyage from Sunderland to Hull, Yorkshire.

== 3 February ==
List of shipwrecks: 3 February 1823
Ship	State	Description
Alexander	United Kingdom	The ship ran aground on the Dromor Bank, in the Irish Sea. She was on a voyage from Whitehaven, Cumberland, to Waterford.
Betsey & Mary	United Kingdom	The ship was driven ashore near Dundee, Forfarshire. Her crew were rescued.
Friends	United Kingdom	The ship was driven ashore at "Spital Point". Her crew were rescued.
Gipsey	United Kingdom	The ship was driven ashore at Alnmouth, Northumberland. Her crew were rescued.
Hastings	United Kingdom	The brig was driven ashore and wrecked at Kingsbarns, Fife, with the loss of three of her crew.
Itinerant	United Kingdom	The ship was driven ashore on the coast of Forfarshire with the loss of three of her crew. She was on a voyage from Newcastle upon Tyne, Northumberland, to London.
Jane	Norway	The ship was driven ashore and wrecked on the coast of Forfarshire. She was on a voyage from Arundal, Norway, to Blyth, Northumberland.
John & Sarah	United Kingdom	The ship was driven ashore and wrecked near Dundee. Three crew were rescued by the Dundee Lifeboat.
Mackerel	United Kingdom	The ship was wrecked on the Gaw Bank, in the Firth of Tay with the loss of all hands.
Martha	United Kingdom	The brig was driven ashore near Limerick. She was on a voyage from Limerick to Liverpool.
Michael	United Kingdom	The ship foundered off the mouth of the River Tay.
Phoenix	United Kingdom	The ship was driven ashore and wrecked at San Felipe, Tenerife, Spain. Her crew were rescued by Alert (United Kingdom).
Swift	United Kingdom	The ship was driven ashore at Greenock, Renfrewshire. She was on a voyage from Bristol, Gloucestershire, to Greenock.
Thomas	United Kingdom	The ship was abandoned in the Atlantic Ocean. She was on a voyage from Liverpool to Savannah, Georgia, United States.
Thomas and John	United Kingdom	The ship was driven ashore and wrecked at Alnmouth. her crew were rescued.

== 4 February ==
List of shipwrecks: 4 February 1823
Ship	State	Description
Atalanta	United States	The ship was wrecked on the Royal Shoals. Her crew were rescued. She was on a voyage from New Orleans, Louisiana, to New York.
Aurora	United Kingdom	The ship was wrecked at La Beye, Grenada.
Caroline	United Kingdom	The ship was driven ashore at Sunderland, County Durham. She was refloated on 5 February and taken in to Sunderland.
Commerce	United Kingdom	The ship sank at Hartlepool, County Durham.
Endeavour	United Kingdom	The ship was wrecked near Lagos, Nigeria, with the loss of all but two of her crew. She was on a voyage from Liverpool, Lancashire, to Jamaica.
John and Sarah	United Kingdom	The ship was driven ashore at St. Andrews, Fife, with the loss of three of her six crew.
Mary Ann	United Kingdom	The ship was driven ashore and wrecked Cresswell, Northumberland. Her crew were rescued. She was refloated on 27 February and taken in to the River Coquet.
Ranger	United Kingdom	The ship was wrecked on the Roustin Rocks, off the Lothian coast.
Sarah	United Kingdom	The ship was driven ashore and wrecked near Blyth, Northumberland, with the loss of all hands.
Thomas and Dorothy	United Kingdom	The ship sprang a leak off Boston, Lincolnshire, and was abandoned. She came ashore at Tetney, Lincolnshire.
Whiting	United Kingdom	The ship sank at Hartlepool. She was on a voyage from Sunderland to London.

== 5 February ==
List of shipwrecks: 5 February 1823
Ship	State	Description
Ann	United Kingdom	The ship was wrecked on the Nash Sands, in the Bristol Channel off the coast of Glamorgan with the loss of two of the nine people on board. She was on a voyage from Cork to Bristol, Gloucestershire.
Augustus	United Kingdom	The ship was wrecked on the Ross Sands, Northumberland, with the loss of all hands.
Caroline	United Kingdom	The ship was beached at Milford Haven, Pembrokeshire.
Endeavour	United Kingdom	The ship departed from Whitby, Yorkshire, for King's Lynn, Norfolk. No further trace, presumed foundered in the North Sea with the loss of all hands.
Fortitude	United Kingdom	The ship was driven ashore at North Sunderland, Northumberland, with the loss of all hands.
Liberty	United Kingdom	The ship was driven ashore on the Ross Sands. Her crew were rescued.
Mercury	United Kingdom	The ship was driven ashore and wrecked at Marske-by-the-Sea, Yorkshire with the loss of a crew member. Survivors were rescued by the Redcar Lifeboat.
Prince Coburg	United Kingdom	The sloop was driven ashore and wrecked near Sandown Castle, Kent. Her crew were rescued. She was on a voyage from Poole, Dorset, to London.
Young Thomas	United Kingdom	The ship was wrecked on The Platters, in the North Sea off Harwich, Essex. She was on a voyage from Great Yarmouth, Norfolk, to London.

== 6 February ==
List of shipwrecks: 6 February 1823
Ship	State	Description
Adonis	United Kingdom	The ship was driven ashore at Great Yarmouth, Norfolk. She was on a voyage from London to Leeds, Yorkshire.
Ann	United Kingdom	The ship was wrecked at Strangford, County Antrim. She was on a voyage from Strangford to Liverpool, Lancashire.
Hero	United Kingdom	The ship was driven ashore near Youghal, County Cork. Her crew were rescued. She was on a voyage from Newport, Monmouthshire to Cork. Hero was refloated in late February.
Hope	United Kingdom	The ship was lost near Crookhaven, County Cork, with the loss of seven of the thirteen people on board. She was on a voyage from Newry, County Down, to New York, United States.
James	United Kingdom	The ship was driven onto the North Bull, in the Irish Sea off the coast of County Dublin.
Jane & Matilda	United Kingdom	The ship was driven ashore and damaged in Swanage Bay. She was refloated on 9 February.
Prince Coburg	United Kingdom	The sloop was driven ashore and wrecked at Sandown Castle, Kent. Her crew were rescued. She was on a voyage from Poole, Dorset, to London.
Swift	United Kingdom	The ship was driven ashore on the Isle of May. Her four crew were rescued. Swift was later refloated in taken in to Anstruther, Fife, in a damaged state.

== 7 February ==
List of shipwrecks: 7 February 1823
Ship	State	Description
Brilliant	United Kingdom	The ship was abandoned in the Atlantic Ocean. All on board were rescued by Young Phœnix (United Kingdom). Brilliant was on a voyage from St. Andrews, New Brunswick, British North America, to Dublin.
Brothers	United Kingdom	The ship was driven ashore near Dublin.
Content	United Kingdom	The ship was wrecked near Holyhead, Anglesey. Her crew were rescued.
Emerald	United Kingdom	The ship ran aground and was damaged in the Rock Channel. She was on a voyage from Liverpool, Lancashire, to Boston, Massachusetts, United States. Emerald was later refloated and taken in to Liverpool for repairs.
Jonge Jancke	Netherlands	The ship was driven ashore at Wissant, Pas-de-Calais, France. She was on a voyage from Messina, Sicily, to Amsterdam, North Holland.
Lark	United Kingdom	The ship was wrecked on the Spanish Battery Rocks, North Shields, County Durham. Her crew were rescued.
Liddell	United Kingdom	The ship was driven ashore near Bridlington, Yorkshire. She was on a voyage from Southampton, Hampshire, to North Shields. Liddell was later refloated and taken in to Bridlington.
Richard	United Kingdom	The ship was driven ashore and damaged at Newry, County Antrim. She was on a voyage from Pernambuco, Brazil, to Liverpool. Richard was later refloated and taken in to Warrenpoint, County Down.
Scalarea	United Kingdom	The ship was driven ashore near Naples, Kingdom of the Two Sicilies. She was on a voyage from a Cornish port to Naples.

== 8 February ==
List of shipwrecks: 8 February 1823
Ship	State	Description
Albion	United Kingdom	The ship was wrecked near Swansea, Glamorgan, She was on a voyage from Liverpool, Lancashire, to Watchet, Somerset.
Eliza	United Kingdom	The ship was wrecked on the Horse Shoe Reef, off the coast of Antigua. Her crew were rescued. She was on a voyage from Liverpool to St. Thomas, Virgin Islands.
Endeavour's Increase	United Kingdom	The ship was wrecked at Sunderland. Her crew were rescued.
Hornby	United Kingdom	The ship was discovered abandoned in the North Sea 20 nautical miles (37 km) off Tynemouth Castle, Northumberland.
Lively	United Kingdom	The ship was driven ashore on the west coast of Inchkeith and sank. She was later refloated and taken in to "Burntistown".
Mary	United Kingdom	The ship was wrecked at Dunan, Isle of Skye. Her crew were rescued. She was on a voyage from Dublin to Whitehaven, Cumberland.
Modeste	France	The ship was driven ashore near Boulogne, Pas-de-Calais. She was on a voyage from Bordeaux, Gironde, to Boulogne.
Nelly and Kitty	United Kingdom	The sloop was driven ashore and wrecked at Mockbeggar Cheshire. She was on a voyage from Westport, County Mayo, to Liverpool.

== 9 February ==
List of shipwrecks: 9 February 1823
Ship	State	Description
Euphemia	United Kingdom	The ship was driven ashore at Johnshaven, Aberdeenshire. Her crew were rescued. She was on a voyage from South Shields, County Durham, to London.
Exchange	United Kingdom	The ship was driven ashore in the Formby Channel. She was on a voyage from Virginia, United States, to Liverpool, Lancashire. Exchange was refloated on 10 February and taken in to Liverpool.
Martin	United Kingdom	The brig was driven ashore at Margate, Kent. She was on a voyage from Limerick to London. Martin was later refloated and resumed her voyage.
Nelly and Kitty	United Kingdom	The sloop was driven ashore and wrecked near Mockbeggar, Cheshire. She was on a voyage from Westport, County Mayo, to Liverpool.
William	United Kingdom	The sloop was damaged by fire off Belfast, County Antrim. She was on a voyage from Killough, County Down, to Liverpool.

== 10 February ==
List of shipwrecks: 10 February 1823
Ship	State	Description
Ann	United Kingdom	The ship was driven ashore in Dundrum Bay.
Aurora	United Kingdom	The ship was driven ashore near Boulmer, Northumberland.
Belvoir Castle	United Kingdom	The ship was driven ashore in Dundrum Bay. She was refloated on 12 March and taken in to Whitehaven, Cumberland.
Henry	United Kingdom	The ship was driven ashore in Dundrum Bay. She was later refloated.
Matilda	United Kingdom	The ship was driven ashore at Newry, County Antrim. She was on a voyage from Jamaica to Liverpool, Lancashire. Matilda was later refloated; she arrived at Liverpool on 15 February.
Provestein	Norway	The ship was driven ashore and wrecked in Dundrum Bay. She was on a voyage from Frederickshall to Dublin, United Kingdom.
Richard	United Kingdom	The ship was driven ashore at Newry. She was on a voyage from Pernambuco, Brazil, to Liverpool.

== 11 February ==
List of shipwrecks: 11 February 1823
Ship	State	Description
Actif	France	The brig foundered in the Atlantic Ocean off Cape St. Vincent, Portugal. Her crew were rescued. She was on a voyage from Madeira, Portugal, to Antwerp, Netherlands.
Flora	United Kingdom	The ship foundered in Caernarfon Bay near Llangwyfan, Denbighshire, with the loss of all hands.
Lady Charlotte Hope	United Kingdom	The ship was driven ashore at Killala, County Mayo. Her crew were rescued. She was on a voyage from Ballina, County Mayo, to Liverpool, Lancashire.
Two Brothers	United States	A diver examines an anchor at the Two Brothers wreck site on August 24, 2008. The whaler was wrecked on the French Frigate Shoals, Northwestern Hawaiian Islands. Her crew were rescued by Martha (United States).

== 12 February ==
List of shipwrecks: 12 February 1823
Ship	State	Description
Nostra de la Sinta	Spain	The ship was driven ashore south of Figueira da Foz, Portugal. Her crew were rescued. She was on a voyage from Vigo to Cádiz.
Susannah	United Kingdom	The ship was driven ashore and wrecked at Churchtown, County Wexford, with the loss of two of her crew. She was on a voyage from Waterford to Chichester, Sussex.

== 13 February ==
List of shipwrecks: 13 February 1823
Ship	State	Description
Blucher	France	The ship foundered off Bergen, Norway. Her crew were rescued. She was on a voyage from Marseille, Bouches-du-Rhône to Amsterdam, North Holland, Netherlands.
Haabet	Sweden	The ship was driven ashore and damaged near Bergen, Norway. She was later refloated and taken in to Alderwaggen.
Turbulent	Denmark	The ship foundered off Bergen. Her crew were rescued. She was on a voyage from Genoa, Kingdom of Sardinia, to Copenhagen.

== 14 February ==
List of shipwrecks: 14 February 1823
Ship	State	Description
Ebenezer	United Kingdom	The ship collided with Nancy (United Kingdom) off Great Yarmouth, Norfolk, and sank. Her crew were rescued. She was on a voyage from South Shields, County Durham, to Rochester, Kent
George and Mary	United Kingdom	The ship was wrecked off Lindisfarne, Northumberland, with the loss of all hands.
Liverpool Packet	United Kingdom	The ship was driven ashore in the Bay of Luce. she was on a voyage from Liverpool, Lancashire, to Aberdeen. She was later refloated and taken in to Dromore, County Down.
Ottomon	Danzig	The ship was beached at South Uist, Outer Hebrides, United Kingdom. She was on a voyage from Danzig to Rochefort, Charente-Maritime, France. Ottomon was refloated on 28 February.
Sarah	United Kingdom	The ship ran aground and sank on the Herd Sand, in the North Sea off the coast of County Durham. Her crew were rescued.
Sophia	(United Kingdom of Great Britain and Ireland) Antigua	The schooner was wrecked on the Anegada Reef, Virgin Islands. She was on a voyage from Antigua to Curaçao.
Victory	United Kingdom	The ship was driven ashore near Hoylake, Lancashire. She was on a voyage from Halifax, Nova Scotia, British North America, to Liverpool, Lancashire. Victory was refloated on 17 February and taken in to Liverpool.

== 15 February ==
List of shipwrecks: 15 February 1823
Ship	State	Description
John and Isabella	United Kingdom	The ship was lost near Bamburgh, Northumberland, with the loss of all hands.
John and Mary	United Kingdom	The full-rigged ship foundered in the North Sea off Bamburgh.
Rufford	United Kingdom	The ship foundered in the Broad Fourteens, in the North Sea. Her crew were rescued by Sociable (United Kingdom).
Sarah	United Kingdom	The ship was driven ashore neasr Cherbourg, Seine-Inférieure, France. She was on a voyage from Cork to London.
William & Ann	United Kingdom	The ship was wrecked on the coast of Norfolk with the loss of all hands.

== 16 February ==
List of shipwrecks: 16 February 1823
Ship	State	Description
Friends	United Kingdom	The ship foundered in the Atlantic Ocean off Port Isaac, Cornwall.

== 17 February ==
List of shipwrecks: 17 February 1823
Ship	State	Description
Trafalgar	United Kingdom	The ship was abandoned in the Irish Sea 16 nautical miles (30 km) east by south of Howth, County Dublin.

== 18 February ==
List of shipwrecks: 18 February 1823
Ship	State	Description
Ann and James	United Kingdom	The ship was wrecked at "Pullaheeny", County Mayo. She was on a voyage from the Clyde to Sligo.
Blucher	France	The ship foundered near Bergen, Norway. She was on a voyage from Marseille, Bouches-du-Rhône to Amsterdam, North Holland, Netherlands.
Desire	United Kingdom	The collier, a brig, was driven ashore and wrecked at Brighton, Sussex.
Eleanora	United Kingdom	The ship was driven ashore and wrecked at Bangor, County Down. She was on a voyage from Dublin to Belfast, County Antrim.
Fates	United Kingdom	The ship was driven ashore and wrecked at Littlehampton, Sussex.
Four Sisters	United Kingdom	The ship foundered in the River Humber with the loss of all on board. She was on a voyage from King's Lynn, Norfolk, to Knottingley, Yorkshire.
Gibraltar	United Kingdom	The ship was driven ashore near Kirkwall, Orkney Islands. She was on a voyage from Easdale Island, Argyllshire, to Leith, Lothian.
Lady Caroline	United Kingdom	The ship was driven ashore in the Bay of Luce. She was on a voyage from Liverpool, Lancashire, to Tobermory, Isle of Mull.
Mercury	United Kingdom	The ship ran ashore north of Aberdeen. She was later refloated and taken in to Aberdeen for repairs.
Perseverance	United Kingdom	The ship was driven ashore and wrecked at Bootle, Lancashire. Her crew were rescued. She was on a voyage from Faro, Portugal, to Liverpool, Lancashire.
Turbulent	Denmark	The ship foundered near Bergen. Her crew were rescued. She was on a voyage from Copenhagen to Messina, Sicily.

== 19 February ==
List of shipwrecks: 19 February 1823
Ship	State	Description
Goodson	United Kingdom	The ship was driven ashore and wrecked on Steep Holm, in the Bristol Channel. Her crew were rescued. She was on a voyage from Plymouth, Devon, to Bristol, Gloucestershire.
Lord Nelson	United Kingdom	The ship was driven ashore and wrecked near Cruden Bay, Aberdeenshire, with the loss of all hands. She was on a voyage from Sunderland, County Durham, to Portsoy, Aberdeenshire.
Phœbe	United Kingdom	The ship was lost near Tralee, County Kerry. Her crew were rescued. She was on a voyage from Saint John, New Brunswick, British North America, to Liverpool, Lancashire.
Rose Virginie	France	The ship driven ashore between "Amberville" and "Fontaine". She was on a voyage from Marseille, Bouches-du-Rhône to Rouen, Seine-Inférieure.

== 20 February ==
List of shipwrecks: 20 February 1823
Ship	State	Description
Ardent	United Kingdom	The sloop was driven ashore at Margate, Kent. She was on a voyage from Belfast, County Down, to London.
Cosmopolite	France	The ship was driven ashore at Havre de Grâce, Seine-Inférieure. She was on a voyage from Havre de Grâce to Dieppe.
Harvey	United Kingdom	The ship foundered in the English Channel off the Île de Batz, Finistère, France. She was on a voyage from London to Jamaica.
Little Philip	France	The ship was driven ashore near "Soquince". She was on a voyage from Fécamp to Rouen, Seine-Inférieure.

== 21 February ==
List of shipwrecks: 21 February 1823
Ship	State	Description
Little Sam	United Kingdom	The ship was wrecked at Bridlington, East Riding of Yorkshire.
Molly	United Kingdom	The ship was lost in Bridgwater Bay with the loss of all hands. She was on a voyage from Bridgwater, Somerset, to Swansea, Glamorgan.

== 24 February ==
List of shipwrecks: 24 February 1823
Ship	State	Description
Albatross	United Kingdom	The ship collided with Isabella and Dorothy (United Kingdom) in the North Sea off the Haisborough Sands and foundered with the loss of her captain. Survivors were rescued by Isabella and Dorothy.
Dumfries	United Kingdom	The sloop was driven ashore between Maryport and Workington, Cumberland.
Mary Ann	United Kingdom	The sloop was wrecked near Boscastle, Cornwall.

== 25 February ==
List of shipwrecks: 25 February 1823
Ship	State	Description
Cornwallis	United Kingdom	The ship was driven ashore in Waterford Bay. She was on a voyage from Waterford to Shoreham-by-Sea, Sussex. Cornwallis was refloated on 27 February.
Robinson	United Kingdom	The ship departed from Liverpool, Lancashire, for Dublin. She subsequently foundered off Preston, Lancashire, with the loss of all hands.
Scipio	United Kingdom	The ship was driven ashore at Douglas, Isle of Man. She subsequently floated off and later came ashore at Ravenglass, Cumberland

== 26 February ==
List of shipwrecks: 26 February 1823
Ship	State	Description
Ann	United Kingdom	The ship ran aground on the North Bank, in Liverpool Bay and sank. She was on a voyage from Sligo to Liverpool, Lancashire.

== 27 February ==
List of shipwrecks: 27 February 1823
Ship	State	Description
Hammond	United States	The ship was abandoned in the Atlantic Ocean. She was on a voyage from the Turks Islands to Mobile, Alabama.
Minerva	United Kingdom	The ship was driven ashore at Cardigan. She was on a voyage from Cardiff, Glamorgan, to Bowling, Dunbartonshire.

== 28 February ==
List of shipwrecks: 28 February 1823
Ship	State	Description
Mountaineer	United Kingdom	The ship was wrecked on Cape Sable Island, British North America. She was on a voyage from Saint John, New Brunswick, British North America, to Liverpool, Lancashire.

== Unknown date ==
List of shipwrecks: Unknown date in February 1823
Ship	State	Description
Albert	United States	The ship was wrecked whilst on a voyage from Bordeaux, Gironde, France, to Charleston, South Carolina. The sole survivor was rescued on 3 March by Robert Quaile (United States).
Ann	United Kingdom	The sloop sank at Peterhead, Aberdeenshire, before 14 February. She was on a voyage from Portsoy, Abefeddnshire, to London.
Anna Amanda Amelia	France	The ship was lost near St. Ubes, Portugal, in early February. She was on a voyage from Stockholm, Sweden, to Marseille, Bouches-du-Rhône.
Ashling	United Kingdom	The sloop was wrecked at São Miguel, Azores, Portugal, before 6 February.
Bonne Mère	France	The ship collided with Alonzo (United Kingdom) in the Atlantic Ocean (34°15′N 63°19′W) and was abandoned. Alonzo rescued the crew of Bonne Mère, which was on a voyage from Bordeaux, Gironde, to New York, United States.
Eliza	United States	The ship was lost on the English Bank, in the South Atlantic with the loss of all but three of her crew. She was on a voyage from Bahia, Brazil, to Buenos Aires, Argentina.
Friends	United Kingdom	The ship was driven ashore at Hudshead, Yorkshire. Her crew were rescued.
Frolic	United Kingdom	The ship was wrecked on the island of "St. Georgio Skiro". She was on a voyage from Alexandria, Egypt, to Constantinople, Ottoman Empire.
Fullarton	United Kingdom	The ship was wrecked on the Hoyle Bank, in Liverpool Bay. She was on a voyage from Ayr to Liverpool, Lancashire.
Ida	United Kingdom	The ship was driven ashore at Great Yarmouth, Norfolk. She was refloated on 13 February and taken in to Great Yarmouth for repairs.
John and Isabella	United Kingdom	The ship was driven ashore and wrecked at Goswick, Northumberland, with the loss of all hands.
King George	United Kingdom	The ship foundered in the North Sea off Sunderland, County Durham, in early February.
Mary	United Kingdom	The sloop was driven ashore and wrecked at São Miguel with the loss of two of her crew before 6 February.
Neptunus	Denmark	The ship was wrecked on Skagen with the loss of all hands before 13 February.
Prince of Saxe-Coburg	United Kingdom	The ship was driven ashore at Deal, Kent. She was on a voyage from Poole, Dorset, to London. Prince of Saxe-Coburg was refloated on 8 February and taken in to Ramsgate, Kent.
Rebecca	United Kingdom	The ship was lost on the coast of Portugal. She was on a voyage from Liverpool, Lancashire, to Genoa, Kingdom of Sardinia.
Robin	United Kingdom	The ship was lost at St. Mary's, Isles of Scilly, before 15 February. Her crew were rescued.
San Marcos	Portugal	The ship was driven ashore and wrecked at Lisbon before 8 February.
Spartan	United Kingdom	The ship was lost near Lagos, Ottoman Greece.
Trafalgar	United Kingdom	The ship was abandoned in the Irish Sea 15 nautical miles (28 km) off Howth, County Dublin.
Traveller	United Kingdom	The schooner was driven ashore and wrecked at São Miguel before 6 February. Her crew were rescued.
Two Brothers	United States	The ship was wrecked on "Nashan Island". She was on a voyage from British Honduras to Boston, Massachusetts.
Ville de St. Pierre	France	The ship ran aground on the Sugar Key and was subsequently taken possession of pirates. She was on a voyage from Bordeaux to Havana, Cuba.
Ville de Trinité	France	The ship was lost near St. Ubes in early February. She was on a voyage from Martinique to Havre de Grâce, Seine-Inférieure.
William	United Kingdom	The ship foundered in the North Sea off Winterton-on-Sea, Norfolk on or before 7 February with the loss of at least three lives.
William and Ann	United Kingdom	The ship was lost on the coast of Norfolk with the loss of all hands.
