= List of shipwrecks in September 1869 =

The list of shipwrecks in September 1869 includes ships sunk, foundered, grounded, or otherwise lost during September 1869.

== 1 September ==
List of shipwrecks: 1 September 1869
Ship	State	Description
Express	United Kingdom	The ship ran aground in the Swash. She was on a voyage from Poole, Dorset to London. She was refloated and put back to Poole in a leaky condition.
Faith	United Kingdom	The Yorkshire Billyboy struck rocks near Flamborough Head, Yorkshire and sank. Her crew were rescued. She was on a voyage from Sunderland, County Durham to London.
Havelock	United Kingdom	The ship was wrecked on the Domesnes Reef, in the Baltic Sea. She was on a voyage from Middlesbrough, Yorkshire to Riga, Russia.
James Dixon	United Kingdom	The steamship was wrecked on Gotland, Sweden. She was on a voyage from Kronstadt, Russia to London.
St. Louis	United Kingdom	The ship collided with St. Austell (United Kingdom) and sank in the North Sea. She was on a voyage from Brest, Finistère, France to Sunderland, County Durham.

== 2 September ==
List of shipwrecks: 2 September 1869
Ship	State	Description
Anton	Bremen	The ship was severely damaged by fire at Bremen. She was on a voyage from Bremen to New York, United States.
Archimedes	United Kingdom	The steamship was driven ashore at Falhead, Gotland, Sweden. She was on a voyage from Kronstadt, Russia to London.
Cornelia Hendrika	Netherlands	The ship departed from Hong Kong for Yokohama, Japan. No further trace, presumed foundered with the loss of all hands.
Forward	United Kingdom	The schooner was wrecked on Stoneskar, Russia. Her crew were rescued. She was on a voyage from Grimsby, Lincolnshire to Saint Petersburg, Russia.
Omaha	Flag unknown	The ship was driven ashore on Sheldric Island, New Brunswick, Canada She was relfoated.

== 3 September ==
List of shipwrecks: 3 September 1869
Ship	State	Description
Chanticleer	United Kingdom	The barque was run into by the brig Jewel (United Kingdom) and sank off Morte Point, Devon. . Chanticleer was on a voyage from Cardiff, Glamorgan to Havana, Cuba.
Eagle	United Kingdom	The smack was driven ashore and wrecked at Scotstown Head, Aberdeenshire. Her crew were rescued.
Hringhorne	Prussia	The ship was driven ashore and wrecked at Jershöft. She was on a voyage from "Skeppswick" to London, United Kingdom.
John and Robert	United Kingdom	The smack was driven ashore at Kilchousland Chapel, Argyllshire.
Marathon	United Kingdom	The steamship ran aground on the Salmedina Rocks, at the mouth of the Guadalquivir.
Old England	United Kingdom	The ship was abandoned off the Cape Verde Islands. Her crew survived. She was on a voyage from Cardiff, Glamorgan to Galle, Ceylon.
Standard	United Kingdom	The barque was driven ashore near Fairwater, Aberdeenshire. She was on a voyage from Peterhead, Aberdeenshire to Danzig.
William Scott Walker	United Kingdom	The steamship struck a sunken rock off Ballintoy, County Antrim and was holed. She was taken in to Londonderry in a leaky condition.

== 4 September ==
List of shipwrecks: 4 September 1869
Ship	State	Description
Athena	Greece	The ship collided with the schooner Anna (Italy) and was run ashore at Parenzo, Austria-Hungary. She was on a voyage from Trieste to Patras.
Catherina Cornelia	United Kingdom	The ship was wrecked at Neufahrwasser, Prussia.
Ezra	Canada	The ship was wrecked on Bodie Island, North Carolina, United States with the loss of six of her crew. She was on a voyage from Liverpool, Lancashire, United Kingdom to Saint John, New Brunswick and Baltimore, Maryland, United States.
Golden Grove	United Kingdom	The ship was driven ashore on Seskar, Russia. Her crew survived.
Louisville	United Kingdom	The ship was abandoned in the Atlantic Ocean. She was on a voyage from Liverpool to Halifax, Nova Scotia, Canada.
Robin Hood	United States	The ship was destroyed by fire at Baker Island.
Standard	United Kingdom	The ship was driven ashore at Neufahrwasser. She was on a voyage from Peterhead, Aberdeenshire to Danzig.
St. Bede	United Kingdom	The steamship ran aground on the Maplin Sand, in the North Sea off the coast of Essex. She was on a voyage from London to Cardiff.

== 5 September ==
List of shipwrecks: 5 September 1869
Ship	State	Description
Susan M. Smith	United States	The whaler, a schooner, was wrecked. Five survivors were rescued by Flatworth (United Kingdom).
William	United Kingdom	The collier, a brig, foundered in the North Sea 90 nautical miles (170 km) off the coast of County Durham. Her crew were rescued by Victoria (Hamburg). William was on a voyage from South Shields, County Durham to Copenhagen, Denmark.

== 6 September ==
List of shipwrecks: 6 September 1869
Ship	State	Description
Banquereau	France	The brig was driven ashore and severely damaged at Newquay, Cornwall, United Kingdom. She was on a voyage from Larache, Morocco to Dunkirk, Nord. She was refloated the next day.
Emma	United Kingdom	The ship was abandoned in the North Sea. Her crew were rescued. She was on a voyage from "Swartwick" to Antwerp, Belgium.
Hannah	United Kingdom	The ship was driven ashore on the coast of the Courland Governorate. She was on a voyage from Riga, Russia to Hartlepool, County Durham.

== 7 September ==
List of shipwrecks: 7 September 1869
Ship	State	Description
Prima Donna	United Kingdom	The schooner was abandoned in the North Sea. Her crew were rescued by Bien (Flag unknown). Prima Donna was on a voyage from Larvik, Norway to Hull, Yorkshire.
Yarra	Flag unknown	The 32-ton paddle steamer stranded on a spit at the mouth of New Zealand's Hokitika River and broke up.

== 8 September ==
List of shipwrecks: 8 September 1869
Ship	State	Description
Alabama	United States	The New England Gale of 1869: The fishing schooner was wrecked in a gale at Kennebunk, Maine, a total loss. Crew rescued.
Andes	United States	The New England Gale of 1869: The fishing schooner was wrecked in a gale at Boothbay, Maine, a total loss. Crew rescued.
Catharina	Denmark	The ship was driven ashore and severely damaged at Kalmar, Sweden. She was refloated and taken in to Oscarshamn.
Cosmos	United Kingdom	The ship was wrecked on the Mosquito Coast. Her crew were rescued.
Helen Eliza	United States	The New England Gale of 1869:The fishing schooner was wrecked on rocks on the southeast side of Peaks Island in Casco Bay off the coast of Maine and broke up with the loss of 11 lives.
Marys	United Kingdom	The ship was driven ashore. She was on a voyage from Glasson Dock, Lancashire to Quebec City, Canada. She was consequently condemned.
Pearl	New Zealand	The ketch was wrecked at the mouth of the Grey River while en route from Dunedin. The weather was calm but there was a heavy swell. She capsized, and three crew members were drowned.
Potomac	United States	The New England Gale of 1869: The fishing schooner was wrecked in a gale at Orr's Island, Maine, a total loss. Crew rescued.
"Rambler"	United States	The New England Gale of 1869: The boat was lost off Portland, Maine.
Salus	United Kingdom	The ship was driven ashore on Prince Edward Island, Canada. She was on a voyage from Shediac, Nova Scotia, Canada to Liverpool, Lancashire. She was consequently condemned.
Thistle	United Kingdom	The barque was destroyed by fire at Cayo Santa Maria. Her crew were rescued by a Spanish Navy warship. She was on a voyage from Glasgow, Renfrewshire to Matanzas, Cuba.
Yankee Girl	United States	The fishing schooner was lost, all 11 crew was killed.
"Young Raven"	United States	The New England Gale of 1869: The Pilot Boat was driven ashore at Pavilion Beach, a total loss.

== 9 September ==
List of shipwrecks: 9 September 1869
Ship	State	Description
Cape Horn	United Kingdom	The ship was wrecked at Pichidangui, Chile. Her crew were rescued. She was on a voyage from Valparaíso, Chile to Liverpool, Lancashire.
Fulton	France	The steamship collided with Thomas Gales (United Kingdom) and foundered off Great Yarmouth, Norfolk, United Kingdom. Her twelve crew were rescued by the smack Ethelbert (United Kingdom). Fulton was on a voyage from Middlesbrough. Yorkshire, United Kingdom to Dunkirk, Nord.
Lochnagar	United Kingdom	The ship departed from Falmouth, Cornwall for Zwijndrecht, South Holland, Netherlands. No further trace, presumed foundered with the loss of all hands.
Rambler	New Zealand	The 72-ton schooner became stranded at the mouth of the Ōkārito River and became a total wreck.
Ribe	Italy	The barque ran aground at the entrance to the Dardanelles. She was on a voyage from Constantinople, Ottoman Empire to an English port.

== 10 September ==
List of shipwrecks: 10 September 1869
Ship	State	Description
Balgowan	United Kingdom	The barque was wrecked in the Sea of Marmara. Her crew were rescued. She was on a voyage from Venice, Italy to Constantinople, Ottoman Empire.
Bamba	United Kingdom	The cutter was driven ashore at Southend-on-Sea, Essex. All three people on board were rescued.
Elizabeth	United Kingdom	The barque was driven ashore in the Rabbit Islands, Ottoman Empire. She was on a voyage from Cardiff, Glamorgan to Constantinople, Ottoman Empire. She was refloated with assistance from the brig Etna (Flag unknown) and found to be severely leaky.
Hippolyte	United Kingdom	The brig ran aground on the Shivering Sand, in the Thames Estuary. She was on a voyage from the West Indies to London.
Osprey	United Kingdom	The steamship collided with another vessel in the River Thames and was disabled. Her passengers were taken off by Cupid (United Kingdom). Osprey was on a voyage from Woolwich, Kent, to London.
Winona	Bremen	The ship was driven ashore on Heligoland. She was on a voyage from Akyab, Burma to Bremen. She was later refloated and resumed her voyage.
Unnamed	Flag unknown	The ship foundered in the Atlantic Ocean with the loss of all on board.

== 11 September ==
List of shipwrecks: 11 September 1869
Ship	State	Description
Anna	United Kingdom	The schooner was driven ashore and wrecked at Southwold, Suffolk. She was on a voyage from Whitby, Yorkshire to Rotterdam, South Holland, Netherlands.
Bamba	United Kingdom	The cutter yacht sank in the River Thames at Erith, Kent. Both people on board were rescued by HMS Worcester (Royal Navy).
Countess of Leicester	(United Kingdom of Great Britain and Ireland) Guernsey	The brig sprang a leak and sank in the English Channel off Beachy Head, Sussex with the loss of a crew member. Survivors were rescued by Tulip (United Kingdom). Countess of Leicester was on a voyage from Guernsey to London.
Diamond	United Kingdom	The brig sank in the English Channel off Newhaven, Sussex with the loss of all eight crew. She was on a voyage from South Shields, County Durham to Portsmouth, Hampshire.
Golden Fleece	United Kingdom	The steamship sank off Sully, Glamorgan with the loss of one of her 43 crew. She was on a voyage from Penarth, Glamorgan to Alexandria, Egypt.
Hyderabad	United Kingdom	The ship was wrecked on a reef 45 nautical miles (83 km) south of Jeddah, Habesh Eyalet with the loss of 25 lives. She was on a voyage from Jeddah to Zanzibar.
Minquiers Lightship	Trinity House	The lightship was wrecked on Chausey, Manche, France. Her crew were rescued.
Salathiel	United Kingdom	The schooner foundered off Portland, Dorset with the loss of both crew. She was on a voyage from Weymouth, Dorset to Cardiff, Glamorgan.
St Cloud	France	The ship departed from Camaret-sur-Mer, Finistère for Watchet, Somerset, United Kingdom. No further trace, presumed foundered with the los of all hands.
Volante	United Kingdom	The yacht was driven ashore and wrecked at Ryde, Isle of Wight. All twelve people on board were rescued by the Ryde Lifeboat Captain Hans Busk ( Royal National Lifeboat Institution). Volante was refloated on 22 September and towed to Gosport, Hampshire by the paddle tug Camel (United Kingdom). She was beached there.
Unnamed	Flag unknown	The brig foundered in the North Sea 10 nautical miles (19 km) off Harwich, Essex, United Kingdom with the loss of all hands.

== 12 September ==
List of shipwrecks: 12 September 1869
Ship	State	Description
Abundance	United Kingdom	The ship was driven ashore and wrecked near Weston-Super-Mare, Somerset.
Acustus	United Kingdom	The ship departed from Queenstown, County Cork for London. No further trace, presumed foundered with the loss of all hands.
Arrow	United Kingdom	The schooner ran aground on the Brambles, in the Solent. Her crew were rescued by the yacht Zara (United Kingdom). Arrow was on a voyage from Whitstable, Kent to Runcorn, Cheshire. She was refloated and taken in to Ryde, Isle of Wight in a leaky condition.
Beaver	United Kingdom	The ship foundered in the Atlantic Ocean 30 nautical miles (56 km) off the Isles of Scilly. Her crew were rescued by Annie Williams (United Kingdom). Beaver was on a voyage from Ardrossan, Ayrshire to Montevideo, Uruguay.
Belle	United Kingdom	The schooner capsized and sank at Waterford. Both crew were rescued.
Carnatic	United Kingdom	The wreck of Carnatic, The Illustrated London News, 16 October 1869. The steamship was wrecked on the Sha`b Abu Nuhas reef in the Red Sea with the loss of 31 lives. She was on a voyage from Suez, Egypt to Bombay, India.
Chance	United Kingdom	The ship was assisted in to Ramsgate, Kent in a sinking condition. She was on a voyage from Dartmouth, Devon to Goole, Yorkshire.
Commodore	(United Kingdom of Great Britain and Ireland) Jersey	The smack ran aground and sank on the Doom Bar. Both crew were rescued by a pilot gig. She was on a voyage from Saundersfoot, Pembrokeshire to Saint-Malo, Ille-et-Vilaine, France.
Fanny Kemble	United Kingdom	The ship foundered in the Bristol Channel. Her crew were rescued. She was on a voyage from Sydney, New South Wales to Bridgwater, Somerset.
Lilla	United Kingdom	The schooner was driven ashore at Cork. Her crew survived.
Mary	United Kingdom	The brig was wrecked on the Maplin Sand, in the North Sea off the coast of Essex. Her crew were rescued. She was on a voyage from Sunderland, County Durham to London.
Odone	Italy	The barque was driven ashore and wrecked at Clovelly, Devon. All thirteen people on board were rescued by the Coastguard.
Oneida	United Kingdom	The brig was driven ashore and wrecked west of Langney Point, Sussex with the loss of three of her seven crew. She was on a voyage from Hull, Yorkshire to Trieste.
Pride of the Ganges	United Kingdom	The full-rigged ship ran aground on the Brake Sand. She was on a voyage from Callao, Peru to Dunkirk, Nord France. She was refloated but was driven ashore and wrecked at De Panne, West Flanders, Belgium.
Refuge	United Kingdom	The ship departed from Saint-Malo, Ille-et-Vilaine, France for Plymouth, Devon. No further trace, presumed foundered with the loss of all hands.
Reliance	United Kingdom	The schooner was driven ashore at Bideford, Devon with the loss of four of her crew. She was on a voyage from Looe, Cornwall to Appledore, Devon.
Sirena	Italy	The brig was wrecked on the Tongue Sand. Her crew were rescued by the tug John Bull (United Kingdom). Sirena was on a voyage from Barletta to London, United Kingdom.
Telegram	Denmark	The ship was wrecked near "Wornpor". Her crew were rescued.
Unity	United Kingdom	The sloop was driven ashore and wrecked at Margate, Kent. Her crew were rescued by the Coastguard.
Victoria	United Kingdom	The ship was driven ashore Trevose Head, Cornwall. Her seven crew were rescued by rocket apparatus. She was on a voyage from Plymouth to Cádiz, Spain.
Violet	United Kingdom	The ship departed from Waterford for Gloucester. No further trace, presumed foundered with the loss of all hands.
Unnamed	France	The lugger ran aground on the Doom Bar. Her crew were rescued by the Padstow Lifeboat Albert Edward ( Royal National Lifeboat Institution).

== 13 September ==
List of shipwrecks: 13 September 1869
Ship	State	Description
Ajax	United Kingdom	The yacht was wrecked at Ryde, Isle of Wight.
Amanda	United Kingdom	The ship was driven ashore and wrecked near Aggermunde, Denmark. Her crew were rescued. She was on a voyage from Bo'ness, Lothian to Rendsburg, Prussia.
Argo	Prussia	The barque was driven ashore and severely damaged between Portishead, Somerset, United Kingdom and the mouth of the River Avon. She was on a voyage from Danzig to Gloucester, United Kingdom.
Arthur	Prussia	The barque was driven ashore between Portishead and the mouth of the River Avon. She was on a voyage from Danzig to Gloucester. Arthur was refloated on 19 September and resumed her voyage in a waterlogged condition.
Asia	United Kingdom	The ship was wrecked in Ramsey Sound.
Avonmore	United Kingdom	The barque was driven ashore and wrecked at Morwenstow, Cornwall with the loss of seven of her 22 crew. Survivors were rescued by the Coastguard using rocket apparatus. She was on a voyage from Cardiff, Glamorgan to Montevideo, Uruguay.
Becton	United Kingdom	The steamship was driven ashore at Missolonghi, Greece. she was on a voyage from Patras, Greece to London. She had been refloated by 15 September with assistance from HMS Rapid (Royal Navy) and resumed her voyage.
Bella	United Kingdom	The ship capsized and sank in the River Suir. She was refloated on 21 September and taken in to Waterford.
Betsey	United Kingdom	The Mersey Flat was wrecked on the North Bank, in Liverpool Bay. All three people on board were rescued by the shrimp boat Industry (United Kingdom).
Bradford	United Kingdom	The ship sprang a leak and was abandoned of the coast of Spain, according to a message in a bottle discovered off Cape Finisterre.
Caravan	United Kingdom	The barque was driven ashore and wrecked between Portishead and the mouth of the River Avon with the loss of a crew member. She was on a voyage from Sombrero, Antigua to Gloucester.
Casilda	United States	The ship was driven ashore on the Swash. She was on a voyage from Bristol, Gloucestershire, United Kingdom to New York.
Catherine and Jane, or Jane and Catherine	United Kingdom	The schooner was wrecked in Ramsey Sound. Her crew survived.
Creusa	United Kingdom	The yacht was driven ashore at Cherbourg, Seine-Inférieure, France. All on board were rescued. She was on a voyage from Dieppe, Seine-Inférieure to Fowey, Cornwall. Creusa was refloated on 19 September and taken in to Cherbourg, where she was condemned.
Dart	United Kingdom	The schooner foundered off Lee Bay, Devon with the loss of all hands, about ten lives.
Eneid	United Kingdom	The yacht was abandoned off Ryde. Her three crew were rescued by the Ryde Lifeboat Captain Hans Busk ( Royal National Lifeboat Institution). Eneid was subsequently wrecked.
Excelsior	United Kingdom	The ship was driven ashore at Bristol. She was on a voyage from Havana, Cuba to Bristol.
Fantee	United Kingdom	The ship ran aground at Bristol. She was on a voyage from Charlestown, Cornwall to Bristol.
Fenella	United Kingdom	The steam launch was wrecked at Ryde.
Glenhaven	United Kingdom	The ship was run ashore in the Swash. She was on a voyage from Cardiff to Aden. She was refloated on 19 September.
Her Royal Highness, and Rowena	United Kingdom	The full-rigged ship Her Royal Highness was run into by the full-rigged ship Rowena and then ran aground on the Dumball, in the Bristol Channel. She was on a voyage from Callao, Peru to Bristol. She was refloated on 19 September and taken in to Bristol. Rowena was on a voyage from the Clyde to Aden. She was severely damaged and run aground on the Dumball. She was refloated on 19 September and taken in to Bristol.
Hope	France	The barque was driven ashore at Penarth, Glamorgan.
Hope	United Kingdom	The barque was run ashore in the Swash. She was a voyage from Bristol to Quebec City, Canada.
Hope	United Kingdom	The ship was driven ashore at Milford Haven, Pembrokeshire. She was on a voyage from Llanelly, Glamorgan to Drogheda, County Louth. She was refloated on 19 September.
Lady Wodehouse	United Kingdom	The steamship caught fire in the English Channel off Folkestone, Kent. She was on a voyage from the River Thames to Dublin. The fire was extinguished and she put in to Portsmouth, Hampshire.
Mary	United Kingdom	The brig was abandoned in the English Channel off the coast of Cornwall. Her crew were rescued by the Cadgwith Lifeboat Western Commercial Traveller ( Royal National Lifeboat Institution).
Mary E. Campbell	United Kingdom	The ship foundered in the Bristol Channel 40 nautical miles (74 km) west of Lundy Island, Devon. Seven of her crew were reported missing; the rest were rescued by Jessie Forrest (United Kingdom). Mary E. Campbell was on a voyage from Liverpool, Lancashire to Aden.
Minnicoy	United Kingdom	The yacht foundered at Weston-super-Mare, Somerset.
Mystic Tie	Canada	The ship was driven ashore at Bristol. She was on a voyage from New York to Bristol.
Ocean	United Kingdom	The sloop sank off Lowestoft, Suffolk. Her crew survived. She was on a voyage from Rochester, Kent to Sunderland, County Durham.
Old Forager	United Kingdom	The tug was wrecked at Bristol with the loss of her captain.
Ondine	United Kingdom	The yacht was abandoned off Ryde. All three people on board were rescued by the Ryde Lifeboat Captain Hans Busk ( Royal National Lifeboat Institution).
Paragon	United Kingdom	The barque was driven ashore and wrecked at Berck-sur-Mer, Pas-de-Calais, France with the loss of nine of her eleven crew. She was on a voyage from Almeria, Spain to South Shields, County Durham.
Silistria	United Kingdom	The ship was driven ashore at the mouth of the River Avon.
Spray	United Kingdom	The yacht was severely damaged at Weston-super-Mare.
Wilhelmina	Netherlands	The ship ran aground on the Makkummerwaard. She was on a voyage from Amsterdam, North Holland to Peterhead, Aberdeenshire, United Kingdom.
No. 5	United Kingdom	The ship was driven ashore between Portishead and the mouth of the River Avon. She was on a voyage from Miramichi, New Brunswick, Canada to Gloucester.

== 14 September ==
List of shipwrecks: 14 September 1869
Ship	State	Description
Aid	United Kingdom	The brig was driven ashore and wrecked at Petten, North Holland, Netherlands. She was on a voyage from Schiedam, South Holland to Sunderland, County Durham.
Blossom	United Kingdom	The brig was driven ashore at Boscastle, Cornwall. All on board were rescued by the Coastguard using rocket apparatus.
Bonne Mère	France	The brig was wrecked at Boulogne, Pas-de-Calais. Her nine crew were rescued. She was on a voyage from Rio de Janeiro, Brazil to Havre de Grâce, Seine-Inférieure.
Courier du Havre	France	The ship was driven ashore at Cosqueville, Manche.
Europienne	Spain	The ship was driven ashore at Málaga. She was on a voyage from Gijón to Málaga.
Gallovidian	United Kingdom	The barque was driven ashore at Tara Point, County Down. She was on a voyage from the Clyde to Valparaíso, Chile. She was later refloated and taken in to Belfast, County Antrim, where she arrived on 27 September.
Gertrude	United Kingdom	The ship was driven ashore at Hellevoetsluis, Zeeland, Netherlands.
Harmony	United Kingdom	The collier was driven ashore and wrecked at Ambleteuse, Pas-de-Calais. Her crew were rescued. She was on a voyage from Havre de Grâce, Seine-Inférieure, France to Newcastle upon Tyne, Northumberland.
Hope	United Kingdom	The ship was driven ashore at Milford Haven, Pembrokeshire. She was on a voyage from Bristol to Gaspé, Quebec, Canada.
Idelia	Hamburg	The ship was wrecked in the Eider. She was on a voyage from Rio Grande to Hamburg.
Iloa	United Kingdom	The ship ran aground on the Dumball, in the Bristol Channel. She was on a voyage from Onega, Russia to Bristol, Gloucestershire. She was refloated on 19 September and taken in to Bristol.
Isabella	United Kingdom	The ship ran aground on the Doom Bar and sank. She was on a voyage from Saint-Malo, Ille-et-Vilaine, France to Swansea, Glamorgan.
Onward	United Kingdom	The ship was driven ashore at Cardiff, Glamorgan. She was on a voyage from Cardiff to Savannah, Georgia, United States. She was refloated with assistance from the steamship Sea King (United Kingdom) and taken in to Cardiff for repairs.
Rabbeus	Prussia	The ship was wrecked at Dragør, Denmark. She was on a voyage from Konigsberg to Amsterdam, North Holland, Netherlands.
St. Petersburg	Russia	The steamship was driven ashore on Rodskaer. She was on a voyage from Newcastle upon Tyne to Lübeck
Wheatsheaf	(United Kingdom of Great Britain and Ireland) Guernsey	The collier was driven ashore and wrecked at Ambleteuse. Her crew were rescued. She was on a voyage from Sidmouth, Devon to the River Tyne.
Unnamed	Flag unknown	The schooner was driven ashore and wrecked at Ilfracombe, Devon with the loss of all hands.

== 15 September ==
List of shipwrecks: 15 September 1869
Ship	State	Description
A. Catherine	Denmark	The ship was driven ashore in the Zuyder Zee. She was on a voyage from Antwerp, Belgium to Copenhagen.
Aurora	United Kingdom	The ship ran aground at New York, United States. She was refloated and found to be leaky.
Caroline	Rostock	The ship was driven ashore at Wustrow, Grand Duchy of Mecklenburg-Schwerin. She was on a voyage from "Howacht" to an English port.
Cherub	United Kingdom	The fishing smack was driven ashore on Heligoland. She was refloated and taken in to Cuxhaven in a leaky condition.
Corneille David	Belgium	The ship was driven ashore at Antwerp.
Hartford	United Kingdom	The brig was driven ashore and wrecked at Bridlington, Yorkshire. She was on a voyage from Newcastle upon Tyne, Northumberland to London.
Hellenis	United Kingdom	The steamship ran aground on the Arklow Bank, in the Irish Sea off the coast of County Wicklow and sank. She was on a voyage from Naples, Italy to Dublin.
Ida	Wismar	The ship was driven ashore at Egmond aan Zee, North Holland, Netherlands. She was on a voyage from Wismar to Antwerp.
Phantom	United States	The steamboat was destroyed by a boiler explosion near Paducah, Kentucky with the loss of seven lives.

== 16 September ==
List of shipwrecks: 16 September 1869
Ship	State	Description
Bella Maria	Spain	The ship foundered in the North Sea off the coast of South Holland, Netherlands.
Britannia	United Kingdom	The schooner ran aground off Port Ellen, Islay. She was on a voyage from Glasgow, Renfrewshire to Ballina, County Mayo. She was refloated and taken in to Port Ellen in a leaky condition.
Federico	Italy	The barque was abandoned in the Atlantic Ocean. Her crew were rescued by the steamship Francoli (Spain).
Friends	United Kingdom	The ship collided with another vessel and foundered off Cromer, Norfolk with the loss of all hands.
Kong Sverre	Sweden	The ship was beached near Portishead, Somerset, United Kingdom.
Scotia	United Kingdom	The ship ran aground on the Conger Rocks, in the Bristol Channel and sank.
St. Louis	France	The brig was run down and sunk off the mouth of the River Tees by the steamship Black Diamond (United Kingdom). Her eight crew were rescued by Black Diamond. St. Louis was on a voyage voom Brest, Finistère to Sunderland, County Durham, United Kingdom.

== 17 September ==
List of shipwrecks: 17 September 1869
Ship	State	Description
Bulldog	United Kingdom	The tug ran aground on the Black Rock, in the Sound of Islay and was wrecked. She was on a voyage from South Shields, County Durham to Dublin.
Elizabeth and Ann	United Kingdom	The ship sank in the North Sea off Southwold, Suffolk. Her crew were rescued. She was on a voyage from Hartlepool, County Durham to Hastings, Sussex.
Emma	United Kingdom	The ship was towed in to Lillesand, Norway in a waterlogged condition. She was on a voyage from Sundsvall, Sweden to London.
Excelsior	United States	The ship was abandoned on the Atlantic Ocean. Her crew were rescued. She was on a voyage from New York to Fécamp, Seine-Inférieure, France
Golden Eagle	United Kingdom	The ship ran aground at Ramsgate, Kent. She was on a voyage from Havre de Grâce, Seine-Inférieure, France to Liverpool, Lancashire.
Scotia	United Kingdom	The tug ran aground and sank in the Bristol Channel.

== 18 September ==
List of shipwrecks: 18 September 1869
Ship	State	Description
Contest	United Kingdom	The schooner was driven ashore on Inishbofin, County Donegal.
Marguerite	France	The barque was abandoned in the Atlantic Ocean. Her crew were rescued by the barque South-eastern (United Kingdom). Marguerite was on a voyage from La Guaira, Venezuela to Bordeaux, Gironde.

== 19 September ==
List of shipwrecks: 19 September 1869
Ship	State	Description
Amersham	United Kingdom	The barque was wrecked at Struys Point, Cape Colony. Her crew were rescued. She was on a voyage from Basseine, India to Queenstown, County Cork.
Amwell	United Kingdom	The brig ran aground on the Cutler Sand, in the North Sea off the coast of Suffolk. She was refloated and taken in to Harwich, Essex in a leaky condition.
Ann	United Kingdom	The ship foundered in the North Sea 20 nautical miles (37 km) north west of Texel, North Holland, Netherlands. Her crew were rescued. She was on a voyage from South Shields, County Durham to the Nieuw Diep.
Ann Fleming	United Kingdom	The ship ran aground on the Brake Sand. She was on a voyage from Newcastle upon Tyne, Northumberland to Ramsgate, Kent. She was refloated and taken in to Ramsgate in a leaky condition.
Argali	United Kingdom	The barque was driven ashore and wrecked in Algoa Bay. Her crew were rescued.
Brilliant	United Kingdom	The schooner was destroyed by fire. Her crew survived. She was on a voyage from Larne, County Antrim to Dunoon, Argyllshire.
Cadette	United Kingdom	The barque ran aground on Ted's Bank, in the Irish Sea off Southport, Lancashire and was abandoned by her ten crew. She was on a voyage from Baie Verte, New Brunswick, Canada to Liverpool, Lancashire. Cedette was refloated on 22 September and beached at Southport.
Duke of Bucchleuch	United Kingdom	The brig was driven ashore and wrecked in Algoa Bay. Her crew were rescued. She subsequently floated off and was taken in to Cape Town for repairs.
England	United Kingdom	The barque was driven ashore and wrecked in Algoa Bay. Her crew were rescued.
Fingoe	United Kingdom	The barque was driven ashore and damaged in Algoa Bay. Her crew were rescued. She had been refloated by 29 October and taken in to Port Elizabeth, Cape Colony for repairs.
Flash	United Kingdom	The brigantine was driven ashore and wrecked in Algoa Bay. Her crew were rescued.
Forres	United Kingdom	The barque was driven ashore and wrecked in Algoa Bay. Her crew were rescued. She subsequently floated off by as driven ashore again and was a total loss.
Gustaff	Sweden	The brig was driven ashore and wrecked in Algoa Bay. Her crew were rescued.
Jacob Hatfield	United States	The ship was abandoned in the Atlantic Ocean. Her crew were rescued by British Queen (United Kingdom).
James Hackett	United Kingdom	The schooner sprang a leak and was abandoned off Great Orme Head, Caernarfonshire. Her crew were rescued by the tug Knight Templar (United Kingdom). James Hackett was on a voyage from Newport, Monmouthshire to Cork. She subsequently came ashore at Formby, Lancashire
James Rankine	United Kingdom	The steamship ran aground in the River Carron and was then run into the steamship Greata (United Kingdom). James Rankine was on a voyage from Grangemouth, Stirlingshire to Rotterdam, South Holland, Netherlands. She was refloated and put back to Grangemouth.
Jeanne	France	The barque was driven ashore and wrecked in Algoa Bay. Her crew were rescued. She had been refloated by 19 October.
Louise	United Kingdom	The ship was driven ashore at Gravelines, Nord, France.
Major von Safft	Flag unknown	The barque was driven ashore and wrecked in Algoa Bay. Her crew were rescued. She had been refloated by 19 October.
Phare	United Kingdom	The ship was driven ashore at Lowestoft, Suffolk. She was on a voyage from Sunderland, County Durham to Lowestoft. She was refloated and taken in to Lowestoft.
Sarah Black	United Kingdom	The barque was driven ashore and wrecked in Algoa Bay. Her crew were rescued.
Sea Snake	Norway	The barque was driven ashore and wrecked in Algoa Bay with the loss of eight of her crew.
Thecla	Netherlands	The brigantine was wrecked off Castle Island, Bermuda. She was on a voyage from Saint Domingo to Falmouth, Cornwall, United Kingdom.
Tynemouth	United Kingdom	The steamship was wrecked on Fårö, Sweden. She was on a voyage from Kronstadt, Russia to London.

== 20 September ==
List of shipwrecks: 20 September 1869
Ship	State	Description
Anne	United Kingdom	The fishing smack foundered in the North Sea off Lowestoft, Suffolk.
Flower of Milford	United Kingdom	The ship was wrecked at Strumble Head, Pembrokeshire. Her crew were rescued. She was on a voyage from Fishguard to Saundersfoot.
Mary	United Kingdom	The schooner was abandoned off the Dudgeon Sandbank, in the North Sea. Her crew were rescued. she was on a voyage from Newcastle upon Tyne, Northumberland to Wells-next-the-Sea, Norfolk.
Savannah la Mar	United Kingdom	The brig was driven ashore on Skagen, Denmark and capsized. Her crew were rescued. She was on a voyage from Kronstadt, Russia to London.

== 21 September ==
List of shipwrecks: 21 September 1869
Ship	State	Description
Affo	United Kingdom	The brig was driven ashore and wrecked near Newquay, Cornwall. Her crew were rescued.
Bigarrena	Spain	The ship was wrecked on the Dutch coast. she was on a voyage from Havana, Cuba to Antwerp, Belgium.
Cartsburn	United Kingdom	The ship ran aground in the Hooghly River. She was refloated.
Eastern Empire	United Kingdom	The ship was sighted in the Strait of Sunda whilst on a voyage from Cardiff, Glamorgan to Yokohama, Japan. No further trace, presumed foundered with the loss of all hands.
Hope	United Kingdom	The ship was driven ashore at Burnham-on-Sea, Somerset.
Jessamine	United Kingdom	The brig collided with Florence Nightingale (United Kingdom) and sank off the Mouse Lightship ( Trinity House). Jessamine was on a voyage from Sunderland, County Durham to London.
Kongsberg	Sweden	The ship was wrecked on the Horn Reef. Her crew were rescued. She was on a voyage from Uddevalla to London, United Kingdom.
Mary	United Kingdom	The ship was abandoned in the North Sea. She was taken in to Great Yarmouth, Norfolk.
Moderation	United Kingdom	The ship was abandoned off Cape Horn, Chile. Her crew were rescued by the barque Glencairn (United Kingdom). Moderation was on a voyage from Cardiff to San Francisco, United States.
Presto	Netherlands	The schooner ran aground at the mouth of the Rio Grande do Sul. She was on a voyage from the Rio Grande do Sul to the English Channel. She was refloated and put in to Bahia, Brazil in a leaky condition.
Prince Rupert	United Kingdom	The ship was driven ashore on the coast of Glamorgan. She was on a voyage from Swansea, Glamorgan to the Cape Verde Islands. She was refloated and taken in to Penarth, Glamorgan.
Prudence	United Kingdom	The ship was driven ashore at Steart, Somerset. Her crew were rescued by the Bridgwater Lifeboat. She was on a voyage from Newport, Monmouthshire to Bridgwater, Somerset.
Victoria	United Kingdom	The ship was driven ashore at St. Mawes, Cornwall. She was on a voyage from Swansea to Barcelona, Spain.

== 22 September ==
List of shipwrecks: 22 September 1869
Ship	State	Description
Affo	Denmark	The ship was driven ashore at Newquay, Cornwall, United Kingdom.
Concordia	United Kingdom	The brig ran aground in Morecambe Bay. She was on a voyage from Onega, Russia to Barrow-in-Furness, Lancashire. She was refloated the next day and taken in to Fleetwood, Lancashire in a waterlogged condition.
Heinrich	Flag unknown	The ship ran aground on the Blanort Sand. She was on a voyage from Newcastle upon Tyne, Northumberland, United Kingdom to "Meidorf".
Hope	United Kingdom	The ship was driven ashore at Burnham-on-Sea, Somerset.
Prudence	United Kingdom	The ship was driven ashore on "Heart Island". She was on a voyage from Newport, Monmouthshire to Bridgwater, Somerset.
Wave	United Kingdom	The ship sprang a leak and was beached at Lamlash, Isle of Arran. She was refloated and towed in to Ardrossan, Ayrshire in a sinking condition.

== 23 September ==
List of shipwrecks: 23 September 1869
Ship	State	Description
Commissary	United Kingdom	The ship was driven ashore. She was on a voyage from Liverpool, Lancashire to Port Said, Egypt. She was refloated and put back to Liverpool.
Margaret	United Kingdom	The ship struck a sunken wreck off Hastings, Sussex. She was on a voyage from Sunderland, County Durham to Exeter, Devon. She put in to Dover, Kent in a leaky condition.
Margaret Bruce	United Kingdom	The schooner struck rocks off Eartholmen, Denmark and sank.
Ocean Wave	United States	The scow schooner sank without loss of life in Lake Michigan off Door County, Wisconsin, during a storm.
Sphynx	United Kingdom	The ship was severely damaged by fire at South Shields, County Durham.
St. Marc	France	The fishing lugger was run down and sunk off the mouth of the Humber by the steamship St. Quintin (Italy). Her nineteen crew were rescued by St. Quintin.
Thomasine	United Kingdom	The full-rigged ship was driven ashore at Hellevoetsluis, Zeeland, Netherlands. Her crew were rescued. She was on a voyage from Warkworth, Northumberland to Rotterdam, South Holland, Netherlands.
Vere	United Kingdom	The brig foundered in the Bristol Channel off Lundy Island, Devon.. Her crew were rescued.

== 24 September ==
List of shipwrecks: 24 September 1869
Ship	State	Description
Activ	Danzig	The yacht was driven ashore near "Fairwater". Her crew were rescued. She was on a voyage from Peterhead, Aberdeenshire, United Kingdom to Danzig.
Anna	Bremen	The ship sank near Saint Petersburg, Russia. She was on a voyage from Bremen to Saint Petersburg.
Kinloch	United Kingdom	The brig was driven ashore 2 nautical miles (3.7 km) north of Ardrossan, Ayrshire. Her crew were rescued. She was on a voyage from Ardrossan to Dublin.
Sainte Marie	France	The lugger was run down and sunk in the North Sea off the mouth of the Humber by the steamship St. Quintie (Italy). Her crew were rescued.
Sirius	Netherlands	The ship sank off the mouth of the Elbe. She was on a voyage from Saint Petersburg to Dordrecht.
Trade Wind	United States	The steamship foundered in the Gulf of Mexico with the loss of a crew member. Survivors took to four boats. Those in two of the boats were rescued by the steamship Clinton (United States) with the loss of one life; those in the others reached safety. Trade Wind was on a voyage from New Orleans, Louisiana to Belize City, British Guiana.

== 25 September ==
List of shipwrecks: 25 September 1869
Ship	State	Description
Bud	United Kingdom	The sloop sank off Landunvez, Finistère, France. She was on a voyage from Newport, Monmouthshire to Brest, Finistère.
Empress	Canada.	The barque ran aground on Taylor's Bank, in Liverpool Bay and was wrecked. All eighteen people on board were rescued by the New Brighton Lifeboat Willie and Arthur ( Royal National Lifeboat Institution). Empress was on a voyage from Liverpool, Lancashire, United Kingdom to Prince Edward Island.
Helen	United Kingdom	The ship ran aground at Penarth, Glamorgan. She was on a voyage from Newport, Monmouthshire to Plymouth, Devon. She was run into by the schooner Harmony (United Kingdom).
Mary	United Kingdom	The Thames barge capsized in the River Thames at Blackwall, Middlesex. Her crew were rescued.
Pembroke	United Kingdom	The schooner was driven ashore on Puffin Island, Anglesey. She was on a voyage from Fowey, Cornwall to Runcorn, Cheshire.
Shooting Star	United Kingdom	The ship was abandoned in the Bristol Channel. She was on a voyage from Llanelly, Glamorgan to Southampton, Hampshire. She came ashore on the Towyn Sands.
Stork	United Kingdom	The steamship ran aground on the Barrow Sand, in the Thames Estuary.
Strathspey	United Kingdom	The barque foundered off McCloud's Island, in the Pacific Ocean. Her crew took to the longboat; they were rescued a week later. She was on a voyage from San Francisco, California, United States to Queenstown, County Cork.

== 26 September ==
List of shipwrecks: 26 September 1869
Ship	State	Description
Anna Maria	United Kingdom	The brig foundered. Seven people were rescued, four were reported missing. She was on a voyage from the River Clyde to Valparaíso, Chile.
Bebside	United Kingdom	The ship steamship was damaged by and onboard explosion at Great Yarmouth, Norfolk.
Conquest	United Kingdom	The paddle tug struck the breakwater at Great Yarmouth, Norfolk and was severely damaged.
Electric Spark	United States	The full-rigged ship was wrecked on the Connybeg Rock, in the Irish Sea off the coast of County Wexford, United Kingdom. Her crew were rescued by a lifeboat. She was on a voyage from Liverpool, Lancashire, United Kingdom to San Francisco, California.
Irvine	United Kingdom	The barque was driven ashore and wrecked at Arranmore, County Donegal.
Izaac Walton	United States	The fishing schooner was sunk in a collision with schooner William Babson. Crew saved.
Sarah and Ann	United Kingdom	The schooner was driven ashore and wrecked at Eyemouth, Berwickshire. Her crew were rescued. She was on a voyage from London to Eyemouth.
Sarah Elizabeth	United Kingdom	The ship foundered off Reighton, Yorkshire. Her crew were rescued. She was on a voyage from King's Lynn, Norfolk to Leith, Lothian.

== 27 September ==
List of shipwrecks: 27 September 1869
Ship	State	Description
Bessie Stanton	United Kingdom	The barque was wrecked at the mouth of the River Plate. She was on a voyage from Cardiff, Glamorgan to Montevideo, Uruguay.
Corunna	United Kingdom	The ship was driven ashore near Grasgard, Öland. She was on a voyage from Sandarne to Hartlepool, County Durham, United Kingdom.
David	United Kingdom	The brig was wrecked in the North Sea 80 nautical miles (150 km) off Flamborough Head, Yorkshire. Her crew were rescued. She was on a voyage from Gävle, Sweden to West Hartlepool, County Durham. David was subsequently taken in to by the smack Cambria (United Kingdom).
Defender	United Kingdom	The barque was driven ashore south of Helsingborg, Sweden.
Devonport	United Kingdom	The full-rigged ship struck a reef off Natuna Besar, Netherlands East Indies and was beached. She was on a voyage from London to Shanghai, China.
Maythorn	United Kingdom	The ship was driven ashore and wrecked on Sheep Island, Argyllshire. Her crew were rescued. She was on a voyage from Liverpool. Lancashire to New York, United States.
Minstrel Boy	Norway	The ship was lost near Lemvig, Denmark. She was on a voyage from Stockvik, Sweden to Dover, Kent, United Kingdom.
Northwick	United Kingdom	The steamship foundered in the North Sea. Her 21 crew took to tow lifeboats. Five crew in one of the lifeboats were rescued by Hopper (Sweden); the other sixteen crew landed at Berwick upon Tweed, Northumberland. Northwick was on a voyage from the River Tyne to Kronstadt, Russia.
Numa	Italy	The derelict barque was towed in to Swansea, Glamorgan, United Kingdom.

== 28 September ==
List of shipwrecks: 28 September 1869
Ship	State	Description
Annie M. Cann	United States	The ship was driven ashore at Thomas Point, Maryland. She was on a voyage from Baltimore, Maryland to Dublin, United Kingdom. She was refloated the next day and taken in to Annapolis, Maryland.
Ariel	Italy	The schooner was destroyed by fire at Bordeaux, Gironde, France.
Arthur H. Goodwin	United Kingdom	The ship was lost in the "Allas Strait". She was on a voyage from Mauritius to Sandalwood Island.
Bordelaise	France	The ship was damaged by fire at Bordeaux.
Charlemagne	France	The ship was destroyed by fire at Bordeaux.
Charlotte	France	The ship was destroyed by fire at Bordeaux.
Chimiste	France	The ship was destroyed by fire at Bordeaux.
Cirestine	France	The ship was destroyed by fire at Bordeaux.
Chomin	Spain	The brig was destroyed by fire at Bordeaux.
Confiance	France	The ship was damaged by fire at Bordeaux.
Costa Rica	France	The ship was damaged by fire at Bordeaux.
Crizava	Mexico	The ship was destroyed by fire at Bordeaux.
Falcon	United Kingdom	The brig caught fire off Gotland, Sweden. She was run ashore at Fahludd Point and was burnt out. Her crew survived.
Formose	United Kingdom	The ship was damaged by fire at Bordeaux.
Guipazcoano	Spain	The ship was damaged by fire at Bordeaux.
Harmonia	United Kingdom	The abandoned ship was driven ashore and wrecked on Wiay, Outer Hebrides. She was on a voyage from Quebec City, Canada to Aberdeen.
Harmonie	France	The ship was destroyed by fire at Bordeaux.
J. B. D.	France	The ship was damaged by fire at Bordeaux.
Jeune France	France	The ship was destroyed by fire at Bordeaux.
Josephine Marie	France	The ship was severely damaged by fire at Bordeaux.
Léon	France	The ship was severely damaged by fire at Bordeaux.
Lieutenant Bellot	France	The ship was destroyed by fire at Bordeaux.
Lormont	France	The ship was severely damaged by fire at Bordeaux.
Maas	Netherlands	The steamship ran aground on the Schulpenplaat, off Maassluis, South Holland. She was on a voyage from Brielle, London, United Kingdom. She was refloated on 1 October and taken in to Hellevoetsluis, Zeeland.
Maréchal Pellisier	France	The ship was damaged by fire at Bordeaux.
Marguerite	France	The ship was damaged by fire at Bordeaux.
Marie Christine	France	The ship was destroyed by fire at Bordeaux.
Mary	France	The ship was destroyed by fire at Bordeaux.
Moise	France	The ship was destroyed by fire at Bordeaux.
Niger	France	The ship was damaged by fire at Bordeaux.
Orissa	United Kingdom	The ship caught fire and was abandoned in the Atlantic Ocean. Her crew were rescued by Decapolis (United Kingdom). Orissa was on a voyage from the Clyde to Mauritius.
Orizava	France	The ship was destroyed by fire at Bordeaux.
Panama	France	The ship was destroyed by fire at Bordeaux.
Pionnier	France	The ship was destroyed by fire at Bordeaux.
Podensac	France	The ship was damaged by fire at Bordeaux.
Prince Consort	United Kingdom	The ship ran aground on the Bouline Rocks. She was on a voyage from Arkhangelsk, Russia to London. She was refloated and taken in to Newcastle upon Tyne, Northumberland in a leaky condition.
Progress	Norway	The schooner was destroyed by fire at Bordeaux.
Scoter	United Kingdom	The steamship struck a submerged rock and sank in the River Plate off Montevideo, Uruguay. Her crew were rescued by an Imperial Brazilian Navy gunboat.
Souveraine	France	The ship was damaged by fire at Bordeaux.
Tourny	France	The ship was destroyed by fire at Bordeaux.
Ulysse	France	The ship was destroyed by fire at Bordeaux.
Unico	France	The ship was damaged by fire at Bordeaux.
Unnamed	France	The lighter, loaded with petroleum from the steamship Comte de Hainaut (Belgium) and the ship Der Fruhling (Prussia) caught fire and sank at Bordeaux. The burning petroleum was carried upstream on the tide and set fire to many other ships.

== 29 September ==
List of shipwrecks: 29 September 1869
Ship	State	Description
A. L. Palmer	Canada	The brig was abandoned in the Atlantic Ocean. Her crew were rescued by the steamship Westphalia (Hamburg). A. L. Palmer was on a voyage from Liverpool, Lancashire, United Kingdom to New York, United States. She was subsequently discovered by Melrose (United Kingdom), which put a skeleton crew on board.
Delphin	Hamburg	The ship ran aground at Sunderland, County Durham, United Kingdom. She was on a voyage from Hamburg to Sunderland. She was refloated and beached.
Guayaquil	Flag unknown	The steamship ran aground 18 nautical miles (33 km) south of San Antonio, Chile. She was refloated and taken in to Talcahuano, Chile.
Prince of Wales	United Kingdom	The steamship suffered a boiler explosion off the Bass Rock, in the Firth of Forth. Her passengers were taken off by a fishing boat. She was on an excursion from Stirling to the Bass Rock and back.

== 30 September ==
List of shipwrecks: 30 September 1869
Ship	State	Description
Attje Bouwers	Flag unknown	The ship foundered in the Kattegat. She was on a voyage from Leith, Lothian, United Kingdom to Narva, Russia.
Beau Monde	United Kingdom	The ship ran aground at "Wellegurnon". She was on a voyage from Newport, Monmouthshire to Buenos Aires, Argentina. She was refloated.
Bonny Lass	United Kingdom	The ship was driven ashore and wrecked at Saltburn-by-the-Sea, Yorkshire. She was on a voyage from Stettin to London.
Eagle	United States	The 336-ton whaling bark was wrecked in the Chukchi Sea on Sea Horse Shoal (70°53′N 158°42′W) off Point Franklin on the coast of the Department of Alaska. The vessel John Carver (United States) rescued her crew.
Eva	United Kingdom	The schooner was run into by a French schooner and sank in the English Channel 11 nautical miles (20 km) east of Berry Head, Devon. Her crew were rescued.
Ostsee	Flag unknown	The ship foundered in the North Sea. Her crew were rescued.
Randolph	United Kingdom	The barque struck The Mewstone, off the coast of Devon and foundered. She was on a voyage from Newport, Monmouthshire to Martinique.
Rusebank	Norway	The schooner was driven ashore at Kingsbarns, Fife, United Kingdom. Her crew were rescued.
Swan	(United Kingdom of Great Britain and Ireland) Isle of Man	The lugger was wrecked on Langness. Her eight crew survived. She was on a voyage from Derbyhaven to Douglas.
Wedlock	United Kingdom	The ship foundered in the North Sea. Her crew were rescued.

== Unknown date ==
List of shipwrecks: Unknown date in September 1869
Ship	State	Description
Aden	United Kingdom	The ship was wrecked near Maranhão, Empire of Brazil. She was on a voyage from Cardiff, Glamorgan to Maranhão.
Anna and Allen	United Kingdom	The barque was wrecked near the mouth of the Rio Grande. She was on a voyage from Glasgow, Renfrewshire to Valparaíso, Chile.
Appellina	United Kingdom	The brig was wrecked at Wijk aan Zee, North Holland, Netherlands between 12 and 14 September. She was on a voyage from China to Schiedam, South Holland, Netherlands.
Apprentice Boy	United States	Carrying a cargo of lumber, the 122.1-foot (37.2 m), 216.92-gross register ton two-masted schooner ran aground on the coast of Door County, Wisconsin, 15 miles (24 km) north of the Wolf River and was scuttled to prevent her from suffering further damage from pounding by the surf. Although declared a total loss within a month, she apparently eventually was refloated, repaired, and returned to service.
Beatitude	United Kingdom	The ship foundered off Sunderland, County Durham. Her crew were rescued by the brig Josephine (United Kingdom). Beatitude was on a voyage from Sunderland to Kronstadt, Russia.
Caspar	United Kingdom	The brig collided with another vessel and was abandoned in the Baltic Sea off Öland, Sweden before 26 September.
Catherine	United Kingdom	The brig was wrecked at Utsire, Norway before 13 September. Her crew survived.
Colombe	France	The brig was wrecked in the Zuid Beverland Kanaal near Hansweert, Zeeland, Netherlands between 12 and 14 September. Her crew were rescued. She was on a voyage from Spain to Antwerp, Belgium.
Dastre	United Kingdom	The barque was abandoned in the Atlantic Ocean before 18 September. She was on a voyage from Trinidad de Cuba, Cuba to Bristol, Gloucestershire.
Eliza and Jane	United Kingdom	The schooner struck a reef and was beached at Cabedelo, Brazil.
Eno	United Kingdom	The ship was wrecked on Cross Island before 12 September. She was on a voyage from Arkhangelsk, Russia to Sunderland.
Falcon	United Kingdom	The barque was wrecked near Niuzhuang, China before 18 September.
Fanny	United States	The ship collided with a British ship and sank in the Gulf of Saint Lawrence with the loss of two of her crew.
Florence	United Kingdom	The ship was driven ashore at Cape Henlopen, Delaware, United States. She was on a voyage from Kingston, Jamaica to Philadelphia, Pennsylvania, United States.
Hesperia	United Kingdom	The ship collided with another vessel and sank in the River Thames at Gravesend, Kent before 11 September.
Jeune Gerard	France	The fishing boat foundered in the North Sea off the Dutch coast between 12 and 14 September with the loss of eight crew.
L. J. Knight	United States	The abandoned and derelict ship was taken in to Newport, Virginia. She was on a voyage from Philadelphia to Salem, Massachusetts. It was discovered that three holes had been bored in her hull with an auger.
Margaret	United Kingdom	The ship was abandoned in the Saint Lawrence River in a waterlogged condition.
Mary	United Kingdom	The ship was driven ashore near Quebec City, Canada. Shew as on a voyage from Glasson Dock, Lancashire to Quebec City.
Mary	Denmark	The ship capsized at Manzanillo, Cuba and was wrecked.
Mayflower	United Kingdom	The ship foundered. She was on a voyage from Newcastle upon Tyne, Northumberland to Portland, Maine, United States.
Niger	France	The full-rigged ship was damaged by fire at Havre de Grâce before 29 September.
Ouangondy	India	The ship was driven ashore in the Sunda Strait. She was on a voyage from Bombay to Batavia, Netherlands East Indies.
Palmyra	United Kingdom	The ship was driven ashore at Miramichi, New Brunswick, Canada. She was consequently condemned.
Paragon	United Kingdom	The brig ran aground on the Indian Rocks, off Wood Island, Prince Edward Island, Canada before 15 September. She was on a voyage from Pugwash, Nova Scotia, Canada to Liverpool. She was consequently condemned.
Peg	United Kingdom	The brig foundered in the Bristol Channel off Lundy Island, Devon. Her crew were rescued.
Pia	United Kingdom	The ship was driven ashore in the Dardanelles. She was on a voyage from Taganrog, Russia to Falmouth, Cornwall. She was refloated.
Princess Royal	United Kingdom	The ship was driven ashore at Little Metis, Quebec, Canada before 25 September. She was on a voyage from Plymouth, Devon to Quebec City. She was later refloated.
Selim	United Kingdom	The barque was destroyed by fire in the Atlantic Ocean. Her crew were rescued by the barque Nederland (Netherlands).
Spartel	France	The barque was wrecked at Struy's Point, Cape Colony before 26 September with the loss of all hands.
Sphynx	United Kingdom	The ship was destroyed by fire. She was on a voyage from the River Tyne to Livorno, Italy.
Siren	United Kingdom	The brig was wrecked near Montevideo, Uruguay.
Thames	United Kingdom	The steamship was presumed to have foundered with the loss of all hands. She was on a voyage from Cardiff to Caen, Calvados.
Tigré	France	The steamship ran aground on a reef off Perim. She was refloated and resumed her voyage.
Unity	United Kingdom	The schooner foundered 20 nautical miles (37 km) off Cape Primer, Spain. Her crew were rescued. She was on a voyage from Pomaron, Portugal to Newcastle upon Tyne, Northumberland.
W. D. B.	United Kingdom	The brig capsized 12 nautical miles (22 km) south of Cape Elizabeth, Maine, United States. She was on a voyage from Boston, Massachusetts to Portland, Maine.
SMS Vulcano	Austro-Hungarian Navy	The corvette suffered a boiler explosion. Eleven crew were killed.
William and Helen	United Kingdom	The schooner was wrecked on the Gelb Sand, in the North Sea after 7 September. Her crew were rescued. She was on a voyage from Fraserburgh, Aberdeenshire to Harburg.
Unnamed	Flag unknown	The ship foundered in the North Sea off Hook of Holland, South Holland, Netherlands between 12 and 14 September.
