= List of shipwrecks in September 1857 =

The list of shipwrecks in September 1857 includes ships sunk, wrecked or otherwise lost during September 1857.

== 1 September ==
List of shipwrecks: 1 September 1857
Ship	State	Description
Palmaille	Hamburg	The barque was wrecked on the Porian Reef, at the mouth of the Bassein River. Her crew were rescued. She was on a voyage from Hamburg to Singapore, Straits Settlements.
Tyne	(United Kingdom of Great Britain and Ireland) British Guiana	The steamship was abandoned 20 nautical miles (37 km) west of Saint Vincent and foundered. Her crew survived. She was on a voyage from Demerara to Saint Vincent.

== 2 September ==
List of shipwrecks: 2 September 1857
Ship	State	Description
Ann	United Kingdom	The ship was driven ashore near Point of Ayre Lighthouse, Isle of Man.
Louisa	United Kingdom	The barque was driven ashore and wrecked at Tenerife, Canary Islands.

== 3 September ==
List of shipwrecks: 3 September 1857
Ship	State	Description
Flèche	France	The ship ran aground at Dunkirk, Nord. She was on a voyage from Marseille, Bouches-du-Rhône to Dunkirk.
Helena	United Kingdom	The ship was in collision with the barque Flavio (Flag unknown) and sank in the North Sea. Her crew were rescued by Flavio. Helena was on a voyage from Arkhangelsk, Russia to Dunkirk. France.
Laurel	United Kingdom	The brig ran aground and was wrecked at Rouen, Seine-Inférieure, France. Her crew were rescued by the Rouen Lifeboat. She was on a voyage from Newcastle upon Tyne, Northumberland to Dieppe, Seine-Inférieure. Also reported as being wrecked at Havre de Grâce, Seine-Inférieure and being on a voyage from South Shields. County Durham to Rouen.
Truth	United Kingdom	The schooner was in collision with the steamship Samuel Laing (United Kingdom) and sank in the North Sea off Cromer, Norfolk with the loss of all but one of her crew.

== 4 September ==
List of shipwrecks: 4 September 1857
Ship	State	Description
Adrian	United Kingdom	The brig foundered in the North Sea. Five crew were rescued by Hermann Theodore (Flag unknown), the rest by Albion (United Kingdom). Adrian was on a voyage from Newcastle upon Tyne, Northumberland to Kronstadt, Russia.
Aim	United Kingdom	The brig was driven ashore in a typhoon at Samson Bay, Formosa.
Confucius	United Kingdom	The full-rigged ship foundered in a typhoon off Swatow, China with the loss of 22 of her 40 crew. Survivors were rescued by Patria (Flag unknown).
Durance	French Navy	The transport ship was driven ashore on Deadman's Island, Shanghai, China in a typhoon.
Egypt	United Kingdom	The ship was wrecked on "Blohorm Island", Hong Kong in a typhoon with the loss of all but one of her crew. The survivor was rescued by Waverley (United Kingdom). Egypt was on a voyage from Hong Kong to Shanghai.
Eliza Jane	United Kingdom	The full-rigged ship was driven ashore and severely damaged in a typhoon at Samson Bay.
Fortuna	United Kingdom	The ship was wrecked on Formosa. Her crew survived.
Julia	United Kingdom	The ship was destroyed by fire at Amoy, China.
Melanie	United Kingdom	The barque was driven ashore and severely damaged in a typhoon at Samson Bay.
Nile	United Kingdom	The brig foundered in a typehoon at Samson Bay with the loss of all hands.
Owen	United Kingdom	The barque was abandoned in the Atlantic Ocean. Her crew were rescued by Algeria (United Kingdom). Owen was on a voyage from Waterford to Quebec City, Province of Canada, British North America.
Patriot	United Kingdom	The ship ran aground on the Newcombe Sand, in the North Sea off the coast of Norfolk. She was on a voyage from Liverpool, Lancashire to Great Yarmouth, Norfolk. She was refloated and taken in to Great Yarmouth in a leaky condition.
Rienzi	Belgium	The full-rigged ship ran aground on the Wellington Sandbank, in the North Sea. She was on a voyage from Callao, Peru to Antwerp. She was refloated and completed her voyage.
Vixen	United Kingdom	The schooner foundered in a typhoon at Samso Bay. Her crew were rescued.
Waverley	United Kingdom	The full-rigged ship was driven ashore in a typhoon at Samson Bay. She was later refloated.
Whampoa	United Kingdom	The full-rigged ship was driven ashore in a typhoon at Samson Bay. She was later refloated and taken in to Foo-Chow-Foo, China, where she arrived on 11 September.

== 5 September ==
List of shipwrecks: 5 September 1857
Ship	State	Description
Australasian League	(United Kingdom of Great Britain and Ireland) New South Wales	The schooner was driven ashore and wrecked at the mouth of the Richmond River.
Betsey	United Kingdom	The ship ran aground on the Capperies Bank, in the Bristol Channel. She was on a voyage from Cardiff, Glamorgan to Bideford, Devon. She was refloated and put in to Ilfracombe, Devon for repairs.
John	United Kingdom	The ship ran aground on the Newcombe Sand, in the North Sea off the coast of Norfolk. She was on a voyage from London to Goole, Yorkshire. She was refloated and taken in to Great Yarmouth, Norfolk in a leaky condition.
Ophid	United Kingdom	The ship ran aground in the River Tay and was damaged. She was on a voyage from Dundee, Forfarshire to Arkhangelsk, Russia. She was refloated on 7 September and taken in to Dundee.
Oxford	United Kingdom	The barque was driven ashore near "Hammermukle", Denmark. She was on a voyage from London to Sundsvall, Sweden. She was refloated the next day and taken in to Helsingør, Denmark.

== 6 September ==
List of shipwrecks: 6 September 1857
Ship	State	Description
Aerolite	United Kingdom	The ship was driven ashore in the Yangtze-kiang. She was on a voyage from London to Shanghai, China. She had been refloated by 6 November and towed in to Shanghai
Amity	United Kingdom	The ship ran aground on the Herd Sand, in the North Sea off the coast of County Durham. Her crew were rescued.
Harkaway	United States	The full-rigged ship caught fire in the Atlantic Ocean. Her passengers were put in the ship's boats. She was abandoned the next day; Her ten passengers and ten of her crew were rescued by the barque Sarah and Dorothy (United Kingdom). The remaining seven crew were rescued on 9 September by the barque Advice (United Kingdom). Harkaway was on a voyage from Charleston, South Carolina to Liverpool, Lancashire, United Kingdom.
Kroonprinses Louise Kuhn	Netherlands	The steamship was driven ashore on Saaremaa, Russia. She was on a voyage from Amsterdam to Saint Petersburg, Russia.
Rosalie	United States	The barque was wrecked on Seal Island, Nova Scotia, British North America. She was on a voyage from Boston, Massachusetts to Sydney, New South Wales.

== 7 September ==
List of shipwrecks: 7 September 1857
Ship	State	Description
Albert	France	The steamship collided with Chanticleer (Flag unknown) and sank off the Three Crown Battery, Copenhagen, Denmark. All on board were rescued. She was on a voyage from Dunkirk, Nord to Saint Petersburg, Russia
East Anglian	United Kingdom	The steamship was driven ashore at Terneuzen, Zeeland, Netherlands. She was on a voyage from London to Antwerp, Belgium. She was refloated the next day and resumed her voyage.
Lady Ridley	United Kingdom	The ship was run into by the steamship Rouen (France) and sank at South Shields, County Durham. Her crew were rescued.
Monte Christo	United Kingdom	The brigantine sprang a leak and was run ashore at "Newfrage", Prince Edward Islands, British North America, where she was wrecked. She was on a voyage from Miramichi, New Brunswick, British North America to Queenstown, County Cork.

== 8 September ==
List of shipwrecks: 8 September 1857
Ship	State	Description
Fenus	Kingdom of Hanover	The galiot foundered in the North Sea. Her crew were rescued by the fishing boat Jonge Neeltje (Netherlands). Fenus was on a voyage from Alloa, Clackmannanshire, United Kingdom to Varel.
John Dalton	United Kingdom	The ship sank in the Hooghly River. She was on a voyage from Calcutta, India to London.
Providence	United Kingdom	The sloop was driven ashore at Cairnbulg, Aberdeenshire. She was on a voyage from Portmadoc, Caernarfonshire to Dundee, Forfarshire.
Rajah	India	The ship sank on the Diamond Sand, in the Hooghly River. She was on a voyage from London to Calcutta.

== 9 September ==
List of shipwrecks: 9 September 1857
Ship	State	Description
Corzo	Spain	The ship ran aground on Scroby Sands, Norfolk, United Kingdom. She was on a voyage from Bergen, Norway to Bilbao. She was refloated and taken in to Great Yarmouth, Norfolk in a leaky condition.
Donna Thereza	Portugal	The brigantine sprang a leak and was beached at Lisbon. She was on a voyage from Swansea, Glamorgan, United Kingdom to Marseille, Bouches-du-Rhône, France.
James Magnet	United Kingdom	The brig ran aground on the Holm Sand, in the North Sea off the coast of Norfolk. She was on a voyage from London to Newcastle upon Tyne, Northumberland. She was refloated.

== 10 September ==
List of shipwrecks: 10 September 1857
Ship	State	Description
Henrietta Sophia	United Kingdom	The ship ran aground on the Holm Sand, in the North Sea off the coast of Suffolk. She was on a voyage from Danzig to London. She was refloated the next day and was taken in to Lowestoft, Suffolk.
John Thomas Bell	United Kingdom	The barque was abandoned in the North Sea 80 to 90 nautical miles (150 to 170 km) off Lindesnes, Norway. Her crew were rescued by Albert (Norway). John Thomas Bell was on a voyage from Newcastle upon Tyne, Northumberland to Copenhagen, Denmark.
Namoa	United Kingdom	The ship was lost on the coast of China.
Unidentified schooner	Unknown	The schooner was burned by the brig-sloop HMS Sappho (Royal Navy) while preparing to load slaves in West Africa.

== 11 September ==
List of shipwrecks: 11 September 1857
Ship	State	Description
Ann Hazell	United Kingdom	The brig was driven ashore on Naissaar, Russia. She was on a voyage from Newcastle upon Tyne, Northumberland to Narva, Russia. She was refloated.
Central America	United States	Central America. The sidewheel paddle steamer sprang a leak during a hurricane. She foundered in the Atlantic Ocean (31°35′N 77°02′W) with the loss of 425 of the 631 people on board. Survivors were rescued by the barque Ellen (Norway) and the brig Marine (United States). Central America was on a voyage from Colón, Republic of New Granada to New York.
Elizabeth	United Kingdom	The brig was abandoned in the North Sea 70 nautical miles (130 km) west of Heligoland. Her crew were rescued by the galiot Johannes (Denmark). Elizabeth was on a voyage from Sunderland, County Durham to Hamburg.
Florence	United Kingdom	The ship departed from Halifax, Nova Scotia for San Juan, Puerto Rico. No further trace, presumed foundered with the loss of all hands.
Ide	United Kingdom	The ship was wrecked at Red Bay Labrador, British North America.
Louise	United Kingdom	The barque was driven ashore and wrecked on the Levant coast.
Mary Ann	(United Kingdom of Great Britain and Ireland) British North America	The schooner was wrecked at Red Bay.
Quickstep	(United Kingdom of Great Britain and Ireland) British North America	The schooner was wreecked at Red Bay.
Secret	United Kingdom	The brig ran aground on the Longsand, in the North Sea off the coast of Essex. Her crew were rescued. She was on a voyage from Sunderland, County Durham to Barcelona, Spainh.
Sophie	Netherlands	The steamship collided with the steamship William Hutt (United Kingdom) and foundered in the English Channel off Dungeness, Kent, United Kingdom with the loss of thirteen of the 24 people on board. Sophie was on a voyage from Rotterdam, South Holland to Bristol, Gloucestershire, United Kingdom.
Temperance	(United Kingdom of Great Britain and Ireland) British North America	The ship was wrecked at Red Bay and was plundered by the local inhabitants.
Vitula	(United Kingdom of Great Britain and Ireland) British North America	The brig was wrecked at Red Bay.
Western Boat	(United Kingdom of Great Britain and Ireland) British North America	The schooner was wrecked at Red Bay.

== 12 September ==
List of shipwrecks: 12 September 1857
Ship	State	Description
Albertine	France	The schooner was wrecked on the Haisborough Sands, in the North Sea off the coast of Norfolk, United Kingdom. Her crew were rescued. She was on a voyage from Newcastle upon Tyne or Blyth, Northumberland, United Kingdom to Nantes, Loire-Inférieure.
Alliance	France	The barque was abandoned in the Atlantic Ocean. Her crew were rescued by Sabrina (United Kingdom). Alliance was on a voyage from British Honduras to Havre de Grâce, Seine-Inférieure.
Eliza	United Kingdom	The brig foundered in the Atlantic Ocean 25 nautical miles (46 km) off Ribadeo, Spain. Her crew were rescued. She was on a voyage from South Shields, County Durham to Lisbon, Portugal.

== 13 September ==
List of shipwrecks: 13 September 1857
Ship	State	Description
Britannia	United Kingdom	The barque collided with the barque St. Marthe (France) and sank 160 nautical miles (300 km) west of Ouessant, Finistère, France with the loss of four of her crew. She was on a voyage from Liverpool, Lancashire to Buenos Aires, Argentina.
Colin McRae	United States	The barque was wrecked at Wilmington, North Carolina. Her crew were rescued. She was on a voyage from Liverpool to Wilmington.
Fusilier	United Kingdom	The full-rigged ship was driven ashore in Big Bull Slaughter Bay, near St. Govan's Head, Pembrokeshire. Her crew were rescued. She was on a voyage from Valparaíso, Chile to Liverpool.
Luzon	Spain	The ship was driven ashore and wrecked in the New Topsail Inlet. She was on a voyage from Havana, Cuba to Falmouth, Cornwall, United Kingdom.
Messenger	United Kingdom	The ship ran aground in the River Mersey. She was on a voyage from Liverpool to Melbourne, Victoria.
Penang	(United Kingdom of Great Britain and Ireland) Straits Settlements	The ship was struck by a waterspout and sank with the loss of 38 of the 65 people on board. She was on a voyage from Singapore to Malacca and Penang.
Polly	(United Kingdom of Great Britain and Ireland) New Zealand	The schooner was wrecked at New Plymouth. All on board were rescued. She was on a voyage from Wellington to New Plymouth and Sydney, New South Wales.

== 14 September ==
List of shipwrecks: 14 September 1857
Ship	State	Description
Kuba (Куба, 'Quba')	Imperial Russian Navy	The paddle steamer was driven ashore and wrecked at az:Cape Şüvəlan, Absheron Peninsula, Caspian Sea, with the loss of 22 of her 84 crew. (Note: Chernyshev gives the date as 29 September.)
Murray	United Kingdom	The ship was in collision with Kate Swanton (United Kingdom) and sank in the Droogden, off Copenhagen, Denmark. Her crew were rescued. She was on a voyage from Kronstadt, Russia to Liverpool, Lancashire.
Pegasus	Stettin	The galeass was wrecked near Hirtshals, Denmark. Her crew were rescued. She was on a voyage from Sunderland, County Durham, United Kingdom to Stettin.
Sampson	United Kingdom	The tug was in collision with the steamship Fyenoord (Netherlands) and sank in the River Thames at Gravesend, Kent.
Troubadour	United Kingdom	The ship foundered in the Atlantic Ocean. Her crew were rescued. She was on a voyage from Cardiff, Glamorgan to Athens, Greece.

== 15 September ==
List of shipwrecks: 15 September 1857
Ship	State	Description
Betsey	United Kingdom	The brigantine was wrecked at Portpatrick, Wigtownshire. Her crew were rescued.
Clio	United Kingdom	The barque was abandoned in the Atlantic Ocean. Her crew were rescued by Sagamore (United States). Clio was on a voyage from Quebec City, Province of Canada, British North America to Newcastle upon Tyne, Northumberland.
Emily	United Kingdom	The ship ran aground on Grassholm's Reef, in the Baltic Sea. She was on a voyage from Kronstadt, Russia to London. She was refloated and resumed her voyage.
Euphemia	(United Kingdom of Great Britain and Ireland) British North America	The brigantine was abandoned "at Grand River", Cape Breton Island, Nova Scotia. She was on a voyage from Shediac, New Brunswick to Swansea, Glamorgan.
Ferne	(United Kingdom of Great Britain and Ireland) British North America	The brigantine was driven ashore in Larshayen Bay. She was on a voyage from Prince Edward Island to "Hagland".
James Gibbs	United Kingdom	The ship was driven ashore at St. John's Point, County Down. She was on a voyage from Quebec City to the Clyde.
Minna	United Kingdom	The ship was driven ashore in the Yangtze-Kiang. She was on a voyage from Foo-Chow-Foo to Shanghai.
Nancy	(United Kingdom of Great Britain and Ireland) British North America	The brig capsized in the Atlantic Ocean with the loss of all but three of her crew. The survivors were rescued on 19 September by Eliza (United Kingdom). Nancy was on a voyage from Halifax, Nova Scotia to Puerto Rica.

== 16 September ==
List of shipwrecks: 16 September 1857
Ship	State	Description
Antonius	Flag unknown	The ship was driven ashore at Bolderāja, Russia.
Catharina	Flag unknown	The ship was driven ashore at Bolderāja.
Commerce	United Kingdom	The brigantine ran aground on the Goldstone Reef, in the Irish Sea. She was on a voyage from Alloa, Clackmannanshire to Rotterdam, South Holland, Netherlands. She was refloated and taken in to Holyhead, Anglesey in a leaky condition.
Conservative	United Kingdom	The ship was driven ashore and wrecked at Bolderāja. Her crew were rescued.
Daguerre	France	The brig sprang a leak and foundered in the English Channel off Beachy Head, Sussex, United Kingdom. Her crew were rescued. She was on a voyage from Sunderland, County Durham, United Kingdom to Bordeaux, Gironde.
Glory	Flag unknown	The ship was driven ashore at Bolderāja.
Harperley	United Kingdom	The ship ran aground on the Shipwash Sand, in the North Sea off the coast of Suffolk. She was on a voyage from West Hartlepool, County Durham to London. She was refloated and resumed her voyage.
Hope	United Kingdom	The ship was driven ashore and wrecked at Bolderāja. Her crew were rescued.
Isle of Wight	United Kingdom	The ship was driven ashore at Bolderāja. Her crew were rescued.
Johan Gezina	Flag unknown	The ship was driven ashore at Bolderāja.
Lady Sale	United Kingdom	The brig was run down and sunk off the Isle of May by HMS Pembroke (Royal Navy). Her crew were rescued. She was on a voyage from Arkhangelsk, Russia to London.
Princess Victoria	United Kingdom	The brig ran aground at Bolderāja. She was on a voyage from Bolderāja to Deptford, Kent. She was refloated and put back to Bolderāja.
Providentia	Flag unknown	The ship was driven ashore at Bolderāja.
Ruby	United Kingdom	The barque was driven ashore at the mouth of the Rangoon River and was abandoned. She capsized the next day.
Sedulous	United Kingdom	The ship was driven ashore and wrecked at Bolderāja. Her crew were rescued.
Simon Magnus	United Kingdom	The ship was driven ashore at Bolderāaj. Her crew were rescued.
St. Antonio	Flag unknown	The ship was driven ashore at Bolderāja.
Thomas James Marshall	United Kingdom	The barque was lost off Louisbourg, Nova Scotia, British North America. Her crew were rescued. She was on a voyage from Gloucester to Quebec City, Province of Canada, British North America.

== 17 September ==
List of shipwrecks: 17 September 1857
Ship	State	Description
Bell Rock	United Kingdom	The ship ran aground on the Goodwin Sands, Kent. She was on a voyage from Sunderland, County Durham to Calcutta, India. She was refloated and resumed her voyage.
Grantham	United Kingdom	The brig ran aground on the Cockle Sand in the North Sea off the coast of Norfolk. She was on a voyage from South Shields County Durham to London. She was refloated and resumed her voyage.
Johan August	Norway	The schooner ran aground and was wrecked off Gåsö, Sweden. She was on a voyage from Newcastle upon Tyne, Northumberland, United Kingdom to Christiania. She was refloated on 8 October and towed in to Drammen by the steamship Stromstart (Norway).
Preciosa	Norway	The ship was wrecked off Eckerö, Grand Duchy of Finland. She was on a voyage from Honfleur, Calvados, France to Härnösand, Sweden.
William	United Kingdom	The brig was in collision with the steamship European (United Kingdom) and sank off North Foreland, Kent. Her crew were rescued. She was on a voyage from Swansea to London. Also reported to have been wrecked on the Tongue Sand.

== 18 September ==
List of shipwrecks: 18 September 1857
Ship	State	Description
Bonne Mère	France	The ship sprang a leak and was beached 4 nautical miles (7.4 km) east of Calais. Her crew were rescued. She was on a voyage from Newcastle upon Tyne, Northumberland, United Kingdom to Oran, Algeria.
Charles	United States	Operating as a slave ship, the full-rigged ship was driven ashore on the coast of Portuguese West Africa about 40 miles (64 km) from Loando by the brig-sloop HMS Sappho (Royal Navy). About 150 slaves drowned, but about 380 were rescued.
Columbine	United Kingdom	The ship ran aground on Scroby Sands, Norfolk. She was on a voyage from London to Newcastle upon Tyne. She was refloated.
Hercules	United Kingdom	The brig was driven ashore on Bornholm, Denmark. She was on a voyage from "Wyborg" to Ipswich, Suffolk. She had become a wreck by 4 October.
Hirondelle	France	The ship was wrecked 4 leagues (12 nautical miles (22 km)) from Ventava, Courland Governorate.
Jerome Knight	United States	The ship was abandoned in the Atlantic Ocean. Her crew were rescued. She was on a voyage from Wilmington, North Carolina to Marseille, Bouches-du-Rhône, France.
Marie Claire	France	The ship was driven ashore 4 nautical miles (7.4 km) east of Calais. She was on a voyage from Newcastle upon Tyne to Oran, Algeria.

== 19 September ==
List of shipwrecks: 19 September 1857
Ship	State	Description
Andrea Elizabeth	Norway	The brig was driven ashore on Bornholm, Denmark. She was on a voyage from Tønsberg to La Rochelle, Charente-Inférieure.
Apollo	United Kingdom	The ship was driven ashore on Mainland, Shetland Islands. She was on a voyage from Cardiff, Glamorgan to Westerwick, Shetland Islands. She was refloated and taken in to Westerwick.
Brazilian	United Kingdom	The ship sprang a leak and was beached at Stromness, Orkney Islands. She was on a voyage from Liverpool, Lancashire to Narva, Russia.
De Koophandel	Netherlands	The galiot ran aground on the Long Sand, in the North Sea off the coast of Essex, United Kingdom. She was on a voyage from Newcastle upon Tyne, Northumberland, United Kingdom to Lisbon, Portugal. She was refloated with the aid of six smacks, but was driven onto the Grain Spit, off the Isle of Grain, Kent, United Kingdom and was wrecked. Her crew were rescued. She was refloated on 22 September and taken in to Sheerness, Kent in a waterlogged condition.
Goldfinch	United Kingdom	The ship was driven ashore and wrecked on Norsholm, off Farö, Sweden. Her crew were rescued. She was on a voyage from "Wyborg" to Hull, Yorkshire.
Keepsake	United Kingdom	The ship was driven ashore and severely damaged at Dunbar, Lothian. She was refloated on 2 October.
Nile	United States	The ship ran aground at Sunderland, County Durham, United Kingdom. She was on a voyage from Sunderland to New York. She was refloated and resumed he voyage.
Prince of Wales	United Kingdom	The schooner ran aground on the Herd Sand, in the North Sea off the coast of County Durham. She was on a voyage from Aberdeen to South Shields, County Durham. She was refloated and taken in to South Shields.

== 20 September ==
List of shipwrecks: 20 September 1857
Ship	State	Description
Adolph	Prussia	The brig ran aground on the Holm Sand, in the North Sea off the coast of Suffolk, United Kingdom. She was on a voyage from London to Newcastle upon Tyne, Northumberland, United Kingdom. She was refloated and resumed her voyage.
Sally	United Kingdom	The ship was driven ashore at Nieuwpoort, West Flanders, Belgium. She was on a voyage from Namsos, Norway to Nieuwpoort. She was refloated on 11 October and taken in to Ostend, West Flanders.

== 21 September ==
List of shipwrecks: 21 September 1857
Ship	State	Description
Elspeth	United Kingdom	The barque foundered 35 nautical miles (65 km) west north west of the Isles of Scilly. Her crew were rescued by Euxine (United Kingdom). Elspeth was on a voyage from Newcastle upon Tyne, Northumberland to Martinique.
Jeanette Malanie	Belgium	The ship was driven against the quayside and severely damaged at Ostend, West Flanders.
Paragon	United Kingdom	The brig was wrecked at North Kyn, Russia with the loss of three of her crew.

== 22 September ==
List of shipwrecks: 22 September 1857
Ship	State	Description
Ellf Geschwister	Danzig	The ship was driven ashore near "Kronenhoff Nehring". Her crew were rescued.
Jehu	United Kingdom	The ship was driven ashore at Reval, Russia. She was on a voyage from Hull, Yorkshire to Saint Petersburg, Russia. She had been refloated by 2 October and resumed her voyage.
John	Sweden	The schooner was driven ashore and wrecked near Reval. She was on a voyage from Hull to Saint Petersburg.
Kate Swanton	United Kingdom	The ship struck a rock south of "Lavenskar" and was damaged. She was on a voyage from Havana, Cuba to Kronstadt, Russia. She arrived at Kronstadt in a leaky condition.
Lefort	Imperial Russian Navy	Lefort. The Imperatritsa Aleksandra-class ship of the line capsized and sank in the Gulf of Finland between the islands of Gogland and Bolshoy Tyuters during a squall. All 826 people on board were killed.
Nile	United Kingdom	The barque was wrecked on the Seiskar Reef, in the Baltic Sea. Her crew were rescued.
Pandora	(United Kingdom of Great Britain and Ireland) Jersey	The schooner was driven ashore in Red Wharf Bay, Anglesey. She was on a voyage from Liverpool, Lancashire to Carbonear, Newfoundland, British North America. She was refloated on 24 September and taken in to Liverpool in a leaky condition.
Saucy Jack	United Kingdom	The schooner was driven ashore at "Lettapah" or "Lettipah", near Reval, Russia, on voyage from Liverpool for Narva, Russia with salt.

== 23 September ==
List of shipwrecks: 23 September 1857
Ship	State	Description
Brunswick	United Kingdom	The steamship was wrecked at Reval, Russia.
Robinson	United Kingdom	The barque ran aground on the Shipwash Sand, in the North Sea of the coast of Suffolk. She was on a voyage from Kronstadt, Russia to North Shieds, County Durham. She was refloated with assistance from the yawls Assistance and Hand of Providence (both United Kingdom) and taken in to Harwich, Essex in a waterlogged condition.

== 24 September ==
List of shipwrecks: 24 September 1857
Ship	State	Description
Allendale	United Kingdom	The barque was driven ashore at Agger, Denmark. She was on a voyage from Newcastle upon Tyne, Northumberland to Kronstadt, Russia.
Ayrshire Lass	United Kingdom	The ship ran aground on Saltholm, Denmark. She was on a voyage from Liverpool, Lancashire to Narva, Russia.
Ceres	Flag unknown	The ship was driven ashore and wrecked at "Munckovick" (or Mackowiecim), Russia.
Dart Packet	(United Kingdom of Great Britain and Ireland) Jersey	The ship sprang a leak and foundered in the English Channel off Falmouth, Cornwall. Her crew were rescued. She was on a voyage from Saundersfoot, Pembrokeshire to Exeter, Devon.
Hoffnung	Flag unknown	The ship was driven ashore at "Munckovick".
James Ewing	United Kingdom	The ship was driven ashore at Cove, Argyllshire. She was on a voyage from Tobago to Greenock, Renfrewshire.
Mount Washington	Flag unknown	The barque was driven ashore and wrecked at "Munckovick" (or "Mackowiecim"), in Kaspar Bay. Her crew survived.
Nautilus	Flag unknown	The ship was driven ashore and wrecked at "Munckovick" (or "Mackowiecim").
Penelope	United Kingdom	The ship was lost on "Bjiske" or "Fjerke" (Bird's Island). She was on a voyage from Liverpool to "Wyborg".
Peter and Sophia	United Kingdom	The ship was driven ashore at Riga, Russia. She was refloated on 27 September.
Primavera	Spain	The ship departed from Liverpool for St. Jago de Cuba, Cuba. No further trace, presumed foundered with the loss of all hands.
Prinz Oscar	Flag unknown	The ship was driven ashore and wrecked at "Munckovick". She was on a voyage from South Shields, County Durham, United Kingdom to Kronstadt.
Regard	United Kingdom	The ship was driven ashore and wrecked at "Nealos" (or "Malos"), Russia.
Rena	Kingdom of Hanover	The ship foundered in the North Sea off Heligoland. Her crew were rescued by Jane and Mary (United Kingdom). She was on a voyage from the Hunte to Bo'ness, Lothian, United Kingdom.
Shanghae	Prussia	The full-rigged ship ran aground on the Cork Sand, in the North Sea off the coast of Essex, United Kingdom. She was on a voyage from Oulu, Grand Duchy of Finland to Liverpool, Lancashire, United Kingdom. Shanghae was refloated on 1 October and taken in to Harwich, Essex in a waterlogged condition.
St. John	United Kingdom	The barque was driven ashore on Miscou Island, New Brunswick, British North America. She was on a voyage from the Clyde to Bathurst, New Brunswick. Salvage was abandoned in July 1858 and she was broken up in situ.
Tanfield	United Kingdom	The brig ran aground off the Landguard Fort, Harwich. She was on a voyage from Brăila, Ottoman Empire to Ipswich, Suffolk. She was refloated and towed in to Harwich.
Waterford	United Kingdom	The ship was abandoned off Anticosti Island, Nova Scotia, British North America. Her crew were rescued by Devon (United Kingdom). Waterford was on a voyage from Waterford to Quebec City, Province of Canada, BritishNorth America.

== 25 September ==
List of shipwrecks: 25 September 1857
Ship	State	Description
Admiral Benbow	United Kingdom	The schooner sank in the Baltic Sea 25 nautical miles (46 km) off Pillau, Prussia. Her crew were rescued by Louise (United Kingdom). Admiral Benbow was on a voyage from Newcastle upon Tyne, Northumberland to Riga, Russia.
A. L. Crawford	United Kingdom	The ship departed from Liverpool, Lancashire for Havana, Cuba. No further trace, presumed foundered with the loss of all hands.
Commodore	United Kingdom	The brig was driven ashore at "Subessern", 14 Prussian miles (57.0 nautical miles (105.5 km)) from Domesnes, Russia. Her crew were rescued. She was on a voyage from Reval to a port on the east coast of Scotland.
Hannah	United Kingdom	The brig was driven ashore and wrecked at "Siekraggen", near Domesnes. Her crew were rescued. She was on a voyage from Kronstadt to Reval, Russia.
Laurel	United Kingdom	The ship was driven ashore near Reval.
Susan	(United Kingdom of Great Britain and Ireland) Cape Colony	The cutter struck a sunken rock and sank in Saldanha Bay. Her crew were rescued.
Wilhelmine	Hamburg	The ship was driven ashore near Domesnes with the loss of two of her five crew. She was on a voyage from Riga to an English port.

== 26 September ==
List of shipwrecks: 26 September 1857
Ship	State	Description
Annan	United Kingdom	The sloop was in collision with the paddle steamer Queen (United Kingdom) and sank in the Irish Sea off the Pile Foundry, Lancashire with the loss of two lives. She was on a voyage from Liverpool, Lancashire to Annan, Dumfriesshire. Annan was subsequently towed in to Fleetwood, Lancashire in a waterlogged condition by the fishing smacks Overton and Prince of Wales (both United Kingdom).
Ashley	United Kingdom	The brig was driven ashore and wrecked on Hiiumaa, Russia. She was on a voyage from Newcastle upon Tyne, Northumberland to Kronstadt, Russia.
Cruz e Gonçalves	Portugal	The schooner foundered off Gibraltar. Her crew were rescued by HMS Curlew, HMS Vulture and the tug Ward (United Kingdom). Cruz e Gonçalves was on a voyage from Huelva, Spain to Newcastle upon Tyne.
Taymouth Castle	United Kingdom	The brig foundered off "Falconera", Ottoman Empire. Her crew were rescued. She was on a voyage from Cardiff, Glamorgan to Constantinople, Ottoman Empire.

== 27 September ==
List of shipwrecks: 27 September 1857
Ship	State	Description
Elizabeth	United Kingdom	The schooner ran aground on the Newcombe Sand, in the North Sea off the coast of Suffolk.
Giulia	Kingdom of the Two Sicilies	The brig capsized in the Atlantic Ocean with the loss of a crew member. She was on a voyage from New York to Cádiz, Spain.
Rimswell	United Kingdom	The ship was discovered derelict in the Baltic Sea. She was towed in to Memel, Prussia by the steamship Luna (Prussia).
Royal Sovereign	United Kingdom	The barque was driven ashore at Miramichi, New Brunswick. She was refloated on 19 November and taken in to Miramichi.
Vivandière	(United Kingdom of Great Britain and Ireland) British North America	The ship foundered in the Mediterranean Sea off Aléria, Corsica, France. Her crew were rescued.

== 28 September ==
List of shipwrecks: 28 September 1857
Ship	State	Description
Pontus	United Kingdom	The ship was wrecked at the entrance to Farö Sound. She was on a voyage from London to Stockholm, Sweden.
Luzon	Spain	The ship was driven ashore and wrecked in the New Topsail Inlet. She was on a voyage from Havana to Falmouth, Cornwall, United Kingdom.
Vulcan	United Kingdom	The ship ran aground and was severely damaged at Riga, Russia.
Zorg en Vliet	Netherlands	The ship was discovered abandoned in the Baltic Sea. She was towed in to Pillau, Prussia on 30 September.

== 29 September ==
List of shipwrecks: 29 September 1857
Ship	State	Description
A. L. Crawford	United States	The schooner departed from Liverpool, Lancashire, United Kingdom for Havana, Cuba. No further trace, presumed foundered with the loss of all hands.
Alliance	Hamburg	The ship was lost off Fredrikshavn, Denmark. She was on a voyage from Hamburg to Saint Petersburg, Russia.
Friend	United Kingdom	The brig foundered in the Irish Sea off the Isle of Man with the loss of a crew member.
Jean	United Kingdom	The brig ran aground on the Holme Sand, in the North Sea off the coast of Suffolk. She was on a voyage from Seaham, County Durham to Whitstable, Kent. She was refloated.
Lord William Bentinck	United Kingdom	The ship foundered in the Atlantic Ocean. Her crew were rescued by the brig Lucilla (United Kingdom).
Marmion	United Kingdom	The ship was driven ashore and wrecked on Saaremaa, Russia. She was on a voyage from Newcastle upon Tyne, Northumberland to Turku, Grand Duchy of Finland.
Postillion	United Kingdom	The ship was driven ashore and wrecked on "Nackoe". She was on a voyage from Saint Petersburg to Riga, Russia.
Sykes	United Kingdom	The ship was wrecked on the Virgin Rock, off Frederikshavn. She was on a voyage from Hull, Yorkshire to "Wyborg".

== 30 September ==
List of shipwrecks: 30 September 1857
Ship	State	Description
Athenian	United Kingdom	The ship was abandoned in the Atlantic Ocean. Her crew were rescued by Patrick Henry (United Kingdom). Athenian was on a voyage from Quebec City, Province of Canada, British North America to South Shields, County Durham.
Beta	United Kingdom	The ship was driven ashore south of Bridlington, Yorkshire. She was on a voyage from Bridlington to Newcastle upon Tyne, Northumberland. She was refloated the next day and taken in to Bridlington.
Cecilia	United Kingdom	The ship was driven ashore at Danzig with the loss of all hands.
Celt	United Kingdom	The ship ran aground in Kunda Bay, in the Baltic Sea. She was refloated on 2 October and resumed her voyage.
Dido	United Kingdom	The ship was driven ashore on Hiiumaa, Russia. she was on a voyage from Cádiz, Spain to "Wyburg". She was later refloated and repaired.
Hope	United Kingdom	The ship ran aground on the Tongue Sand, in the Thames Estuary. She was refloated and taken in to Sheerness, Kent in a leaky condition.
Sabina	United Kingdom	The barque ran aground in the Min River. She was later refloated and taken in to Hong Kong for repairs.

== Unknown date ==
List of shipwrecks: Unknown date in September 1857
Ship	State	Description
HMS Assistance	Royal Navy	The troopship ran aground in the Bangka Strait. She was refloated with assistance from HMS Firm (Royal Navy).
Bonne Amelie	France	The brig foundered in the Atlantic Ocean off the Azores before 16 September. Her crew were rescued. She was on a voyage from Tampico, Mexico to Havre de Grâce, Seine-Inférieure.
Brockett	United Kingdom	The ship was driven ashore at "Balranald", British North America. She was on a voyage from Quebec City, Province of Canada, British North America to Newcastle upon Tyne, Northumberland. She was refloated before 21 September but later drove ashore again and was wrecked.
Catherine	United Kingdom	The ship was run into by another vessel and sank in the Atlantic Ocean. Her crew were rescued. She was on a voyage from Cardiff, Glamorgan to New York, United States.
George Swinton	United Kingdom	The ship was wrecked on Oyster Island. She was on a voyage from Akyab, British Burma to Calcutta India.
Harriet Cann	United Kingdom	The ship was driven ashore at Ballyedmond, County Wexford. She was refloated on 29 September and taken in to Warrenpoint, County Down.
Ida	United Kingdom	The schooner was wrecked at Brass, Nigeria. She was on a voyage from Liverpool, Lancashire to Brass.
Illinois	United States	The steamship ran aground on the Colorados. She was on a voyage from Aspinwall, Republic of New Granada to New York. She was refloated and taken in to Havana, Cuba.
John Parker	United States	The ship was lost off Cape Lookout, North Carolina before 19 September. Her crew were rescued. She was on a voyage from New Orleans, Louisiana to Rotterdam, South Holland, Netherlands.
Larpool	United Kingdom	The schooner was driven ashore and wrecked at Rauschen, Prussia. Her crew were rescued. She was on a voyage from Memel, Prussia to London.
Linden	United Kingdom	The barque sprang a leak and foundered in the Atlantic Ocean (51°22′N 21°19′W). Her crew were rescued by the barque Agnes (United Kingdom). Linden was on a voyage from Sligo to Quebec City.
Minerva	Prussia	The barque collided with William Kirk (United Kingdom) and was abandoned. Her crew were rescued by William Kirk. Minerva was on a voyage from Cardiff, Glamorgan, United Kingdom to Marseille, Bouches-du-Rhône, France.
Prince Oscar	Flag unknown	The ship was wrecked at Reval, Russia.
Semiramis	United Kingdom	The ship foundered off Colombo, Ceylon. She was on a voyage from Colombo to Liverpool.
Sumroo	United Kingdom	The ship caught fire at Galle, Ceylon and was scuttled. She was on a voyage from Calcutta to the Persian Gulf.
Vandolara	United Kingdom	The ship ran aground on the Haisborough Sands, in the North Sea off the coast of Norfolk. She was refloated and resumed her voyage, but consequently put in to Plymouth, Devon in a leaky condition.
