= Balenciaga =

France-based Spanish luxury fashion house

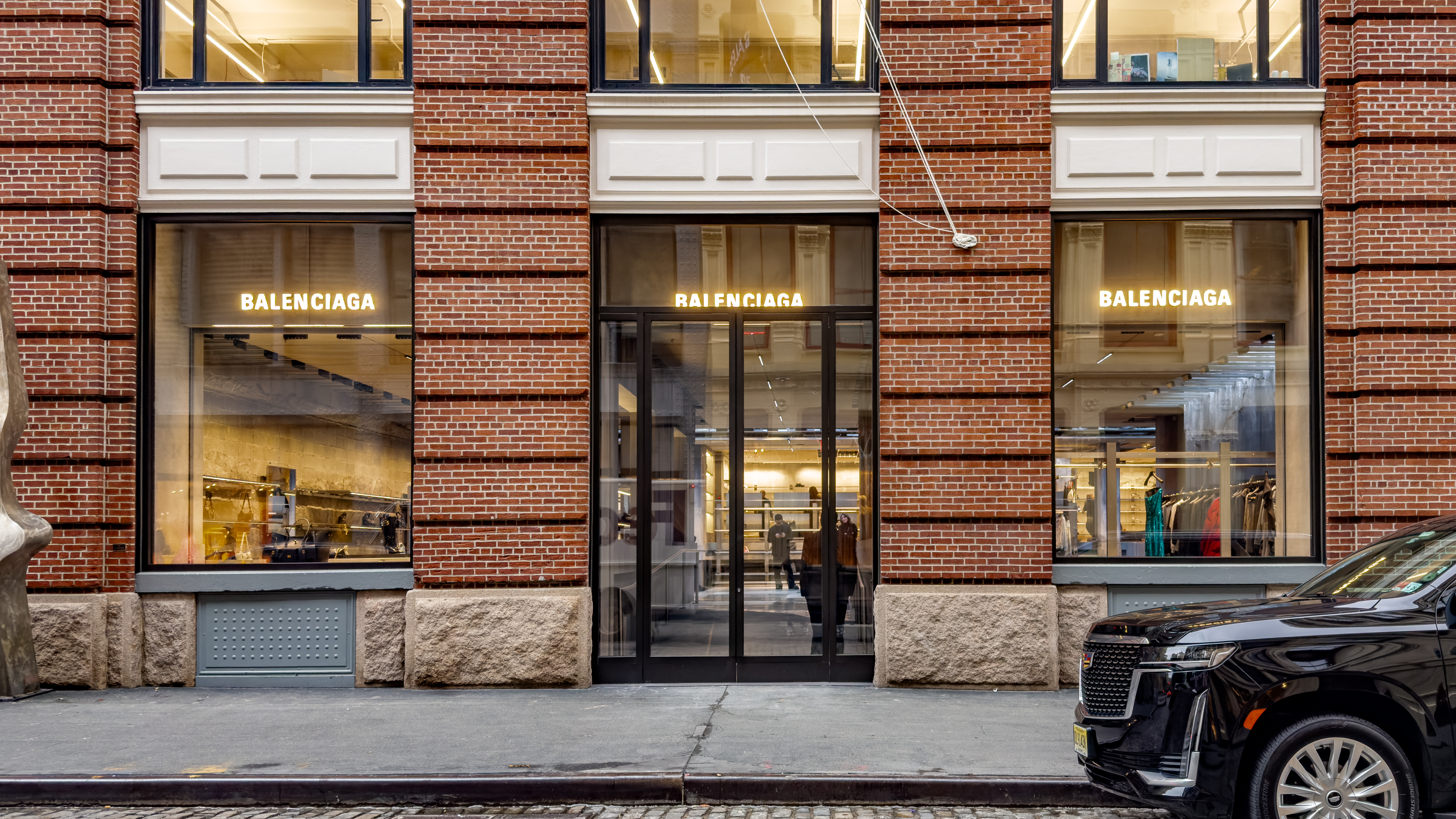
- Store in SoHo, Manhattan
- Type: Subsidiary
- Industry: Fashion
- Predecessor: Balenciaga y Compañía; EISA, S.A.
- Founded: 1919; 107 years ago, in San Sebastián, Spain
- Founder: Cristóbal Balenciaga
- Headquarters: Paris, France
- Number of locations: 282 stores worldwide (2025)
- Area served: Worldwide
- Key people: Gianfranco Gianangeli (CEO); Martine Rose (Creative Director)
- Parent: Kering
- Website: balenciaga.com

Balenciaga SA (/bəˌlɛnsiˈɑːɡə/ bə-LEN-see-AH-gə; Spanish: [balenˈθjaɣa]; Basque: [balents̻i.aɣa]) is a French fashion house of Spanish origin, headquartered in Paris. It designs, manufactures and markets ready-to-wear footwear, handbags, and accessories, and licenses its name and branding to the European cosmetics company L'Oréal for its namesake fragrances.

The brand was originally founded in San Sebastián by the Spanish couturier Cristóbal Balenciaga in 1919 before its establishment in Paris in 1937 as a result of the Spanish Civil War. Closed in 1968 by its founder who died three years later, Balenciaga was ultimately acquired in 1986 by the French fragrance group Jacques Bogart, which subsequently relaunched the brand and revitalized it. It is now owned by the French luxury goods holding company Kering, controlled by the Pinault family, after its acquisition in 2001.

Gianfranco Gianangeli has been CEO of Balenciaga since November 2024. British designer Martine Rose was appointed the creative director of Balenciaga in November 2026, following the departure of Italian designer Pierpaolo Piccioli.

== History ==
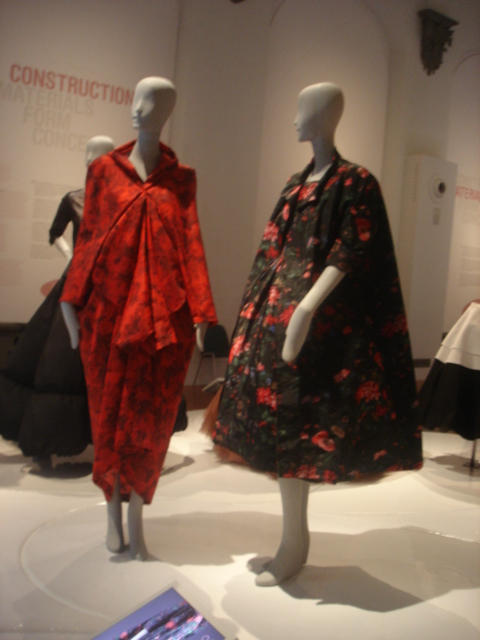
Dresses designed by Cristóbal Balenciaga on display in Florence, Italy

=== Founding to 1968 ===
Cristóbal Balenciaga opened his first boutique in San Sebastián (Spain) in 1917, and expanded to include branches in Madrid and Barcelona. The Spanish royal family and aristocracy wore his designs. When the Spanish Civil War forced him to close his stores, he moved to Paris.

Balenciaga opened his Paris couture house on Avenue George V in August 1937, where his first fashion show featured designs heavily influenced by the Spanish Renaissance. His success was nearly immediate. In two years, the press lauded him as a revolutionary, and his designs were highly sought after. Carmel Snow, the editor of Harper's Bazaar, was an early champion of his designs.

Historians believe that Balenciaga's continued activity during the German occupation of Paris was made possible by his connections with Spanish dictator Francisco Franco, who ensured Spain’s non-belligerent status and maintained diplomatic relations with German dictator Adolf Hitler. The relation to Franco was so close that Balenciaga designed clothing for the Franco family. The company was one of only 60 allowed to operate during the occupation, and the ongoing supply of raw materials from Spain, which were in short supply in Paris due to the war, gave Balenciaga a competitive advantage. However, he testified that he refused Hitler's request to transfer his company's activities to Berlin.

During the post-war years, his lines became more linear and sleek, diverging from the hourglass shape popularized by "Christian Dior's New Look". The fluidity of his silhouettes enabled him to manipulate the relationship between his clothing and women's bodies. In 1951, he transformed the silhouette, broadening the shoulders and removing the waist. In 1955, he designed the tunic dress, which later developed into the chemise dress of 1958. Other contributions in the postwar era included the spherical balloon jacket (1953), the high-waisted baby doll dress (1957), the cocoon coat (1957), the balloon skirt (1957), and the sack dress (1957). In 1959, his work culminated in the Empire line, with high-waisted dresses and coats cut like kimono. His manipulation of the waist, in particular, constituted "what is considered to be his most important contribution to the world of fashion: a new silhouette for women".

During this time, Balenciaga also released fragrances such as Le Dix and Quadrille.

In the 1960s, Balenciaga tended toward heavy fabrics, intricate embroidery, and bold materials. His trademarks included "collars that stood away from the collarbone to give a swanlike appearance" and shortened "bracelet" sleeves. His often spare, sculptural creations—including funnel-shape gowns of stiff duchess satin worn to acclaim by clients such as Pauline de Rothschild, Bunny Mellon, Marella Agnelli, Hope Portocarrero, Gloria Guinness, and Mona von Bismarck—were considered masterworks of haute couture in the 1950s and 1960s. In 1960, he designed the wedding dress for Queen Fabiola of Belgium made of ivory duchess satin trimmed with white mink at the collar and the hips. Jackie Kennedy famously upset her husband by buying Balenciaga's expensive creations while John F. Kennedy was president—he apparently feared that the American public might think the purchases too lavish. Her haute couture bills were eventually discreetly paid by her father-in-law, Joseph Kennedy.

==== Protégés ====
Several designers who worked for Balenciaga would go on to open their own successful couture houses, notably Oscar de la Renta (1949), Andre Courreges (1950), and Emanuel Ungaro (1958), but his most famous and noted protégé was Hubert de Givenchy, who was the lone designer to side with Balenciaga against the Chambre Syndicale de la Haute Couture Parisienne and also the press over the scheduling of his shows.

==== Battle against the press ====
In 1957, Balenciaga famously decided to show his collection to the fashion press the day before the clothing retail delivery date, not the standard four weeks before the retail delivery date the fashion industry followed at the time. By keeping the press unaware of the design of his garments until the day before they were shipped to stores, he hoped to curtail ongoing piracy and copying of his designs. The press resisted, finding it nearly impossible to get his work into their print deadlines, but Balenciaga and protégé Givenchy stood firm, seriously impacting their coverage and press of the era. His supporters would argue that rival Christian Dior would gain acclaim from copying Balenciaga's silhouettes and cuts, claiming them as his own original work; because Balenciaga was not interested in press coverage, the media and consumers never knew.

In 1967, both designers reversed their decision and joined the traditional schedule.

==== Battle against the Chambre ====
Balenciaga defiantly resisted the rules, guidelines, and bourgeoisie status of the Chambre syndicale de la haute couture parisienne, and, thus, was never a member.

Cristóbal Balenciaga closed his fashion house in 1968 and died in 1972. Following the death of the couturier, the company was taken over by his nephews before coming under the control of the German chemical and pharmaceutical group Hoechst in 1978.

=== 1986: Revival of the brand ===
In 1986, the fragrance group Jacques Bogart acquired Balenciaga and appointed fashion designer Michel Goma as artistic director in an effort to modernise the house. A ready-to-wear line was launched in 1987. From 1987 to 1991, Jacqueline Zirigovich served as artistic director, revisiting Cristóbal Balenciaga’s archives to develop collections aligned with the founder’s aesthetic. In 1990, Balenciaga released Balenciaga pour Homme, which was created by perfumer Gerard Anthony. In 1992, Josephus Thimister was appointed artistic director and reinterpreted the brand through a bold minimalist approach.

In 1997, Nicolas Ghesquière was appointed Artistic Director of Balenciaga. He maintained the house’s restrained and controlled aesthetic while modernising its references and exploring the relationship between body and garment that was central to the work of the Spanish couturier. During this period, Balenciaga introduced its first iconic handbag, the Motorcycle bag. The brand gained popularity among celebrities, including Madonna. In 2000, Balenciaga reported a 17% increase in sales, reaching 113.2 million French francs.

=== 2001 to 2010 ===
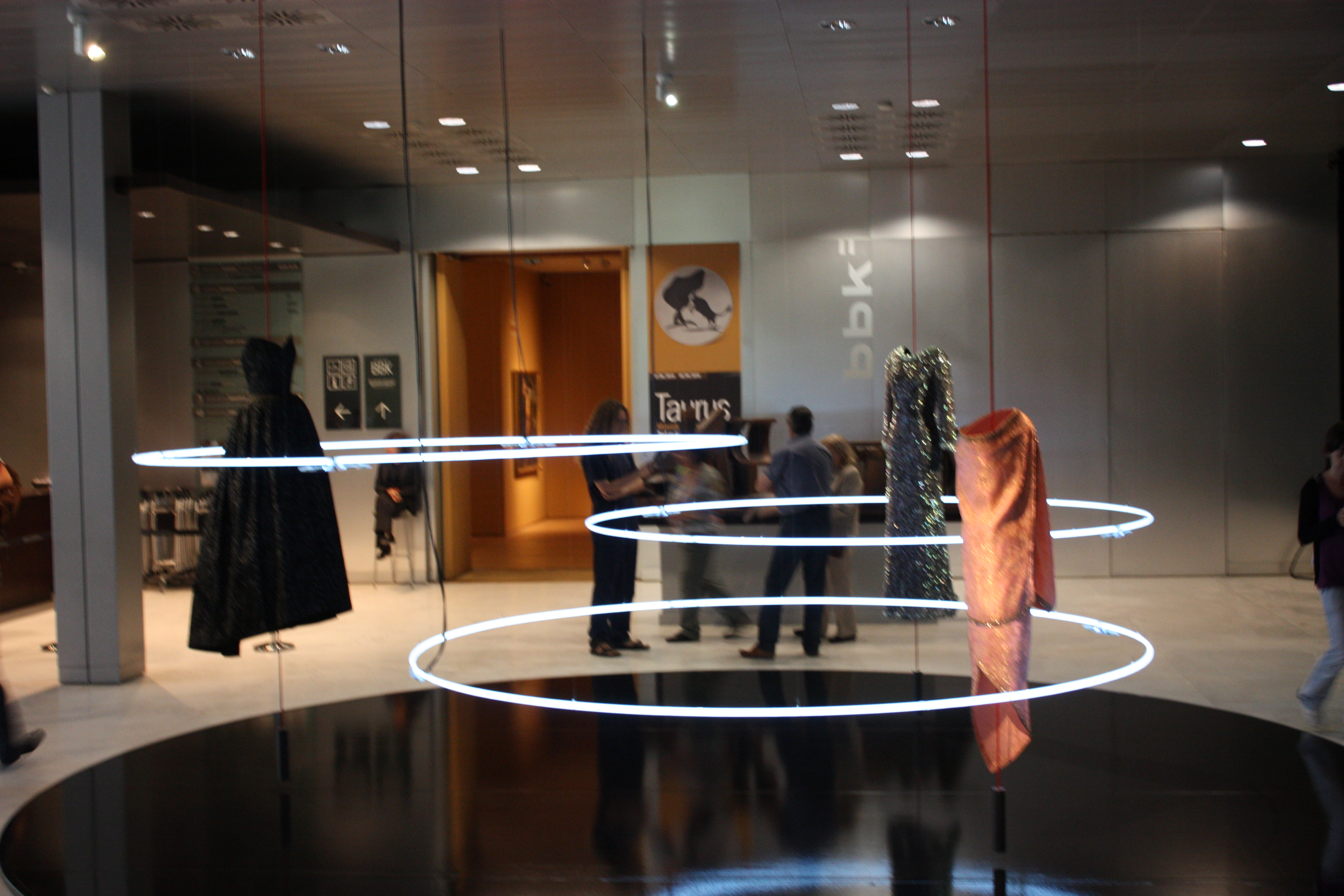
Balenciaga exhibit, Fine Arts Museum (Museo de Bellas Artes de Bilbao), Bilbao, Spain

The Gucci group, under the ownership of the Pinault Printemps Redoute (PPR) group (now Kering), acquired a controlling stake in Balenciaga in 2001, bringing the historic fashion house into the same corporate family as other luxury brands such as Yves Saint Laurent, Boucheron, and Bottega Veneta. James McArthur subsequently took over as chief executive of the brand.

In 2002, Balenciaga's star, Nicolas Ghesquière, admitted to copying the work of Kaisik Wong, a designer from San Francisco who died in 1990. Ghesquière created a patchwork vest in his spring collection that resembled one that Wong designed in 1973. Ghesquière admitted in an interview in Paris that he had copied the garment.

In 2003, Balenciaga released Eau de Cristobal.

Ghesquière's F/W 2005 line showed that the house was not only making money, but also attracted a number of celebrity customers including editor-in-chief at Vogue, Anna Wintour.

The House of Balenciaga designed the dresses worn by Jennifer Connelly and Nicole Kidman to the 2006 Academy Awards, as well as the wedding gown Kidman wore when she married Keith Urban. Kylie Minogue also wore a Balenciaga dress for her "Slow" and "Red Blooded Woman" music videos and for her concert tour.

Balenciaga's Fall/Winter 2007 show impressed Teen Vogue editor-in-chief Amy Astley so much that an entire spread in the magazine, titled "Global Studies" and shot in Beijing, was influenced by it. The line included skinny jodhpurs, tight, fitted blazers, beaded embellished scarves, and other multicultural mixes.

Balenciaga is known for creating avant-garde, advanced structural pieces, straddling the edge of fashion and forecasting the future of women's ready-to-wear fashion. Vintage Balenciaga garments are popular among fashion editors, Hollywood stars, and models, and have been seen on Sienna Miller, Lara Bingle, Raquel Zimmermann, Caroline Trentini, Emmanuelle Alt, Tatiana Sorokko, Hilary Rhoda, Jennifer Garner, and Stephanie Seymour, among others. Balenciaga is also frequently worn by actress Chloë Sevigny, who is also a muse of Nicolas Ghesquière.

=== 2010 to present ===
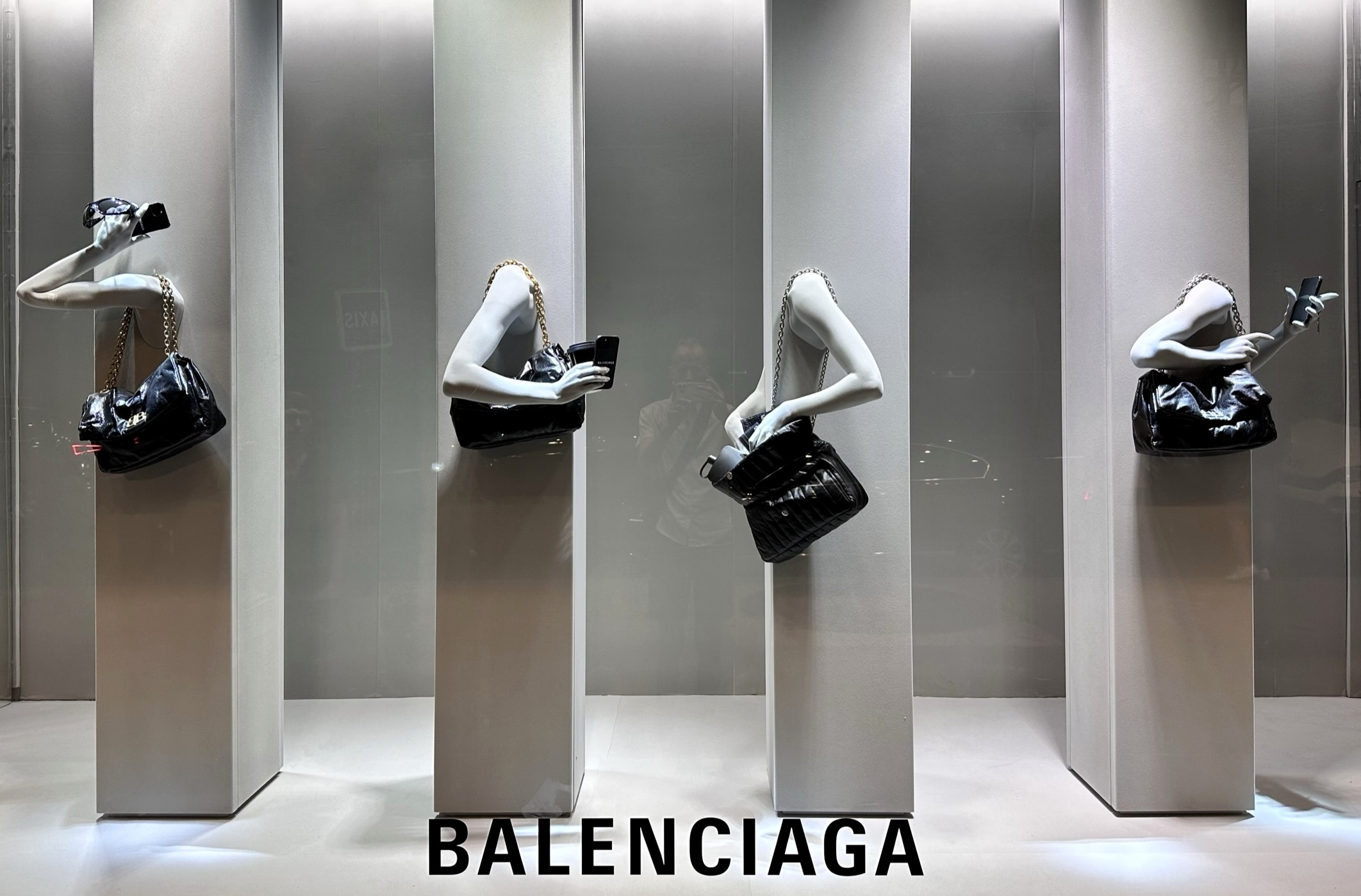
Balenciaga handbags on display at the Galeries Lafayette in Paris

In March 2011 at M. H. de Young Museum in San Francisco, USA, Balenciaga celebrated the opening of Balenciaga and Spain, a 120-piece fashion retrospective of Cristóbal Balenciaga's career. The exhibition included many designs from the museum's encyclopedic costume collection. The $2,500-a-ticket fund-raiser for the museum drew 350 guests, including Denise Hale, Marissa Mayer, Vanessa Getty, Victoria Traina, Vanessa Traina, Jamie Tisch, Gwyneth Paltrow, Orlando Bloom, Balthazar Getty, Maggie Rizer, Connie Nielsen, Maria Bello, and Mia Wasikowska.

In June 2011, the Cristóbal Balenciaga Museum opened in Getaria, Spain.

In November 2012, Balenciaga announced that it was parting with creative director Nicolas Ghesquière, ending his 15-year tenure. The brand announced Alexander Wang as its new creative director. Wang presented his first collection for the label on 28 February 2013, at Paris Fashion Week. In 2014, the Tribunal de grande instance de Paris set a trial date for the lawsuit between Balenciaga vs. Ghesquière. Balenciaga claimed that Ghesquière's comments in the magazine System had hurt the company's image. The highly publicized suit was mediated out of court.

In 2013, Balenciaga released L'Eau Rose.

In July 2015, Balenciaga announced it was parting with creative director Alexander Wang after three years. The Spring/Summer 2016 show was his last, featuring white lounge wear made from soft, natural fabrics. In early October 2015, the brand appointed Demna Gvasalia as its new creative director.

In October 2016, Cédric Charbit was appointed CEO. Formerly the executive vice president of product and marketing at Saint Laurent, Charbit steered Balenciaga in a commercial direction. Under his tenure, the brand experienced significant growth; analysts estimated $2 billion in revenue for 2022.

Under Demna, Balenciaga's stores used artists' work in place of conventional mannequins. From 2017 its windows featured installations of hyperrealistic figures by the sculptor Mark Jenkins, from Colette in Paris to Selfridges in London. Through its Art in Stores programme, Demna also chose artists including Anna Uddenberg, Tejo Remy and Rosie McGinn to make work for its stores. In 2022 McGinn's kinetic inflatable figures of models from the Fall 2022 runway, which rose and collapsed on a timer, replaced the mannequins in the windows of the Madison Avenue store in New York before touring stores in Europe and Asia.

In 2018, Balenciaga was the subject of a social media backlash in China when personnel at one of Balenciaga's Paris stores assaulted a Chinese tourist.

In April 2021 Gvasalia presented his new Pre-Fall 2021 collection, as promoted by Vanity Teen magazine. In August 2021, Justin Bieber was announced as the new face of Balenciaga. In September 2021, the brand faced backlash when it released trompe-l'œil sweatpants with the illusion of plaid boxers sticking out the top with a price tag of $1,190.

In May 2022, Balenciaga announced that it accepts crypto payments.

In October 2022 Balenciaga announced that it was severing its ties to Kanye West due to his anti-semitic comments.

In November 2022, Balenciaga released an advertising campaign featuring six young children holding teddy bears dressed in BDSM gear, amidst empty wine glasses and champagne flutes, prompting strong public backlash, with brand ambassador Kim Kardashian saying she was “disgusted and outraged.”

In December 2023, Balenciaga was awarded by the People for the Ethical Treatment of Animals (PETA) with the prize for best luxury product for its entirely vegan coat made from Lunaform, a plant-based leather.

In May 2024, Balenciaga opened a new flagship store in Tokyo. Later in June, Balenciaga opened its first store in Cancún, Mexico.

In November 2024, Gianfranco Gianangeli was appointed CEO, replacing Cédric Charbit who had led the brand since 2016.

In March 2025, Demna stepped down as creative director after nearly 10 years leading the brand through an era of rapid growth. Before his departure, Demna curated Balenciaga by Demna, a retrospective of his decade at the house, shown at Kering's headquarters at 40 rue de Sèvres in Paris from 26 June to 9 July 2025. It presented 101 exhibits from 30 collections, with captions narrated in an AI rendering of Demna's voice. Garments were shown on hyperrealistic sculptures of the models who first wore them, beginning with Eliza Douglas in the look that opened his first show. Some pieces were installed as artworks by artists from the Art in Stores programme. Mark Jenkins reinterpreted the closing look of the Summer 2022 "Red Carpet" collection, which Demna himself wore, as a life-size sculpture, and six shoes and accessories were built into kinetic sculptures from Andrew J. Greene's Timeless Symbols series.

From July 2025 to November 2026, Pierpaolo Piccioli was the creative director of Balenciaga. His brief tenure was met with mixed reviews.

In November 2026, Balenciaga announced the appointment of designer Martine Rose as the next creative director. She is the first woman to lead the house of Balenciaga. Martine Rose has previously worked for Balenciaga under Demna as a menswear consultant from 2015 to 2018.

==== Brand ambassadors ====
In July 2023, Balenciaga announced its first-ever brand ambassadors, Isabelle Huppert and PP Krit Amnuaydechkorn. This is the first time in history, Balenciaga announced a brand ambassador.

In November 2023, Balenciaga appointed Michelle Yeoh as its brand ambassador.

In December 2023, Balenciaga introduced its new brand ambassador, Nicole Kidman.

In January 2024, Kim Kardashian became the brand ambassador of Balenciaga.

==== Support for Ukraine ====
In March 2022 during Paris Fashion Week, Balenciaga expressed support for Ukraine during the Russo-Ukrainian War. T-shirts in yellow and blue (like the Ukrainian flag) were placed on the chairs. Creative director Demna Gvasalia recited a poem "Live Ukraine, live for beauty" by Ukrainian writer Oleksandr Oles at the beginning and end of the show. He noted that this show is self-explanatory, as a dedication to "fearlessness, resistance, and the victory of love and peace". The brand also made donations to the UN World Food Programme to support Ukrainian refugees.

== Controversies ==
=== Plagiarism ===
Artists accused the brand of plagiarism. Artist Tra My Nguyen accuses the brand of having used her portfolio that a recruiter of the brand had requested before reusing it without having spoken with the artist or the latter having given him her permission.

He also copied famous brands such as Rick Owens

=== Advertising campaign involving children ===
On November 16, 2022, Balenciaga released an online "Gift Shop" advertising campaign featuring six young children holding teddy bears dressed in bondage and BDSM gear, amidst empty wine glasses and champagne flutes. Photographer Gabriele Galimberti claimed the images were part of a series of projects titled "Toy Stories". All the children photographed are children of Balenciaga employees. A few days later, a link was made between this campaign and another simultaneous Balenciaga campaign, "Garde-Robe" (with adidas), where three photographs were the focus of criticism: A photograph of a bag placed on a Supreme Court document on the child pornography case United States v. Williams (2008), a photograph of actress Isabelle Huppert, featuring the book As Sweet as It Gets (2014) by Belgian painter Michaël Borremans visible in the background. The latter had already produced several paintings depicting naked young children. Another photograph from the campaign features a diploma with the name John Phillip Fisher, a convicted incest offender. About these three props Demna stated "It was a set of negligent and unfortunate coincidences. I don't know how they ended up there."

On TikTok, videos of users destroying Balenciaga products made the controversy viral. Among the brand's ambassadors, Kim Kardashian expressed disgust and outrage, and Nicole Kidman was criticized for refusing to denounce the campaign. On November 22, Balenciaga removed both campaigns and apologized. For the "Garde-Robe" campaign, Balenciaga announced that it was taking legal action against the production company North Six and set designer Nicholas Des Jardins, claiming that they were responsible for the advertisement with the child pornography court document. In response, the set designer's attorney said that Balenciaga representatives were present at the shoot and handled the papers and props used. Balenciaga dropped their legal action on December 2. Creative director Demna Gvasalia apologized. In March 2023, he stated "I didn't see the creepy part of it. But it's obvious now", "It was […] a stupid mistake".

Kering stated that a committee of dozens of people approved the campaign, photographer Galimberti stated that he was only requested to light the scene, and take the shots. Balenciaga’s CEO Charbit elaborated "The artistic director oversees the creative. I take all the business decisions, have the final cut and responsibility. We collectively failed." Kering's CEO François-Henri Pinault stated that he took full responsibility.

In January 2025, the CGT, France’s main trade union, submitted a report alleging mistreatment of the six children featured in the November 2022 campaign to the parliamentary Commission of Inquiry into Violence Committed in Film, Audiovisual, Live Performance, Fashion and Advertising Sectors. The CGT stated that no prior authorization was requested and that the photo shoot took place on school days, in violation of the French Labour Code. The report states that no parent would ever have allowed their children to be placed in the midst of such a staging.

"Balenciaga's Machiavellian deceit consisted of only summoning the children of Balenciaga employees, thus carrying out a real trap."

In January 2026, the CGT revealed that the Labor Inspectorate controlled Balenciaga based on the CGT report. They found that no mandatory autorisation was requested and that the parents have been abused as employees. It wrote that "Balenciaga’s teams pressured the horrified parents, who naturally opposed the online publication of such photos of their children." The CGT called for a medical examination and judicial protection for the six children.

In June 2026, the association Juristes pour l'enfance wrote to the Paris Public Prosecutor's Office and to the French Office for Minors (OFMIN), requesting medical examinations of the six children who appeared in the campaign. The association also called for "a criminal investigation, or at the very least a social inquiry into the situation of the minors".

== Directors ==
- 2016–2024: Cédric Charbit
- 2024–present: Gianfranco Gianangeli

=== Creative directors ===
- 1919–1968: Cristóbal Balenciaga
- 1987–1992: Michel Goma
- 1992–1997: Josephus Thimister
- 1997–2012: Nicolas Ghesquière
- 2013–2015: Alexander Wang
- 2015–2025: Demna Gvasalia
- 2025–2026: Pierpaolo Piccioli
- 2026: Martine Rose

== See also ==
- Vogue World 2024
