= High Barbaree (film) =

1947 film

- Directed by: Jack Conway
- Written by: Anne Morrison Chapin; Whitfield Cook; Cyril Hume
- Based on: High Barbaree; 1945 novel by Charles Nordhoff; James Norman Hall
- Produced by: Everett Riskin
- Starring: Van Johnson; June Allyson
- Cinematography: Sidney Wagner
- Edited by: Conrad A. Nervig
- Music by: Herbert Stothart
- Production company: Metro-Goldwyn-Mayer
- Distributed by: Loew's Inc.
- Release date: May 1947
- Running time: 91 minutes
- Country: United States
- Language: English
- Budget: $2,173,000
- Box office: $3,083,000

High Barbaree (aka Enchanted Island) is a 1947 American drama war film directed by Jack Conway. It stars Van Johnson and June Allyson, in the third of their six screen pairings. The screenplay based on the novel High Barbaree (1945) by authors Charles Nordhoff and James Norman Hall.

== Plot ==
In Hawaii, during World War II, U.S. Navy pilot Alec Brooke (Van Johnson) commands a flying boat, named the "High Barbaree". During a bombing mission against a Japanese submarine, his PBY Catalina is shot down with all but one of his crew killed, but still able to stay afloat, adrift far from Allied territory. While the crippled aircraft is slowly floating, the two survivors hear the voice of "Tokyo Rose" (Audrey Totter) invoking memories of their past. Alec shares a series of recollections with fellow survivor, Lt. Joe Moore (Cameron Mitchell). His memories concern his boyhood sweetheart in a small Iowa town, Nancy Fraser (June Allyson), now a Navy nurse serving on a ship in the Pacific theater, commanded by his uncle, Capt. Thad Vail (Thomas Mitchell).

Alec and Moore now convert the flying boat into a sailboat by lashing up parachutes as a sail, and head for High Barbaree, a mythical island that his uncle claimed to have once seen in fact. As water supplies dwindle and both men begin to succumb to the conditions, Alec continues his story of a childhood where he had dreamed of becoming a doctor like his father (Henry Hull). After completing the first two years of medical training, he had chosen to become a pilot and rose to the ranks of vice-president of the Case Aviation company, even winning the hand of the boss's daughter (Marilyn Maxwell). When Nancy comes back for a visit, a terrible tornado destroys the company and town, and because his father suffers a broken arm, Alec takes over the emergency medical care of the victims that are in the town auditorium. Nancy, dismayed at his engagement to another woman and his choice of career, leaves as soon as the airport reopens; they lose contact and Alec cannot tell her that he has rethought both decisions.

The coming of war precludes Alec continuing his medical career, and as a pilot in the highly specialized PBY flying boats that harass the Japanese fleets, he is particularly successful until his last mission. After Joe dies, and Alec goes into a coma, High Barbaree seems only a dream when rescue comes at the last moment, as his uncle steers to the location he had once charted and finds Alec. On board, Nancy and the recovering Alec are finally reunited.

== Cast ==
- Van Johnson as Alec Brooke
- June Allyson as Nancy Frazier
- Thomas Mitchell as Capt. Thad Vail
- Marilyn Maxwell as Diana Case
- Cameron Mitchell as Lt. Joe Moore
- Claude Jarman Jr. as Alec (Age 14)
- Henry Hull as Dr. William G. Brooke
- Geraldine Wall as Mrs. Martha Brooke
- Barbara Brown as Della Parkson
- Paul Harvey as John Case
- Charles Evans as Colonel Taylor
- Joan Wells as Nancy (Age 12)
- Audrey Totter as The voice of "Tokyo Rose"
- Jimmy Hunt as Alec - Child (uncredited)
- Gigi Perreau as Nancy - Age 5 (uncredited)
- Paul Newlan as Truckman (uncredited)

The judicious use of combat footage enhanced the production values of High Barbaree.

== Production ==
After a period of inactivity for Van Johnson where he had brooded about his decision not to enlist in World War II, the studio cast him with one of his favorite co-stars, June Allyson, who had been a close friend ever since the pair had performed on Broadway and had been budding stars in Hollywood. Other principal roles such as the father, mother and uncle were ably cast by Hollywood veterans while the significant role of the young Alec was handled by Claude Jarman Jr., the star of The Yearling (1946).

The studio followed the plotline of the original novel which had a "Romeo and Juliet" ending with Allyson's character dying, Johnson hearing that her ship had been sunk, and subsequently dying before he is rescued. When previewed in Los Angeles with this ending, 40% of the audience cards wanted a happy ending with Johnson not dying. A costly $50,000 remake had both of the screen lovers surviving.

The saga of the Consolidated PBY Catalinas flown in the Pacific theater featured predominantly in the film, and were often shown in interiors as well as through the inter-cutting of PBYs in flight from combat footage. These flying boats, first used for reconnaissance and anti-submarine warfare, were also specially modified to operate as night raiders. While location shooting took place at Location filming took place at King City, Arcadia, California, aerial sequences took place at the U.S. Navy's North Island, San Diego, and in the coastal waters off Coronado Island, California with principal photography wrapped on August 14, 1946.

The use of the Ryan Aircraft plant in San Diego as the site for the lead actor's test flying adventures included a lively wringing out of the Stinson L-1 Vigilant (Note: In High Barbaree, the Stinson L-1 Vigilant appears to be hovering and while the Stinson folks bragged that their Stinson L-1 Vigilant could actually accomplish this feat, in a strong headwind, the L-1 could be seen slowly flying backward.) and Ryan ST trainer, flown by Paul Mantz.

Tornado footage from The Wizard of Oz was reused in this film.

== Reception ==
Released at a time when war films had ebbed, the studio marketed High Barbaree as a romantic comedy with the pairing of America's sweethearts. The film was not universally well received as the packaging seemed contrived and the storyline was laboriously drawn out with numerous flashbacks that detracted from the action of the South Pacific air war, where the aerial sequences stood out. Bosley Crowther of The New York Times saw the film as dull and "uninspiring", with a "screenplay from a novel by Nordoff and Hall did not do much more than a blueprint of romantic and sentimental clichés." British film magazine Picturegoer thought 'clichés abound' and that the story was told 'at rather long length and wordily', but praised the performance of Thomas Mitchell as an old seafaring uncle.

=== Box Office ===
The film was a hit, earning $2,231,000 in the US and Canada and $852,000 elsewhere, but because of its high cost recorded a loss to MGM of $149,000.

=== Adaptations ===
On January 24, 1949 Lux Radio Theatre broadcast a 60-minute radio adaptation of the movie with Van Johnson reprising his film role.
