= Claude Jarman Jr. =

American actor (1934–2025)

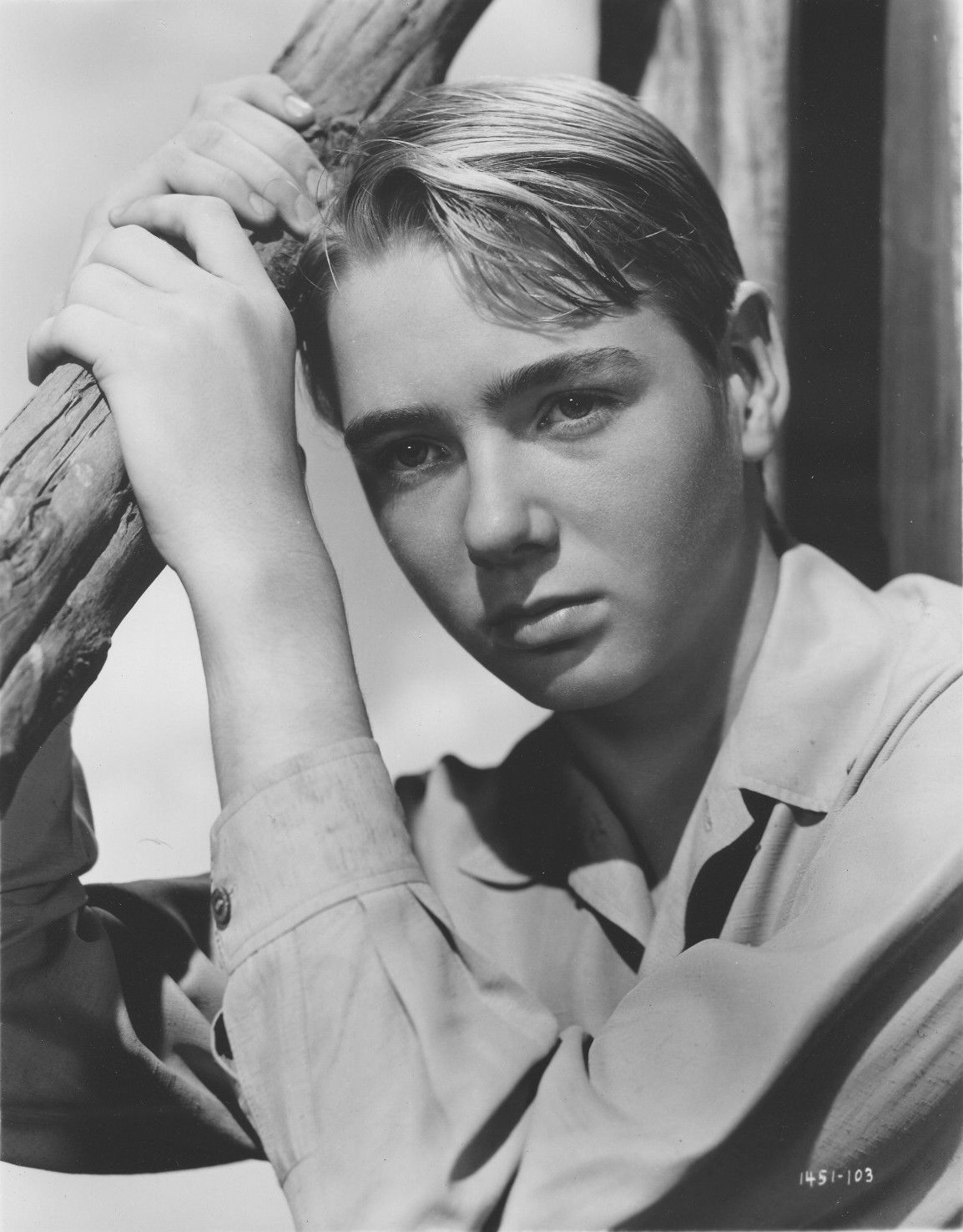
- In Intruder In The Dust (1949)
- Born: Claude Miller Jarman Jr. September 27, 1934; Nashville, Tennessee, U.S.
- Died: January 12, 2025 (aged 90); Kentfield, California, U.S.
- Resting place: Woodlawn Memorial Park, Nashville, Tennessee, U.S.
- Education: Vanderbilt University (B.A.)
- Occupations: Actor; businessman; producer; executive director
- Years active: 1946–1956; 1979
- Spouse(s): Virginia Murray (m. 1958; div. 1968) Maryann de Lichtenberg (m. 1983; div. 1984) Katharine Stuart (m. 1986)
- Children: 7, including Vanessa Getty

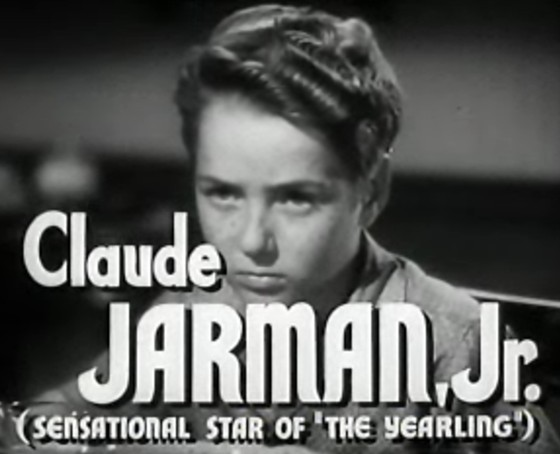
Jarman Jr. in the trailer of the film High Barbaree (1947)

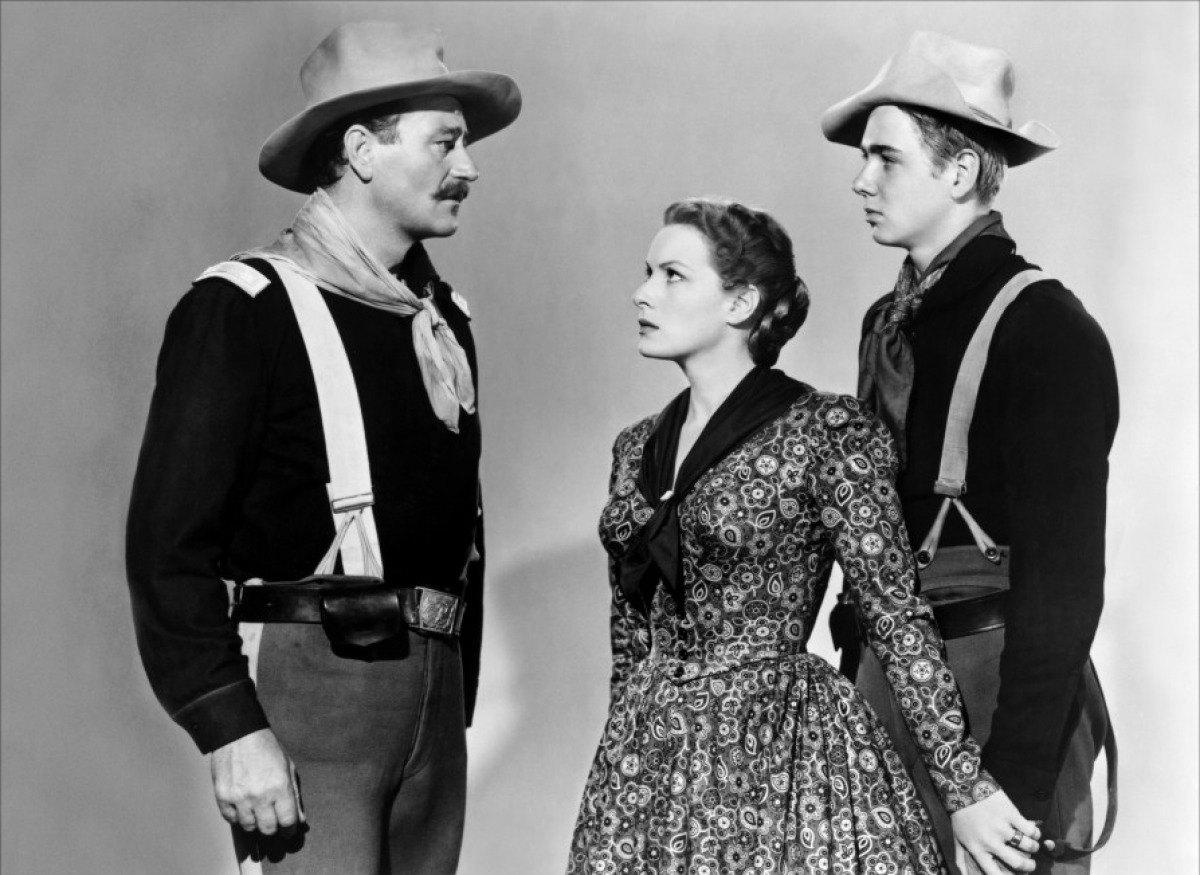
John Wayne, Maureen O'Hara, and Jarman Jr. in Rio Grande (1950)

Claude Miller Jarman Jr. (September 27, 1934 – January 12, 2025) was an American actor. He became a child star with his role as Jody Baxter in The Yearling (1946), for which he won an Academy Juvenile Award. Further roles in films like Intruder in the Dust (1949) and Rio Grande (1950) followed. Jarman largely retired from acting in early adulthood and later served as executive director of the San Francisco International Film Festival, and director of Cultural Affairs for the City of San Francisco.

== Life ==
=== Early life ===
Jarman was born in Nashville, Tennessee, the son of Mildred (Freeman) and Claude Miller Jarman, an accountant for the railroad. As a child, he acted in productions of The Nashville Community Playhouse's Children's Theatre.

=== Child star ===
Jarman was 10 years old and in the fifth grade in Nashville when he was discovered in a nationwide talent search by Metro-Goldwyn-Mayer and was cast as Jody Baxter in the film The Yearling (1946), a high-budget film adaptation of the novel by Marjorie Kinnan Rawlings, in which Gregory Peck and Jane Wyman played his parents. His performance received glowing reviews and, as a result, he received a special Academy Award as outstanding child actor of 1946.

He continued his studies at the MGM studio school, and made a total of 11 films. His second film role was in High Barbaree, playing the younger version of Van Johnson's main character.

Jarman is also notable for his starring role as teenager Chick Mallison in the 1949 William Faulkner adaption Intruder in the Dust, which tackled the subject of racism and segregation in the southern states in an unusually open way for a Hollywood film of that time. In April 1949, he appeared with more than four dozen Hollywood stars in a famous photo to commemorate the 25th anniversary of Metro-Goldwyn-Mayer. At the time of his death, he was the last surviving person from that photo session.

The following year, he had another large role as the son of John Wayne and Maureen O'Hara in John Ford's western Rio Grande. Jarman, who portrayed a young soldier in the film, learned roman riding for the role.

=== Adulthood ===
Republic Studios cast him in a couple of B-movies during the early 1950s, but by the time he reached his early adulthood, his acting career was in decline. He subsequently moved back to Tennessee to finish college at Vanderbilt University. Following coursework in pre-law at Vanderbilt, Jarman appeared in Disney's The Great Locomotive Chase (1956), his final movie. After that, he served three years in the U.S. Navy, doing public relations work.

Jarman moved to working behind the scenes. He ran the San Francisco International Film Festival for 15 years (1965–1980) and was known for his in-depth retrospectives of movie stars and directors. He was executive producer of the music documentary film Fillmore (1972), about rock impresario Bill Graham.

Jarman briefly returned to acting in 1978, for the television miniseries Centennial. He was a special guest at the 70th and 75th Academy Award telecasts, in 1998 and 2003 respectively, as a past acting award winner at the Oscar Family Album retrospectives.

Jarman served as director of cultural affairs for the City of San Francisco. He founded Jarman Travel Inc. in 1986 to serve the travel needs of corporations and executives.

Jarman wrote My Life and the Final Days of Hollywood, which was published in 2018.

== Personal life and death ==
Jarman married his first wife, Virginia, in 1959. They had three children: Elizabeth Suddeth, Claude Jarman III, and Murray Jarman, before their 1968 divorce. Jarman met his second wife, Maryann, in 1968. They had two daughters together, Vanessa Getty and Natalie Jarman, before their 1983 divorce. Jarman married his third wife, Katharine, in 1986, with whom he had twin daughters, Charlotte and Sarah. Jarman died at his home in Kentfield, California, on January 12, 2025, at the age of 90. He is buried at Woodlawn Memorial Park in Nashville, Tennessee.

== Filmography ==
Year	Film	Role	Other notes
1946	The Yearling	Jody	Academy Juvenile Award
1947	High Barbaree	Alec (age 14)	
1949	Intruder in the Dust	Chick Mallison	
1949	Roughshod	Steve Phillips	
1949	The Sun Comes Up	Jerry	
1950	Rio Grande	Trooper Jefferson "Jeff" Yorke	John Wayne's son
1950	The Outriders	Roy Gort	
1951	Inside Straight	Rip MacCool (age 16)	
1952	Hangman's Knot	Jamie Groves	
1953	Fair Wind to Java	Chess	
1956	The Great Locomotive Chase	Jacob Parrott	Andrews' Raiders USA: TV title
1979	Centennial	Earl Grebe	"The Winds of Death" – TV miniseries episode
