= Hangman's Knot =

1952 film by Roy Huggins

- Theatrical poster
- Directed by: Roy Huggins
- Written by: Roy Huggins
- Produced by: Harry Joe Brown
- Starring: Randolph Scott; Donna Reed; Claude Jarman
- Cinematography: Charles Lawton Jr.
- Edited by: Gene Havlick
- Color process: Technicolor
- Production company: Scott-Brown Productions
- Distributed by: Columbia Pictures
- Release dates: November 26, 1952 (Los Angeles); December 10, 1952 (New York)
- Running time: 81 minutes
- Country: United States
- Language: English
- Box office: $1.25 million (U.S. rentals)

Hangman's Knot is a 1952 American Western film written and directed by Roy Huggins and starring Randolph Scott, Donna Reed and Claude Jarman. The plot concerns a group of Confederate soldiers, unaware that the Civil War has ended, who intercept a shipment of gold escorted by Union cavalry troops and are then pursued by a renegade posse.

== Plot ==
In the spring of 1865 in Nevada, a small band of Confederate soldiers disguised as civilians intercept a shipment of gold bars that is being escorted through the eastern slopes of the Sierra Nevada mountains by Union cavalry troops. Following a heated battle that kills all of the Union soldiers, Confederate major Matt Stewart learns from a dying Union officer that the war had ended a month earlier. Stewart and his men transport the gold as planned to the scheduled rendezvous with Captain Petersen, who has been scouting the area disguised as a traveling peddler. When Petersen confirms that he knew that the war had ended, hot-headed Rolph Bainter shoots him dead. Major Stewart decides that they will take the gold bars to the South to help finance their country's reconstruction.

Stewart disguises himself and uses Petersen's covered wagon to transport the gold and his men from the area. They are stopped by a group of drifters posing as a posse looking for the gold thieves. Stewart persuades the leader, Quincey, that the thieves have been caught elsewhere. Stewart and his men trudge forward, but the mules bolt from the wagon and the rebels commandeer a stagecoach carrying former Union war nurse Molly Hull and her companion Lee Kemper.

Quincey's posse chases the stagecoach to a station house in the Sierras, capturing one of Stewart's men, Cass Browne, whom they take with them. Stewart and his men take the stage passengers, the station agent, Plunkett and his daughter, Margaret Harris, as hostages. Harris hates the Confederates because her son and husband were killed in the war. The posse surrounds the station house and Stewart tells that them the gold is on the trail, but they are reluctant to return unless they are sure of it. As night descends, the posse tries to lure the Confederates by threatening to hang Cass, but Stewart rescues him with dynamite.

Kemper offers Stewart a plan of escape in exchange for two gold bars. Giving Stewart an Indian token, Kemper explains that his good trading relationship with the local Paiute Indians and the token will guarantee fresh horses and safe passage from the territory. Later, Rolph tries to rape Molly but is stopped by Stewart, who beats him in a fistfight. When Rolph tries to shoot Stewart, young Jamie Groves shoots him dead and Molly shows her feelings for Stewart.

During the night, Quincey and his men have been digging a short tunnel under the station house. Just when they reach a trap door in the floor, Cass stops them from entering. Frustrated, Quincey orders his men to torch the roof of the station house. Kemper tries to escape with his two gold bars and is shot dead by the posse. When Cass sneaks outside to scatter the posse's horses, he is also killed. As Stewart and Jamie prepare to escape, Molly begs Stewart not to take the gold. Outside in the chaos of a rainstorm, Quincey and his men begin shooting at one another. Believing that Stewart had told the truth about the location of the gold, the members of the posse race each other into the night.

With the posse departed, Stewart and Jamie surrender the gold bars to Plunkett. Margaret and Plunkett offer a home to young Jamie, who promises that he will return. Major Stewart promises Molly that he will return to her after he is repatriated in Virginia, and they embrace.

== Cast ==
- Randolph Scott as Major Matt Stewart
- Donna Reed as Molly Hull
- Claude Jarman, Jr. as Jamie Groves
- Frank Faylen as Cass Browne
- Richard Denning as Lee Kemper
- Lee Marvin as Rolph Bainter
- Glenn Langan as Captain Petersen
- Jeanette Nolan as Mrs. Margaret Harris
- Clem Bevans as Plunkett
- Ray Teal as Quincey
- Guinn Williams as Smitty
- Monte Blue as Maxwell
- John Call as Egan Walsh
- Edward Earle as Union Captain (uncredited)

== Reception ==
In a contemporary review for The New York Times, critic A. H. Weiler called the film a "taut, action-filled adventure" and wrote:

The Western, a movie staple often misused and maligned through stereotyped production, is given handsome, credible and edifying treatment in "Hangman's' Knot," a taut, action-filled adventure sensibly designed to keep the devotees—especially the older ones—from yawning. For the producers ... obviously were aware that motion pictures should move, and their robust drama wastes few words and very often digs into the character of its principals to give genuine substance to the brisk action of the story. And, since Technicolor always enhances a rugged Western scene, the producers seem to have guessed right on that score, too.

The Los Angeles Times wrote: "The perennial soldier-cowboy hero, Randolph Scott, heads the cast or this one and proves so noble that it hurts. ... Action fans should relish the goings on. There's an abundance of shooting and other types of fighting, a terrific storm and some spectacular Technicolor photography."

== See also ==
- List of American films of 1952
