= Roughshod (1949 film) =

1949 Western film by Mark Robson

- Theatrical release poster
- Directed by: Mark Robson
- Written by: Story: Peter Viertel; Screenplay: Hugo Butler; Daniel Mainwaring
- Produced by: Richard H. Berger
- Starring: Robert Sterling; Gloria Grahame; John Ireland; Claude Jarman Jr.
- Cinematography: Joseph Biroc
- Edited by: Marston Fay
- Music by: Roy Webb
- Distributed by: RKO Radio Pictures, Inc.
- Release date: June 16, 1949 (U.S.)
- Running time: 88 minutes
- Country: United States
- Language: English

Roughshod is a 1949 black-and-white Western film starring Robert Sterling and Gloria Grahame and directed by Mark Robson.

== Plot ==
Three escaped convicts in prison garb, led by cold-blooded killer Lednov, ambush and murder three cowboys, taking their clothes and firearms. They burn their prison garb in the smoldering camp fire, and the trio quickly rides on seeking revenge against a rancher named Clay Phillips, who once dogged Lednov all the way to Mexico and wounded him before turning him over to American authorities for a previous crime. Phillips is warned by friend Jed Graham to get out of Aspen.

Early thirtyish Clay and young teenage brother Steve, are headed toward Sonora with a small herd of horses - which is all they've got. They come across four stranded "women of the night," saloon girls that the townsfolks had sent packing. Led by take-charge Mary, the four women are stuck on the Sonora trail with a broken wagon wheel.

A lovestruck local cowboy turns up to take Marcia back and marry her, over his parents' objections. Elaine, who is sick and evidently pregnant, flees when she hears Clay is leading the group to the nearest ranch to leave the girls in its owners' care. Steve corrals her and they continue on. To heartbreak, recrimination, and tentative reconciliation, it turns out Elaine is the Wyatts' runaway daughter. Her father yields to his wife's compassion, but orders the other women to leave. Mary upbraids Clay for his narrow-mindedness, acknowledging that he can't think past his idealized future, of a Simon-pure dream wife in a spotted gingham dress.

Clay reluctantly accepts the pair again as passengers, and softens somewhat towards Mary as he accedes to her teaching his illiterate brother how to read along the way. Following an old alternate trail to avoid the outlaws, they run into an indignant Irish miner, who claims they're after his claim. Upon seeing his cache of gold, Helen decides he's a better prospect than what lies ahead in Sonora.

Another amorous entanglement between Clay and Mary breaks down again in argument over his inability to look beyond her past. Her pride injured again, she flees recklessly in his wagon. With the men in pursuit it jolts loose from its team and plummets down a riverbank. Clay reflexively charges into the water to retrieve Mary. Some of her finery begins to float downstream, leading to yelping at the loss. Once more Clay's caring impulses suffer a jarring reversal. His resolve to put her on the next stage redoubles.

While they wrangle Lednov spies Mary's frillery, which leads him onto the group's trail. En route the outlaws come upon the miner's camp that night. Lednov shoots and kills the Irishman. He then turns on Helen, clearly intent on having his way with her. Recoiling from his stare, the chilling prospect of the desires of all three men are captured in her eyes. She is never seen again.

The next morning Clay flags down a passing coach. He hides his protectiveness and intentions, behind a brusque goodbye to Mary. That afternoon the brothers reach their ranch, no more than a patch of grass and a makeshift horse corral. Knowing what lies ahead, Clay instigates a confrontation with Steve in hopes to spare Steve a likely death in the ensuing gunfight to follow. But before Steve leaves, he sees the gang approaching and stays to fight it out with his brother. Clay manages to kill the two wingmen, but Steve is shot and wounded by Lednov. Clay then circles round and shoots down Lednov.

Clay rushes Steve to the nearest doctor, who patches up the young man. Mary is there, alongside the doc, holding a lamp. Clay and Mary soon embrace, and after an empassioned kiss, Clay wonders aloud if he might find some gingham in town for Mary's new dress.

== Cast ==
- Robert Sterling as Clay Phillips
- Gloria Grahame as Mary Wells
- Claude Jarman, Jr. as Steve Phillips
- John Ireland as Lednov
- Jeff Donnell as Elaine Wyatt
- Myrna Dell as Helen Carter
- Martha Hyer as Marcia
- George Cooper as Jim Clayton
- Jeff Corey as Jed Graham
- Sara Haden as Ma Wyatt
- James Bell as Pa Wyatt
- Sean McClory (aka, Shawn McGlory) as Fowler
- Robert Williams as McCall
- Steve Savage as Peters
- Ed Cassidy as Sheriff Gardner

== Reception ==
The film recorded a loss of $550,000.
