= Rio Grande (1950 film) =

1950 film by John Ford

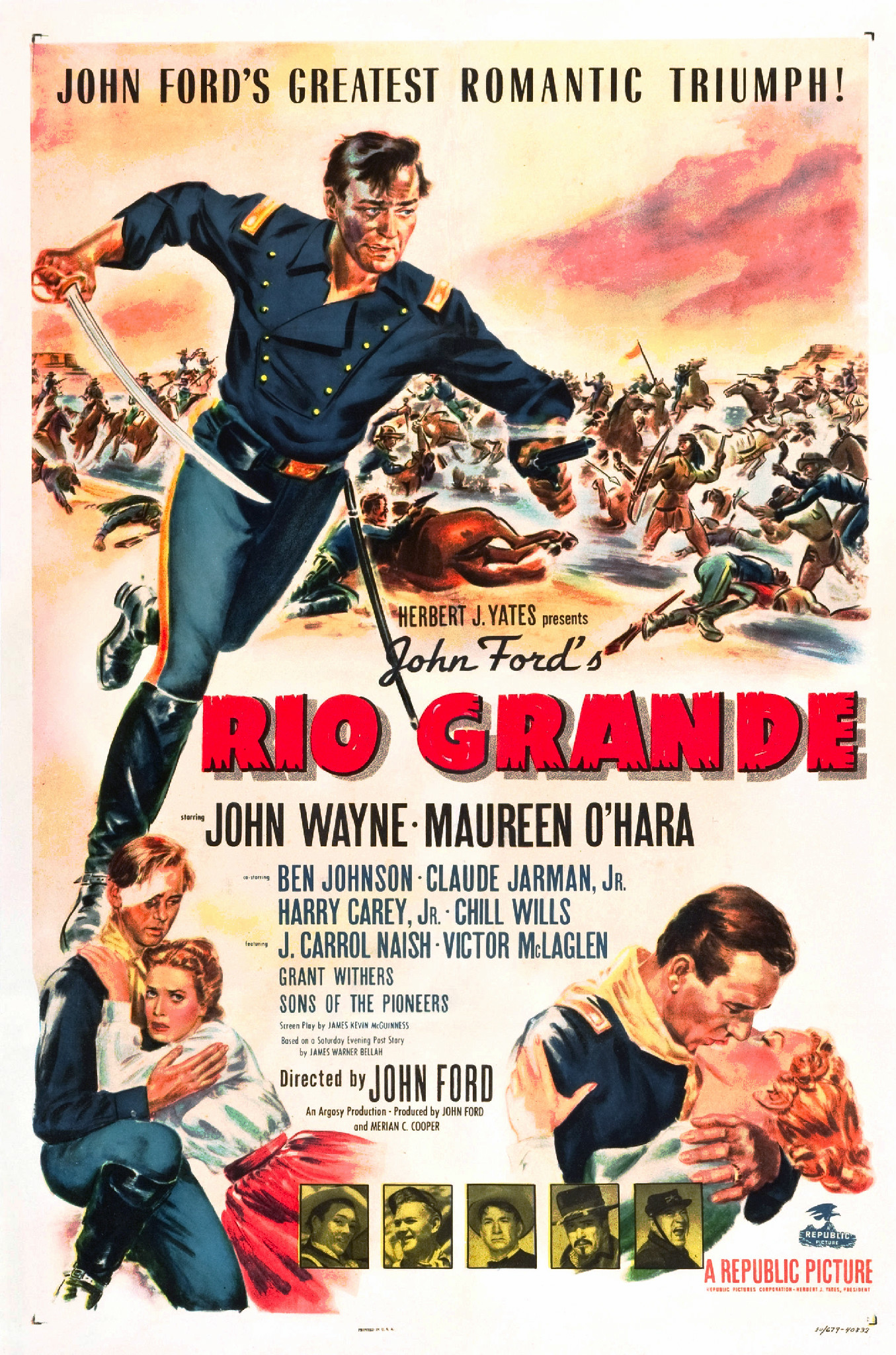
- Theatrical poster
- Directed by: John Ford
- Screenplay by: James Kevin McGuinness
- Based on: Mission With No Record; 1947 story The Saturday Evening Post by James Warner Bellah
- Produced by: Uncredited: Merian C. Cooper; John Ford
- Starring: John Wayne; Maureen O'Hara; Ben Johnson; Claude Jarman Jr.; Harry Carey Jr.; Chill Wills; J. Carrol Naish; Victor McLaglenn; Grant Withers; Sons of the Pioneers
- Cinematography: Bert Glennon
- Edited by: Jack Murray
- Music by: Victor Young
- Production companies: Republic Pictures; Argosy Pictures
- Distributed by: Republic Pictures
- Release date: November 15, 1950
- Running time: 105 minutes
- Country: United States
- Language: English
- Budget: $1,214,899 or $1,511,043
- Box office: $2.25 million (US rentals)

Rio Grande is a 1950 American romantic Western film directed by John Ford and starring John Wayne and Maureen O'Hara. It is the third installment of Ford's "Cavalry Trilogy", following two RKO Pictures releases: Fort Apache (1948) and She Wore a Yellow Ribbon (1949). Wayne plays the lead in all three films, as Captain Kirby York in Fort Apache, then as Captain Nathan Brittles in She Wore a Yellow Ribbon, and finally as a promoted Lieutenant Colonel Kirby Yorke in Rio Grande. (Note: scripts and production billing spell the York[e] character's surname differently in Fort Apache and Rio Grande) Rio Grande's supporting cast features Ben Johnson, Claude Jarman Jr., Harry Carey Jr., Chill Wills, J. Carrol Naish, Victor McLaglen, Grant Withers, the Western singing group the Sons of the Pioneers and Stan Jones.

While originally Ford was uninterested in directing another Western, his studio wouldn't permit him to start The Quiet Man until he directed Rio Grande. The script was based on a short story by James Warner Bellah, which was inspired by historical events. The film was shot in only 32 days in Monument Valley, Utah. After its release, it made a modest profit, with reviewers praising the music and the action, but noting that the themes were well-worn. Later reviews praised the natural beauty of the shooting location, but were mixed about its efficacy. The film can be read as anticipating the frustration with international borders the US military would experience in the Vietnam War, with the solution to ignore international borders reflecting the conservative politics of Bellah and scriptwriter James Kevin McGuinness. The film is one of the least sympathetic of Ford's Westerns to Native Americans, depicting them as bloodthirsty and villainous. In contrast to its one-sided portrayal of Native Americans, its treatment of the reconciliation of an estranged couple and their son is emotionally complex. Rio Grande also addresses issues of class, showing a rejection of class privilege common in Ford's work.

== Plot ==
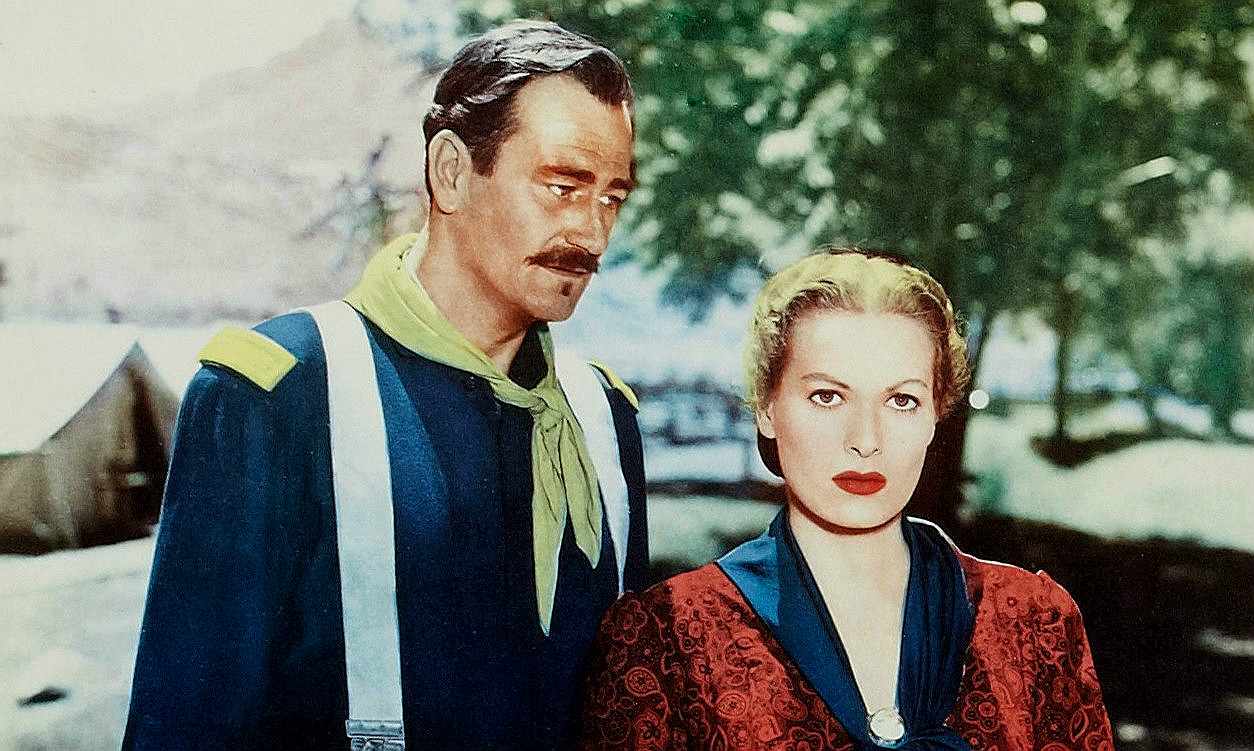
John Wayne and Maureen O'Hara

In the summer of 1879, Lieutenant Colonel Kirby Yorke is posted on the Texas frontier in command of the 2nd U.S. Cavalry Regiment to defend settlers against attacks by marauding Apaches. Yorke has just captured the Apache's leader. Apaches have been using Mexico as a sanctuary from pursuit, and the regiment is suffering from a serious shortage of troops.

Yorke has been estranged from his wife and son for 15 years, after he set fire to his wife's family's plantation in the South under orders from his commanding officer during the Shenandoah Valley campaign of the American Civil War. Yorke's son, Trooper Jefferson (Jeff) Yorke, is one of 18 recruits sent to the regiment. After failing mathematics and flunking out of West Point, he immediately enlisted as a private in the Army. In a meeting with his father, Yorke informs him that he will receive no special treatment in the brutal way of life he has chosen; Jeff declares he wants none. Through his willingness to undergo any test or trial, Jeff befriends Travis Tyree and Daniel "Sandy" Boone, as well as the long-serving career troopers of the regiment. Tyree is on the run from the law for killing a man, but wants to wait to go to trial until after his sister's wedding. Yorke's estranged wife, Kathleen, arrives unexpectedly to buy the underage Jeff out of his enlistment. In a showdown with his mother, Jeff refuses her attempt to buy him out of the Army. The struggle over their son's future rekindles the romance the couple once felt for each other.

The Apaches attack the fort one night. Many of them are killed by the awakened troopers, but they succeed in freeing their leader. When Yorke's patrol reaches the Rio Grande, too late to capture the Apaches he was following, he meets a Mexican patrol. Yorke and the Mexican lieutenant in command exchange military courtesies, and both confirm that the US troops cannot cross into Mexico.

Yorke is visited by his former Civil War commander, Philip Sheridan, now Commanding General of the Military Division of the Missouri, the headquarters responsible for pacifying the Great Plains. Sheridan has decided to order Yorke to cross the Rio Grande into Mexico in pursuit of the Apaches and kill them all, an action with serious political implications. Sheridan promises that if Yorke draws a court-martial as a result of the orders Sheridan legally cannot give him, he will ensure that the members of the court will be his fellow soldiers from the Civil War. Yorke accepts the assignment.

Before Yorke leads his men toward Mexico, he sends the women and children to Ft. Bliss for safety, with an escort including Jeff. Jeff and Boone meet Tyree, who has gone Absent Without Leave to evade a Texas marshal who is looking for him. Tyree informs them that there are Apaches in the area. The Apaches attack the wagons and capture the one carrying the children and Corporal Bell's wife. The braves kill some of the escorting cavalry. While the remainder fends off the Apaches, Jeff returns to the fort for reinforcements. Tyree saves him from an Apache attack on the way.

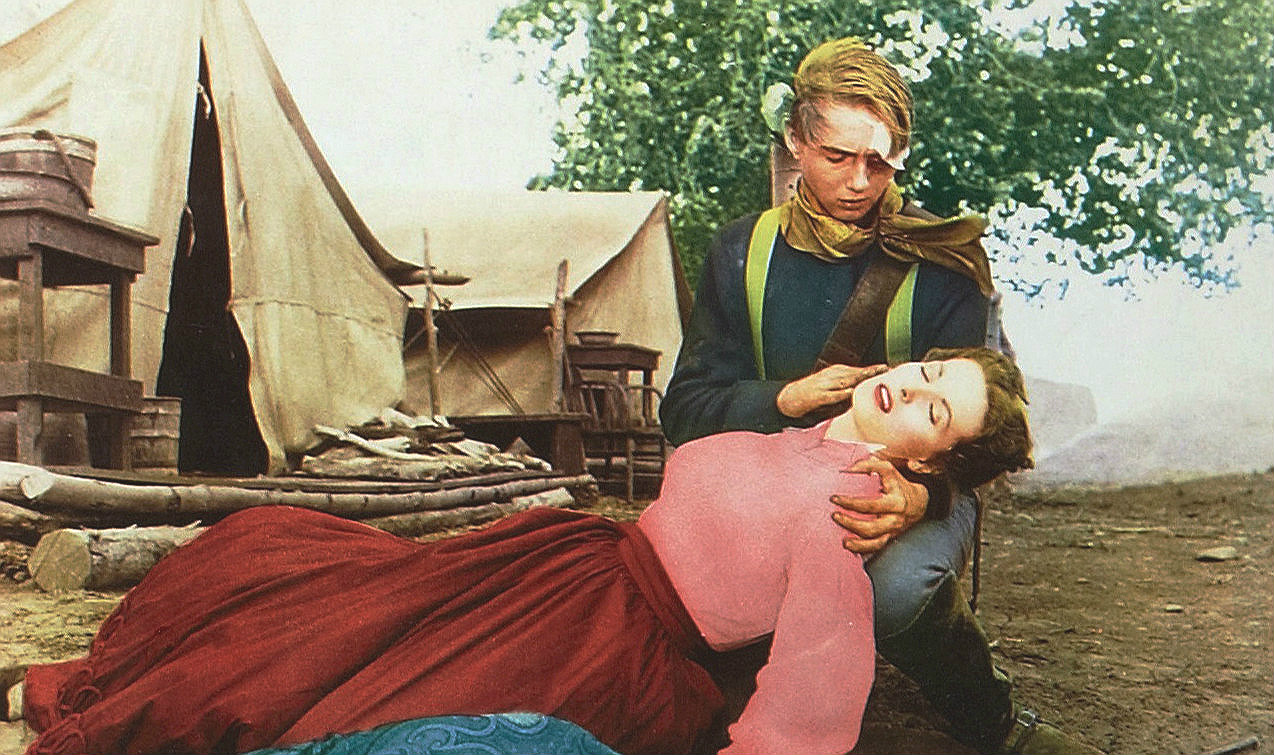
O'Hara and Jarman Jr.

The Second meets the survivors of the escort and follows the Apache raiders. They discover the burnt-out wagon and the body of Corporal Bell's wife, but there is no sign of the children. In the meantime, Tyree rejoins the regiment and tells them he trailed the Apaches to their hideout in Mexico. Working with Tyree, Yorke permits three troopers, Tyree, Boone, and Jeff, to infiltrate the village where the Apaches have taken the children. Then Yorke leads his regiment in an all-out attack. The cavalrymen rescue all of the children unharmed, though Colonel Yorke is wounded by an arrow that he orders Jeff to remove. He is taken back to the fort by his victorious troops, where Kathleen meets him and holds his hand as he is carried on a travois into the post.

After Colonel Yorke recovers, Troopers Tyree, Boone, Jeff, Corporal Bell, and Indian Scout Son of Many Mules are decorated. At the ceremony, when one of the Texas marshals reappears Trooper Tyree continues his run from the law, stealing General Sheridan's horse for the purpose. As the troops pass in review, the regimental band plays Dixie at the General's request, apparently to please Mrs. Yorke.

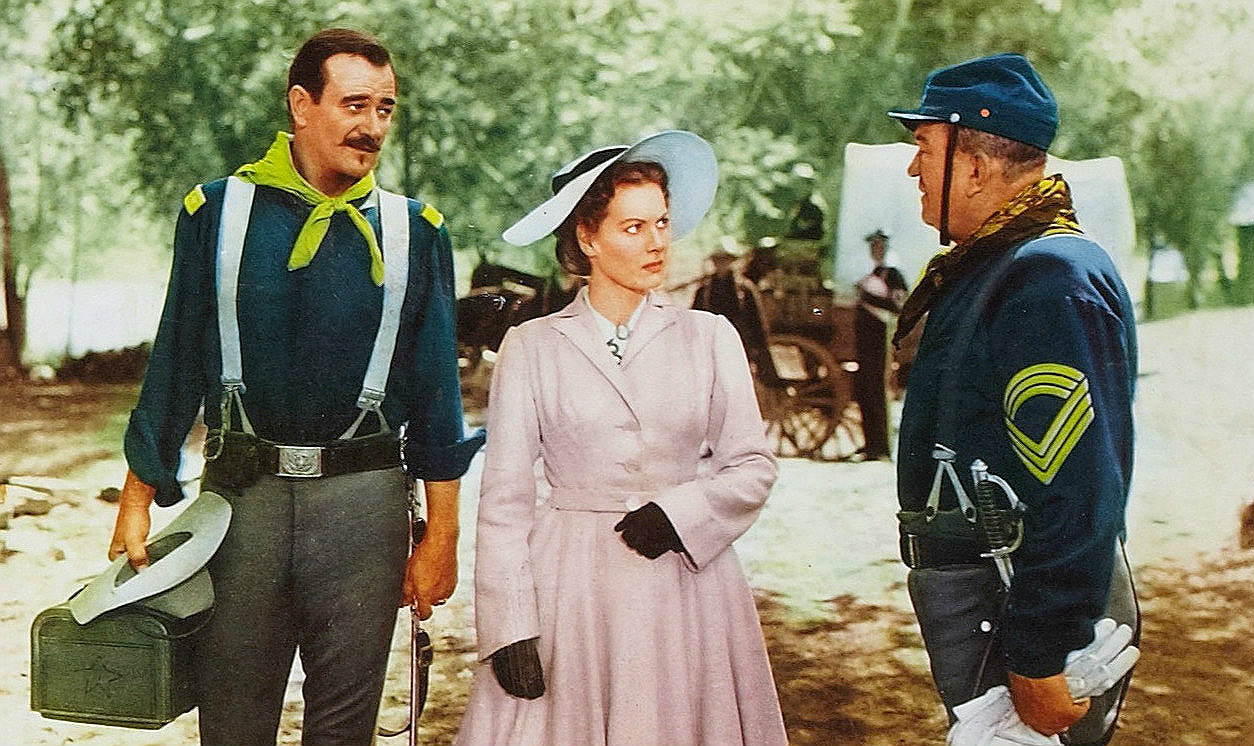
Wayne, O'Hara and McLaglen

== Cast ==
- John Wayne as Lieutenant Colonel Kirby Yorke
- Maureen O'Hara as Kathleen Yorke
- Ben Johnson as Trooper Travis Tyree
- Claude Jarman Jr. as Trooper Jefferson Yorke
- Harry Carey Jr. as Trooper Daniel "Sandy" Boone
- Chill Wills as Dr. Wilkins, Regimental Surgeon
- J. Carrol Naish as General Philip Sheridan
- Victor McLaglen as Sergeant Major Quincannon
- Grant Withers as Deputy Marshal
- Sons of the Pioneers as the Regimental Singers
  - Ken Curtis as the lead singer of the Regimental Singers
  - Shug Fisher as Regimental Singer and regimental bugler
- Peter Ortiz as Captain St. Jacques
- Steve Pendleton as Captain Prescott
- Karolyn Grimes as Margaret Mary
- Alberto Morin as Mexican Lieutenant
- Stan Jones as Sergeant
- Fred Kennedy as Trooper Heinze

== Production ==
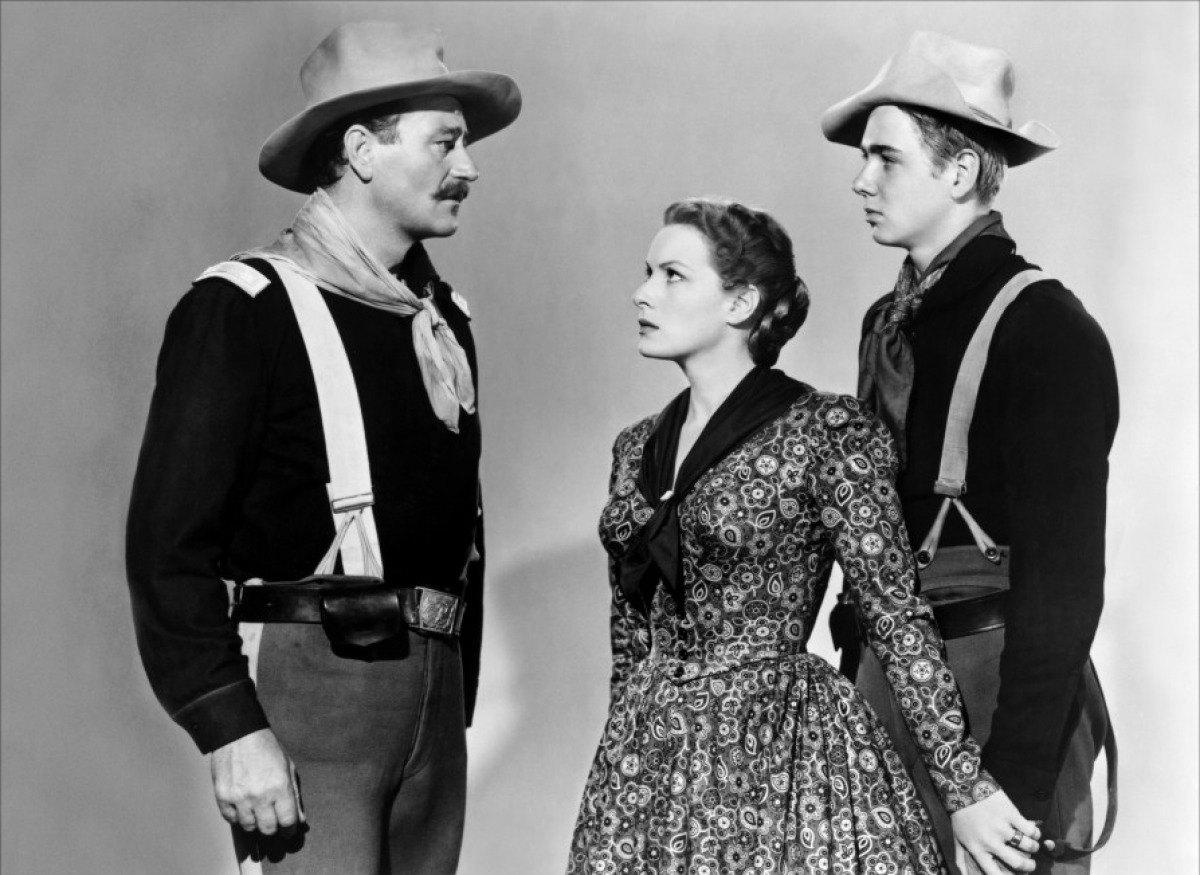
John Wayne, Maureen O'Hara and Claude Jarman Jr. in Rio Grande

=== Background ===
With the completion of Wagon Master, Ford did not want to make another Western. Instead, he wanted to film the Ireland-set romantic comedy-drama film The Quiet Man with Wayne and Maureen O'Hara, but Herbert Yates, the studio president of Republic Pictures, insisted that Ford first make Rio Grande with the same pairing of Wayne and O'Hara because he thought the script of The Quiet Man was weak and that the story was of little general interest. Yates insisted that Rio Grande be made before The Quiet Man, to offset the anticipated losses on that film. When The Quiet Man was eventually released in 1952, though, it vastly out-performed Rio Grande by grossing $3.8 million in its first year and giving Yates and Republic Pictures one of the top-10 hits of the year.

=== Writing ===
The script for Rio Grande was written by Irish-born screenwriter James Kevin McGuinness. It is based on a short story "Mission With No Record" by James Bellah that appeared in The Saturday Evening Post on September 27, 1947. McGuinness had been working at MGM as a story editor, and either resigned or was fired for his extremely conservative politics. Patrick Ford, John Ford's son, reported that many of the long speeches that McGuinness included in his script were cut in the final filming, and that many scenes were improvised. McGuinness based his story on a specific raid by the 4th Cavalry Regiment (United States) in May 1873. Colonel Ranald Mackenzie, under orders from General Phil Sheridan, crossed the border to fight Kickapoo people, and kidnapped some of their women and children to hold as hostages. This was illegal, and the Mexican government protested. McGuinness made several changes to the original story on Ford's request. He made the main character more sympathetic and less ruthless. There are also differences between the film and the historical events. In the film, Apache kidnap white American women and children, but in the historical event, members of the 4th Cavalry regiment kidnapped Kickapoo women and children. In the film, the Mexican officer seems relieved that Yorke helped to kill Native Americans; in the historical event, the Mexican government protested the raid as a violation of their international border.

During filming, the film was called Rio Bravo and then Rio Grande Command until right before release.

=== Casting ===
Skilled stuntman and rodeo star Ben Johnson played his third credited role in Rio Grande. The stunt where he rides two horses "Roman style", standing on the backs of two separate horses, took three weeks to master.

Rio Grande was the first of three films directed by Ford starring the pairing of John Wayne and Maureen O'Hara, followed by The Quiet Man in 1952 and The Wings of Eagles in 1957. Wayne and O'Hara also starred together in McLintock! (1963) and Big Jake (1971).

=== Filming ===
The film was shot entirely on location in Monument Valley near Moab, Utah. Archie Stout was the second-unit director and Bert Glennon also helped with cinematography. O'Hara recalled that the weather was so hot that production crew dug a pit covered by a tarp to have a cooler resting place.

The location shoot, which Harry Carey described as a "vacation" picture, was shot in just 32 days, with 665 takes of 646 setups. O'Hara recalled that Ford insulted and belittled Wayne frequently on set. While those who knew Ford were accustomed to his abusive behavior, Claude Jarman, another newcomer to the Ford set, felt like the cast was scared and "you never knew what [Ford] was going to do."

Ford wanted the military aspects of the film to be realistic. The film uses the conical Sibley tents that were used then, as well as Primus stoves. Actors were not permitted to wash their cavalry uniforms to ensure that they looked dusty and lived-in.

=== Music ===
The film contains folk songs led by the Sons of the Pioneers, one of whom is Ken Curtis (Ford's future son-in-law). Studio president Yates insisted that the group appear in the film. Ford disliked being forced to use them, and how they appeared incongruous with cavalrymen. Victor Young wrote the score. On the music, Ford biographer and film critic Scott Eyman said there was too much of it, but that it "gives the film an air of plaintive longing."

== Reception ==
Rio Grande cost 1.2 million dollars to make, and earned 2 million dollars. Its net profit was $215,634. A review by New York Times described it as a "familiar story" that "travels a well-rutted road" but that "the horsemanship never was better". It was also noted for its similarities to the 1935 epic-adventure film The Lives of a Bengal Lancer. Praise was given, though, for the Western-style ballads sung by the Sons of the Pioneers. William Brogdon at Variety summarized the film as "big brawling mass action clashes, mixed together with a substantial portion of good, honest sentiment" which predict box office success.

Garry Wills's 1997 book, John Wayne's America, called Rio Grande the "most beautifully filmed" of the Cavalry trilogy. He attributed this to the landscape in Moab, the sensitivity of the cinematographers, and intimate tent scenes that emphasize emotion on actors' faces. In a 2017 book on Wayne and Ford's films and friendship, Nancy Schoenberger conceded that Ford considered Rio Grande a "throwaway" film and that critics consider it the weakest of the Cavalry trilogy. Schoenberger wrote that the film "may be the most beautiful and most compelling" because of its setting. Eyman wrote that the film "lacks the depth of feeling Ford infused into the other two cavalry pictures," possibly because he wasn't passionate about creating the film and saw it as an obstacle to surmount before starting on The Quiet Man.

== Themes ==
=== Political and racial ===
While films about the British Empire had been popular in the 1930s, they often featured military conflict with colonized people. After World War II started, the Office of War Information discouraged British Empire films about India, because the United States needed their help in the war, and films sympathetic to the British could have alienated India. For this and other reasons, Westerns became even more popular in the 1940s. For Richard Slotkin, Westerns like Rio Grande produced after World War II were a way to transfer "the ideological concerns" of the war "to the mythic landscape of the Western." In contrast to earlier Westerns, which emphasized a lone ranger, Slotkin described Yorke's leadership style as "professionally irregular": enforcing discipline and the chain of command while adapting to the changing needs of war.

In a biography of John Wayne, authors Randy Roberts and James S. Olson analyze the success of Rio Grande, alluding to consensus that it was the weakest film in the cavalry trilogy. They related the film's central conflict of "the frustration of diplomatic niceties and the untenable nature of borders" to the beginning of the Korean War, which involved American soldiers defending against Chinese attackers in North Korea. In the film, the frustration is resolved by attacking Apaches in Mexico. Roberts and Olson wrote that this solution reflected the conservative politics of Bellah and McGuinness, who believed that America's enemies who kill innocent people should be pursued into neutral countries if they take refuge there. In a book on Ford, Wayne, and Ward Bond, Scott Allen Nollen also noticed that Rio Grande's "reactionary attitude toward Apaches as simplistic savages reflect[ed]" the "arch-conservative" views of McGuinness. In a biography of John Ford, Joseph McBride saw Rio Grande as an "early-warning allegory of the Korean War" that expressed Ford's "anti-Communist feelings". Richard Slotkin, in his book on the frontier myth in America, also noticed anti-Communist parallels. He wrote that the river in Rio Grande is "a Yalu or Iron Curtain, which can only be crossed in arms for battles of rescue and/or annihilation."

The depiction of Native Americans in Rio Grande was very negative. Frank Nugent had previously written scripts for Ford's westerns, and his treatment of Native Americans was sympathetic. McGuinness, in contrast, was not. Joseph Breen, acting under the Production Code Administration, said the script was "blatantly racist" and asked the producers to cut some of the more egregious lines, which they did. While the description of the Apache as "a scourge" was purged, the violent actions of the Apache remained in the film. The bodies of the victims are not shown on-screen, allowing viewers to assume the worst. Filmmaker Kathleen McDonough believed that the negative depiction of Native Americans showed a diminished hope for world peace after World War II. The theme of "becoming savage in order to defeat savages" anticipated a common conflict in films about the Vietnam War.

=== Masculinity and family relationships ===
Rio Grande, while a western, involves family drama, which is unusual in a genre associated with male friendship and mobility. Russell Meeuf, a journalism professor at the University of Idaho, wrote on 1950s masculinity in the Cavalry trilogy. McBride called it Ford's first "mature love story," where the "emotionally complex family drama [...] elevat[es] Rio Grande above its crudely racist and stridently jingoistic military plot." For Classical Hollywood film scholars Gaylyn Studlar and Matthew Bernstein, the emotional theme for both Kathleen and Yorke is that they "must confront and resolve the tension between the demands of duty and the love of family." Ultimately, to survive on the frontier, a man needs not just endurance, but also "the comfort of family."

McBride saw Ford's sensitive treatment of Jeff as a possible sign of "self-recrimination over his coldhearted treatment of Pat" (Ford's own son). The ending of the film shows Kathleen performing household chores and waiting with the other wives to show that she is returning to stay with Yorke, which McBride calls "emotionally compelling despite its (qualified) sexism." When Yorke returns, injured on a stretcher, Kathleen publicly walks alongside him, holding his hand, making her decision to stay with him one that includes the entire fort community, where women share in suffering while their husbands fight. While Kathleen's role is limited, she still represents a greater feminine presence than in many other westerns, such as those by Howard Hawks, Anthony Mann, or John Sturges.

Rio Grande's western family drama shows, for Meeuf, "the dynamic tensions of the balance between masculine adventurism and a settled domestic existence". Schoenberger noticed that the relationship between Yorke and his abandoned son Jeff was characterized by on-screen pain. Yorke allows a fistfight between Jeff and a stronger man to continue so Jeff can try to prove himself. Later, when Yorke is shot by an Apache arrow, he asks Jeff to take it out, "a feat that takes physical strength and an unflinching ability to inflict pain on a loved one in order to save his life."

=== Class ===
Meeuf also looks at the treatment of class in the Cavalry trilogy. Kathleen initially wants to take her son back home with her so that he can be tutored in mathematics (the subject he failed) and return to West Point, where he can get a commission as an officer. This represents her expectations for her son as an upper-class woman. Yorke calls this attitude "special privilege for special born," and he prefers that their son Jeff work his way up from an enlisted trooper by proving himself as a man and soldier. Kathleen yields to his preference, although for Meeuf, this "borders on the far-fetched." Still, the rejection of class privilege for the adventure of life in the West is a common theme in Ford's work. For Wills, Kathleen represented lingering unrest from the Civil War, whose resentment faded as she saw the man who ordered her family home to be burned during the Civil War take part in the fort's society. Tyree, also a southerner, demonstrated collaboration with northerners.

== Accolades ==
The film was recognized by the American Film Institute in 2008: AFI's 10 Top 10: Nominated Western film. It was one of 50 films nominated for the top 10 best Westerns.

== See also ==
- John Wayne filmography

== Works cited ==
- Eyman, Scott (2000). Print the legend: the life & times of John Ford. Baltimore London: J. Hopkins University Press. ISBN 0684811618.
- McDonough, Kathleen A. (2009). "Wee Willie Winkie Goes West: The Influence of the British Empire Genre on Ford's Cavalry Trilogy". In Rollins, Peter C.; O'Conner, John E. (eds.). Hollywood's West: the American frontier in film, television, and history. Lexington, Kentucky: The University Press of Kentucky. ISBN 978-0813123547.
- Meeuf, Russell (2013). John Wayne's World: Transnational masculinity in the fifties. University of Texas Press. ISBN 9780292747470.
- Nollen, Scott Allen (2013). Three Bad Men: John Ford, John Wayne, Ward Bond. McFarland. p. 211. ISBN 9780786458547.
- Schoenberger, Nancy (2017). Wayne and Ford: The Films, Friendship, and the Forging of an American Hero. Doubleday. ISBN 9780385534857.
- Slotkin, Richard (1992). Gunfighter nation: the myth of the frontier in twentieth-century America. New York : Toronto : New York: Atheneum; Maxwell Macmillan Canada ; Maxwell Macmillan International. ISBN 0689121636.
- Studlar, Gaylyn; Bernstein, Matthew (2001). John Ford made westerns: filming the legend in the sound era. Bloomington: Indiana University Press. ISBN 0253337984.
- Wetta, Frank J.; Novelli, Martin A. (June 2006). "'Romantic, isn't it, Miss Dandridge?': Sources and Meanings of John Ford's Cavalry Trilogy". American Nineteenth Century History. 7 (2): 299–321. doi:10.1080/14664650600810188.
- Wills, Garry (1997). John Wayne's America: the politics of celebrity. New York: Simon & Schuster. ISBN 0684808234.
