= The Lemon Drop Kid =

1951 film by Sidney Lanfield, Frank Tashlin

- Theatrical release poster
- Directed by: Sidney Lanfield; Frank Tashlin (uncredited)
- Screenplay by: Frank Tashlin; Edmund Hartmann; Robert O'Brien; Irving Elinson (additional dialogue)
- Story by: Edmund Beloin; Damon Runyon
- Based on: The Lemon Drop Kid by Damon Runyon
- Produced by: Robert L. Welch
- Starring: Bob Hope; Marilyn Maxwell; Lloyd Nolan
- Cinematography: Daniel L. Fapp
- Edited by: Archie Marshek
- Music by: Victor Young
- Production company: Hope Enterprises
- Distributed by: Paramount Pictures
- Release date: March 21, 1951 (New York)
- Running time: 91 minutes
- Country: United States
- Language: English
- Box office: $2.3 million (U.S. rentals)

The Lemon Drop Kid is a 1951 American comedy film starring Bob Hope and Marilyn Maxwell that is based on the short story of the same name written by Damon Runyon. Although Sidney Lanfield is credited as the director, Frank Tashlin is believed to have finished the film. The story had previously been adapted as a 1934 film of the same title.

The song "Silver Bells," sung by Hope and Maxwell, was introduced in the film.

== Plot ==
Sidney Milburn, known as the "Lemon Drop Kid," is a New York City swindler. He illegally touts horses at a Florida racetrack by recommending each horse in a race to different people, claiming a percentage of their winnings each time.

The Kid encounters a beautiful woman intending to bet $2,000 on a horse. He convinces her to switch her bet but learns that she was betting for her boyfriend, notorious gangster "Moose" Moran. When the horse finishes last, Moran demands that the Kid pay him $10,000 (the amount that he would have won) by Christmas Eve.

The Kid returns to New York to raise the money. He first tries his girlfriend Brainey Baxter before visiting crime boss Oxford Charlie, with whom he has previously dealt. However, Charlie is in serious tax trouble and cannot help him. As he leaves Charlie's establishment, the Kid notices a street corner Santa Claus and his kettle. Thinking quickly, the Kid dons a Santa suit and collects donations. He is recognized by a passing policeman and is convicted of panhandling, sentenced to ten days in jail. After Brainey posts his bail, he tries to legitimize his scam by finding a charity to represent and acquiring a license. He remembers that Nellie Thursday, a kindly neighborhood resident, has been denied entry to a retirement home because of her jailed husband's criminal past.

Organizing other small-time New York swindlers and Brainey, the Kid converts an abandoned casino into the Nellie Thursday Home for Old Dolls, populated by a group of elderly women. After he receives his license, the Kid and his collaborators dress as Santa Claus and position themselves throughout Manhattan. The others are unaware that the Kid plans to keep the money for himself to pay Moran. The scheme is a huge success, netting $2,000 in only a few days. Brainey is overjoyed and informs her employer, Oxford Charlie, that she is quitting her job as a dancer.

Seeing a potential fortune, Charlie tries to involve himself in the operation. He and his crew kidnap the home's inhabitants, including Nellie and Brainey, and move them to his mansion in Nyack. The Kid finds the home deserted and the money that he had hidden in a statue missing. He recognizes Charlie's footprints in the snow and visits him. When Charlie reveals the Kid's scheme through a phone conversation with Moose Moran, the Kid's accomplices become angry, but he manages to escape. However, Brainey finds him and voices her disgust.

After a few days of stewing in self-pity and realizing that it is Christmas Eve, the Kid is surprised to meet Nellie, who has escaped. He tries to recover the money, sneaking into Charlie's home disguised as an elderly woman. He finds that Charlie and his crew are moving the women to a more secure location. The Kid confronts Charlie in his office and fights with him. The Kid absconds with the money, narrowly avoiding Charlie's thugs. The chaos allows Brainey and the others to escape.

The Kid returns to the original Nellie Thursday home to meet with Moran. The deal appears to be in jeopardy as Moran arrives with Charlie, who demands that the Kid reimburse him, which would leave too little for Moran. However, the Kid hits a switch, revealing hidden casino tables that are occupied mainly by the escaped women. The Kid and his friends repel the gangsters as the police initiate a raid, resulting in the arrest of Moran and Charlie. The Kid assures the judge who sentenced him earlier that he will focus his attention on the home, which he will make a reality. Nellie's husband Henry, free on parole, is joyously reunited with his wife.

== Cast ==
- Bob Hope as Sidney Milburn, the Lemon Drop Kid
- Marilyn Maxwell as Brainey Baxter
- Lloyd Nolan as Oxford Charlie
- Jane Darwell as Nellie Thursday
- Andrea King as Stella
- Fred Clark as Moose Moran
- Jay C. Flippen as Straight Flush Tony
- William Frawley as Gloomy Willie
- Harry Bellaver as Sam the Surgeon
- Sid Melton as Little Louie
- Ben Welden as Singing Solly
- Ida Moore as the Bird Lady
- Francis Pierlot as Henry
- Charles Cooley as Goomba
- Harry Shannon as the policeman
- Tor Johnson as The Super Swedish Angel
- Tom Dugan as No Thumbs Charlie
- Emory Parnell as Man bumped into on street
- Mary Moder As Holly Seller

== Reception ==
In a contemporary review for The New York Times, critic Bosley Crowther wrote: "Damon Runyon's old story ... has been given a pretty thorough shakedown under the capable hands of Bob Hope in the slapstick farce ... The consequent entertainment, populated throughout by Mr. Hope, may be a far cry from Mr. Runyon's story, but it's a close howl to good, fast, gag-packed fun. Indeed, it has come to be expected that anything played by Mr. Hope is not safe from utter mutilation by him and the boys who write his stuff. That which is known as 'Runyon flavor' in the characters of his famous guys and dolls is as vulnerable to Mr. Hope's burlesquing as is a gentle tweak on the nose. So let it be understood that the current 'Lemon Drop Kid,' which previously was filmed some seventeen years back, is strictly a rough-house with Hope."

== Home media ==
On October 19, 2010, the film was released on DVD through Shout! Factory under license from the film's current distributor, FremantleMedia North America.

== See also ==
- List of Christmas films
- List of films about horses
- List of films about horse racing
