= Marilyn Maxwell =

American actress, singer (1921–1972)

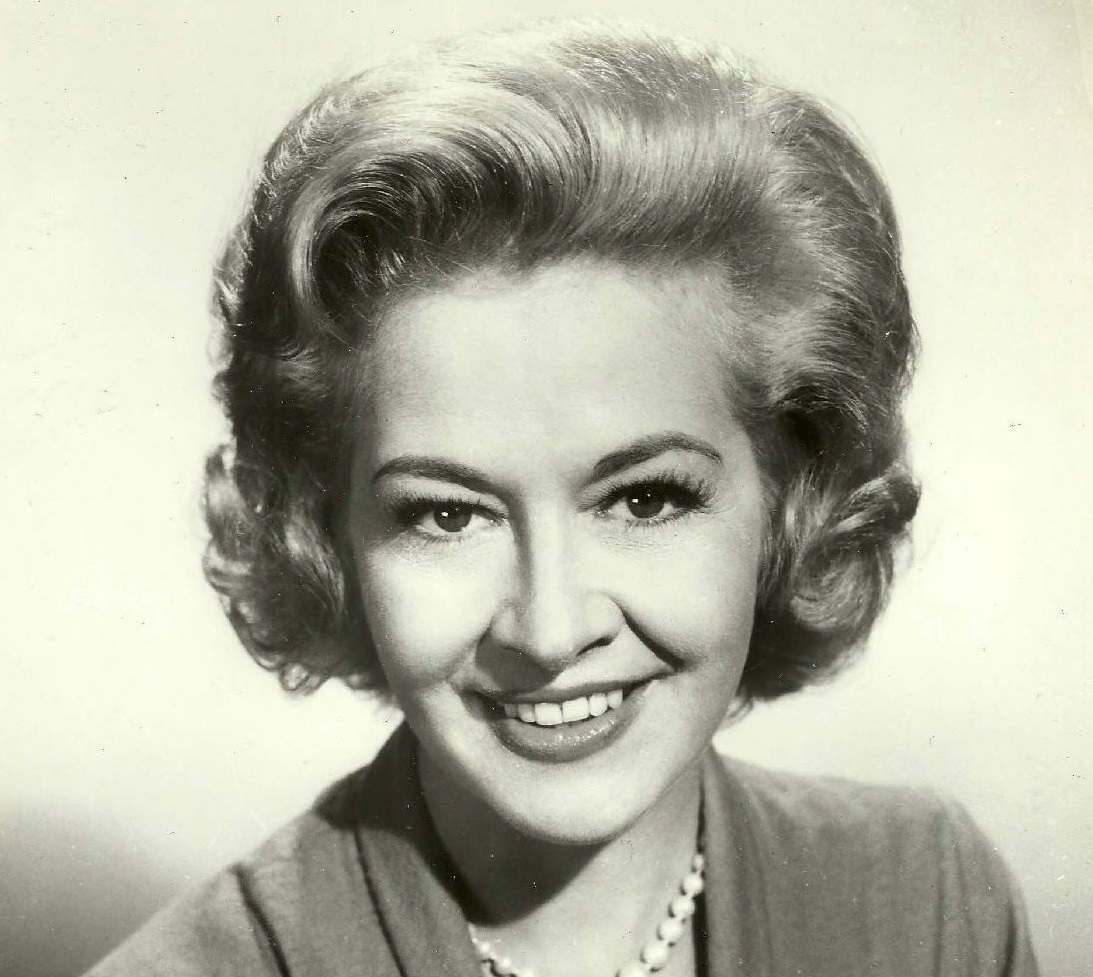
- Maxwell in 1961
- Born: Marvel Marilyn Maxwell; August 3, 1921; Clarinda, Iowa, U.S.
- Died: March 20, 1972 (aged 50); Beverly Hills, California, U.S.
- Occupations: Actress, singer
- Years active: 1942–71
- Spouses: John Conte (m. 1944; div. 1946) Anders McIntyre (m. 1950; div. 1951) Jerry Davis (m. 1954; div. 1960)
- Children: 1

Marvel Marilyn Maxwell (August 3, 1921 – March 20, 1972) was an American actress and singer.

In a career that spanned the 1940s and 1950s, she appeared in several films and radio programs, and entertained the troops during World War II and the Korean War on USO tours with Bob Hope.

== Early years ==
Maxwell was a native of Clarinda, Iowa. During the 1930s, she worked as an usher in Fort Wayne, Indiana, at the Rialto Theater, located at 2616 South Calhoun Street.

In Fort Wayne, she attended Central High School. She dropped out of school in her sophomore year to join an Indianapolis band as a singer.

== Career ==
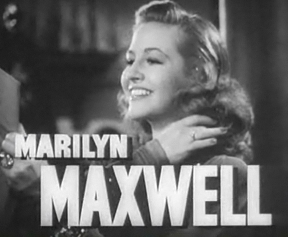
From the trailer for Stand by for Action (1942)

She started her professional entertaining career as a radio singer and a singer on stage with Ted Weems' big band while still a teenager.

She moved to Hollywood after being with the Pasadena Playhouse and signed with Metro-Goldwyn-Mayer in 1942 as a contract player. Louis B. Mayer, the head of MGM, insisted she change the Marvel part of her real name. She dropped her first name and kept the middle one.

Among the radio programs in which she appeared were Beat the Band, Kraft Music Hall and The Abbott and Costello Show.

She appeared in several Dr. Kildare films with Van Johnson – Dr. Gillespie's Criminal Case (1943); Three Men in White (1944); and Between Two Women (1945). Some of her other film roles included Lost in a Harem (1944) with Abbott and Costello; Champion (1949) with Kirk Douglas; The Lemon Drop Kid (1951) with Bob Hope; New York Confidential (1955) with Broderick Crawford; and Rock-A-Bye Baby (1958) with Jerry Lewis. She received critical praise for her performance in the musical Summer Holiday (1948). The Christmas song "Silver Bells" made its debut in The Lemon Drop Kid, sung by Maxwell and Hope.

In 1956 and 1957 Maxwell was a guest singer on the The Jimmy Durante Show. She sang at the Latin Quarter nightclub in New York City and other top nightclubs of the time.

She appeared as the mystery guest of What's My Line? on May 10, 1953. At one point, a blind-folded panelist asked whether or not she was actress Marilyn Monroe.

In 1961, she starred in the television series Bus Stop, but withdrew midway through the season.

== Personal life ==
Maxwell married three times; each ended in divorce. In September 1944, she married actor John Conte; the relationship was dissolved in June 1946. Her second marriage to restaurateur Anders McIntyre lasted just over a year from January 1, 1950 until March 23, 1951. Maxwell's six-year marriage to writer and producer Jerry Davis ended in 1960. Her only child, Matthew, was born to Maxwell and Davis in 1956.

Maxwell met and became friends with actor and singer Frank Sinatra when they crossed paths, both of them in separate nationally renowned big bands in the late 1930s. Their friendship continued after Maxwell gave up singing for acting and moved to Hollywood and Sinatra had moved from New Jersey to Beverly Hills in the early 1940s. By 1945, the friendship had progressed into an extra-marital affair. Sinatra's wife, Nancy, saw Maxwell wearing a diamond bracelet she had earlier seen in Sinatra's car which she assumed was for her. Taking this as evidence of Sinatra's infidelity, Nancy ordered Maxwell and her husband Conte to immediately leave the Sinatra family Christmas gala of 1945. Confronted after the party, Sinatra admitted the affair to his wife, but claimed it was only casual. Soon after, Maxwell and Sinatra ended their sexual liaison.

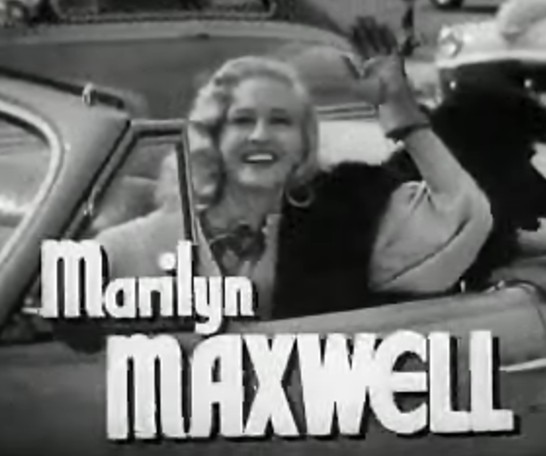
Trailer for High Barbaree (1947)

From 1950 to 1954, Maxwell had an affair with actor and comedian Bob Hope who was married to singer Dolores (Reade) Hope. Hope and Maxwell's relationship was so open that many in Hollywood referred to her as Mrs. Bob Hope.

During the 1950s, Maxwell became good friends with actor Rock Hudson. After her marriage to Davis ended in 1960, Hudson's agent Henry Willson arranged for Maxwell to become one of several women Hudson publicly "dated" to counter rumors of the actor's homosexuality.

=== Death ===
On March 20, 1972, at age fifty, Maxwell was found dead in her home by her fifteen-year-old son, who had arrived home from school. The cause was an apparent heart attack; she had been treated for hypertension and pulmonary disease. Bob Hope, Bing Crosby, Frank Sinatra, and Jack Benny were honorary pallbearers at her funeral.

== Radio appearances ==
Year	Program	Episode/source
1944	Kraft Music Hall	Resident singer
1946	Stars over Hollywood	A Woman's Touch
1947	The Abbott and Costello Show	Who's On 1st, 17 April 1947
1948	The Jack Benny Show	From Cleveland, 20 June 1948
1949	The Martin and Lewis Show	episode 10

== Filmography ==
=== Features ===
- Stand by for Action (1942) – Audrey Carr
- Dr. Gillespie's Criminal Case (1943) – Ruth Edly
- Salute to the Marines (1943) – Helen Bailey
- Thousands Cheer (1943) – Drug Store Clerk in Red Skelton Skit
- Swing Fever (1943) – Ginger Gray
- Three Men in White (1944) – Ruth Edley
- Lost in a Harem (1944) – Hazel Moon
- Between Two Women (1945) – Ruth Edley
- The Show-Off (1946) – Amy Fisher Piper
- High Barbaree (1947) – Diana Case
- Summer Holiday (1948) – Belle
- Race Street (1948) – Robbie Lawrence
- Champion (1949) – Grace
- Key to the City (1950) – Sheila
- Outside the Wall (1950) – Charlotte Maynard
- The Lemon Drop Kid (1951) – 'Brainey' Baxter
- New Mexico (1951) – Cherry
- Off Limits (1952) – Connie Curtis
- East of Sumatra (1953) – Lory Hale
- Paris Model (1953) – Marion Parmalee
- New York Confidential (1955) – Iris Palmer
- Rock-A-Bye Baby (1958) – Carla Naples
- Critic's Choice (1963) – Ivy London
- Stage to Thunder Rock (1964) – Leah Parker
- The Lively Set (1964) – Marge Owens
- Arizona Bushwhackers (1968) – Molly
- From Nashville with Music (1969) – Mabel
- The Phynx (1970) – Herself

=== Short subjects ===
- Screen Snapshots: Hollywood Goes to Bat (1950) – Herself
- Brooklyn Goes to Las Vegas (1956) – Herself
