= Vanessa Getty =

American socialite and philanthropist (born 1972)

- Born: Vanessa Louise Jarman; 1972 (age 53–54); San Francisco, California, U.S.
- Education: University of California, Los Angeles (BA)
- Occupations: Philanthropist; socialite; model
- Years active: 1999–present
- Spouse: Billy Getty (m. 1999)
- Children: 3
- Parents: Claude Jarman Jr. (father); Maryann Eve Opperman (mother)
- Relatives: Getty family (by marriage)

Vanessa Getty (née Jarman; born 1972) is an American socialite, philanthropist, and model based in San Francisco. She is the founder of the San Francisco Bay Humane Friends and the co-founder of GettyLab.

== Early life and education ==
Getty was born Vanessa Louise Jarman in 1972 in San Francisco to actor Claude Jarman Jr. (1934–2025) and ballerina Maryann Eve Opperman (née de Lichtenberg; 1942–2021). Her father received a Juvenile Academy Award for his role in The Yearling (1946) and later served as executive director of the San Francisco International Film Festival, while her mother danced with the San Francisco Ballet, the Royal Ballet, the National Ballet of Canada, and the Joffrey Ballet. She has one sister, Natalie, and five paternal half-siblings.

Getty was raised in San Francisco and attended Lick-Wilmerding High School and University High School before enrolling at the University of California, Los Angeles (UCLA), where she received a Bachelor of Arts in history. While at UCLA she volunteered with Animal Rescue Volunteers, a Simi Valley-based nonprofit.

== Philanthropy ==
=== Animal welfare ===
In 2005, Getty founded San Francisco Bay Humane Friends, a nonprofit that funds and operates a mobile spay-and-neuter and vaccination clinic for low-income communities in the San Francisco Bay Area. That same year she joined the board of directors of the Peninsula Humane Society & SPCA, which has housed and supported the mobile clinic's operations. Her fundraising for the charity has included the Purr fashion events, which have drawn participation from designers and figures including Michael Kors, Ralph Lauren, Louis Vuitton, Mulberry, Ellen DeGeneres, and Nicole Kidman. She has also served on the board of the Orangutan Foundation International.

=== Arts and cultural organizations ===
Getty served as a trustee of the Fine Arts Museums of San Francisco for nine years, helping govern the de Young Museum and the Legion of Honor. She co-chaired the Junior Committee's Mid-Winter Gala in Lanvin in 2008 and was named an honorary co-chair, alongside Trevor Traina, of the 2014 Mid-Winter Gala, which raised approximately $400,000 for the museums. She has additionally raised funds for the San Francisco Symphony.

She supported and donated to the campaign of U.S. Vice President Kamala Harris, who is also the godmother to one of her children.

=== AIDS research and other causes ===
Getty has been a longtime supporter of amfAR, The Foundation for AIDS Research, co-chairing fundraising events alongside figures such as Liza Minnelli and receiving the organization's Award of Courage. In November 2019, she and her husband attended amfAR's second Charity Poker Tournament, hosted at the San Francisco residence of Gordon and Ann Getty.

=== Political fundraising ===
Getty has been a fundraiser and donor for Democratic candidates, including Barack Obama, Joe Biden, John Kerry, Kirsten Gillibrand, and Kamala Harris. She and her husband were early Bay Area supporters of Harris's political career, beginning with her 2003 run for San Francisco District Attorney.

== Personal life ==
Getty met William Paul "Billy" Getty, a son of Gordon Getty and Ann Getty, when both were children in San Francisco. They married in 1999 at an estate in Napa Valley in a ceremony officiated by Judge William Newsom, the father of best man and future California governor Gavin Newsom. She wore a custom Narciso Rodriguez gown, the designer's first bridal commission since the 1996 wedding dress for Carolyn Bessette-Kennedy. The couple have three children. She and her husband co-founded the family philanthropic vehicle GettyLab.

In June 2025, Mary Riley, a 66-year-old San Francisco resident, filed a civil suit in San Francisco Superior Court alleging that Getty had crashed her Porsche Taycan into Riley's parked vehicle on March 28, 2024, near the intersection of Divisadero and Lombard streets, causing orthopedic injuries and a traumatic brain injury.
