= Batjac Productions =

American film production company

- Industry: Entertainment
- Founded: 1952; 74 years ago (as Wayne/Fellows Productions); 1956; 70 years ago (as Batjac Productions)
- Founder: John Wayne; Robert Fellows
- Key people: John Wayne (Founder)
- Products: Motion pictures, television programs

Batjac Productions is an independent film production company co-founded by John Wayne as a vehicle for Wayne to both produce and star in movies. It was originally known as Wayne-Fellows Productions when it started in 1952. The company's first production was Big Jim McLain released by Warner Bros. in 1952, and its final film was McQ, in 1974, also distributed by Warner Bros. After John Wayne's death in 1979, his son Michael Wayne owned and managed the company until his own death in 2003, when his wife Gretchen assumed ownership.

== About the company ==
Wayne and producer Robert Fellows founded Batjac in 1952 as Wayne/Fellows Productions. When Fellows left the company several years later, Wayne renamed the corporation after a fictitious trading company mentioned in the film Wake of the Red Witch (1948). The company name in Wake of the Red Witch was spelled Batjak, but Wayne's secretary misspelled it as Batjac on the corporation papers, and Wayne let it stand. Having his own company was intended to give Wayne artistic control over the films he made.

The best known of all Batjac's films is Wayne's version of The Alamo (1960), a project he had planned for several years. It was an account of the battle of the Alamo during the Texas Revolution of 1836. A labor of love for Wayne, The Alamo cost Wayne much of his personal fortune. Among Batjac's other productions are Hondo, Cahill U.S. Marshal, Big Jake, McLintock!, The Green Berets, Seven Men from Now, and McQ.

== The "lost" Wayne films ==
Because of a production/distribution deal with Warner Bros. and United Artists, Batjac was allowed to retain all rights to four Wayne films — The High and the Mighty, Hondo, Island in the Sky, distributed by Warner Bros.; and McLintock!, distributed by United Artists. It also held full copyright ownership in several non-Wayne movies, Seven Men from Now, Man in the Vault, Ring of Fear, Plunder of the Sun, Track of the Cat, China Doll, Escort West, and Gun the Man Down.

After Wayne's death in 1979, his son Michael Wayne gained full ownership and managed the company until he died in 2003. He meticulously managed the release pattern of his father's films and restored Hondo and McLintock! in the early 1990s for release on VHS and television. His passion was to restore the other two films, but water damage to the original elements made it impossible during his lifetime. Taking advantage of the new digital restoration processes, Michael's widow Gretchen restored these films in 2004 and released them through a distribution deal with Paramount Pictures in 2005.

== List of Batjac productions ==
Year	Title	Distributor	Producer	Director	Star(s)	Academy Awards		Notes
Year	Title	Distributor	Producer	Director	Star(s)	Wins	Nominations	Notes
1952	Big Jim McLain	Warner Bros.	Robert Fellows	Edward Ludwig	John Wayne and Nancy Olson			Produced as Wayne/Fellows Productions
1953	Plunder of the Sun	Warner Bros.	Robert Fellows	John Farrow	Glenn Ford and Diana Lynn			Produced as Wayne/Fellows Productions
1953	Island in the Sky	Warner Bros.	Robert Fellows	William A. Wellman	John Wayne			Produced as Wayne/Fellows Productions
1953	Hondo	Warner Bros.	Robert Fellows and John Wayne	John Farrow	John Wayne and Geraldine Page		Best Supporting Actress (Geraldine Page); Best Story (Louis L'Amour) (later withdrawn)	Produced as Wayne/Fellows Productions; filmed in three dimensions (3D)
1954	The High and the Mighty	Warner Bros.	Robert Fellows	William A. Wellman	John Wayne and Claire Trevor	Best Original Score (Dimitri Tiomkin)	Best Supporting Actress (Jan Sterling); Best Supporting Actress (Claire Trevor); Best Director (William A. Wellman); Best Film Editing; Best Original Song (Dimitri Tiomkin and Ned Washington)	Produced as Wayne/Fellows Productions; filmed in CinemaScope; won Golden Globe for Best Supporting Actress (Jan Sterling); nominated for DGA Award for Outstanding Directing in Motion Pictures (William A. Wellman)
1954	Ring of Fear	Warner Bros.	Robert Fellows	William A. Wellman	James Edward Grant and William A. Wellman (uncredited)	Pat O'Brien		Produced as Wayne/Fellows Productions; filmed in CinemaScope
1954	Track of the Cat	Warner Bros.	Robert Fellows and John Wayne	William A. Wellman	Robert Mitchum and Teresa Wright			Produced as Wayne/Fellows Productions; filmed in CinemaScope
1955	Blood Alley	Warner Bros.	John Wayne	William A. Wellman	John Wayne and Lauren Bacall			Filmed in CinemaScope
1956	Good-bye, My Lady	Warner Bros.	John Wayne	William A. Wellman	Walter Brennan and Brandon deWilde			
1956	Seven Men from Now	Warner Bros.	Andrew V. McLaglen and Robert E. Morrison	Budd Boetticher	Randolph Scott and Gail Russell			
1956	Gun the Man Down	United Artists	Robert E. Morrison and John Wayne	Andrew V. McLaglen	James Arness and Angie Dickinson			
1956	Man in the Vault	RKO	Robert E. Morrison	Andrew V. McLaglen	William Campbell, Karen Sharpe, and Anita Ekberg			
1957	Legend of the Lost	United Artists	Henry Hathaway	Henry Hathaway	John Wayne and Sophia Loren			Filmed in Technirama
1958	China Doll	United Artists	Frank Borzage and Robert E. Morrison	Frank Borzage	Victor Mature			Batjac co-produced with Victor Mature's Romina Productions
1958	Escort West	United Artists	Nate H. Edwards and Robert E. Morrison	Francis D. Lyon	Victor Mature			Batjac co-produced with Victor Mature's Romina Productions
1960	The Alamo	United Artists	John Wayne	John Wayne	John Wayne, Richard Widmark, and Laurence Harvey	Best Sound	Best Picture; Best Supporting Actor (Chill Wills); Best Color Cinematography (William H. Clothier); Best Film Editing; Best Original Song (Dimitri Tiomkin and Paul Francis Webster); Best Original Score (Dimitri Tiomkin)	Filmed in Todd-AO; won Golden Globe for Best Original Score (Dimitri Tiomkin)
1963	McLintock!	United Artists	Michael Wayne	Andrew V. McLaglen	John Wayne and Maureen O'Hara			
1966	Cast a Giant Shadow	United Artists	Melville Shavelson and Michael Wayne	Melville Shavelson	Kirk Douglas and Senta Berger			Batjac co-produced with Melville Shavelson's production company, Llenroc ('Cornell' spelt backwards), and the Mirisch Company
1967	The War Wagon	Universal Pictures	Marvin Schwartz	Burt Kennedy	John Wayne and Kirk Douglas			
1967	Hondo and the Apaches (TV movie)	MGM Television	Andrew J. Fenady	Lee H. Katzin	Ralph Taeger			Two episodes from the TV series of the same name, edited together and released as a feature.
1967	Hondo (TV series)	ABC	Andrew J. Fenady	Lee H. Katzin (and others)	Ralph Taeger			17 episodes
1968	The Green Berets	Warner Bros.	Michael Wayne	John Wayne, Ray Kellogg, and Mervyn LeRoy (uncredited)	John Wayne			
1970	Chisum	Warner Bros.	Michael Wayne	Andrew V. McLaglen	John Wayne			
1970	Swing Out, Sweet Land (TV Special)	NBC	William O. Harbach (and others)	Stan Harris	John Wayne			Won Outstanding Achievement in Music Direction of a Variety, Musical or Dramatic Program (Dominic Frontiere) at the 23rd Primetime Emmy Awards
1970	Rio Lobo	National General	Howard Hawks	Howard Hawks	John Wayne			
1971	Big Jake	National General	Michael Wayne	George Sherman	John Wayne and Richard Boone			
1973	The Train Robbers	Warner Bros.	Michael Wayne	Burt Kennedy	John Wayne and Ann-Margret			
1973	Cahill U.S. Marshal	Warner Bros.	Michael Wayne	Andrew V. McLaglen	John Wayne			
1974	McQ	Warner Bros.	Michael Wayne	John Sturges	John Wayne			Co-produced with Levy-Gardner-Laven

== List of John Wayne productions at Republic Pictures ==
John Wayne served as producer for Republic Pictures on these films, prior to the founding of Wayne-Fellows/Batjac Productions in 1952;

Year	Title	Distributor	Producer	Director	Star(s)	Academy Awards		Notes
Year	Title	Distributor	Producer	Director	Star(s)	Wins	Nominations	Notes
1947	Angel and the Badman	Republic	John Wayne]	James Edward Grant	John Wayne and Gail Russell			
1949	The Fighting Kentuckian	Republic	John Wayne	George Waggner	John Wayne and Vera Ralston			
1950	The Dangerous Stranger	Short film	Sid Davis and John Wayne (uncredited)	Sid Davis				
1951	Santa and the Fairy Snow Queen	Short film	John Wayne (uncredited)	Sid Davis	Rochelle Stanton, Edmund Penney, and Margo Von Leu			
1951	Bullfighter and the Lady	Republic	John Wayne	Budd Boetticher	Robert Stack and Joy Page		Best Story (Budd Boetticher and Ray Nazarro)	
