= McLintock! =

1963 film by Andrew V. McLaglen

- Theatrical film poster
- Directed by: Andrew V. McLaglen
- Written by: James Edward Grant
- Produced by: Michael Wayne
- Starring: John Wayne; Maureen O'Hara; Patrick Wayne; Stefanie Powers; Jack Kruschen; Chill Wills; Yvonne De Carlo
- Cinematography: William H. Clothier
- Edited by: Otho Lovering; Bill Lewis
- Music by: De Vol
- Production company: Batjac Productions
- Distributed by: United Artists
- Release date: November 13, 1963
- Running time: 127 minutes
- Language: English
- Budget: $4 million
- Box office: $14.5 million

See also McClintock (disambiguation)

McLintock! is a 1963 American Western comedy film, starring John Wayne and Maureen O'Hara, directed by Andrew V. McLaglen. The film co-stars Wayne's son Patrick Wayne, Stefanie Powers, Jack Kruschen, Chill Wills, and Yvonne De Carlo (billed as special guest star). Loosely based on William Shakespeare's The Taming of the Shrew, the project was filmed in Technicolor and Panavision, and produced by Wayne's company, Batjac Productions.

In 1991, the film entered the public domain in the United States because the claimants did not renew its copyright registration in the 28th year after publication.

== Plot ==
The full film

In 1895, Cattle baron and town namesake George Washington "G.W." McLintock lives on his Mesa Verde ranch. Two years earlier, his wife, Katherine, left with no explanation, moving back East to become a socialite. Their young adult daughter, Becky, is away at school. McLintock is disliked by town bureaucrat Matt Douglas, Indian agent Agard, and Governor Cuthbert H. Humphrey, but he is a friend to many, including Sheriff Jeff Lord, general store owner Jake Birnbaum, the local indigent, and Comanche Indians.

McLintock encounters new homesteaders and warns them that the Mesa Verde is only suitable for cattle ranching and too arid for farming. Earlier settlers failed due to scarce water sources. Devlin "Dev" Warren, a young settler who supports his widowed mother, Louise, and sister, Alice, asks McLintock for a job. McLintock does not want to hire a farmer, so aged drifter Bunny Dull urges Dev to try begging. Dev pleads for a job, then lashes out at being reduced to begging. McLintock admires his forthrightness and hires him and also Louise as a cook. Meanwhile, Katherine returns to seek a divorce. When McLintock refuses, she moves back onto the ranch and bosses everyone, including Louise.

The Comanche, led by Running Buffalo, arrive in town to meet the train carrying their newly released chiefs. Sheriff Lord settles them near the homesteaders despite Douglas' protests. When homesteaders mistakenly believed the Comanche have kidnapped a young woman, they attempt to lynch Running Buffalo in retaliation. McLintock and his men try to defuse the situation, but a brawl ensues, with Katherine joining McLintock's side.

Becky arrives home with would-be suitor, Matt Douglas, Jr. McLintock dislikes "Junior," so Katherine acts approvingly merely to spite him. Also aboard Becky's train are four Comanche chiefs, one who is McLintock's former enemy-turned-blood-brother, Chief Puma. They have arrived for a hearing to determine if their people will be relocated to a reservation in Fort Sill, Oklahoma. McLintock agrees to speak at the hearing on their behalf.

Dev and Becky get into an argument when Dev insultingly calls Junior a dude". When Dev gets into a fistfight to protect Birnbaum's assistant, Davey Elk, everyone is impresses by his boxing skills. Later, after Becky and Junior deliberately taunt him, Dev calls Becky a trollop for kissing Junior before being properly engaged. Becky demands McLintock shoot Dev for insulting her; McLintock relents and mock shoots him using a harmless starter's pistol to teach Becky a lesson. Dev, believing he was going to be killed, spanks Becky with a coal shovel, angering Katherine.

At the relocation hearing, McLintock delivers a plea from Puma to Governor Humphrey but is ignored. As a result, the Comanche are ordered jailed until being sent to Fort Sill. Getting drunk, McLintock tells Bunny that if the Comanche were to go out fighting as they wanted, the government might realize how Humphrey has mismanaged the territory and intervene.

McLintock returns home and pressures Louise into drinking with him, though she is attempting to give her notice as cook. She relents and joins him. While later drunkenly heading upstairs, both tumble down the stairs. Katherine, hearing the commotion, assumes the worst upon seeing Louise on McLintock's lap at the staircase bottom. Louise then explains that she is quitting because Sheriff Lord has proposed.

At the Fourth of July celebration, Katherine rebuffs Governor Humphrey's advances, but continues treating McLintock harshly. Bunny, who took McLintock's earlier suggestion seriously, helps free the Comanches and provides them rifles stolen from a military boxcar. The Comanches charge through town, free their chiefs, and escape, with the cavalry in hot pursuit. While hiding in a haystack during the raid, Dev and Becky reconcile and become engaged. Following Birnbaum's advice, McLintock confronts Katherine, who admits that she (mistakenly) believed he was having an affair. After pursuing her through town and publicly spanking her, McLintock says Katherine can divorce him, then heads home. Katherine follows and they reconcile.

== Cast ==
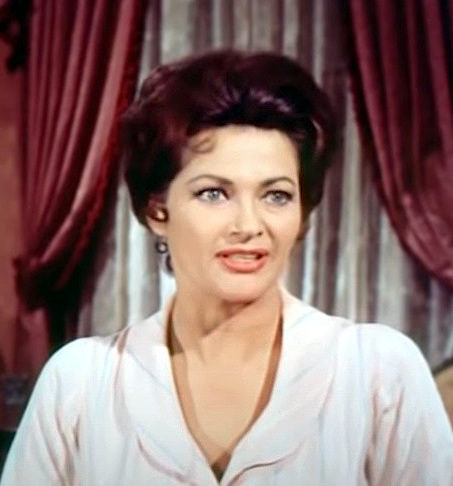
Yvonne De Carlo as Louise Warren

- John Wayne as George Washington "G.W." McLintock
- Maureen O'Hara as Katherine "Kate" McLintock
- Patrick Wayne as Devlin "Dev" Warren
- Stefanie Powers as Rebecca "Becky" McLintock
- Jack Kruschen as Jake Birnbaum
- Chill Wills as Drago
- Yvonne De Carlo as Louise Warren
- Jerry Van Dyke as Matt Douglas Jr.
- Edgar Buchanan as Bunny Dull
- Perry Lopez as Davey Elk
- Strother Martin as Agard
- Gordon Jones as Matt Douglas
- Robert Lowery as Governor Cuthbert H. Humphrey
- Hank Worden as "Curly" Fletcher
- Michael Pate as Chief Puma
- Bruce Cabot as Ben Sage Sr.
- Edward Faulkner as Ben Sage Jr.
- Mari Blanchard as Camille
- Leo Gordon as Jones
- Chuck Roberson as Sheriff Jeff Lord
- Bob Steele as Train Engineer
- Aissa Wayne as Alice Warren
- "Big" John Hamilton as Fauntleroy Sage
- H.W. Gim as Ching
- John Stanley as Running Buffalo (uncredited)
- Kari Noven as Millie Jones (uncredited)

== Production ==
The script was developed by John Wayne as a way for him to express his disapproval for how Westerns negatively represent Native Americans, his opinions on marital abuse, and discontent for political corruption from either party, intentionally contrasting previous films in which Wayne starred but had little creative control, such as John Ford's The Searchers. Another sharp contrast from previous films of Wayne is the emphasis on comedy, and using the Western setting for slapstick possibilities. He offered the job of directing to Andrew McLaglen, son of Wayne's longtime co-star Victor McLaglen, who had directed a number of low-budget features and had worked widely in television. It was the first movie fully produced by Wayne's son, Michael, although he had worked on a number of other films in various capacities. The male juvenile lead Dev Warren was played Wayne's younger son, Patrick. Henry Hathaway said he was going to direct the film, but Wayne was not willing to pay his fee.

The film was shot at Old Tucson Studios, west of Tucson, Arizona, and at San Rafael Ranch House - San Rafael State Natural Area, south of Patagonia, Arizona, and Nogales. Although the name of the territory is never mentioned, and the Mesa Verde region where the film is set is located predominantly in Colorado, New Mexico, and Utah, in the court scene, the flag of Arizona is seen alongside the U.S. flag, although the flag of Arizona was not created until 1917.

Many of the cast and crew, including Andrew McLaglen, William H. Clothier, Bruce Cabot, Chill Wills, Edward Faulkner, Hank Worden, Strother Martin, Michael Pate, Leo Gordon, Chuck Roberson, John Stanley (the Navajo actor and veteran member of John Ford's stock company, who plays Running Buffalo), and Patrick and Aissa Wayne, as well as Maureen O'Hara, had worked with Wayne on other productions. Wayne insisted a supporting role be given to Yvonne De Carlo, whose husband Bob Morgan had been injured making How the West Was Won. Michael Wayne estimated the budget as being $3.5 to $4.0 million.

As in many other John Wayne films, Wayne is wearing his favorite "Red River D" belt buckle. It can be best seen in the scene where G.W. McLintock (Wayne) addresses the homesteaders about 10 minutes into the film, and at the end of the scene where the Comanche ride through town on the way to "the last fight of the Comanche", around 10 minutes from the end of the movie.

In the DVD Special Feature "Maureen O'Hara and Stefanie Powers Remember McLintock!," O'Hara reported that when Wayne and she filmed the famous scene in which he spanked her with a coal scuttle shovel, he did not pull his strokes. "He really spanked me! My bottom was black and blue for weeks!"

== Music ==
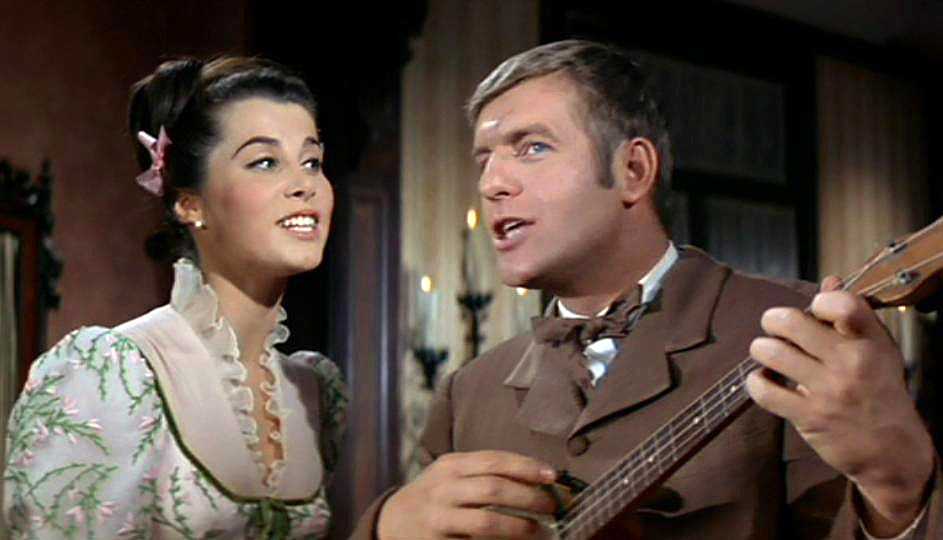
Stefanie Powers and Jerry Van Dyke

- "Love in the Country" sung by The Limeliters
- Music coordinator: "By" Dunham
- "Love in the Country" words and music by "By" Dunham and Frank DeVol
- "Just Right for Me", "Cakewalk", "When We Dance" words and music by "By" Dunham

== Reception ==
The film was a box-office success, and a timely one, since The Alamo had cost Wayne in both financial and "box-office capital" terms. McLintock! grossed $14,500,000 in North America, earning $7.25 million in US theatrical rentals.

Andrew McLaglen said the film "put me in the big time." He made four more films with Wayne: Hellfighters (1968), The Undefeated (1969), Chisum (1970), and Cahill, U.S. Marshal (1973).

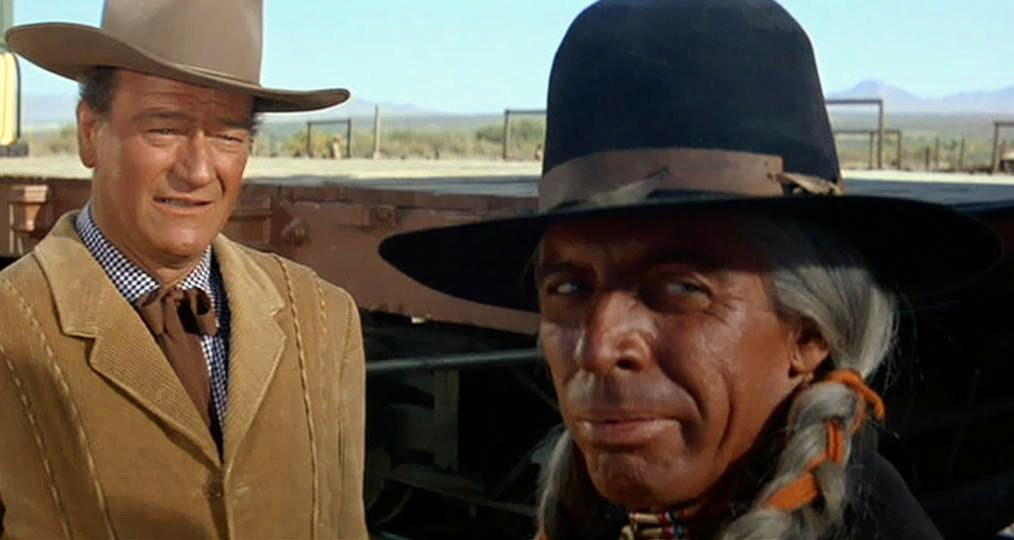
John Wayne and Michael Pate as G.W. McLintock and Comanche Chief Puma (Pate is in redface).

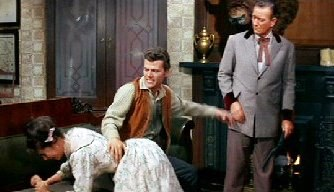
John Wayne watches as Patrick Wayne spanks Stefanie Powers.

According to Bosley Crowther, "the broadly comic Western ... sounded like a promising idea"; "the scenery is opulent and the action out-of-doors, the color lush, and the cast made up almost entirely of recruits from John Ford's long cinematic cycle commemorating the tradition of the American frontier." Since "the direction was entrusted to a relative newcomer, Victor McLaglen's television-trained son, Andrew V. McLaglen ... good intentions, when the task at hand is as difficult as lusty farce, are not enough." Emanuel Levy, in a review years after the film's release, said the film is "significant because it marks the beginning of Wayne's attempt to impose his general views, not just political ones, on his pictures. Most of Wayne's screen work after McLintock! would express his opinions about education, family, economics, and even friendship."

== Novelization ==
Richard Wormser wrote a novelization of the screenplay.

== Copyright status ==
The film was produced by John Wayne's Batjac Productions and released through United Artists. Batjac failed to renew the copyright, which expired in 1991. In 1994, a legal case determined the film was in the public domain in the United States, but the music score remained under copyright.

Batjac Productions, a company now owned by John Wayne's estate, retains distribution rights for "officially restored" versions of the film and holds the original film negatives, as well as rights to the film's musical score.

== Home media ==
Despite being available in the public domain by various distributors for the past decade (including GoodTimes Home Video and Simitar Entertainment), the first official home video issue of the film was released in the mid-1990s by MPI Home Video. In 2005, Paramount Home Entertainment struck a distribution deal with Batjac (which owns the original film negatives) and was granted exclusive distribution rights for an official remastered release debuting on DVD in 2005. This "official" DVD release uses a restoration made from the original camera negative, under license from Batjac, with a newly created 5.1 surround mix and the original monoaural. Bonus features include a new extensive documentary, a "2 Minute Fight School" featurette, photo and trailer galleries, and an audio commentary with Leonard Maltin, Frank Thompson, Maureen O'Hara, Stefanie Powers, Michael Pate, Michael Wayne, and Andrew McLaglen. In spite of this licensed release, numerous versions of the film are still being released by other companies, with most using old TV prints and film elements outside of Batjac's official restoration.

Olive Films released a bare-bones Blu-Ray in March 2013, using a 2012 2K scan of a 35-mm Technicolor element with the original monoaural track. Olive's release had no involvement from Batjac Productions, as the 2K restoration was provided by the Library of Congress and is classified as public domain, whereas the "official" restoration is copyrighted to Batjac with Paramount handling exclusive distribution.

Paramount followed up in May 2014 with their Blu-Ray release, under license from Batjac Productions. This release uses a brand new 4K remaster from the original camera negative with Dolby TrueHD 5.1 surround and original mono. It also carries over all the bonus features from the previous Paramount DVD, with the only new addition of the original theatrical trailer scanned in 2K from a 35-mm element.

== Comic-book adaption ==
- Gold Key: McLintock! (March 1964)

== See also ==
- List of American films of 1963
- John Wayne filmography
