= Chuck Roberson =

American actor and stuntman (1919–1988)

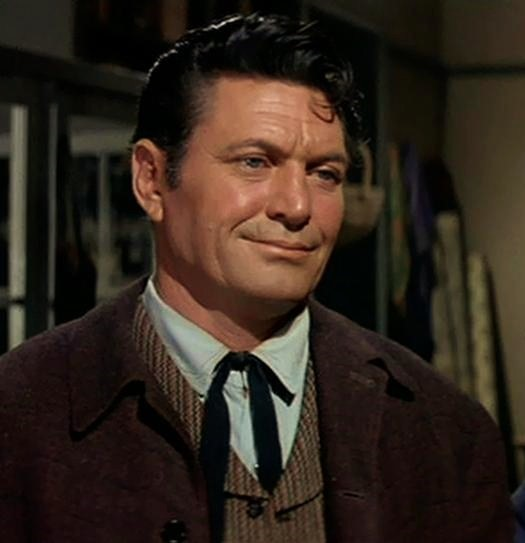
- Roberson in McLintock! (1963)
- Born: Charles Hugh Roberson; May 10, 1919
- Died: June 8, 1988 (aged 69); Bakersfield, California, U.S.
- Resting place: Forest Lawn Memorial Park, Hollywood Hills
- Other name: Bad Chuck
- Occupations: Actor; stuntman
- Years active: 1946–1988

Charles Hugh Roberson (May 10, 1919 – June 8, 1988) was an American actor and stuntman.

== Biography ==
Roberson grew up on a ranch near Roswell, New Mexico, and left school at 13 to become a cowhand and oilfield roughneck. He married and took his wife and daughter to California, where he joined the Culver City Police Department and guarded the gate at MGM studios. Following army service in World War II, he returned to the police force. During duty at Warner Bros. studios during a labor strike, he met stuntman Guy Teague, who alerted him to a stunt job at Republic Pictures. Teague had been John Wayne's stunt double for many years and was able to show him the ropes. Chuck also resembled John Carroll, whom Roberson doubled in his first picture, Wyoming (1947). He played small roles and performed stunts in other roles in the same film. He graduated to larger supporting roles in Westerns for Wayne and John Ford, and to a parallel career as a second-unit director.

His television appearances include The Lone Ranger, The Adventures of Kit Carson, Lawman, Death Valley Days, Have Gun – Will Travel, Laramie, Gunsmoke, The Virginian, Laredo, Bonanza, Daniel Boone, and The Big Valley. Roberson also appeared in Disney's television Westerns The Swamp Fox and Texas John Slaughter. They were part of The Wonderful World of Color. Prior to that, he portrayed a Confederate prison captain in The Great Locomotive Chase.

According to commentary for the 1963 film McLintock!, film critic Leonard Maltin and actress Maureen O'Hara stated that Roberson was known as "Bad Chuck" in contrast to "Good Chuck", referencing fellow stunt performer Chuck Hayward, due to Roberson's great successes with women.

In 1980, he published an autobiography, The Fall Guy: 30 Years as the Duke's Double (ISBN 088839036X).

Roberson died of cancer on June 8, 1988, in Bakersfield, California, and is buried in Forest Lawn Cemetery, Hollywood Hills, California, next to his brother, actor Lou Roberson.

Bob Dylan drew him as Long Tom in his Beaten Path series, the drawing is entitled Untitled 1 and is based on a frame from the film Winchester '73 (1950).

Roberson and Wayne Burson, another stuntman, were partners in breeding and training racehorses, with Roberson furnishing the horses from his Bakersfield, California, ranch and Burson training them.

== Filmography (actor) ==
- Plainsman and the Lady (1946) – Deputy (uncredited)
- Calendar Girl (1947) – Swedish Tug of War Man (uncredited)
- Song of Scheherazade (1947) – Midshipman (uncredited)
- Jesse James Rides Again (1947, Serial) – Lafe (uncredited)
- The Flame (1947) – Policeman (uncredited)
- Albuquerque (1948) – Man at Gambling Table (uncredited)
- California Firebrand (1948) – Gunman (uncredited)
- The Arizona Ranger (1948) – Henchman (uncredited)
- The Gallant Legion (1948) – Ranger (uncredited)
- Homicide for Three (1948) – Joe – Policeman (uncredited)
- Last of the Wild Horses (1948) – Deputy Chuck (uncredited)
- Wake of the Red Witch (1948) (with John Wayne) – Seaman (uncredited)
- Stampede (1949) – Sandy (uncredited)
- Roughshod (1949) – Deputy (uncredited)
- Law of the Golden West (1949) – Wagon Driver (uncredited)
- Hellfire (1949) – Groper (uncredited)
- Haunted Trails (1949) – Ranch Hand Ed (uncredited)
- The James Brothers of Missouri (1949) – Townsman (uncredited)
- The Fighting Kentuckian (1949) (with John Wayne) – Militiaman (uncredited)
- Western Renegades (1949) – Jones (uncredited)
- Trail of the Rustlers (1950) – Bob, Henchman (uncredited)
- The Capture (1950) – Employee (uncredited)
- Outcast of Black Mesa (1950) – Kramer, Henchman
- Cow Town (1950) – Mike Grady, Henchman
- Winchester '73 (1950) – Long Tom (uncredited)
- Hills of Oklahoma (1950) – Cowhand (uncredited)
- Hi-Jacked (1950) – Police Officer (uncredited)
- Atom Man vs. Superman (1950, Serial) – Policeman on Road [Chs. 11–12, 14] (uncredited)
- Rio Grande (1950) – Officer / Indian Who Fires Arrow into Colonel York's Chest (uncredited)
- Frontier Outpost (1950) – Gopher, Henchman (uncredited)
- Lightning Guns (1950) – Hank Burch, Henchman (uncredited)
- The Bandit Queen (1950) – Deputy (uncredited)
- Ridin' the Outlaw Trail (1951) – Henchman Reno (uncredited)
- Oh! Susanna (1951) – Barfly (uncredited)
- The Last Outpost (1951) – Confederate Corporal (uncredited)
- Cattle Drive (1951) – Chuck Saunders (uncredited)
- Fort Dodge Stampede (1951) – Henchman Ragan
- Indian Uprising (1952) – Taggart Man (uncredited)
- Buffalo Bill in Tomahawk Territory (1952) – Trooper (uncredited)
- Cattle Town (1952) – Rider (uncredited)
- The Lusty Men (1952) – Cowboy (uncredited)
- Way of a Gaucho (1952) – Gaucho (uncredited)
- Blackbeard the Pirate (1952) – Mounted Soldier (uncredited)
- Abbott and Costello Meet Captain Kidd (1952) – Pirate (uncredited)
- The Blazing Forest (1952) – Lumberjack (uncredited)
- Cow Country (1953) – Stubby
- Raiders of the Seven Seas (1953) – Spanish Officer (uncredited)
- Hannah Lee: An American Primitive (1953) – Cowboy (uncredited)
- Gun Belt (1953) – Oliver
- Calamity Jane (1953) – Barfly (uncredited)
- Hondo (1953) (with John Wayne) – Kloori / Cavalry Sergeant killed in Indian Attack (uncredited)
- Jubilee Trail (1954) – Man at Bar (uncredited)
- The Lone Gun (1954) – Luke (uncredited)
- The Far Country (1954) – Latigo (uncredited)
- Sign of the Pagan (1954) – Mirrai
- Ten Wanted Men (1955) – Campbell's Rider / Henchman (uncredited)
- Timberjack (1955) – Lumberjack (uncredited)
- The Prodigal (1955) – Chieftain (uncredited)
- The Tall Men (1955) – Alva Jenkin, Jayhawker Leader (uncredited)
- The Second Greatest Sex (1955) – Brawler (uncredited)
- The Great Locomotive Chase (1956) – Confederate Prison Captain (uncredited)
- Red Sundown (1956) – Henshaw's Man (uncredited)
- The Searchers (1956) (with John Wayne) – Ranger at Wedding (uncredited)
- The Rawhide Years (1956) – Johnny (uncredited)
- Seven Men from Now (1956) – Mason
- The King and Four Queens (1956) – Posseman (uncredited)
- The Wings of Eagles (1957) (with John Wayne) – Officer (uncredited)
- Night Passage (1957) – Roan
- Run of the Arrow (1957) – Sergeant
- The Hired Gun (1957) – Frank Cooper, Conroy Ranch Wrangler (uncredited)
- Forty Guns (1957) – Howard Swain
- The Big Country (1958) – Terrill Cowboy
- Man of the West (1958) – Rifleman-guard on Train (uncredited)
- Rio Bravo (1959) (with John Wayne) – Gunman (uncredited)
- The Wonderful Country (1959) – Barton
- Sergeant Rutledge (1960) – Court-martial Board Member (uncredited)
- Spartacus (1960) – Slave (uncredited)
- The Alamo (1960) (with John Wayne) – Tennessean
- Two Rode Together (1961) – Comanche (uncredited)
- The Man Who Shot Liberty Valance (1962) (with John Wayne) – Henchman (uncredited)
- Merrill's Marauders (1962) – Officer
- How the West Was Won (1962) – Officer (uncredited)
- Donovan's Reef (1963) (with John Wayne) – Festus (uncredited)
- Shock Corridor (1963) – Wilkes
- McLintock! (1963) (with John Wayne) – Sheriff Jeff Lord
- Mail Order Bride (1964) – Saloon Brawler (uncredited)
- Advance to the Rear (1964) – Monk (uncredited)
- Cheyenne Autumn (1964) – Jessie (uncredited)
- The Rounders (1965) – Brawler (uncredited)
- Black Spurs (1965) – Norton, Prisoner
- Shenandoah (1965) – Rebel Commander with Mustache Who Orders to Take the Union Cow (uncredited)
- The Sons of Katie Elder (1965) (with John Wayne) – Townsman (uncredited)
- Cat Ballou (1965) – Armed Guard (uncredited)
- Nevada Smith (1966) – Deputy (uncredited)
- Blindfold (1966) – Fitzpatrick's Henchman (uncredited)
- Smoky (1966) – Chuck – a Ranchhand
- Daniel Boone: Frontier Trail Rider (1966) – Dutch, Teamster
- The Adventures of Bullwhip Griffin (1967) – Cook (uncredited)
- Welcome to Hard Times (1967) – Miner Fighting Bert (uncredited)
- The War Wagon (1967) (with John Wayne) – Brown / Mustachioed Guard at blown bridge
- El Dorado (1967) (with John Wayne) – Jason's Gunman (uncredited)
- The Scalphunters (1968) – Scalphunter
- The Green Berets (1968) (with John Wayne) – Sergeant Griffin
- Hellfighters (1968) (with John Wayne) – Firefighter in Airplane (uncredited)
- The Undefeated (1969) (with John Wayne) – Yankee Sergeant at River (uncredited)
- Chisum (1970) (with John Wayne) – Trail Herder (uncredited)
- Rio Lobo (1970) (with John Wayne) – Corporal in Baggage Car (uncredited)
- Big Jake (1971) (with John Wayne) – Texas Ranger (uncredited)
- Cahill U.S. Marshal (1973) (with John Wayne) – Leader of the Bunch
- McQ (1974) (with John Wayne) – Bodyguard (uncredited)
- 99 and 44/100% Dead (1974) – Gunman

== Television ==
- The Lone Ranger (1949)
  - (Season 1 Episode 8: "The Renegades") – Henchman at Cave (uncredited)
  - (Season 1 Episode 11: "Six Guns Legacy") – Henchman Joe (Credit only)
  - (Season 1 Episode 12: "Return of the Convict") – Tod Gunder (uncredited)
- Cowboy G-Men (1952) (Season 1 Episode 12: "Koniackers") – Lefty
- The Adventures of Rin Tin Tin (1955) (Season 1 Episode 34: "The Lonesome Road") – Manley Stevens
- Panic! (1957) (Season 1 Episode 12: "The Vigilantes") – Sam Glenn
- Death Valley Days (1957-1960) (3 episodes)
  - (Season 5 Episode 11: "The Trial of Red Haskell") (1957) – Red Haskell
  - (Season 8 Episode 21: "The Strangers") (1960) – Oscar
  - (Season 9 Episode 2: "Splinter Station") (1960) – Sergeant Jim Laughlin
- Wide Wide World (1958) (Episode: "The Western") – Himself
- Cimarron City (1958-1959) (2 episodes)
  - (Season 1 Episode 9: "A Respectable Girl") (1958) – Cowhand
  - (Season 1 Episode 20: "Blind is the Killer") (1959) – Foreman
- Wagon Train (1958-1960) (2 episodes)
  - (Season 2 Episode 7: "The Bije Wilcox Story") (1958) – Captain Thorpe
  - (Season 4 Episode 9: "The Colter Craven Story") (1960) – Junior (uncredited)
- Walt Disney Presents (1958-1961) (6 episodes)
  - (Season 5 Episode 5: "Texas John Slaughter") (1958) – Texas Ranger
  - (Season 5 Episode 7: "Texas John Slaughter: Ambush in Laredo") (1958) – Ranger Sam
  - (Season 5 Episode 15: "Texas John Slaughter: Showdown at Sandoval") (1959) – Ranger Sam
  - (Season 6 Episode 4: "The Swamp Fox: The Birth of the Swamp Fox") (1959) – Jenkins / Stunt Man
  - (Season 6 Episode 5: "The Swamp Fox: Brother Against Brother") (1959) – Jenkins
  - (Season 7 Episode 11: "The Swamp Fox: A Woman's Courage") (1961) – Milo (uncredited)
- Yancy Derringer (1959) (Season 1 Episode 34: "Two Tickets to Promontory") – Henchman (uncredited)
- Gunsmoke (1959-1964) (5 episodes)
  - (Season 4 Episode 39: "Cheyennes") (1959) – Sergeant Keller
  - (Season 5 Episode 34: "Speak Me Fair") (1960) – Driver
  - (Season 8 Episode 11: "Abe Blocker") (1962) – Joe
  - (Season 9 Episode 14: "The Glory and the Mud") (1964) – Stage Driver (uncredited)
  - (Season 9 Episode 23: "Comanches Is Soft") (1964) – Husband
- Bat Masterson (1960) (Season 2 Episode 22: "The Disappearance of Bat Masterson") – Henchman about to be Sawn in Half
- Have Gun - Will Travel (1960-1961) (4 episodes)
  - (Season 3 Episode 36: "The Campaign of Billy Banjo") (1960) – Rancher
  - (Season 4 Episode 13: "The Legacy") (1960) – Pike
  - (Season 4 Episode 38: "Soledad Crossing") (1961) – Man Guarding River Crossing
  - (Season 5 Episode 10: "Ben Jalisco") (1961) – Carly
- Laramie (1960-1962) (4 episodes)
  - (Season 1 Episode 29: "Midnight Rebellion") (1960) – Burke (uncredited)
  - (Season 2 Episode 20: "Riders of the Night") (1961) – Chet, Gang Member
  - (Season 3 Episode 11: "The Killer Legend") (1961) – Marker
  - (Season 4 Episode 1: "Among the Missing") (1962) – Croft
- The Detectives – episode – Secret Assignment – Enforcer (1961)
- Stagecoach West – episode – A Place of Still Waters – Matt (1961)
- Tales of Wells Fargo – The Traveler – Lee (1962)
- Daniel Boone (1964-1967) (6 episodes)
  - (Season 1 Episode 1: "Ken-Tuck-E") (1964) – Dark Panther
  - (Season 2 Episode 25: "Fifty Rifles") (1966) – Ruffian
  - (Season 2 Episode 29: "The High Cumberland: Part 1") (1966) – Dutch
  - (Season 2 Episode 30: "The High Cumberland: Part 2") (1966) – Dutch
  - (Season 3 Episode 7: "The Matchmaker") (1966) – Shawnee Leader (credited as Charles Roberson)
  - (Season 3 Episode 22: "The Young Ones") (1967) – Lige Henry
- The Virginian (1965) (Season 3 Episode 19: "Six Graves at Cripple Creek") – Wagon Driver
- Bonanza (1966) (Season 8 Episode 2: "Horse of a Different Hue") – Larcher
- Laredo (1966) (Season 2 Episode 1: "The Legend of Midas Mantee") – Rafer
- Lost in Space (1966) (Season 2 Episode 8: "The Deadly Games of Gamma 6") – Alien Giant
- Mister Terrific (1967) (Season 1 Episode 8: "Stanley the Jailbreaker") – Dawson
- The Big Valley (1967) (3 episodes) – Stagecoach Driver
  - (Season 3 Episode 5: "Night in a Small Town")
  - (Season 3 Episode 6: "Ladykiller")
  - (Season 3 Episode 8: "The Disappearance")
- Lancer (1968) (Season 1 Episode 1: "The High Riders") – Paul O'Brien
- Mod Squad (1969) (Season 1 Episode 21: "A Run for the Money") – Caine

== Filmography (stuntman, all uncredited) ==
- Jesse James Rides Again (1947)
- Angel and the Badman (with John Wayne) (1947)
- The Three Musketeers (1948)
- Wake of the Red Witch (with John Wayne) (1948)
- The Fighting Kentuckian (with John Wayne) (1949)
- Rio Grande (with John Wayne) (1950)
- The Last Outpost (1951)
- Blackbeard the Pirate (1952)
- Hondo (with John Wayne) (1953)
- Calamity Jane (1953)
- The Far Country (1954)
- The Man from Laramie (1955)
- The Conqueror (with John Wayne) (1956)
- Red Sundown (1956)
- The Great Locomotive Chase (1956)
- The Searchers (with John Wayne) (1956)
- The Wings of Eagles – Stunt Double: John Wayne (with John Wayne) (1957)
- Forty Guns (1957)
- The Barbarian and the Geisha (with John Wayne) (1958)
- Rio Bravo (with John Wayne) (1959)
- Laramie – TV series (1959)
- The Alamo (with John Wayne) (1960)
- Sergeant Rutledge (1960)
- The Comancheros (with John Wayne) (1961)
- The Man Who Shot Liberty Valance (with John Wayne) (1962)
- Hatari! (with John Wayne) (1962)
- How the West Was Won – Stunt Double: John Wayne (with John Wayne) (1962)
- Gunsmoke (TV series) (1962) (Season 8 Episode 11: "Abe Blocker") – Stunt Double: Chill Wills
- Donovan's Reef (with John Wayne) (1963)
- Cheyenne Autumn – Jessie (uncredited) (1964)
- The Sons of Katie Elder (with John Wayne) (1965)
- The Rounders (1965)
- The War Lord (1965)
- Nevada Smith (1966)
- El Dorado (with John Wayne) (1966)
- The War Wagon (with John Wayne) (1967)
- The Green Berets (with John Wayne) (1968)
- Hellfighters (with John Wayne) (1968)
- The Undefeated (with John Wayne) (1969)
- Chisum (with John Wayne) (1970)
- Rio Lobo (with John Wayne) (1970)
- A Man Called Horse (1970)
- Big Jake – Stunt Double: John Wayne (with John Wayne) (1971)
- Shoot Out (1971)
- The Cowboys – Stunt Double: John Wayne (with John Wayne) (1972)
- The Train Robbers (with John Wayne) (1973)
- Cahill U.S. Marshal (with John Wayne) (1973)
- McQ (with John Wayne) (1974)
- Rooster Cogburn – Stunt Double: John Wayne (with John Wayne) (1975)
- The Shootist (with John Wayne) (1976)
- Blue Thunder (1983)

== Second-unit director ==
- 100 Rifles (1969)
- Beneath the Planet of the Apes (1970)
- The Hawaiians (1970)
