= Escort West =

- Theatrical release poster
- Directed by: Francis D. Lyon
- Screenplay by: Leo Gordon; Fred Hartsook
- Story by: Steven Hayes
- Produced by: Robert E. Morrison; Nate H. Edwards
- Starring: Victor Mature; Faith Domergue; Elaine Stewart
- Cinematography: William H. Clothier
- Edited by: Otto Ludwig
- Music by: Henry Vars
- Production companies: Batjac Productions; Romina Productions
- Distributed by: United Artists
- Release date: January 23, 1959
- Running time: 76 minutes
- Country: United States
- Language: English

Escort West is a 1959 American Western film directed by Francis D. Lyon, and starring Victor Mature, Faith Domergue, and Elaine Stewart. The movie is set after the U.S. Civil War, when a former Confederate officer, played by Victor Mature, and his daughter help some survivors of an Indian massacre. The film was released by United Artists on January 23, 1959.

It was the second of two co-productions between Batjac and Romina Productions. Their first was China Doll (1957).

The movie was filmed largely on the Iverson Movie Ranch in Chatsworth, California, with additional footage shot on the nearby Bell Moving Picture Ranch. The site of the Bell Ranch location shoot remained a mystery for decades until it was discovered on an expedition by film location researchers in early 2015. The researchers found the location by using information from "Escort West" and the first Elvis Presley movie, Love Me Tender, which filmed its climactic sequence at the same site, known as the "Rocky Hill."

== Plot ==
Now that the Civil War is over, former Confederate officer Ben Lassiter and his 10-year-old daughter ride west to Nevada, where they stop off briefly at a stagecoach rest station. There they encounter sisters Beth and Martha Drury, who greet them in different ways. Beth is cordial to Ben, whereas Martha makes no secret of her dislike for rebel soldiers.

Beth is engaged to an army captain, Poole, and plans to travel to Oregon with her sister, whose husband was a Union officer killed in the war. Indians attack the rest station after Ben and his daughter ride off. When he sees warriors with liquor from the way station, Ben doubles back. He finds the Drury sisters safe, hidden in a cellar, plus an Army payroll that the Indians neglected to take.

Ben escorts the women west and intends to deliver the payroll to Poole, who is fighting off Indian attacks himself. Ben's bravery repeatedly impresses Beth, but with each passing hour Martha becomes more unstable. She panics, flees and the Indians kill her. Ben copes with a pair of Army deserters and a renegade scout named Tago along the way, ultimately leading Beth and his daughter to safety.

== Cast ==
- Victor Mature as Ben Lassiter
- Reba Waters as Abbey Lassiter
- Elaine Stewart as Beth Drury
- Faith Domergue as Martha Drury
- Noah Beery Jr. as Lt. Jamison
- William Ching as Capt. Howard Poole
- Harry Carey Jr. as Trooper Travis
- Slim Pickens as Corporal Wheeler
- Rex Ingram as Nelson Walker
- Leo Gordon as Trooper Vogel
- Ken Curtis as Trooper Burch
- X Brands as Tago
- Roy Barcroft as Sgt. Doyle
- John Hubbard as Lt. Weeks
- Claire Du Brey as Mrs. Kate Fenniman
- Syd Saylor as Elwood Fenniman
- Chuck Hayward as Indian
- Charles Soldani as Indian
- Eddie Little Sky as Indian (uncredited)

== Production ==
Francis Lyon originally bought the story for his own Leo Productions. He eventually set up the movie with Batjac.

== See also ==
- List of American films of 1959
