= Andrew V. McLaglen =

British-American film director (1920–2014)

- Born: Andrew Victor McLaglen; July 28, 1920; London, England
- Died: August 30, 2014 (aged 94); Friday Harbor, Washington, U.S.
- Occupation: Director
- Years active: 1945-1991
- Spouse(s): Margarita Harrison (m. 1943; div. 194?) Veda Ann Borg (m. 1946; div. 1958) Sally Pierce (m. 1958; div. 1977) Sheila Greenan (m. 1987; died 2005)
- Children: 4
- Father: Victor McLaglen

Andrew Victor McLaglen (July 28, 1920 – August 30, 2014) was a British-born American film and television director. He was best known for his Westerns and adventure films, often starring John Wayne or James Stewart.

== Early life and career ==
McLaglen was born in London, the son of English actor Victor McLaglen and his wife, Enid Lamont, who had moved to Hollywood in the early 1920s, shortly after his birth. From a film family that included eight uncles and an aunt, McLaglen grew up on movie sets with his parents, as well as John Wayne and John Ford. He attended the Black-Foxe Military Institute, the Carl Curtis School, the Cate School in Santa Barbara, and the University of Virginia.

He was rated 4-F during his World War II enlistment examination. McLaglen explained, "I was as good as in the Army, you know, except when it came to my height. I stood on a scale during the induction physical and the little guy who was taking my height had a stool he had to stand on ...I was six feet, seven. ...The little guy didn't know what to do. I'll always remember that he didn't say a word. He just got down and took a little yellow pad, and he wrote "4F" (unfit for military service because of a physical handicap) on it and gave it to me. ...instead of being in the Army, I spent four years chasing ring corrugations for the P38 all over the factory at Lockheed.

=== Assistant director ===
When the war ended, he wrote to Republic Pictures asking for a job and was made an assistant on Love, Honor and Goodbye (1945). He worked for two years as a general clerk at Republic on movies such as Dakota (1945), then became a second assistant director.

He was an assistant on two Budd Boetticher films, Killer Shark (1950) and Bullfighter and the Lady (1951); on the latter, he was promoted to first assistant director. He was second assistant director on John Ford's The Quiet Man (1952) with his father, and first assistant director on Wild Stallion (1952), Here Come the Marines (1952), Big Jim McLain (1952) with John Wayne, Hellgate (1952), Kansas Pacific (1953), and Fort Vengeance (1953).

He was assistant director on a series of films for John Wayne's company Batjac: Plunder of the Sun (1953), Island in the Sky (1954), The High and the Mighty (1954), Track of the Cat (1954), and Blood Alley (1954).

== Director ==
=== Debut features ===
After several more assistant-director jobs, McLaglen directed his first film, Man in the Vault (1956), written by Burt Kennedy.

It was followed by Gun the Man Down (1956), a Western B movie with James Arness, whom McLaglen got to know making Big Jim McLain; it also starred Angie Dickinson and Harry Carey Jr. He was going to direct Seven Men from Now (1956), but the job went to Boetticher; McLaglen was credited as a producer. McLaglen had impressed James Arness, who arranged for the director to start helming episodes of Gunsmoke. McLaglen directed The Abductors (1957) starring his father, Victor.

=== Television and low budget features ===
In the late 1950s and early 1960s, McLaglen focused on television directing, prolifically directing episodes of The Lineup, Hotel de Paree, Perry Mason (7), Gunslinger (5), Everglades!, Rawhide (6), 116 episodes of Have Gun – Will Travel with Richard Boone, The Lieutenant (4), The Virginian (2), The Travels of Jaimie McPheeters, Wagon Train, and 96 episodes of Gunsmoke. He directed his father in episodes of Rawhide and Have Gun will Travel.

During this time, he directed two low-budget children's films for Robert Lippert released through 20th Century Fox, Freckles (1960) and The Little Shepherd of Kingdom Come (1960). In 1960, McLaglen said he was earning between $57,000 and $59,000 a year (equivalent to $631,215 in 2025).

== Focus on feature films ==
His first big-budget feature film as director was McLintock! (1963) starring John Wayne and Maureen O'Hara. McLaglen later said, "that put me in the big time." The movie, his first of five starring Wayne, was a big success and led to McLaglen being offered another studio feature, Shenandoah (1965), starring James Stewart. It was another success. McLaglen followed it with The Rare Breed (1966), again with Stewart. That year, he said that now he was "supposed to be an outdoor specialist. I'm not knocking it if that's the course fate has allowed I'm to following the course of course, but I but personally I don't feel relegated to that kind of picture.

He directed Monkeys, Go Home! (1967), a Disney movie; The Way West (1967) an epic Western with Kirk Douglas; The Ballad of Josie (1967), a comic Western with Doris Day, made at Universal; the war story The Devil's Brigade (1968) with William Holden, for producer David Wolper; and the western Bandolero! starring Stewart, Raquel Welch, and Dean Martin at Fox.

McLaglen then made three films in a row with John Wayne: Hellfighters (1969), a biopic of Red Adair, for Universal; The Undefeated (1969), a Western with Rock Hudson; and Chisum (1970), a Western for Batjac and Warners.

McLaglen continued to specialise in Westerns. He did One More Train to Rob (1971) with George Peppard, under the director's contract with Universal, then Fools' Parade (1971) with James Stewart and George Kennedy, which McLaglen made for his own company through Columbia and said was his favourite film

He did Something Big starring Dean Martin and Cahill U.S. Marshal (1973) with Wayne and Kennedy. "I don't really have any formula," he said in 1971. "I just use myself as a guide."

=== Return to television ===
McLaglen says, "Then I had a little bit of a lapse" in his career. He returned to television doing episodes of Banacek with Peppard, Hec Ramsey with Richard Boone, and Amy Prentiss. He made some TV movies The Log of the Black Pearl (1975) and Stowaway to the Moon (1975), then returned to features with Mitchell (1975) with Joe Don Baker and The Last Hard Men (1976) with Charlton Heston and James Coburn.

McLaglen made some more TV movies, Banjo Hackett: Roamin' Free (1976), Royce (1976), Murder at the World Series (1977), and Trail of Danger (1978). He also directed episodes of Code R, The Fantastic Journey, and Nashville 99,

=== Adventure films ===
McLaglen was hired to make an adventure film, The Wild Geese (1978), with Richard Burton, Roger Moore, and Richard Harris. McLaglen said the film " was a whole new start for my career". It was a huge success, and McLaglen then made Breakthrough (1979), a war film with Burton; North Sea Hijack (1979), an action film with Moore; The Sea Wolves (1980), a war movie from Euan Lloyd, the producer of The Wild Geese, with Moore and Gregory Peck.

McLaglen returned to television to make The Shadow Riders (1982) with Tom Selleck; The Blue and the Gray, an elaborate miniseries about the Civil War; and Travis McGee (1983) starring Sam Elliott as Travis McGee, a pilot for a proposed series.

He directed Brooke Shields in Sahara (1983), then did two works for TV: The Dirty Dozen: Next Mission (1985) and On Wings of Eagles (1986).

His last feature films were Return from the River Kwai (1989) and Eye of the Widow (1991). McLaglen then retired and moved to San Juan Island, where he directed for the San Juan Island Community Theater.

=== Later years ===
McLaglen later moved to Friday Harbor, Washington, directing plays for San Juan Island Community Theater.

== Personal life ==
McLaglen and his first wife, Margarita Harrison, had one child: Sharon McLaglen Lannan (born 1944).

His second wife, actress Veda Ann Borg, and he were married in 1946 and separated in 1954, divorcing in 1957. They had one child: Andrew Victor McLaglen II (August 3, 1954 – January 16, 2006).

His third wife, Sally Pierce, and he had two children: Josh McLaglen, an assistant director, and Mary McLaglen, a production manager and producer.

=== Death ===
McLaglen died August 30, 2014, age 94, in Friday Harbor, Washington.

== Critical appraisal ==
According to one obituary, "His career in many ways mirrored that of Ted Post, another inexhaustible director of series television and undemanding movies: reliable rather than stylish, both were nimble soldiers of fortune renowned for bringing work in on time and on budget... Like the best journeymen, he took us on some heroic, enjoyable excursions."

== Filmography ==
=== Film ===
- Gun the Man Down — Batjac film (1956)
- Man in the Vault — Batjac Film (1956)
- The Abductors (1957)
- Freckles (1960)
- The Little Shepherd of Kingdom Come (1961)
- McLintock! — With John Wayne (1963)
- Shenandoah — With James Stewart (1965)
- The Rare Breed — With James Stewart (1966)
- Monkeys, Go Home! (1967)
- The Way West (1967)
- The Ballad of Josie (1967)
- The Devil's Brigade (1968)
- Bandolero! — With James Stewart (1968)
- Hellfighters — With John Wayne (1968)
- The Undefeated — With John Wayne (1969)
- Chisum — With John Wayne (1970)
- One More Train to Rob (1971)
- Fools' Parade — With James Stewart (1971)
- Something Big (1971)
- Cahill U.S. Marshal — With John Wayne (1973)
- Mitchell (1975)
- The Last Hard Men (1976)
- The Wild Geese (1978)
- North Sea Hijack (1979)
- Breakthrough (1979)
- The Sea Wolves (1980)
- Sahara (1983)
- Return from the River Kwai (1989)
- Eye of the Widow (1991)

=== Television ===
- Gunsmoke — 96 episodes (1956–1965)
- Have Gun – Will Travel — 116 episodes (1957–1963)
- Perry Mason — 7 episodes — (1958–1960)
- Rawhide — 6 episodes (1959–1962)
- Gunslinger — 5 episodes (1961)
- The Travels of Jaimie McPheeters — episode — The Day of the Taboo Man (1963)
- The Virginian — episode — Smile of a Dragon (1964)
- Wagon Train — episode — The Silver Lady (1965)
- The Magical World of Disney — episode - The Bluegrass Special (1977)
- Banacek — episode — The Three Million Dollar Piracy (1973)
- Amy Prentiss — episode — The Desperate World of Jane Doe (1974)
- Hec Ramsey — episode — Scar Tissue (1974)
- Banacek — episode — Rocket to Oblivion (1974)
- The Log of the Black Pearl — TV movie (1975)
- Stowaway to the Moon — TV movie (1975)
- Banjo Hackett: Roamin' Free - TV movie (1976)
- Royce — TV movie (1976)
- Murder at the World Series — TV movie (1977)
- Trail of Danger — TV movie (1978)
- The Shadow Riders — TV movie (1982)
- The Blue and the Gray — miniseries (1982)
- Travis McGee — TV movie (1983)
- The Dirty Dozen: Next Mission — TV movie (1985)
- On Wings of Eagles — miniseries (1986)

=== Miscellaneous contributions ===
- Dakota — production assistant (uncredited) (1945)
- Bullfighter and the Lady — assistant director (1951)
- Big Jim McLain — assistant director (1952)
- The Quiet Man — 2nd Assistant Director (uncredited) (1952)
- Hondo — unit production manager (1953)
- Plunder of the Sun — assistant director (1953)
- This Is Your Life — episode — Victor McLaglen — himself (1953)
- Island in the Sky — assistant director (1953)
- Kansas Pacific — assistant director (1953)
- The High and the Mighty — assistant director (1954)
- Track of the Cat — assistant director (1954)
- Blood Alley — assistant director (1955)
- Seven Men From Now — Producer (1956)
- This Is Your Life — episode — Ken Curtis — himself (1972)
- The Hollywood Greats — episode — John Wayne — himself (1984)
- The Making of "The Quiet Man" — Video documentary short — himself (1992)
- The Quiet Man: The Joy of Ireland — Video Documentary Short — himself (2002)
- American Masters — episode — John Ford/John Wayne: The Filmmaker and the Legend — himself (2006)
- 100 Years of John Wayne — TV Movie documentary short — himself (2007)
