= William Clothier =

William Clothier may refer to:

- William Clothier (tennis) (1881–1962), American champion player
- William H. Clothier (1903–1996), American film director of photography
