= Ann McCrea =

American film and television actress

- McCrea in 1960
- Born: February 25, 1931 (age 95); DuBois, Pennsylvania, U.S.
- Occupations: Film and television actress
- Years active: 1952–1971

Ann McCrea (born February 25, 1931) is an American film and television actress. She is known for playing Midge Kelsey in the American sitcom television series The Donna Reed Show.

== Life and career ==
McCrea was born in DuBois, Pennsylvania to a Greek mother and Scottish father. At an early age, she decided that she wanted to become an actress after seeing stage plays in New York. McCrea attended a modeling school, and became a cover girl and model. She met Bing Crosby, who encouraged her to move to Hollywood, California.

McCrea began her acting career in 1952, appearing in the film Deadline – U.S.A. playing the uncredited role of "Sally Gardner". She also guest-starred in television programs including Bachelor Father, Mr. Lucky, The Deputy, Johnny Midnight, Tales of Wells Fargo, Rawhide, Perry Mason, McHale's Navy, The Bob Cummings Show, Family Affair and Wendy and Me. McCrea appeared in films such as Will Success Spoil Rock Hunter?, About Mrs. Leslie, Sweethearts on Parade, Welcome to Hard Times, The War Wagon, I Married a Woman, China Doll, Pardners, Singin' in the Rain and The Ladies Man.

From 1963 to 1966, McCrea played Midge Kelsey, the next-door neighbor of the title character, in the American sitcom television series The Donna Reed Show.

== Filmography ==
Films
Year	Title	Role	Note
1967	The War Wagon	Felicia	
1967	Welcome to Hard Times	Flo	
1962	Girls! Girls! Girls!	Mrs. Arthur Morgan	Uncredited
1961	Man-Trap	Arlene-Anders	Uncredited
1960	Simon Lash: The Black Book	Mavis	TV movie
1958	Rock-a-Bye Baby	Secretary	Uncredited
1958	China Doll	Mona Perkins	
1958	I Married a Woman	Luxenburg Girl	Uncredited
1957	Kiss Them for Me	Lucille	Uncredited
1957	The Sad Sack	Girl on Train	Uncredited
1957	Will Success Spoil Rock Hunter?	Gladys	
1956	Pardners	Dance Hall Girl	Uncredited
1955	Artists and Models	Janet	Uncredited
1954	About Mrs. Leslie	Precious - Nightclub Girl	Uncredited
1954	River of No Return	Dance Hall Girl	Uncredited
1953	Sweethearts on Parade	Flo	
1953	The Band Wagon	Chorus Member in Hotel Suite	Uncredited
1953	I Love Melvin	Chorine	Uncredited
1952	Singin' in the Rain	Chorus Girl	Uncredited
1952	Deadline - U.S.A.	Sally Gardener	Uncredited

Television
Year	Title	Role	Note
1966–1971	My Three Sons	Mrs. Webber / Nurse #2 / Mrs. Masters / Mrs. Crawford / Betty	
1966–1968	Family Affair	Clara / Mrs. Bowers	
1963–1966	The Donna Reed Show	Midge Kelsey / Midge	
1964–1965	Wendy and Me	Mrs. Ferguson	
1964	No Time for Sergeants	Amelia Taggert	
1963	McHale's Navy	Carol Kimberly	
1962	Shannon	Phyllis Gray	
1961–1962	Surfside 6	Lola Scott / Maggie	
1961	Coronado 9	Linda Bowen	
1961	Assignment: Underwater	May Stanley	
1961	The Brothers Brannagan	Martha	
1959–1960	Bachelor Father	Lila West / Diana Rogers	
1960	Johnny Midnight	Winette 'Winnie' LaRonde / Eileen	
1960	The Deputy	Helen Swayde	
1960	Mr. Lucky	Deena	
1960	Tales of Wells Fargo	Sarah	
1952–1960	Death Valley Days	Barmaid / Merinda Pratt / Lucy	
1960	Black Saddle	Liz Buckley	
1960	The DuPont Show with June Allyson	Ann	
1959	One Step Beyond	Ann Morris	
1959	Rawhide	Woman	
1959	Tightrope!	Lucille	
1959	Colonel Humphrey Flack	Diane	
1959	Rescue 8	Janet Pauson	
1958	Pursuit		
1958	The Thin Man	Billie Benson	
1958	Perry Mason	Margo Garvin	
1957–1958	State Trooper	Delphine Schigalo / Debbie Lang	
1958	Cheyenne	Faith Swain	
1958	The Adventures of McGraw	Francine Denquist	
1956	The Bob Cummings Show		
1955	The Man Behind the Badge	Laura	
