= Dominic Frontiere =

American composer and musical artist (1931–2017)

- Frontiere in 1957

Background information
- Born: Dominic Carmen Frontiere; June 17, 1931; New Haven, Connecticut, U.S.
- Died: December 21, 2017 (aged 86) Tesuque, New Mexico, U.S.
- Occupations: Composer, arranger, musician
- Instrument: Accordion
- Spouses: Maureen Cecelia Ahern (m. 1960, divorced) Cicely Evans (m. 1967; div. 1978) Georgia Frontiere (m. 1980; div. 1988): Robin Frontiere (m. ??)
- Children: 5

Dominic Carmen Frontiere (June 17, 1931 – December 21, 2017) was an American composer, arranger, and jazz accordionist. He composed the theme and much of the music for the first season of the television series The Outer Limits, as well as the theme songs for The Rat Patrol and 12 O'Clock High. He was the winner of both a Golden Globe Award and an Emmy Award.

== Biography ==
=== Early years ===
Born in New Haven, Connecticut, the son of a musical family, at age seven Frontiere was already playing several instruments before deciding to concentrate on the accordion. At age twelve, he played a solo recital at Carnegie Hall.

=== Hollywood ===
After a period with The Horace Heidt Orchestra in the late 1940s and early 1950s, Frontiere moved to Los Angeles, where he enrolled at University of California, Los Angeles. He eventually became musical director at 20th Century Fox. He scored several films under the tutelage of Alfred and Lionel Newman, while also recording jazz music. He composed the music for two exotica LP records Pagan Festival (1959) and Love Eyes, The Mood of Romance (1960).

An association with director and producer Leslie Stevens began with Frontiere scoring The Marriage-Go-Round (1961). This association led to several projects, such as his innovative blend of music and sound effects for The Outer Limits. The relationship led Frontiere to became production manager and executive of television and film production company Daystar Productions, a company Stevens ran. He composed several famous television themes of the 1960s, such as those for The Rat Patrol, Branded, The Flying Nun, and for producer Quinn Martin The Invaders, The Fugitive, and 12 O'Clock High.

After scoring for television shows, he went on to compose the music for the Clint Eastwood film Hang 'Em High. The title theme for that movie became a top-10 hit for the group Booker T. & the M.G.'s. He also composed the soundtrack to the 1971 motorcycle documentary On Any Sunday, which featured Steve McQueen and was directed by Bruce Brown. He composed the scores of three films starring John Wayne, Chisum (1970), The Train Robbers (1973) and Brannigan (1975). He also was the musical director of the 1970 TV special Swing Out, Sweet Land that was hosted by Wayne, for which Frontiere won an Emmy Award for Outstanding Achievement In Music Direction Of A Variety, Musical Or Dramatic Program.

Frontiere became head of the music department at Paramount Pictures in the early 1970s, where he again worked on television and film scores, while concurrently orchestrating popular music albums for, among others, Chicago. Examples of Frontiere's sweeping, cinematic orchestrations appear in the opening and closing songs of the 1977 album Nether Lands by Dan Fogelberg. He won a Golden Globe Award for the score to the 1980 film The Stunt Man. He also composed a jingle for the studio's television division. Frontiere composed a theme for the lion Togar that was featured in the film Roar.

=== Tax evasion conviction ===
In 1986, Frontiere was incarcerated for nine months in a federal penitentiary after scalping tickets to the 1980 Super Bowl, which he obtained through his then-wife, Los Angeles Rams owner Georgia Frontiere. He was estimated to have scalped as many as 16,000 tickets, making a half million dollars in profit that he did not report to the Internal Revenue Service. Frontiere pleaded guilty and was sentenced to a year and one day in prison, three years probation, and fined $15,000 for failing to report income from the sale of the tickets and for lying to the IRS. Georgia Frontiere filed for divorce shortly after Dominic's release from prison.

=== Death ===
Frontiere died on December 21, 2017, at the age of 86 in Tesuque, New Mexico, where he lived.

== Selected works ==
Television

- 1961: The New Breed
- 1962: Stoney Burke
- 1963: The Outer Limits (first season only)
- 1964: 12 O'Clock High
- 1965: Branded
- 1966: The Rat Patrol
- 1966: Iron Horse
- 1967: The Invaders
- 1967: The Fugitive
- 1967: The Flying Nun
- 1970: The Immortal
- 1970: The Silent Force
- 1970: Swing Out, Sweet Land (TV special)
- 1972: Search
- 1974: Chopper One
- 1974: Movin' On
- 1977: Washington: Behind Closed Doors
- 1978: Perfect Gentlemen
- 1978: Vega$
- 1981: Strike Force
- 1982: Don't Go to Sleep
- 1982: Matt Houston

Film

- 1960: One Foot in Hell
- 1961: The Marriage-Go-Round
- 1965: Billie
- 1966: Incubus
- 1968: Hang 'Em High
- 1969: Popi
- 1969: Number One
- 1970: Chisum
- 1971: On Any Sunday
- 1972: Hammersmith Is Out
- 1973: The Train Robbers
- 1973: A Name for Evil
- 1974: Freebie and the Bean
- 1975 Cleopatra Jones and the Casino of Gold
- 1975: Brannigan
- 1976: The Gumball Rally
- 1980: Defiance
- 1980: The Stunt Man
- 1981: Roar (credited as the composer of "Togar's Theme")
- 1981: Modern Problems
- 1985: The Aviator
- 1994: Color of Night
