= William H. Clothier =

American cinematographer (1903–1996)

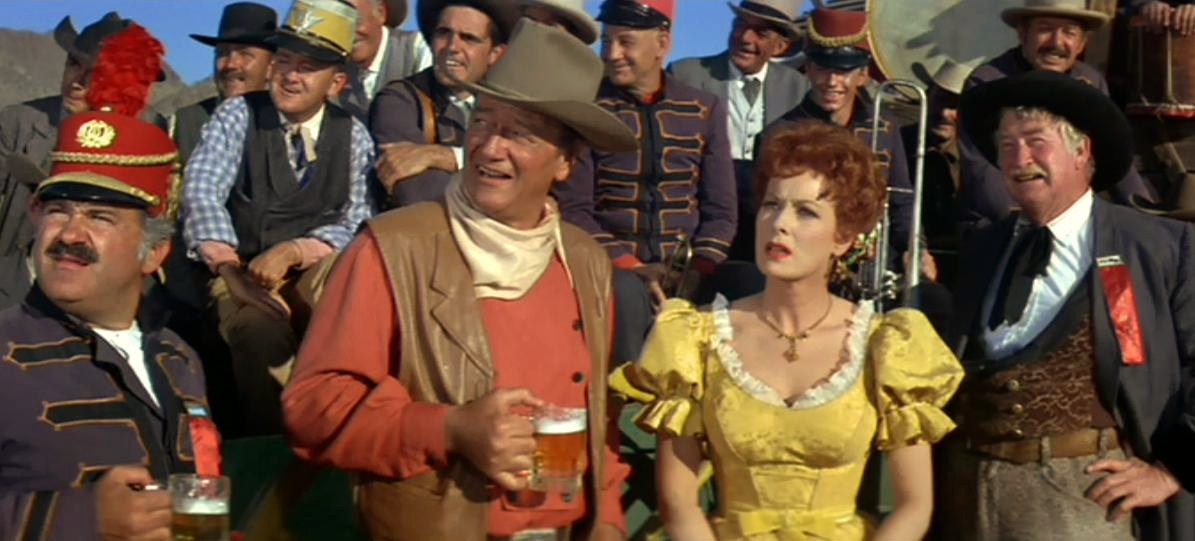
- L. to R. : Jack Kruschen, John Wayne, Maureen O'Hara & Chill Wills in McLintock!
- Born: February 21, 1903; Decatur, Illinois, U.S.
- Died: January 7, 1996 (aged 92); Los Angeles, California, U.S.
- Occupation: Cinematographer

William H. Clothier, ASC (February 21, 1903 – January 7, 1996) was an American cinematographer and television producer, best known as the favored director of photography for John Wayne. He was twice nominated for the Academy Award for Best Cinematography, for The Alamo (1960) and Cheyenne Autumn (1964). He received the American Society of Cinematographers' President's Award in 1995.

== Biography ==
Born in Decatur, Illinois, Clothier entered the film industry painting sets at Warner Bros., and at the end of the silent era began photographing such films as Wings (1927) and Ernst Lubitsch's The Patriot (1928). Between 1933 and 1938, he worked in Spain, where he was imprisoned during the Spanish Civil War. In August 1943, he became the first commanding officer of the new 4th Combat Camera Unit 4th Combat Camera Squadron (4th CCU). He advanced to a lieutenant colonel in the United States Air Force during World War II, and flew seventeen missions on the Memphis Belle.

In 1955, Clothier filmed The Sea Chase, his first project as Director of Photography with John Wayne, after which the actor signed him to a contract with his Batjac Productions. The two went on to collaborate on 21 more films, including John Ford's The Man Who Shot Liberty Valance. He retired in 1972 after filming The Train Robbers for Burt Kennedy.

Clothier was nominated for two Academy Awards for Best Cinematography for The Alamo (1960) and Cheyenne Autumn (1964). His work on numerous Westerns earned him the 1973 Heritage Award from the Cowboy Hall of Fame, and he received the American Society of Cinematographers President's Award in 1995.

== Filmography ==
=== Cinematographer ===
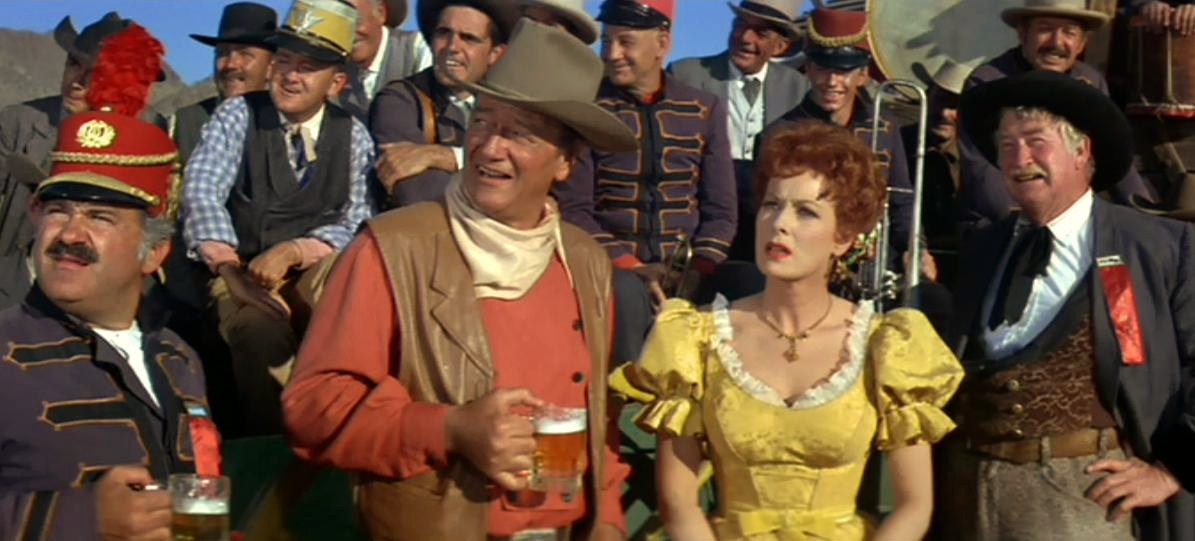
A cropped screenshot of the 1963 film McLintock!, on which Clothier worked as cinematographer

Year	Title	Director
1936	Corner in Madrid	León Artola
1948	Fort Apache (Note: with Archie Stout)	John Ford
1950	Once a Thief	W. Lee Wilder
1954	Track of the Cat	William A. Wellman
1955	The Sea Chase	John Farrow
1955	Blood Alley	William A. Wellman
1956	Gun the Man Down	Andrew V. McLaglen
1956	Man in the Vault	Andrew V. McLaglen
1956	Good-bye, My Lady	William A. Wellman
1956	Seven Men from Now	Budd Boetticher
1957	Dragoon Wells Massacre	Harold D. Schuster
1958	China Doll	Frank Borzage
1958	Darby's Rangers	William A. Wellman
1959	Escort West	Francis D. Lyon
1959	The Horse Soldiers	John Ford
1960	The Alamo	John Wayne
1961	The Deadly Companions	Sam Peckinpah
1961	The Comancheros	Michael Curtiz
1962	Merrill's Marauders	Samuel Fuller
1962	The Man Who Shot Liberty Valance	John Ford
1963	Donovan's Reef	John Ford
1963	McLintock!	Andrew V. McLaglen
1964	A Distant Trumpet	Raoul Walsh
1964	Cheyenne Autumn	John Ford
1965	Shenandoah	Andrew V. McLaglen
1966	The Rare Breed	Andrew V. McLaglen
1966	Stagecoach	Gordon Douglas
1967	The Way West	Andrew V. McLaglen
1968	The Devil's Brigade	Andrew V. McLaglen
1968	Firecreek	Vincent McEveety
1968	Bandolero!	Andrew V. McLaglen
1968	Hellfighters	Andrew V. McLaglen
1969	The Undefeated	Andrew V. McLaglen
1970	The Cheyenne Social Club	Gene Kelly
1970	Chisum	Andrew V. McLaglen
1970	Rio Lobo	Howard Hawks
1971	Big Jake	George Sherman
1973	The Train Robbers	Burt Kennedy

=== Other ===
Year	Title	Role
1927	Wings	Camera operator
1932	The Big Stampede	Camera operator
1933	King Kong	First assistant camera
1953	Island in the Sky	Aerial cameraman
1954	The High and the Mighty	Aerial cameraman
1957 (Note: Originally filmed in 1949 but not released until 1957)	Jet Pilot	Aerial cameraman

=== TV ===
- Cheyenne - episode - Fury at Rio Hondo - Director of Photography (1956)
- Gang Busters - 4 episodes - Director of Photography (1952-1955)

== Other works ==
- The Hollywood Greats - episode - John Wayne - Himself (1984)
- John Wayne's The Alamo - Video Documentary - Himself (1992)
