= Man in the Vault =

1956 film by Andrew V. McLaglen

- Film poster
- Directed by: Andrew V. McLaglen
- Screenplay by: Burt Kennedy
- Based on: novel The Lock and the Key by Frank Gruber
- Produced by: Robert E. Morrison; John Wayne (uncredited)
- Starring: William Campbell; Karen Sharpe; Anita Ekberg
- Cinematography: William H. Clothier
- Music by: Henry Vars
- Production company: Batjac Productions
- Distributed by: RKO Radio Pictures
- Release date: December 21, 1956 (US)
- Running time: 73 minutes
- Country: United States
- Language: English

Man in the Vault is a 1956 film noir about a locksmith, played by William Campbell, who is forced to help gangsters commit a robbery. The screenplay by Burt Kennedy was based on the novel The Lock and the Key by Frank Gruber. The film was the directorial debut of Andrew V. McLaglen.

== Plot ==
Willis Trent wants to rob the safety deposit box of a crooked Los Angeles businessman, Paul De Camp. He has lawyer Earl Farraday smooth-talk the guy's girlfriend, the two-timing Flo Randall, into revealing the bank box's number.

Now they need a locksmith. A henchman called Herbie is sent to find one. He settles on Tommy Dancer, who works as a locksmith. Tommy is quickly smitten with Earl's girl Betty Turner, but is a law-abiding citizen and rejects an offer of $5,000. Tommy takes Betty to the Hollywood Bowl and learns she comes from a wealthy family. Tommy's attentions to her get him a beating from Louie, another big thug. He is told Betty's face will be disfigured if he refuses to cooperate.

Breaking into the box is no problem, but Tommy thinks he has been double-crossed by Betty and decides to keep the $200,000. He stashes the cash in a locker at the bowling alley. Flo confesses her part in the scheme to De Camp, who goes after Tommy, hurling bowling balls and shooting at him before the cops show up. Tommy races to save Betty, realizing she is on the level. Trent ends up dead.

== Cast ==
- William Campbell as Tommy Dancer
- Karen Sharpe as Betty Turner
- Anita Ekberg as Flo Randall
- Berry Kroger as Willis Trent
- Paul Fix as Herbie
- James Seay as Paul De Camp
- Mike Mazurki as Louie
- Robert Keys as Earl Farraday
- Nancy Duke as Trent's girlfriend
- Gonzales Gonzales as Pedro
- John Mitchum as Andy (uncredited)

== Production ==
The film contains extensive location shooting around Los Angeles, for the scenes in the bowling alley, bank, and street encounters. The striking opening scene was shot at John Wayne's Encino house (Wayne was a principal in the Batjac Productions organization that produced the film), and the climactic ending was filmed along Marmont Lane, above the visible, distinctive Chateau Marmont building.
