= Gun the Man Down =

1956 film by Andrew V. McLaglen

- Theatrical poster
- Directed by: Andrew V. McLaglen
- Screenplay by: Burt Kennedy
- Story by: Sam C. Freedle
- Produced by: Robert E. Morrison
- Starring: James Arness; Angie Dickinson
- Cinematography: William H. Clothier
- Edited by: Everett Sutherland
- Music by: Henry Vars
- Production company: Batjac Productions
- Distributed by: United Artists
- Release date: November 15, 1956
- Running time: 76 minutes
- Country: United States
- Language: English

Gun the Man Down is a 1956 American Western film directed by Andrew V. McLaglen and starring James Arness and Angie Dickinson in her first leading role. The film was produced by Robert E. Morrison for his brother John Wayne's company Batjac Productions. It was the second theatrical feature directed by McLaglen, who was a prolific director of television westerns. It was also an early screenplay by Burt Kennedy.

== Plot ==
Three outlaws rob a bank, but one of them is wounded. His two partners kidnap his girlfriend, take his share of the money and run off, leaving him to be captured by the sheriff. One year later, after he gets out of prison, he goes in search of his double-crossing partners and his girlfriend. He finds them in a semi-deserted, run-down town, but instead of killing them right away, he decides to play cat-and-mouse with them first.

== Cast ==
- James Arness as Remington "Rem" Anderson
- Angie Dickinson as Janice
- Emile Meyer as Sheriff Morton
- Robert J. Wilke as Matt Rankin
- Harry Carey, Jr. as Deputy Lee
- Don Megowan as Ralph Farley
- Michael Emmet as Billy Deal
- Pedro Gonzalez Gonzalez as hotel man
- Robert Hinkle as Second Sheriff (uncredited)
- Al Haskell as posse rider (uncredited)
- Frank Fenton as Sheriff leading posse (uncredited)

== Production notes ==
Gun the Man Down remains arguably most notable for containing actress Angie Dickinson's first starring (credited) role. She would go on to star in successful films such as Rio Bravo opposite John Wayne and Dean Martin, Ocean's Eleven with Frank Sinatra and Dean Martin, Captain Newman, M.D. opposite Gregory Peck, The Killers (in which she is slapped in the face by villain Ronald Reagan) and Point Blank, both opposite Lee Marvin, and The Chase with Marlon Brando and Robert Redford.

James Arness was recommended by Gun the Man Down uncredited producer John Wayne for the role of Marshal Matt Dillon in the television version of Gunsmoke, a part Arness played for the next twenty years. Wayne introduced the series in a film clip shown immediately before the initial episode while dressed in cowboy garb and speaking directly to the camera. Arness had earlier portrayed the Frankenstein-like "carrot monster" glimpsed in flashes and the conclusion of Howard Hawks' 1951 version of The Thing. Arness, possibly on his way to becoming a fixture in science fiction films, also starred in the 1954 giant ant movie Them! in his natural blond hair. Arness' brother was actor Peter Graves. Except for a gag cameo in the Bob Hope comedy Alias Jesse James, it was his final theatrical film before devoting himself exclusively to television.

Andrew V. McLaglen, the film's director, was the son of actor and former boxer Victor McLaglen, and went on to direct ninety-six episodes of Gunsmoke starring James Arness, as well as five movies starring John Wayne, among many others. Gun the Man Down also remains notable for being the first of many westerns McLaglen directed.

This was also the second screenplay by Burt Kennedy, who became a prolific writer of westerns, particularly those directed by Budd Boetticher, before becoming a director himself in the 1960s. Kennedy had just written his first script, Seven Men from Now, while under contract to John Wayne's company, Batjac but there were no plans to make it. He was called in to rewrite Gun the Man Down.
