= Seven Men from Now =

1956 film by Budd Boetticher

- Theatrical release poster
- Directed by: Budd Boetticher
- Written by: Burt Kennedy
- Produced by: Robert E. Morrison; Andrew V. McLaglen
- Starring: Randolph Scott; Gail Russell; Lee Marvin
- Cinematography: William H. Clothier
- Edited by: Everett Sutherland
- Music by: Henry Vars
- Color process: WarnerColor
- Production company: Batjac Productions
- Distributed by: Warner Bros. Pictures
- Release date: August 4, 1956
- Running time: 78 minutes
- Country: United States
- Language: English

Seven Men from Now (also billed as 7 Men from Now) is a 1956 American Western film directed by Budd Boetticher and starring Randolph Scott, Gail Russell and Lee Marvin. The film was written by Burt Kennedy and produced by John Wayne's Batjac Productions.

== Plot ==
During a nighttime rainstorm, a man named Ben Stride walks into a desert cave encampment, encounters two men taking shelter next to a fire and asks to join them. Stride says he is from the town of Silver Springs. They later discuss a robbery and murder that recently occurred there. When Stride realizes who the men are, he guns them down.

While tracking through the Arizona wilderness, Stride comes upon a wagon stuck in the mud. Stride helps pull the wagon clear. Travelers from Kansas City, the wagon's owners, John and Annie Greer, admit they are inexperienced at frontier life and ask Stride to ride with them as they head south to the border town of Flora Vista on their way west to California. Greer says he hopes to find a sales job there, but has been taking odd jobs along the way. The mention of Flora Vista arouses Stride's curiosity and he agrees to take them to the border. They are eventually stopped by a US Army detail, whose commanding officer tells them to go back, as Chiricahua Apache have been spotted in the area.

Stride and the Greers travel on to a stagecoach relay station where they encounter Bill Masters and Clete, two former nemeses of Stride's. As they all spend the night at the station, Masters tells the Greers that Stride was once the sheriff of Silver Springs, and his wife was killed during the robbery of the Wells Fargo freight office. Stride has been tracking and killing the seven men who performed the robbery, and Masters intends to abscond with the $20,000 in gold they stole once Stride has accomplished his task. Before the wagon heads out of the station, with Masters and Clete tagging along opportunistically, they are met by Chiricahua warriors. The Apache leave when Stride gives up one of the horses to the hungry tribesmen.

The group encounters one of the Wells Fargo robbers, who is being chased by the Apache. Unaware of the man's part in the robbery, Stride saves him. The man, however, recognizes Stride and attacks him. Stride is saved when Masters shoots the man in the back.

Masters and Clete reach Flora Vista ahead of the wagon, and meet with the Wells Fargo bandits waiting for delivery of their gold. Masters tells their leader, Payte Bodeen, that Stride is heading in their direction to kill all of them. Bodeen dispatches two bandits to meet Stride before he can reach Flora Vista. Meanwhile, Stride leaves Greer and Annie, telling them to continue on without him. Stride rides ahead into a canyon and is ambushed by the bank robbers but kills them both. Wounded in the leg, Stride is knocked unconscious while trying to ride away with one of the bandits' horses.

The Greers find Stride and tend to him. Stride regains consciousness and overhears Greer admitting to his wife that he was paid $500 to deliver the Wells Fargo box containing the gold to Flora Vista. Stride takes the gold away from Greer to draw the rest of the bandits out from town, and Greer and Annie head into Flora Vista to notify the local sheriff to get help for Stride.

Greer arrives in town without the gold, telling Bodeen that Stride has it. Later, as Greer walks down the street toward the sheriff's office, Bodeen shoots him dead. The last two bandits, Bodeen and Clint, ride out to confront Stride. Stride shoots Clint but Bodeen is killed by Masters and Clete. Masters, blinded by greed, then kills Clete and walks out into the clearing where Stride has placed the box of gold. They face off, and Stride eventually kills Masters.

Stride returns the gold to Wells Fargo in Flora Vista, and tells Annie, who is continuing on to California, that he is going to take a job as a deputy sheriff in Silver Springs. He invites her to drop in on him if she is ever in Silver Springs. He puts her on a stagecoach bound for California, then rides away. Annie watches him ride off, then tells the stage driver she is not going.

== Cast ==
- Randolph Scott as Ben Stride
- Gail Russell as Annie Greer
- Lee Marvin as Bill Masters
- Walter Reed as John Greer
- John Larch as Payte Bodeen
- Don 'Red' Barry as Clete
- Fred Graham as Henchman
- John Beradino as Clint
- John Phillips as Jed
- Chuck Roberson as Mason
- Stuart Whitman as Cavalry Lt. Collins
- Pamela Duncan as Señorita Nellie
- Steve Mitchell as Fowler
- Cliff Lyons as Henchman
- Chet Brandenburg as Townsman (uncredited)
- Chick Hannan as Townsman (uncredited)
- Cap Somers as Townsman (uncredited)
- George Sowards as Stage Driver (uncredited)
- Fred Sherman as The Prospector

== Production ==
Burt Kennedy was under contract to John Wayne and Robert Fellows's production company Batjac to write a proposed TV series as a vehicle for Pedro Gonzalez Gonzalez. While under contract he also wrote the script for Seven Men from Now.

According to Kennedy, Wayne wasn't particularly interested in the script until he became aware that Robert Mitchum's representatives were interested in it, at which point Wayne expressed interest in making it for Warners. Wayne was unable to do it as he was contracted to make The Searchers for John Ford. According to Kennedy, the script was sent to Joel McCrea who turned it down, then Robert Preston, then Randolph Scott, who accepted.

Scott insisted on Budd Boetticher as the director. As with their previous collaboration, Bullfighter and the Lady, Wayne, in his role as producer, recut Seven Men From Now without Boetticher's approval, although it has since been restored to the director's original vision.

The movie was shot in the Alabama Hills and other locations near Lone Pine, California in the last months of 1955. Gail Russell was cast as the female lead due to her previous work with Wayne in Angel and the Badman and Wake of the Red Witch, in which Wayne's wife at the time accused them of having an affair (denied by both and rejected by the court during Wayne's divorce proceedings). She had not worked on a movie for nearly five years prior to Seven Men from Now, due to her struggles with stage-fright-induced alcoholism.

== See also ==
- List of American films of 1956
