= China Doll (film) =

1958 film

- Theatrical lobby card
- Directed by: Frank Borzage
- Written by: Thomas F. Kelly; James Benson Nablo
- Screenplay by: Kitty Buhler
- Produced by: Frank Borzage
- Starring: Victor Mature; Li Li-Hua
- Cinematography: William H. Clothier
- Edited by: Jack Murray
- Music by: Henry Vars
- Production companies: Batjac Productions; Romina Productions
- Distributed by: United Artists (US)
- Release dates: June 8, 1958 (UK); December 3, 1958 (U.S.)
- Running time: 99 minutes
- Country: United States
- Language: English

China Doll (a.k.a. Time Is a Memory) is a 1958 romantic drama film set in the China Burma India theater of World War II and starring Victor Mature and Li Li-Hua. It represented a return to films for director Frank Borzage who had taken a 10-year hiatus. (Note: While Borzage was on a self-imposed semi-retirement, he never stopped working on film projects, including taking a role as an actor in Jeanne Eagels (1957).)

The film's copyright was renewed.

== Plot ==
In 1943, Captain Cliff Brandon is a cargo aircraft pilot supplying the Allied troops fighting the Japanese in Kunming, Yunnan, southwestern China. When he is not flying or training his new crew hard, he is usually drinking in the local bar.

One night, while stumbling home drunk, he encounters an old Chinese man from Chongqing who offers him a girl, his daughter Shu-Jen. Brandon pays him, but when he sees the young woman, he tells the old man to keep her. When he wakes up the next morning, he finds Shu-Jen there. After Father Cairns, a longtime resident missionary in China, expresses his disapproval, Brandon tries his best to get rid of her, assigning the task to Ellington, a young Chinese boy who speaks English well. Ellington tries to sell her into prostitution, but Father Cairns happens by and takes Shu-Jen back to Brandon.

The priest finds out that Shu-Jen's father was a farmer who lost his land to the Japanese invaders. Destitute, he sold his daughter's services for three months to feed the rest of his large family. Cairns tells Brandon that, if he were to send the girl back, the old man would return the desperately needed money. So, over Brandon's protests, the priest gets him to keep the girl; Brandon tells her that she is there only as a housekeeper. He makes Ellington his live-in interpreter.

Over time, however, love blooms, and Shu-Jen becomes pregnant. They get married in a traditional Chinese ceremony. After he is transferred to another base, she gives birth to their daughter. Later, they are reunited.

While Brandon is flying a mission, the base is attacked. The returning flight is ordered to divert to a different airfield, but Brandon disobeys and lands his aircraft. When he cannot locate his family, he orders his crew to leave with the survivors. Then he finds Shu-Jen and Ellington both dead, but his daughter is alive. He puts his dog tag around her neck, then mans an anti-aircraft gun and shoots down one or two enemy aircraft before he is killed.

In 1957, his former crewmates and their wives anxiously await the arrival in the United States of Brandon's daughter, found in an orphanage in British Hong Kong by Father Cairns, still with her father's dog tag.

== Cast ==
The dichotomy of the burly Mature with the diminutive Li Li-Hua was evident in their scenes.

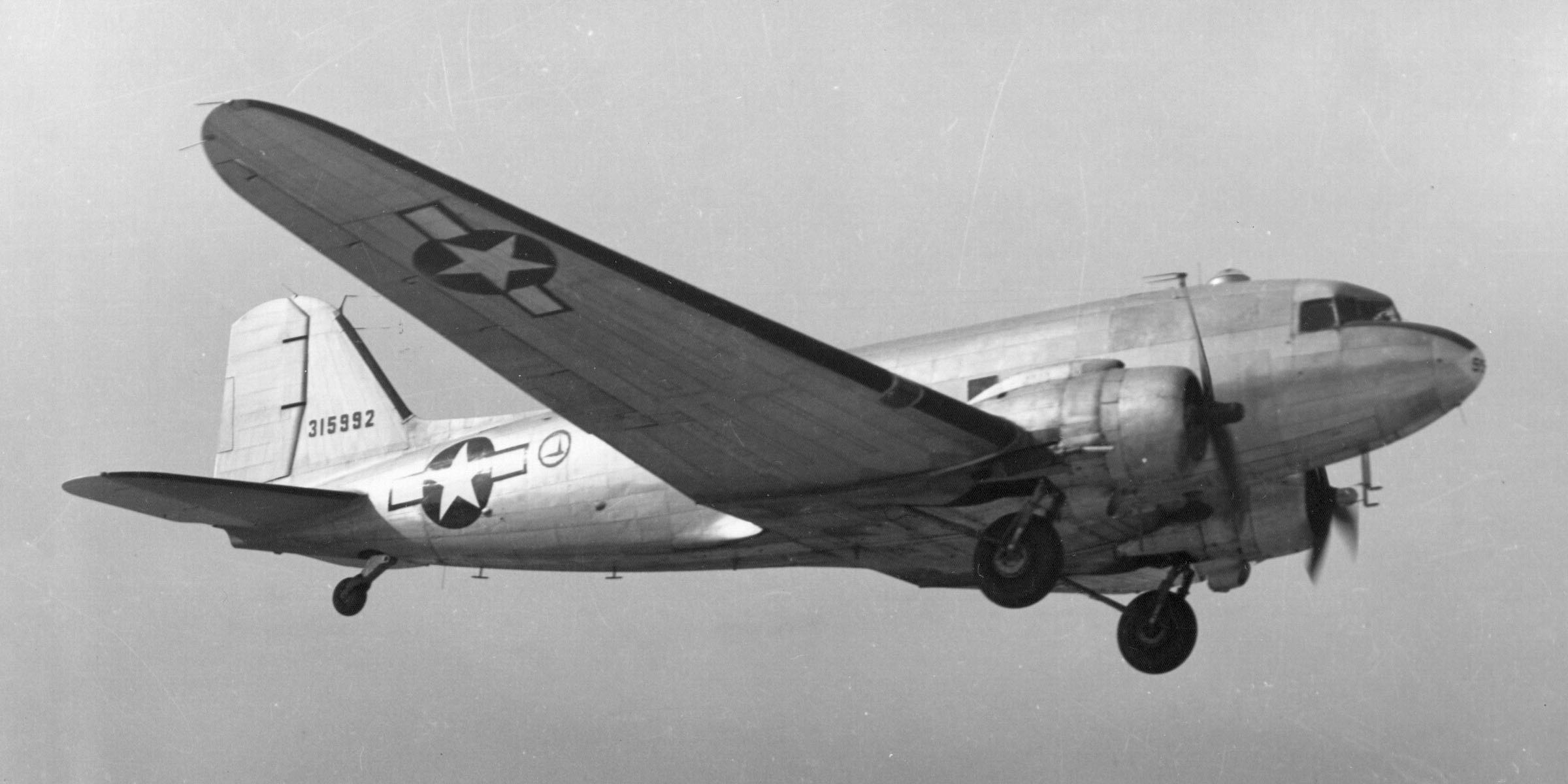
The Douglas C-47 Skytrain transport aircraft was featured predominantly in the film.

- Victor Mature as Cliff Brandon
- Li Li Hua as Shu-Jen
- Ward Bond as Father Cairns
- Bob Mathias as Phil Gates
- Johnny Desmond as Steve Hill
- Stuart Whitman as Dan O'Neill
- Elaine Curtis as Alice Nichols
- Ann McCrea as Mona Perkins
- Danny Chang as Ellington
- Denver Pyle as Col. Wiley
- Donald Barry as Hal Foster
- Tige Andrews as Carlo Menotti
- Steve Mitchell as Dave Reisner
- Ken Perry as Ernie Fleming
- Ann Paige as Sally
- Gregg Barton
- Barry O'Hara

== Production ==
China Doll had lingered on Borzage's desk from 1953 as an earlier story, The China Story. Starting out with the working title of Time Is a Memory, the film was the first co-production of Batjac Productions and Romina Productions; the next and last co-production was Escort West (1959), a western, also starring Victor Mature.

Borzage had been a successful director throughout the 1920s and reached his peak in the late silent and early sound era with such noted films as Seventh Heaven (1927), Street Angel (1928), Bad Girl (1931) and A Farewell to Arms (1932). (Note: Borzage won the Academy Award for Directing for Seventh Heaven and Bad Girl.) During the 1940s, his films were not as well received and after the film noir, Moonrise (1948), Borzage had stopped directing. China Doll marked his return to Hollywood, although he only completed one more film, The Big Fisherman (1959), while his last effort, L'Atlantide (1961), had to be finished by others due to his illness.

The film was also known as Time is a Memory and shooting started August 15, 1957.

Borzage and Victor Mature intended China Doll to be the first of several films they would make together, others including The Incorrigibles and Vaults of Heaven.

Principal photography took place in 1958 with location shooting at Saugus, California. To faithfully recreate the Kunming Airfield, documentary footage from World War II was incorporated. Although aerial action in China Doll took a secondary role compared to the melodrama that predominated, the following aircraft were featured:

- Bell P-39 Airacobra fighters
- Consolidated B-24 Liberator bombers
- Curtiss P-40 Warhawk fighters
- Douglas C-47 Skytrain transports
- Grumman F6F Hellcat fighters
- Grumman TBF Avenger bombers
- Kawasaki Ki-61 fighter
- Mitsubishi Ki-21 medium bombers
- Mitsubishi Ki-51 light bomber
- Northrop A-17 bomber
- Republic P-47 Thunderbolt fighter

Li Li Hua had been under contract to Cecil B. De Mille who had considered her for The Buccaneer.

== Reception ==
China Doll received favorable critical reviews at the time of its release. Variety noted the film had, "the warmth and humor of a romance between a burly air corps captain and a fragile oriental beauty." Howard Thompson, reviewer for The New York Times found it "(a) familiar war drama (that) has some winning aspects. ... Under Mr. Borzage's leisurely, gentle staging, the love story dominates the picture."

More recent reviews have also been positive. A review by Dan Callahan laid out the tropes of his earlier works were present: "China Doll is a delicate, spare, old man's movie, with quiet attention to character detail (even Ward Bond's priest is sensitive and thoughtful). There's a melancholy, pessimistic slant to the dialogue that isn't lingered over; the movements of the actors and the compositions are so stylized and presentational that it almost feels, at magical times, like a silent film. The ending is surprisingly violent, even brutal, but in a brief coda, Borzage observes the regeneration of beauty in the couple's child, even as he has shown the lovers' bond and their kindness viciously wiped out by war."

== See also ==
- List of American films of 1958
