= James Edward Grant =

American film writer (1905–1966)

- Born: July 2, 1905; Chicago, Illinois, U.S.
- Died: February 19, 1966 (aged 60); Burbank, California, U.S.
- Occupation: Writer
- Years active: 1935–1966

James Edward Grant (July 2, 1905 – February 19, 1966) was an American short-story writer, screenwriter, and film director, who contributed to more than 50 films between 1935 and 1971. He collaborated with John Wayne on 12 projects, starting with Angel and the Badman (which he also directed) in 1947 through Circus World in 1964. Support Your Local Gunfighter was released in 1971, five years after his death.

== Biography ==
Grant was born in Chicago. Originally a journalist in his home town, he wrote a short story, "The Whipsaw", for the 11 Aug 1934 issue of Liberty magazine. It was turned into the 1935 movie Whipsaw, with Spencer Tracy and Myrna Loy, which launched his screenwriting career.

Grant wrote numerous short stories that were published in Argosy, The Saturday Evening Post, Cosmopolitan, and Liberty, among others.

He also wrote a play, Plan M.

John Wayne called Grant "a dear friend", and said of him:

He had a great talent as a writer. Jimmy was a short-story writer. Now a short story writer doesn't have all the voluminous language that dulls a scene. He had to make the dialogue give character to a person and progress the story, and that's practically what Ford as a director did all the time. Ford cut through the nuance and all that crap and got down to the basic story. He put the nuance in with the camera. Jimmy was a writer of the same type ... I knew Jimmy Grant for twenty years. It's very handy to have somebody like that. You know with writers, you don't have enough contact with them.

A chain smoker, Grant died from lung cancer in Burbank, California.

He owned a cattle ranch in Winton in Merced County from the 1940s until his death.

== Awards ==
Grant won the Bronze Wrangler, an annual award presented by the National Cowboy & Western Heritage Museum, twice, for The Alamo in 1961 and The Comancheros the following year. William Bowers and he were nominated for the Academy Award for Best Original Screenplay for The Sheepman in 1959.

== Additional filmography ==
- Big Brown Eyes (1936)
- Great Guy (1936)
- Danger - Love at Work (1937)
- We're Going to Be Rich (1938)
- Josette (1938)
- Miracles for Sale (1939)
- Boom Town (1940)
- Music in My Heart (1940)
- Johnny Eager (1942)
- Incendiary Blonde (1945)
- Angel and the Badman (wrote + Directed) (1947)
- Sands of Iwo Jima (1949)
- Johnny Allegro (story) (1949)
- California Passage (1950)
- Bullfighter and the Lady (1951)
- Flying Leathernecks (1951)
- Big Jim McLain (1952)
- Hondo (1953)
- Trouble Along the Way (uncredited) (1953)
- Ring of Fear (original screenplay + Director) (1954)
- The Last Wagon (1956)
- Good-bye, My Lady (1956)
- Three Violent People (1956)
- The Proud Rebel (1958)
- The Barbarian and the Geisha (uncredited) (1958)
- The Alamo (1960)
- The Comancheros (1961)
- Donovan's Reef (1963)
- McLintock! (1963)
- Circus World (1964)
- Hondo and the Apaches (TV Movie) (earlier screenplay) (1967)
- Hondo – 17 episodes (1967)
- Support Your Local Gunfighter (original story) (1971)
- Angel and the Badman (TV Movie) (story) (Based after the 1947 film) (2009)
