= Swing Out, Sweet Land =

1970 TV special

- Digital release cover
- Genre: Variety; comedy; music
- Written by: Paul Keyes; John Aylesworth
- Directed by: Stan Harris
- Presented by: John Wayne
- Starring: John Wayne; Lucille Ball; Jack Benny; George Burns; Johnny Cash; Bing Crosby; Bob Hope; Dean Martin; William Shatner; Ann-Margret

Production
- Production locations: Burbank, California; Buena Park, California
- Running time: 79 minutes
- Production companies: Yongestreet Productions, Inc.; Batjac Productions; Darcy Advertising Company, Inc.

Original release
- Network: NBC
- Release: November 29, 1970

Swing Out, Sweet Land, also known as John Wayne's Tribute to America in its 2007 digital release, is a 1970 American TV special directed by Stan Harris, written by Paul Keyes and John Aylesworth, and produced by Keyes. It was hosted by John Wayne and aired on NBC on November 29, 1970 with a runtime of 79 minutes. The special looked at the history of American settlement and was Wayne's first TV special.

== Presentation ==
The overall theme is pro-United States patriotism, given a light treatment in a series of often-humorous cameo vignettes.

American history is portrayed by a cast of contemporary stars (and others). Wayne is host, leading a star-studded cast of actors, dancers, humorists and musicians, participating in most of the vignettes. As the United States is formed and expanded, Wayne walks a large map on the floor, which shows the growth of the continental United States.

There is a tongue-in-cheek ("yarn-spinning") treatment in most of the scenes, including a running gag originally offered by Bob Hope, regarding Paul Revere: "How he ever got that horse up on the seventh floor, I'll never know!" A number of jokes and puns were references to popular culture of the late 1960s or other anachronisms, such as George Burns, walking through George Washington's inaugural ball in modern clothes and greeting his friend, Jack Benny.

The last few minutes were inspirational words from Wayne, then the stars join in singing God Bless America.

== Production ==
The special was produced by Yongestreet Productions, Inc. in association with Batjac Productions and Darcy Advertising Company, Inc.

Interiors were filmed at NBC Studios, Burbank, California, some scenes shot before a studio audience. Most location shots were made at and around the Independence Hall and Colonial Village which had been built at Knott's Berry Farm, in Buena Park, California.

== Reception ==
It was the highest rated show of the week it aired.

The special was later released on home video as ''John Wayne's Tribute to America''.

== Cast ==
- John Wayne as Himself
- Ann-Margret as Entertainer at Valley Forge
- Lucille Ball as Statue of Liberty (voice)
- Jack Benny as Man Who Finds Silver Dollar
- Dan Blocker as Native American Who Sells Manhattan
- Roscoe Lee Browne as Frederick Douglass
- George Burns as Himself
- Glen Campbell as Himself
- Johnny Cash as Himself
- Roy Clark as Banjo Player at Andrew Jackson's Inaugural
- Bing Crosby as Mark Twain
- Phyllis Diller as Belva A. Lockwood
- Lorne Greene as George Washington
- Celeste Holm as Nancy Lincoln
- Bob Hope as Himself
- Michael Landon as Peter Minuit
- Dean Martin as Eli Whitney
- Dick Martin as Wilbur Wright
- Ross Martin as Alexander Hamilton
- Ed McMahon as Bartender/Announcer
- Greg Morris as Crispus Attucks
- David Nelson as Union Soldier
- Ricky Nelson as Confederate Soldier
- Hugh O'Brian as Thomas Jefferson
- Dan Rowan as Orville Wright
- William Shatner as John Adams
- Red Skelton as Newspaper Printer
- Tommy Smothers as Newspaper Printer's Assistant
- Leslie Uggams as Saloon Singer
- Patrick Wayne as James Caldwell
- Dennis Weaver as Tom Lincoln

Not all cast members were credited.
