= The Train Robbers =

1973 film by Burt Kennedy

- Theatrical release poster
- Directed by: Burt Kennedy
- Written by: Burt Kennedy
- Produced by: Michael Wayne
- Starring: John Wayne; Ann-Margret; Rod Taylor; Ben Johnson; Christopher George; Bobby Vinton; Jerry Gatlin; Ricardo Montalbán
- Cinematography: William H. Clothier
- Edited by: Frank Santillo
- Music by: Dominic Frontiere
- Production company: Batjac Productions
- Distributed by: Warner Bros.
- Release date: February 7, 1973
- Running time: 92 minutes
- Country: United States
- Language: English
- Box office: $2.6 million (US); 354,121 admissions (France)

The Train Robbers is a 1973 American Western film written and directed by Burt Kennedy and starring John Wayne, Ann-Margret, Rod Taylor, Ben Johnson, and Ricardo Montalbán. Filming took place in Sierra de Órganos National Park in the town of Sombrerete, Mexico. Two brief scenes take place in the square that was used for the final shootout in Butch Cassidy and the Sundance Kid.

Kennedy called the film one of his only "really good" films after Support Your Local Sheriff.

== Plot ==
After the death of her husband, Mrs. Lowe wants to tell the railroad where to find $500,000 in gold her late husband Matt stole during a train robbery, and she wants to clear the family name for her son. Instead, Lane convinces her to retrieve the gold so she can collect the $50,000 reward offered by the railroad for its return. Lane gathers some old friends to assist him in retrieving the gold for a share of the reward. The other original train robbers, though, have gathered a gang to try to get the gold at any cost. As they all journey into Mexico in search of the hidden gold, they are followed closely by an unnamed Pinkerton agent, who is working for Wells Fargo.

After a series of adventures and battles, they return to Texas with the gold, where one final battle occurs. The next day, Lane and his men put Mrs. Lowe on a train to return the gold and tell her she can keep the reward for herself and her son. As they are walking past the end of the train, they meet the Pinkerton agent, who tells them, as the train is pulling out, that Matt Lowe was never married and that the woman claiming to be Mrs. Lowe is really a prostitute named Lilly who fooled them into helping her get the gold for herself. Lane then leads his gang to rob the train as the film ends.

== Cast ==
- John Wayne as Lane
- Ann-Margret as Lilly Lowe
- Rod Taylor as Grady
- Ben Johnson as Jesse
- Christopher George as Calhoun
- Bobby Vinton as Ben Young
- Jerry Gatlin as Sam Turner
- Ricardo Montalbán as the Pinkerton man

== Production ==
Kennedy finished the script in November 1971 and sent it to John Wayne, who agreed to make it. Kennedy wanted to cast Jack Elam, but said John Wayne refused because the actor felt Elam had outshone him in Rio Lobo. Filming started in March 1972. An eight-year-old Mexican boy was hit by one of the cars associated with the film and died.

Kennedy later said, "It had to be the right cast, you know. If you don’t have the right cast, those talky things don’t work. Trek talk. You got to have really a good cast, and you know I had Bobby Vinton and a couple of other people, and dear Annie Margaret. Like Casey Stengel says, you’re only as good as your horses. I didn’t have the horses."

== Reception ==
Roger Ebert of the Chicago Sun-Times gave the film three stars out of four and called it "fairly good, in a quiet and workmanlike sort of way, although there's a plot twist at the end that ruins things unnecessarily. But what’s best about it, what makes it worth seeing, is Kennedy’s visual approach to the subject of John Wayne." Roger Greenspun of The New York Times wrote, "I don't think that tone and attitude are quite enough to sustain a movie, or that an air of good feeling can take the place of meaningful dramatic action. But as an exercise in pleasantness, 'The Train Robbers' is an interesting addition to the late history of the traditional unpretentious Western." Arthur D. Murphy of Variety called it "an above-average John Wayne actioner, written and directed by Burt Kennedy with suspense, comedy and humanism not usually found in the formula." Gene Siskel of the Chicago Tribune gave the film three stars out of four and declared that John Wayne's "legend not only lives in 'The Train Robbers,' it gleams." Kevin Thomas of the Los Angeles Times wrote, "In the light of the current—and largely admirable—cycle of revisionist westerns that lay waste to those cherished myths of the frontier, it's downright reassuring to watch an amiable, traditional-style John Wayne adventure...There's a neat balance between action and comedy, and Wayne himself is in top form."

The film holds a score of 40% on Rotten Tomatoes, based on five reviews.

Kennedy called it a "little success".

== See also ==
- List of American films of 1973
- John Wayne filmography
