= Track of the Cat (film) =

1954 film

- Theatrical release poster
- Directed by: William A. Wellman
- Screenplay by: A. I. Bezzerides
- Based on: the novel The Track of the Cat by Walter Van Tilburg Clark
- Produced by: Robert Fellows; John Wayne
- Starring: Robert Mitchum; Teresa Wright; Diana Lynn
- Cinematography: William H. Clothier
- Edited by: Fred MacDowell
- Music by: Roy Webb
- Color process: Warnercolor
- Production company: Wayne/Fellows Productions
- Distributed by: Warner Bros. Pictures
- Release date: November 19, 1954
- Running time: 102 minutes
- Country: United States
- Language: English
- Box office: $2 million

Track of the Cat is a 1954 American Western film directed by William A. Wellman and starring Robert Mitchum, Teresa Wright and Diana Lynn. The film is based on a 1949 adventure novel of the same name by Walter Van Tilburg Clark. This was Wellman's second adaptation of a Clark novel; the first was The Ox-Bow Incident in 1943. Track of the Cat was produced by John Wayne and Robert Fellows for their production company Wayne/Fellows Productions.

== Plot ==
The squabbling Bridges family spend a harsh winter on their remote ranch in Northern California during the early 1900s. Crude, quarrelsome Curt Bridges bullies his modest, unassuming older brother Arthur, while youngest brother Harold endures Curt's abuse in silence. Their mother is a bigoted religious zealot; their father is a loquacious, self-pitying drunk. Bitter unmarried sister Grace is temporarily gladdened by the arrival of Harold's fiancée, the spirited Gwen. The family's hired Indian hand, Joe Sam, alerts the family to a panther prowling the hills; many years before, his family was wiped out by a panther. Joe Sam's superstitious dread of the cat irritates Curt. He and Arthur set out to track the panther.

As the family tensely await their return, Harold who avoids conflict with his parents, is gently encouraged by Gwen to assert his claim to an equal share of the ranch. Harold refuses, out of respect for Curt, who has successfully run the spread for years now. Although Grace tries to support her youngest brother and his fiancée, Ma Bridges is hatefully suspicious of Gwen, who ignores the family's histrionics calmly for Harold's sake. In the end, Arthur and Curt both die in pursuit of the panther, which is ultimately killed by Harold. The surviving characters seem hopeful that their ordeal may create the basis for a happier future.

== Cast ==
- Robert Mitchum as Curt Bridges
- Teresa Wright as Grace Bridges
- Diana Lynn as Gwen Williams
- Tab Hunter as Harold Bridges
- Beulah Bondi as Ma Bridges
- Philip Tonge as Pa Bridges
- William Hopper as Arthur Bridges
- Carl Switzer as Joe Sam

== Production ==
The outdoor scenes were filmed on Mount Rainier in Washington and Mitchum regarded shooting in the deep snow and cold as the worst filming conditions he had ever experienced.

Director William A. Wellman had always intended to film a black-and-white movie in color. His idea was that if a film were to be shot in mostly monochromatic shades, with stark blacks and whites and otherwise mostly very subdued colors that were almost shades of grey, he could use bright colors very sparingly for intense dramatic effect. William Clothier's cinematography was designed to highlight black and white and downplay colors. Only key elements such as the blue matches, the fire and Mitchum's red coat stand out.

== Reception ==
Writing in The New York Times, critic Bosley Crowther called the film "a sort of Eugene O'Neill-ized Western drama" and provided a mixed review: "... Mr. Wellman's big-screen picture seems a heavy and clumsy travesty of a deep matriarchal melodrama or a Western with Greek overtones. And the business of the brother hunting the panther in the great big CinemaScope outdoors, while the family booze and blather in the ranch-house, has the nature of an entirely different show ... This, in the last analysis, is the trouble with the film: it has no psychological pattern, no dramatic point. There's a lot of pretty snow scenery in it and a lot of talk about deep emotional things. But it gets lost in following some sort of pretense."

Other contemporary reviews were also mixed despite their acclaim for the film's scenery. The Richmond News Leader called it "gloomy" but a review in The Spokesman-Review categorized Track of the Cat as "another psychological puzzler, but easily one of the best of the year."

More recently, film critic Dennis Schwartz wrote positively about the film in 2005: "A brilliantly realized ambitious dark, brooding Western set in the 1880s in northern California on an isolated snowbound ranch. It is based on the book by Walter van Tilburg Clark, one of whose other books, The Ox-Bow Incident, had also been filmed by William Wellman. The scorching literate script is by A.I. Bezzerides. It has the haunting feel of a Poe work and the primitive savageness of Indian folklore. Cinematographer William H. Clothier bleached out the primary colors and that gave the images the look of a black and white film. The haunting luminous look created was very effective in charging the film with the sub-textual sexual energy that lingers from the hot melodramatics and also giving it an alluring aura of mystery."

Jonathan Rosenbaum wrote that it was "one of the strangest films ever to have come out of Hollywood...Wellman designed most of the film in black and white but shot it in color as well as CinemaScope (William H. Clothier’s cinematography is stunning), yielding a drama of the 1880s that alternates between stylized, claustrophobic sets and spacious locations...Bertrand Tavernier has compared it to the work of Dreyer, and it’s certainly the closest that American cinema has ever come to Ordet."
