= Bullfighter and the Lady =

1951 film by Budd Boetticher

- Movie poster
- Directed by: Budd Boetticher
- Screenplay by: James Edward Grant
- Story by: Budd Boetticher; Ray Nazarro
- Produced by: Budd Boetticher; John Wayne
- Starring: Robert Stack; Joy Page; Gilbert Roland
- Cinematography: Jack Draper
- Edited by: Richard L. Van Enger
- Music by: Victor Young
- Production company: John Wayne Productions
- Distributed by: Republic Pictures
- Release date: April 26, 1951 (New York City)
- Running time: 87 minutes 124 minutes (restored)
- Countries: United States; Mexico
- Language: English

Bullfighter and the Lady is a 1951 drama romance sport film directed and written by Budd Boetticher and starring Robert Stack, Joy Page and Gilbert Roland. Filmed on location in Mexico, the film focuses on the dangers of bullfighting. Boetticher, who had experience in bullfighting, used a semidocumentary approach in filming the activity and the lives of matadors.

== Plot ==
Brash, egotistic American film producer Chuck Regan travels to Mexico, where he learns bullfighting to impress Anita de la Vega. Manolo Estrada, an aging matador, reluctantly agrees to teach Chuck.

== Cast ==
- Robert Stack as John "Chuck" Regan
- Joy Page as Anita de la Vega
- Gilbert Roland as Manolo Estrada
- Virginia Grey as Lisbeth Flood
- John Hubbard as Barney Flood
- Katy Jurado as Chelo Estrada
- Ismael Pérez as Panchito
- Rodolfo Acosta as Juan
- Ruben Padilla as Dr. Sierra
- Darío Ramírez as Pepe Mora
- Paul Fix as Joseph Jamison (uncredited)
- Ward Bond as Narrator (voice) (uncredited)

== Production ==
The film's working title was Torero. Boetticher had been a bullfighter and told his life story to Ray Nazarro when working as Nazarro's assistant director at Columbia Pictures. Boetticher claims that Nazarro has a writing credit because he typed the story and sold the project to Dore Schary at MGM.

Boetticher stated that the film was greenlighted because John Wayne liked the story. He said that Wayne "and John Ford cut 42 minutes out of" the film "so that it would be less than 90 minutes, a "B" picture. It took me forty years to get it back the way I wanted it.. It was a helluva blow, I tell you."

For the film's American theatrical release, Bullfighter and the Lady was cut to 87 minutes in order to share a double bill.

== Reception ==
In a contemporary review for The New York Times, critic Bosley Crowther called Bullfighter and the Lady "a blissfully fanciful romance" in contrast with The Brave Bulls, another bullfighting film that had opened in New York the previous week that he described as "the most powerful picture ever fashioned by an American producer on bull-fighting". Crowther likened Robert Stack's character to juvenile sports-fiction hero Frank Merriwell, writing: "As a matter of fact, the performance of Robert Stack in this role is enough to provoke the impression that Frank himself is down there fighting bulls. For Mr. Stack is a fellow with a genuine Merriwell air. He carries his physical magnificence with the bland confidence of a snob, and an ugly or adult expression never besmirches his handsome face. His eyes are clear, his hair is wavy, his nostrils flare like a thoroughbred's and his jaw is as firm as a statue's when there's business or loving to be done."

== Awards ==
Bullfighter earned Boetticher his only Academy Award nomination, for Best Story, which he shared with cowriter Ray Nazarro. Together with Seven Men from Now, Boetticher regarded Bullfighter and the Lady as one of "the two best films I ever made."

== Home video ==
The UCLA Film Archive has restored the film to its full 124-minute length. The complete version of Bullfighter and the Lady was released on DVD and Blu-ray disc on July 30, 2013.
