= Cahill U.S. Marshal =

1973 film by Andrew V. McLaglen

- Theatrical poster
- Directed by: Andrew V. McLaglen
- Written by: Barney Slater (story)
- Screenplay by: Harry Julian Fink; Rita M. Fink
- Produced by: Michael Wayne
- Starring: John Wayne; Gary Grimes; Neville Brand; George Kennedy
- Cinematography: Joseph F. Biroc
- Edited by: Robert L. Simpson
- Music by: Elmer Bernstein
- Production company: Batjac Productions
- Distributed by: Warner Bros.
- Release date: July 11, 1973
- Running time: 103 minutes
- Country: United States
- Language: English
- Box office: $3,100,000 (US/ Canada rentals)

Cahill U.S. Marshal is a 1973 American Western film in Technicolor starring John Wayne as a driven lawman in a black hat. The film was directed by Andrew V. McLaglen and filmed on location in Durango, Mexico. The supporting cast features George Kennedy, Neville Brand, Marie Windsor, Royal Dano, Denver Pyle, Jackie Coogan, Harry Carey Jr., Paul Fix and Hank Worden.

== Plot ==
While J. D. Cahill, a widower and U.S. Marshal, is away from home, his two sons Danny and Billy aid Abe Fraser and his gang to escape temporarily from jail and to rob a bank. The town's sheriff is shot and killed and another townsfolk is knifed and killed during the robbery. Billy hides the stolen money while his brother and the rest of the gang return to their jail cells as an alibi.

When Cahill returns, he and Danny look for the perpetrators with the help of half-Comanche tracker Lightfoot. Cahill arrests four suspects and although they are innocent of the town bank robbery, they are found guilty and scheduled to be hanged. While on the trail of the kids, Cahill and Lightfoot are ambushed by Brownie.

Lightfoot hurts Brownie but is eventually killed. Cahill's sons try to give the gang's share of the money to Fraser, Fraser however wants all the money and prepares to kill them when he is shot by Cahill who used his sons to lure Fraser out into the open. The Cahills reconcile and leave for town to stop the hangings of the initial suspects.

== Cast ==
- John Wayne as U.S. Marshal J. D. Cahill
- George Kennedy as Fraser
- Gary Grimes as Daniel Cahill
- Neville Brand as Lightfoot
- Clay O'Brien as Billy Joe Cahill
- Marie Windsor as Hetty Green
- Morgan Paull as Struther
- Dan Vadis as Brownie
- Royal Dano as MacDonald
- Scott Walker as Ben
- Denver Pyle as Denver
- Jackie Coogan as Charlie Smith
- Rayford Barnes as Simser
- Dan Kemp as Joe Meehan
- Harry Carey Jr. as Hank
- Walter Barnes as Sheriff Grady
- Paul Fix as Old Man
- Pepper Martin as Casey
- Hank Worden as Albert
- James Nusser as Doctor Jones
- Murray MacLeod as Deputy Sheriff Gordine
- Hunter von Leer as Deputy Sheriff Jim Kane

== Production ==
The film was produced by John Wayne's production company Batjac Productions and shot on location in Durango, Mexico.

== Reception ==
In a 1975 interview with writer Tony Macklin for Film Heritage, Wayne said the film had "a good theme" but "wasn't a well-done picture" because it "needed better writing" and "a little more care in the making."

== See also ==
- List of American films of 1973
- John Wayne filmography
