= Caven =

Caven or Cavens may refer to:

== People ==
- Albert Cavens (1906–1985), Belgian-American silent film actor
- Fred Cavens (1882–1962), Belgian-American actor and fencing instructor
- Ingrid Caven (born 1938), German film actress
- Jamie Caven (born 1976), English darts player
- John Caven (disambiguation)
- Jurgen Cavens (born 1978), Belgian footballer
- Peter Caven (born 1970), Australian footballer
- Simone Cavens (died 1971), Belgian-American silent film actress

== In botany ==
- Acacia caven
- Acacia caven var. caven
- Acacia caven var. stenocarpa
- Acacia caven var. microcarpa
- Acacia caven var. dehiscens
