= The Conqueror (1956 film) =

1956 film by Dick Powell

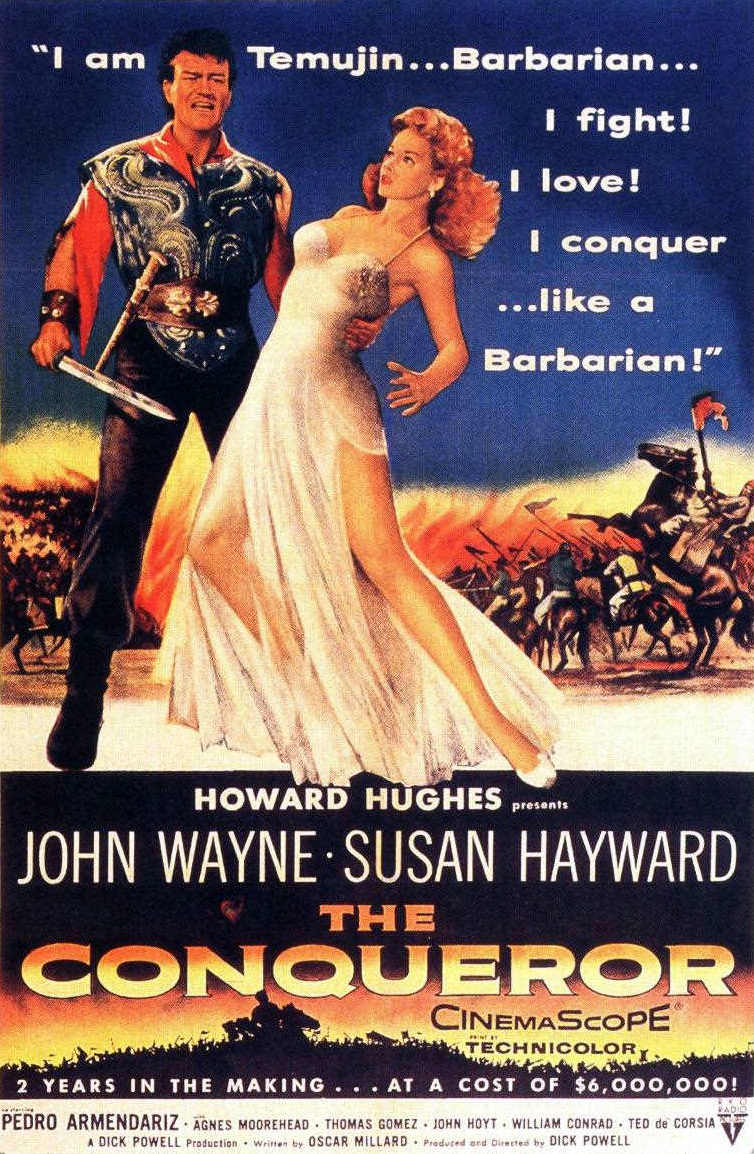
- Theatrical release poster
- Directed by: Dick Powell
- Written by: Oscar Millard
- Produced by: Dick Powell; Howard Hughes (uncredited)
- Starring: John Wayne; Susan Hayward; Pedro Armendáriz; Agnes Moorehead; Thomas Gomez; John Hoyt; William Conrad; Ted de Corsia
- Cinematography: Joseph LaShelle
- Edited by: Stuart Gilmore
- Music by: Victor Young
- Production company: RKO Radio Pictures
- Distributed by: RKO Radio Pictures
- Release dates: February 22, 1956 (Los Angeles); March 28, 1956 (U.S.)
- Running time: 111 minutes
- Country: United States
- Language: English
- Budget: $6 million
- Box office: $9 million

The Conqueror is a 1956 American epic historical adventure film directed and produced by Dick Powell and written by Oscar Millard. It stars John Wayne as the Mongol conqueror Genghis Khan and co-stars Susan Hayward, Agnes Moorehead and Pedro Armendáriz. Co-produced by entrepreneur Howard Hughes, the film was principally shot near St. George, Utah.

Despite the stature of the cast and a respectable box office performance, the film was critically panned; it is often ranked as one of the worst films of the 1950s and also as one of the worst films ever made. Wayne, who was at the height of his career, had lobbied for the lead role after reading the script and was widely believed to have been grossly miscast.

The Conqueror was listed in the 1978 book The Fifty Worst Films of All Time. In 1980, Wayne posthumously received a Golden Turkey Award (awarded to movies and performances considered the worst in history) in the "Worst Casting" category for his performance as Genghis.

In the years since release, the film garnered additional controversy for its filming downwind of a nuclear testing site, which sparked debate among historians and biologists over whether or not it caused multiple cases of cancer among the cast and crew.

== Plot ==
During the 12th century, Mongol chief Temujin (later to be known as Genghis Khan) and his "blood brother" Jamuga stop a traveling caravan escorting Bortai, the daughter of the Tartars' leader Kumlek. Temujin leaves and tells Jamuga he intends to take Bortai for himself, having fallen in love with her. Jamuga tells Temujin that his actions will spark a war, but Temujin attacks and subdues the caravan. Temujin captures and then releases Targutai, the Merkit chieftain.

Bortai is brought to the Mongol camp, where Temujin's mother Hunlun angrily learns about her relation to Kumlek, her husband's murderer. Regardless, Temujin keeps her and later that night, he has Bortai sent to a tent after she refuses to dance for the Mongols. Suddenly, the Mongol camp is attacked by Targutai and his men, whereby Temujin kills him. Temujin takes Bortai outside the camp, and forcefully kisses her.

The next morning, Temujin tells Jamuga about his plans to ally with Wang Khan by claiming the Tartars and Merkits will attack Urga, Wang Khan's walled city. On their way there, Temujin tells Bortai he will be gifting Wang Khan her dowry of furs. Angered, she tries to stab Temujin, but he slaps her in return. The Mongols arrive at Wang Khan's palace, where Temujin confers with Wang Khan about the Tartars' plan of attack. Wang Khan consults his shaman, whereby the "spirits" agree with Temujin.

The next day, Temujin learns of Wang Khan's declining health and leaves the palace with Wang Khan's army to fight Kumlek and the Tartars. Along the way, Temujin is ambushed and injured but he hides in a cave. Having escaped, Jamuga finds Temujin, who informs him the Tartars have captured Bortai. Jamuga surrenders to Kumlek but is freed by Bortai to find Temujin. A day later, Kumlek's army follow Jamuga to the cave and capture Temujin, who suspects Jamuga of betrayal. Temujin is tied to a yoke and brought before Kumlek.

Inside the camp, Bortai frees Temujin, who successfully escapes and returns to the Mongol camp, where Jamuga has been made the new chieftain. Temujin accuses him of treachery, but Jamuga denies it and accompanies Kasar, a Mongol warrior, to Wang Khan's palace. There, they inform him that Temujin's forces will meet Wang Khan by the next full moon. However, the shaman schemes to have Jamuga and Kasar imprisoned in their room. While Jamuga escapes through the window, Kasar is killed. Jamuga flees on horseback, but is captured by Kumlek.

The shaman then visits Temujin at his camp, and advises him to seize Urga. During the siege, the shaman stabs Wang Khan in his bedroom, unaware that Temujin was nearby. Wang Khan reveals the shaman's scheme before dying. Temujin kills the shaman in revenge and unites the Mongols and Khan's armies to war against the Tartars. A battle ensues, in which Temujin's armies defeat the Tartars. Temuijin reunites with Bortai and kills Kumlek.

Jamuga names Temujin with the honorary title "Genghis Khan" and asks to be executed, knowing he will never regain Temujin's trust. Temujin complies with Jamuga's request, and forms the Mongol Empire.

== Cast ==
- John Wayne as Temujin, later Genghis Khan
- Susan Hayward as Bortai
- Agnes Moorehead as Hunlun
- Pedro Armendáriz as Jamuga
- Thomas Gomez as Wang Khan
- John Hoyt as Shaman
- William Conrad as Kasar
- Ted de Corsia as Kumlek
- Leslie Bradley as Targutai
- Lee Van Cleef as Chepei
- Peter Mamakos as Bogurchi
- Leo Gordon as Tatar Captain
- Richard Loo as Keraite Captain-of-the-Guard

Wayne’s sons Michael and Patrick, and Dick Powell's son Norman, appear in uncredited bit parts.

== Production ==
=== Casting ===
The role of Genghis Khan was originally written for Marlon Brando, who initially accepted but later backed out. John Wayne was at the end of a three-picture deal with RKO, and lobbied for the lead role after reading the script. Director Dick Powell tried to discourage Wayne, but relented to the actor's insistence, later recalling "Who am I to turn down John Wayne?" According to his son Norman, Dick Powell accepted directing duties for the money. Wayne went on a crash diet, took Dexedrine tablets four times a day, and was trained in fencing by Fred Cavens.

=== Filming ===
Filming took place on-location in Utah, and at the RKO and Universal studio lots in Hollywood. It was RKO's first film to be shot in CinemaScope and, at a budget of $6 million, was the company's most-expensive film to date. 300 extras from the Shivwits Band of Paiutes were cast as Tartar and Mongol horsemen.

The film had a troubled production; writer Oscar Millard stated that "The company had just missed being wiped out by a flash flood, and Duke [John] Wayne had been drunk for three days. Not that it made much difference; except when a bender bloated him, it was hard to tell. His performance drunk or sober was the way other actors tend to perform if drunk." Pedro Armendáriz was hospitalized for a week after being thrown from a horse.

=== Nuclear incident and cancer controversy ===
Of the 220 crew members, 91 (comprising 41% of the crew) developed cancer by 1980, while 46 (or 21%) died from it. When this was learned, many suspected that filming in Utah and surrounding locations, near nuclear test sites, was to blame. Some victims also believed their habitual tobacco use contributed. The perception of a link between the film's location and subsequent illness remains, not least because many of those involved developed cancer at a younger age than average.

Some filming locations included parts of Utah, such as Snow Canyon, Pine Valley, Leeds, and Harrisburg. Exteriors were shot in the Escalante Desert near St. George, Utah, which is 137 miles (220 km) downwind of the United States government's Nevada National Security Site and received the brunt of nuclear fallout from testing active in this period. In 1953, eleven above-ground nuclear weapons tests occurred at the site as part of Operation Upshot–Knothole. The cast and crew spent many difficult weeks at the site, and producer Howard Hughes later shipped 60 tons of dirt back to Hollywood in order to match the Utah terrain and lend realism to studio reshoots. The filmmakers knew about the nuclear tests, but the federal government had assured residents that the tests posed no hazard to the public health. Over 100 nuclear bombs were detonated in the area from 1951 to 1962.

In 1962, Powell developed lymphoma and died in January 1963. Armendáriz committed suicide in June 1963 after being diagnosed with terminal cancer. Hayward died of brain cancer in 1975. Wayne developed lung cancer in 1964, and eventually died from stomach cancer in 1979. Several of Wayne's and Hayward's relatives visiting the set also had cancer scares. Wayne's son Michael developed skin cancer and Patrick had a benign tumor removed from his breast. Hayward's son, Tim Barker, had a benign tumor removed from his mouth. Moorehead was a nonsmoker, teetotaler and health fanatic, yet died of cancer in April 1974. Her mother Mary maintained that it was working on The Conqueror which ultimately killed Agnes.

Hoyt died of lung cancer in 1991. Van Cleef died from a heart attack in 1989, but his secondary cause of death was listed as throat cancer. Some point to other factors such as the wide use of tobacco for the cancer deaths. Wayne's heavy-smoking habit was blamed for his cancer by Wayne and his wife Pilar Pallete. In a 2001 interview with Larry King, Powell's widow June Allyson stated that the cause of death was lung cancer due to his chain smoking. Hayward's cancer began as a lung tumor identified in March 1972 that later metastasized.

Reportedly, Hughes felt guilty about his decisions regarding production, particularly over the decision to film at a hazardous site. He bought every print for $12 million and kept it out of circulation for many years until Universal Pictures purchased the film from his estate in 1979. The Conqueror, along with Ice Station Zebra, are said to be among the films Hughes watched endlessly during his last years.

Dr. Robert Pendleton, then a professor of biology at the University of Utah, is reported to have stated in 1980, "With these numbers, this case could qualify as an epidemic. The connection between fallout radiation and cancer in individual cases has been practically impossible to prove conclusively. But in a group this size you'd expect only 30-some cancers to develop. With 91 cancer cases, I think the tie-in to their exposure on the set of The Conqueror would hold up in a court of law." Several cast and crew members, as well as relatives of those who died, considered suing the government for negligence, claiming it knew more about the hazards in the area than it let on.

Since the primary cast and crew numbered about 220, and a considerable number of cancer cases would be expected, controversy exists as to whether the actual results are attributable to radiation at the nearby nuclear weapons test site. This statistic does not include the Native American Paiute extras in the film.

== Release ==
The Conqueror had premieres around the world in January 1956 in Caracas, Hong Kong, Manila, Mexico City, Paris, (23) São Paulo and Washington, D.C. (24). It had its UK premiere at the Odeon Marble Arch in London on February 2, 1956, where it grossed $11,000 in its first 6 days. Its premiere in Berlin led to a riot as young fans from East Berlin, which was part of East Germany but was not yet separated from West Berlin by the Berlin Wall, stormed past the DDR Border Troops to see John Wayne. The film had its Los Angeles premiere on February 22 and opened in many other US cities that week, including Chicago, Denver, Philadelphia and San Francisco and finished second at the US box office for the week, including a gross of $71,000 in LA and setting many opening day records.

=== Home media ===
Universal purchased the rights to the film in 1979, and the studio released the film on DVD as part of its Vault Series on June 12, 2012.

Kino Lorber released the film on Blu-ray on February 25, 2025.

== Reception ==
=== Box office ===
The film was the eleventh-highest-grossing film at the box office in the United States and Canada during 1956, earning theatrical rentals of $4.5 million, but was ultimately a financial failure due to the film's high budget.

=== Critical response ===
The critical reception was uniformly negative. A. H. Weiler of The New York Times called the film "an Oriental 'Western'" with a script that "should get a few unintentional laughs." Weiler wrote that John Wayne gave an "elementary" portrayal of Genghis while "constantly being unhorsed by such lines as, 'you are beautiful in your wrath.'"

Variety called the film "a fanciful, colorful tale suggestive of the vivid period with a derring-do dash that pays off", adding, "The marquee value of the John Wayne-Susan Hayward teaming more than offsets any incongruity of the casting."

Edwin Schallert of the Los Angeles Times wrote that the film had "a storming quality about it over-all. Which unfortunately make some of the love scenes seem all but laughable." He added, "Powell deserves much credit for maneuvering the fierce and sensational battle scenes, which are a big highlight when Mongols and Tartars clash."

Harrison's Reports wrote that general audiences "should be more than satisfied" by the "thrilling battle scenes" and "strong romance", but the story "does not come through the screen with any appreciable dramatic force, and the acting is no more than acceptable."

John McCarten of The New Yorker called the film "pure Hollywood moonshine ... You never saw so many horses fall down in your life. Still, even though their tumbling is far superior to the antics of the actors, it presently becomes tiresome." Time magazine wrote that Wayne "portrays the great conqueror as a sort of cross between a square-shootin' sheriff and a Mongolian idiot. The idea is good for a couple of snickers, but after that it never Waynes but it bores."

The Monthly Film Bulletin called it "a rambling and rather ordinary Western-type spectacle ... the weakly contrived narrative is singularly lacking in dramatic tension, and it is difficult to see this Temujin, for all his high-flown cries to heaven to support his destiny, as a potential world-beater or as even an amiable bandit. He is merely John Wayne struggling with an unfortunate piece of casting and with such embarrassingly silly lines as 'I feel this Tartar woman is for me.'"

The Philadelphia Inquirer predicted success for the film: "should be a three bell ringer among the popcorn set....the film is aptly titled and after 111 minutes of gore and intrigue, Wayne sets himself up as Genghis Khan, with Susan Hayward beside him. Screen playwright Oscar Millard and producer-director Dick Powell have done competent work."

Biographer Michael Munn claimed John Wayne said the film taught him, "not to make an ass of yourself trying to play parts you're not suited for."

The film is listed in Golden Raspberry Award founder John Wilson's book The Official Razzie Movie Guide as one of the 100 Most Enjoyably Bad Movies Ever Made.

== Comic book adaptation ==
- Dell Four Color #690 (April 1956)

== See also ==
- John Wayne filmography
- List of American films of 1956
- List of Asian historical drama films
- List of film and television accidents
- List of films considered the worst
- Whitewashing in film

== Works cited ==
- Medved, Harry; Medved, Michael (1984). The Hollywood Hall of Shame: The Most Expensive Flops in Movie History. Angus & Robertson. ISBN 0207149291.
