= Patrick Wayne =

American actor (born 1939)

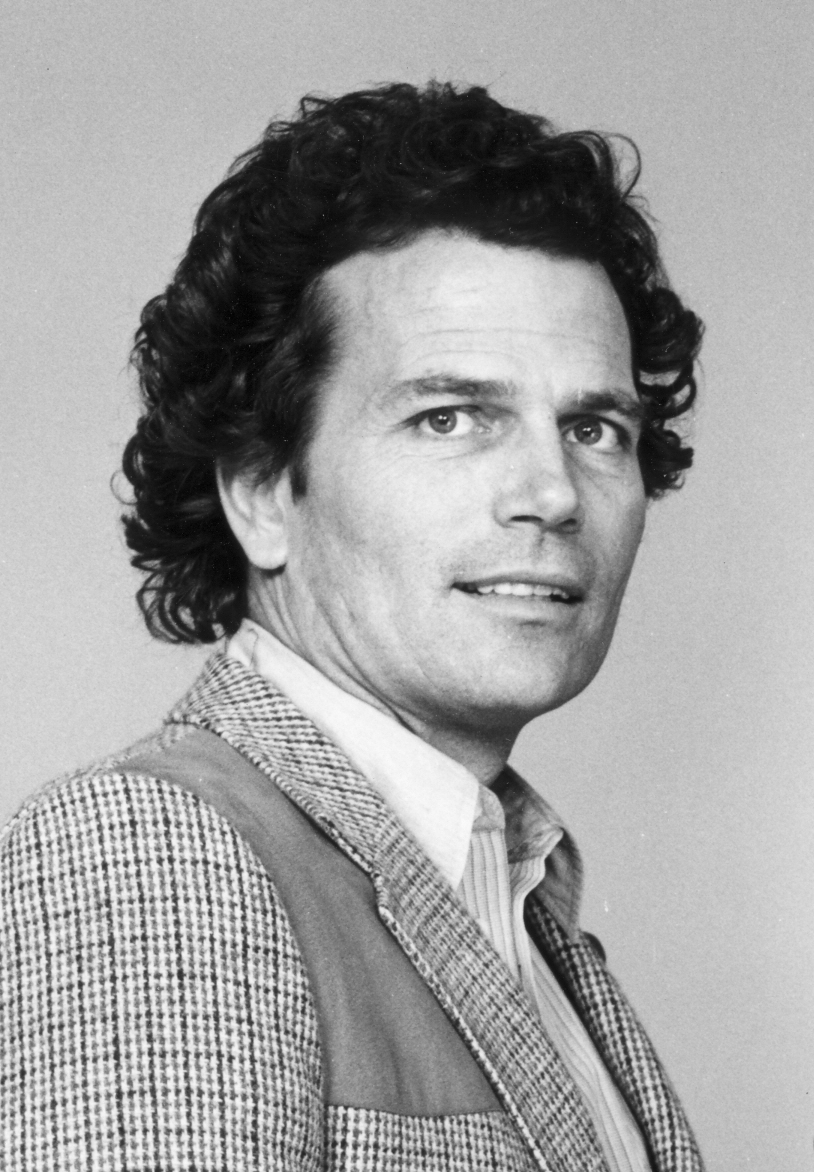
- Wayne in 1981
- Born: Patrick John Morrison; July 15, 1939 (age 87); Los Angeles, California, U.S.
- Other name: Pat Wayne
- Education: Loyola University of Los Angeles
- Occupation: Actor
- Years active: 1950–present
- Organization: John Wayne Cancer Institute
- Spouses: Peggy Hunt (m. 1965; div. 1978) Misha Anderson (m. 1999)
- Children: 3
- Father: John Wayne
- Relatives: Michael Wayne (brother); Pilar Pallete (stepmother); Ethan Wayne (half-brother); Jennifer Wayne (half-niece)

Patrick John Morrison (born July 15, 1939), better known as Patrick Wayne, is an American actor. He is the second son of actor John Wayne.

== Early life ==
Patrick John Morrison (Note: Patrick Wayne's surname at birth was Morrison, as his father's birth name was Marion Robert Morrison.) was born on July 15, 1939, in Los Angeles, California, the second child of John Wayne, an actor, and his first wife, Josephine Alicia (née Saenz), the daughter of Panama's Consul General to the United States. He has three siblings: Michael Wayne, Mary Antonia "Toni" Wayne LaCava, and Melinda Ann Wayne Munoz, and three half-siblings; Aissa Maria Wayne, John Ethan Wayne, and Marisa Carmela Wayne, from his father's marriage to his stepmother, Pilar Pallete, a Peruvian former actress. His godfather was John Ford, a film director.

Wayne attended Loyola University of Los Angeles, where he was a member of the Alpha Delta Gamma fraternity, and graduated in 1961. From 1961 to 1965, he served a tour of duty with the U.S. Coast Guard.

== Career ==
Wayne made his debut at the age of 11, as an uncredited extra in the romantic Western film Rio Grande (1950). He went on to appear in 10 more films with his father, John Wayne: The Quiet Man (1952), The High and the Mighty (1954) – as a props assistant, The Conqueror (1956), The Searchers (1956), The Alamo (1960), The Comancheros (1961), Donovan's Reef (1963), McLintock! (1963), The Green Berets (1968), and Big Jake (1971). He appeared in several films directed by John Ford: The Sun Shines Bright (1952), The Long Gray Line (1955), Mister Roberts (1955), and The Searchers (1956). He struck out on his own to start in his own film The Young Land (1959). He appeared in Ford's sprawling epic Cheyenne Autumn (1964), as James Stewart's son in Shenandoah (1965), in An Eye for an Eye (1966), The Deserter (1971), and in a lead role in The Bears and I (1974) for Walt Disney. His television work included the baseball teleplay Rookie of the Year (1955), directed by Ford and starring his father, and Flashing Spikes (1962), a baseball television anthology installment directed by Ford and starring James Stewart, with his father in an extended cameo role. He played similar roles in both shows as baseball players. He earned recognition in the sci-fi genre following his work on his father's film Big Jake.

Wayne peaked as an actor in the late 1970s in the popular matinee fantasy Sinbad and the Eye of the Tiger (1977), then in The People That Time Forgot (1977). He screen-tested for the title role of Superman. He co-starred as a romantic love interest to Shirley Jones in the brief TV series Shirley (1979). He was the host of The Monte Carlo Show in 1980 and occasionally worked on games shows and syndicated variety series.

Wayne had many appearances on popular television series of the 1970s and 1980s, including Charlie's Angels (1976), Fantasy Island (1978), Murder, She Wrote (1984), Sledge Hammer! (1986), and The Love Boat. He appeared in the movie Young Guns (1988) as Pat Garrett. He also did a comic turn in the Western spoof Rustlers' Rhapsody (1985).

Wayne served as the host of the 1990 revival of the game show Tic-Tac-Dough.

Wayne became chairman of the John Wayne Cancer Institute in 2003. In December 2015, he travelled to Spain to receive the prize Almeria Tierra de Cine in Almeria, Andalucia, for his long career in the cinema, and in his acceptance speech, he noted that his maternal grandparents were born in Madrid and that he is half Spanish.

Wayne appeared on The John Wayne Gritcast podcast series, where he was interviewed by his younger half-brother, Ethan Wayne. The first episode, "Episode 1 – Patrick Wayne – Part 1", was released on September 29, 2021. The second episode, "Episode 2 – Patrick Wayne – Part 2", was released on October 7, 2021. He appeared on the eighth episode, "Episode 8 – McCandles Family Reunion", was released on November 18, 2021. He appeared on the thirteenth episode, "Episode 13 – Family Christmas Episode!", was released on December 23, 2021.

== Personal life ==
Wayne married his first wife, Margaret Ann "Peggy" Hunt, on December 11, 1965. The couple divorced on September 1, 1978 after 12 years of marriage.

Wayne was 39 years old when his father died from stomach cancer on June 11, 1979. His father left an estate worth $6.85M, of which he received $195,000.

Wayne married his second wife Misha Anderson on May 8, 1999.

Wayne has three children. He is the half-uncle of Jennifer Wayne of the country music group Runaway June.

== Filmography ==
=== As an actor ===
Year	Title	Role	Notes
1950	Rio Grande	Boy	Uncredited
1952	The Quiet Man	Boy on Wagon at Horse Race	Uncredited
1953	The Sun Shines Bright	Cadet	Uncredited
1955	The Long Gray Line	Abner 'Cherub' Overton	
1955	Mister Roberts	Bookser	Credited as; Pat Wayne
1955	Screen Directors Playhouse	Lyn Goodhue	Episode: "Rookie of the Year", Credited as; Pat Wayne
1956	The Conqueror		Uncredited
1956	The Searchers	Lt. Greenhill	Credited as; Pat Wayne
1958	Teenage Idol		Television film
1958	Mr. Adams and Eve	Walter	Episode: "Teenage Idol"
1959	The Young Land	Sheriff Jim Ellison	Credited as; Pat Wayne
1960	Have Gun – Will Travel	Ben Huttner	Episode: "Black Sheep", Credited as; Pat Wayne
1960	The Alamo	Capt. James Butler Bonham	
1961	The Comancheros	Tobe	Credited as; Pat Wayne
1962	Alcoa Premiere	Bill Riley	Episode: "Flashing Spikes"
1963	Donovan's Reef	Australian Navy Lieutenant	Uncredited
1963	McLintock!	Devlin Warren	
1964	Cheyenne Autumn	Second Lieut. Scott	
1965	Branded	Cpl. Dewey	Episode: "The Mission: Part 3"
1965	Shenandoah	James Anderson	
1966	Voyage to the Bottom of the Sea	Fraser	Episode: "Killers of the Deep"
1966	12 O'Clock High	Lieutenant Gabriel	Episode: "The Outsider"
1966	An Eye for an Eye	Benny Wallace	Credited as; Pat Wayne
1966–1967	The Rounders	Howdy Lewis	17 episodes
1968, 1972	The F.B.I.	Fred Bruno, Al Linden	2 episodes
1968	The Green Berets	Lt. Jamison	
1968	Rowan & Martin's Laugh-In	Guest Performer	Episode: "Guest Starring Eve Arden"
1970	Sole Survivor	Mac	Television film
1970	Love, American Style	Oliver	Episode: "Love and the Other Guy/Love and Grandma"
1970	Swing Out, Sweet Land	James Caldwell	Uncredited
1970	The Deserter	Capt. Bill Robinson	
1971	Big Jake	James McCandles	
1971	The Gatling Gun	Jim Boland	
1972	Double Play		
1972	Movin' On	Clint Daniels	Television film
1973	Beyond Atlantis	Vic Mathias	
1974	McCloud	Deputy Morris Knowles	Episode: "The Colorado Cattle Caper"
1974	The Bears and I	Bob Leslie	
1974	Marcus Welby, M.D.	Sergeant Buchanan	Episode: "The Outrage"
1974	Police Woman	Kevin Duffy	Episode: "It's Only a Game"
1974	Marathon Bar: Captain Quick	Marathon John	Video
1975	The New Spartans	Bigdick McCracken	
1976	Mustang Country	Tee Jay	
1977	Yesterday's Child	Sanford Grant	Television film
1977	Flight to Holocaust	Les Taggart	Television film
1977	Sinbad and the Eye of the Tiger	Sinbad	
1977	The People That Time Forgot	Ben McBride	
1977	The Last Hurrah	Robert 'Bobby' Skeffington	Television film
1978	Hawaii's Holidays	Roger Powell	Television film
1978	The Life and Times of Grizzly Adams	Brad	Episode: "The Renewal"
1978	Texas Detour	Clay McCarthy	
1978	The Renewal		
1979	Visions of Christmas Past		
1979–1980	Shirley	Lew Armitage	6 episodes
1979, 1981, 1984, 1986, 1989	The Love Boat	Matt Benton, Jack Clayton, Tom Joseph, Jim Stanton, Jeff Peterson, Mike Morel	6 episodes
1980	The Monte Carlo Show	Host	
1981	Charlie's Angels	Steve Walters	Episode: "Waikiki Angels"
1981–1983	Fantasy Island	John Apensdale, Major Wood, Francois	3 episodes
1983	Lottery!	Michael Wainwright	Episode: "Kansas City: Protected Winner"
1984	Matt Houston	Jack Wolcott	Episode: "Cash and Carry"
1985	Rustlers' Rhapsody	Bob Barber	
1985	New Love, American Style		Episode: "Love and the Sauna/Loge and the Night Watchman"
1986	Revenge	Michael Hogan	Video
1987	Sledge Hammer!	Myles	Episode: "Brother, Can You Spare a Crime?"
1987	Danger Bay	Mr. Cormier	Episode: "All the King's Horses"
1987	Murder, She Wrote	Randy Witworth	Episode: "Murder, She Spoke"
1988	Frank's Place	Brandman Carr	Episode: "Frank's Place – The Movie"
1988	Young Guns	Pat Garrett	
1988	Out of This World	Robby Jamison	Episode: "Old Flame"
1988	MacGyver	Jeff Stone	Episode: "Collision Course"
1989	Her Alibi	Gary Blackwood	
1989	Alfred Hitchcock Presents	Michael Roberts	Episode: "South by Southeast"
1989	Chill Factor	Jerry Rivers	
1990	All My Children	Captain Nils Lindstrom	6 episodes
1991	They Came from Outer Space	Lester Kerwick	Episode: "Look Who's Barking"
1995	Kung Fu: The Legend Continues	Garrison	Episode: "Manhunt"
1996	Checkmate	Ray	
1997	High Tide	Earl	Episode: "Two Barretts and a Baby"
1997	Silk Stalkings	Harmon Lange	Episode: "Pumped Up"
1997	Deep Cover	Ray	

=== As himself ===
Year	Title	Notes
1959	The Juke Box Jury	Episode: "Episode dated May 1, 1959"
1960	Spirit of the Alamo	
1962	Here's Hollywood	Episode: "Episode #2.249"
1965	Bandstand	Episode: "Episode #8.46"
1967	Dateline: Hollywood	2 episodes
1968, 1974, 1977, 1979	The Mike Douglas Show	4 episodes
1968	The Woody Woodbury Show	Episode: "Episode dated April 2, 1968"
1971	The Merv Griffin Show	Episode: "Eva Gabor, Patrick Wayne, Henry Darrow, Doug McClure"
1971	The Tonight Show Starring Johnny Carson	Episode: "Episode dated June 4, 1971"
1971	The David Frost Show	Episode: "Episode #3.197"
1974	The Bob Braun Show	Episode: "Episode dated October 8, 1974"
1977, 1979–1980	Good Morning America	3 episodes
1979	Battle of the Network Stars VII	Credited as; Pat Wayne
1979–1980	Hollywood Squares	2 episodes
1979–1980	Whew!	10 episodes
1980	Kraft Salutes Disneyland's 25 Anniversary	
1980–1981	The Monte Carlo Show	24 episodes
1981	The Alan Thicke Show	2 episodes
1981	Password Plus	5 episodes
1984	Hollywood Greats	Episode: "John Wayne"
1984–1985	Body Language	10 episodes
1985	Super Password	5 episodes
1985	All-Star Party for 'Dutch' Reagan	Uncredited
1990	Tic-Tac-Dough	Host
1998	John Wayne and the Searchers	Narrator
2002	The Quiet Man: The Joy of Ireland	
2006	American Masters	Episode: "John Ford/John Wayne: The Filmmaker and the Legend"
2006	50 Films To See Before You Die	
2007	100 Years of John Wayne	
2008	The O'Reilly Factor	Episode: "Episode dated February 18, 2008"
2009	Tournament of Roses Parade	
2010	Machete Maidens Unleashed!	
2011	The Personal Property of John Wayne	
2020	Strength and Courage with Patrick Wayne	
2020	Maureen O'Hara – Banríon Hollywood	
2023	Downwind	
2023	The Conqueror: Hollywood Fallout	

== Notes ==
Media offices
Preceded by Jim Caldwell	Host of Tic Tac Dough; 1990–1991	Succeeded by Brooke Burns
