= Ethan Wayne =

American actor and stuntman (born 1962)

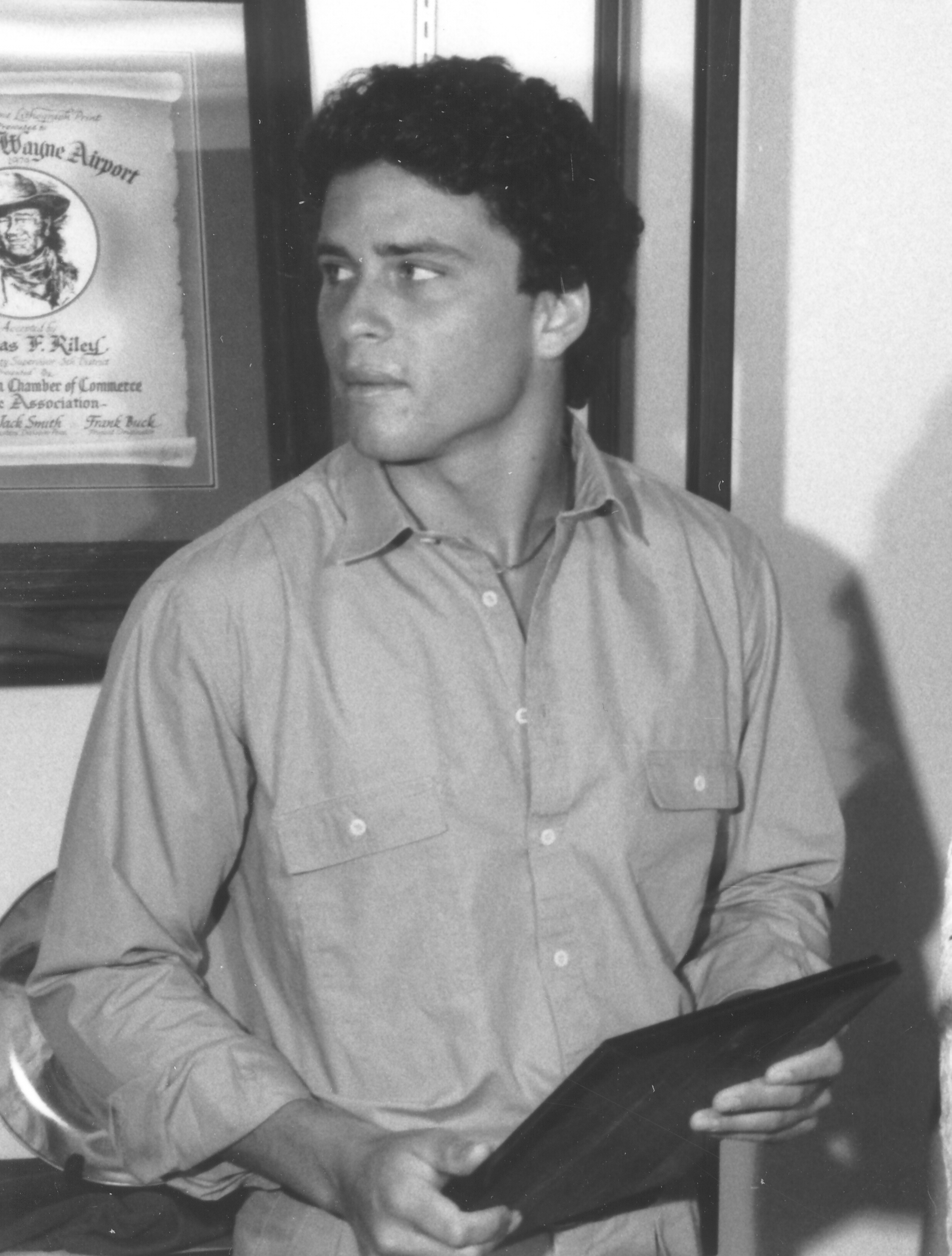
- Wayne at John Wayne Airport, 1980
- Born: John Ethan Morrison; February 22, 1962 (age 64); Los Angeles, California, U.S.
- Occupations: Actor, stuntman, podcast host
- Years active: 1970–present
- Organizations: John Wayne Enterprises; John Wayne Cancer Foundation
- Known for: Role of Storm Logan in The Bold and the Beautiful (1987–1989, 1994, 1998, 2000−2001, 2003)
- Spouse: Gina Rivadenegry (m. 1989; div. 1990)
- Parents: John Wayne (father); Pilar Pallete (mother)
- Relatives: Michael Wayne (half-brother); Patrick Wayne (half-brother); Jennifer Wayne (niece)

Signature
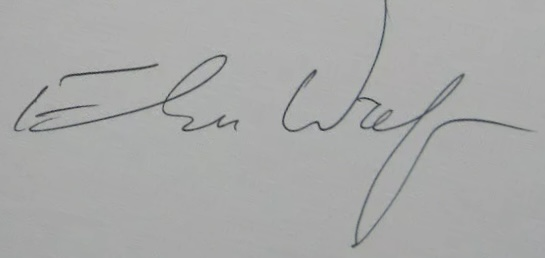

John Ethan Morrison (born February 22, 1962), better known as Ethan Wayne, is an American actor, stuntman and podcast host. He is the youngest son of John Wayne and only son of Pilar Pallete, and is best known for his role as Storm Logan in the CBS soap opera The Bold and the Beautiful (1987–1989, 1994, 1998, 2000−2001, 2003).

== Early life ==
John Ethan Morrison (Note: Ethan Wayne's surname at birth was Morrison, as his father's birth name was Marion Robert Morrison.) was born on February 22, 1962, in Los Angeles, California, the middle child and only son to John Wayne, an American actor, and his third wife, Pilar Pallete, a Peruvian former actress. He has two sisters, Aissa Maria Wayne and Marissa Carmela Wayne, and four half-siblings: Michael Wayne, Mary Antonia "Toni" Wayne LaCava, Patrick Wayne, and Melinda Ann Wayne Munoz, from his father's first marriage to Josephine Alicia Saenz.

Wayne grew up in Newport Beach, California. His name was chosen in direct relation to Ethan Edwards, his father's character in The Searchers. He was 17-years-old when his father died from stomach cancer on June 11, 1979. His father left an estate worth US$6.85M, of which he received US$85,000.

== Career ==
Wayne made his debut in 1970, as a child actor, with an uncredited role in the Western film Rio Lobo. He made his credited film debut with the role of Little Jake McCandles, the grandson of his father's title character in the Technicolor Western film Big Jake (1971). At the start of his career, he was occasionally credited as John Ethan Wayne.

Wayne started doing stunt work in 1979, following the death of his father. His debut was the [musical action comedy film The Blues Brothers (1980). He then resumed work as an actor. His next two major appearances were both in 1981, as Stan in the slasher film Scream, and as Eddie in the comedy film Longshot.

Wayne portrayed Stephen "Storm" Logan Jr. in the CBS soap opera The Bold and the Beautiful, making his debut appearance in the episode broadcast on March 24, 1987. His character was written out of the programme in the episode broadcast on March 10, 1989, after his contract ran out. He returned briefly in September 1994, making his departure that October. He returned in the episode broadcast on New Year's Eve 1997, making his departure in the episode broadcast on January 7, 1998. He made a brief return in January 2001. He made his return in the episode broadcast on April 30, 2003, making his departure in the episode broadcast on May 8. On the soap opera, Wayne worked with Robert Mitchum's granddaughter, Carrie Mitchum, whom he first met on the set of Big Jake.

Wayne received a lot of work overseas after he started to appear on The Bold and the Beautiful.

Wayne portrayed Officer Matt Doyle in the police procedural crime drama series The New Adam-12 during the early 1990s.

Wayne appeared as an expert on the History Channel reality television series Pawn Stars in 2013, during the episode "Dog Day Afternoon", to help authenticate merchandise supposedly related to his father's career.

In celebration of what would have been his father's 111th birthday on May 26, HDNet Movies tapped Wayne to host a "Western Icons" event from May 18–28 which featured films starring his father, Gary Cooper, Clint Eastwood, Gregory Peck, Sidney Poitier, Randolph Scott, and others.

Wayne now manages John Wayne Enterprises. He serves as the director of the John Wayne Cancer Foundation and created its Team DUKE fundraising programme.

Wayne is the host of The John Wayne Gritcast podcast series.

== Personal life ==
Wayne keeps his personal life mostly private. He is the uncle of Jennifer Wayne, from the country music group Runaway June.

Wayne and his longtime girlfriend, Gina Rivadenegry, a flight attendant, eloped in Phoenix, Arizona, in December 1989. The couple quickly separated and their divorce was finalized in 1990, after less than a year of marriage.

== Filmography ==
=== As an actor ===
==== Film ====
Year	Title	Role	Notes
1970	Rio Lobo	Boy Extra	Uncredited
1971	Big Jake	Little Jake McCandles	Credited as John Ethan Wayne
1981	Scream	Stan	
1981	Longshot	Eddie	
1983	Escape from El Diablo	Sundance	Credited as John Ethan Wayne
1985	Man Hunt	Stranger	Credited as John Ethan Wayne
1986	Operation Nam	Mike	
1987	The Alamo: 13 Days to Glory	Edward Taylor	Television film
1996	La signora della città	Harrison Scott	Television film
1997	Bombshell	Cop No. 4	
1997	The Last Embrace	Webster	
1998	Ma il buon Dio è proprio in gamba?	Gary Clemons	
2000	Comanche	Mark Kellogg	Short film

==== Television ====
Year	Title	Role	Notes
1981	B. J. and the Bear	Eric Jeffers	Episode: "S.T.U.N.T."
1984	Knight Rider	Danny Duvall	Episode: "Speed Demons"
1985	The Best Times	Bodie Oates	Episode: "Volleyball"
1987–1989, 1994, 1997–1998, 2000, 2001, 2003	The Bold and the Beautiful	Storm Logan	217 episodes
1989	Jesse Hawkes	—N/a	Episode: "The Centurians"
1990–1991	The New Adam-12	Officer Matt Doyle	47 episodes
1992	Piazza di Spagna	Arnaldo	3 episodes
1993	Missione d'amore	Giorgio	3 episodes
1994	Más allá del horizonte	Juan Pedraza	3 episodes
1997	Suddenly Susan	Dr. Byron Glaser	Episode: "The Me Nobody Nose"

=== As himself ===
Year	Title	Notes
1970	Plimton! Shoot-Out at Rio Lobo	
1984	Hollywood Greats	Episode: "John Wayne"
1987	The $25,000 Pyramid	5 episodes
1987	The $10,000 Pyramid	5 episodes
1997	John Wayne: On Board with the Duke	
2007	100 Years of John Wayne	
2011	The Duke at Fox	
2011	The Personal Property of John Wayne	
2013	Pawn Stars	Episode: "Dog Day Afternoon"
2014	CBS Mornings	Episode: "Episode dated 10 July 2014"
2015	Home & Family	Episode: "Dash Mihok/Ethan & Marisa Wayne"
2016	The Cowboy	2 episodes
2018	To Tell the Truth	Episode: "Ashley Graham/Jenna Elfman/Donald Faison/Alex Trebek"
2021	Big Jake's 50th Anniversary Panel	
2023	John Wayne: Cowboys & Demons	
2023	Red Steagall Is Somewhere West of Wall Street	

=== As a stuntman ===
Year	Title	Notes
1980	The Blues Brothers	
1985	The Return of the Living Dead	
1999	Baby Geniuses	
2011	Red State	
