= Michael Wayne =

American actor and film producer (1934–2003)

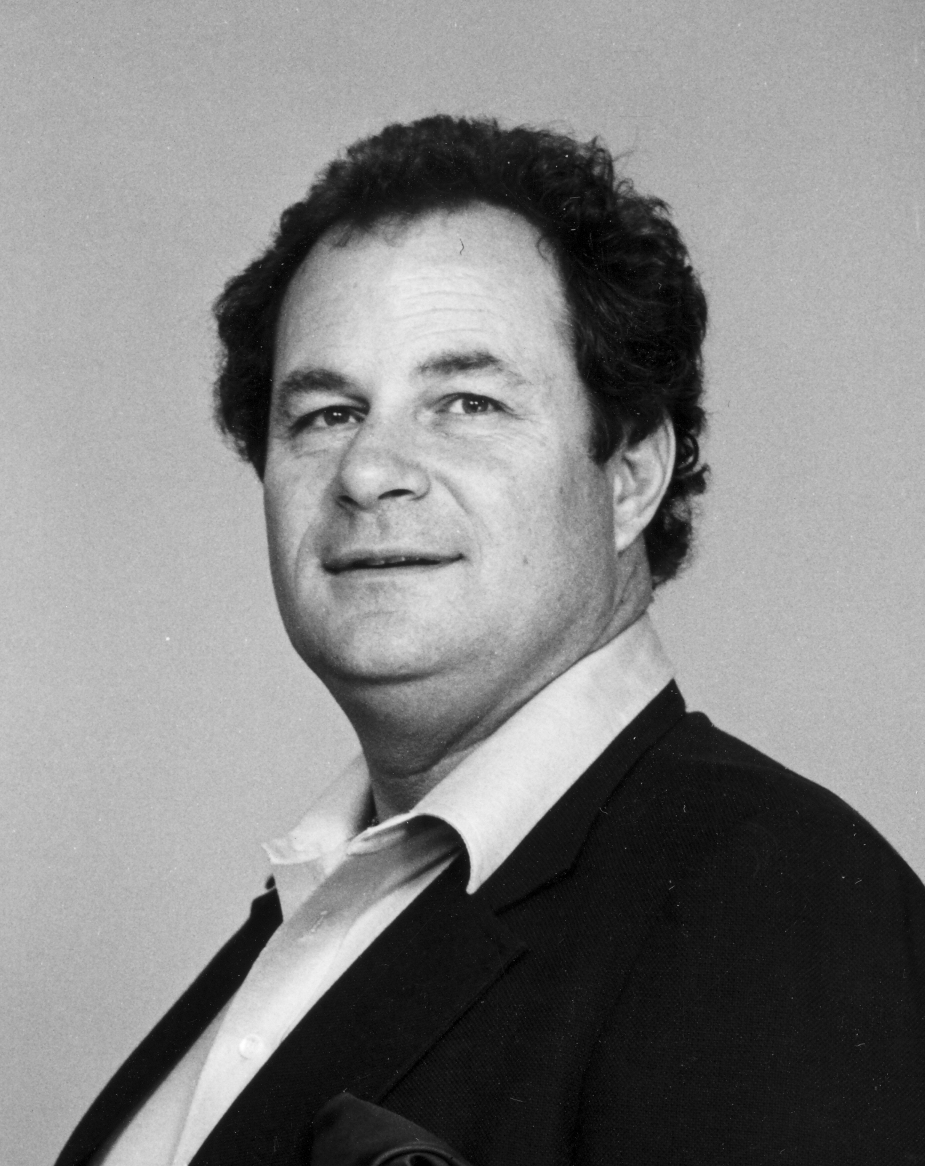
- Wayne in 1981
- Born: Michael Anthony Morrison; November 23, 1934; Los Angeles, California, U.S.
- Died: April 2, 2003 (aged 68); Burbank, California, U.S.
- Resting place: Forest Lawn Memorial Park, Hollywood Hills, Los Angeles
- Education: Loyola University of Los Angeles
- Occupations: Actor, film producer
- Years active: 1941; 1951–1999
- Spouse: Gretchen Deibel (m. 1958)
- Children: 5
- Father: John Wayne
- Relatives: Patrick Wayne (brother); Pilar Pallete (stepmother); Ethan Wayne (half-brother); Jennifer Wayne (half-niece)

Signature
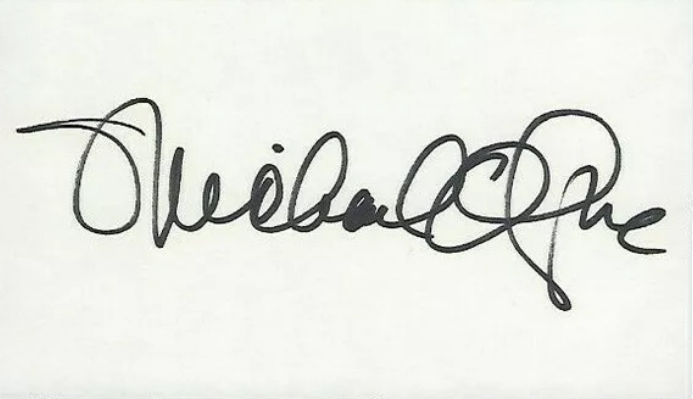

Michael Anthony Morrison (November 23, 1934 – April 2, 2003), known professionally as Michael Wayne, was an American actor and film producer, best known as the eldest son of actor John Wayne.

== Early life ==
Michael Anthony Morrison (Note: Michael Wayne's surname at birth was Morrison, as his father's birth name was Marion Robert Morrison.) was born on November 23, 1934, in Los Angeles, California, the eldest child to John Wayne, an actor, and his first wife, Josephine Alicia (née Saenz), the daughter of Panama's Consul General to the United States. He had three younger siblings: Mary Antonia "Toni" Wayne LaCava, Patrick Wayne, and Melinda Ann Wayne Munoz, and three half-siblings: Aissa Maria Wayne, John Ethan Wayne, and Marisa Carmela Wayne, from his father's marriage to his stepmother, Pilar Pallete, a Peruvian former actress.

Wayne graduated from Loyola University of Los Angeles in 1956, with a business degree. He later served in the U.S. Air Force Reserve.

== Career ==
Wayne began his film career as a production assistant on the set of the John Ford romantic comedy drama film The Quiet Man in 1951. He adopted his father's stage surname, Wayne. He joined his father's film production company, Batjac Productions, for The Alamo (1960). He became the line producer for McLintock! (1963) and producer on many other John Wayne vehicles, including Big Jake (1971) and Cahill U.S. Marshal (1973).

Wayne served on the board of the Motion Picture & Television Fund. He was The John Wayne Foundation's president and chairman of the board. He was also the founder and chairman of the board of the John Wayne Cancer Institute at Saint John's Health Center.

== Personal life ==
Wayne married Gretchen Ann Deibel in Los Angeles, California, on August 30, 1958. They had five children together: Alicia Maria Wayne (born 1959), Teresa Ann Wayne (born 1960), Maria Utilla Wayne (born 1962), Josephine Michele Wayne (born 1965), and Christopher Michael Wayne (born 1967). His sister-in-law, Kathryn Deibel, married Frankie Avalon on January 19, 1963, and they had eight children together. He was the half-uncle of Jennifer Wayne from the country music group Runaway June.

Wayne was 44 years old when his father died from stomach cancer on June 11, 1979. His father left an estate worth $6.85 million (equivalent to $30.39 million in 2025), of which he received $220,000 (equivalent to $976,000 in 2025).

Wayne died at age 68 from heart failure with complications resulting from lupus erythematosus in Burbank, California, on April 2, 2003. He was interred at Forest Lawn Memorial Park, Hollywood Hills, Los Angeles.

== Filmography ==
=== As himself ===
Year	Title	Notes
1941	Meet the Stars #3: Variety Reel #1	
1959	You Bet Your Life	Episode: "Episode #9.15"
1977	Johnny, weil Du Geburtstag hast	
1984	Hollywood Greats	Episode: "John Wayne"
1992	The Making of 'The Quiet Man'	
1992	John Wayne's 'The Alamo'	
1993	Entertainment Tonight	Episode: "Episode dated April 11, 1993"
1993	12th Annual Golden Boot Awards	
1993	The Making of 'Sands of Iwo Jima'	
1995	Wild Bill: A Hollywood Maverick	
1996	John Wayne Appears in a Coors Light Commercial: Behind the Scenes	
1999	E! True Hollywood Story	Episode: "James Bacon: Hollywood Confidential"

=== As an actor ===
Year	Title	Role	Notes
1952	The Quiet Man	Teenage Boy at Races	Uncredited
1956	The Conqueror	Mongol Guard	Uncredited
1968	Rowan & Martin's Laugh-In	Guest Performer	Episode: "Guest Starring Abbe Lane"
1984	Alley Cat	Scarface	
1989	Rapid Fire	Eddy Williams	
1990	The Lost Platoon	Hayden	

=== As a producer ===
Year	Title	Role	Notes
1959	Escort West	Executive producer	Uncredited
1960	The Alamo	Associate producer	Uncredited
1963	McLintock!	Producer	
1966	Cast a Giant Shadow	Co-producer	
1967	The War Wagon	Producer	Uncredited
1968	The Green Berets	Producer	
1970	Chisum	Executive producer	Credited as; Michael A. Wayne
1971	Big Jake	Producer	Credited as; Michael A. Wayne
1973	The Train Robbers	Producer	
1973	Cahill U.S. Marshal	Producer	Credited as; Michael A. Wayne
1974	McQ	Executive producer	
1975	Brannigan	Executive producer	
1978	John Wayne for Great Western Savings	Producer	Short
