= Maureen O'Hara filmography =

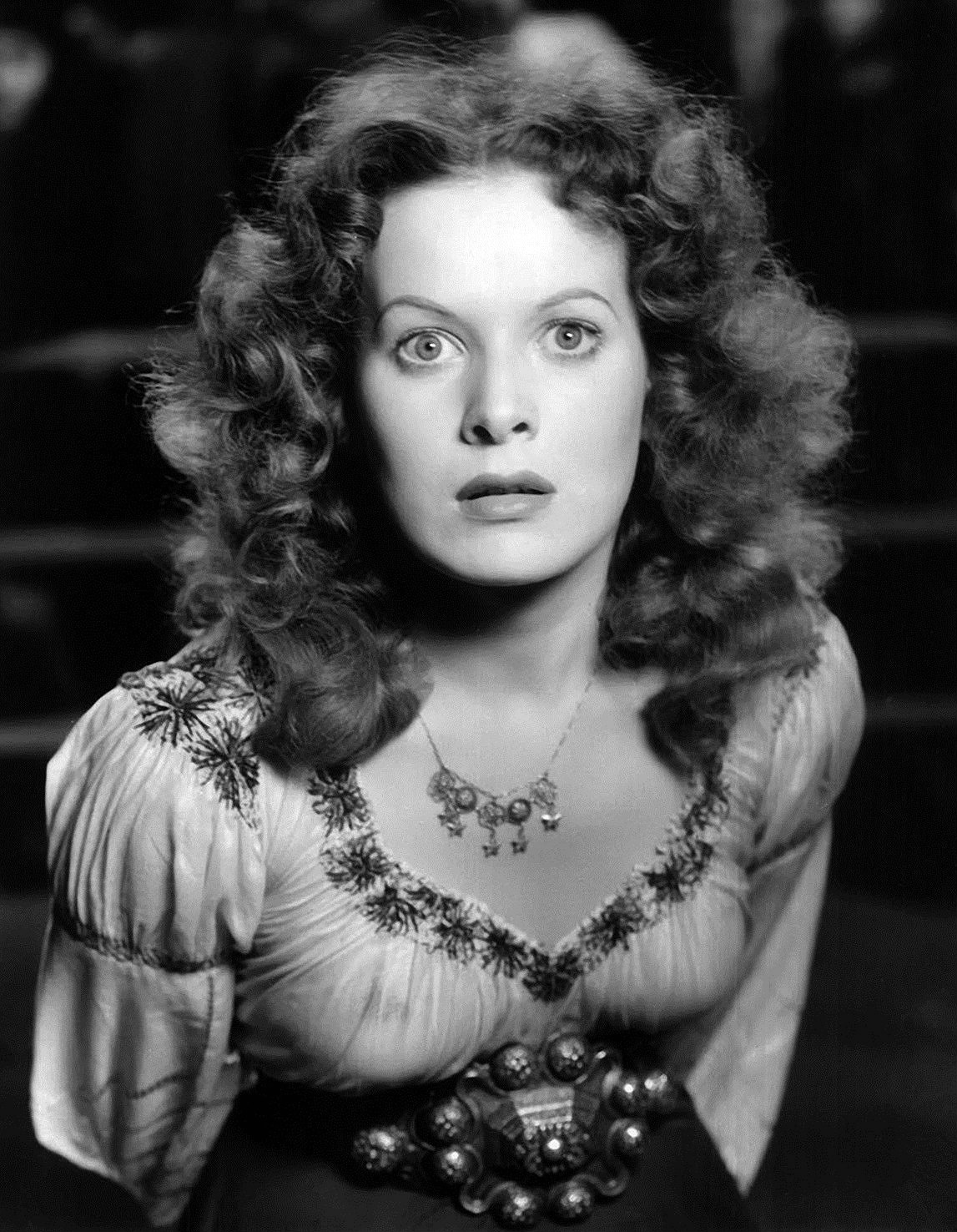
Maureen O'Hara as Esmeralda in the first sound version of The Hunchback of Notre Dame (1939)

Maureen O'Hara (1920–2015) was an Irish singer and actress from Dublin, who worked primarily in American film and television. She was born into a close-knit and artistically talented family; her mother was a contralto vocalist, and her three sisters and two brothers were budding actors and musical performers. O'Hara received music and dance lessons at the Ena Burke School of Elocution and Drama, becoming a member of the Rathmines Theatre Company when she was 10 years old. While still a teenager, she won several Radio Éireann Players contests to perform with them. She also won the Dublin Feis Award, for her performance as Portia in The Merchant of Venice. O’Hara was a member of the Abbey Theatre School, and a graduate of the Guildhall School of Music.

O'Hara's entry into films was the result of her and her parents meeting actor Harry Richman, who offered her a one-line part in the British comedy film Kicking the Moon Around (1938). Within the next year she had made a screen test, following which, actor Charles Laughton cast her in the role of Esmeralda in the first sound version of The Hunchback of Notre Dame (1939) for RKO Pictures. Laughton and O'Hara would work together again in Jamaica Inn (1939) for the British-based Mayflower Pictures, and again at RKO for This Land Is Mine (1943).

Following Jamaica Inn, O'Hara's career floundered at RKO Pictures. Her agent Lew Wasserman got her the role of Angharad Morgan in the 20th Century Fox film adaptation of How Green Was My Valley (1941), directed by John Ford. The film won Academy Awards for Best Picture, Best Director, Best Black-and-White Cinematography, Best Black-and-White Art Direction, and Best Supporting Actor Donald Cook. The effect it had on O'Hara's career was to jumpstart her in a new direction.

From that point forward, O'Hara became an audience favorite, working with some of the most successful actors in the industry. She and John Payne co-starred in To the Shores of Tripoli (1942), Miracle on 34th Street (1947), Tripoli (1950) and Sentimental Journey (1958). Tyrone Power and she teamed up for The Black Swan (1942) and The Long Gray Line (1955). Anthony Quinn first appeared as a non-lead actor in her films The Black Swan (1942), Buffalo Bill (1944), Sinbad the Sailor (1947) and Against All Flags (1952). Quinn soon began to rise in his own career, and he and O'Hara were on equal co-star billing in The Magnificent Matador (1955). Her last film with him was Only the Lonely (1991). She also worked twice with Henry Fonda in Immortal Sergeant (1943) and Spencer's Mountain (1963). O'Hara and Brian Keith co-starred in The Deadly Companions (1961), and The Rare Breed (1966). Their film The Parent Trap (1961) grossed $29,650,385 (equivalent to $294,223,051 in 2025) worldwide, more than any of her other films.

Her association with Ford ultimately led to her collaborations with John Wayne, the co-star who was most linked to her in the public's perception. Together they made Rio Grande (1950), The Quiet Man (1952), The Wings of Eagles (1957), McLintock! (1963) and Big Jake (1971). The Quiet Man was her personal favorite of her entire career, and one she often referred to as "lightning in a bottle". Both the public and Wayne's children saw an on-screen rapport between them that existed with no other co-stars for either of them. The two became so identified with each other that some of the public came to mistakenly believe she and Wayne were actually married in real life. In 1976, she was a participant in the Variety Clubs International All-Star Tribute to John Wayne. On May 21, 1979, O'Hara was summoned by United States Senator Barry Goldwater to speak before a congressional committee in advance of the Congressional Gold Medal being bestowed on Wayne, who was less than a month away from his death from cancer.

With the growing television market in the 1950s and 1960s, O'Hara appeared as a guest star on numerous shows, and received a star on the Hollywood Walk of Fame on February 8, 1960. O'Hara never won an Academy Award for any individual performance, and was not even nominated as such. She was finally given an Honorary Oscar in 2014, when she was 94 years old.

She attained US citizenship in 1946. O'Hara gradually left show business after her 1968 marriage to Charles F. Blair Jr., retired US Air Force brigadier general, former chief pilot at Pan Am and founder of the United States Virgin Islands airline Antilles Air Boats. They are buried together in Arlington National Cemetery.

== Film ==
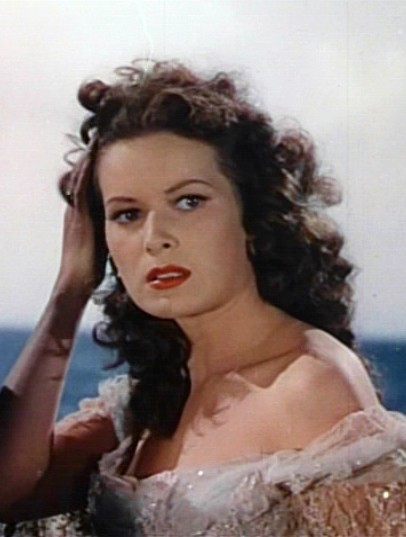
Maureen O'Hara from The Black Swan (1942)

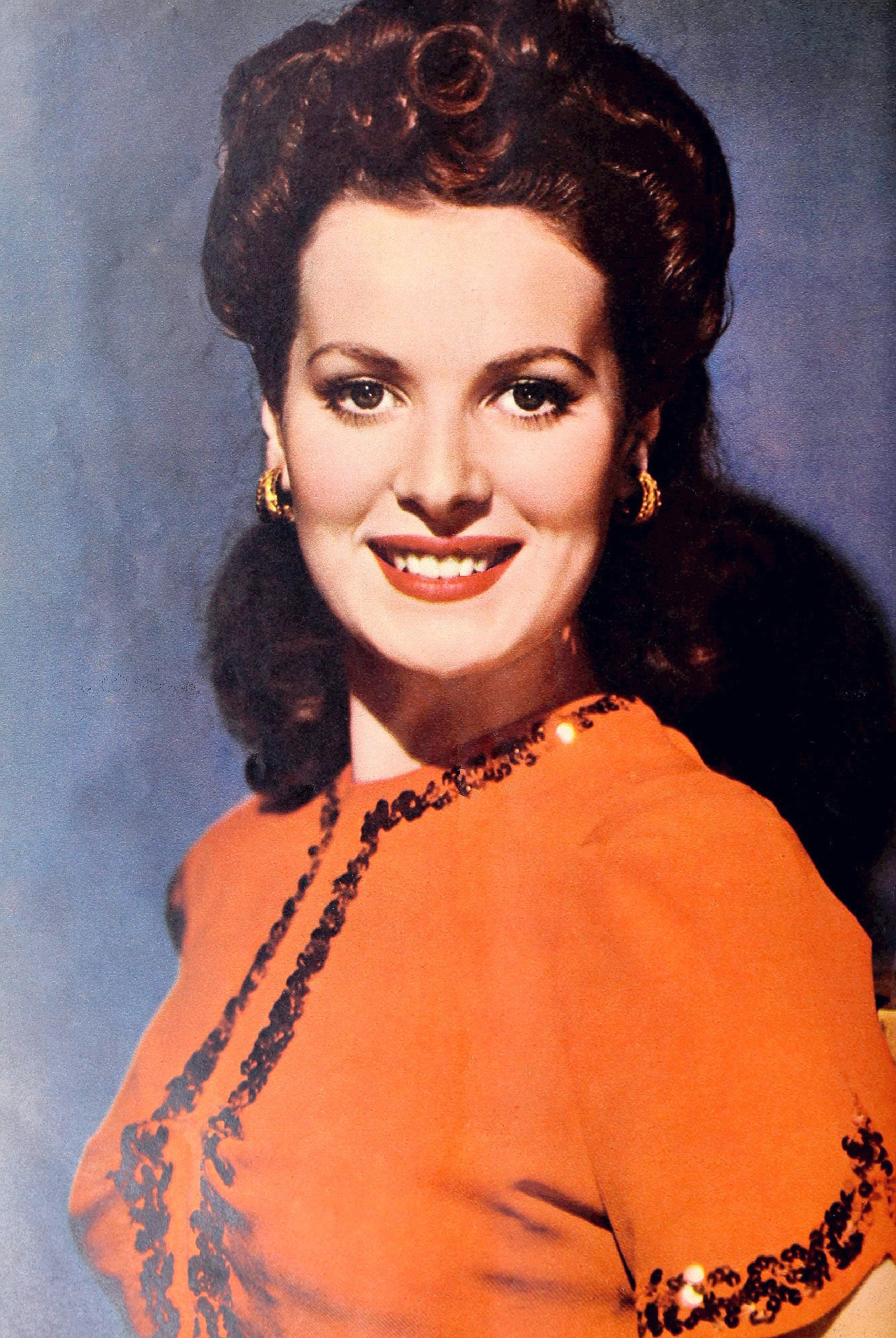
Maureen O'Hara from Photoplay magazine (1942)

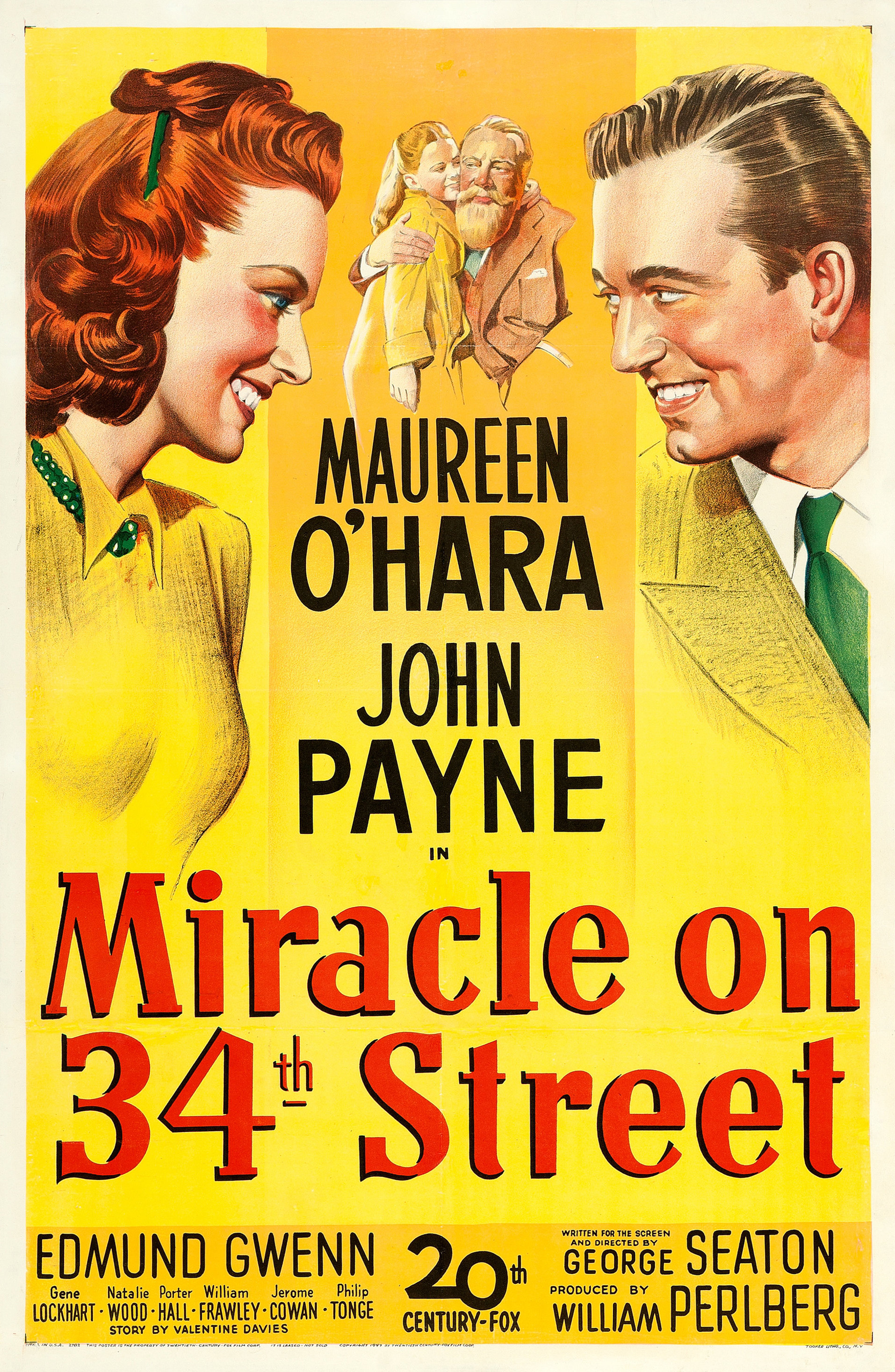
One-sheet poster for Miracle on 34th Street – Maureen O'Hara and John Payne in the foreground, Natalie Wood and Edmund Gwenn in background (1947)

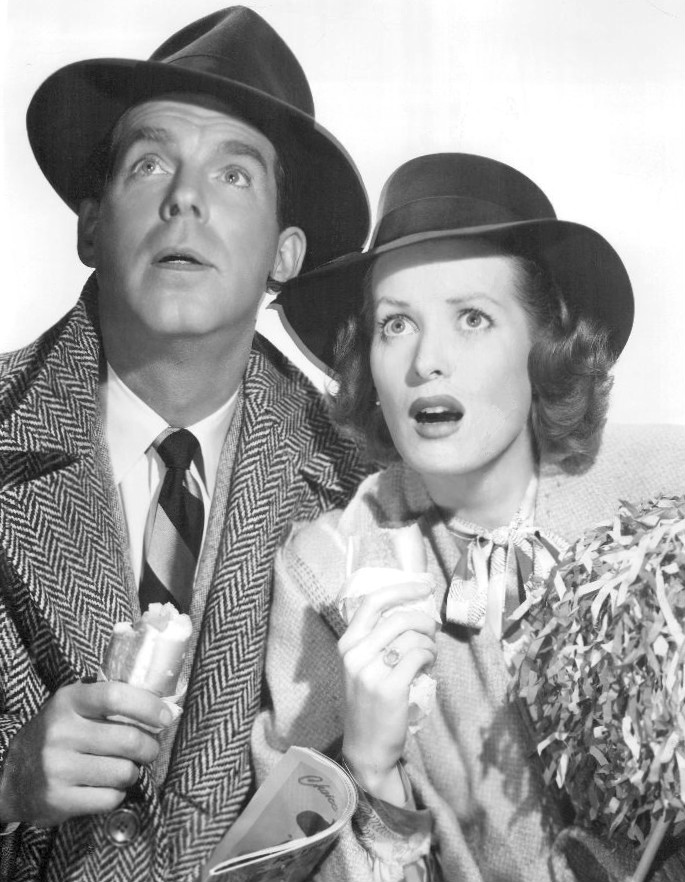
Fred MacMurray and Maureen O'Hara in Father Was a Fullback (1949)

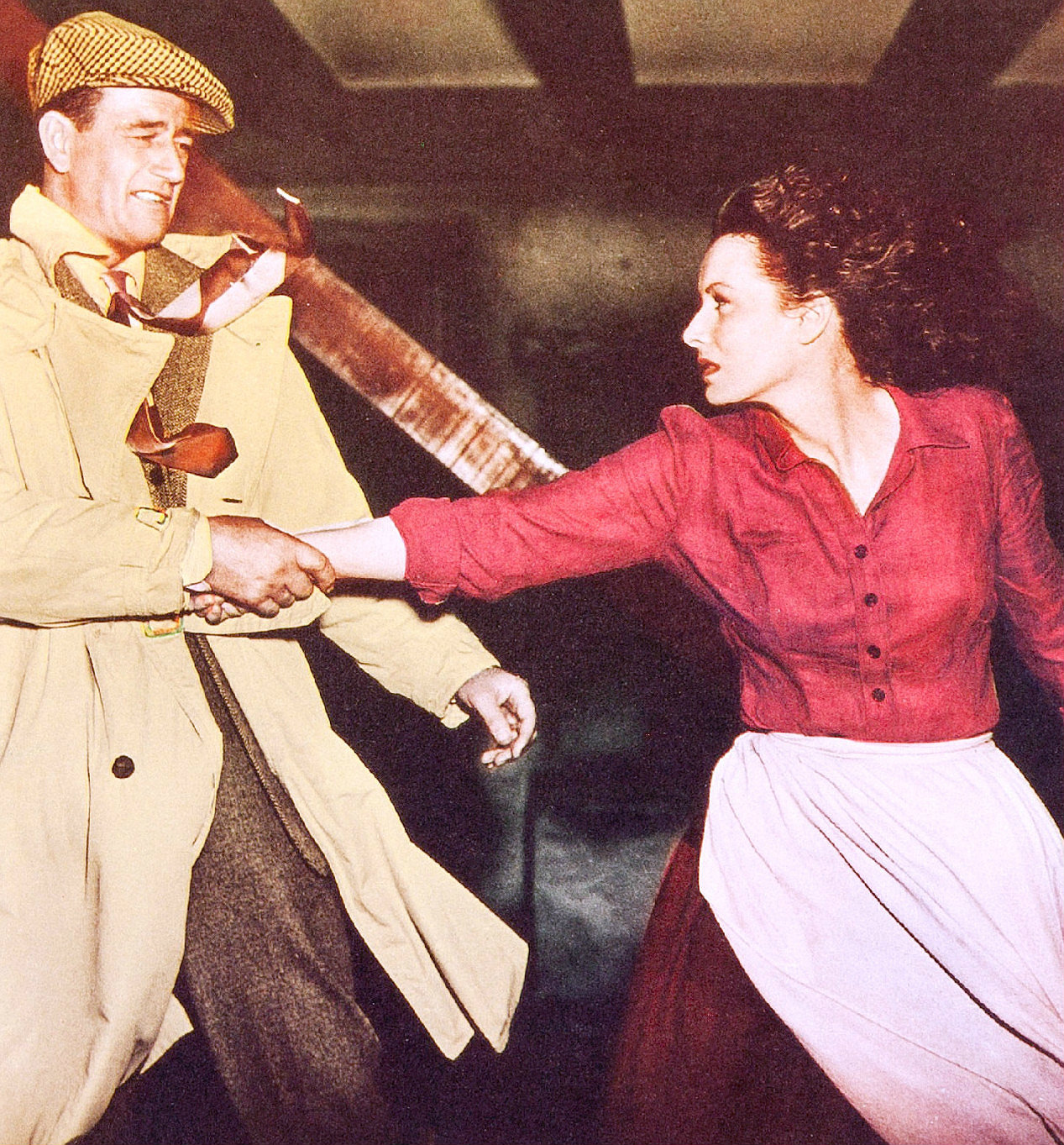
John Wayne and Maureen O'Hara in The Quiet Man (1952)

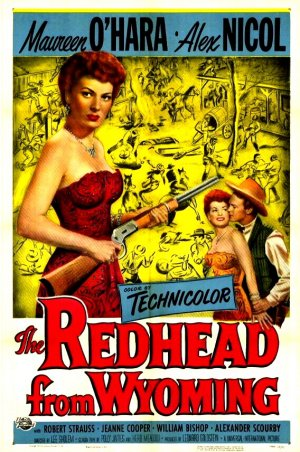
One-sheet poster from The Redhead from Wyoming (1953)

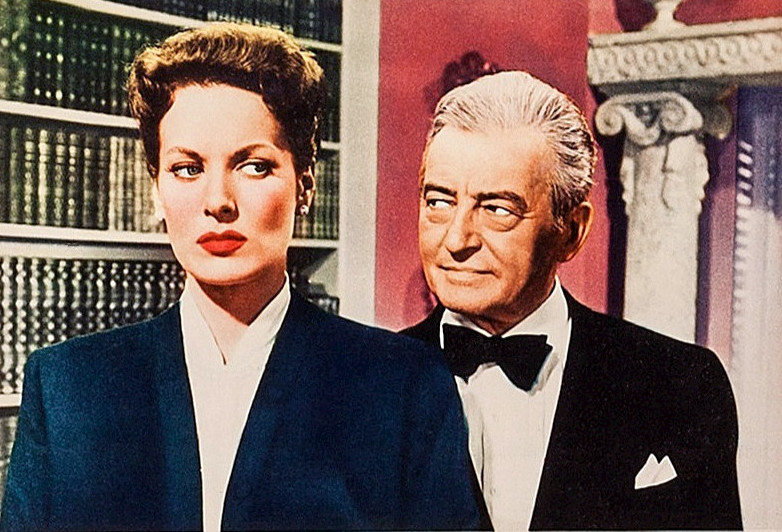
O'Hara and Claude Rains, lobby poster for Lisbon (1956)

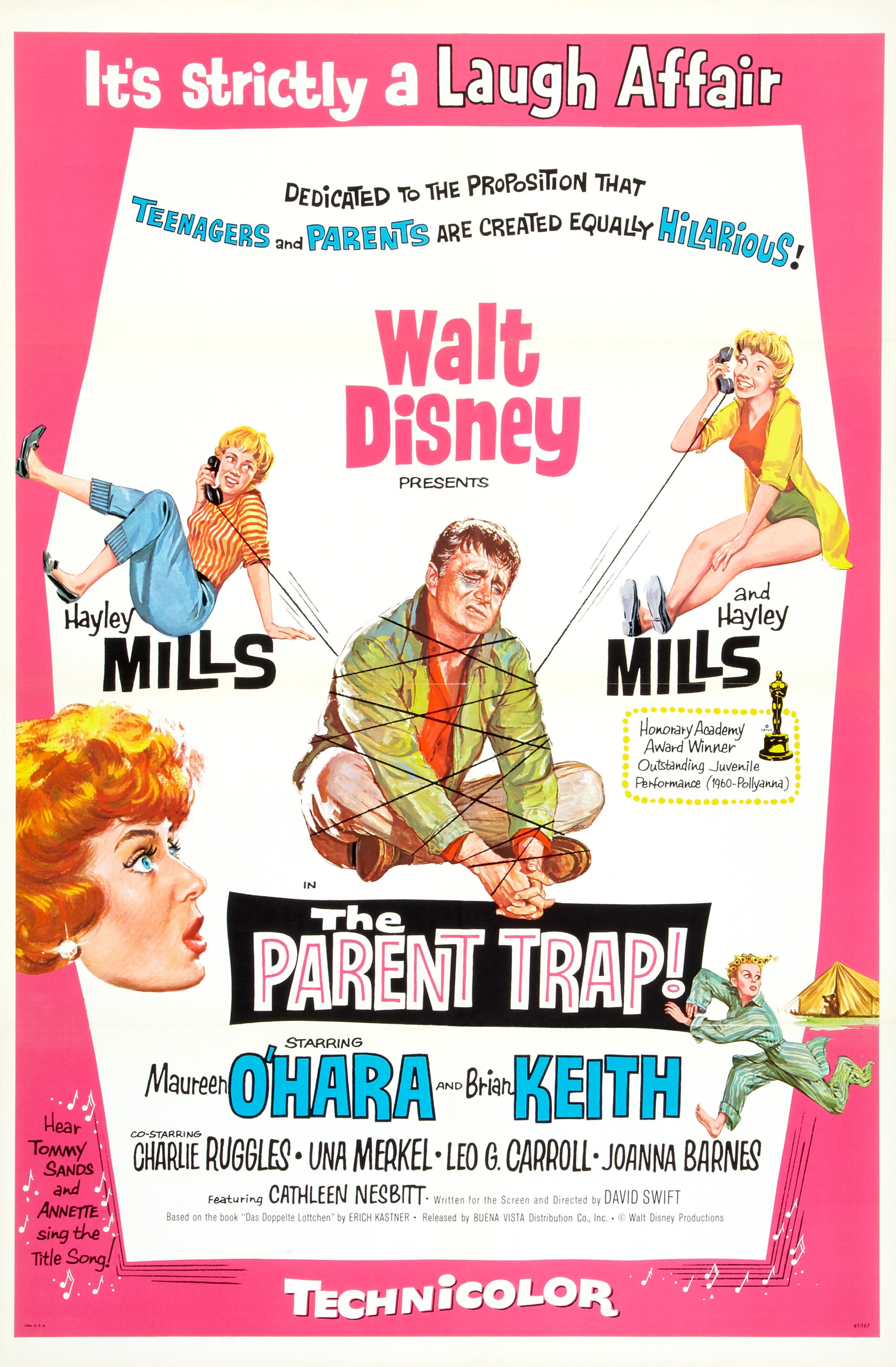
One-sheet poster for The Parent Trap (1961)

Maureen O'Hara filmography
Title	Year	Role	Notes	Ref(s)
Kicking the Moon Around	1938	Secretary	Vogue Film Productions	
My Irish Molly	1938	Eileen O'Shea	John Argyle Productions	
Jamaica Inn	1939	Mary Yellen	Mayflower Pictures Corp.	
The Hunchback of Notre Dame	1939	Esmeralda	RKO Pictures	
A Bill of Divorcement	1940	Sydney Fairfield	RKO Pictures	
Dance, Girl, Dance	1940	Judy O'Brien	RKO Pictures	
They Met in Argentina	1941	Lolita O'Shea	RKO Pictures	
How Green Was My Valley	1941	Angharad	20th Century Fox	
To the Shores of Tripoli	1942	Mary Carter	20th Century Fox	
Ten Gentlemen from West Point	1942	Carolyn Bainbridge	20th Century Fox	
The Black Swan	1942	Lady Margaret Denby	20th Century Fox	
Immortal Sergeant	1943	Valentine Lee	20th Century Fox	
This Land Is Mine	1943	Louise Martin	RKO Pictures	
The Fallen Sparrow	1943	Toni Donne	RKO Pictures	
Buffalo Bill	1944	Louisa Frederici Cody	20th Century Fox	
The Spanish Main	1945	Contessa Francesca	RKO Pictures	
Sentimental Journey	1946	Julie Beck / Weatherly	20th Century Fox	
Do You Love Me	1946	Katherine "Kitten" Hilliard	20th Century Fox	
Sinbad the Sailor	1947	Shireen	RKO Pictures	
The Homestretch	1947	Leslie Hale	20th Century Fox	
Miracle on 34th Street	1947	Doris Walker	20th Century Fox	
The Foxes of Harrow	1947	Odalie "Lilli" D'Arceneaux	20th Century Fox	
Sitting Pretty	1948	Tacey King	20th Century Fox	
A Woman's Secret	1949	Marian Washburn	RKO Pictures	
The Forbidden Street	1949	Adelaide "Addie" Culver	20th Century Fox	
Father Was a Fullback	1949	Elizabeth Cooper	20th Century Fox	
Bagdad	1949	Princess Marjan	Universal Pictures	
Comanche Territory	1950	Katie Howard	Universal Pictures	
Rio Grande	1950	Mrs. Kathleen Yorke	Argosy Pictures	
Tripoli	1950	Countess D'Arneau	Pine-Thomas Productions	
Flame of Araby	1951	Princess Tanya	Universal Pictures	
At Sword's Point	1952	Claire	RKO Pictures	
Kangaroo	1952	Dell McGuire	20th Century Fox	
The Quiet Man	1952	Mary Kate Danaher	Republic Pictures	
Against All Flags	1952	Prudence "Spitfire" Stevens	Universal Pictures	
The Redhead from Wyoming	1953	Kate Maxwell	Universal Pictures	
War Arrow	1953	Elaine Corwin	Universal Pictures	
Malaga	1954	Joanna Dane	Alternative title: Fire Over Africa; Film Locations Ltd.	
The Long Gray Line	1955	Mary O'Donnell	Columbia Pictures	
The Magnificent Matador	1955	Karen Harrison	20th Century Fox	
Lady Godiva of Coventry	1955	Lady Godiva	Universal Pictures	
Lisbon	1956	Sylvia Merrill	Republic Pictures	
Everything but the Truth	1956	Joan Madison	Universal Pictures	
The Wings of Eagles	1957	Min Wead	Metro-Goldwyn-Mayer	
Our Man in Havana	1959	Beatrice Severn	Kingsmead Productions	
The Deadly Companions	1961	Kit Tilden	Carousel Productions	
The Parent Trap	1961	Margaret "Maggie" McKendrick	Walt Disney Productions	
Mr. Hobbs Takes a Vacation	1962	Peggy Hobbs	Jerry Wald Productions	
Spencer's Mountain	1963	Olivia Spencer	Warner Bros.	
McLintock!	1963	Katherine Gilhooley McLintock	Batjac Productions	
The Battle of the Villa Fiorita	1965	Moira	Warner Bros.	
The Rare Breed	1966	Martha Price	Universal Pictures	
How Do I Love Thee?	1970	Elsie Waltz	ABC Pictures; Freeman-Enders	
Big Jake	1971	Martha McCandles	Batjac Productions	
Only the Lonely	1991	Rose Muldoon	20th Century Fox	

== Television ==
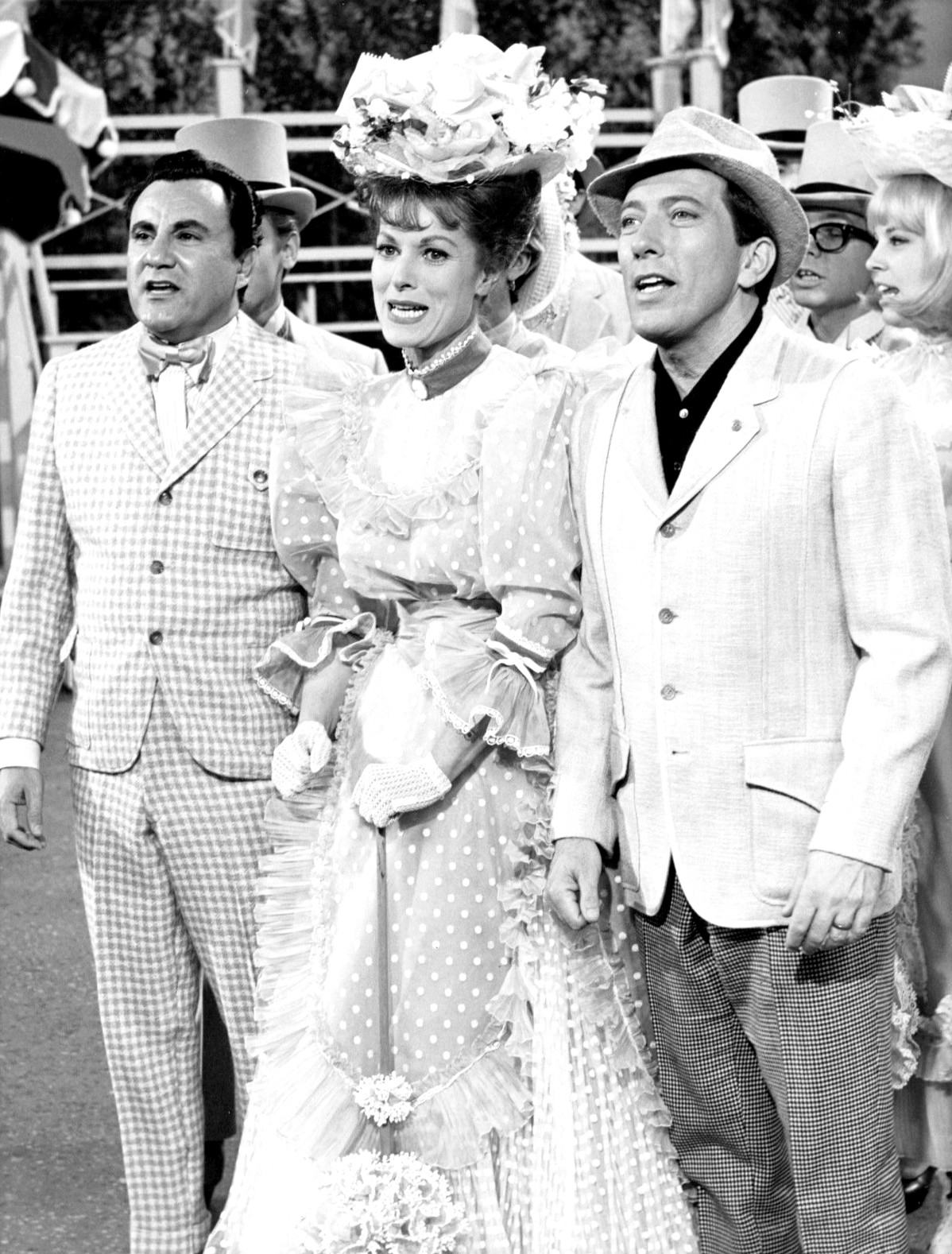
Bill Dana, Maureen O'Hara and Andy Williams performing on The Andy Williams Show (1965)

Television credits of Maureen O'Hara
Title	Year	Role	Notes	Ref(s)
DuPont Show of the Month	1960	Lady Marguerite Blakeney	The Scarlet Pimpernel on CBS	
Hallmark Hall of Fame	1963	Susanna Cibber	"A Cry of Angels"	
The Red Pony	1973	Ruth Tiflin	Television movie	
The Christmas Box	1995	Mary Parkin	Television movie	
Cab to Canada	1998	Katherine Eure	Television movie	
The Last Dance	2000	Helen Parker	Television movie	

== Bibliography ==
- Cronin, Jan S. (2019). The Making of ... Adaptation and the Cultural Imaginary. Cham, Switzerland. ISBN 978-3-030-28349-0.
- Malone, Aubrey (2013). Maureen O'Hara : the biography. Lexington : University Press of Kentucky. ISBN 978-0-8131-4238-8.
- McFarlane, Brian (2016). "Oo". The Encyclopedia of British Film (4th ed.). Manchester University Press. ISBN 9781526111975. OCLC 989751901. (subscription required)
