= Big Jake =

1971 film

- The second version of the theatrical release poster.
- Directed by: George Sherman
- Screenplay by: Harry Julian Fink; R. M. Fink
- Produced by: Michael Wayne
- Starring: John Wayne; Richard Boone; Patrick Wayne; Christopher Mitchum; Bobby Vinton; Bruce Cabot; Glenn Corbett; John Doucette; Maureen O'Hara
- Cinematography: William H. Clothier
- Edited by: Harry Gerstad
- Music by: Elmer Bernstein
- Production companies: Cinema Center Films; Batjac Productions
- Distributed by: National General Pictures
- Release date: May 26, 1971
- Running time: 110 minutes
- Country: United States
- Language: English
- Box office: $7.5 million

Big Jake is a 1971 American Technicolor Western film starring John Wayne, Richard Boone and Maureen O'Hara. The picture was the final film for George Sherman in a directing career of more than 30 years, and Maureen O'Hara's last film with John Wayne and her last before her twenty-year retirement. The supporting cast features Patrick Wayne, Christopher Mitchum, Glenn Corbett, Jim Davis, John Agar, Harry Carey Jr. and Hank Worden.

== Plot ==
In 1909, near the Mexico-United States border, Martha McCandles runs a massive ranch with the help of her sons Jeff, Michael, and James. The Fain Gang (The Fain Brothers, the Devries Brothers, John Goodfellow, Kid Duffy, Breed O'Brien, Pop Dawson, and Trooper) attacks the ranch, slaying many members of the staff. Jeff kills the elder of the Devries brothers but is badly wounded; his son, Jacob ("Little Jake") is kidnapped before the gang flees to Mexico, leaving behind a ransom note for $1 million.

Martha places the ransom in a strongbox, and delegates from both the United States Army and the Texas Rangers offer to take the box for her. Martha decides instead to send for her estranged husband Jacob "Big Jake" McCandles, who is generally thought to be dead but is really wandering the west as a gunfighter. Jake arrives with his black Rough Collie mix, simply named "Dog," and they confer in secret about what to do with the box.

Michael McCandles arrives on a motorcycle with news he has found the kidnappers. Martha decides to allow him and his older brother James to set off with the Rangers in REO Runabouts to try to overtake the kidnappers. Jake disapproves and sets off with the box, a mule, packhorses, and his elderly Apache friend Sam Sharpnose, preferring to do things the old-fashioned way. After the kidnappers ambush the Rangers, putting the cars out of commission, Jake allows his two sons to accompany him, although relations are strained between them.

John Fain, pretending to be only a messenger boy, intercepts the group and warns them that bandits are now after the box. He tells them the gang will kill Little Jake if Big Jake (who is pretending to be a hired hand) doesn't do things exactly the gang's way. He also arranges for the exchange to take place in the town of Escondero.

On arrival, the family checks into a hotel and lays a trap for the bandits, killing them. During the attack, the strongbox is accidentally opened, revealing the money has been replaced by newspaper clippings. Both boys believe Jake has stolen the money, until Jake explains that neither he nor Martha had ever intended to give the Fain Gang any payment after so many McCandles ranch people were either killed or wounded.

Pop Dawson arrives with a message to meet the gang with the money in an old fort outside town. He tells them the conditions - they are to ride together, and not try anything until after the gang has left with the money, because the gang's sharpshooter Duffy is hidden far away with a rifle trained on Little Jake at all times. Big Jake convinces Dawson that Michael was killed by the bandits, so he, James, Sam, and Dog follow Dawson to the fort.

Fain reveals he is the ringleader and reiterates Dawson's threats. Jake throws the key to Fain while Michael gets into position atop the fort's old water tower with his own rifle. Just as Fain opens the chest and realizes the deception, Big Jake opens fire and kills Fain's brother Will, who is holding Little Jake. Michael takes out Duffy, Sam kills Trooper, and James shoots down Dawson, Young Billy Devries, and O'Brien but breaks his left arm.

Fain and Big Jake find themselves both wounded and in a stalemate from behind their respective hiding places, and Big Jake tells his grandson to run to James. Goodfellow slashes Sam and Dog with his machete, killing the Indian, and pursues Little Jake into a stable, where Dog attacks Goodfellow a second time and is killed. Big Jake, out of bullets, makes a run for it and kills Goodfellow with a pitchfork in the stables.

John Fain corners the weaponless grandfather and grandson outside the stable, but Michael, having come down from his perch, shoots Fain from behind a stone wall. As Fain dies, Big Jake finally reveals his true identity to him, and to Little Jake, who has never met his grandfather before. Reunited at last, the family acknowledges their renewed bond and prepares to go home.

== Cast ==
- John Wayne as Jacob McCandles
- Richard Boone as John Fain (Leader of Fain's Gang)
- Maureen O'Hara as Martha McCandles
- Patrick Wayne as James McCandles
- Christopher Mitchum as Michael McCandles
- Bruce Cabot as Sam Sharpnose
- Bobby Vinton as Jeff McCandles
- Glenn Corbett as O'Brien, aka Breed (John Fain's Gang)
- John Doucette as Texas Ranger Capt. Buck Duggan
- Jim Davis as Head of lynching party
- Bernard Fox as Scottish shepherd
- John Agar as Bert Ryan
- Harry Carey Jr. as Pop Dawson (John Fain's Gang)
- Gregg Palmer as John Goodfellow (John Fain's Gang)
- Jim Burk as Trooper (John Fain's Gang)
- Dean Smith as James William "Kid" Duffy (John Fain's Gang)
- Robert Warner as Will Fain (John Fain's Brother, John Fain's Gang)
- Jeff Wingfield as Billy Devries (John Fain's Gang)
- Everett Creach as Walt Devries (John Fain's Gang)
- Roy Jenson as Gunman at bathhouse in Escondero
- Virginia Capers as Delilah
- Hank Worden as Hank
- Ethan Wayne as Little Jake McCandles
- William Walker as Moses Brown
- George Fenneman as Narrator
- Tom Hennesy as Mr. Sweet
- Chuck Roberson as Texas Ranger

== Production ==
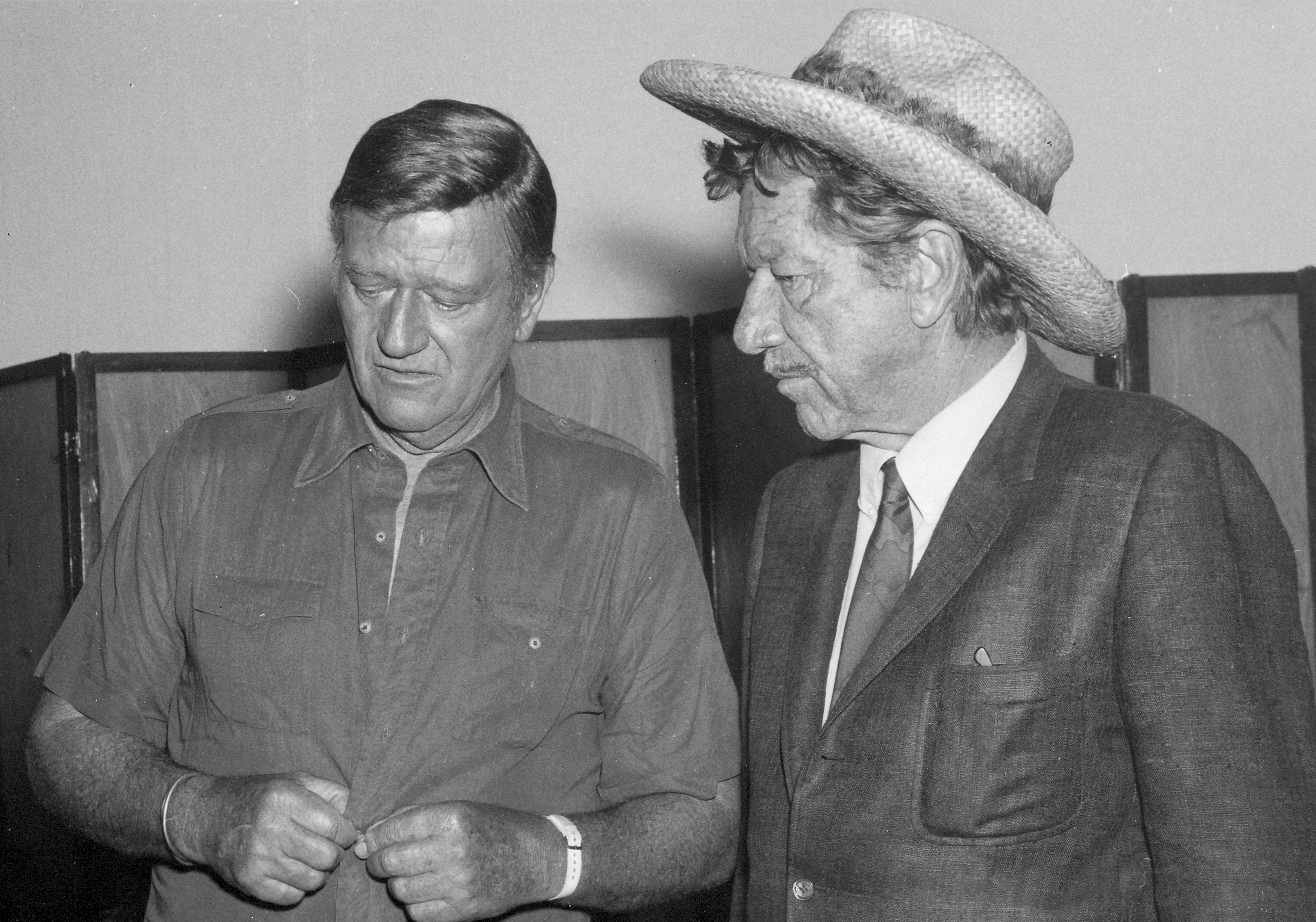
John Wayne and Richard Boone at the film's premiere at John Wayne Theatre at Knott's Berry Farm in 1971

Written as The Million Dollar Kidnapping, which was used as the shooting title, it was filmed from early October to early December 1970, in the Mexican states of Durango and Zacatecas, including scenes shot at the El Saltito waterfall and in the Sierra de Órganos National Park.

John Wayne's son, Patrick, portrays James McCandles. Robert Mitchum's son, Christopher, portrays Michael McCandles. Wayne's youngest son, Ethan, portrays Little Jake.

The picture was the final film for George Sherman in a directing career of more than 30 years, and Maureen O'Hara's last film with John Wayne and her last before her twenty-year retirement.

== Reception ==
Howard Thompson of The New York Times encouraged theatergoers to "stick it out" until the exciting climax, to which the rest of the film was a "long prelude" that "simply jogs along fairly tediously on the rescue trail, with the star being his laconic self, plus conventional spurts of violence, likewise the saddle humor." Gene Siskel of the Chicago Tribune gave the film 2 stars out of 4 and wrote, "With a little bit of restraint, the latest John Wayne Western, 'Big Jake,' might have been one of the veteran star's recent best. The most obvious excess, and this is unusual for a John Wayne film, is violence." Arthur D. Murphy of Variety wrote that the film had "[a]n above-average script, plus excellent direction by vet George Marshall and superior photography by William Clothire on Mexican locations," but was "gratuitously violent far beyond the legitimate requirements of the action plot." Kevin Thomas of the Los Angeles Times stated, "To say that 'Big Jake' is a typical John Wayne Western is pretty much to say it all. His fans should be well-satisfied with its tried and true combination of action and comedy. 'Big Jake' is scarcely distinguished but is certainly enjoyable." Gary Arnold of The Washington Post called it "a rather insufferable sort of 'typical' Wayne vehicle" with "an undercurrent of vindictiveness that spoils the ostensible humor. It's obvious that young actors are needed to appeal to younger viewers and to perform the kinds of physical action that require youth and dexterity and that Wayne is just too visibly massive and slow to accomplish these days—but they're treated almost exclusively as stooges ... There's no good reason why the young leads in a Wayne picture shouldn't be allowed to function with at least as much importance and dignity as Ricky Nelson in 'Rio Bravo' or the young actor who played opposite Joel McCrea and Randolph Scott in 'Ride the High Country' or, better yet, Montgomery Clift in 'Red River.'" Allen Eyles of The Monthly Film Bulletin declared, "Another genial celebration of Big John's ability to carry a film practically single-handed. Although supported by the group of dependables who usually appear in his films, as well as by a good proportion of his family, it is the Wayne personality—carefully catered for by the script—that accounts for most of the pleasure."

=== Box office ===
It grossed $7.5 million in the US.

== Home media ==
Big Jake was released to DVD by Paramount Home Entertainment on April 29, 2003, as a Region 1 widescreen DVD and on May 31, 2011, as a Region 1 widescreen Blu-ray DVD.

== See also ==
- List of American films of 1971
- John Wayne filmography
- Maureen O'Hara filmography
