= The Monte Carlo Show =

- Presented by: Patrick Wayne
- No. of episodes: ??

Production
- Production location: Monaco
- Running time: 60 minutes
- Production companies: Marty Pasetta Overseas and 20th Century Fox Television

Original release
- Release: 1980 – 1985

The Monte Carlo Show is a variety show that was produced in Monte Carlo and presented by Patrick Wayne. The show featured a French puppet sidekick Ploom the Caterpillar, created by puppeteer André Tahon. The show was taped live in Monaco and featured talent from around the world. The series was broadcast in the USA in 1980.

== International Broadcast ==
In 1981, the series was broadcast in the UK by ITV, and in 1982, The Benny Hill Show did a parody called The Monte Carbolic Show.
