= Breed of the Border (1933 film) =

1933 film

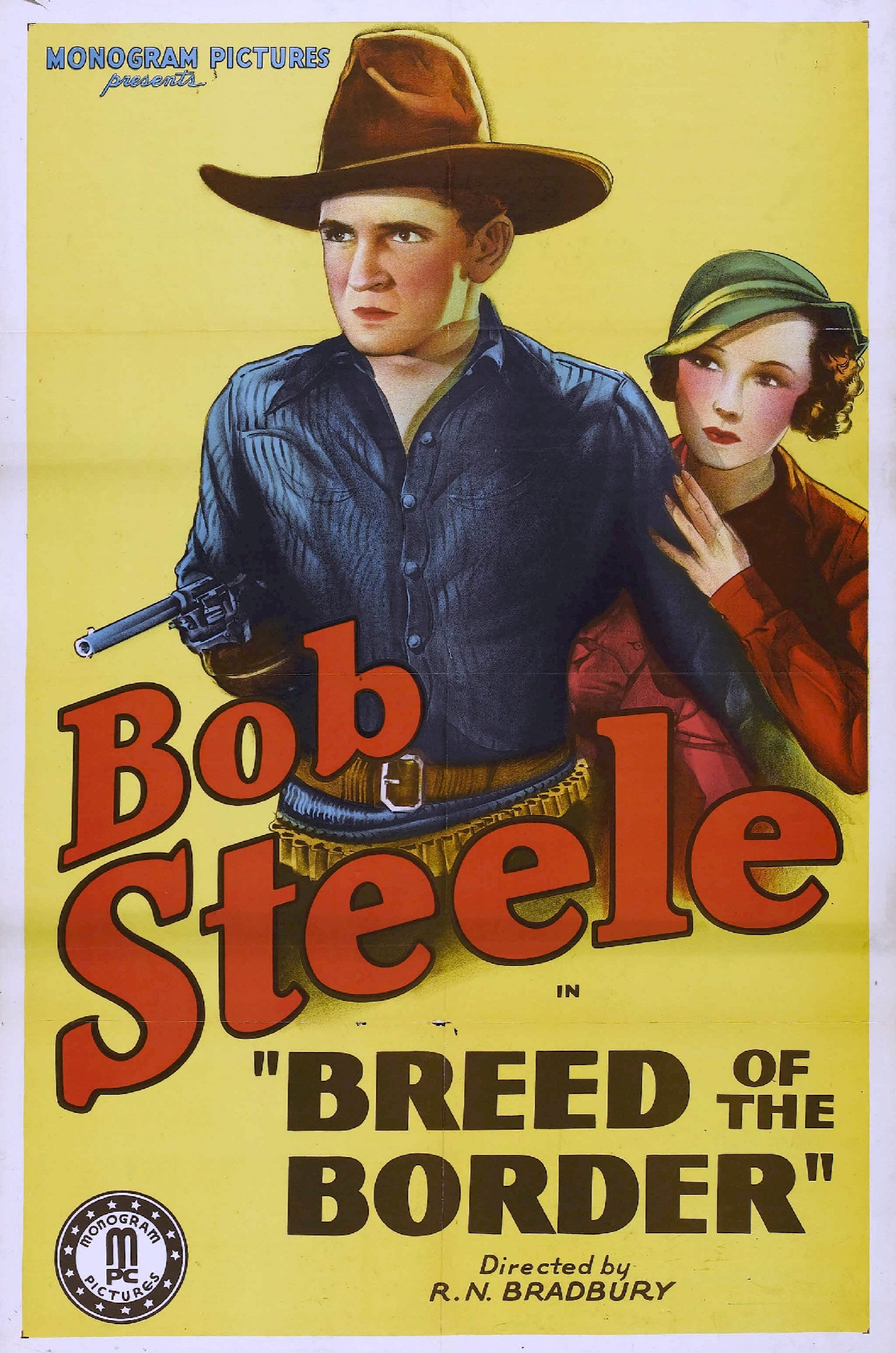
- Film poster
- Directed by: Robert N. Bradbury
- Written by: Harry L. Fraser (as Harry O. Jones)
- Produced by: Paul Malvern
- Cinematography: Archie Stout; Faxon Dean; Guy Newhardt
- Edited by: Carl Pierson
- Production company: Trem Carr Pictures
- Distributed by: Monogram Pictures
- Release date: March 1, 1933
- Running time: 6 reels; 60 minutes
- Country: United States
- Language: English

Breed of the Border is a 1933 American Western feature film directed by Robert N. Bradbury and starring Bob Steele. It was distributed through Monogram Pictures.

A print is preserved in the Library of Congress collection.

== Cast ==
- Bob Steele as Speed Brent
- Marion Byron as Sonia Bedford
- Ernie Adams as Joe the Killer
- George "Gabby" Hayes as Chuck Wiggins (credited as George Hayes)
- Henry Roquemore as Dutch Krause
- Fred Cavens as Mike (credited as Fred Cavins)
- John Elliott as Judge Stafford
- Perry Murdock as Red, a Henchman
- Bob Card as Spud, a Henchman
- Horace B. Carpenter as Dr. Bates (uncredited)
- Joe Dominguez as Pedro (uncredited)
- Jack Evans as Dugan - Barfly (uncredited)
- Herman Hack as Barfly (uncredited)
- Ray Jones as Saloon Brawler (uncredited)
- William McCall as Barfly (uncredited)
- George Morrell as Barfly (uncredited)
- Fred Parker as Barfly (uncredited)
- Hal Price as Border Inspector (uncredited)
- Blackie Whiteford as Saloon Brawler (uncredited)
