= Scream (1981 film) =

1981 film

- Theatrical release poster
- Directed by: Byron Quisenberry
- Written by: Byron Quisenberry
- Produced by: Byron Quisenberry; Clara Huff; Hal Buchanan
- Starring: Pepper Martin; Hank Worden; Ethan Wayne; Ann Bronston; Julie Marine
- Cinematography: Richard Pepin
- Edited by: B.W. Kestenberg
- Music by: Joseph Conlan
- Distributed by: Cal-Com Releasing
- Release date: October 28, 1983 (Tallahassee, Florida)
- Running time: 82 minutes
- Country: United States
- Language: English

Scream (also released as The Outing) is a 1981 American slasher film written and directed by Byron Quisenberry and starring Pepper Martin, Hank Worden, Ethan Wayne, Ann Bronston, and Julie Marine.

== Plot ==
A group of twelve people on a camping tour of the Rio Grande decide to spend the night in an old ghost town, and an unseen killer begins to dispatch them one by one. On the first night at the stroke of midnight, three of the group are killed in rapid succession: Allen is found hanged; his friends Ross and John are both hacked by a cleaver. In the morning, the nine survivors try to leave, but find their three rubber rafts slashed apart by someone (or something), forcing them to spend another night at the ghost town. During the day, two youths on motor dirt bikes arrive, and one of the guides, named Jerry, leaves with one of them to get help from a nearby ranch, which is over 30 miles away.

At nightfall, Bob takes over as de facto leader of the group and has them set up traps to try to trap the killer, but the unseen killer seems to evade them every time, leaving no evidence, not even footprints. Soon, the unseen killer strikes again by killing Rod, the other dirt bike youth, by throwing him through a wooden door. Jerry is soon found dead, and Andy is beaten and axed in the face. Bob is decapitated with a scythe, while Stan and the overweight, slow-witted Lou are badly injured in a scuffle.

At the stroke of midnight, a mysterious man on a horse arrives in the ghost town, who introduces himself as Charlie Winters. Charlie has one of the bodies of the two missing bike riders. Charlie tells the group that he has been hunting the killer for over 40 years and also claims that the culprit is the ghost of an old sea captain who drove people out of town years ago. The rest of the survivors are wary about trusting Charlie, but soon realize that he may be their only hope of survival.

When Charlie wanders off with no explanation, Rudy takes over as leader of the group and takes the survivors to barricade themselves in a woodshed as the killer tries to break in. Just when Lou is pulled out of the shed and is about to be killed, Charlie reappears and shoots the killer (revealed here to indeed be an invisible force), which then drops the scythe. Charlie then rides away into the night. Minutes later, a ranch owner and his wife arrive on the scene in a pickup truck to greet the relieved survivors.

== Cast ==
- Pepper Martin as Bob
- Hank Worden as John
- Ethan Wayne as Stan
- Ann Bronston as Marion
- Julie Marine as Laura
- Nancy St. Marie as Adriana
- Joseph Alvarado as Rudy
- Alvy Moore as Allen
- Bobby Diamond as Rod
- John Nowak as Jerry
- Joe Allaine as Lou
- Cynthia Faria as Janice
- Bella Bruck as Maggie
- Dee Cooper as Fred
- Bob Macgonigal as Andy
- Gino Difirelli as Len A. Lemont
- Gregg Palmer as Ross
- Woody Strode as Charlie Winters

== Production ==
Writer-director Byron Quisenberry was influenced by Agatha Christie's Ten Little Indians when writing the screenplay, though the production of the film was fairly loose, with the script being unfinished when the shooting had begun. Additionally, Quisenberry stated that the production was cut shorter than initially planned due to a lack of funding. The cast of the film was unaware of the killer's identity throughout the production. The film had the working title Butcher, Baker, Candlestick Maker.

The film was shot at Lake Piru and on the Paramount Pictures Movie Ranch in Agoura, California over a period of eleven days.

== Release ==
Scream was distributed by Cal-Com Releasing. It was released theatrically in 1983, with screenings beginning in Florida in October and November 1983.

=== Home media ===
Scream was then released on home video sometime in the mid-80s by Vestron Video. Media Blasters released a DVD of the film in 2010 under its Shriek Show label. The release included a widescreen transfer, mono sound mix, an audio commentary with director Byron Quisenberry, a TV spot, and a theatrical trailer.

Code Red DVD also distributed the film on DVD, as a double feature with the 1974 horror film The Barn of the Naked Dead. This release did not include the audio commentary with director Byron Quisenberry, the theatrical trailer, or the TV spot that were included in Media Blasters' release. Code Red subsequently issued a Blu-ray edition on January 23, 2017, followed by a reissue on June 8, 2021.

Dark Force Entertainment issued a 4K UHD Blu-ray release of the film on June 13, 2023.

== Reception ==
Upon its theatrical release in 1986 in New York City, the New York Daily News panned the film as "numbingly inept", adding that it "not only squanders 81 minutes' worth of perfectly good film stock", but also wastes the talents of actors Worden, Strode, and Moore.

In a 1988 Variety review, the film was called "tedious in the extreme" and "one of the crummiest horror films made during the late, unlamented boom of five years ago".

Charles Tatum of efilmcritic.com praised the ghost town set, although also stated that "(Quisenberry) cannot generate any suspense at all". He also bashed the special effects, stating that they "..serve as a subliminal Pavlovian trigger for french fries with extra ketchup".

Richard Mogg of Retroslashers.net wrote a mixed review of the film, stating that "...it had me roaring on the floor with all the nonsense going on. Sure it fails as a slasher but I'd still give it a passing grade for trying".

Oh-The-Horror.com wrote a generally negative review: "For what little it has going for it, Scream is just entirely too slow, too dull, and too vague".

DVD Verdict.com wrote a scathing review of the Code Red double-feature release, stating that "Scream is a hunk of lead from the Golden Age of Slashers, a cheap, dull, and bloodless concoction that's a chore to sit through. It's horrendously shot and wretchedly acted..." and criticized the transfer, saying that it "...looks pretty bad, with a good amount of print damage and lousy contrast, though that might be attributed to the source".

== Sources ==
- Newman, Kim (2011). Nightmare Movies: Horror on Screen Since the 1960s. Bloomsbury USA. ISBN 978-1-408-80503-9.
- Pitts, Michael (2012). Western Movies: A Guide to 5,105 Feature Films (2nd ed.). Jefferson, North Carolina: McFarland. ISBN 978-1-476-60090-1.
