= Vachellia caven var. microcarpa =

Scientific classification
- Kingdom: Plantae
- Clade: Tracheophytes
- Clade: Angiosperms
- Clade: Eudicots
- Clade: Rosids
- Order: Fabales
- Family: Fabaceae
- Subfamily: Caesalpinioideae
- Clade: Mimosoid clade
- Genus: Vachellia
- Species: V. caven
- Variety: V. c. var. microcarpa

Trinomial name
- Vachellia caven var. microcarpa (Speg.) Burkart ex Cialdella

Synonyms
- Acacia caven var. microcarpa (Speg.) Ciald.

Variety of legume

Vachellia caven var. microcarpa is a perennial tree native to Argentina and Paraguay.

== Bibliography ==
- Anthony E. Orchard & Annette J. G. Wilson: Flora of Australia: Mimosaceae Acacia, Band 11, Teil 1: Mimosaceae, Acacia, Csiro Publishing, 2001, 673 Seiten ISBN 9780643057029
- Clement, B.A., Goff, C.M., Forbes, T.D.A. Toxic Amines and Alkaloids from Acacia rigidula, Phytochem. 1998, 49(5), 1377.
- Shulgin, Alexander and Ann, TiHKAL the Continuation. Transform Press, 1997. ISBN 0-9630096-9-9
- Stephen Midgley, Peter Stevens, Ben Richardson, Paul Gioia & Nicholas Lander: WorldWideWattle - Webseite über die Akazien, mit einem Schwerpunkt auf die australischen Arten.
