= Pilar Pallete =

Peruvian-born American painter (born 1928)

Pilar Pallette
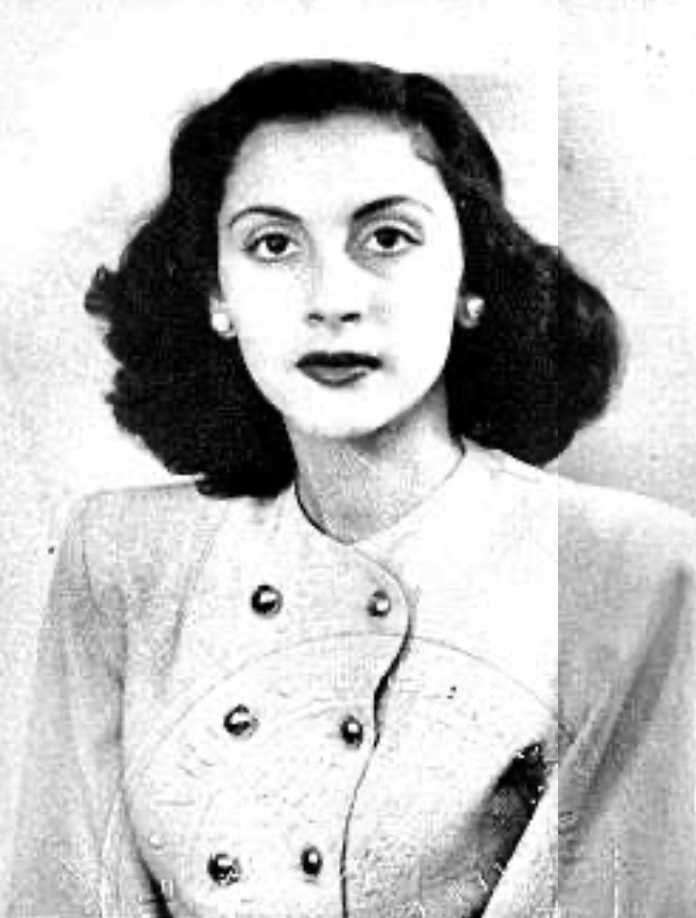
- Pallete in 1949
- Born: María del Pilar Pallette Alvarado; 3 September 1928 (age 97); Paita, Piura, Peru
- Other names: Pilar Weldy; Pilar Morrison; Pilar Wayne; Pilar Wayne Stewart; Pilar Wayne Upchurch
- Education: Colegio Villa María
- Occupations: Painter; actress
- Years active: 1950–present
- Political party: Republican
- Spouses: Richard Weldy (m. 1950; ann. 1953) John Wayne (m. 1954; died 1979) Stephen Stewart (m. 1984; div. 1997) Jesse L. Upchurch (m. 1998; div. 2010)
- Children: 3, including Ethan Wayne
- Relatives: Michael Wayne (stepson); Patrick Wayne (stepson); Jennifer Wayne (granddaughter)
- Website: Official website; pilarwayneart.com

Signature
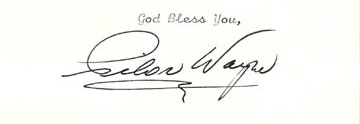

María del Pilar Pallette Alvarado (born 3 September 1928), known professionally as Pilar Pallette, is a Peruvian-born American painter and occasional actress. She became well-known through her marriage to the actor John Wayne.

== Early life ==
María del Pilar Pallete Alvarado was born in Paita, Piura, Peru on 3 September 1928, as the second child to Miguel Ángel Pallete Cañote, a Peruvian senator, and his wife, Carmela Maria (née Alvarado Zegarra). She has three siblings: an elder sister, Josefina Rosario "Josephine" Stinson (née Pallete Alvarado), and two younger siblings, Marcela Lina de la Torre (née Pallete Alvarado) and Miguel Angel Pallete.

Pallete grew up in Lima, where she attended Collegio Villa María, a private Catholic primary and secondary school for girls.

Pallete worked in the offices of Pan American-Grace Airways in the Limatambo International Airport from the age of 14, having lied about her age. She worked as a passenger greeter for Braniff International Airways from the age of 15, having lied about her age again. She also worked as a stewardess for Peruvian International Airways.

== Career ==
Pallete made her debut in Peru in 1950, after participating in the English-speaking theatre club, Lima Theatre Workshop. She moved to Los Angeles in early 1953, to dub a film, Sabotear en la selva, in English, and in February 1953, she signed a long term movie contract with Wayne-Fellows Productions, the production company owned by her future husband, John Wayne, and his associate, Robert Fellows. She made an uncredited appearance in The Alamo (1960).

Pallete rented a studio inside the Fernleaf Courtyard in Corona Del Mar, California, during the 1960s. She would entertain her clients outdoors with coffee and finger sandwiches, and found herself, a year later, with a full-time restaurant. She is now a full-time restaurateur, who, in more recent years, owned Pilar's. She has worked as a lecturer in Newport Beach, California.

Pallete authored Pilar Wayne's Favorite and Fabulous Recipes (ISBN 1-55859-474-4), a cook book, which was published by PAX Pub Co. in 1983. She authored John Wayne: My Life With the Duke (ISBN 9780070686625), a memoir, which was co-written with the Irvine-based freelance journalist, Alex Thorleifson, and published by McGraw-Hill in 1987. She went on a five-week nationwide book promotion tour, sponsored by the National Enquirer, which paid US$50,000 for serialization rights to the book. She received many offers after Wayne's death to write a book about their marriage, but always declined. She said she wrote the book to "protect his image and to do it for my kids, so they know the real story."

Pallete appeared on The John Wayne Gritcast podcast series, where she was interviewed by her son, Ethan Wayne. The episode, "Episode 3 – Pilar Wayne", was released on 14 October 2021. Her younger daughter, Marisa, was also present.

Pallete devotes up to six hours a day to her paintings. Her work is featured on her website, pilarwayneart.com, and has been exhibited all over the world.

== Personal life ==
Pallete married her first husband, Richard Junior Weldy, an Irish executive at Pan American-Grace Airways who was seven years her senior, in Lima on 8 July 1950. She was known as Pilar Weldy. The couple separated in 1952, when she discovered that Weldy had not finalized his January 1950 divorce from his first wife, Ida Katherine Weldy. She obtained an annulment on 28 October 1953 in Los Angeles County Superior Court.

Pallete met her second husband, John Wayne, an American actor 21 years her senior, in Tingo María in 1952, while she was still married to her first husband. Wayne was in Peru scouting locations for The Alamo (1960). She ran into Wayne for a second time upon her move to Los Angeles, California, in 1953. The couple were married in the garden of the Keauhou, Hawaii, home of Senator William Henry Hill on 1 November 1954, the same day as Wayne's divorce from Esperanza "Chata" Baur was finalized. Pallete underwent an abortion in the months leading up to their wedding. They had three children together: Aissa Maria Wayne (born 31 March 1956), John Ethan Wayne (born 22 February 1962) and Marisa Carmela Wayne (born 22 February 1966). Upon her marriage to Wayne, she gained four stepchildren: Michael Wayne (1934–2003), Mary Antonia "Toni" Wayne LaCava (1936–2000), Patrick Wayne (born 1939), and Melinda Ann Wayne Munoz (1940–2022), from her husband's first marriage to Josephine Alicia Saenz. The couple traveled extensively during the next ten years of their marriage, usually on location for Wayne's many films. She became a U.S. citizen on 16 November 1962. In 1965 the Wayne family moved to Newport Beach, where, two years later, as an avid tennis player, she encouraged Wayne to build the John Wayne Tennis Club. She moved out of their house in 1971, however, she stated they were never separated or divorced and has maintained her stance that they remained married until Wayne's death from stomach cancer on 11 June 1979, at the age of 72. Pallete was 50 years old at the time of Wayne's death. Wayne left an estate worth US$6.85M, which she was excluded from, having been provided for in the separation agreement. She has five grandchildren, including Jennifer Wayne, from the country music group Runaway June. In 2023, she said that she keeps Wayne's memory alive through painting.

Pallete married her third husband, Stephen Charles Stewart, who was five years her junior, an American municipal court judge, in Orange, California, on 6 October 1984, five years after Wayne's death. Upon her marriage to Stewart, she gained two stepchildren. She was known as Pilar Wayne Stewart. She later described their brief marriage as a "two-week mistake". The couple divorced in 1997, after 12 years of marriage.

Pallete married her fourth husband, Jesse Lloyd Upchurch, who was four years her senior, an American travel company executive, in Johnson, Texas, on 22 May 1998. Upon her marriage to Upchurch, she gained four stepchildren. She was known as Pilar Wayne Upchurch. They split their time between their homes on the Back Bay in Newport Beach and Dallas. The couple divorced in Tarrant on 10 March 2010, after 11 years of marriage.

Pallete was best friends with Koi, the older sister of Bob O'Hill, a very close Wayne family friend.

Pallete is a registered Republican, although not as politically active as Wayne. In 1990, she said: "Duke and I have always supported the Republican Party, like most of Orange County, I guess." On 25 January 1990, she let the party of Orange County use her home for a US$1,000 per-couple, fundraising cocktail reception for Senator Pete Wilson in his campaign for governor. She was friends with Donald Trump, and his second wife, Marla Maples, during their six-year-marriage. She vacationed at Mar-a-Lago in Palm Beach, Florida.

Pallete was previously diagnosed with cancer. She underwent surgery at the John Wayne Cancer Institute in Santa Monica, California on 24 May 2006 and revealed that she was cancer-free that August.

Pallete often lends her name to charity events.

=== 1956 Confidential hoax ===
In September 1956, Confidential magazine founder Robert Harrison generated front-page headlines around the world when he allegedly was shot in the shoulder during a safari in the Dominican Republic by Richard Weldy, a travel agency owner and Pallete's first husband. The shooter, Weldy, variously described as a "jungle trapper and guide" or "a big game hunter," purportedly harbored a grudge over a Confidential story about Pallete. The nonexistent Confidential article depicted Pallete as having an affair with John Wayne while married to Weldy. According to newspaper accounts, Weldy fled the scene, leaving Harrison to die alone in the jungle with his blonde girlfriend; the two were eventually rescued by either the Dominican Army or local police and boy scouts. Newspapers reported that Weldy was later arrested by police. But Harrison refused to press charges against Weldy and the two publicly reconciled. Later the whole story was revealed to be a hoax—the shooting never took place. Photos of a wounded Harrison in a hospital were staged, complete with an actor playing a physician. Even the "girlfriend" was an actress that Harrison hired for the publicity stunt. Samuel Bernstein's volume on Harrison is one of the few sources to note that no Confidential Pallete article was on the newsstands at the time of the "shooting" incident. The Confidential article that did eventually appear admitted that Pallete was already divorced from Weldy when she met Wayne.

== Filmography ==
Year	Title	Role	Notes
1953	Sabotear en la selva		Dubbed in English
1960	The Alamo	Alamo Woman	Uncredited
