= Simone Cavens =

American silent film actress

- Cavens in 1909
- Born: Elisabeth F. Syemons; 1887; Brussels, Belgium
- Died: 1971; Los Angeles, California
- Other names: Simone Simon; Mrs. Fred Cavens
- Occupations: Dancer and actress
- Works: Dad's College Widow (1916); Bumble's Job (1916)
- Spouse: Fred Cavens (m. 1906; died 1962)
- Children: Albert Cavens

Simone Cavens (1887–1971) was a Belgian dancer and appeared as an actress in at least three American silent film: Dad's College Widow, Bumble's Job, and Revelations.

Cavens, who was born Elisabeth F. Syemons, was the sister of Argentinian socialite Enriqueta S. de Estrugamou, and the wife of Belgian swordsman Fred Cavens, whom she married in 1906. She and her husband had a son, Albert "Cupid" Cavens.

Before emigrating to the United States, she was a principal dancer at the Opéra-Comique in Paris, the Opéra de la Monnaie in Brussels, and the Opera Coliseo in Buenos Aires. As a dancer, she performed as Simone Simon (but is not related to the actress of that name).

Both mother and son (then a child actor) were associated with the Flying A Studios in Santa Barbara, California. In 1916 she played the title role in Dad's College Widow alongside Orral Humphrey. That same year, she played Mr. Bumble's wife in Bumble's Job, again beside Humphrey. Also in 1916, she appeared in Mutual Film's feature Revelations.

Cavens died in Los Angeles in 1971.

== Filmography ==
Film
Year	Title	Role	Notes
1916	Dad's College Widow	Flavia Peterson—the college widow	Short
1916	Bumble's Job	Mrs. Bumble	Short
1916	Revelations	One of the American-Mutual players	Feature
