= Vachellia caven var. dehiscens =

Scientific classification
- Kingdom: Plantae
- Clade: Tracheophytes
- Clade: Angiosperms
- Clade: Eudicots
- Clade: Rosids
- Order: Fabales
- Family: Fabaceae
- Subfamily: Caesalpinioideae
- Clade: Mimosoid clade
- Genus: Vachellia
- Species: V. caven
- Variety: V. c. var. dehiscens

Trinomial name
- Vachellia caven var. dehiscens Ciald.

Synonyms
- Acacia caven var. dehiscens Ciald.

Variety of legume

Vachellia caven var. dehiscens is a perennial tree native to Argentina.
