= Vachellia caven var. stenocarpa =

Scientific classification
- Kingdom: Plantae
- Clade: Tracheophytes
- Clade: Angiosperms
- Clade: Eudicots
- Clade: Rosids
- Order: Fabales
- Family: Fabaceae
- Subfamily: Caesalpinioideae
- Clade: Mimosoid clade
- Genus: Vachellia
- Species: V. caven
- Variety: V. c. var. stenocarpa

Trinomial name
- Vachellia caven var. stenocarpa (Speg.)

Synonyms
- Acacia caven var. stenocarpa (Speg.) Ciald.

Variety of legume

Vachellia caven var. stenocarpa is a perennial tree native, and found in Argentina and Paraguay.
