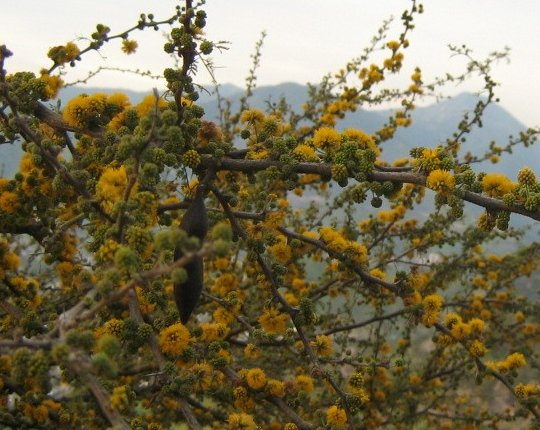

Scientific classification
- Kingdom: Plantae
- Clade: Tracheophytes
- Clade: Angiosperms
- Clade: Eudicots
- Clade: Rosids
- Order: Fabales
- Family: Fabaceae
- Subfamily: Caesalpinioideae
- Clade: Mimosoid clade
- Genus: Vachellia
- Species: V. caven

Binomial name
- Vachellia caven (Molina) Seigler & Ebinger

Varieties
- Vachellia caven var. caven; Vachellia caven var. dehiscens Ciald.; Vachellia caven var. microcarpa (Speg.) Ciald.; Vachellia caven var. stenocarpa (Speg.) Ciald.
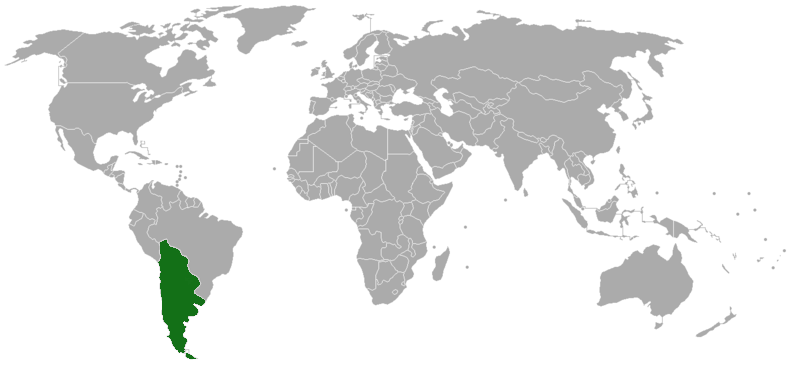
- Range of Vachellia caven

Synonyms
- Acacia caven (Molina) Molina; Acacia cavenia (Molina) Hook. & Arn.; Mimosa caven Molina; Mimosa cavenia Molina

= Vachellia caven =

Species of plant

Vachellia caven (Roman cassie, aromita, aromo criollo, caven, churque, churqui, espinillo, espinillo de baado, espino, espino maulino) is an ornamental tree in the family Fabaceae. Vachellia caven is native to Argentina, Bolivia, Chile, Paraguay, Uruguay and Rio Grande do Sul in Brazil. It grows four to five metres tall and bears very stiff and sharp white thorns up to 2 cm in length. It blooms in spring, with bright yellow flower clusters 1–2 cm (0.39–0.79 in) in diameter.

== Ecology ==
Prominent occurrences of V. caven are within the Chilean matorral of central Chile, where the species is a common associate of the Chilean Wine Palm, Jubaea chilensis.

The flowers of V. caven are used as food for bees in the production of honey.

== Uses ==
=== Human consumption ===
The seeds of this tree can be roasted and used to brew a drink in a similar way to coffee seeds.

=== Erosion control ===
The tree is used for erosion control.

=== Ornamental tree ===
The tree has ornamental uses.

=== Industrial ===
Tannin from the seed pods is used for tanning hides. The wood is used as fuel and to make posts for fences. The chief current human use for V. caven is in the production of charcoal.

The flowers are used in perfume.
