= John Caven =

John Caven may refer to:

- John Caven (American politician) (1824–1905), Indiana politician and Freemason
- John Caven (Canadian politician) (born c. 1838), Ontario farmer and political figure
- John Caven (footballer) (born 1934), Scottish footballer
