= Albert Cavens =

American actor

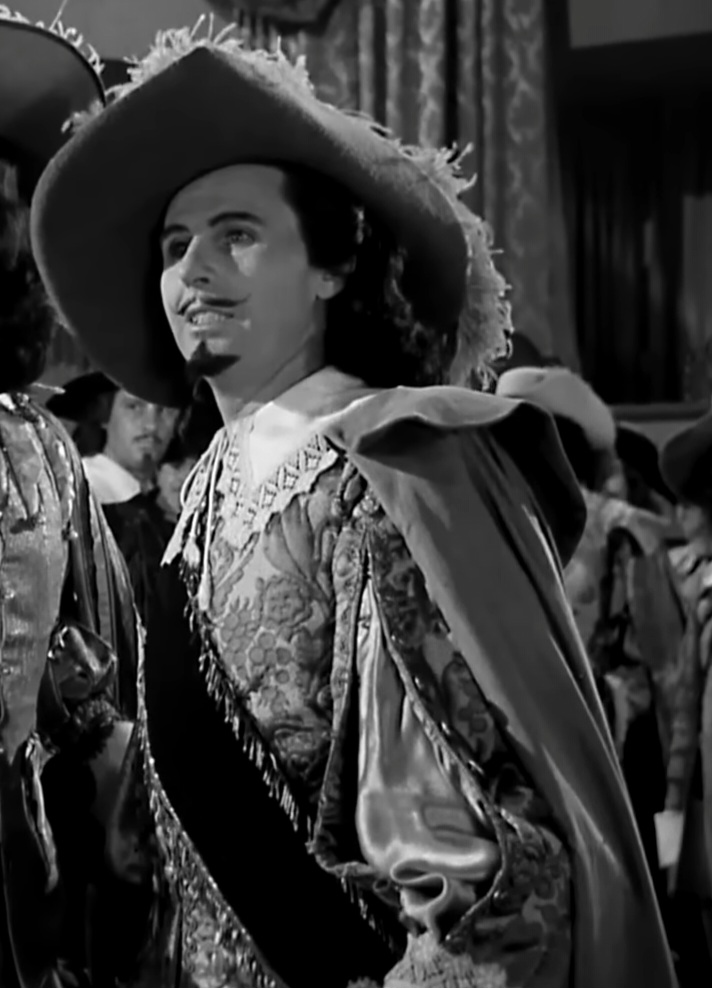
- Cavens in Cyrano de Bergerac (1950)
- Born: 1 October 1906; Brussels, Belgium
- Died: 17 December 1985 (aged 79); Los Angeles, California, U.S.
- Resting place: Grand View Memorial Park Cemetery in Glendale, California
- Other names: Al Cavens; Cupid Cavens
- Occupation: Actor
- Years active: 1913–1972
- Parent(s): Fred Cavens and Simone Cavens

Albert Cavens (1 October 1906 – 17 December 1985) was a Belgian-born American actor.

== Biography ==
Cavens moved to the United States soon after birth and began his career only aged 8 in a number of films in 1914, including The Town of Nazareth, also starring Charlotte Burton. As a child actor, he was known as Cupid, Cupie, or Kewpie, and associated with the Flying A Studios.

After 1914, Cavens took a break from acting. He returned to it as an adult over thirty years later, playing Valvert, the nobleman whom Cyrano duels with while reciting a poem, in Cyrano de Bergerac (1950). (Cavens was the son of Fred Cavens, a fencing instructor in Hollywood, and Simone Cavens, a dance teacher). Between 1950 and 1969, he made a number of appearances in film and television, and appeared in Star Trek in 1969 shortly before his retirement

Cavens died in 1985. He was buried in Grand View Memorial Park Cemetery in Glendale, California.

== Filmography ==
Film
| Year | Title | Role | Notes |
|---|---|---|---|
| 1914 | A Slice of Life | Bobby Harte | Short |
| 1915 | The Unseen Vengeance | The boy, 5 years old | As Cupid Cavens |
| 1943 | Edge of Darkness | Soldier | Uncredited |
| 1946 | Monsieur Beaucaire | | Uncredited |
| 1949 | California | Miner | Uncredited |
| 1947 | The Farmer's Daughter | Photographer | Uncredited |
| 1947 | Secret Beyond the Door | Guest in Home Tour | Uncredited |
| 1948 | Return of the Bad Men | Townsman | Uncredited |
| 1948 | Adventures of Don Juan | Spanish Soldier | Uncredited |
| 1949 | The Beautiful Blonde from Bashful Bend | Townsman | Uncredited |
| 1949 | Barbary Pirate | Pirate | Uncredited |
| 1950 | Young Man with a Horn | Club Patron | Uncredited |
| 1950 | The Flame and the Arrow | Guard | Uncredited |
| 1950 | Dial 1119 | Bus Passengen | Uncredited |
| 1950 | Cyrano de Bergerac | Vicomte de Valvert | |
| 1950 | Gambling House | Court Clerk | Uncredited |
| 1951 | Call Me Mister | Reporter | Uncredited |
| 1951 | Double Crossbones | Pirate | Uncredited |
| 1951 | The Law and the Lady | Servant | Uncredited |
| 1951 | Starlift | Field Officer | Uncredited |
| 1952 | At Sword's Point | Claire's Fencing Instructor | Uncredited |
| 1952 | The Half-Breed | Clerk | Uncredited |
| 1952 | Clash by Night | Restaurant Patron | Uncredited |
| 1952 | Hellgate | Prisoner | Uncredited |
| 1953 | The Mississippi Gambler | Etienne - Fencing Instructor | Uncredited |
| 1953 | Affair with a Stranger | Minor Role | Uncredited |
| 1953 | The Robe | Sword-fighting Soldier | Uncredited |
| 1954 | White Christmas | Soldier | Uncredited |
| 1956 | Tennessee's Partner | Townsman | Uncredited |
| 1956 | Forever, Darling | Theatre Patron | Uncredited |
| 1956 | A Kiss Before Dying | Restaurant Patron | Uncredited |
| 1956 | The First Traveling Saleslady | Cattleman at Desk | Uncredited |
| 1956 | Beyond a Reasonable Doubt | Police Officer | Uncredited |
| 1956 | Tension at Table Rock | Trail Herder | Uncredited |
| 1956 | Around the World in 80 Days | Featured player | Uncredited |
| 1957 | Jailhouse Rock | Nightclub Patron | Uncredited |
| 1958 | As Young as We Are | Jessup | Uncredited |
| 1958 | The Party Crashers | Waiter | Uncredited |
| 1959 | Stranger in My Arms | Memorial Service Attendee | Uncredited |
| 1959 | Rio Bravo | Henchman | Uncredited |
| 1959 | Al Capone | Police Officer | Uncredited |
| 1959 | The Wild and the Innocent | Townsman | Uncredited |
| 1959 | The Purple Gang | Police Officer | Uncredited |
| 1960 | Oklahoma Territory | Juror | Uncredited |
| 1960 | The Boy and the Pirates | Dutch Captain | |
| 1960 | One Foot in Hell | Townsman | Uncredited |
| 1961 | Pocketful of Miracles | Reception Guest | Uncredited |
| 1962 | Kid Galahad | Fight Spectator | Uncredited |
| 1962 | The Manchurian Candidate | Delegate | Uncredited |
| 1963 | The Jolly Genie | Antique Dealer | |
| 1963 | It's a Mad, Mad, Mad, Mad World | Spectator | Uncredited |
| 1964 | Bedtime Story | Casino Patron | Uncredited |
| 1965 | How to Murder Your Wife | Juror | Uncredited |
| 1965 | The Glory Guys | Trooper | Uncredited |
| 1965 | McHale's Navy Joins the Air Force | Bar Patron | Uncredited |
| 1966 | The Ghost and Mr. Chicken | Trial Spectator | Uncredited |
| 1967 | The Adventures of Bullwhip Griffin | Townsman | Uncredited |
| 1967 | How to Succeed in Business Without Really Trying | Treasure Hunter | Uncredited |
| 1967 | The St. Valentine's Day Massacre | Reporter | Uncredited |
| 1968 | The Shakiest Gun in the West | Townsman | Uncredited |
| 1969 | More Dead Than Alive | Barfly | Uncredited |
| 1969 | True Grit | Boarding House Guest | Uncredited |
| 1969 | The Love God? | Club Patron | Uncredited |
| 1969 | The Great Bank Robbery | Townsman | Uncredited |
| 1970 | The Phynx | Meeting Guest | Uncredited |
Television
| Year | Title | Role | Notes |
| 1954 | My Little Margie | | 1 episode |
| 1957-1961 | Zorro | Ship's Captain, Bandit at Meeting, Avilla's Second Opponent, Sailor | 4 episodes |
| 1959 | Peter Gunn | Bank Guard | 1 episode |
| 1961 | The Wonderful World of Disney | Sailor | 1 episode |
| 1961 | Have Gun – Will Travel | Jaillet | 1 episode |
| 1961 | The Many Loves of Dobie Gillis | | 1 episode |
| 1967-1968 | The Invaders | | 3 episodes (uncredited) |
| 1969 | Star Trek | Second Fop | S3:E23, "All Our Yesterdays" |
