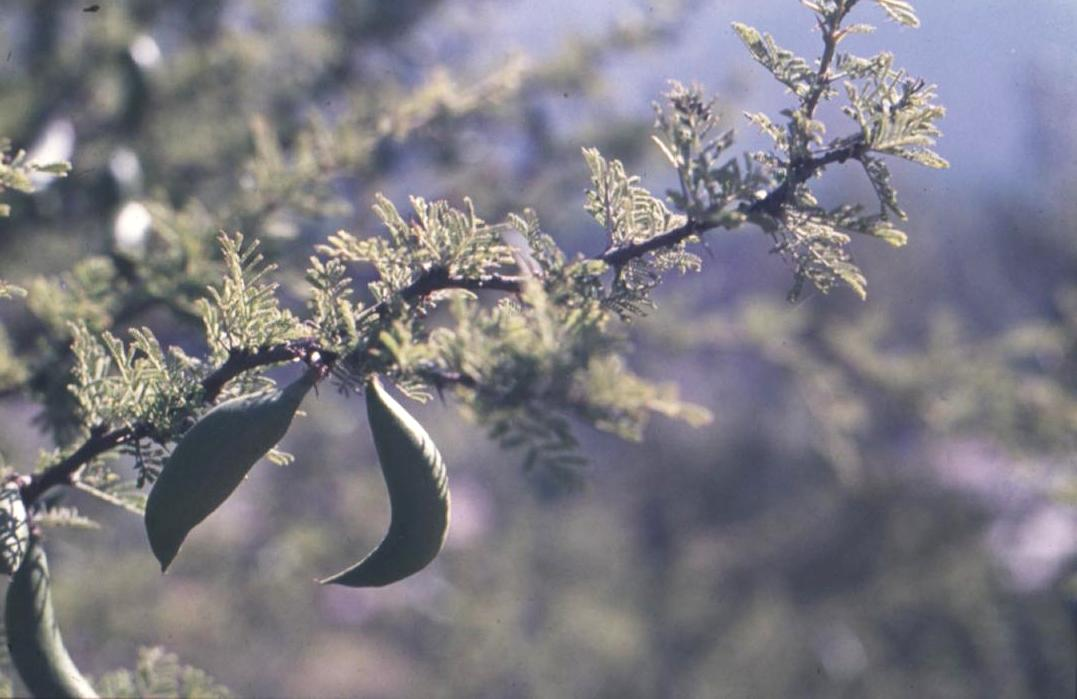

Scientific classification
- Kingdom: Plantae
- Clade: Tracheophytes
- Clade: Angiosperms
- Clade: Eudicots
- Clade: Rosids
- Order: Fabales
- Family: Fabaceae
- Subfamily: Caesalpinioideae
- Clade: Mimosoid clade
- Genus: Vachellia
- Species: V. caven (Molina) Seigler & Ebinger
- Variety: V. c. var. caven

Trinomial name
- Vachellia caven var. caven

Synonyms
- Acacia caven var. caven

= Vachellia caven var. caven =

Variety of legume

Vachellia caven var. caven is a perennial tree native to South America.
