= Fred Cavens =

Belgian actor and fencer (1882–1962)

Frédéric Adolphe Cavens (30 August 1882, Laeken, Belgium – 30 April 1962, Woodland Hills, California) was a Belgian-born fencing master who emigrated to Hollywood and worked as an actor, stuntman and fencing master from the silent film era, then in television. He trained Jean Peters in the film Anne of the Indies (1951) and Guy Williams in the television role of Zorro.

Cavens was married to Elisabeth F. Syemons (1886–1971); they were the parents of Albert Frederic Rene Cavens, who followed in his father's footsteps.

== Filmography ==
Complete filmography

=== Director (feature film) ===
- The Three Must-Get-Theres (1922) as Assistant Director

=== Cast (feature film) ===
- The Three Must-Get-Theres (1922) as Bernajoux
- The Sword of Valor (1924)
- The King of Kings (1927) (uncredited)
- The Iron Mask (1929) as DeRochefort's Ruffian (uncredited)
- Breed of the Border (1933) as Mike Cavins
- The World Moves On (1934) as French taxi driver (uncredited)
- Paris Interlude (1934) as Mechanic (uncredited)
- The Count of Monte Cristo (1934) as Fencing Master (uncredited)
- The Merry Widow (1934) as Gendarme (uncredited)
- Marie Galante (1934) as Postmaster (uncredited)
- Kid Courageous (1935) as Louie - Henchman (uncredited)
- Lottery Lover (1935) as French stage doorman (uncredited)
- Folies Bergère de Paris (1935) as Airport official (uncredited)
- Love on the Run (1936) as French waiter (uncredited)
- Café Metropole (1937) as Train guard (uncredited)
- Kidnapped (1938) as Minor Role (uncredited)
- Artists and Models Abroad (1938) as Guard (uncredited)
- The Man in the Iron Mask (1939) as Francois (uncredited)
- Pack Up Your Troubles (1939) as French infantry captain (uncredited)
- Eagle Squadron (1942) as Frenchman (uncredited)
- Around the World (1943) as Instructor (uncredited)
- Ali Baba and the Forty Thieves (1944) as Thief (uncredited)
- Till We Meet Again (1944) as Carpenter (uncredited)
- The Exile (1947) as Alec - Coachman
- Fortunes of Captain Blood (1950) as Turnkey (uncredited)
- Lydia Bailey (1952) as Fencing instructor (uncredited)
- The Iron Mistress (1952) as Aged Swordsman (uncredited)
- Dreamboat (1952) as Fencer (uncredited)
- The Mississippi Gambler (1953) as Emile Maitre - Fencing Master (uncredited)
- The Robe (1953) as Sword-fighting soldier (uncredited)
- Around the World in 80 Days (1956) as Minor Role (uncredited)
- The Lost World (1960) as French member (uncredited)
- Hell Is for Heroes (1962) as Old Man (uncredited) (final film role)

=== Dance (feature film) ===
- The Three Musketeers (1935) as Dance arr.

=== Feature film production ===
- Queen Christina (1933), sword fight staging by
- Cardinal Richelieu (1935) as Research dir
- Romeo and Juliet (1936), created and staged duels and sword fights
- Tower of London (1939) as Fencing instructor
- The Man in the Iron Mask (1939) as Fencing dir.
- The Black Swan (1942) as Fencing instructor
- Ali Baba and the Forty Thieves (1944) as Fencing instructor
- Don Ricardo Returns (1946) as Fencing instructor
- Forever Amber (1947) as Technical Advisor
- The Black Arrow (1948) as Fencing master
- Bagdad (1949) as Technical Advisor
- Adventures of Don Juan (1949) as Fencing instructor
- Buccaneer's Girl (1950) as Fencing instructor
- Cyrano de Bergerac (1951) as Fencing master
- Anne of the Indies (1951) as Jean Peters' fencing instructor
- Lydia Bailey (1952) as Fencing instructor
- Dreamboat (1952) as Clifton Webb's fencing instructor
- Son of Ali Baba (1952) as Fencing coach
- The Mississippi Gambler (1953) as Fencing tech adv.
- The Robe (1953) as Fencing instructor
- Casanova's Big Night (1954) as Supv of dueling scenes
- The Vagabond King (1956) as Technical Advisor

=== Television ===
- Zorro (1957)
- The Adventures of Hiram Holliday (1956)
