= Hollywood Greats =

BBC Television series

- Written by: Barry Norman
- Narrated by: Barry Norman
- No. of series: 4
- No. of episodes: 20

Original release
- Network: BBC
- Release: 1977 – 1985

Hollywood Greats is a British biographic series, which originally ran from 1977 to 1985. The film critic Barry Norman wrote and narrated a series of in-depth profiles on major Hollywood film personalities, in which he interviewed surviving associates. He was also responsible for a series called British Greats in 1980. A series of books, titled The Hollywood Greats, The Movie Greats and The Film Greats, which were written by Norman, were published.

A series with the same title was narrated by Ian McShane in 1999 and presented by Jonathan Ross from 2002 to 2007.

== Barry Norman series ==
=== Series One (1977) ===
- Clark Gable (1901–1960)
- Errol Flynn (1909–1959)
- Spencer Tracy (1900–1967)
- Gary Cooper (1901–1961)
- Humphrey Bogart (1899–1957)

=== Series Two (1978) ===
- Joan Crawford (1904–1977)
- Ronald Colman (1891–1958)
- Jean Harlow (1911–1937)
- Judy Garland (1922–1969)
- Charles Laughton (1899–1962)

=== Series Three (1979) ===
- Edward G. Robinson (1893–1973)
- Groucho Marx (1890–1977)
- Charlie Chaplin (1889–1977)
- Marilyn Monroe (1926–1962)
- Hollywood – The Golden Years

=== Series Four (1984–1985) ===
- John Wayne (1907–1979)
- Henry Fonda (1905–1982)
- Steve McQueen (1930–1980)
- David Niven (1910–1983)
- Bing Crosby (1903–1977)

== 1999–2007 series ==
The first series was narrated by Ian McShane, the rest were presented by Jonathan Ross. The programme dedicated to Audrey Hepburn was broadcast two months before the following series. The details on the BBC website do not match the series number given here.

=== Series One (1999) ===
- Cary Grant (1904–1986)
- Bette Davis (1908–1989)
- Robert Mitchum (1917–1997)
- Katharine Hepburn (1907–2003)

=== Special (2001) ===
- Audrey Hepburn (1929–1993)

=== Series Two (2001) ===
- Judy Garland (1922–1969)
- Gene Kelly (1912–1996)
- Sammy Davis Jr. (1925–1990)

=== Series Three (2002) ===
- Steve McQueen (1930–1980)
- Doris Day (1922–2019)
- Tony Curtis (1925–2010)
- Burt Lancaster (1913–1994)

=== Series Four (2003) ===
- Michael Caine (born 1933)
- Kirk Douglas (1916-2020)
- James Stewart (1908–1997)

=== Series Five ===
- Dustin Hoffman (born 1937)
- Richard Harris (1930–2002)
- John Wayne (1907–1979)
- Anthony Hopkins (born 1937)

=== Series Six (2005) ===
- Tom Cruise (born 1962)
- Lauren Bacall (1924–2014)
- Jane Fonda (born 1937)
- David Niven (1910–1983)

=== Series Seven (2006) ===
- Harrison Ford (born 1942)
- Jack Lemmon (1925–2001)
- Marlon Brando (1924–2004)

=== Special (2007) ===
- Dame Helen Mirren (born 1945)
