= The Last Flight of Noah's Ark =

1980 film by Charles Jarrott

- film poster by Dan Goozee
- Directed by: Charles Jarrott
- Written by: Steven W. Carabatsos; Sandy Glass; George Arthur Bloom
- Based on: "The Gremlin's Castle" by Ernest K. Gann
- Produced by: Ron Miller; Jan Williams
- Starring: Elliott Gould; Geneviève Bujold; Ricky Schroder
- Cinematography: Charles F. Wheeler
- Edited by: Gordon D. Brenner
- Music by: Maurice Jarre
- Production company: Walt Disney Productions
- Distributed by: Buena Vista Distribution
- Release date: July 9, 1980 (Los Angeles)
- Running time: 98 minutes
- Country: United States
- Language: English
- Budget: $6-8 million
- Box office: $11 million

The Last Flight of Noah's Ark is a 1980 American family adventure film produced by Walt Disney Productions starring Elliott Gould, Geneviève Bujold and Ricky Schroder. The film was released by Buena Vista Distribution on July 9, 1980. A full-scale Boeing B-29 Superfortress bomber was featured in the film as the "ark".

== Plot ==
A jaded pilot named Noah Dugan is unemployed and owes a large amount of money due to his gambling. He goes to an old friend, Stoney, who owns an airfield. He is offered a job flying a cargo of animals to a remote South Pacific island aboard a B-29 bomber, a large plane well past its prime. (Note: Boeing B-29 Superfortress bombers bore the brunt of U.S. bombing raids against Japan decades earlier during World War II.) Bernadette "Bernie" Lafleur is the primary missionary who accompanies him, although they initially dislike each other. Bernie has raised the animals at an orphanage and is close to two of the orphans, Julie and Bobby, who resents Dugan after seeing him mistreat one of the animals.

As the aircraft prepares to taxi for takeoff, Bobby is concerned about Dugan's treatment of the animals, and decides to stow away aboard the bomber so that he can make sure they are properly cared for. Julie follows Bobby aboard. During the flight, the bomber goes off course, and, running low on fuel, Dugan is forced to crash-land on an uncharted island that Bobby spotted. While on the island, the group meets two elderly Japanese holdout sailors who have lived there alone for 35 years. Dugan is suspicious of them, as the sailors are unaware that World War II is over, but Bernie wins their friendship and trust. She learns that one of them is named "Cleveland", after the American city by his mother, who had spent time in America before the war and taught him English, allowing the two groups to communicate.

The sailors convince Dugan and Bernie that there is no hope of rescue should they stay on the island, as the two had been there for decades with no one coming to repatriate them. They propose a plan to turn the old aircraft into a boat to sail back to civilization. This requires flipping the B-29 upside down, as this will be a more stable and watertight configuration, and sewing a sail for propulsion, which Bernie volunteers to do. The Japanese sailors give her their battle flag of the Japanese Empire, which she uses as the primary fabric for the sail.

As they work on the plane, Dugan and Bernie begin to warm up to each other and fall in love. Bernie paints the name "Noah's Ark" on the converted aircraft, after Dugan's first name, much to his chagrin, though he eventually accepts it. At Bobby's insistence, the animals are brought aboard, and "Noah's Ark" and its crew set sail. After many days at sea with no civilization in sight, Bernie, inspired by the story of Noah's Ark and the dove which returned with an olive branch, suggests sending a duck with message attached, telling of their need for rescue. However the duck flies westward, away from the direction of Hawaii, and hope dwindles. Bobby falls overboard while trying to fish, but Dugan, who has formed a bond with him, saves the boy from a large shark circling the boat. Eventually, they are rescued by United States Coast Guard Cutter Mellon, which has the duck aboard, and the Ark is towed to Oahu.

== Cast ==
- Elliott Gould as Noah Dugan
- Geneviève Bujold as Bernadette Lafleur
- Ricky Schroder as Bobby
- Vincent Gardenia as "Stoney" Stone
- Tammy Lauren as Julie (Note: Tammy Lauren was director Charles Jarrott's stepdaughter.)
- John Fujioka as "Cleveland"
- Yuki Shimoda as Hiro
- Dana Elcar as Benchley
- John P. Ryan as Coslough
- Ruth Manning as Charlotte Braithwaite
- Arthur Adams as Leipzig Manager
- Austin Willis as Slabotsky
- Peter Renaday as Irate Pilot
- Bob Whiting as Chaplain

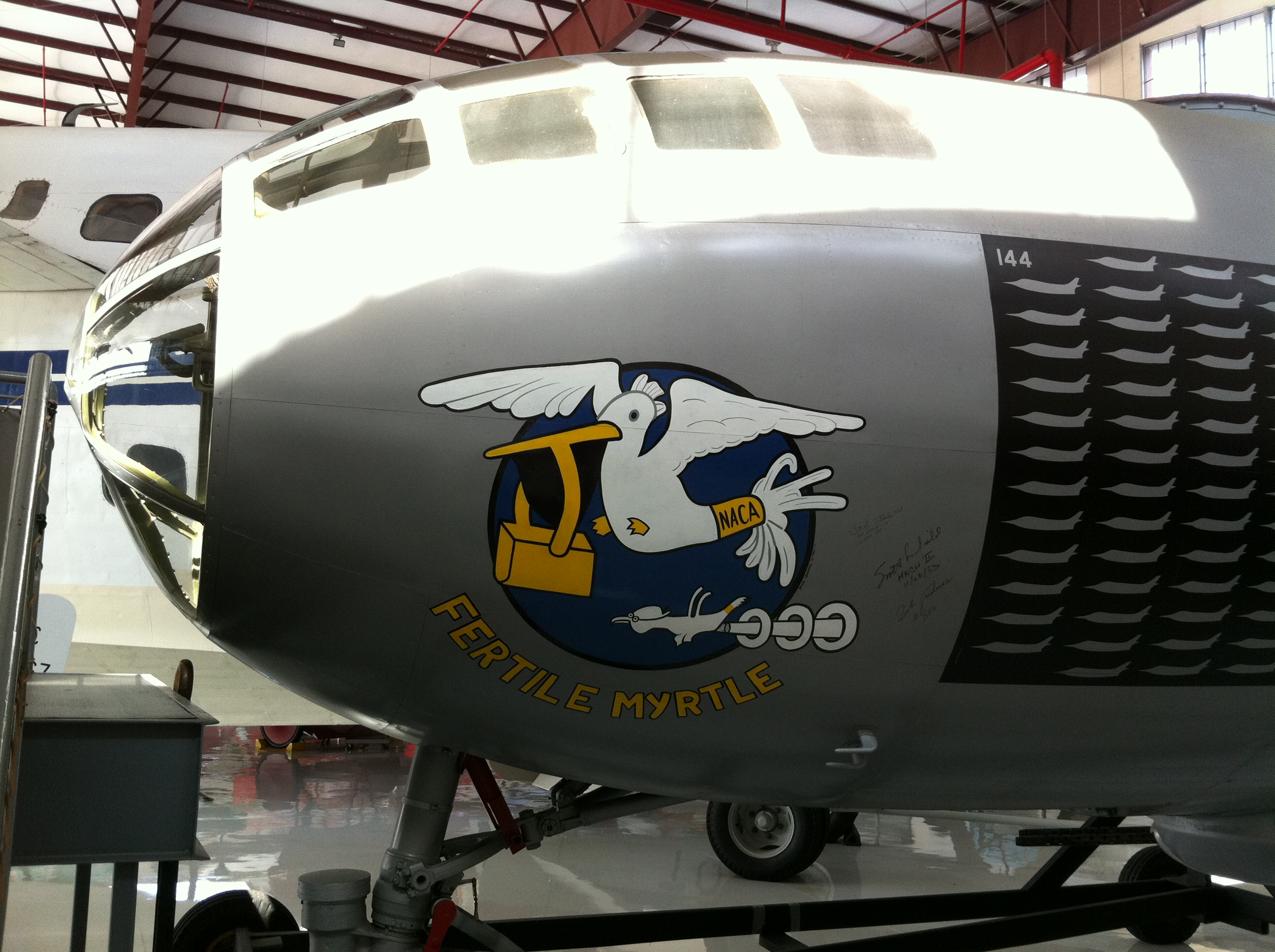
P2B-1S, Bureau Number 84029, Fertile Myrtle's forward fuselage now on display at Fantasy of Flight, Florida

== Production ==
The main story for the film, "The Gremlin's Castle", was written by Ernest K. Gann, who also wrote the aviation novels The High and the Mighty and Fate Is the Hunter, which were also turned into films.

The film was announced in December 1978 as part of Disney's slate of films for the next year. Others included The Watcher in the Woods, Condorman, The Black Hole, and Herbie Goes Bananas.

Ron Miller, head of Disney at the time, deliberately used a director and actors who had not worked with Disney before. "We've got to broaden our base", said producer Dan Miller.

This film reunites director Charles Jarrott with several people he worked with in other films at other studios; he had previously directed Geneviève Bujold in Universal's Anne of the Thousand Days, which had earned them Academy Award nominations. The film's theme song, "Half of Me", had lyrics by Hal David, who also wrote the lyrics to songs to the 1973 Columbia Pictures movie musical Lost Horizon and whose brother Mack David did the same for Walt Disney's 1950 animated feature Cinderella. Meanwhile, both Gould and Bujold were making their first film for Disney, as were Ricky Schroder and Dana Elcar who both appeared in The Champ, which came out on April 4, shortly before this film started shooting on April 22, 1979. Elcar would also appear in Jarrott's next film, Condorman, another Disney release the following year. Schroder, for whom this was also his first film that wasn't a remake of an earlier film, turned nine years old on April 13, exactly nine days between the two aforementioned dates in either direction.

Location photography included scenes at a desert airfield near Victorville, California, Kauai and Waikiki Beach, Hawaii, with interiors shot at the Disney Studios sound stages. The scrapped airframes from four B-29 aircraft that were located at the US Navy's China Lake Facilities were used. Two of the scrapped aircraft were used in Hawaii, while the other two were shipped to the Burbank studio for interiors. Extensive modifications were made in order to have a fuselage that could float. After filming, all the aircraft remains had to be returned to the US Navy. One additional aircraft, the former US Navy P2B-1S long-range-search version of the B-29 Superfortress, named Fertile Myrtle, actually flew in the film.

== Reception ==
The Last Flight of Noah's Ark was released to many drive-in theaters on a double bill with One Hundred and One Dalmatians. The film's promotional slogan was "treat your family to a Disney summer".

Among the reactions from critics, Roger Ebert's 1.5-star review was particularly harsh: "Walt Disney's 'The Last Flight of Noah's Ark' is a dreadful movie, bankrupt of creative imagination—an Identi-kit film, assembled from familiar pieces but with no identity of its own. It's so depressingly predictable that in the last half hour we're sitting there thinking: Let's see…the raft has put out to sea, so there has to be at least one shark attack and one bad storm before they're rescued. There are." Janet Maslin of The New York Times called it "a so-so Disney picture" that was "dull, but inoffensive, except during its infrequent musical interludes." Gene Siskel of the Chicago Tribune gave the film 1 star out of four and wrote, "The inescapable conclusion to be drawn from watching the latest Disney comic adventure film, 'The Last Flight of Noah's Ark,' is that Walt Disney productions had no conception of whom they were making this film for. It's a very bad film that falls in the gap between a kiddie show and adult entertainment." Variety derisively wrote that the film teaches "fundamental values, mainly that every human being should be willing to risk their life for an animal, or even a chicken if the chance arises", and "stresses a subsidiary hint for the little ones: If you don't get your way, whine and cry a lot and maybe the old folks will give in." Charles Champlin of the Los Angeles Times was generally positive, declaring that the film "is in most ways the smooth and satisfying family film out of the Disney past, with cute kids (who are at least as smart as the grown-ups) and a dazzling gimmick at the center of the story." Gary Arnold of The Washington Post wrote, "A low-octane adventure fable, 'Last Flight' keeps sputtering out on the stodgy, overprotective mechanics typical of Disney juvenile entertainment."

Leonard Maltin's home video guide gave it 2.5 stars out of 4 and noted: "Typical Disney sentimentality; somewhat effective."

The film was a box office disappointment. Miller called it a "$6 million write-off."

== See also ==
- The Flight of the Phoenix
- List of surviving Boeing B-29 Superfortresses

== Bibliography ==
- O'Leary, Michael. "The Last Flight of Noah's Ark". Air Classics, Volume 16, Number 4, April 1980.
