= John Fluke =

American electrical engineer (1911–1984)

John Maurice Fluke, Sr.
- Born: December 14, 1911; Tacoma, Washington, US
- Died: February 11, 1984 (aged 72)
- Burial place: Vendovi Island
- Education: University of Washington (BS); MIT (MS)
- Spouse: Lyla Schram (married 1937)
- Children: 3
- Military career
- Allegiance: United States
- Branch: US Navy
- Service years: 1940–1946
- Rank: Commander
- Awards: Legion of Merit
- Other work: Founder of Fluke Corporation

John Maurice Fluke, Sr. (December 14, 1911 – February 11, 1984) was the founder of Fluke Corporation, a United States Navy commander, and electrical engineer.

== Early life ==
Fluke was born in Tacoma, Washington, to German immigrants Jefferson Lee Fluke and Lynda Fluke-Hampton. He had one brother, Jefferson Mori Fluke, born in 1915. Fluke's father died in 1916 from appendicitis.

Fluke went to Stadium High School in Tacoma and graduated in 1928. In elementary school, he became interested in electric trains made by General Electric for Milwaukie Railroad, which influenced his decision to become an electrical engineer. Fluke began attending the University of Washington in 1930, earning a Bachelor of Science in electrical engineering in 1935. During his time at UW, he was a member of the Naval Reserve Officers Training Corps and was commissioned as an ensign in the reserve. In 1936 he earned a Master of Science in electrical engineering from MIT.

After graduating, he was hired by General Electric and moved to Schenectady, New York. There he became friends with HP co-founder David Packard.

In 1937 he married Lyla Schram, whom he met at UW. Together they had three children.

In 1941, Fluke was called to serve in the United States Navy to work on shipboard electrical problems with Hyman Rickover. During his service, Fluke was promoted to commander, and received the Legion of Merit for his work. He was discharged in 1946, and declined offers from the Navy and General Electric to pursue a private engineering practice.

== Fluke Corporation ==
In 1948, he founded the Fluke Corporation in his basement in Springdale, Connecticut. The company was originally called John Fluke Engineering Co., and had only two other employees. Their first product was a multimeter, and their first customer was General Electric.

In 1952, Fluke decided to move his business to Seattle to "move back home". Packard encouraged him to move to Stanford, and called Seattle an "intellectual vacuum". Fluke Corporation moved from Seattle to Montlake Terrace, and finally to Everett.

== Later life and death ==
Fluke purchased Vendovi Island in 1965, where he built a house and other buildings. The island was sold to the San Juan Preservation Trust in 2010.

In 1969, Fluke was appointed to a blue-ribbon panel commissioned by Defense Secretary Melvin Laird, to "study the entire organization, structure, and operation of the Department of Defense".

Fluke, and later his family, would contribute money to multiple institutions, including the University of Washington, Junior Achievement, Stanford University, and the Seattle Symphony Orchestra. In 1988, with funds donated by Fluke, the University of Washington built the Washington Technology Center, and named it Fluke Hall in his honor.

On February 11, 1984, Fluke died of heart problems at the age of 72. He was buried in a small cemetery on Vendovi Island.
