= Mar (boat) =

Sailing tour boat based in Halifax, Nova Scotia

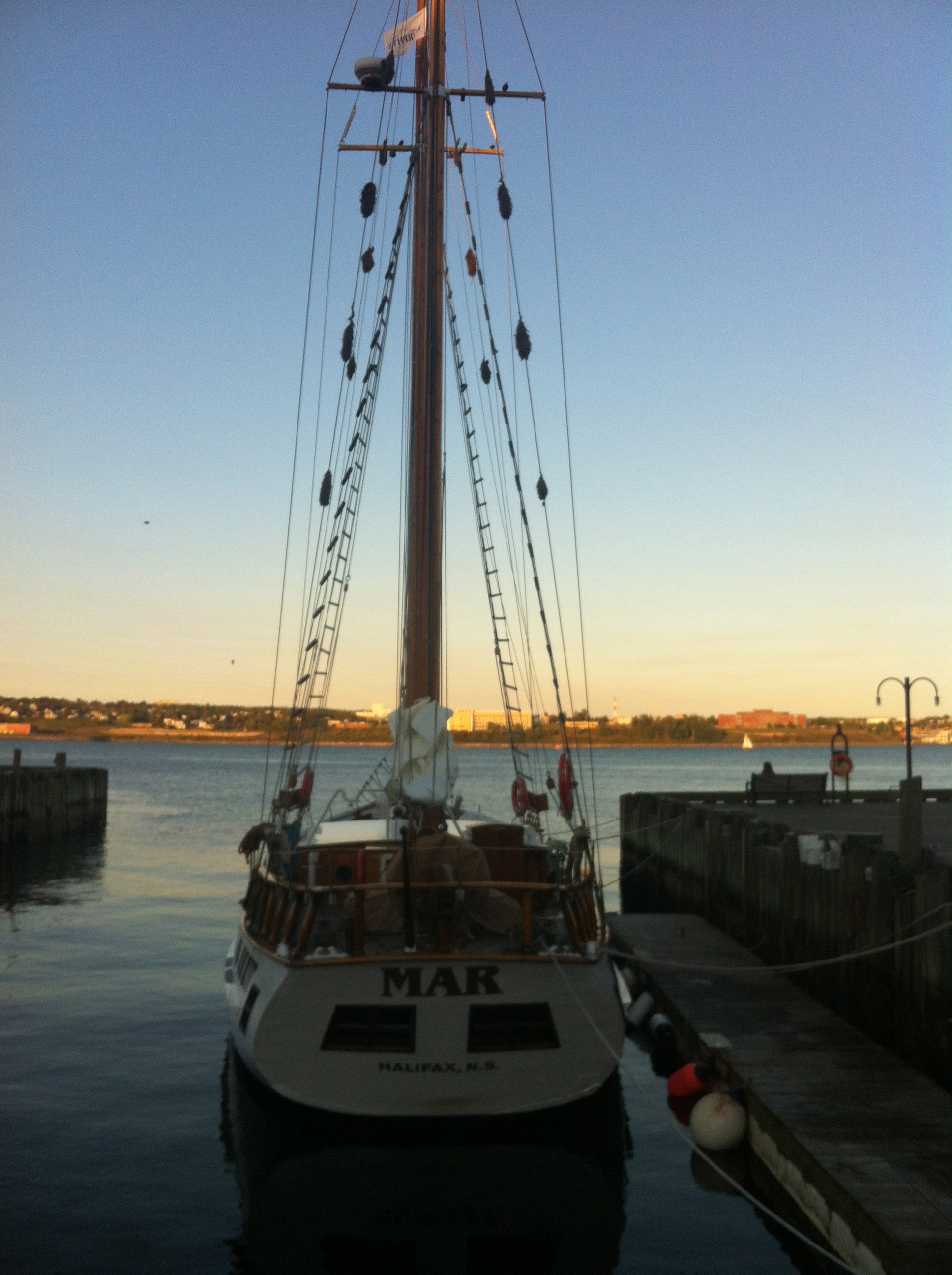
- The Mar in Halifax, Nova Scotia

History

Canada
- Name: Mar
- Ordered: 1957
- Builder: Frederikssund Boatbuilding, Frederikssund, Denmark
- Laid down: 1957
- Launched: 1959
- Home port: Halifax, Nova Scotia
- Status: Active

General characteristics
- Class & type: Sailing Vessel, Ketch
- Length: 17.47 m (57.3 ft)
- Beam: 5.49 m (18.0 ft)
- Draught: 2.9 m (9 ft 6 in)
- Propulsion: 1 x 120HP Single Screw Diesel Engine
- Speed: 10 kn (19 km/h; 12 mph)

Mar is a sailing tour boat based out of Halifax, Nova Scotia and known for its literary and film associations. Mar was built starting in 1957 and launched in 1959 at Frederikssund Boatbulding in Frederikssund, Denmark. She was built for author Ernest K. Gann, author of several works including "Song of the Sirens", "Twilight of the Gods" and "The High and the Mighty". She was then bought by Charles Tobias owner of Pusser's Rum Company and he used her in the filming of the 1976 film The Way of the Wind. The Mar was then purchased by Mar II Sailing Tours Ltd. based out of Halifax, Nova Scotia in 1982 and she has been sailing there ever since, with the exception of some seven-day sailing excursions around the Caribbean in the 1980s. The Mar has not only sailed to the Caribbean, she has sailed extensively around the tropics and also to the Arctic. She has a sturdy design which has also allowed her to complete two circumnavigations of the globe when owned by Charles Tobias.

== General characteristics ==
She is a traditional wooden ketch constructed of teak, oak and mahogany. She has one auxiliary diesel-fueled engine with a maximum speed of 10 knots. She is 17.47 meters long (23.16m with bowsprit), 5.49 meters wide and draws 2.9 meters.

== Notable passengers ==
Ernest K. Gann - Author

Charles Tobias - Pusser's Rum Company

Iggy Pop -Musician

2012-2013 Toronto Raptors Basketball Team

Hughie Lewis, in the 1980s while on tour in Halifax

The Irish rovers in 2016
