= Dodie Post =

Olympic skier

Personal information
- Born: September 10, 1922
- Died: December 24, 2012 (age 90) Friday Harbor, WA

Skiing career
- Sport: Alpine skiing
- Club: Reno Ski Club

Olympics
- Teams: 1948, 1952

World Championships
- Teams: 1950

Doris Barbara “Dodie” Post Gann (1922–2012) was an alpine skier in the 1948 and 1952 Winter Olympics. Post later became an accomplished sailor and conservationist with her husband, author and screenwriter Ernest K. Gann.

== Ski racing ==
Post was a member of the Reno Ski Club while growing up in Reno, Nevada and attending the University of Nevada, Reno. Post was selected as captain of the 1948 U.S. Olympic Woman's Ski Team for the San Moritz, Switzerland Olympics. However, she was unable to compete due to a broken ankle. In 1950, Post was made captain of the FIS World Championship's ski team in Chile. She competed in the 1952 Olympics in Oslo, Norway. For the 1956 Olympics in Cortina, Italy, Post served on the ski team selection committee and as team manager.

== Sailing ==
Post met author Ernest K. Gann while he was skiing in Lake Tahoe. Gann invited Post to help sail Albatros from Holland, through the Panama Canal, to its new home in the San Francisco Bay. Post and Gann married and spent three years sailing the Albatros throughout the South Pacific. The Albatros was used in the movie Twilight for the Gods based on Gann's novel. It was later sold to a sailing school and sank in the Gulf of Mexico, after encountering a severe storm. The 1996 movie White Squall, starring Jeff Bridges, depicts the saga. Post and Gann moved to San Juan Island in the state of Washington, where their yachting continued for the remainder of their lives.

== Conservationism ==
Post and Gann made the first donation to the San Juan Preservation Trust in 1980, by donating 38 acres of their Red Mill Farm to the trust. Post served as either a trust board member or an emeritus adviser for the remainder of her life. After Post's death in 2012, the remaining 738 acres were donated to the trust as a working agricultural preserve. A life-long dog lover, Post was also a founding member of the Animal Protection Society of Friday Harbor.

== Death and honors ==
Post died in Friday Harbor, Washington on December 24, 2012.

Post was elected to the University of Nevada Athletic Hall of Fame in 1973. Post was elected to the US Ski Team Hall of Fame in 2001. The annual "Dodie Gann Memorial Dog Walk" is held each year in Friday Harbor.
