= Island in the Sky (1953 film) =

1953 film by William A. Wellman

- Theatrical release poster
- Directed by: William Wellman
- Based on: Island in the Sky; 1944 novel by Ernest K. Gann
- Produced by: Robert Fellows; John Wayne
- Starring: John Wayne; Lloyd Nolan; Walter Abel; James Arness; Andy Devine
- Narrated by: William Wellman
- Cinematography: Archie Stout
- Edited by: Ralph Dawson
- Music by: Emil Newman
- Production company: Wayne-Fellows Productions
- Distributed by: Warner Bros. Pictures
- Release date: September 3, 1953 (US)
- Running time: 109 minutes
- Country: United States
- Language: English
- Budget: $967,000 (estimated)
- Box office: $2.75 million (US)

Island in the Sky is a 1953 American aviation adventure drama film written by Ernest K. Gann based on his 1944 novel of the same name, directed by William A. Wellman and starring and coproduced by John Wayne. Because of its realistic depiction of an actual aircraft crash, some consider the film as among the classic aviation films. The film also features Andy Devine, Lloyd Nolan, James Arness and Paul Fix.

== Plot ==
Pilot John Dooley and the crew of a World War II-era Douglas C-47 Skytrain (the military version of the DC-3) experience icy conditions and are forced to execute an emergency landing on a frozen lake in the uncharted wildlands near the Quebec–Labrador border. Dooley is a former airline pilot who had been pressed into duty hauling war supplies across the northern route to England. Far from settled country, the survivors can provide only an approximate position to rescuers.

Dooley must keep his men alive while waiting for rescue in the extreme winter cold with temperatures plummeting to −70 °F (−57 °C). At headquarters, Col. Fuller gathers fellow airmen who are determined to find the downed crew before the men succumb to hunger and the cold. The search pilots experience tension and fear and are unsure about their course of action, aware that a wrong decision could doom the missing crew.

== Cast ==
- John Wayne as Captain Dooley
- Lloyd Nolan as Captain Stutz
- Walter Abel as Colonel Fuller
- James Arness as Mac McMullen, pilot
- Andy Devine as Willie Moon, pilot
- Allyn Joslyn as J. H. Handy
- Jimmy Lydon as Murray
- Harry Carey, Jr. as Ralph Hunt, Moon's co-pilot
- Hal Baylor as Stankowski
- Sean McClory as Frank Lovatt, Dooley's co-pilot
- Wally Cassell as D'Annunzia
- Gordon Jones as Walrus
- Frank Fenton as Captain Turner
- Robert Keys as Major Ditson
- Sumner Getchell as Lieutenant Cord
- Regis Toomey as Sergeant Harper
- Paul Fix as Wally Miller
- Jim Dugan as Gidley
- George Chandler as Rene
- Louis Jean Heydt as Fitch, pilot
- Bob Steele as Wilson
- Darryl Hickman as Swanson, McMullen's radioman
- Mike Connors (billed as Touch Connors) as Gainer
- Carl Switzer as Sonny Harper, Stutz's co-pilot
- Cass Gidley as Stannish
- Herbert Anderson (as Guy Anderson) as Breezy
- Tony De Mario as Ogden
- Fess Parker as Fitch's co-pilot (uncredited)
- John Indrisano as Mechanic (uncredited)
- Dawn Bender as Murray's Wife (uncredited)
- Ann Doran as Moon's Wife (uncredited)
- Ed Fury as Server in Officer's Mess (uncredited)
- William Wellman as voiceover narrator (uncredited)

== Production ==
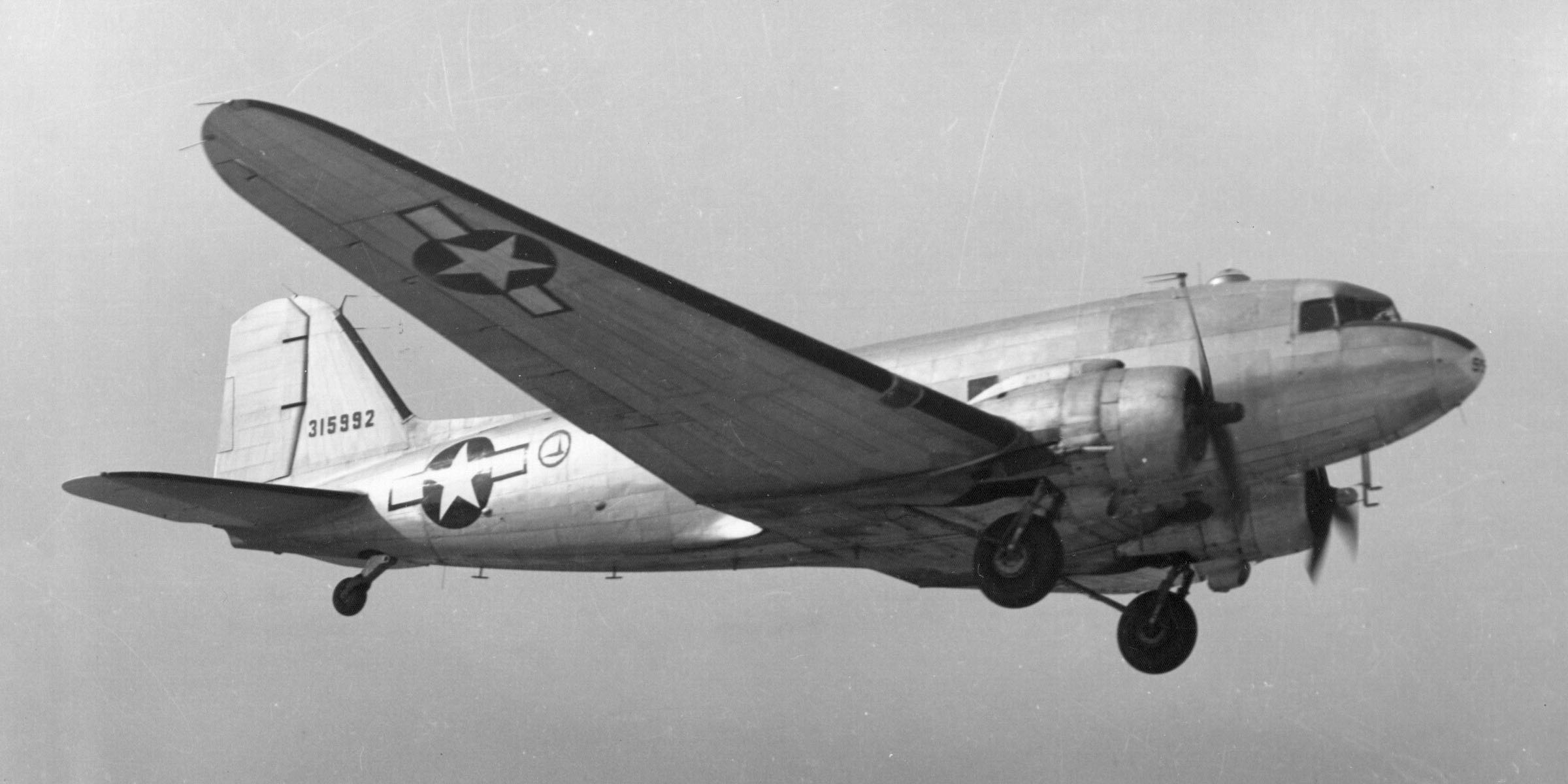
A Douglas C-47, a type featured in the film

The script was based on a true story about a flight on February 3, 1943, although its copilot was not killed as in the film. In his autobiography Fate Is the Hunter, on which the film of the same name is very loosely based, writer Ernest K. Gann related the true story and his role as one of the search pilots while serving with Air Transport Command at Presque Isle Airfield, Maine. Gann had been scheduled to fly the mission that ran into trouble, but was bumped from the flight by a more senior pilot.

The rights to the story were originally bought in January 1950 by Robert Stillman Productions, and Gann planned to write the screenplay with Seton I. Miller. Frank Rosenberg was scheduled to produce the film, which would star Richard Widmark. When Stillman dropped the film, the rights were picked up in December 1952 by Wayne-Fellows Productions, the partnership of John Wayne and Robert Fellows, as their third of seven eventual productions, including the following year's Gann story The High and the Mighty, also starring Wayne. The two films shared many of the same production staff and crew members, including director William Wellman.

Wellman had been a pilot with the Lafayette Flying Corps during World War I, where he earned the nickname Wild Bill, and with the United States Army Air Service after the war. He was a veteran aviation film director whose Wings won the first Academy Award (1927–1928). Wellman provides the voiceover narration that begins the film, and his two sons Tim and Mike, who were eleven and five at the time, play Andy Devine's sons. The women in the film, Ann Doran, Dawn Bender and Phyllis Winger, appear only in brief flashbacks and in a telephone conversation. The lack of a romantic interest was noted by critics, who considered the film a more authentic and gritty drama as compared to the usual Hollywood war pictures. Wellman had an adversarial relationship with actors and was known to prefer to work with men; many of his films are set in predominantly male worlds.

The role played by Wayne in Island in the Sky goes against type, as he does not display the machismo for which he was often criticized. His portrayal of the downed aircraft's captain had been noted as believable and realistic. A strong ensemble cast of mainly studio B-actors contained a number of future stars, including Fess Parker, James Arness, Darryl Hickman and Mike Connors, all of whom would realize television fame. The black-and-white cinematography by Archie Stout (dramatic scenes) and William H. Clothier (flying scenes) has been praised by critics.

Production began in late January 1953 and was completed on March 2. Filming took place partly at Donner Lake, near Truckee, California in the Sierra Nevada range. The California Department of Forestry felled trees in the area in order that aircraft runways could be fashioned in the four-foot-deep snow. Some background shooting also took place in San Francisco. In addition to writing the screenplay, Gann, a commercial pilot for Transocean Air Lines, served as the film's technical director and also piloted a C-47 for the second unit.

The hand-cranked emergency radio transmitter used by the crew members to try to contact rescuers was an actual piece of equipment, a BC-778/SCR-578/AN-CRT3 emergency transmitter, affectionately called Gibson Girl after the 1890s drawings of Charles Dana Gibson. The narrow-waisted shape of the device allowed the operator to hold it between the legs while cranking it—a necessity because it required 80 rpm and was difficult to crank.

=== Similarities to The High and the Mighty ===
Island in the Sky and The High and the Mighty, released the following year, are two of the earliest all-star disaster films, paving the way for Airport and its sequels more than 20 years later, as well as the Airplane! parodies. The two films are among Wayne's early co-productions in which he starred. This practice would not become widespread until the 1980s and 1990s when many stars assumed control of productions. Both films were aviation dramas and shared many of the same crew members and production staff.

Along with Wayne, six actors appeared in both films: Regis Toomey, Paul Fix, Carl "Alfalfa" Switzer, Ann Doran, George Chandler and Michael Wellman (the director's son). Gann wrote both screenplays.

== Release ==
Island in the Sky premiered in Los Angeles on September 3, 1953, and entered general release two days later. The premiere showing featured stereophonic sound, but an intermission period was necessitated because of problems with it.

== Reception ==
In a contemporary review for The New York Times, critic Howard Thompson wrote:

Whenever the action of this erratic and unsurprising Warner presentation is permitted to speak for itself, it vibrates with pictorial and muscular conviction. But if Mr. Gann is primarily bent, as it appears, on stressing man's perennial displacement by hostile natural elements, the camera stays three jumps ahead of him. Indeed, the stark, gleaming vastness of the backgrounds minimizes the pretentious camouflaging of a simple, perfectly legitimate story idea, including the characters, some high-flying dialogue and whatever Mr. Gann is actually driving at. ... On the whole, 'Island in the Sky' remains a standard reply to an extraordinarily simple challenge.

== Home media ==
Both Island in the Sky and The High and the Mighty were out of circulation for about 20 years because of legal issues. They were restored, returned to television in July 2005 and released as special edition DVDs that August.

== See also ==
- John Wayne filmography
- Island hopping
- Survival
