= Slonnie Sloniger =

American aviation pioneer (1896–1969)

Eyer L. Sloniger
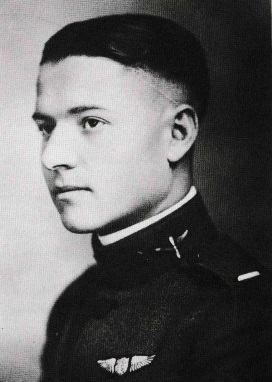
- Sloniger during World War I
- Born: July 28, 1896; Moorefield, Nebraska, U.S.
- Died: August 15, 1969 (aged 73); San Mateo, California, U.S.
- Other name: "Old number one"
- Occupation: Pilot
- Employer: American Airlines
- Spouse: Katherine Everett
- Children: 1
- Military career
- Allegiance: United States
- Branch: United States Army Air Service
- Service years: 1917–1919
- Rank: 2nd Lieutenant
- Unit: 110th Aero Squadron
- Conflicts: World War I

Eyer L. "Slonnie" Sloniger (Note: The "L." in his name was an initial only.) (July 28, 1896 – August 15, 1969) was an American pilot, notably the first chief pilot and holder of pilot seniority no. 1 at American Airlines. He later became chief pilot and director of flight operations at Matson Airlines.

== Early years ==
Eyir Sloniger was born to Commodore and Margaret Sloniger on July 28, 1896, on a farm outside of Moorefield, Nebraska. (Commodore was a birth name, not a rank) Eyir was the middle child of nine siblings, six boys and three girls. Eyir was not given a middle name at birth, but liked the sound of "E.L." and decided to use the initial "L" as his middle name. The Slonigers moved to Lincoln, Nebraska where Sloniger became an Eagle Scout, finished high school, and enrolled at the University of Nebraska. World War I broke out while Sloniger was attending college, impelling him to drop out of school and join the war effort. The Army misspelled his name as "Eyer", which led to the final iteration of his name "Eyer L. Sloniger".

== World War I ==
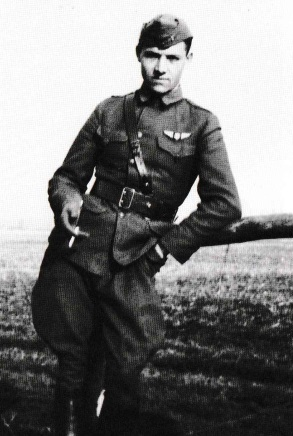
Sloniger at Issoudun Aerodrome in France, WWI

Sloniger joined the United States Army Air Service on November 7, 1917 and was sent to the University of California, Berkeley for officers training. He was then assigned to the 110th Aero Squadron at Kelly Field in San Antonio, Texas for his flight training. After earning his wings, he was shipped out to the Issoudun Aerodrome in France where he flew Nieuport and SPAD pursuit planes. Sloniger was learning to fly his assigned patrol route with instructors when the war ended. He was four days shy of being sent to the front. Sloniger was released from active duty on February 9, 1919.

== Barnstorming and early airmail ==
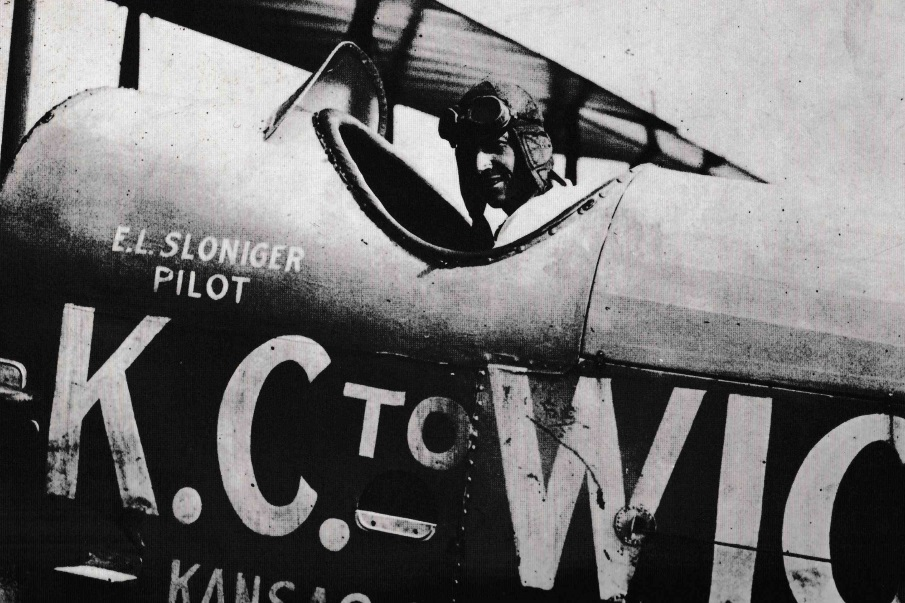
Airmail pilot E.L. Sloniger

After the war, Sloniger returned to Lincoln and purchased a surplus Jenny airplane. Sloniger would give airplane rides, put on aerobatic shows, and give flight instruction in order to help finish college. Lincoln businessman Ray Page, owner of the Lincoln-Page Aircraft Company, operated a flying circus named "Page's Ariel Pageant". Sloniger was one of the headline acts with his aerobatic routine. He then spent time flying the Tampico Oil Company payroll, in the form of cash and gold bars, from the US to Mexico. In 1925, Sloniger flew for the short lived "Kansas City to Wichita Airlines".

In 1927, Sloniger was hired at Robertson Aircraft Corporation flying the CAM 2 mail route from St. Louis - Peoria - Springfield and back. Charles Lindbergh was a pilot for Robertson prior to his famous New York to Paris non-stop flight and considered Sloniger as one of his favorite fellow airmail pilots. Lindbergh was also a member of Sloniger's old squadron, the renamed 110th Observation Squadron now based in St Louis, Missouri.

== Airline career ==
=== American Airlines ===
When American Airlines was created in 1930, it was done so by consolidating many smaller airlines. One of those airlines was Robertson where Sloniger was the senior pilot. When American created their combined pilot seniority list, Sloniger came out as pilot no. 1. This earned him the nickname of "Old number one". The Air Mail scandal of 1934 mandated that the airlines reorganize into new, more efficient organizations, which led to Sloniger being named American's first chief pilot.

During World War II, many pilots and aircraft from American Airlines were absorbed into the Air Transport Command of the United States Army Air Forces to assist with the war effort. Before the war, American had been a domestic airline only, and Sloniger volunteered for the chance to fly international flights to Europe. He made 88 Atlantic crossings during the war. After the war ended, American returned to its pre-war route structure of domestic flights only.

=== Matson Airlines ===
Matson Navigation Company decided to start up a luxury airline serving Hawaii in an attempt to break up Pan Am's international route monopoly. Matson offered Sloniger the job of chief pilot and director of operation for the new airline. Intrigued by the opportunity to fly international routes again, Sloniger resigned from American and took the job at Matson. Fellow American pilot and author, Ernest Gann joined him at Matson. Gann wrote about their maiden flight to Honolulu in his memoir Fate is the Hunter with, "My respect for Sloniger was enormous and so I had no objection whatsoever to flying as his co-pilot." Matson eventually ceased operations and Sloniger spent time working for Transocean Air Lines and California Eastern Airways before retiring from the airline industry in 1955.

== Later life and death ==
Sloniger spent the last 25 years of his life living in the San Francisco Bay Area, first in Walnut Creek and then San Mateo. He was a member of the American Airlines retired pilots group the Grey Eagles and the Quiet Birdmen. He enjoyed gardening and growing orchids during his retirement. Sloniger died at home on August 15, 1969, at the age of 73. He was inducted into the Nebraska Aviation Hall of Fame in 2017.
