= Moorefield, Nebraska =

Village in Frontier County, Nebraska, United States

- Village
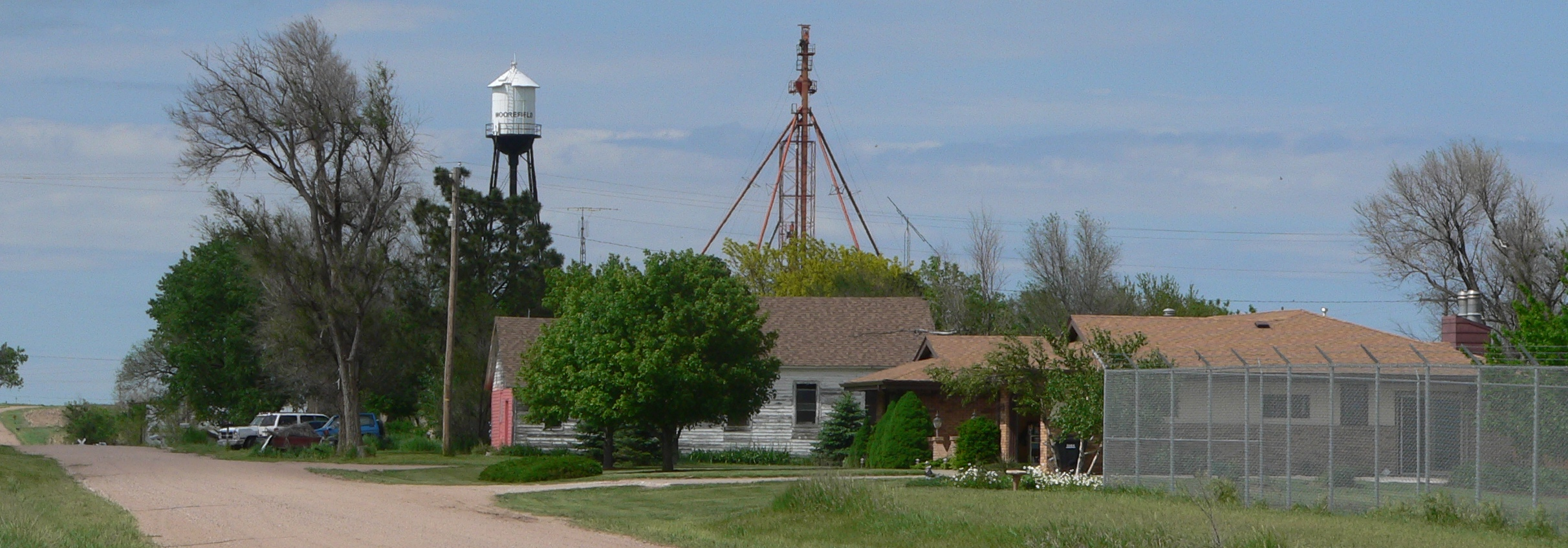
- Moorefield, looking north from Nebraska Highway 23, May 2010

- Location of Moorefield, Nebraska
- Coordinates: 40°41′24″N 100°24′01″W
- Country: United States
- State: Nebraska
- County: Frontier

Area
  - Total: 0.17 sq mi (0.43 km^{2})
  - Land: 0.17 sq mi (0.43 km^{2})
  - Water: 0 sq mi (0.00 km^{2})
- Elevation: 2,832 ft (863 m)

Population (2020)
  - Total: 27
  - Density: 161.4/sq mi (62.31/km^{2})
- Time zone: UTC-6 (Central (CST))
  - Summer (DST): UTC-5 (CDT)
- ZIP code: 69039
- Area code: 308
- FIPS code: 31-32760
- GNIS feature ID: 2399392

Moorefield is a village in Frontier County, Nebraska, United States. As of the 2020 census, Moorefield had a population of 27.

== History ==
First settled in the 1870s, Moorefield became a railroad town in 1886 when the Burlington & Missouri River Railroad extended a line to it. Moorefield was named for the original owner of the town site.

== Geography ==
According to the United States Census Bureau, the village has a total area of 0.17 square miles (0.44 km^{2}), all of it land.

== Demographics ==
Historical population
Census	Pop.	Note	%±
1920	151		—
1930	156		3.3%
1940	97		−37.8%
1950	58		−40.2%
1960	55		−5.2%
1970	56		1.8%
1980	36		−35.7%
1990	52		44.4%
2000	52		0.0%
2010	32		−38.5%
2020	27		−15.6%
U.S. Decennial Census

=== 2010 census ===
As of the census of 2010, there were 32 people, 16 households, and 10 families residing in the village. The population density was 188.2 inhabitants per square mile (72.7/km^{2}). There were 24 housing units at an average density of 141.2 per square mile (54.5/km^{2}). The racial makeup of the village was 100.0% White.

There were 16 households, of which 56.3% were married couples living together, 6.3% had a female householder with no husband present, and 37.5% were non-families. 37.5% of all households were made up of individuals, and 6.3% had someone living alone who was 65 years of age or older. The average household size was 2.00 and the average family size was 2.60.

The median age in the village was 50 years. 3.1% of residents were under the age of 18; 15.6% were between the ages of 18 and 24; 15.6% were from 25 to 44; 59.3% were from 45 to 64; and 6.3% were 65 years of age or older. The gender makeup of the village was 59.4% male and 40.6% female.

=== 2000 census ===
As of the census of 2000, there were 52 people, 19 households, and 14 families residing in the village. The population density was 310.9 inhabitants per square mile (120.0/km^{2}). There were 19 housing units at an average density of 113.6 per square mile (43.9/km^{2}). The racial makeup of the village was 100.00% White.

There were 19 households, out of which 31.6% had children under the age of 18 living with them, 68.4% were married couples living together, and 26.3% were non-families. 26.3% of all households were made up of individuals, and 10.5% had someone living alone who was 65 years of age or older. The average household size was 2.74 and the average family size was 3.36.

In the village, the population was spread out, with 21.2% under the age of 18, 19.2% from 18 to 24, 26.9% from 25 to 44, 15.4% from 45 to 64, and 17.3% who were 65 years of age or older. The median age was 38 years. For every 100 females, there were 136.4 males. For every 100 females age 18 and over, there were 127.8 males.

As of 2000 the median income for a household in the village was $30,833, and the median income for a family was $31,667. Males had a median income of $20,625 versus $21,250 for females. The per capita income for the village was $15,481. None of the population and none of the families were below the poverty line.

== Education ==
It is in the Medicine Valley Public Schools school district.

== Notable people ==
- Slonnie Sloniger (1896-1969), aviation pioneer

== See also ==
- List of municipalities in Nebraska
