= Ernest K. Gann =

American author (1910–1991)

Ernest Gann
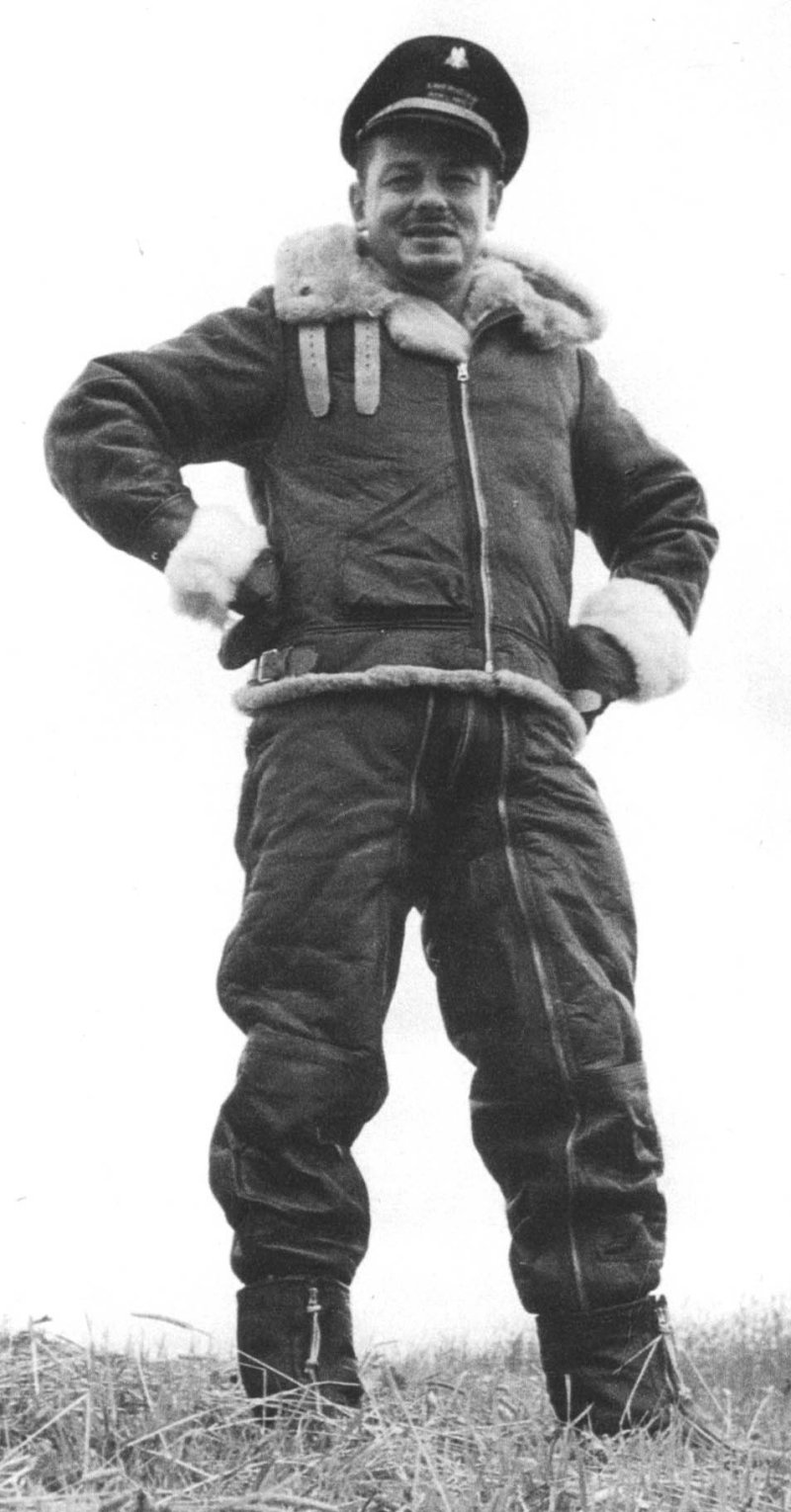
- Born: October 13, 1910; Lincoln, Nebraska, U.S.
- Died: December 19, 1991 (aged 81); Friday Harbor, Washington, U.S.
- Education: Yale University
- Spouse(s): Eleanor Helen Michaud; Doris Barbara "Dodie" Post
- Children: 3
- Writing career
- Genres: Memoirs; Adventure fiction Historical fiction Nautical fiction

Ernest Kellogg Gann (October 13, 1910 – December 19, 1991) was an American aviator, author, sailor, and conservationist. He is best known for his novels and memoirs about early aviation and nautical adventures. Some of his more famous aviation novels include The High and the Mighty and Island in the Sky, both of which were turned into Hollywood movies starring John Wayne. Gann's classic memoir of early commercial aviation, Fate Is the Hunter, is still in print today and considered by many as one of the greatest aviation books ever written. Some of Gann's nautical-themed novels include Fiddler's Green and Soldier of Fortune, which were also turned into major motion pictures.

== Early life ==
Gann was born October 13, 1910, in Lincoln, Nebraska, to George Kellogg Gann (1884–1958) and Caroline May Kupper (1890–1945). George was a telephone-company executive in Lincoln, Nebraska; St. Paul, Minnesota; and Chicago, Illinois.

Rebelling against his father's strong desire that he seek a career with the telephone business, Ernest pursued several other interests as he matured. He was fascinated by topics including photography, movie-making, and aviation. As a young man, he showed little interest in school and performed poorly. His parents decided that he needed discipline and that he should attend a military school. He was sent to the Culver Military Academy for his high school years. Despite many misadventures and struggles with the harsh academic environment and strict rules at Culver, he graduated at age 19 in 1930. He elected to pursue filmmaking, and matriculated with the Yale School of Drama.

After two years at Yale, Gann dropped out to pursue a career on Broadway. His first job was assistant stage manager, and the minor messenger-boy role for Gilbert Miller's play Firebird starring Judith Anderson. After Firebird closed and unable to find work, Gann went home to Chicago to live with his parents. Gann's father stated, "You should see what is going on in the world. I suggest a trip around it." Gann spent the next year traveling and writing to a friend from Chicago, Eleanor Michaud. After Gann returned from his travels, he and Eleanor were married on September 18, 1933, in Chicago.

Gann and Eleanor moved to New York where he found work at Radio City Music Hall as a projectionist and later as a commercial movie cartoonist. A chance encounter on the sidewalks of Broadway landed Gann an interview with Roy Larson, producer of The March of Time, a documentary movie series associated with Time magazine. While working on the documentary Inside Nazi Germany in 1936, Gann fled back to America as Hitler's troops marched into the Rhineland. Once back home, Gann moved to Rockland County where a local airport, Christie Airport, rekindled his interest in aviation. Gann convinced some of his theater friends, Paul Draper and Burgess Meredith, to join him with flight lessons. Draper and Meredith's flying interests tapered off, but Gann thrived in aviation and soon bought a Stinson Reliant which he lost shortly thereafter in a hangar fire. He used the insurance money to purchase his second airplane, a Waco A biplane.

After earning his pilot certificate, Gann spent much of his free time aloft in the Waco A, flying for pleasure. However, the continuing Great Depression soon cost him his job and dried up employment opportunities in New York. Gann sold his house and airplane and relocated his family to Hollywood, California, in search for work in the film industry. While hunting for movie work, Gann found great pleasure in the "honest work" he found in aviation. He worked as a flight instructor and chartered flights for Lewis Air Service at the Burbank Airport and began to write short stories in his down time. Unable to find permanent employment in either the movie industry or the aviation industry, Gann and his family moved back to New York. He was hired as Norman Bel Geddes’ personal assistant which included duties as a pilot. Gann was fired after Bel Geddes' play Siege failed. Gann then found work as the General Manager for Vinton Freedley's Broadway musical Leave It to Me!. Gann was fired in the middle of a play and vowed to leave the theater industry behind for good. Gann sold everything he could, and moved into a rental cottage near Christie Airport determined to find work in aviation.

== Airline career ==
Gann made an acquaintance with George McCabe, American Airlines chief pilot at Newark, and was able to get an interview. Gann was hired in 1938 as First Officer to fly the Douglas DC-2 and Douglas DC-3 aircraft for American Airlines. For several years Gann flew routes in the northeastern United States and had finally found his "life's work". During 1942, many U.S. airlines' pilots and aircraft were absorbed into the Air Transport Command of the United States Army Air Forces to assist with the war effort. Gann and many of his co-workers at American Airlines volunteered to join the group. He flew Douglas DC-3s, Douglas C-47s, Douglas C-54s and Consolidated C-87 Liberator Express transports for the Air Transport Command. Gann was based at Gander, Newfoundland; Goose Bay, Labrador; and Presque Isle, Maine, flying the North Atlantic to Europe with stops at Narsarsuaq Air Base in Greenland and Reykjavík, Iceland. Later, he was also based at Natal, Brazil flying routes in the South Atlantic. These flights would take him from Natal to Ascension Island; Accra, Ghana; Kano, Nigeria; Khartoum, Sudan; Gura, Eritrea; Aden, Yemen; Salalah, Oman; Karachi, India; Gaya, India; and finally to Chabua, India. Chabua is where The Hump airlift flights across the Himalayas and into Kunming, China originated. Flying The Hump at 16,000 ft through Himalayan valleys, Gann found the conditions to be, "simply and truthfully the worst weather in the world." When Gann found down-time during these flights, he continued to write and published Island in the Sky in 1944, a novel about the search-and-rescue of a downed Air Transport Command (ATC) airplane in Labrador, Canada.

At the end of World War II, the Air Transport Command released the civilian pilots and aircraft to their airlines. American Airlines was assigned its pre-war routes, which were domestic routes only. The number-one senior pilot at American Airlines, E.L. "Slonnie" Sloniger, quit American Airlines and became the Chief Pilot at Matson Airlines, a new venture of the Matson Steamship Line. Sloniger recruited Gann, and after years of flying over the oceans to far-away destinations, the idea of flying domestic routes came as a disappointment, so he resigned from American Airlines and accepted Sloniger's offer. Gann flew a triangle route across the Western Pacific between Honolulu, San Francisco, and Los Angeles in DC-4 aircraft. This experience created ideas that were developed into one of his best-known works, The High and the Mighty, about a DC-4 flight from Honolulu to San Francisco. Matson ultimately ceased operations in its failed bid to break Pan Am's monopoly on international routes. Gann spent time collecting unemployment before landing a job with Transocean Air Lines, which flew unscheduled charter flights throughout the Pacific. Transocean used the same hangars at the Oakland airport that Matson used and flew the same kind of aircraft (DC-4). However, it was in financial difficulties and from time to time, Gann found himself furloughed. By the time of the filming of The High and Mighty, Gann regarded himself an alumnus of the firm.

Gann would fly for one more airline, many years later. After becoming a very successful novelist and screenwriter, Gann had the desire for one more aviation adventure. He ferried a DC-3 from California to Honolulu to Apia, Samoa for Polynesian Airlines. Gann spent time in Samoa flying the line and teaching the pilots to fly the DC-3. However, the heat of the tropics and homesickness got to him, and his last airline experience came to an end.

== Sailing and conservationism ==
During his tenure with Matson, Gann moved his family to San Francisco, and tried his luck at commercial fishing during the end of his airline career. Gann started the Western Ocean Fishing Company and purchased a 40 ft. fishing boat which was renamed the Fred Holmes after his major investor. This venture was short lived, leaving Gann once again unemployed. Gann's father moved to the famed 17-Mile Drive in Pebble Beach for his retirement. In the early 1950s, Gann began to write Soldier of Fortune in a room at the Sundial Lodge, and his typist used the large dressing room as a bedroom.

In a bid to help his son and keep the grandkids nearby, he bought Gann a cottage a mile down the road in Pebble Beach. This cottage is where Gann's writing really took off, finishing the High and the Mighty, Fiddler's Green, Soldier of Fortune and working the associated movie deals. As Gann's fortunes grew, Eleanor's health began to fade. His marriage began to suffer and Eleanor eventually decided to divorce Gann. She was afflicted with numerous health problems, including severe rheumatoid arthritis, and following several years of declining health, she died on December 23, 1966, at Pebble Beach. Gann would endure several more tragedies in his personal life, including the death of his eldest son, George Kellogg Gann, who was swept overboard in a storm while working on an oil tanker in the Gulf of Alaska in 1973.

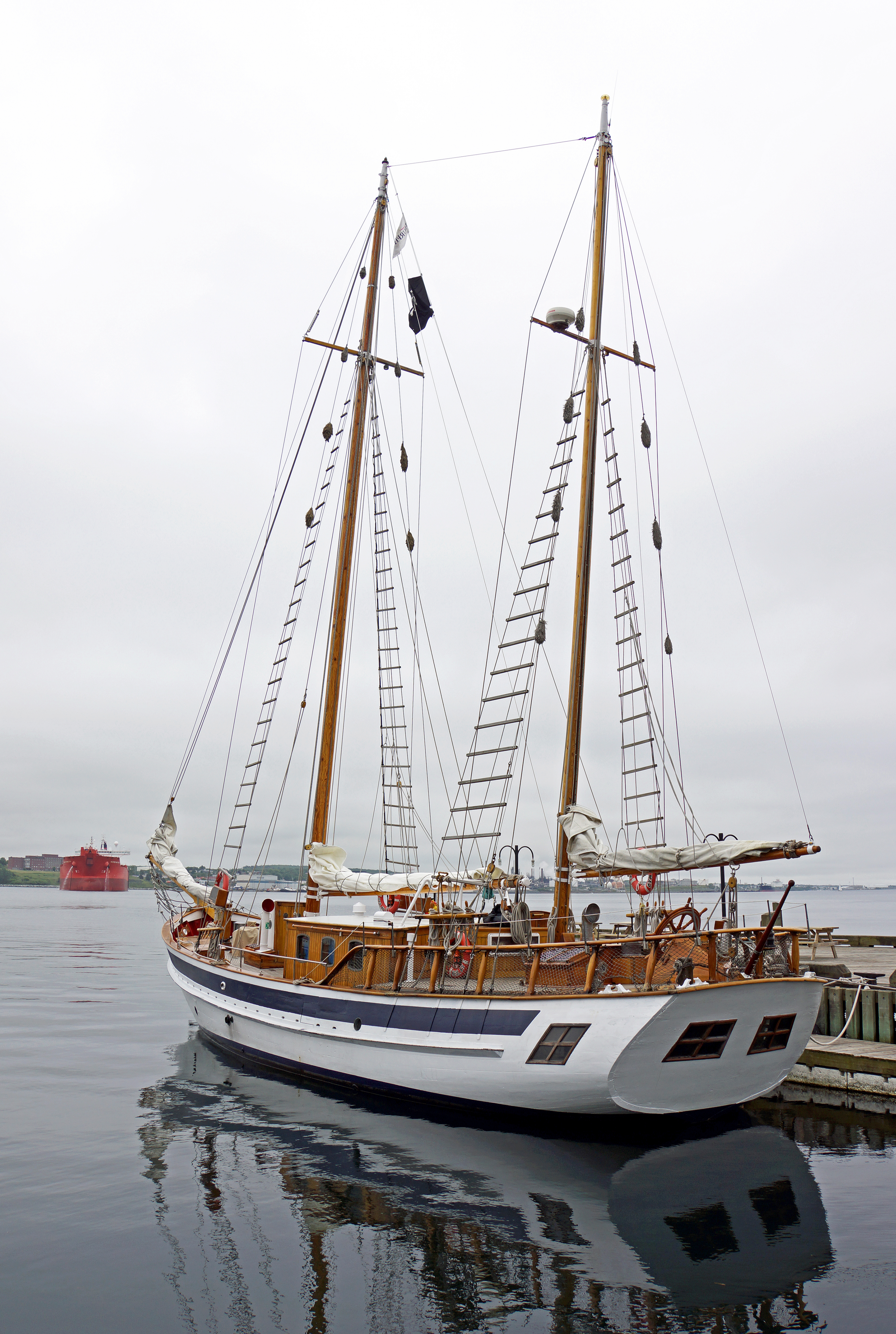
The Mar is a 75 ft. wooden ketch built in Denmark in 1975 by world renowned American aviator, author, filmmaker, sailor, fisherman and conservationist, Ernest K. Gann.

Gann had a lifelong love for sailing. He owned many boats of various types and sizes during his lifetime, which were chronicled in his memoir Song of the Sirens. Eventually, after years of planning and preparations, Gann purchased his 16th boat the Albatros (Dutch spelling with one "s"), a 117 ft (36 m) metal schooner in Rotterdam, Netherlands. Albatros had been a pilot boat in the North Sea, a radio station ship for the Germans in World War II, and finally as a Dutch cadet training vessel. Along with his family and a few friends he sailed the boat across the Atlantic Ocean, through the Panama Canal to the San Francisco Bay. Albatros was put through a major overhaul and converted to a square-sailed brigantine. Gann then sailed it around the South Pacific over the next three years. He later leased the ship to a movie company to be used as the major prop in a movie based upon his book Twilight for the Gods. Soon after the production ended, Albatros was sold and became a school vessel. It was later lost in the Gulf of Mexico. The sinking of the boat is the topic of a 1996 movie named White Squall starring Jeff Bridges.

As his family life deteriorated, Gann began spending time with a friend, Dodie Post, whom he later married. Both before and after they were married they were partners in adventure, travel, and later, environmental causes. In 1966 they purchased Red Mill Farm, an 800-acre (324 ha) ranch on San Juan Island in the state of Washington. This was the beginning of his next great passion, environmental conservation. For that purpose, they later donated the entirety of their ranch to the San Juan Preservation Trust after Post's death.

== Literary career ==
Gann described his writing methods as torturous; he would often literally chain himself to his desk until he finished a certain amount of text. He suffered long periods of writer's block, and frequently worried that he would run out of ideas. Despite his successful career, he continued to have strong feelings of self-doubt and often expressed surprise at the critical praise he received.

Gann's major works include the novel The High and the Mighty and his aviation memoir Fate Is the Hunter (regarded by many as one of the best-ever books about aviation). Notes and short stories scribbled during long layovers on his journeys across the North Atlantic became the source for his first serious fiction novel, Island in the Sky (1944), which was inspired by an actual Arctic rescue mission. It became an immediate best-seller as did Blaze of Noon (1946), a story about early airmail operations. His comprehensive autobiography entitled A Hostage to Fortune was published in 1978.

Although many of his 21 best-selling novels reveal Gann's devotion to aviation, others, including Twilight for the Gods, and Fiddler's Green display his love of the sea. His experiences as a fisherman, skipper and sailor, all contributed storylines and depth to his nautical fiction. He later wrote a memoir of his sailing life named Song of the Sirens.

Gann wrote, or adapted from his books, the stories and screenplays for several movies and television shows. For some of these productions he also served as a consultant and technical adviser during filming. Although it received positive reviews, Gann was displeased with the movie version of Fate Is the Hunter, and removed his name from the credits. (He later lamented that this decision cost him a "fortune" in royalties, as the movie played repeatedly on television for years afterward.) He wrote the story for the television miniseries Masada, based on The Antagonists, and the story for the 1980 Walt Disney movie, The Last Flight of Noah's Ark.

== Painting ==
Gann had a chicken coop on his Red Mill farm converted into an artist studio and writing office. He painted nautical scenes and aviation related paintings. Some of the dust jackets on his novels feature his original art work. Gann considered painting as his "second career" and hoped to inspire other senior citizens to continue the pursuit of their interests.

== Death and honors ==
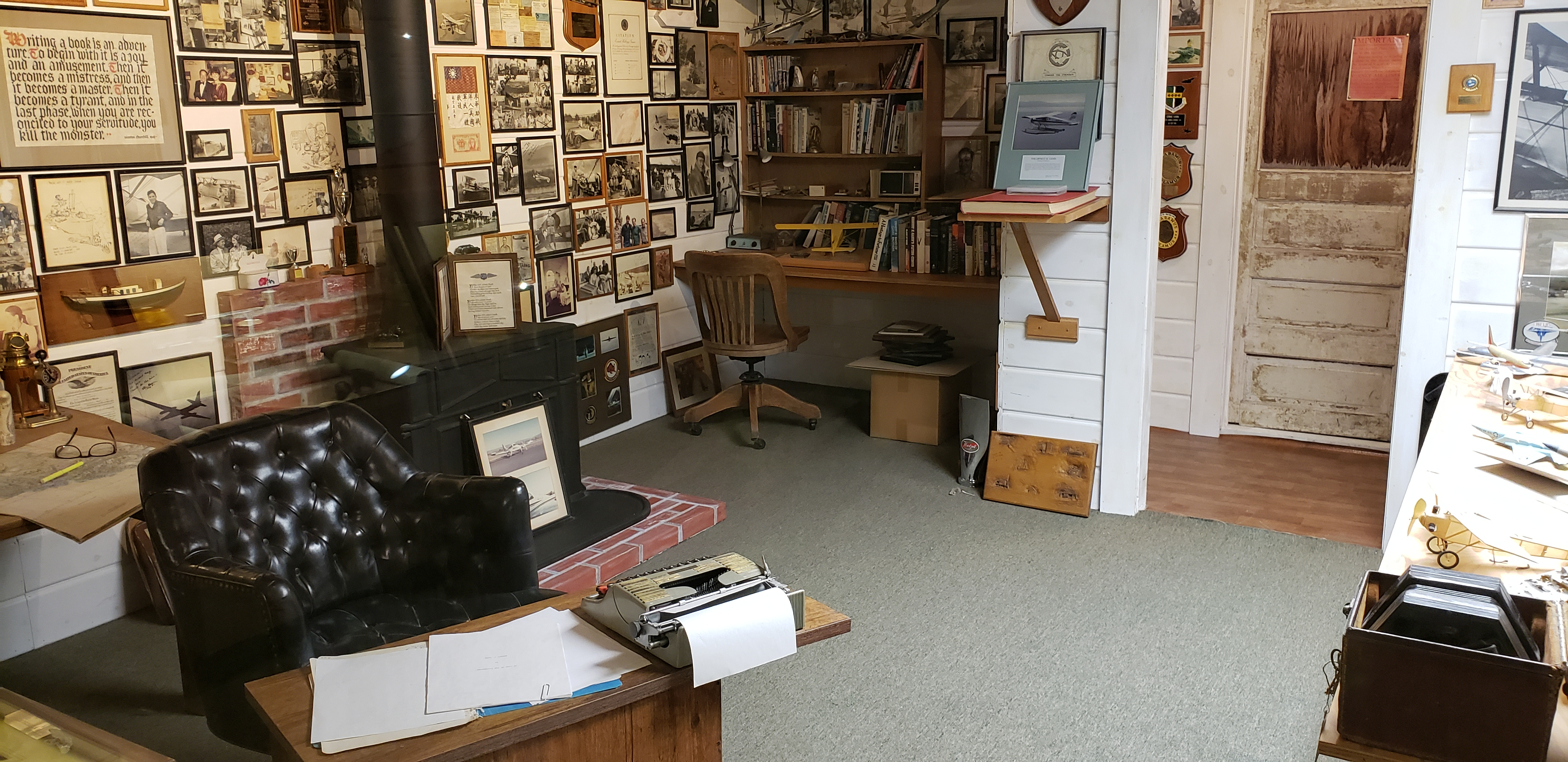
Ernest K. Gann writing studio

During the autumn of 1991, Gann again took to the skies to mark the 50th anniversary of his promotion to Captain for American Airlines; it would be his last flight. On December 19, 1991, Gann died in Friday Harbor, San Juan Island, Washington, at the age of 81 from kidney failure.

The Experimental Aircraft Association (EAA) moved Gann's entire chicken coop studio, including the barber's chair Gann used at his desk, to the EAA Aviation Museum in Oshkosh, Wisconsin, where it is on public display.

Gann was a member or honorary member of the Society of Flight Test Engineers, Order of Daedalians, Black Birds, OX-5 Aviation Pioneers, Secret Order of Quiet Birdmen, Colgate President's Club, Washington Athletic Club, Grey Eagles Club, 9th Strategic Reconnaissance Wing, Retired Eastern Pilots Association, and American Fighter Pilots Association.

Washington Governor Gary Locke posthumously awarded the Medal of Merit (the state's highest honor) to Gann on July 9, 2003. A cafe at Friday Harbor Airport is named "Ernie's Cafe" in his honor.

Flying magazine ranked Gann thirty-fourth in its 2013 list of the 51 heroes of aviation.

== Bibliography ==
=== Novels ===
- Island in the Sky.^{†} New York: Viking, 1944
- Blaze of Noon.^{†} New York: Holt, 1946
- Benjamin Lawless. Cornwall-on-Hudson, New York: Sloane, 1948
- Fiddler's Green. Cornwall-on-Hudson, New York: Sloane, 1950
- The High and the Mighty. Cornwall-on-Hudson, New York: Sloane, 1953
- Soldier of Fortune. Cornwall-on-Hudson, New York: Sloane, 1953
- Twilight for the Gods. Cornwall-on-Hudson, New York: Sloane, 1956
- Trouble with Lazy Ethel. Cornwall-on-Hudson, New York: Sloane, 1958
- Of Good and Evil. New York: Simon & Schuster, 1962
- In the Company of Eagles. New York: Simon & Schuster, 1966
- The Antagonists, AKA Masada.^{‡} New York: Simon & Schuster, 1970
- Band of Brothers. New York: Simon & Schuster, 1973
- Brain 2000. New York: Doubleday, 1980
- The Aviator. Farmington Hills, Michigan: GK Hall, 1981
- The Magistrate. Westminster, Maryland: Arbor House, 1982
- Gentlemen of Adventure. Westminster, Maryland: Arbor House, 1983
- The Triumph.^{‡} New York: Simon & Schuster, 1986
- The Bad Angel. Westminster, Maryland: Arbor House, 1987

^{†} Published as Armed Services Editions
^{‡} Two-part series

=== Nonfiction ===
Articles

- Gann contributed numerous articles to the aviation magazine Flying. In one series, he described his exotic travels with Dodie in their Cessna 310, the Noon Balloon, named because of its typically late departure time.

Autobiographies

- Fate Is the Hunter (memoir). New York: Simon & Schuster, 1961
- A Hostage to Fortune (autobiography). New York: Knopf, 1978
- Song of the Sirens (memoir). New York: Simon & Schuster, 1969

Guides

- Sky Roads. New York: Thomas Y. Crowell Company, 1940
- All American Aircraft. 1941
- Getting Them into the Blue. 1942
- Ernest K. Gann's Flying Circus. Macmillan, 1974
- The Black Watch: The Men Who Fly America's Secret Spy Planes. New York: Random House, 1989

== Adaptations ==
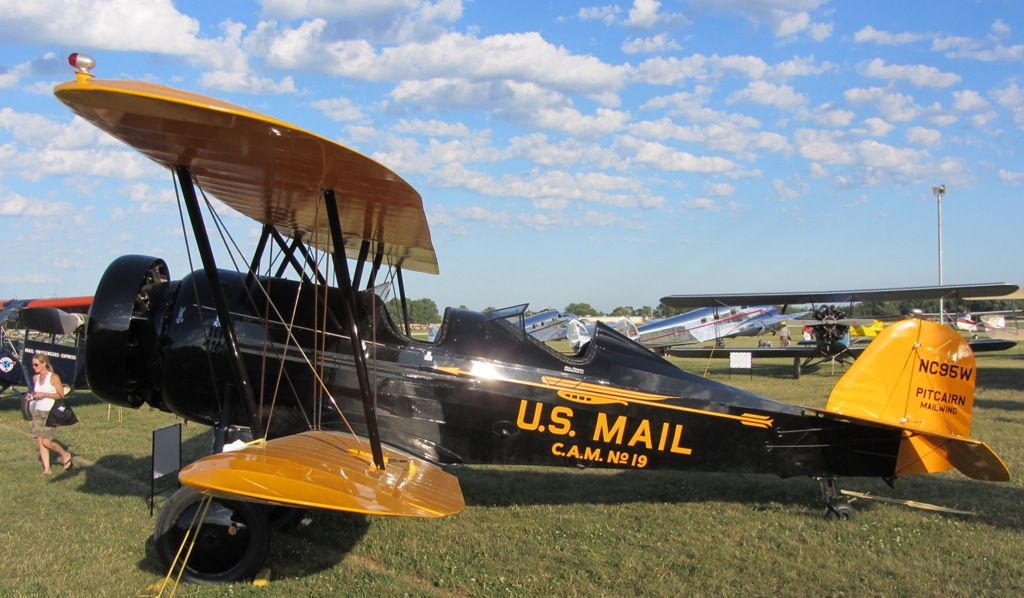
The Pitcairn Mailwing featured in Blaze of Noon

=== Feature films ===
- Blaze of Noon (1947) (novel)
- The Raging Tide (1951) (novel Fiddler's Green, screenplay)
- Island in the Sky (1953) (novel, screenplay)
- The High and the Mighty (1954) (novel, screenplay)
- Soldier of Fortune (1955) (novel, screenplay)
- Twilight for the Gods (1958) (novel, screenplay)
- Fate Is the Hunter (1964) (memoir)
- The Last Flight of Noah's Ark (1980) (story)
- The Aviator (1985) (novel)

=== Television ===
- Masada (1981, TV miniseries) (novel The Antagonists)
