= The High and the Mighty (film) =

1954 film

- Theatrical release poster
- Directed by: William A. Wellman
- Screenplay by: Ernest K. Gann
- Based on: The High and the Mighty; 1953 novel by Ernest K. Gann
- Produced by: Robert Fellows; John Wayne
- Starring: John Wayne; Claire Trevor; Laraine Day; Robert Stack; Jan Sterling; Phil Harris; Robert Newton; David Brian
- Cinematography: Archie Stout
- Edited by: Ralph Dawson
- Music by: Dimitri Tiomkin
- Production company: Wayne-Fellows Productions
- Distributed by: Warner Bros. Pictures
- Release dates: May 27, 1954 (Los Angeles, premiere); July 3, 1954 (USA)
- Running time: 147 minutes
- Country: United States
- Language: English
- Budget: $1.47 million
- Box office: $8.5 million

The High and the Mighty is a 1954 American aviation disaster film, directed by William A. Wellman, and written by Ernest K. Gann, who also wrote the 1953 novel on which his screenplay was based. Filmed in WarnerColor and CinemaScope, the film's cast was headlined by John Wayne, who was also the project's co-producer.

Wayne stars as a veteran airline first officer, Dan Roman, whose airliner has a catastrophic engine failure while crossing the Pacific Ocean. The film's supporting cast includes Claire Trevor, Laraine Day, Robert Stack, Jan Sterling, Phil Harris, and Robert Newton. Composer Dimitri Tiomkin won an Oscar for his original score; while his title song was also nominated for an Oscar, it did not actually appear in the theatrical release prints, nor in its much later restoration. The film received mostly positive reviews and grossed $8.5 million on its theatrical release.

== Plot ==
In Honolulu, Hawaii, a DC-4 airliner prepares to take off for San Francisco, California with 17 passengers and a crew of 5. Former captain Dan Roman, the flight's veteran first officer, known for his habit of whistling, is haunted by an air crash that killed his wife and son and left him with a permanent limp. The captain, John Sullivan, suffers from a secret fear of responsibility after logging thousands of hours looking after the lives of passengers and aircrew. Young second officer Hobie Wheeler and veteran navigator Lenny Wilby are contrasts in age and experience.

Meanwhile, flight attendant Spalding attends to her passengers, each with varying personal problems, including jaded former actress May Holst, unhappily married heiress Lydia Rice, aging beauty queen Sally McKee, and cheerful vacationer Ed Joseph. Spalding befriends the terminally ill Frank Briscoe, after being charmed by his pocket watch. A last-minute arrival, Humphrey Agnew, causes the aircrew concern with his odd behavior.

After a routine departure, the airliner experiences sporadic, sudden vibrations. Although the aircrew senses that something may be wrong with the propellers, they cannot locate a problem. When a vibration causes Spalding to burn her hand, Dan inspects the tail compartment but still finds nothing wrong.

After nightfall, as the airliner passes the point of no return, Agnew confronts fellow passenger Ken Childs, accusing him of having an affair with his wife. The men struggle and Agnew pulls out a pistol, intending to shoot Childs, but before he can do so, the airliner swerves violently when it loses a propeller and its engine catches fire. The crew quickly extinguishes the fire, but the engine has twisted off its mounting. In mid-ocean, the aircrew radios for help and sets in motion a rescue operation. Dan discovers that the airliner is now losing fuel from additional damage to a wing tank. That, combined with adverse winds and the increased drag of the damaged engine, means that the airliner will eventually run out of fuel and be forced to ditch.

Unassuming José Locota disarms Agnew and confiscates the pistol, compelling him to sit quietly. Gustave Pardee, who up until now has made no secret of his fear of flying, inspires calm in his terrified fellow passengers. Dan calmly explains the situation, trying to lessen their anxiety, but warns that their chances of making the coast are "one in a thousand". The passengers rally around each other and find changed perspectives about their existing problems. They toss luggage from the airliner to lighten its weight, with May Holst literally kissing her mink coat goodbye.

In San Francisco, Manager Tim Garfield comes to the airline's operations center but has little hopes for the airliner's chances. A favorable change in the winds raises the crew's hopes that they have just enough fuel to reach San Francisco, but Wilby discovers that he made an elementary error in navigation and their actual remaining time in the air remains inadequate.

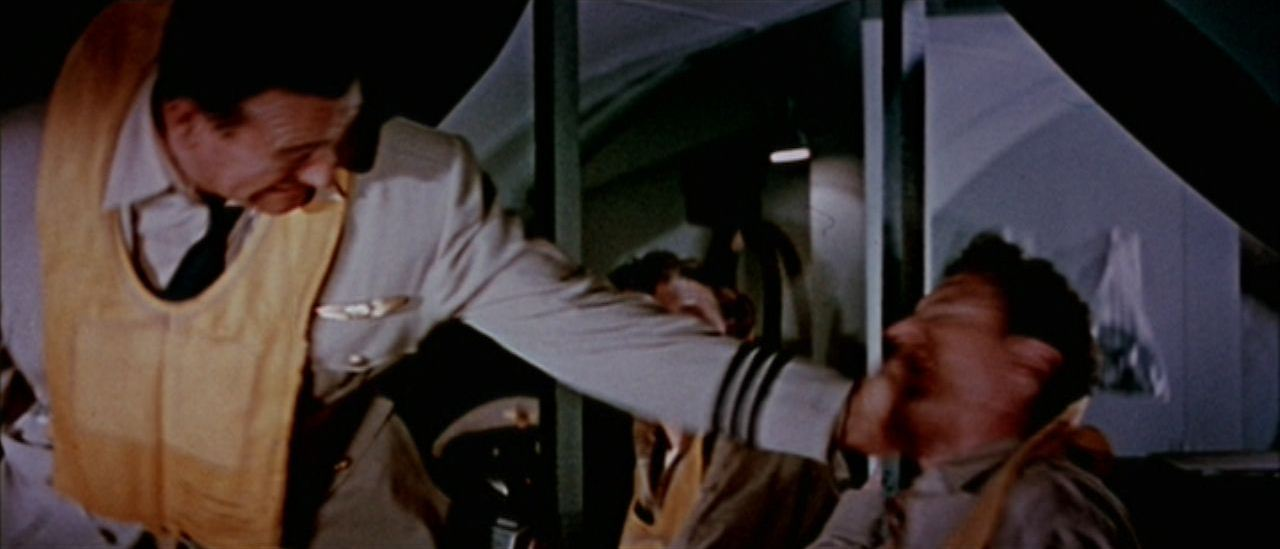
Captain John Sullivan panics and prepares to immediately ditch and Officer Dan Roman slaps him back to his senses

Dan's experience tells him that their luck would be better trying to make land than ditching in rough seas at night. Sullivan panics and prepares to ditch immediately, but Dan slaps him back to his senses. Thinking clearly again, Sullivan decides against ditching. As the airliner approaches rain-swept, night time San Francisco at a perilously low altitude, the airport prepares for an emergency instrument landing. The airliner narrowly surmounts the city's hills and breaks out of the clouds with the runway lights dead ahead, guiding them to a safe landing. As the passengers disembark, Garfield watches their reactions as they are harried by reporters. After the tumult dies down, he joins the aircrew inspecting their damaged engine and informs Dan that only 30 gallons of fuel remained in their tanks. Dan acknowledges the gamble they took and walks away, limping and whistling into the night. "So long ... you ancient pelican", Garfield mutters to himself.

== Cast ==
Credited cast members (in order of on-screen credits) and roles:

- John Wayne as Dan Roman (First Officer)
- Claire Trevor as May Holst
- Laraine Day as Lydia Rice
- Robert Stack as John Sullivan (Captain)
- Jan Sterling as Sally McKee
- Phil Harris as Ed Joseph
- Ann Doran as Mrs. Joseph
- Robert Newton as Gustave Pardee
- David Brian as Ken Childs
- Paul Kelly as Donald Flaherty
- Sidney Blackmer as Humphrey Agnew
- Julie Bishop as Lillian Pardee
- Pedro Gonzalez Gonzalez as Gonzales (ship's assistant Radio Officer, SS Cristobal Trader)
- John Howard as Howard Rice
- Wally Brown as Lenny Wilby (Navigator)
- William Campbell as Hobie Wheeler (Second Officer)
- John Qualen as José Locota
- Paul Fix as Frank Briscoe
- George Chandler as Ben Sneed (Far East Crew Chief, Honolulu)
- Joy Kim as Dorothy Chen
- Michael Wellman as Toby Field
- Douglas Fowley as Alsop (TOPAC Agent, Honolulu)
- Regis Toomey as Tim Garfield (TOPAC Operations Manager, San Francisco)
- Carl "Alfalfa" Switzer (Note: Carl "Alfalfa" Switzer (Ens. Keim) derived his nickname from the character "Alfalfa" for which he became famous portraying as a child actor in the Our Gang comedies from 1935 to 1940.) as Ens. Keim, USCG (ASR Pilot, Alameda)
- Robert Keys as Lt. Mowbray, USCG (ASR Pilot, Alameda)
- William Hopper as Roy (Sally McKee's fiancé)
- William Schallert as TOPAC Dispatcher (San Francisco)
- Julie Mitchum as Susie Wilby (Mrs. Lenny Wilby)
- Doe Avedon as Miss Spalding (Flight Attendant)
- Karen Sharpe as Nell Buck
- John Smith as Milo Buck
- Walter Reed as Mr. Field (uncredited)
- Douglas Kennedy as Boyd, Public Relations (uncredited)

== Production ==
=== Script ===
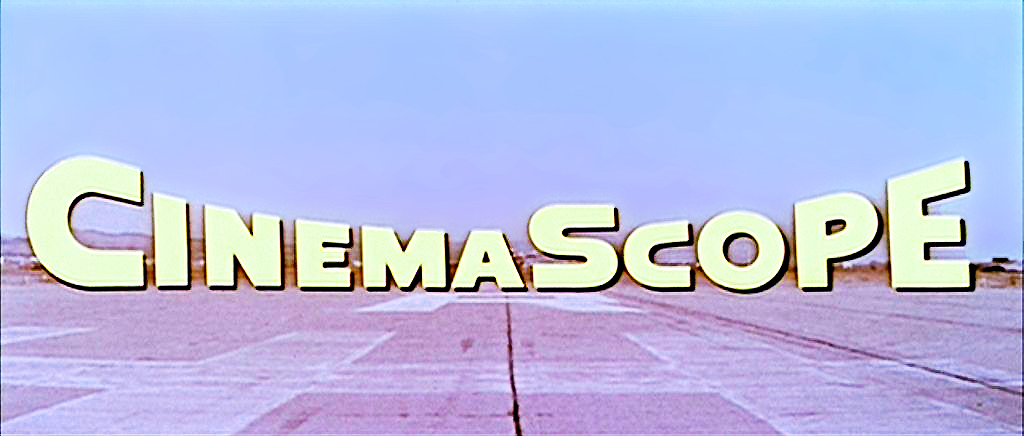
John Wayne pushed for the use of CinemaScope, although Wellman later considered it "bulky and unwieldy" during filming

After Wayne and Robert Fellows had formed Wayne-Fellows Productions in 1952, the duo worked on several films including Big Jim McLain, Plunder of the Sun, and Island in the Sky. In 1953, director William Wellman was releasing Island in the Sky when he learned that his screenwriter Ernest Gann was writing another aviation story. Gann shared the story with Wellman, and the director offered to make a sales pitch. Wellman relayed the story of The High and the Mighty to Wayne-Fellows Productions. Wayne purchased the story on the spot, agreeing to give Gann $55,000 for the story and the screenplay plus 10 percent of the film's earnings. Wayne also agreed to give Wellman 30 percent of the earnings to be the film's director, based on the condition that The High and the Mighty would be filmed in CinemaScope. It was a widescreen projection process that involved using an anamorphic lens to widen the image produced by regular 35 mm film. Wellman's experience was that the CinemaScope camera was "bulky and unwieldy", and the director preferred to station the camera in one place. Since The High and Mighty was set on an airliner with cramped quarters, Wellman did not need to worry about flexibility in composing shots. He hired William H. Clothier, with whom he had worked on many films, as cinematographer (assigned to the second unit sequences, only; Archie Stout, with whom Wayne had a long association, had already been assigned as primary cinematographer). Ernest K. Gann wrote the original novels on which both films were based, along with both screenplays, of which both films, including dialogue, were closely adapted.

The High and the Mighty depicts a dramatic situation in a civil transport aviation context. Jack L. Warner initially was opposed to the film, believing that audiences would not stay interested in a plot stretching more than 100 minutes involving the passengers in an airliner. William Wellman had reservations about the "intimate" storylines, which dominate the production, preferring to focus more on the airliner and pilots. Yet, after script deliberations set out the final screenplay, he endorsed the novel approach that harked back to earlier films such as Grand Hotel.

=== The airliner ===
The Douglas DC-4 (N4665V) used to film the daylight flying sequences and the Honolulu "gate" sequence was a former C-54A-10-DC built as a military transport in 1942 at Long Beach, California, by Douglas Aircraft Company. When the exterior and flying sequences were filmed in November 1953, the airliner was being operated by Oakland, California-based non-scheduled carrier Transocean Air Lines(1946–1962), the largest civil aviation operator of converted C-54s in the 1950s, and named "The African Queen". (Note: Ironically, a Transocean sister ship to this aircraft, The Argentine Queen (N4726V), was lost with no survivors while ditching on March 28, 1964, on a flight for another carrier from Honolulu to Los Angeles under circumstances similar to those in The High and the Mighty. This coincidence and the similarity of nicknames has resulted in some sources erroneously reporting this as the aircraft used during filming, but Keating's log book verifies N4665V's role.) Ernest K. Gann wrote the original story while he was flying DC-4s for Transocean over the Hawaii–California routes. The film's fictional airline's name "TOPAC" was painted over the Transocean's red, white, and yellow color scheme for filming.

Transocean Air Lines director of flight operations Bill Keating did the stunt flying for the film. Keating and Gann had flown together and the author recommended his friend for the job. During preproduction filming, Keating was involved in a near-incident when simulating the climactic night emergency landing. After several approaches, Wellman asked for "one more take" touching down even closer to the runway's threshold. Keating complied, taking out runway lights with his nose landing gear before "peeling off" and executing a go-around. Wellman quipped that the crash would look good in another film.

A second former C-54 equipped with a large double cargo door used to accommodate the loading of freight on pallets, was employed for all shots of the damaged airliner on the ground at San Francisco in the film's closing sequences. A propellerless, fire-scorched engine on a distorted mount, with a 30° "droop", was installed on the left wing of this aircraft to represent the damage which had imperiled the flight. Exterior airport scenes were filmed at the Glendale Grand Central Air Terminal, east of Burbank, California, where an outdoor film set was constructed to replicate the terminal gates at SFO in the early 1950s. Additional exteriors shots were taken at Oakland Municipal Airport, including all boarding, engine run-up, taxiing, and takeoff scenes used in the opening sequences. The external night and damaged in-flight sequences were filmed in a studio where a large-scale filming miniature was photographed against backdrops. Passenger-cabin and flight-deck interior scenes were all filmed on sets built on a Warner Bros. sound stage.

=== Filming ===
Filming took place from November 16, 1953, to January 11, 1954, on a Goldwyn Pictures lot and Warners soundstages in Hollywood. Most of the cast sat in the passenger cabin for weeks during filming. Cast members recalled disliking the experience; Claire Trevor called it "a dreary picture to make". Some cast members passed the time by staying in character in between shots and doing cryptograms. During cold weather, the soundstage was not properly heated, and cast members suffered from the cold. Wayne and Stack did not face similar problems since they were filmed separately and comfortably in the cockpit set. Additional filming took place in San Francisco as well as at the Royal Hawaiian Hotel and Waikiki Beach in Hawaii.

At one point during filming, Wayne attempted to assert himself as director. Wellman argued publicly with him in defense of his directorial control, telling Wayne: "Look, you come back here behind the camera and do my job, and you're going to be just as ridiculous doing it as I would be going out there with that screwy voice of yours and that fairy walk and being Duke Wayne". Despite the initial issues on set, the two otherwise had a positive relationship and worked together on later films, including Track of the Cat and Blood Alley.

Aircraft feature prominently in The High and the Mighty, including two unusual aviation events: the U.S. Coast Guard's short-lived use of the B-17/PB-1G "Dumbo" rescue aircraft along with a brief launch clip of experiments with the U.S. Navy JB-2 version of the V-1 (an early kind of cruise missile) at an atomic missile test site. The postwar use of piston-engine aircraft in oceanic flights was a key element of the film, which required the use of a then-modern airliner.

Wellman, a pilot in real life, maintained the point-of-view of the flight path of the airliner traveling as the support staff in San Francisco would observe it: flying from the west to the east, from Honolulu to San Francisco, film frame right to film frame left, except during takeoff and landing. Similarly, the U.S. Coast Guard rescue plane was shown flying from San Francisco to towards the stricken airliner, film frame left to film frame right.

The film was initially budgeted at $1.32 million, but cost overruns led to a total cost of $1.47 million. For directing, Wellman received $100,000 as well as a portion of the film's profits. Wayne earned $175,000 in addition to a percentage of the film's box office receipts.

=== Casting ===
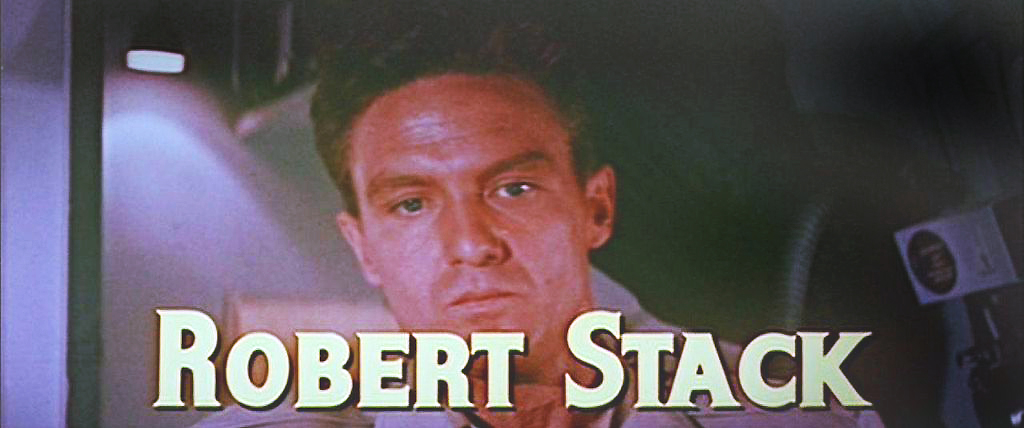
Although Wayne and Wellman had considered Robert Cummings for the role of the captain, Robert Stack was selected after an interview with Wellman

Casting for The High and the Mighty was problematic because there were no real "leading" roles, which resulted in many of Hollywood's major stars turning down roles that did not appear to be "big" enough for them. With stars such as Barbara Stanwyck, Dorothy McGuire, Ginger Rogers, Ida Lupino, and Joan Crawford rejecting parts in the film, Wellman ended up casting good but lesser-known actors in some of the roles. Spencer Tracy was offered the role of Dan Roman but turned it down because, Wellman said, Tracy found the script "lousy"; assistant director Andrew McLaglen claimed that Tracy's friends told the actor he was "in for an ego-bruising ride." It was thought that Tracy, a liberal Democrat, would receive the 'ego bruising' from Wellman a registered Republican. This led Tracy to excuse himself from the film. Without Tracy, Jack Warner threatened to remove the Warner Bros. funding unless another prominent lead actor could be found. Wellman convinced producer and actor John Wayne to replace Tracy in the role. Wayne later said during and after production that he did not like his performance. McLaglen recalled: "He said, 'Well, it never had any love story.' I said 'It had the greatest love story that had ever been written.'" McLaglen and Wayne argued about Wayne's performance, but Wayne never conceded about his performance.

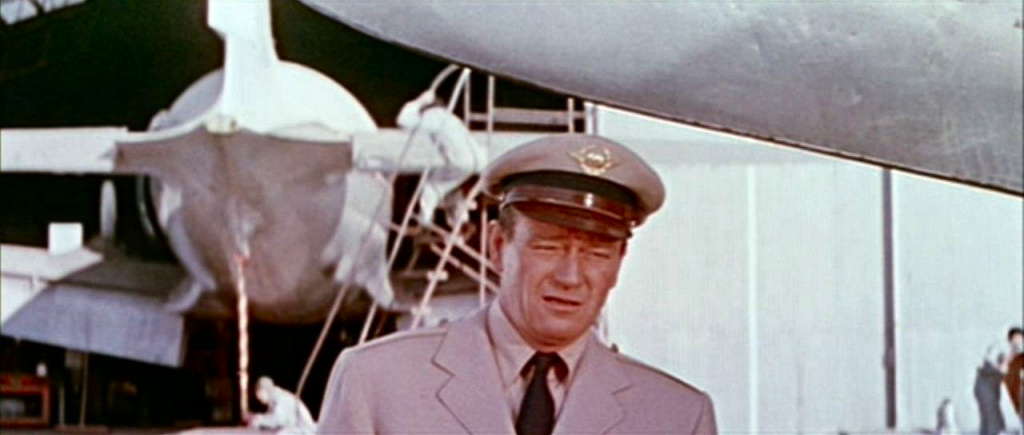
Initially a producer, John Wayne was cast in the film after Spencer Tracy dropped out.

For the other major male lead, Wayne had promised the role to his friend Bob Cummings, who was a pilot and had Wellman's recommendation as well. However Stack went after the role and an interview with Wellman eventually convinced the director that a non-pilot could effectively portray the drama of a cockpit conflict.

Stanwyck's refusal was especially galling, as the director had always treated her as a "pet". Pedro Gonzalez Gonzalez appeared in this film and several others with John Wayne.

The High and the Mighty and Island in the Sky shared many of the same cast and production crew. Along with Wayne, six other actors appear in both films: Regis Toomey, Paul Fix, Carl "Alfalfa" Switzer, Ann Doran, George Chandler, and Michael Wellman.

=== Music ===
Composer Dimitri Tiomkin scored the film and composed the theme song "The High and the Mighty"; the song was also called "The Whistling Song" because John Wayne whistled the tune during production. Tiomkin's music topped hit parade charts and remained there for weeks, increasing the film's profile. A 1955 national survey of disc jockeys labeled the song as the "most whistleable tune". Hollywood producers learned that a publicized title song could have value in attracting audiences to movie theaters. Therefore, the song's "haunting strains" were played on the radio and on recordings in the years after the film's release. It was nominated for the Best Song at the 27th Academy Awards in 1955, but lost to "Three Coins in the Fountain" from the film of the same name.

== Impact ==
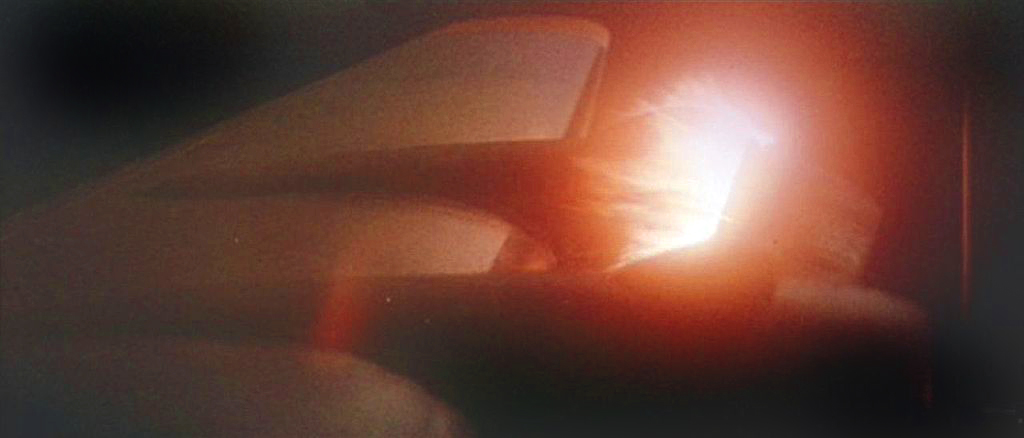
The plot's use of passengers and aircrew responding to an engine fire helped influence the disaster film genre

The High and the Mighty was produced nearly two decades before Airport and its sequels (along with the Airplane! parodies, the first of which featured Stack lampooning himself). The High and the Mighty served as a template for later disaster-themed films such as the Airport series (1970–79), The Poseidon Adventure (1972), The Towering Inferno (1974), The Hindenburg (1975), and Titanic (1997). The film was one of Wayne's co-productions in which he also starred, a practice which would not become widespread until the 1980s and 1990s.

== Release ==
=== Box office performance ===
The High and the Mighty had its premiere in Hollywood at Grauman's Egyptian Theatre on May 27, 1954. It was commercially released on July 3, 1954. Although the choice of the new Cinemascope format limited theater use, it was also one of the most commercially successful films that year. Within two months of its release, the film was ranked first in box-office receipts and set the record for the "fastest return of negative cost" (screen jargon for making back production costs). Beyond the film's initial run in theaters, it grossed $8.5 million in total box office receipts and was the sixth most popular film of the year in North America.

=== Critical reception ===
At the time of the release of The High and the Mighty, it received mostly positive reviews. Variety wrote that the film "is a class drama, blended with mass appeal into a well-rounded show that can catch on with most any audience". Edwin Schallert of the Los Angeles Times called the film "an enormously vital picture, amazingly associated with life's panorama today, and thus filled with a rare kind of tingling excitement, especially for a modern air-minded public". Joseph Henry Jackson, writing for the San Francisco Chronicle, said that the film has "a story that gives you no time to catch your breath".

The High and the Mighty also received some negative reviews, with Richard Griffin of the Los Angeles Times writing that another reviewer had criticized the cast: "All are fabricated characters—and that is the way they are played". The film's running time was also commented on by several reviewers who called it "an unbelievably long trip" and "the extreme length of its proceedings, which seems almost full flight time Honolulu-San Francisco".

Modern reviews of The High and the Mighty are mixed. Wayne biographer Ronald L. Davis described the film, "While its plot is somewhat synthetic, the special effects and performances make for an engaging film". David Nusair of Reel Film Reviews, called the film "bloated and overlong" and that it relies on "artificial, needlessly drawn-out speeches for its characters".

The film holds a 46% rating on Rotten Tomatoes, based on 13 reviews.

=== Awards and nominations ===
Award	Category	Nominee(s)	Result	Ref.
Academy Awards	Best Director	William A. Wellman	Nominated	
Academy Awards	Best Supporting Actress	Jan Sterling	Nominated	
Academy Awards	Best Supporting Actress	Claire Trevor	Nominated	
Academy Awards	Best Film Editing	Ralph Dawson	Nominated	
Academy Awards	Best Original Music Score	Dimitri Tiomkin	Won	
Academy Awards	Best Song	"The High and the Mighty"; Music by Dimitri Tiomkin; Lyrics by Ned Washington	Nominated	
Directors Guild of America Awards	Outstanding Directorial Achievement in Motion Pictures	William A. Wellman	Nominated	
Golden Globe Awards	Best Supporting Actress – Motion Picture	Jan Sterling	Won	
Golden Globe Awards	Most Promising Newcomer – Female	Karen Sharpe	Won	

== Restoration and re-release ==
By the 1960s and 1970s, The High and the Mighty became a television staple but, due to tighter broadcast schedules and several royalty disputes, its last appearances on broadcast television were in 1982 on Superstation WTBS, and on Cinemax in March/April 1985. One crucial element in the film's resurrection was the extensive restoration required after decades of languishing in the Wayne film vault, where the film suffered major water damage and one reel was lost for a period of time, making the possibility of such a pristine restoration seemingly unlikely. Significant portions of the film stock showed color fading, which necessitated a restoration process. The restoration took more than a year, and three months were spent on fixing the audio.

Demand arose to get the film released in home video formats. The estate of John Wayne, through Gretchen Wayne, the widow of the actor's late son, Michael, made a deal in the early 2000s with Cinetech (film) and Chace Productions (sound) to update and restore both The High and the Mighty and Island in the Sky. This led to a distribution agreement with Wayne's production and distribution company Batjac Productions and both American Movie Classics (for TV rights) and Paramount Pictures (home video rights). Following the recovery of the lost reel, The High and the Mighty, after its meticulous restoration, was rebroadcast on television in July 2005, the first broadcasts of the film in 20 years. Together with Island in the Sky, it was released as a "special collector's edition" DVD with new cover art in August of the same year by Paramount Home Entertainment. It was also broadcast on Turner Classic Movies on October 27, 2007.

== See also ==
- John Wayne filmography
