= Vendovi Island =

Native name: Pen’e’nex’weng
- Etymology: Ro Vendovi

Geography
- Location: Salish Sea
- Archipelago: San Juan Islands
- Area: 217 acres (88 ha)
- Coastline: 2.8 mi (4.5 km)

Administration
- United States
- State: Washington
- County: Skagit

Vendovi Island is an island located in Skagit County, Washington, United States. Vendovi Island is located to the west of Samish Bay, and between Lummi Island and Guemes Island.

== History ==
Vendovi Island was named after Fijian chief Ro Veidovi, who was arrested and taken to Washington by the Wilkes Expedition. The nearby Viti Rocks were also named in Veidovi's honor, being the native pronunciation of Fiji. According to Lummi Nation member and poet, Rena Priest, the Lummi name for the island is Pen’e’nex’weng or "the island where we go to p’aneq, to dig for xwelol [camas]".

Vendovi Island was purchased by John Fluke, founder of the Fluke Corporation, in 1964. Fluke's family built the only manmade structures on the island, including the family home, cemetery, and other buildings. In 2010 the island was purchased at auction from the Fluke family by the San Juan Preservation Trust for $6.4 million.

== San Juan Preservation Trust ==
Since December 2010 Vendovi Island has been managed by as a nature preserve by the San Juan Preservation Trust. The island is open to the public between April and September of each year, with access from a cove on the north side of the island.

The cove is protected by a breakwater that also provides habitat to native seabirds. By 2025 this breakwater had significantly eroded and the Trust began to raise donations for restoration and rebuilding.

Along with the buildings built by the Flukes, the island includes 3 miles of maintained trails. The island is also notable for a lack of deer, which creates a rich understory of native plants.
