= Twilight for the Gods =

1958 film by Joseph Pevney

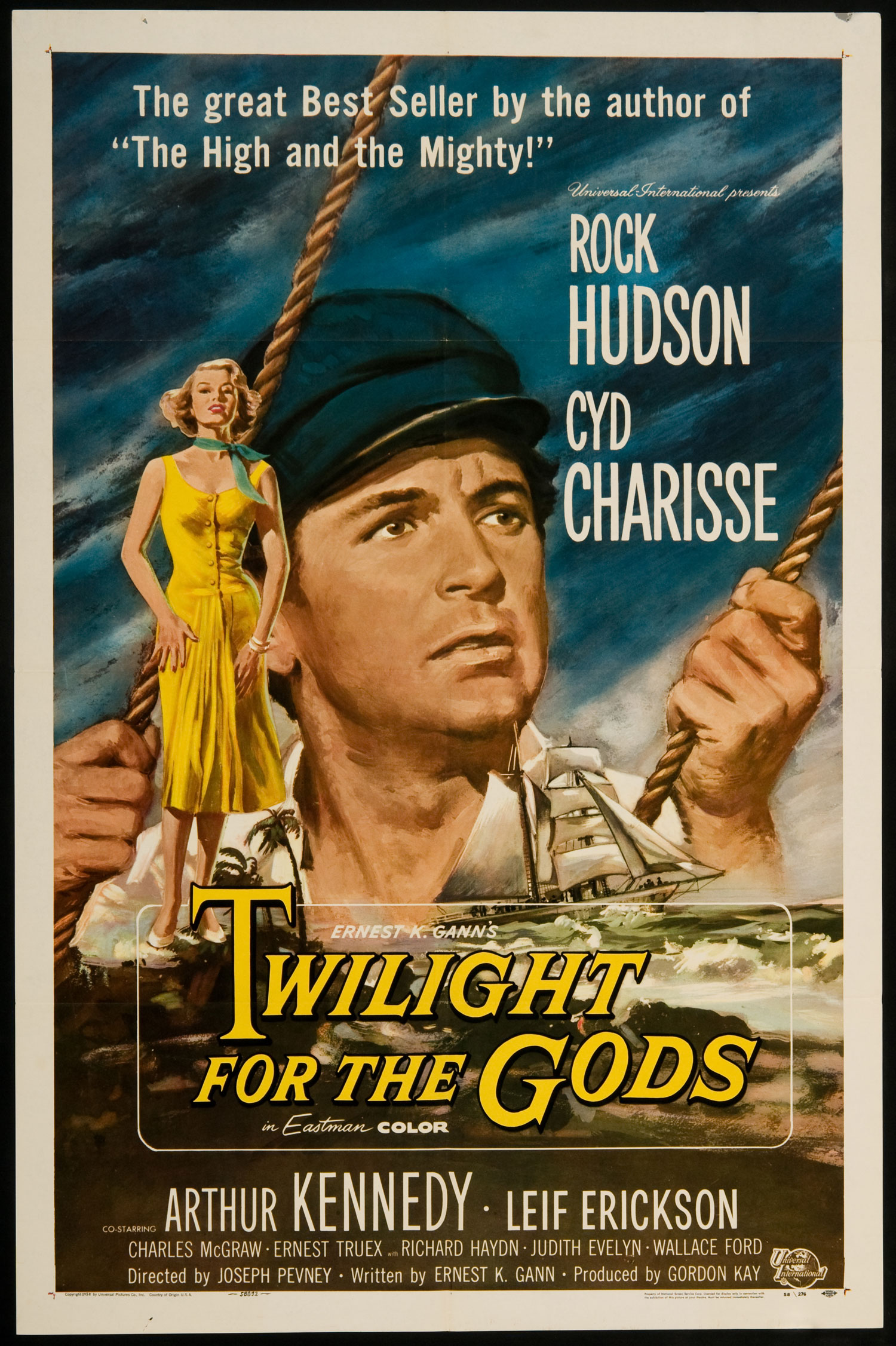
- Original poster (1958) by Reynold Brown
- Directed by: Joseph Pevney
- Written by: Ernest K. Gann
- Based on: Twilight for the Gods by Ernest K. Gann
- Produced by: Gordon Kay
- Starring: Rock Hudson; Cyd Charisse; Arthur Kennedy
- Cinematography: Irving Glassberg
- Edited by: Tony Martinelli
- Music by: David Raksin
- Production company: Universal Pictures
- Distributed by: Universal Pictures
- Release date: August 6, 1958
- Running time: 120 minutes
- Country: United States
- Language: English
- Box office: $1.6 million

Twilight for the Gods is a 1958 American Eastmancolor adventure film directed by Joseph Pevney and starring Rock Hudson and Cyd Charisse. The story is based on the novel Twilight for the Gods by Ernest K. Gann (though the opening credits read "Written by Ernest K. Gann," implying it is an original screenplay rather than an adaptation). An underlying current in the book is about sailing ships with their long histories being replaced by modern steamers, which is what the title refers to—the end of an era for the square-sailed ships.

== Plot ==
After being court-martialed and discharged from the Navy, Captain Bell (Rock Hudson) turns to drink. Reduced to skippering a rundown brigantine in the South Seas, he takes on board a disparate group of passengers and crew, including a prostitute, a show-biz entrepreneur, a missionary, a washed up opera singer, a couple of refugees, and a load of copra bound for Mexico. The ship springs a leak during a storm, and the true characters of all on board are revealed as the ship tries to make port in Honolulu before it sinks.

== Cast ==
- Rock Hudson as Capt. David Bell
- Cyd Charisse as Mrs. Charlotte King aka Inez Leidstrom
- Arthur Kennedy as First Mate Ramsay
- Leif Erickson as Harry Hutton, theatrical manager
- Charles McGraw as Yancy
- Ernest Truex as Reverend Butterfield, missionary
- Richard Haydn as Oliver Wiggins, British playboy
- Judith Evelyn as Ethel Peacock, vocalist with Hutton
- Wallace Ford as Old Brown, shipmate
- Vladimir Sokoloff as Feodor Morris, emigrant
- Celia Lovsky as Ida Morris, emigrant
- Robert Hoy as Keim
- Charles Horvath as Lott
- Maurice Marsac as Shipping clerk
- Virginia Gregg as Myra Pringle
