= Fate Is the Hunter (film) =

1964 film by Ralph Nelson

- Theatrical release poster
- Directed by: Ralph Nelson
- Screenplay by: Harold Medford
- Based on: Fate Is the Hunter by Ernest K. Gann
- Produced by: Aaron Rosenberg
- Starring: Glenn Ford; Suzanne Pleshette; Nancy Kwan; Rod Taylor
- Cinematography: Milton R. Krasner
- Edited by: Robert L. Simpson
- Music by: Jerry Goldsmith
- Production company: Arcola Pictures Corp.
- Distributed by: 20th Century Fox
- Release date: November 8, 1964
- Running time: 106 minutes
- Country: United States
- Language: English
- Budget: $2,525,000
- Box office: $2.2 million

Fate Is the Hunter is a 1964 American aviation disaster drama film from 20th Century Fox, produced by Aaron Rosenberg, directed by Ralph Nelson, that stars Glenn Ford, Nancy Kwan, Suzanne Pleshette and Rod Taylor. Fate Is the Hunter also features Jane Russell (playing herself entertaining for the USO in a flashback sequence), Nehemiah Persoff, Wally Cox, and Mark Stevens. Dorothy Malone also makes an uncredited appearance. The film features an early film score by composer Jerry Goldsmith.

The film's storyline concerns the crash of a commercial airliner that killed all aboard except for one of the crew, a stewardess. Civil Aeronautics Board investigators blame pilot error, but the airline's Director of Flight Operations, himself a pilot, refuses to accept that conclusion and demands that the inquiry probe deeper into all the circumstances that contributed to the disaster. The film explores the lives of passengers and crew as well as the technical operations of aircraft, the process of investigation, and the pressures brought to bear by relentless news media and industry politics.

== Plot ==
After the failure of both engines of his passenger jet during take-off, pilot Jack Savage (Rod Taylor) successfully belly lands the plane along what initially appears to be an open stretch of beach. However, it uncontrollably skids into a pier, exploding and killing all but one aboard, stewardess Martha Webster (Susanne Pleshette).

Early in the investigation, it is discovered that one engine failed after ingesting a seagull, while the other is mysteriously mechanically sound. Focus turns to pilot-error, as Savage was seen in a bar as little as an hour before the flight. The captain's wartime buddy, airline executive Sam C. McBane (Glenn Ford), is convinced of his friend's innocence and doggedly investigates. Flashbacks deal with both Jack's past and Sam meeting him, plus others they used to know, as well as Savage's ex-fiancée and his current girlfriend Sally Fraser (Nancy Kwan). Sally introduces the idea of fate to McBane, who rejects it. During the investigation, it is revealed that the pier structure had been scheduled for demolition but the project had been delayed a few days; had the pier been dismantled on time the plane would have made a successful belly-landing. Finally McBane learns that Savage had accompanied another war buddy to the bar and had not been drinking himself. During a press conference, McBane struggles with the concept of fate and coincidence as the possible cause of the tragedy. Meanwhile, Webster, when interviewed in the hospital, insists that she witnessed fault warnings and alarm bells for both engines.

Eventually, a re-enactment test flight is organized as part of the investigation. Piloted by McBane, its purpose is to exactly recreate the flight of the ill-fated airliner. Every detail both physical (the use of sandbags on seats to simulate the weight of the passengers) and sequential (chain of temporal events) is replicated. McBane tries to convince Webster to board the test flight, as she is the only remaining eyewitness to the cockpit procedures. She struggles through her post-traumatic reaction and boards the flight at the last moment. After take-off, Webster performs all of her normal duties and brings McBane coffee, just as she had done for the original flight crew. He sets the cup on a center console just as Savage had. McBane then shuts down an engine, simulating its incapacitation. He orders the craft to not be immediately trimmed, as it was not during the original event.

A short time later, the second engine warning light and alarm indicates there is a serious engine fire in the remaining good engine, exactly as Webster had reported, and the radio fails. To maintain flight, McBane orders the first engine restarted. Then he notices that the coffee cup on the console spilled during the turbulence of the first engine shut-down. He opens the console's access panel and finds that coffee seeped in, short-circuiting the wiring and causing both the radio failure and a false fire warning. In reality both the original and test flights still had a fully functioning second engine, enough to prevent the crash. McBane orders the second engine restarted, disregarding its fire warning, and the plane returns safely to the airfield. Savage is therefore exonerated of pilot error as the chain of circumstances caused the accident.

== Cast ==
- Glenn Ford as Sam McBane
- Nancy Kwan as Sally Fraser
- Rod Taylor as Jack Savage
- Suzanne Pleshette as Martha Webster
- Jane Russell as Guest Star
- Constance Towers as Peg Burke
- Wally Cox as Ralph Bundy
- Nehemiah Persoff as Ben Sawyer
- Mark Stevens as Mickey Doolan
- Max Showalter as Dan Crawford
- Dorothy Malone as Lisa Bond (uncredited)
- Howard St. John as Mark Hutchins
- Robert J. Wilke as Stillman
- Bert Freed as Charles J. Dillon
- Dort Clark as Ted Wilson
- Mary Wickes as Mrs. Llewlyn
- Robert F. Simon as Proctor

== Production ==
Fate Is the Hunter was nominally based on the bestselling 1961 memoir of the same name by Ernest K. Gann, but the author was so disappointed with the film, which bore no relation to the book about Gann's own early flying career, that he asked to have his name removed from the credits. In his autobiography, A Hostage to Fortune, Gann wrote, "They obliged and, as a result, I deprived myself of the TV residuals, a medium in which the film played interminably". (Some prints of the film were released with Gann's name still in the opening credits immediately before that of Harold Medford, author of the screenplay.)

The "Consolidated Airways" jet aircraft used in the film, called "Blue Ribbon", was one of two fabricated from DC-7(B) donors, the second used to create the crash scene on the beach. The wings were reportedly removed and reversed, and a Boeing 707 nose cone along with "supersonic spike" were also added in order to achieve the appearance of a modern jet airliner. Modifications to the rear section of the aircraft included the addition of two nacelles to accommodate the simulated jet engines. A rear-mounted Boeing 707 spike-styled HF antenna isolator and antenna were added to the tail section.

An area of the Twentieth Century Fox back lot was converted into the tarmac, taxiway, and runway seen in the film. Because of the fear of litigation, it was reported that no airframe manufacturer or airline was willing to cooperate in the production of the film, making these steps necessary. The "Fate" aircraft was later used in the filming of an episode of the ABC television series Voyage to the Bottom of the Sea (1964–1968), and remained parked for several years on an overpass used for movie prop storage by the adjacent 20th Century Fox Studios.

== Reception ==
Bosley Crowther of The New York Times gave the movie a strongly negative review, writing that it would surely not be shown as in-flight entertainment and that "it might be better for airline travelers if they never see it anyplace." He called it "a stupid, annoying film".

Tony Mastroianni of the Cleveland Press reviewed the movie as "generally well-acted" and "melodramatic and sometimes suspenseful," while noting that its "series of minor situations that are important in revealing character are also very trivial and lacking in drama."

=== Box Office ===
According to Fox records, Fate Is the Hunter needed to earn $4,800,000 to break even and made $2,210,000.

=== Awards and honors ===
Fate Is the Hunter was nominated for a 1964 Academy Award for Best Cinematography. (Note: An excerpt from Fate Is the Hunter was used in the 1980 comedy film Airplane! The film is also mentioned in the 1995 JAG episode "Pilot Error"; the protagonist, who is the lead investigator in a mishap, relates the film's plot to his partner, comparing it to their current predicament.)

=== Similar Airbus A350 incidents ===
On November 9, 2019, and January 21, 2020, two Airbus A350 jetliners experienced in-flight engine shutdowns due to beverage spills on the cockpit center console in the area of the control panel for engine-start and aircraft monitor functions.

== See also ==
- List of American films of 1964
