= San Juan Preservation Trust =

- Formation: 1979; 47 years ago
- Type: Nonprofit
- Tax ID no.: 91-1078355
- Legal status: 501(c)(3)
- Headquarters: Friday Harbor, Washington
- Board President: Barbara Rosenkotter
- Executive Director: Angela Anderson
- Board of directors: Erik Anderson; Willy Borner; Tom Cowan; David Duggins; Geoff Dunbar; Charles Givens; Nacy Greene; Jack Gorban; Sarah Hart; Peter Kalpatrick; Judy Meyer; Mary Miller; Joann Otto; Michael Popiwny; Barbara Rosenkotter; Phil Sherburne; Camille Uhlir
- Website: https://sjpt.org/

The San Juan Preservation Trust is a private, non-profit and membership-based land trust dedicated to helping people and communities conserve land on the San Juan Islands in Washington state. Noted for its $6.4 million purchase of Vendovi Island in 2010 and its $18.5 million acquisition of Turtleback Mountain on Orcas Island in 2006, the Preservation Trust has permanently protected 270 properties, 38 miles of shoreline and 16,000 acres on 20 islands, including land now managed as public parks, nature preserves, wildlife habitat, and working farms and forests. The organization was founded in 1979. The first transaction of the trust was made by Ernest K. Gann and Dodie Post Gann in 1980, when they donated 38 acres of their farm as a working agriculture preserve.
