= The High and the Mighty (novel) =

1953 novel by Ernest Kellogg Gann

- First edition
- Author: Ernest Kellogg Gann
- Language: English
- Publisher: William Sloane Associates
- Publication date: 1953
- Publication place: United States
- Media type: Print (Hardcover, Paperback)
- Pages: 342
- ISBN: 0-688-01786-X

The High and the Mighty is a 1953 novel by Ernest K. Gann about an airline flight from Honolulu to San Francisco. Just past the halfway point, or the point of no return, the flight has a catastrophic engine failure puncturing the wing and fuel tanks. As the flight crew struggles to get the damaged airliner to safety, human drama unfolds for both the crew and passengers.

The High and the Mighty spent 57 weeks on The New York Times Best Seller list, from May 1953 to June 1954, peaking out at number three. The success of the novel led to the creation of a 1954 film directed by William A. Wellman and starring John Wayne and Robert Stack. The novel/film is considered the original "airline disaster" story, sparking a new genre of film with the likes of the Airport movie series and the spoof comedy Airplane! series. The novel won the silver medal at the Commonwealth Club of California's 23rd Annual California Book Awards for 1953 fiction.

== Plot summary ==
In Honolulu, a DC-4 airliner operated as TOPAC Flight 420 prepares to takeoff for San Francisco with 16 passengers and a crew of five. Former captain Dan Roman, the flight's veteran first officer known for his habit of whistling, is haunted by a takeoff crash in South America that killed his wife and son and left him with a permanent limp. 420's captain, Sullivan, suffers from a secret fear of responsibility after logging thousands of hours looking after the lives of passengers and crew. Young second officer Hobie Wheeler and veteran navigator Lenny Wilby are contrasts in age and experience. Stewardess Spalding attends her passengers, each with varying personal problems, and befriends the terminally ill Frank Briscoe after being charmed by his pocket watch. A last minute arrival, businessman Humphrey Agnew, soon causes her misgivings by his strange behavior.

After a routine departure, 420 experiences sporadic sudden vibrations. Although the crew senses that something may be wrong with the propellers, they cannot locate a problem. When a vibration causes Spalding to burn her hand, Dan inspects the tail compartment but still finds nothing amiss. After nightfall, as the plane passes the point of no return, Agnew confronts fellow passenger Ken Childs, accusing him of having an affair with Agnew's wife. The men struggle and Agnew pulls out a gun, intending to shoot Childs, but before he can do so, the plane swerves violently when it loses a propeller and the engine catches fire. The crew quickly extinguishes the fire, but the engine has twisted off its mounting. In mid-ocean, the crew radios for help, assisted by an amateur radio operator aboard the steamer S.S. Cristobal Trader, and sets in motion a rescue operation. Dan discovers that the airliner is losing fuel from damage to a wing tank and that as a result, along with adverse winds and the drag of the damaged engine, the plane will eventually run out of fuel and be forced to ditch.

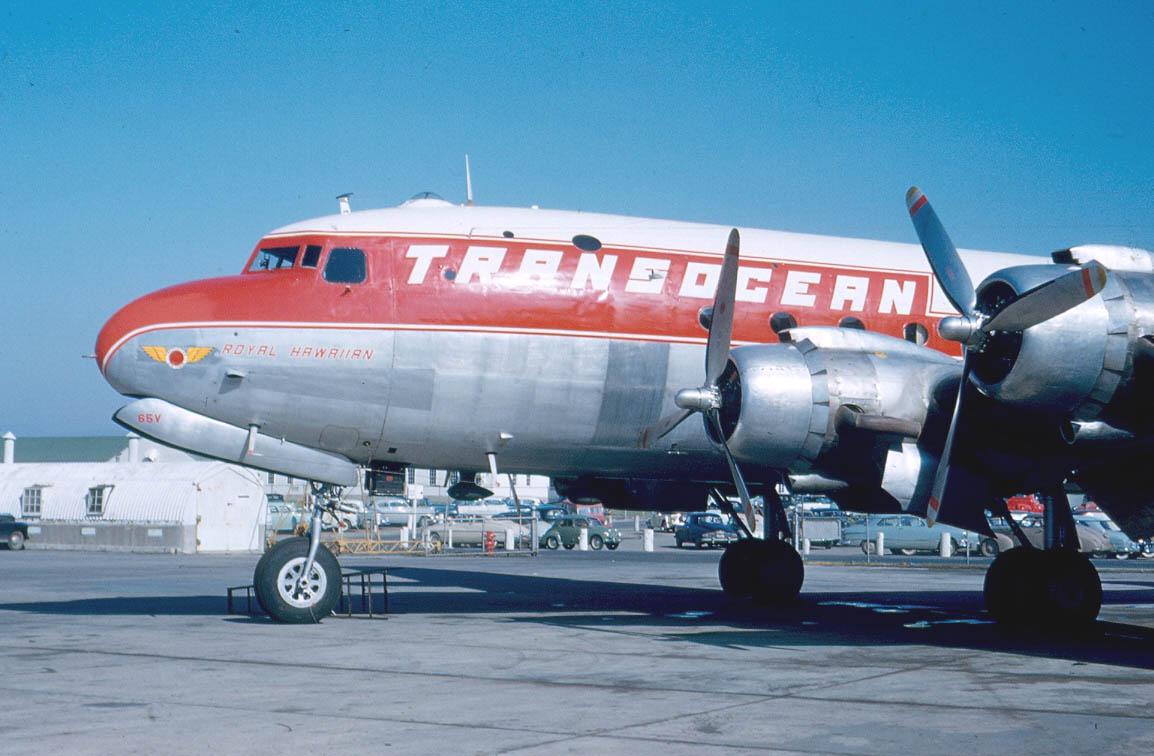
A Douglas DC-4 operated by Transocean Air Lines. Though the plane and airline in the novel are unnamed, this was the probable inspiration.

Unassuming fisherman José Locota disarms Agnew and confiscates the gun, compelling him to sit quietly. Broadway producer Gustave Pardee, who up until now has made no secret of his fear of flying, inspires calm in his terrified fellow passengers. Dan calmly explains the situation, trying to lessen their anxiety, but warns that their chances of making the coast are "one in a thousand." The passengers rally around each other and find changed perspectives about their existing problems. In San Francisco, Operations Manager Tim Garfield, who redeemed Roman's career by hiring him at TOPAC, arrives at the airline's operations center but is not sanguine about their chances. A favorable change in the winds and the arrival of a Coast Guard rescue B-17 to escort them raises the crew's hopes that they have just enough fuel to reach San Francisco. Wilby, however, discovers that in his nervousness he made an elementary error in navigation and their actual remaining time in the air is less than he originally calculated.

Garfield sends Sullivan a suggestion for conserving fuel that he fears Sullivan will disregard as disparaging his flying ability. Dan's experience tells him that their luck would be better trying to make land than ditching in the rough seas at night, and he recognizes that fear rather than judgment is governing Sullivan's decisions. When Sullivan panics and prepares to ditch immediately, Dan slaps him back to his senses. Dan adjusts the controls without Sullivan's permission to save gas. A recalculation of the remaining fuel convinces Dan the fuel supply is barely sufficient to reach San Francisco if the tail winds continue to increase, which persuades Sullivan to make the gamble.

As the airliner approaches rain-swept San Francisco in the middle of the night and at a perilously low altitude, the airport prepares for an emergency instrument landing. The plane narrowly surmounts the city's hills and breaks out of the clouds with the runway lights dead ahead, guiding them to a safe landing. As the passengers disembark, Garfield watches their reactions from the shadows of the terminal as they are harried by inquisitive reporters. After the tumult dies down, he joins the crew inspecting the damaged airplane and informs Dan that only thirty gallons of gas remained in their tanks. Dan acknowledges the gamble they took and walks away. "So long...you ancient pelican," Garfield mutters to his disappearing form.

== Author's airline background ==
The novel draws upon Gann's experiences as a commercial airline pilot. A similar story is chronicled in Gann's memoir Fate is the Hunter. On a Matson Airlines DC-4 flight from Honolulu to Burbank, the stewardess complained of a sporadic vibration that was rattling the dishes and silverware in the rear of the plane. Gann inspected the tail compartment and noticed nothing amiss, attributing the vibration to a problem with number 3 engine. After landing, the vibration was eventually traced to a missing elevator hinge bolt on the tail flight controls, a problem that had caused the crash of similar DC-4's. However, through a series of fortunate decisions about speed and altitude, his flight arrived safely avoiding the "fate" of those other DC-4 flights.

== Publication information ==
- Gann, Ernest K. (1953). The High and the Mighty. New York: William Sloane Associates, Inc. LCCN 53005252.
- Gann, Ernest K. The High and the Mighty. New York, N.Y.: William Morrow & Co, 1953
- Gann, Ernest K. The High and the Mighty. London: Hodder & Stoughton, 1954
- Gann, Ernest K. The High and the Mighty. New York, N.Y.: Permabooks, 1954
- Gann, Ernest K. The High and the Mighty. London: Hodder & Stoughton, Second UK Paperback Printing, 1956
