= Fate Is the Hunter =

1961 aviation memoir

- First edition
- Author: Ernest Kellogg Gann
- Cover artist: Paul Bacon
- Language: English
- Publisher: Simon & Schuster
- Publication date: 1961
- Publication place: United States
- Media type: Print (Hardcover, Paperback)
- Pages: 390
- ISBN: 0-671-63603-0

Fate Is the Hunter is a 1961 memoir by aviation writer Ernest K. Gann. It describes his years working as a pilot from the 1930s to 1950s, starting at American Airlines in Douglas DC-2s and DC-3s when civilian air transport was in its infancy, moving onto wartime flying in C-54s, C-87s, and Lockheed Lodestars, and finally at Matson Navigation's short-lived upstart airline and various post-World War II "nonscheduled" airlines in Douglas DC-4s.

On its publication, in reviewing the book, Martin Caidin wrote that Gann's reminiscences "stand excitingly as individual chapter-stories, but the author has woven them superbly into a lifetime of flight." Roger Bilstein, in a history of flight, says that of books that discuss airline operations from the pilot's point of view, "few works of this genre equal E. K. Gann's 'Fate Is the Hunter,' which strikingly evokes the atmosphere of air transport flying during the 1930s." In 2019, playwright David Mamet, a pilot himself, wrote that Fate Is the Hunter is "the best book written about aviation".

The plot of the 1964 film Fate Is the Hunter had no relation to the book. Gann had written some early drafts of the script, but was so unhappy with the final result that he asked to have his name removed from it. In his autobiography, A Hostage to Fortune, Gann wrote, "They obliged and as a result I deprived myself of the TV residuals, a medium in which the film played interminably."

The plot of Gann's fictional book The High and the Mighty bears some resemblance to one of the true stories in Fate Is the Hunter. On a flight from Hawaii to Burbank, California, the stewardess complained of a vibration that was rattling the dishes and silverware at the rear of the plane. Gann inspected the tail compartment and noticed nothing amiss. The vibration was later traced to a missing elevator hinge bolt, which could have led to aerodynamic unporting and a loss of control. However, Gann was eager to begin his vacation the next day and flew at a higher than expected airspeed, holding the elevator in place.

Another fictional book by Gann, Island in the Sky, is also based on a true story told in Fate Is the Hunter. The book was also made into a movie of the same name.
