= Samuel M. Ralston =

American politician (1857–1925)

Samuel Moffett Ralston
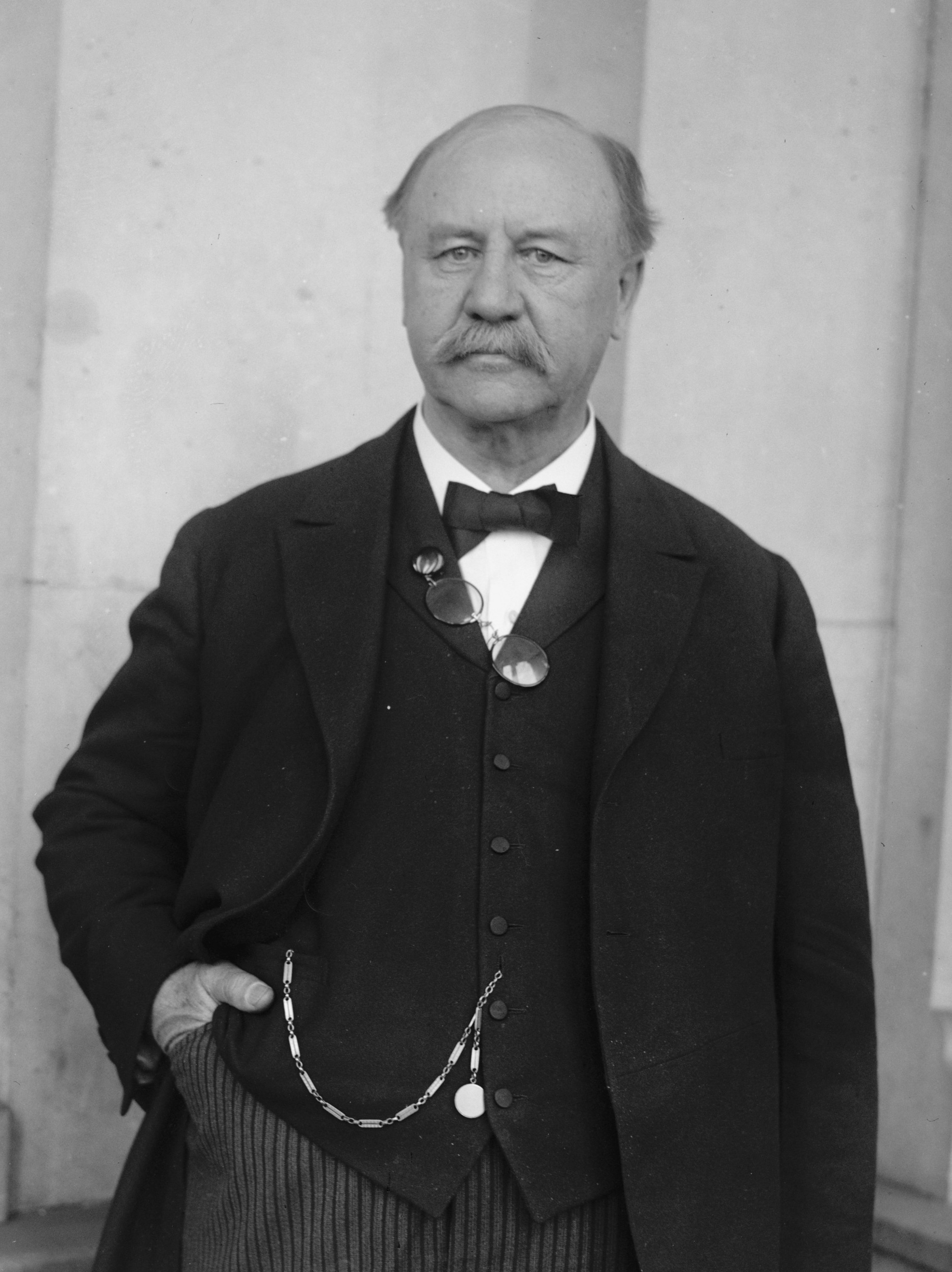
- Ralston in 1923

United States Senator from Indiana
- In office March 4, 1923 – October 14, 1925
- Preceded by: Harry Stewart New
- Succeeded by: Arthur Raymond Robinson

28th Governor of Indiana
- In office January 13, 1913 – January 8, 1917
- Lieutenant: William P. O'Neill
- Preceded by: Thomas R. Marshall
- Succeeded by: James P. Goodrich

Personal details
- Born: December 1, 1857 New Cumberland, Ohio, U.S.
- Died: October 14, 1925 (aged 67) Indianapolis, Indiana, U.S.
- Party: Democratic
- Spouses: Mary Josephine Backous (m. 1881; died 1882) Jennie Craven (m. 1889)
- Children: 3
- Education: Central Indiana Normal College
- Profession: Coal miner Teacher; Lawyer

Samuel Moffett Ralston (December 1, 1857 – October 14, 1925) was an American politician of the Democratic Party who served as the 28th governor of the U.S. state of Indiana and a United States senator from Indiana.

Born into a large impoverished family, he took many jobs as a child including working in a coal mine. He taught school and studied law, becoming a prominent state lawyer before becoming active in his local politics. Because he served during the state's 100th anniversary he is sometimes called the Indiana's "Centennial Governor". During his tenure as governor, he was responsible for implementing many Progressive Era reforms in the state and put down the Indianapolis streetcar strike of 1913. He gained the support of the Indiana Ku Klux Klan for his anti-Catholic political positions, and with their support was elected to the U.S. Senate in 1922. Ralston had become popular among the national Democratic Party as an early front-runner for the presidential nomination in 1924, but he dropped out of the race because of his failing health, and died the next year.

== Early life ==
=== Family and background ===
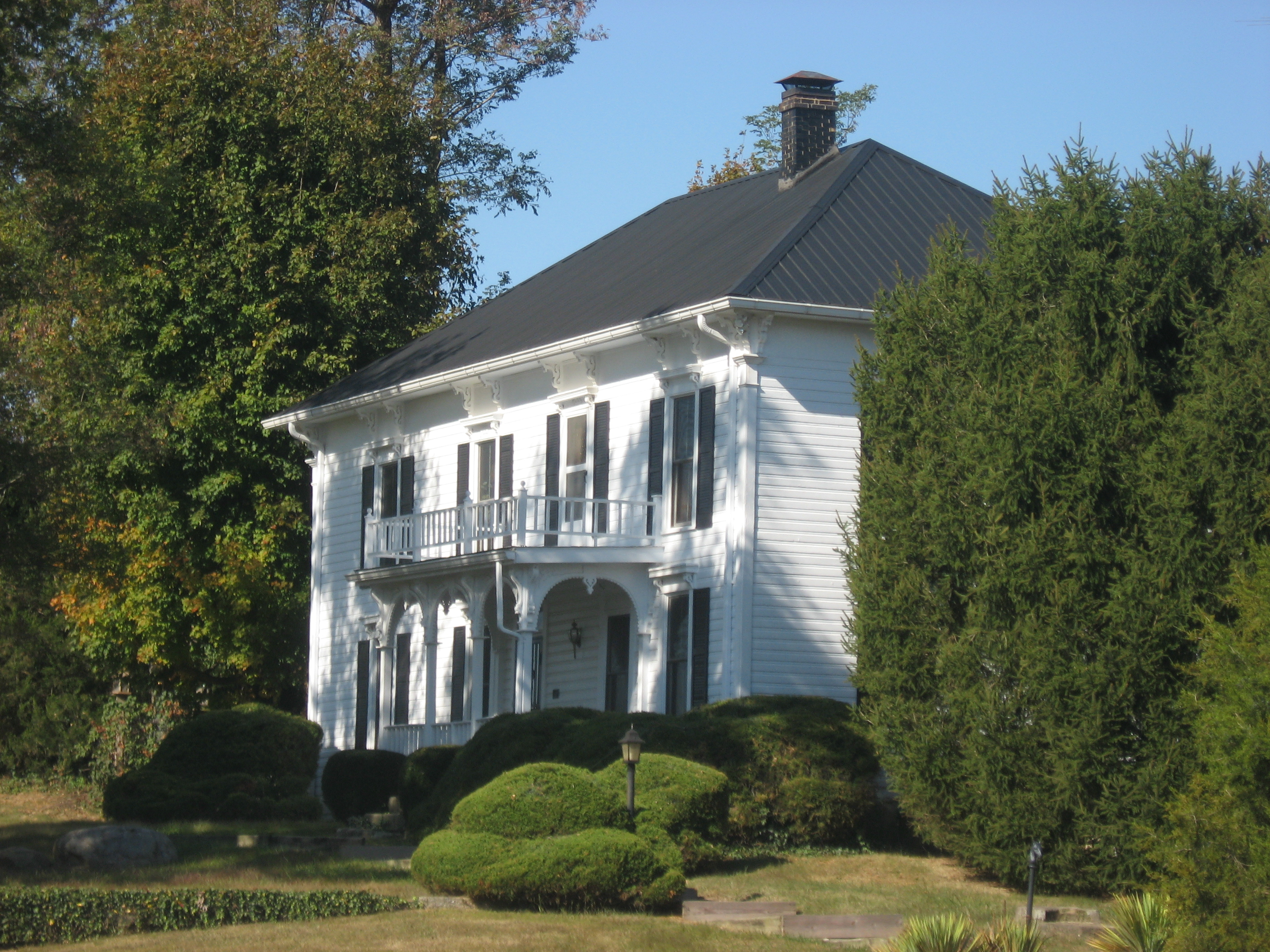
Ralston's childhood home in Owen County

Samuel Ralston was born near New Cumberland, Ohio, on December 1, 1857, the second child of John and Sarah Ralston. He was of Scottish descent, his great-grandparents immigrated to Pennsylvania in about 1760. His older brother John had died at age three, shortly before Samuel's birth. In 1865 the Ralston family moved to Owen County, Indiana, where John purchased a large farm and began to raise livestock. His boyhood home, the Moffett-Ralston House, was listed on the National Register of Historic Places in 1975.

Ralston, and his three brothers and four sisters, worked on the family farm to help the family subsist. The family suffered from financial difficulty and lost their farm in 1873, they then moved to Fontanet, Indiana. He took up employment in a butcher shop and later worked in a coal mine to help provide income for the family. His father later opened a butcher shop of his own returning the family to prosperity.

=== Education ===
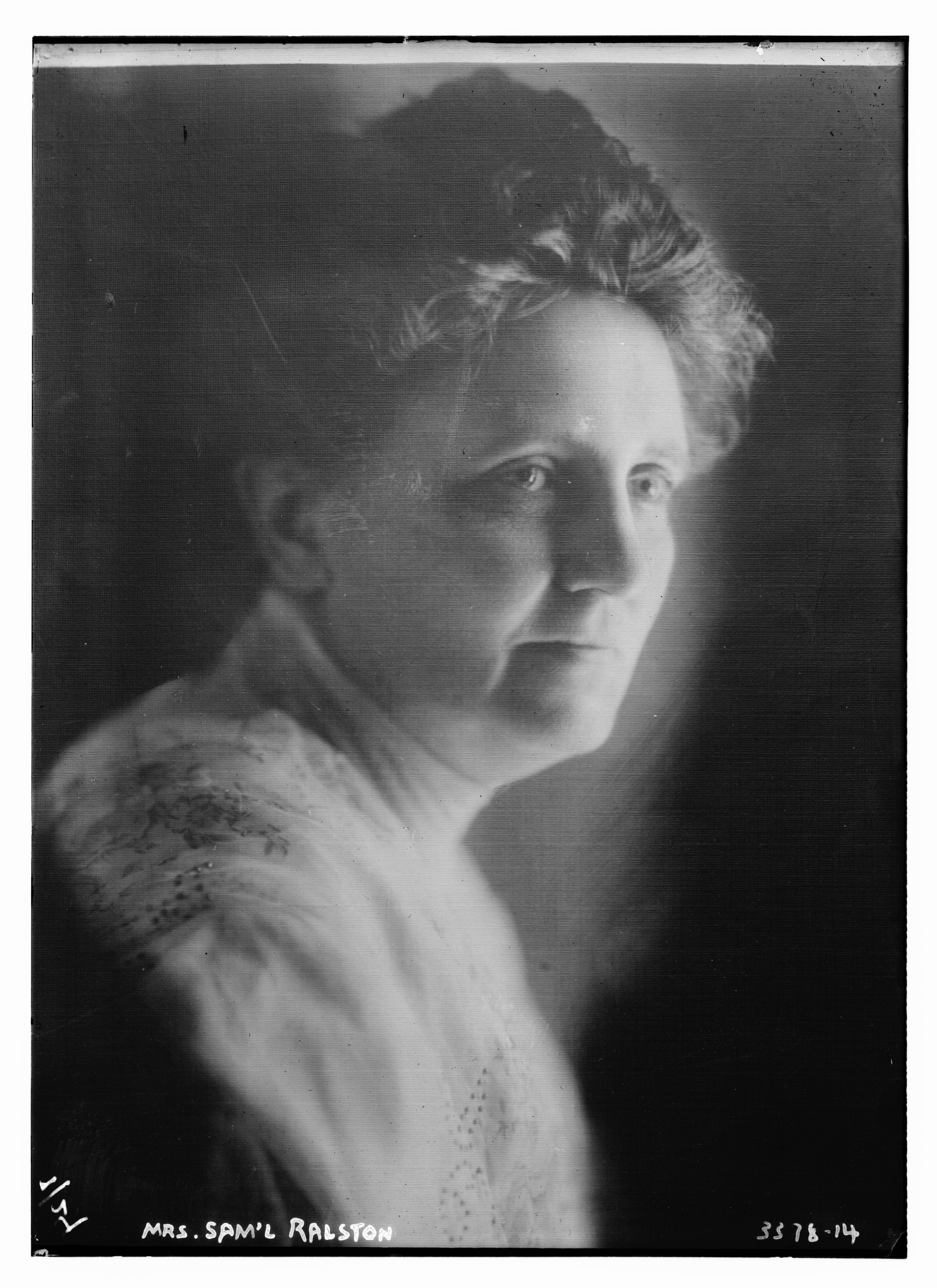
Jennie Ralston née Craven, c. 1910–1915

As a boy he attended public school in Owen County, Indiana. As he grew older, he began working as a school teacher during the winter months while attending college during the summer. After completing high school he married Mary Josephine Backous on December 26, 1881; she died six months later. Ralston graduated from Central Indiana Normal College in Danville, Indiana, in 1884 having completed a scientific course, but was interested in learning law after attending trial as a spectator. Ralston read law in the office of Robinson & Fowler. Unable to afford boarding, he spent several months sleeping on the sofa of the law office. He began a formal course in September 1884 and was admitted to the bar on January 1, 1886. In June he opened a law practice in Lebanon, Indiana, with partner John A. Abbott, there he remained for several years. He became well known in the state for skills, and was soon one of Indiana's preeminent lawyers, mostly representing businesses.

While attending college he met Jennie Craven and began courting her. The couple later married on December 30, 1889. Together they had three children, Emmet, Julian, and Ruth. The family was Presbyterian and attended church regularly. Ralston had also become a member of the Young Men's Democratic Club and took an interest in politics and began stumping on behalf of Democrat candidates.

=== Early campaigns ===
Ralston had been a Democrat for all of his adult life. Living in a Republican-dominated area, he had a difficult time to obtain political office. He ran for the Indiana State Senate in 1888 but was defeated. In 1896 and 1898 he ran for Indiana Secretary of State but was defeated both times. During his times running for office, he became friends with party boss Thomas Taggart. Taggart attempted to have Ralston nominated to run for governor in 1908 because of Ralston's anti-prohibition position, but was defeated at the party convention by prohibitionist and future Vice President of the United States Thomas R. Marshall. In 1908, Ralston was elected President of the Lebanon School Board and served until 1911, his first election victory.

== Governor ==
In 1912 Taggart again supported Ralston's nomination for Governor, and this time succeed and was nominated on March 17. Ralston received the endorsement of numerous groups in the state, including the women's suffrage movement and many churches. Ralston won the general election by plurality and became the Governor of Indiana on January 13, 1913, defeating Progressive candidate Albert Beveridge, and the Republican candidate former Governor Winfield T. Durbin.

=== Indianapolis riots ===
One of the first events Ralston became involved in was a strike by the street car workers in Indianapolis that began in October. The strike was called on the week of the city elections and Republicans accused the strikers of trying to prevent them from voting. The union demanded the passage of a law to better protect what they believed to be their rights and wanted the governor to call a special session of the Indiana General Assembly to pass such a bill. The strike quickly grew into a citywide riot as the growing mob began to attack police, business leaders, and public officials. Business leaders and Mayor of Indianapolis Samuel Shank demanded the governor call out the army and end the strike, but the unions threatened violence if that happened. On November 5 Ralston finally called out the entire Indiana National Guard and put the city under martial law. At noon on the 6th, the strikers and their sympathizers gathered around the Indiana Statehouse and began chanting a demand that the troops leave the city. Ralston exited the building and spoke to the crowd offering to withdraw the troops if the strikers would go back to work and negotiate peacefully. He offered concessions and promises that convinced the strikers of his good intentions, which effectively ended the strike that day. After several days passed, and it became apparent that the strike was truly over, he demobilized the guard.

When the General Assembly convened, Ralston was able to have several acts passed that led to improved working conditions for many workers in the state. Among the laws he advocated and passed were acts banning the sale of narcotic drugs for the first time, a minimum wage, conservation measures to prevent deforestation, incentives to encourage development of the livestock industry, free vaccinations for several prevalent diseases, and aid in helping the blind find work. His signature work though was his target of the tenement slums in the state. He successfully lobbied for funds to provide running clean water, children's playgrounds, and several other improvements to the living conditions of the urban poor. The final bill he signed empowered the state police to close the brothels in the state, which effectively ended any forms of legal prostitution in Indiana.

=== Progressive agenda ===
Described as “moderately liberal” and “genuinely liberal in thought and action” Ralston presided over a wide range of progressive social reforms during his time as governor. Thomas R. Marshall, Ralston's predecessor, had attempted to have a new constitution adopted but his plans were ruled unconstitutional by the Indiana Supreme Court who ruled a constitutional convention needed to be held. Ralston also favored creating a new constitution to enact numerous reforms that under the present constitution would have been illegal. To accomplish this goal, he began urging the General Assembly to call a constitutional convention. A bill was passed by the assembly in 1913 to permit the state to adopt a new constitution. The measure had to be submitted to a statewide referendum, as required by the current constitution, before the convention could be held. Outside of Indianapolis and the few industrial cities, there was little support for reform for industrial workers, the majority of the state's population was still rural. When the public voted in 1914, the measure was defeated, 235,140–338,947.

His two projects with the longest impact on the state were the Utilities Law and the Vocational Education Act. Ralston advocated and obtained significant increases in education spending and began a system of free vocational education for the state's school students. The regulations he enacted on the public utility companies began a process that would take running water and electricity to the entire state. The state park system and the Indiana Department of Natural Resources were created along with several state parks. Carl G. Fisher lobbied Ralston to help him promote the creation of a large highway project. At his urging, Ralston helped launch an ambitious project to build a major inter-state highway. He arranged a meeting of seven governors and was able to sell them on a plan to build a highway throughout their states connecting Jacksonville, Florida, with Chicago, Illinois, with each state funding its portion of the road. About twenty percent of the road's length would run through Indiana. The road was largest highway project in the United States up until that point, and resulted in the creation of the Dixie Highway, now US-31. Other important measures were passed during his term including Indiana's first worker's compensation program, the creation of the state's primary election system, and the creation of an inheritance tax.

He also made substantial contributions to the state's financial situation. The state had been in debt since the start of the internal improvements in the early 1830s and had twice verged on total bankruptcy, in 1847 and 1863, and once entered a partial bankruptcy in 1841. Although the state was not in immediate financial risk, it was still heavily burdened by debt. Ralston was insistent on paying off the state's debt and creating a rainy day fund, and advocated amending the constitution to prevent the state from borrowing funds in the future. Through a combination of spending cuts and increased taxation and with the support of the General Assembly, the government was able to pay off the entire state debt and create a $3.76 million surplus fund by the time he left office.

=== World War I ===
As the United States entered World War I, Ralston was called on by United States President Woodrow Wilson to help ready Indiana's levies. Numerous regiments, totaling more than 130,000 men, were mustered in Indiana and sent overseas in the state's largest deployment since the American Civil War. With most of the Indiana National Guard out of the state, Ralston reactivated the Indiana Legion, which had recently been renamed the Liberty Guard, an organization that had not seen action since the American Civil War. In 1916 tensions began to increase between the United States and Mexico and there was a possibility of war. The majority of the American forces were at that time in Europe, and Wilson requested Ralston to mobilize a full brigade of Hoosiers to defend the Mexican border. It was the largest single unit call the state had responded to, as the federal government typically only called out regiments. Several thousand men were quickly assembled and dispatched to the border.

Historians note that Ralston had one of the most eventful terms in the state's history, and faced more challenges than any governor, except for Oliver Morton. The state constitution prevented him from seeking a second term as governor, and he left office on January 8, 1917, after delivering a farewell address and urging the General Assembly to adopt additional progressive legislation that he was unable to have passed during his term.

== U.S. Senator ==
Ralston campaigned for the United States Senate beginning in 1922. Because of his friendly relationship with the Indiana branch of the Ku Klux Klan, he was able to get their endorsement. Ralston delivered a speech at St. Mary's of the Woods where he condemned religious interference in state affairs. The Klan's primary goals at the time were to remove all Catholic influence from the government and public schools, and to shut down Catholic private schools. His speech earned him considerable popularity among the group who said he "was not afraid to tell off the papists to their faces." The Klan was one of the most influential groups within the state at the time, and it reprinted and circulated his speech. The Klan's support of Ralston was one of its most forceful attempts to have a candidate elected in Indiana, as it feared the Republican candidate who had publicly condemned the organization. The Klan fell apart in 1926—the year after Ralston's death—after a scandal, revealing that the majority of Indiana's politicians, including Ralston, had ties to the Klan.

Ralston won election to the United States Senate from Indiana, defeating Albert Beveridge in November 1922. The New York Times ran a lengthy story on his wife, referring to her as a "Chicken Farmer" because she was reluctant to move to Washington, D.C., she did not want to leave her chickens unattended. He took up his Senate seat on March 4, 1923. In the senate he advocated the adoption of the Mellon tax plan, which was effectively a wealth redistribution plan.

In 1924 Ralston was expected to be the Democratic presidential nominee but, for reasons he did not reveal at the time, he dropped out of the race just before the convention. Despite Ralston's withdrawal, his ally and friend Thomas Taggart seemed about to enable Ralston's nomination as a compromise to resolve the McAdoo-Smith deadlock when Ralston told Taggart to discontinue the effort. After the Klan became more powerful than ever in 1924, Ralston fought against efforts to condemn the Klan by name in both the Indiana and national Democratic platforms. Due in part to Ralston's efforts, the anti-Klan plank at the national Democratic convention failed by one vote. At the state convention, Ralston's efforts succeeded at preventing the Klan from technically being denounced by name in the platform. However, the state Democratic party still passed a plank that declared that the Indiana Republican Party had ""been delivered into the hands of an organization which has no place in politics and which promulgates doctrines which tend to break down the safeguards which the Constitution throws around every citizen" and that 1920s Indiana Republicans were "repungant" to Civil War/Reconstruction Republicans such as Abraham Lincoln and Oliver Morton.

Ralston later revealed that due to his failing health he did not believe he was fit to become president. His steadily worsening health led to his death on October 14, 1925, at his home near Indianapolis. He was buried in the Oak Hill Cemetery in Lebanon.

== Electoral history ==
Indiana gubernatorial election, 1912
Party	Candidate	Votes	%
Democratic	Samuel M. Ralston	275,357	48.1
Progressive	Albert J. Beveridge	166,124	28.6
Republican	Winfield T. Durbin	142,850	26.7
Prohibition	Leonard M. Christ	22,352	3.1

1922 U.S. Senate election in Indiana
Party	Candidate	Votes	%	±%
Democratic	Samuel M. Ralston	558,169	50.87%	▲4.73
Republican	Albert J. Beveridge	524,558	47.80%	▲0.03
Socialist	William Henry	14,635	1.33%	▼1.73
Total votes		1,097,362	100.00%	
Democratic gain from Republican				

== See also ==
- List of members of the United States Congress who died in office (1900–1949)
- List of governors of Indiana

== Bibliography ==
- Hoy, Suellen Monica. "Samuel M. Ralston, Progressive Governor" 1913–1917" (PhD dissertation, Indiana University; ProQuest Dissertations & Theses, 1975. 7523478).
- Chalmers, David Mark (1984). Hooded Americanism: the history of the Ku Klux Klan. Duke University Press. ISBN 0-8223-0772-3.
- Dunn, Jacob Piatt (1919). Indiana and Indianans. Vol. III. Chicago & New York: American Historical Society.
- Kettleborough, Charles & Bremer, John A (1916). Constitution Making in Indiana: A Source Book of Constitutional Documents, with Historical Introduction and Critical Notes. Indiana Historical Commission.
- Gugin, Linda C.; St. Clair, James E, eds. (2006). The Governors of Indiana. Indianapolis, Indiana: Indiana Historical Society Press. ISBN 0-87195-196-7.

Party political offices
Preceded by Thomas R. Marshall	Democratic nominee for Governor of Indiana; 1912	Succeeded by John A. M. Adair
Preceded by John W. Kern	Democratic nominee for United States Senator from Indiana (Class 1); 1922	Succeeded by Evans Woollen
Political offices
Preceded by Thomas R. Marshall	Governor of Indiana; January 13, 1913 – January 8, 1917	Succeeded by James P. Goodrich
U.S. Senate
Preceded by Harry S. New	U.S. senator (Class 1) from Indiana; March 4, 1923 – October 14, 1925; Served alongside: James E. Watson	Succeeded by Arthur Raymond Robinson
