= 1912 Indiana gubernatorial election =

- November 5, 1912
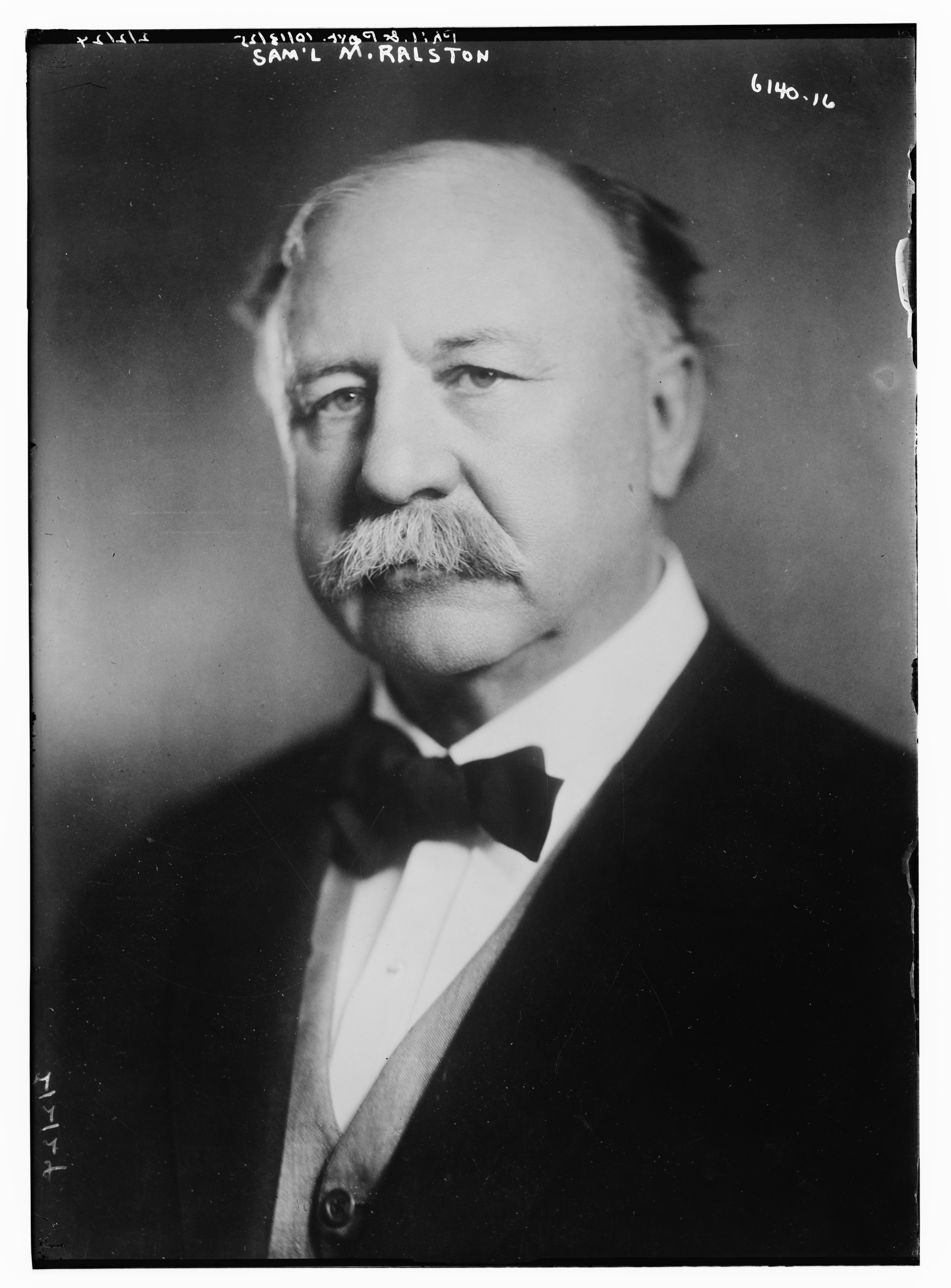

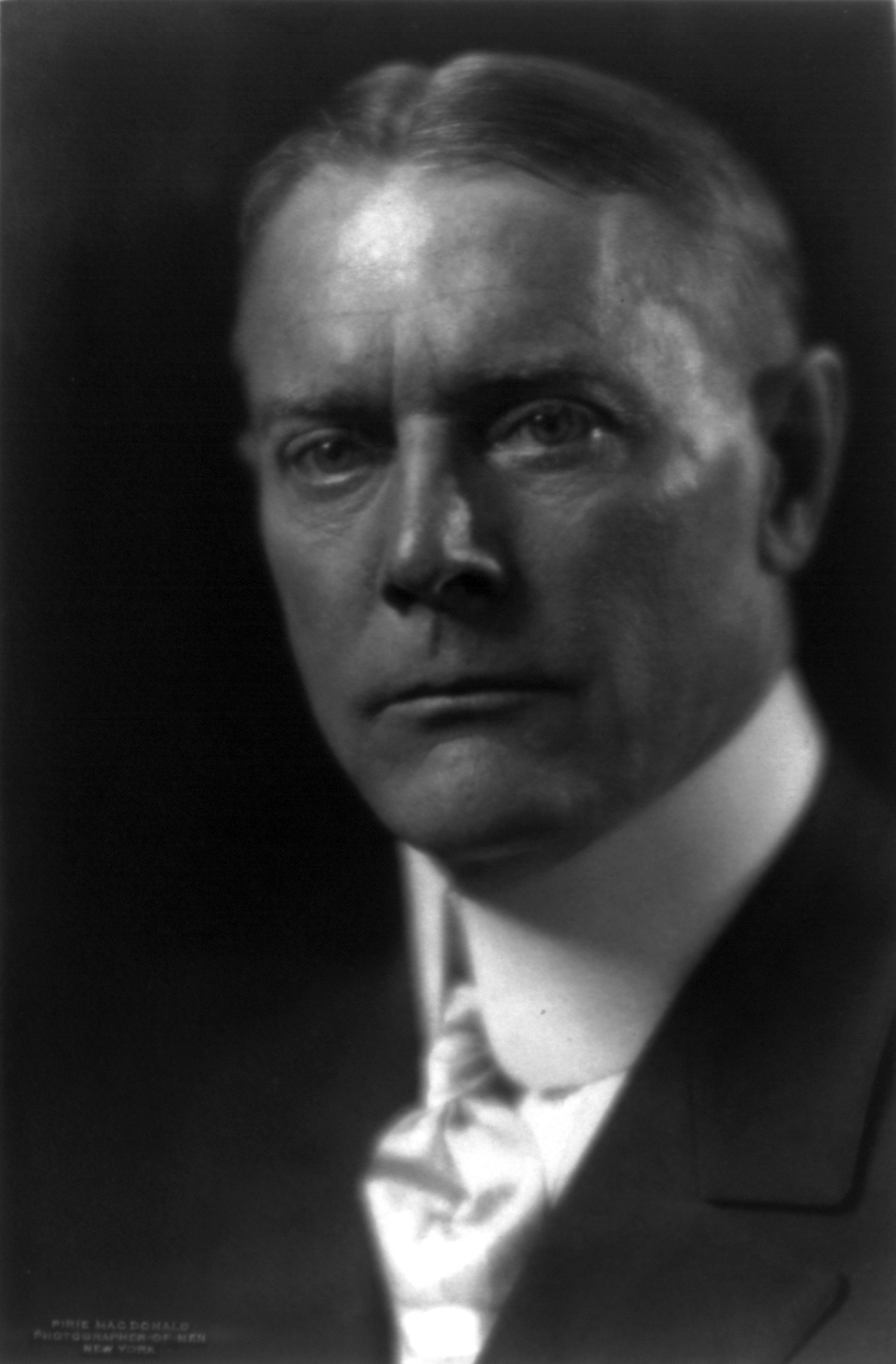

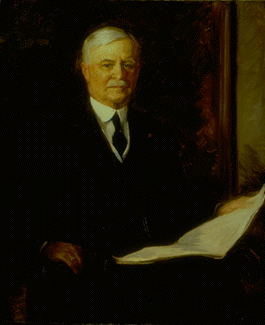

Nominee	Samuel M. Ralston	Albert J. Beveridge
Party	Democratic	Progressive
Popular vote	275,357	166,654
Percentage	42.95%	25.99%
Nominee	Winfield T. Durbin	Stephen N. Reynolds
Party	Republican	Socialist
Popular vote	141,684	35,464
Percentage	22.10%	5.53%
- County results Ralston: 30–40% 40–50% 50–60% 60–70% Beveridge: 30–40% 40–50% Durbin: 30–40% 40–50%
Governor before election
Thomas R. Marshall
Democratic
Elected Governor
Samuel M. Ralston
Democratic

The 1912 Indiana gubernatorial election was held on November 5, 1912. Democratic nominee Samuel M. Ralston defeated Progressive nominee Albert J. Beveridge and Republican nominee Winfield T. Durbin with 42.95% of the vote. The vote splitting between the Republican and Progressive nominees benefited Democrat Ralston tremendously in this election.

== General election ==
=== Candidates ===
Major party candidates

- Samuel M. Ralston, Democratic, President of the Lebanon School Board
- Winfield T. Durbin, Republican, former Governor (1901–1905)

Other candidates

- Albert J. Beveridge, Progressive, former U.S. Senator (1899–1911)
- Stephen N. Reynolds, Socialist
- William H. Hickman, Prohibition
- James Matthews, Socialist Labor

=== Results ===
1912 Indiana gubernatorial election
Party	Candidate	Votes	%	±%
Democratic	Samuel M. Ralston	275,357	42.95%	
Progressive	Albert J. Beveridge	166,654	25.99%	
Republican	Winfield T. Durbin	141,684	22.10%	
Socialist	Stephen N. Reynolds	35,464	5.53%	
Prohibition	William H. Hickman	18,454	2.88%	
Socialist Labor	James Matthews	2,884	0.45%	
Majority		108,703		
Turnout				
Democratic hold		Swing		
