= Patterns of Force =

- Star Trek: The Original Series episode
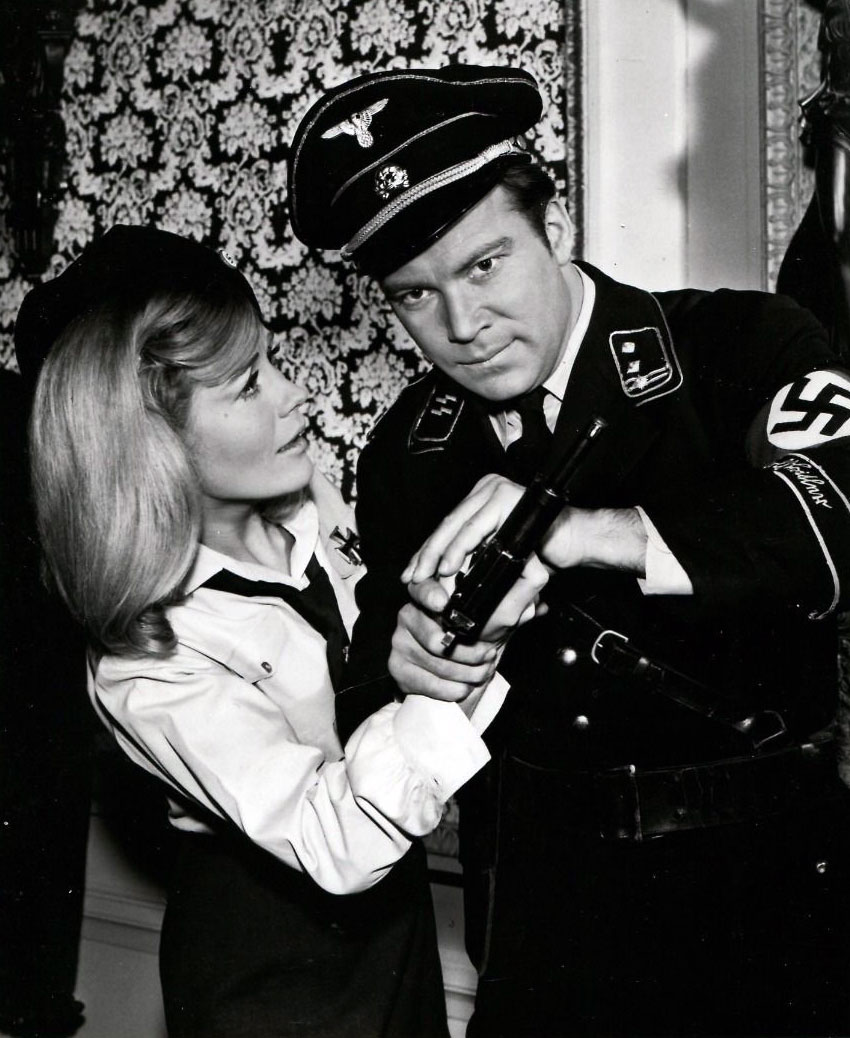
- Kirk in a Nazi uniform with Daras, an Ekosian resistance member
- Episode no.: Season 2 Episode 21
- Directed by: Vincent McEveety
- Written by: John Meredyth Lucas
- Cinematography by: Jerry Finnerman
- Production code: 052
- Original air date: February 16, 1968

Guest appearances
- David Brian – Professor/Führer John Gill; Chuck Courtney – Davod; Skip Homeier – Deputy Führer Melakon; Richard Evans – Isak; Patrick Horgan – Chairman Eneg; Valora Noland – Daras; William Wintersole – Abrom; Paul Baxley – First Trooper; Peter Canon – Gestapo Lieutenant; Gilbert Green – S.S. Major; Bartell LaRue – Nazi Newscaster; Ralph Maurer – S.S. Lieutenant; Ed McCready – S.S. Trooper; Eddie Paskey – Trooper; William Blackburn – Lt. Hadley / S.S. Trooper

Episode chronology
← Previous "Return to Tomorrow"	Next → "By Any Other Name"
- Star Trek: The Original Series season 2

"Patterns of Force" is the twenty-first episode of the second season of the American science-fiction television series Star Trek. Written by John Meredyth Lucas and directed by Vincent McEveety, it was first broadcast on NBC on February 16, 1968.

In the episode, the crew of the Enterprise tracks down a Federation observer on a planet dominated by a "Naziesque" regime.

This episode was banned on German television until 1995 due to the depiction of Nazi uniforms and presence of several different Nazi insignia.

== Plot ==
The starship Enterprise arrives at the planet Ekos to investigate the disappearance of a Federation cultural observer named John Gill, who was one of Captain Kirk's history professors at Starfleet Academy. The Enterprise enters orbit around Ekos and is attacked by a rocket armed with a thermonuclear warhead, technology that is too advanced to be from either Ekos or their neighboring planet, Zeon, two very different planets: Ekos is a warlike/anarchic society-while Zeon is a peaceful advanced society.

Kirk suspects Gill may be responsible for the introduction of advanced technology, which would mean that he has contaminated Ekosian culture and violated the Prime Directive. Kirk and First Officer Spock decide to beam down to the planet to investigate. Before they transport to the surface, Chief Medical Officer Dr. McCoy inserts subcutaneous emergency transponders, a type of homing device, into the forearms of each in the event they cannot use their communicators.

Upon their arrival, Kirk and Spock watch in horror as a Zeon is arrested by Ekosian soldiers dressed as brown-shirted Nazi Stormtroopers. An outdoor video newsreel shows an Ekosian rally featuring huge crowds shouting Nazi-style slogans and waving swastika-emblazoned flags. A female Nazi officer, Daras, is shown receiving a medal of honor: the Iron Cross, Second Class. The "Final Solution" is mentioned, meaning apparently the extinction of all Zeons on Ekos, as a prelude to the entire destruction of Zeon. The broadcast ends with the reporter making a Nazi salute to a picture of the Führer—whom the shocked Kirk recognizes as John Gill.

Startled and determined to contact Gill, Kirk and Spock steal uniforms and attempt to infiltrate the main headquarters, but are caught when Spock's ears are exposed. He and Kirk are tortured until Party Chairman Eneg orders them thrown in a cell for further interrogation. There they meet Isak, the Zeon prisoner they had seen arrested earlier.

The trio quickly engineer an escape using the rubindium crystals from Kirk and Spock's transponders as cutting-torch lasers and retrieve their communicators. Isak takes them to meet the underground resistance led by his brother Abrom. Suddenly, their hideout is raided, led by Daras, in what is quickly revealed as a ruse to test the strangers' loyalty. Daras is actually a resistance member who has infiltrated the government. Abrom explains that Deputy Führer Melakon is actually the de facto leader of Ekos; in turn, Kirk and Spock explain the situation from their perspective, and ask for help in locating Gill. They learn that the "Führer" is to make a speech that evening that will officially launch the "Final Solution".

To gain entrance to the broadcast center, the whole group pretends to be a film crew. They find Gill in a broadcasting booth surrounded by guards, seemingly dazed but beginning his speech. Kirk has Dr. McCoy beam down. He arrives in a cloakroom, where the party is discovered by a security team led by Chairman Eneg—who surprisingly does not seem to recognize them. After he leaves, Isak explains that Eneg is also a resistance member.

Sneaking into the broadcast booth, McCoy confirms Gill is heavily drugged. He administers a counteractive stimulant while Spock uses a Vulcan mind meld on Gill, which confirms that Melakon was responsible for Gill's condition. Barely coherent, Gill explains that he initially imposed a form of National Socialism upon the lawless Ekosians because he believed it to be the most efficient system of government ever devised. The system worked on Ekos until Melakon gained control and twisted it into a tool to wipe out Zeon.

Kirk makes Gill aware of the extent to which Ekos has progressed toward resembling Nazi Germany. Gill, now lucid enough to speak his own mind, renounces the "Final Solution", cancels the invasion of Zeon, and declares Melakon a traitor. Melakon grabs a submachine gun and opens fire on the broadcast booth, fatally wounding Gill. In retaliation, Isak shoots Melakon twice, killing him. Eneg and Daras, still officially respected party leaders, agree to "stop the bloodshed", and plan to announce the end of the Nazi regime. Eneg thanks Kirk for Starfleet's help, but asks them to leave, saying it is up to the two planets to rebuild themselves.

== Production ==
The V-2 rocket films were actual films and the clips of Hitler in a car were from the film Triumph of the Will (1935).

== Reception ==
=== German broadcast history ===
Because the episode contains Nazi uniforms and insignia, and features a character who makes the statement that Nazi Germany was the "most efficient society" ever created, it was considered unfit for entertainment in Germany under Strafgesetzbuch section 86a. Consequently, this episode is the only one which was not aired during either of the two original runs in Germany (on the public ZDF network in the mid-1970s and on the private Sat.1 network in the late 1980s/early 1990s). It was only dubbed into German in 1995, and was presented in the original English with subtitles in all earlier German releases. It was finally shown on German pay TV in 1996 and included on all DVD/Blu-ray season sets. On November 4, 2011, it was finally shown on the public network channel ZDFneo as well.
