= Marvin John Schwartz =

American film producer

Marvin John Schwartz (January 10, 1928 – September 3, 1997) was an American film producer and publicist. He began producing by optioning the novel Blindfold, which became a 1966 film.

Schwartz was born in the Bronx, New York, to Sol Schwartz and Minnie Siegel, Yiddish-speaking Jewish emigrants from Russia and Austria, respectively. His father worked in the garment industry cutting furs. He died in Boulder Creek, California.

In Quentin Tarantino's Once Upon a Time in Hollywood (2019), Al Pacino plays a character with a similar name, Marvin Schwarz, who is Rick Dalton’s talent agent.

== Select credits ==
- Blindfold (1966)
- The War Wagon (1967)
- 100 Rifles (1969)
- Hard Contract (1969)
- Tribes (1970)
- Welcome Home, Soldier Boys (1971)
- Kid Blue (1973)
