= Sex and the College Girl =

1964 American comedy film directed by Joseph Adler

- Directed by: Joseph Adler
- Written by: Joseph Adler; William A. Bairn; Warren Spector
- Starring: John Gabriel; Luana Anders; Julie Sommars; Charles Grodin; Richard Arlen; Valora Noland
- Cinematography: Floyd Crosby
- Music by: Robert N. Langworthy
- Release date: 1964
- Language: English

Sex and the College Girl (also known as The Fun Lovers) is a 1964 American comedy film directed by Joseph Adler and starring John Gabriel, Luana Anders and Charles Grodin.

== Plot ==
This is a "slice-of-life" film set primarily around a Puerto Rican luxury hotel frequented by young East Coast weekenders.

== Cast ==
- John Gabriel as Larry Devon
- Luana Anders as Gwen
- Charles Grodin as Bob
- Julie Sommars as Susan
- Richard Arlen as Charles Devon
- Valora Noland as Vickie
- William Kerwin as Tentor

== Reception ==
The film has been described as "a low-budget version of Sex and the Single Girl".
