= Tribes (film) =

- Jan-Michael Vincent and Darren McGavin
- Written by: Marvin Schwartz; Tracy Keenan Wynn
- Directed by: Joseph Sargent
- Starring: Darren McGavin; Earl Holliman; Jan-Michael Vincent
- Music by: Lionel Newman
- Country of origin: United States
- Original language: English

Production
- Producer: Marvin Schwartz
- Cinematography: Russell Metty
- Editor: Patrick Kennedy
- Running time: 90 minutes
- Production company: 20th Century-Fox Television

Original release
- Network: ABC
- Release: November 10, 1970

Tribes, also known as The Soldier Who Declared Peace (UK), is a 1970 American television drama film broadcast as an ABC Movie of the Week directed by Joseph Sargent. A big ratings success when it first aired November 10, 1970 (which happened to be the Marine Corps' 195th birthday), Tribes was later released theatrically in Britain and Europe under the title The Soldier Who Declared Peace. Tribes has been released on VHS, but as of 2018 has not been released on DVD.

== Plot ==
Private Adrian, a young United States Marine Corps Vietnam War-era draftee, despite being an anti-war hippie, reluctantly reports to boot camp to fulfill his duty as an American. Adrian excels as a leader, though his pacifist ideology presents continuing conflicts between himself and his superiors. Adrian's drill instructor, Gunnery Sergeant Thomas Drake quickly recognizes Adrian's leadership qualities, but is conflicted as he grows to respect Adrian while also realizing that he represents everything Adrian opposes. At one point, Adrian points out that his love of meditation is similar to Drake's drawing to relax, indicating a sketch of a flying bird. Both are ways of finding freedom. Drake responds angrily, denying that he had drawn the picture.

Throughout the training, Drake's superior, Chief Drill Instructor Master Sergeant Frank DePayster, takes an instant dislike to Adrian. Disciplinary problems with the platoon begin to arise as Adrian's influence on fellow recruits begins to have an impact on the effectiveness of Drake's instruction. DePayster repeatedly argues with Drake about Adrian, claiming that the fact that the man is performing all of his assigned tasks is not enough. He considers Adrian's attitude grounds enough for him to be set back and placed in the Motivational Platoon, a disciplinary unit for problem recruits. Drake disagrees and allows Adrian to continue training.

However, during a weekend pass in San Diego, Adrian becomes disenchanted with military life and exchanges his dress uniform for civilian clothes at an Army-Navy store. Drake tracks him down and brings him back to the base to continue training. DePayster, at odds with Drake's attitude toward Adrian, goes behind Drake's back and files a complaint against both Drake and Adrian with the Company commanding officer. Without Drake's approval, the commanding officer drops Adrian from the platoon and places him in the Motivational Platoon under DePayster, where he will effectively be "recycled" for an extended period of training time. Drake accuses DePayster of carrying out a personal vendetta, to which DePayster replies, "I'll forget I heard that."

Drake takes the drawing of the bird from his desk drawer and hangs it up, thus signifying his own method of rebellion and freedom. The platoon graduates without Adrian. As Drake awaits a new batch of recruits, DePayster informs him that Adrian went "over the hill" during the night.

== Cast ==
- Darren McGavin as Gunnery Sgt. Thomas Drake
- Earl Holliman as Master Sgt. Frank DePayster
- Jan-Michael Vincent as Adrian
- John Gruber as Quentin
- Danny Goldman as Sidney
- Richard Yniguez as Sanchez
- Antone Curtis as Marcellus
- Peter Hooten as Scrunch
- David Buchanan as Armstrong
- Ric Weaver as Morton

== Reception ==
Tribes received three Primetime Emmy Awards for Sound Editing (Don Hall, Jack Jackson, Bob Weatherford and Dick Jensen, sound editors), Film Sound Mixing (Theodore Soderberg, mixer) and Outstanding Writing (Marvin John Schwartz and Tracy Keenan Wynn, writers). It was also nominated for Directorial Achievement in Drama (Joseph Sargent) at the 23rd Primetime Emmy Awards.

At FilmInk, Erin Free wrote:

The performances in Tribes are all top-notch. In his first major leading role, Jan-Michael Vincent – ahead of his eventual major stardom throughout the 1970s in films like The Mechanic (1972), Buster and Billie (1974), White Line Fever (1975), Big Wednesday (1978) and Hooper (1978) – oozes raw-boned charisma, and wholly convinces as a peace-loving hippie with his lithe physicality. Older screen vets and well-established character actors Darren McGavin (who would hit the big time the following year with the influential hit TV movie The Night Stalker) and Earl Holliman (a busy "jobbing actor" capable of very strong work who does some of his best here) bring great shading and depth to their roles, while also selling themselves effectively as hardnosed US Marines.

Tribes was ranked the 8th best boot camp movie by Screen Junkies.
