= 1922 United States Senate election in Indiana =

- November 7, 1922
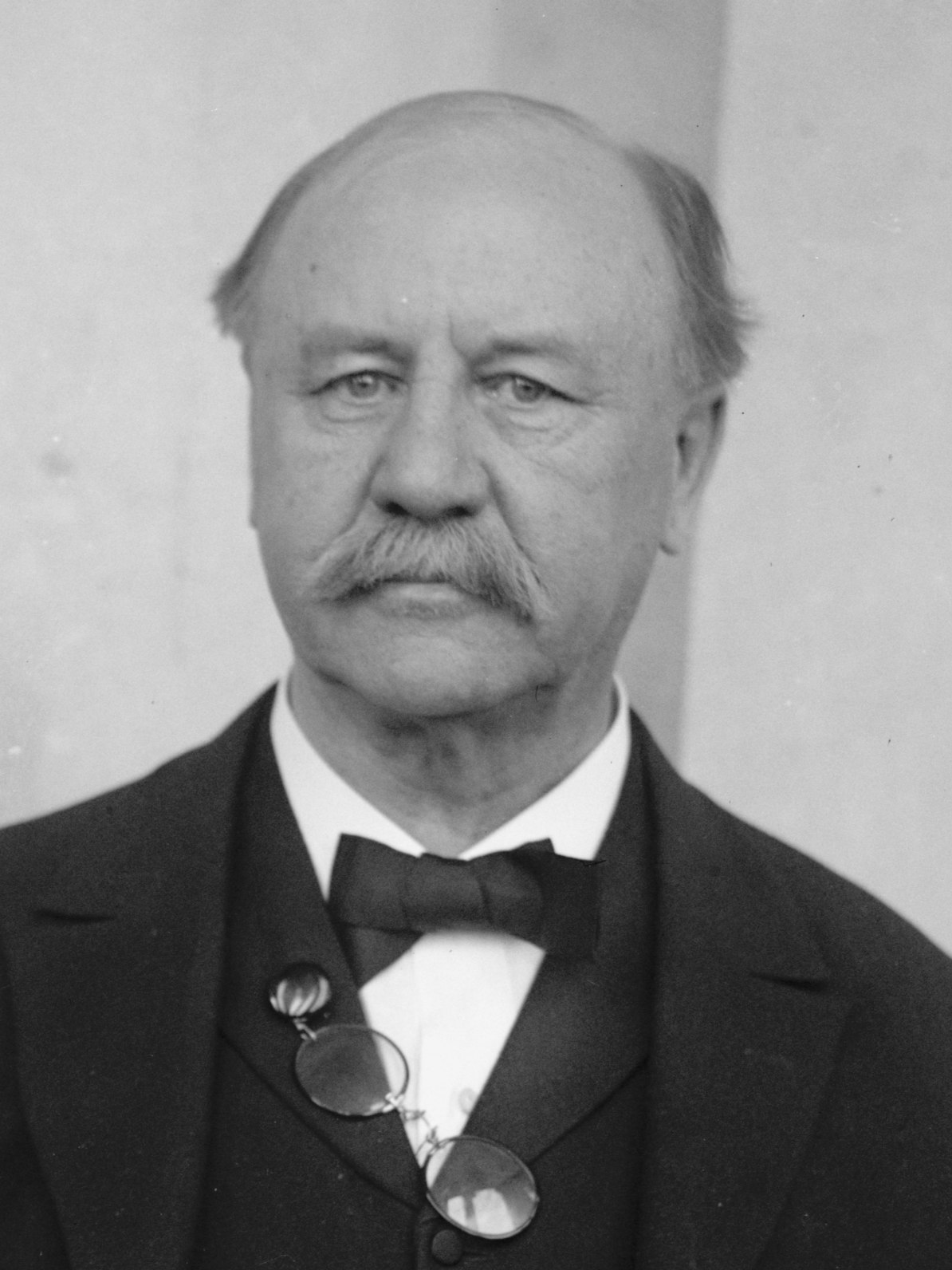

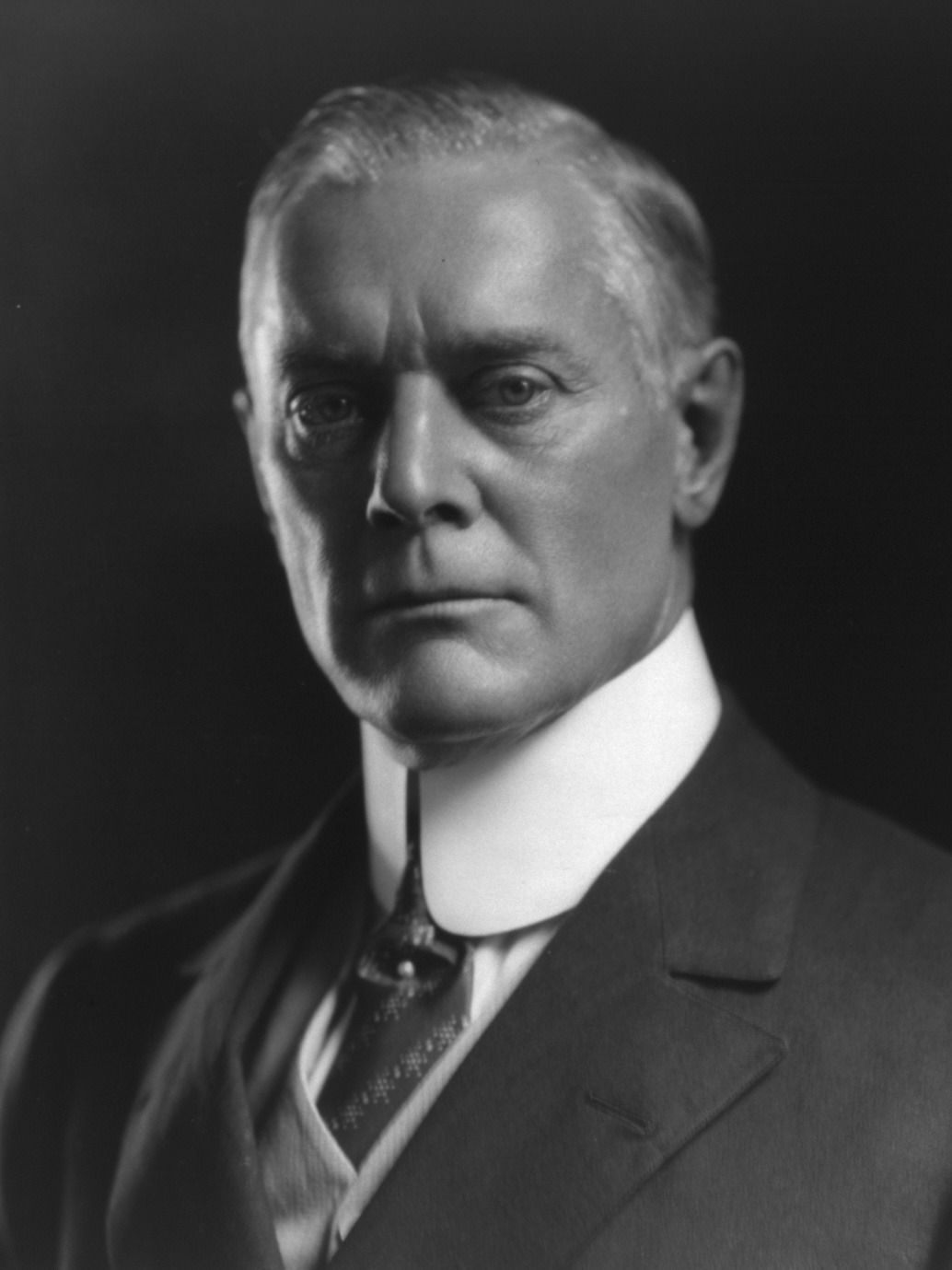
Nominee	Samuel Ralston	Albert Beveridge
Party	Democratic	Republican
Popular vote	558,169	524,558
Percentage	50.87%	47.80%
- County results Ralston: 40–50% 50–60% 60–70% Beveridge: 40–50% 50–60% 60–70%
U.S. senator before election
Harry Stewart New
Republican
Elected U.S. Senator
Samuel M. Ralston
Democratic

The 1922 United States Senate election in Indiana took place on November 7, 1922. Incumbent Republican U.S. Senator Harry Stewart New ran for re-election to a second term in office, but was defeated in the Republican primary by former Republican Senator Albert J. Beveridge who was seeking a comeback. In the general election, Beveridge was defeated by Democratic former Governor of Indiana Samuel M. Ralston. Ralston would not serve in the Senate for long and he would die in 1925.

== Republican primary ==
=== Candidates ===
- Albert Beveridge, former U.S. Senator (1899–1911)
- Harry Stewart New, incumbent Senator since 1917

=== Results ===
1922 Republican Senate primary
Party	Candidate	Votes	%
Republican	Albert J. Beveridge	206,165	52.77%
Republican	Harry Stewart New (incumbent)	184,505	47.23%
Total votes		390,670	100.00%

== Democratic primary ==
=== Candidates ===
- Charles F. Howard
- Samuel M. Ralston, former Governor of Indiana (1913–17)
- Jesse A. Sanders
- Bernard B. Shively
- Daniel W. Simms

=== Results ===
1922 Democratic Senate primary
Party	Candidate	Votes	%
Democratic	Samuel M. Ralston	174,623	65.32%
Democratic	Jesse A. Sanders	34,027	12.73%
Democratic	Daniel W. Simms	24,428	9.14%
Democratic	Bernard B. Shively	22,099	8.27%
Democratic	Charles F. Howard	12,152	4.55%
Total votes		267,329	100.00%

== General election ==
=== Results ===
1922 U.S. Senate election in Indiana
Party	Candidate	Votes	%	±%
Democratic	Samuel M. Ralston	558,169	50.87%	▲4.73
Republican	Albert J. Beveridge	524,558	47.80%	▲0.03
Socialist	William Henry	14,635	1.33%	▼1.73
Total votes		1,097,362	100.00%	
Democratic gain from Republican				

== See also ==
- 1922 United States Senate elections
