= Flap (film) =

1970 film

- Warner Archive Collection DVD cover
- Directed by: Carol Reed
- Screenplay by: Clair Huffaker
- Based on: Nobody Loves a Drunken Indian by Clair Huffaker
- Produced by: Jerry Adler (1929-1993)
- Starring: Anthony Quinn; Claude Akins; Tony Bill; Shelley Winters; Victor Jory
- Cinematography: Fred J. Koenekamp, A.S.C.
- Edited by: Frank Bracht, A.C.E.
- Music by: Marvin Hamlisch
- Production company: Cine Vesta Associates
- Distributed by: Warner Bros.
- Release date: November 19, 1970 (Albuquerque)
- Running time: 106 minutes
- Country: United States
- Language: English

Flap (distributed in Britain as The Last Warrior) is a 1970 American Western film directed by Carol Reed and starring Anthony Quinn, Claude Akins and Shelley Winters. Set in a modern Native American reservation, it is an adaptation of the novel Nobody Loves a Drunken Indian by Clair Huffaker.

== Plot ==
Flapping Eagle lives on an Indian reservation in the southwestern United States. He drinks too much, one of many sources of disagreement between Flap and his sweetheart, Dorothy Bluebell. He also has on-going trouble with Sgt. Rafferty, a police officer in the city, who is brutal and seemingly bigoted (although criticized late in the story by Flap for being, as Flap puts it, only "half Indian").

Flap supports himself by making deliveries with an old pickup and help from his buddies. Spillage of a box of "Indian dolls" intended for sale as tourist souvenirs results in a ticket from Rafferty leading to the introduction of Flap's lawyer, Wounded Bear Mr. Smith. Rather than law books, Wounded Bear's office is filled with ridiculous stacks of parchments, eventually shown to represent the many treaty promises made to the tribe. Such treaties inform Wounded Bear's counsel to Flap in the incidents that follow.

Flap stumbles into activism, first disrupting a construction crew blasting and building a highway through Indian land (Interstate 25 was being completed through the location's pueblos at that time) and accidentally destroying the crew's brand new front loader, then stealing a train after Wounded Bear leads him to believe the train would become legal Indian property once it is "abandoned" in their territory.

Rafferty is violently beaten by Flap after a series of insults and abuses and the last straw, the shooting of a dog belonging to a poor, pitifully lonely, old Indian. Now a fugitive-cum-Indian activist whose protests have gained him publicity and popularity, again under counsel of a treaty that in this case suggests that unwarranted police action against him has reverted the city back to the tribe, Flap leads a march into the city to establish their claim. From a hospital window, Rafferty aims a handgun and assassinates him.

== Cast ==
- Anthony Quinn as Flapping Eagle
- Claude Akins as Lobo
- Tony Bill as Eleven Snowflake
- Shelley Winters as Dorothy Bluebell
- Victor Jory as Wounded Bear Mr. Smith
- Don Collier as Mike Lyons
- Victor French as Rafferty
- Rodolfo Acosta as Storekeep
- Susana Miranda as Ann Looking Deer
- Anthony Caruso as Silver Dollar
- William Mims as Steve Gray
- Rudy Diaz as Larry Standing Elk
- Pedro Regas as She'll-Be-Back-Pretty-Soon
- John War Eagle as Luke Wolf
- J. Edward McKinley as Harris
- Robert Cleaves as Gus Kirk

== Production ==
Intending to avoid cinema stereotypes of Native Americans, producer Jerry Adler hired Sir Carol Reed because the British director had not had exposure to the clichéd portrayal of American Indians in American Westerns.

Richard Harris (A Man Called Horse, 1970) was originally cast as Flapping Eagle, but withdrew from the production over creative differences, and was replaced by Anthony Quinn. Himself part Mexican-Indian, "Hollywood's favorite Indian warrior", Quinn had made several stereotypical Old West American Indian portrayals, including Crazy Horse in They Died with Their Boots On, a Cheyenne Indian in The Plainsman, and a fictional portrayal of Chief Yellow Hand in Buffalo Bill.

The role of Flapping Eagle was directed with American patriotic elements to communicate that the character did not hold total animosity towards the United States and was in fact a dutiful citizen; the character had been a decorated sergeant in the United States Army and wore a hat and shirt for the New York Yankees as well as a sea jacket (author Clair Huffaker was a US Navy veteran of WWII). The portrayal of Flapping Eagle as a heavy drinking veteran hero of WWII invited comparison to Ira Hayes. When wearing his full U.S. Army dress uniform in the final scenes, Flap also wore a coup feather, such as was awarded to some tribal members upon return from wartime service in the U.S. Military.

The movie was filmed in 1969 on locations in Albuquerque, Madrid, Puye Cliffs (Santa Clara Pueblo), Santa Fe, and Santo Domingo Pueblo.

After completion, concerned about reception, Warner Bros. kept the movie on the shelf for 18 months before general release. The November following production, 89 American Indians and their supporters occupied Alcatraz Island. Quinn was among the several celebrities who visited the Occupation. After this, the movie was promoted in connection and the Occupation, with posters proclaiming "The Indians have already claimed Alcatraz."

The film production drew protests, given the original title was Nobody Loves a Drunken Indian, particularly from local Indians when the production was on location in and near pueblo reservations. The name was changed to Nobody Loves Flapping Eagle before later being shortened after filming to Flap.

== Release ==
The movie was given a special premiere on November 19, 1970, in the Cinema East Theater of Albuquerque with Anthony Quinn making a personal appearance. Admission was $100 per seat with all proceeds establishing a $75,000 creative arts scholarship fund for Native American students.

== Reception ==
Reception of the film varied; on one hand the film was praised for illuminating the plight of Indians in America, while Anthony Quinn's bumbling caricature (including a few of his signature dance steps from Zorba the Greek) drew criticism, inviting comparisons to his previous ethnic characters, e.g., a "Zorba the Navajo". A group of Native Americans who were surveyed about the film in the Democrat and Chronicle newspaper of Rochester, New York said that "this picture made a joke of Indian rights. We don't mind a laugh at ourselves but this picture made us look like idiots."

Stanley Kauffmann of The New Republic wrote 'Flap is a corny, ill-made picture full of tedious movie brawls'.

== Music ==
The song "If Nobody Loves" was written by Marvin Hamlisch with lyrics by Estelle Levitt. It is performed by Kenny Rogers & The First Edition.

== See also ==
- List of American films of 1970

== Bibliography ==
- Evans, Peter William. Carol Reed. Manchester University Press, 2005.
