= Clair Huffaker =

American writer

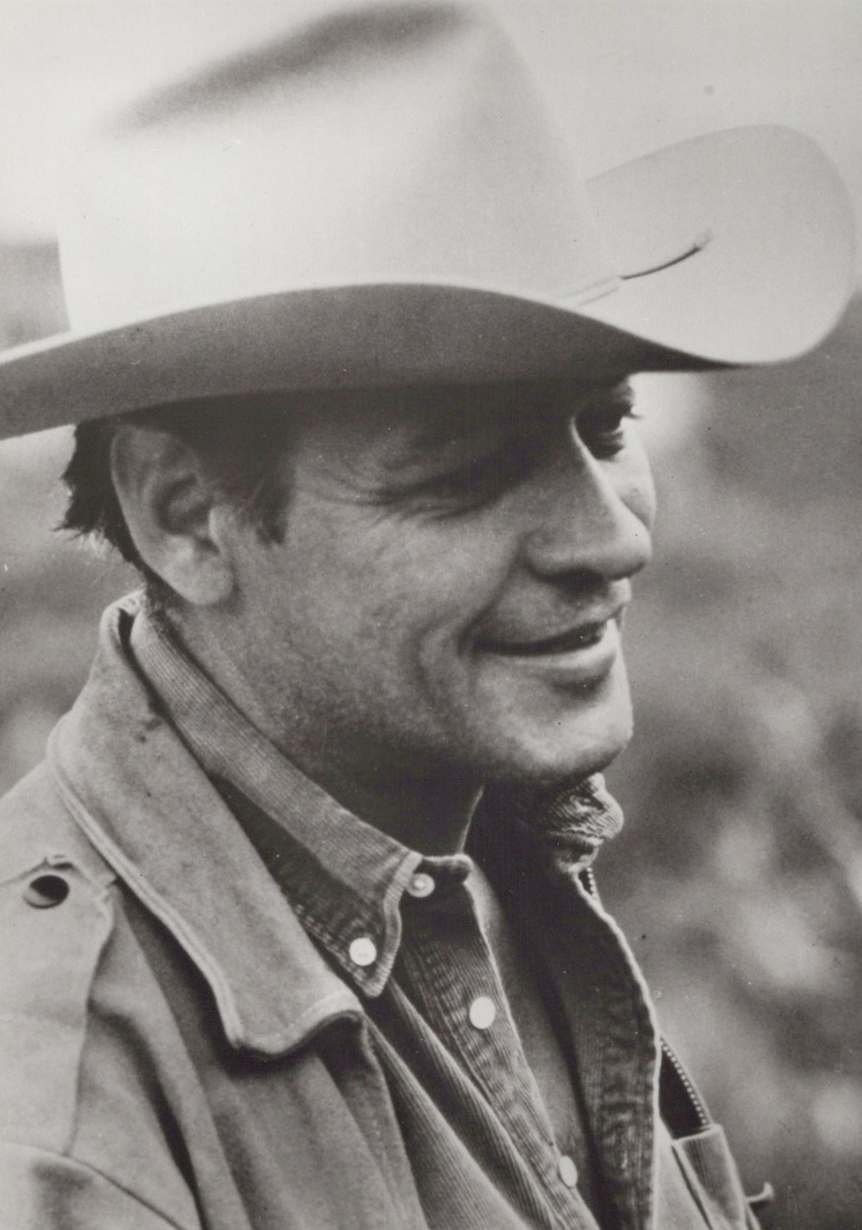
- Huffaker in 1973
- Born: September 26, 1926; Magna, Utah, U.S.
- Died: April 3, 1990 (aged 63); Los Angeles, California, U.S.
- Occupations: Screenwriter, author

Clair Huffaker (September 26, 1926 – April 3, 1990) was an American screenwriter and author of westerns and other fiction, many of which were turned into films.

== Biography ==
Born in Magna, Utah, Huffaker wrote of his childhood in One Time I Saw Morning Come Home. He attended Princeton and Columbia universities and the Sorbonne in Paris. He served in the United States Navy in World War II and then studied in Europe before returning to America. After the war, he worked in Chicago as an assistant editor for Time before turning to fiction.

== Novels ==
- Badge for a Gunfighter (January 1, 1957)
- Badman (filmed as The War Wagon) (April 1, 1957)
- Rider from Thunder Mountain (November 1, 1957)
- Cowboy (1958) Novelization of the screenplay
- Flaming Lance (filmed as Flaming Star) (1958)
- Posse from Hell (1958)
- Guns of Rio Conchos (1958)
- Seven Ways from Sundown (1959)
- Good Lord, You're Upside Down! (1963)
- Nobody Loves a Drunken Indian (filmed as Flap (1967)
- The Cowboy and the Cossack (1973)
- One Time I Saw Morning Come Home (1974)
- Clair Huffaker's Profiles of the American West (1976)

== Screenplays ==
- Seven Ways from Sundown (1960)
- Flaming Star (1960)
- Posse from Hell (1961)
- The Comancheros (1961)
- The Second Time Around (1961) as Cecil Dan Hansen
- Rio Conchos (1964)
- Tarzan and the Valley of Gold (1966)
- The War Wagon (1967)
- Hellfighters (1968)
- 100 Rifles (1969)
- Flap (1970)
- The Deserter (1971) from a story by himself
- Chino (1973) with others

Clair Huffaker also wrote scripts for television and was one of the writers on the Warner Brothers Western series Lawman
