= The War Wagon =

1967 film directed by Burt Kennedy

- Theatrical poster by Howard Terpning
- Directed by: Burt Kennedy
- Written by: Clair Huffaker
- Based on: Badman (novel) by Clair Huffaker
- Produced by: Marvin Schwartz
- Starring: John Wayne; Kirk Douglas; Howard Keel; Robert Walker; Keenan Wynn; Bruce Cabot; Joanna Barnes
- Cinematography: William H. Clothier
- Edited by: Harry W. Gerstad
- Music by: Dimitri Tiomkin
- Production companies: Batjac Productions; Marvin Schwarz Productions
- Distributed by: Universal Pictures
- Release date: May 27, 1967
- Running time: 101 minutes
- Country: United States
- Language: English
- Box office: $9,528,000

The War Wagon is a 1967 American Western heist film directed by Burt Kennedy and starring John Wayne and Kirk Douglas. Released by Universal Pictures, it was produced by Marvin Schwartz and adapted by Clair Huffaker from his own novel. The supporting cast includes Howard Keel, Robert Walker Jr., Keenan Wynn, Bruce Cabot, Joanna Barnes, Valora Noland, Bruce Dern, and Gene Evans. The film received generally positive reviews.

Filming took place in Sierra de Órganos National Park in the town of Sombrerete, Mexico. Kennedy called it "a big success."

== Plot ==
Former rancher Taw Jackson returns to his hometown to settle a score with corrupt businessman Frank Pierce; three years earlier, Pierce had Jackson wrongfully imprisoned and appropriated his land, including his house and some recently discovered gold deposits. Jackson plans to steal an upcoming $500,000 (Note: Approximately $12-13 million today.) shipment of gold dust from Pierce's "war wagon", an armored stagecoach surrounded by mounted guards. Wes Fletcher, an elderly wagon driver employed by Pierce to transport dry goods, becomes Jackson's informant. The third member Jackson recruits for his team is Lomax, a gunslinger and safecracker, who earlier shot Jackson as part of Pierce's plot.

The fourth team member is Levi Walking Bear, a Kiowa translator, whom Jackson and Lomax rescue from a gang of Mexican bandits. Jackson then sends Lomax to pick up the final member, Billy Hyatt, a teenage drunkard and explosives expert. When the team first meets to discuss their plan, Fletcher brings his teenage "wife" Kate along, and flies into a jealous rage when Hyatt gives her some coffee.

Jackson and Levi negotiate with the Kiowas; because Pierce is deliberately starving the tribe off of their land, they agree to help. Meanwhile, Lomax rides into town and is approached in a saloon by Pierce, who offers him $12,000 to kill Jackson. An inebriated Hyatt enters, and comes dangerously close to revealing the plan. Lomax knocks him unconscious and hands him over to the Sheriff for the night, then accepts Pierce's offer, but asks for time to do the job.

In the morning, Jackson sends Hyatt to Fletcher's farm. Hyatt finds Kate alone, and she reveals that her impoverished parents had traded her to Fletcher. Fletcher returns and threatens Hyatt with a knife, but Jackson arrives in time to defuse the situation. Hyatt says he wants to use nitroglycerin for his part of the heist, so he, Jackson, and Lomax sneak onto Jackson's old ranch to steal some from Pierce. Jackson keeps Pierce distracted by pretending to collect some of his old things, while Lomax and Hyatt crack a safe and take the explosives.

The next day, Hyatt rigs a bridge with bottles of nitro, Levi blocks the war wagon's route with a felled tree, Lomax and Jackson set up a booby trap in a narrow gorge, and Pierce and his guards set out with the gold in the war wagon. Kiowa warriors create a distraction that briefly draws off the wagon's guards, causing them to be stranded on the other side of a canyon when the bridge explodes behind the wagon. Some more Kiowa warriors attack the wagon to get the gold for themselves, but a newly installed Gatling gun forces them to retreat.

The fallen tree diverts the wagon into the gorge, and Jackson and Lomax spring their trap, killing the drivers. Pierce shoots the last two of his men when they try to desert him, but the second shoots back as he dies, killing Pierce. The wagon crashes into a gulch, and Jackson's team hides the gold dust in some barrels of flour on Fletcher's cart. The Kiowa warriors arrive to take the gold, and Fletcher is killed when he attempts to stop them. Hyatt manages to use the last bottle of nitro to kill the leader Chief Wild Horse and scare the remaining warriors away. The explosion spooks the cart horses; as they flee, the flour barrels fall off the cart and break open next to a group of evacuating Kiowa women and children. Unaware that there is gold mixed in, they gather up the flour to feed themselves.

Jackson reaches the cart first. In a hidden compartment, he finds $100,000 worth of gold that Fletcher intended to steal from his partners. Thinking they have lost everything, Levi returns to the Kiowas, and Lomax angrily takes Jackson's horse as payment. When Hyatt arrives with Kate, Jackson gives them a small amount of the dust, hiding the rest. When a furious Lomax confronts him, Jackson smugly tells Lomax that he has to be kept alive until the group meets in six months, as planned, to divide up the loot.

== Cast ==
- John Wayne as Taw Jackson
- Kirk Douglas as Lomax
- Howard Keel as Levi Walking Bear
- Robert Walker Jr. as Billy Hyatt
- Keenan Wynn as Wes Fletcher
- Bruce Cabot as Frank Pierce
- Joanna Barnes as Lola
- Valora Noland as Kate Fletcher
- Bruce Dern as Hammond
- Gene Evans as Deputy Hoag
- Terry Wilson as Sheriff Strike
- Don Collier as Shack
- Sheb Wooley as Snyder
- Ann McCrea as Felicia
- Emilio Fernández as Calita
- Frank McGrath as Bartender
- Chuck Roberson as Brown
- Red Morgan as Early
- Hal Needham as Hite
- Marco Antonio Ribeiro as Chief Wild Horse
- Perla Walter as Rosita

== Production ==
The film was based on the 1957 novel Badman by Clair Huffaker. In September 1962, Huffaker announced he would adapt Badman into a script at Producers Studio for his own Lucifer Productions (they were also going to make Guns of Rio Conchos, The Day Before Tomorrow, and Ship on Highway 7), but the project eventually went to Universal. Huffaker said that, while he had written the novel in ten days, he spent three months writing the screenplay. Because Badman was the eleventh book that Huffaker had sold to a film studio, Trident Publishing put him under contract to write a book a year for five years.

In June 1966, John Wayne announced he had signed a two-picture deal with Universal, the movies being The War Wagon and The Green Berets. This film would be a co-production between Wayne's company, Batjac, and producer Marvin Schwartz. The following month, it was announced that Kirk Douglas would play the co-starring role of Lomax in the film and Burt Kennedy would direct. The extensive second-unit stunt work for the film was supervised by Cliff Lyons.

Filming took place in Durango, Mexico, and at Churubusco Studios in Mexico City, starting on September 19, 1966, and lasting 12 weeks. About the shoot, Wayne said: "We're gaining a day every week. This combined Hollywood and Mexican crew is great. If we can come home a week under schedule, we'll all be home with our families for turkey dinner." Despite pressure to finish shooting ahead of schedule, Douglas was late to the set one day, because he was shooting an endorsement for California Governor Pat Brown, a Democrat. John Wayne was late to work the next day, because he was shooting a commercial for the Republican candidate Ronald Reagan. Huffaker was present on set for the first and last three weeks of production and, while there, made a number of changes to the script. Kennedy said he let Wayne direct himself in the film.

Dimitri Tiomkin composed the score, one of four film score collaborations with John Wayne. Tiomkin also composed the theme song, “The Ballad of the War Wagon”, sung by Ed Ames with lyrics written by Ned Washington.

== Reception ==
=== Box office ===
The film debuted in first place at the domestic box office. It grossed $9,563,000 in total, making it a success (one account called it a "smash success").

=== Critical response ===
The War Wagon was met with generally positive reviews from critics and holds an 83% "Fresh" score on Rotten Tomatoes, based on 12 reviews. Roger Ebert gave the film three out of four stars, calling it "that comparative rarity, a Western filmed with quiet good humor. It is also a point of departure for John Wayne, who plays a bad guy for just about the first time in his career."

== Comic book adaptation ==
- Dell Movie Classic: The War Wagon (September 1967)

== See also ==
- List of American films of 1967
- John Wayne filmography
