= John Gabriel (actor) =

American actor (1931–2021)

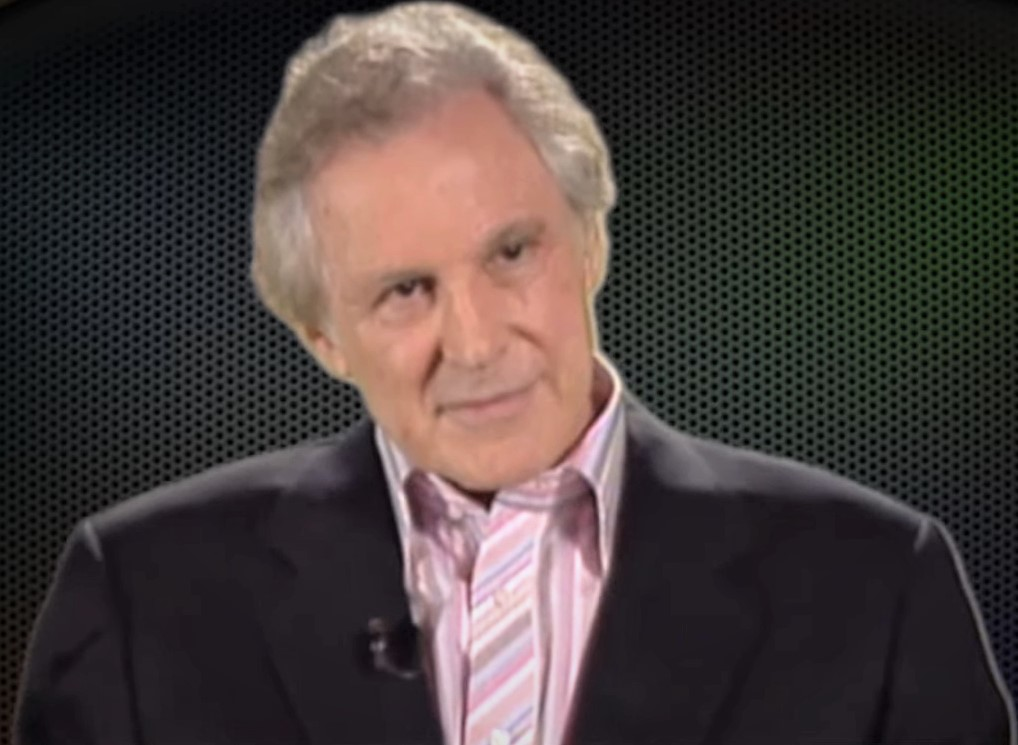
- Gabriel in 2009
- Born: Jack Monkarsh; May 25, 1931; Niagara Falls, New York, U.S.
- Died: June 11, 2021 (aged 90)
- Occupations: Actor, singer-lyricist, producer
- Years active: 1953–2021
- Spouse: Sandra Gabriel
- Children: 2
- Website: http://www.johngabriel.net/ at the Wayback Machine (archived February 4, 2019)

John Gabriel (born Jack Monkarsh; May 25, 1931 – June 11, 2021) was an American actor, singer-lyricist, and producer who is best known for his role as Seneca Beaulac on Ryan's Hope (1975–1985, 1988–1989), for which he received an Emmy Award nomination in 1980. Gabriel, who played the Professor in the original, unaired Gilligan's Island pilot, was the father of actress Andrea Gabriel. He appeared on Broadway in The Happy Time in 1968, and produced the eponymous television series Charles Grodin starring Charles Grodin in 1995.

== Family ==
Gabriel was born in Niagara Falls, New York, the youngest of three children of Harry and Rae Monkarsh. His parents were of Polish Jewish/Russian Jewish descent. His father was born in then-Mandatory Palestine.

== Career ==
Gabriel, throughout his career as an actor and singer, worked steadily in a wide variety of capacities. He appeared on stage in two Broadway productions, The Happy Time and the musical Applause, as well as off-Broadway in Fighting International Fat at the Playwrights Horizons. Gabriel played numerous character roles in film and television over a period of five decades.

He portrayed Pedro in the John Wayne movie El Dorado and also composed its title song in collaboration with Nelson Riddle.

He starred in Days of Our Lives, General Hospital, and Ryan's Hope.

From 1973 to 1975, he had a recurring role as WJM-TV sportscaster Andy Rivers on The Mary Tyler Moore Show.

As a singer, Gabriel appeared on numerous television shows, including The Ed Sullivan Show, The Merv Griffin Show, The Mike Douglas Show, and Regis and Kathy Lee, among others. He produced the Charles Grodin Show for six years.

== Words and Music ==
In 2004, Gabriel wrote and produced, along with his actress wife Sandy Gabriel, best known for her role of Edna Thornton on All My Children, a nightclub act which he regularly toured across the United States. The show, titled Words And Music, was a celebration of classic American song interspersed with stories culled from Gabriel's vast experience in show business. In 2010, the production was videotaped in Los Angeles.

== Death ==
John Gabriel died in New York on June 11, 2021, at age 90. His daughter attributed his death to complications from Alzheimer’s disease.

== Selected filmography ==
Year	Film	Role	Notes
1990	The Return of Superfly	Sergeant Joyner	
1980	It's My Turn	Hunter	
1980	Just Tell Me What You Want	Commentator	Film directed by Sidney Lumet
1976	Network	TV Anchor (reporting Beale's suicide threat)	Uncredited
1975	The Hiding Place	Professor Zeiner	
1970	Hell's Bloody Devils	Mark Adams	Also known as The Fakers; wrote lyrics for film's theme song, "The Fakers", in collaboration with composer Nelson Riddle
1966	Stagecoach	Captain Jim Mallory	
1966	El Dorado	Pedro	Wrote lyrics for film's theme song, "El Dorado", in collaboration with composer Nelson Riddle
1965	Red Line 7000	Jake	Film directed by Howard Hawks; Uncredited
1964	Sex and the College Girl	Larry Devon	
1960	The Story of Ruth	Chilion	
1958	South Pacific	Radio Officer	
1958	The Young Lions	Burn	
1958	The Hunters	Lieutenant Corona	Also wrote and composed the film's theme song, "The Hunter"; performed the song live on The Ed Sullivan Show in 1959

== Selected television appearances ==
Year	Film	Role	Notes
2002	Days of Our Lives	Pete LeGrand	Recurring
1999	Law & Order	Bernard Kincaide	Episode: "Admissions"
1993	Seinfeld	Newscaster	Episode: "The Non-Fat Yogurt"
1993	Murder, She Wrote	Dr. Johnny Windurst	Episode: "The Petrified Forest"
1989	Generations	Vic Reynolds	Recurring
1975–1985, 1988-1989	Ryan's Hope	Seneca Beaulac	726 Episodes
1988	The Incredible Hulk Returns	Joshua Lambert	Television film
1987	Kate & Allie	Peter Rutland	Recurring
1982	Hart To Hart	Justin	Recurring
1973–1975	The Mary Tyler Moore Show	Andy Rivers	Episodes: "The System", "A Son For Murray", "Ted Baxter Meets Walter Cronkite", "Lou's First Date", "Hi There, Sports Fans"
1974	Here's Lucy	Jack Thomas	Episode: "Mary Jane's Boyfriend"
1972–1973	General Hospital	Teddy Holmes	Recurring
1970–1972	Love of Life	Linc Morrison	Recurring
1964	Gilligan's Island	Professor	Pilot Episode: "Marooned". John Gabriel portrayed a high school teacher; the part was re-cast for the series
1961–1963	77 Sunset Strip	Various roles	Episodes: "Deposit With Caution", "The Parallel Caper", "Strange Bedfellows"
1963	The Untouchables	Dr. Daniel Gifford	Episodes: "Jake Dance", "Bird In The Hand"
1962	Bachelor Father	Dr. Hart Bellamy	Episode: "Peter, the Medicine Man"
1962	Dick Powell Theater	Lieutenant Buka	Recurring
1961	Hawaiian Eye	Derek Demaarest, Buddy Keene	Episodes: "The Pretty People", "The Kiddi Kid"
1959	General Electric Theater : Absalom My Son	John	Co-Starred with Burl Ives
1958	Men of Annapolis	Layden	Episode: "The Runaway"
1958	The New Adventures of Charlie Chan	The Actor	Episode: "The Hand of Hera Dass"
1953	You Are There	Major John Andre	Episode: "The Treason of Benedict Arnold"
