= Valora Noland =

American actress (1941-2022)

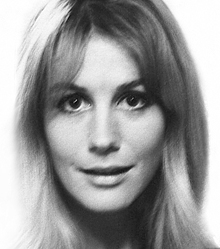
- Noland in 1967
- Born: Valor Baum; December 8, 1941; Seattle, Washington, U.S.
- Died: March 27, 2022 (aged 80); Sebastopol, California, U.S.
- Other name: Valora Tree
- Occupations: Actress; author; photographer
- Years active: 1961–1970 (acting)
- Known for: "Patterns of Force" (Star Trek); Beach Party
- Relatives: Albert J. Beveridge (grandfather)

Valora Noland (born Valor Baum; December 8, 1941 – March 27, 2022) was an American actress, notable for her 1960s movie and television work, and in her later years, was a photographer and author.

== Early life and education ==
Noland was born in Seattle. Her mother was Abigail Beveridge and her father was German Expressionist artist Franz Maximiian Baum who taught Beveridge at the Academy of Fine Arts, Munich. They married in Germany in 1934 but left in 1939 for the US, fleeing Nazi rule. Noland's family moved from Seattle to the countryside near Santa Cruz, California in 1943. Her mother named her "Valor", inspired by a speech by Winston Churchill. As a youth, Noland became a proficient equestrian, and she trained and owned horses her entire life. Sometime around 1959 she decided to become an actress. She graduated from Santa Cruz High School in 1959. She was accepted by the Pasadena Playhouse and, while studying there for a year and a half, settled on "Valora Noland" for her stage name. After a talent scout introduced her to her first agent, she moved to Hollywood.

Noland's grandfather, Albert J. Beveridge was a United States Senator from Indiana.

== Career ==
Noland's first job was an improvised scene with three other actors for the film Five Finger Exercise, later cut before distribution. Still, it enabled her to buy her SAG card, and somewhat larger parts in TV shows followed. She had a small role in a 1961 episode of the TV western The Rifleman entitled "High Country".

She played Vinnie in The Donna Reed Show episode entitled "Everywhere That Mary Goes." Her first movie role was in Beach Party (1963), and the next year she played a part in an independent production, Summer Children, made on Catalina Island. Although the film was not initially released due to distribution issues, it was digitally restored in 2010 and premiered at the Slamdance Film Festival in January 2011, followed by limited special screenings and home release. This was followed by Muscle Beach Party and after that a film titled Sex and the College Girl, which took place on Puerto Rico. A third "island" film came in 1965 when she was chosen to play the unfaithful wife in The Passionate Strangers, a Philippine production.

Back in Hollywood, Noland joined the cast of The War Wagon for a minimal role and appeared in guest roles in television shows including The Man from U.N.C.L.E., The Virginian, Star Trek, and Mannix as Cindy Gier in "Live Blueberries". Season 1 episode 7.

Noland also was active as a photographer and, as Valora Tree, authored the books Horse Stories, and Water Lily Ponds, a volume of poetry. In addition, she hosted classical and jazz music programs on two nonprofit radio stations during the 1980's.

== Death ==
Noland died on March 27, 2022, at the age of 80 in Sebastopol, California.

== Select appearances and authorship ==
=== Television ===
- Clare in The Rifleman episode, "The High Country" (1961)
- Alma Moore in Laramie episode, "Double Eagles" (1962)
- Vinnie Sayres in The Donna Reed Show episode, "Everywhere That Mary Goes" (1963)
- Vickie in Burke's Law episode, "Who Killed Billy Jo" (1963)
- Miss Andrews in Dr. Kildare episode, "A Hand Held Out in Darkness" (1963)
- Millie in The DuPont Show of the Week episode, "Two Faces of Treason" (1963)
- Wendy in The Donna Reed Show episode, "The Unheroic Hero" (1965)
- Bit Girl #2 in Burke's Law episode, "Who Killed Hamlet?" (1965)
- Duchess Vicky in The Man from U.N.C.L.E. episode, "The Round Table Affair" (1966)
- Amanda Harley in The Virginian episode, "Girl on the Pinto" (1967)
- Cindy Gier in Mannix episode, "Live Blueberries" (1967)
- Daras in Star Trek episode, "Patterns of Force" (1968)

=== Filmography ===
- Beach Party (1963) - Rhonda
- Muscle Beach Party (1964) - Animal aka Rhonda
- Sex and the College Girl (1964) - Vickie
- Summer Children (1965) - Diana
- The Passionate Strangers (1966) - Margaret Courtney
- The War Wagon (1967) - Kate

=== Publications ===
- Tree, Valora (2014). Horse Stories. CreateSpace Independent Publishing. ISBN 978-1497521810.
- Tree, Valora (2018). Water Lily Ponds. Neology Publishing. ISBN 978-0615356600.
