= Albert J. Beveridge =

American historian and politician (1862–1927)

Albert Beveridge
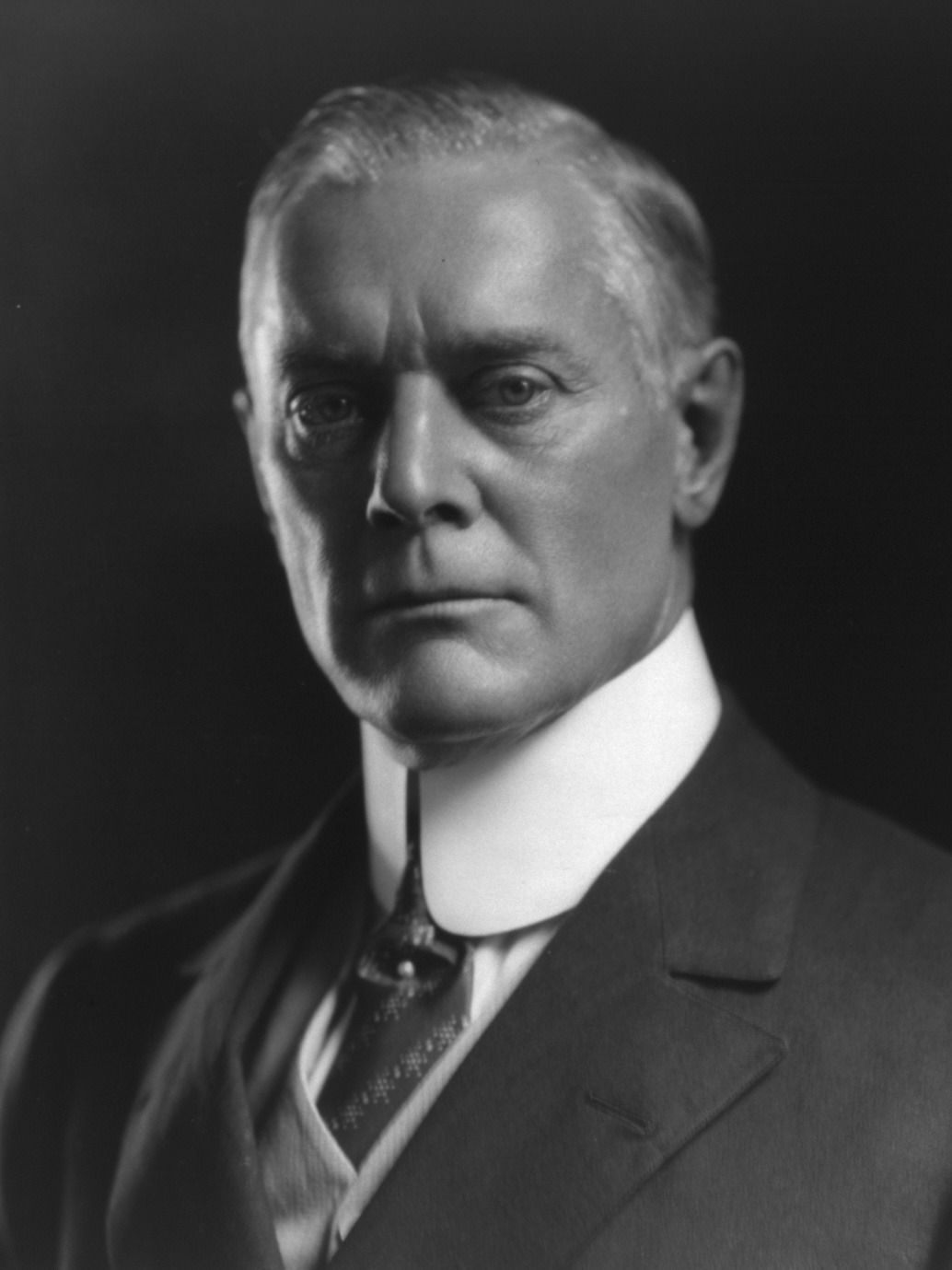
- Beveridge, 1922

United States Senator from Indiana
- In office March 4, 1899 – March 3, 1911
- Preceded by: David Turpie
- Succeeded by: John W. Kern

Personal details
- Born: Albert Jeremiah Beveridge; October 6, 1862 Highland County, Ohio, U.S.
- Died: April 27, 1927 (aged 64) Indianapolis, Indiana, U.S.
- Resting place: Crown Hill Cemetery and Arboretum, Section 45, Lot 22; 39.8199674°N 86.1705874°W
- Party: Republican (before 1912, 1920–1927); Progressive (1912–1920)
- Spouses: Katherine Langsdale (m. 1887; died 1900) Catherine Eddy (m. 1907)
- Children: 2
- Relatives: Valora Noland (granddaughter)
- Education: Indiana Asbury University (PhB)
- Awards: Pulitzer Prize (1920)
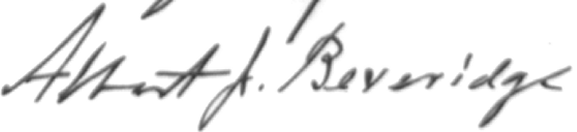
- Signature

Albert Jeremiah Beveridge (October 6, 1862 – April 27, 1927) was an American historian and United States senator from Indiana. He was an intellectual leader of the Progressive Era and a biographer of Chief Justice John Marshall and President Abraham Lincoln.

== Early and personal life, education, and employment ==
Beveridge was born in Highland County, Ohio, near Sugar Tree Ridge; his parents moved to Indiana soon after his birth. Both of his parents, Thomas H. and Frances Parkinson, were of English descent. His childhood was one of hard work and labor. Beveridge graduated from Sullivan Township High School in 1881. Securing an education with difficulty, he eventually became a law clerk in Indianapolis. Beveridge graduated from Indiana Asbury University (now DePauw University) in 1885, with a Ph.B. degree. He was a member of Delta Kappa Epsilon fraternity. He was known as a compelling orator, delivering speeches supporting territorial expansion by the US and increasing the power of the federal government.

In 1887, he was admitted to the Indiana bar, practiced law in Indianapolis, and married Katherine Langsdale. After Langsdale's death in 1900, Beveridge married Catherine Eddy in 1907. They had two children.

Beveridge was a Freemason and a member of Oriental Lodge No. 500 in Indianapolis.

== Political career ==
Beveridge entered politics in 1884 by speaking on behalf of presidential candidate James G. Blaine and was prominent in later campaigns, particularly in 1896, when his speeches attracted general attention. In 1899, Beveridge was appointed to the U.S. Senate as a Republican and served until 1911. He supported Theodore Roosevelt's progressive views and was the keynote speaker at the new Progressive Party convention which nominated Roosevelt for U.S. President in 1912.

Beveridge is known as one of the most prominent American imperialists. He supported the annexation of the Philippines and, along with Republican leader Henry Cabot Lodge, campaigned for the construction of a new navy. In 1901, Beveridge became chair of the Senate Committee on Territories, which allowed him to support statehood for Oklahoma. However, he blocked statehood for New Mexico and Arizona because he deemed the territories too sparsely occupied by white people. In his opinion, they contained too many Hispanics and Native Americans, whom he described as intellectually incapable of understanding the concept of self-governance. He celebrated the "white man's burden" as a noble mission, part of God's plan to bring civilization to the entire world: "It is racial.... He has marked the American people as His chosen nation...."

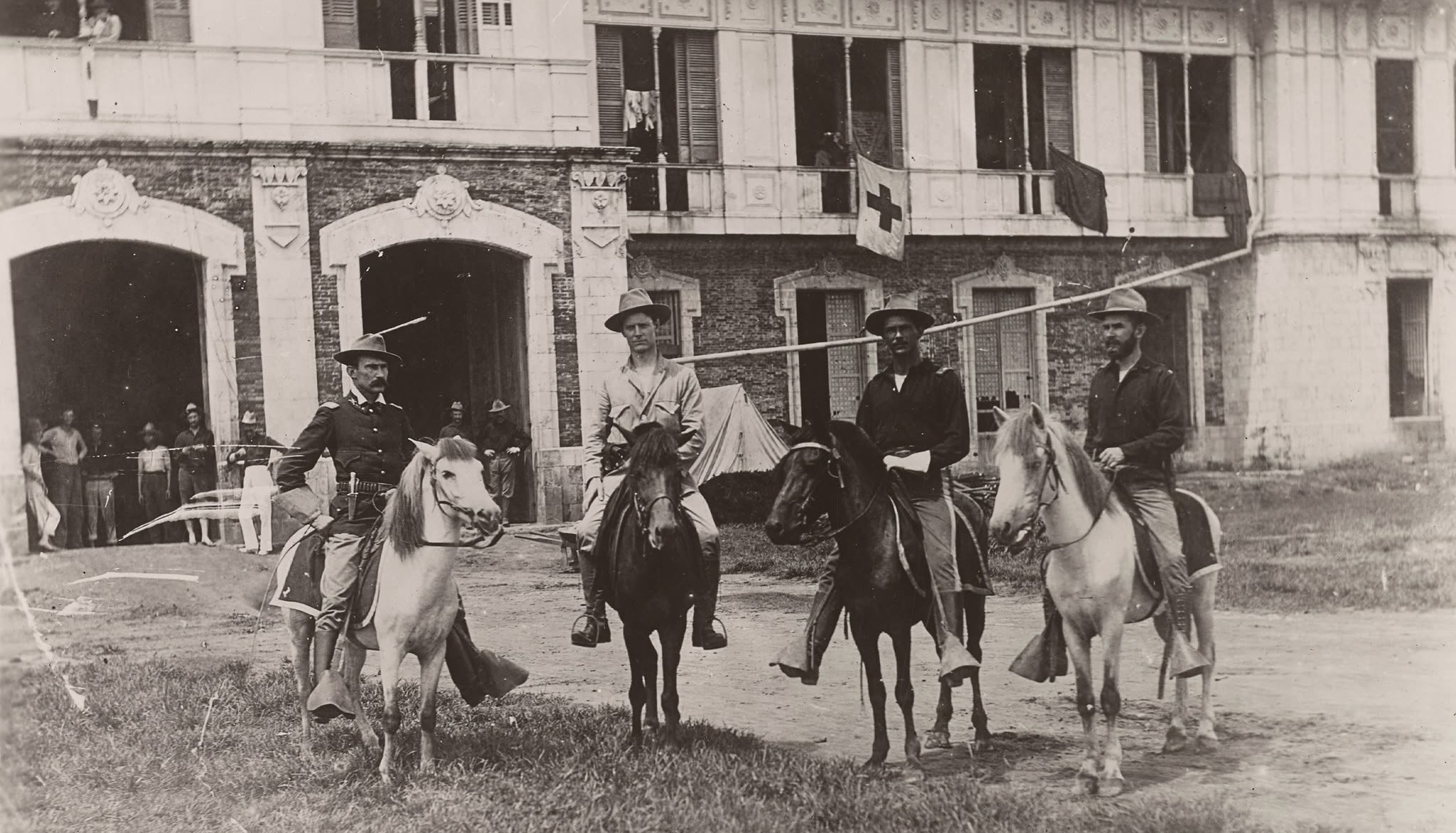
Beveridge on horseback (second from the left) with Colonel Francis Gracey Childers (far left) at the University of San Agustin in Iloilo City, 1899.

After Beveridge's election in 1905 to a second term, he became identified with the reform-minded faction of the Republican Party. He championed national child labor legislation, broke with President William Howard Taft over the Payne–Aldrich Tariff, and sponsored the Federal Meat Inspection Act of 1906, adopted in the wake of the publication of Upton Sinclair's The Jungle. Furthermore, Beveridge joined insurgents in supporting postal savings bank legislation and railroad regulations with the Mann–Elkins Act of 1910.

During the 1908 Republican Convention, the vice-presidential nomination was urged upon Beveridge by Frank Hitchcock as manager of Taft's campaign, by Senator Reed Smoot of Utah, and by the Nebraska delegation, but Beveridge refused.

He lost his Senate seat to John Worth Kern when the Democrats took Indiana in the 1910 elections. In 1912, when Roosevelt left the Republican Party to found the short-lived Progressive Party, Beveridge left with him and ran campaigns as that party's Indiana nominee in the 1912 race for governor and the 1914 race for senator, losing both. When the Progressive Party disintegrated, Beveridge returned to the Republicans with his political future in tatters; he eventually ran one more race for the Senate in 1922, winning the primary against incumbent Harry S. New but losing the general to Samuel M. Ralston. Beveridge would never again hold office. Another contribution towards his political downfall was the fact he was a great critic of Woodrow Wilson. He encouraged Wilson to take a more interventionist policy with the Mexican Revolution but disliked Wilson's League of Nations, which Beveridge felt would undermine American independence.

In the twilight of his life, Beveridge came to repudiate some of the earlier expansion of governmental power that he had championed in his earlier career. In one notable address, delivered before the Sons of the Revolution's annual dinner in June 1923, Beveridge decried the growth of the regulatory state and the proliferation of regulatory bodies, bureaus and commissions. "America would be better off as a country and Americans happier and more prosperous as a people," he suggested, "if half of our Government boards, bureaus and commissions were abolished, hundreds of thousands of our Government officials, agents and employees were discharged and two-thirds of our Government regulations, restrictions and inhibitions were removed."

== Historian ==
As his political career drew to a close, Beveridge dedicated his time to writing scholarly biographies. He was a member and secretary of the American Historical Association (AHA). His four-volume biography of John Marshall, The Life of John Marshall, published in 1916–1919, won Beveridge a Pulitzer Prize for Biography or Autobiography and connected events in John Marshall's life with his later rulings on the U.S. Supreme Court.

Beveridge spent most of his final years writing a four-volume biography of Abraham Lincoln, only half-finished at his death, posthumously published in 1928 as Abraham Lincoln, 1809–1858 (2 vols.). It stripped away the myths and revealed a complex and imperfect politician. In 1939, the AHA established the Beveridge Award in his memory through a gift from his widow and from donations from members.

== Tolstoy film ==
In 1901, a decade before Leo Tolstoy died, American travel lecturer Burton Holmes visited Yasnaya Polyana with Beveridge. As the three men conversed, Holmes filmed Tolstoy with his 60-mm camera. Afterwards, Beveridge's advisers succeeded in having the film destroyed, fearing that evidence of his having met with a radical Russian author might hurt his chances of running for the presidency.

== Death ==
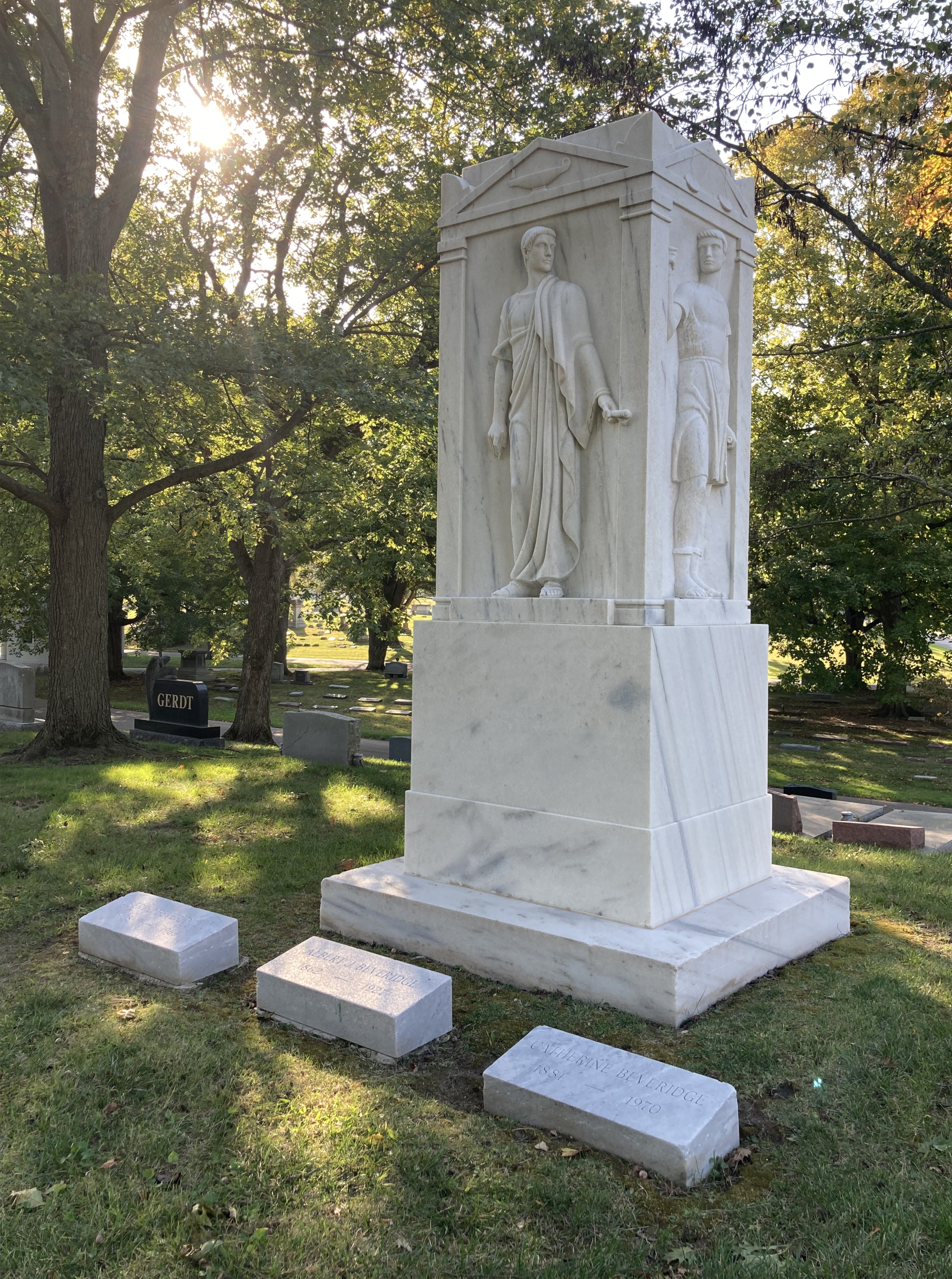
Beveridge's grave at Crown Hill Cemetery

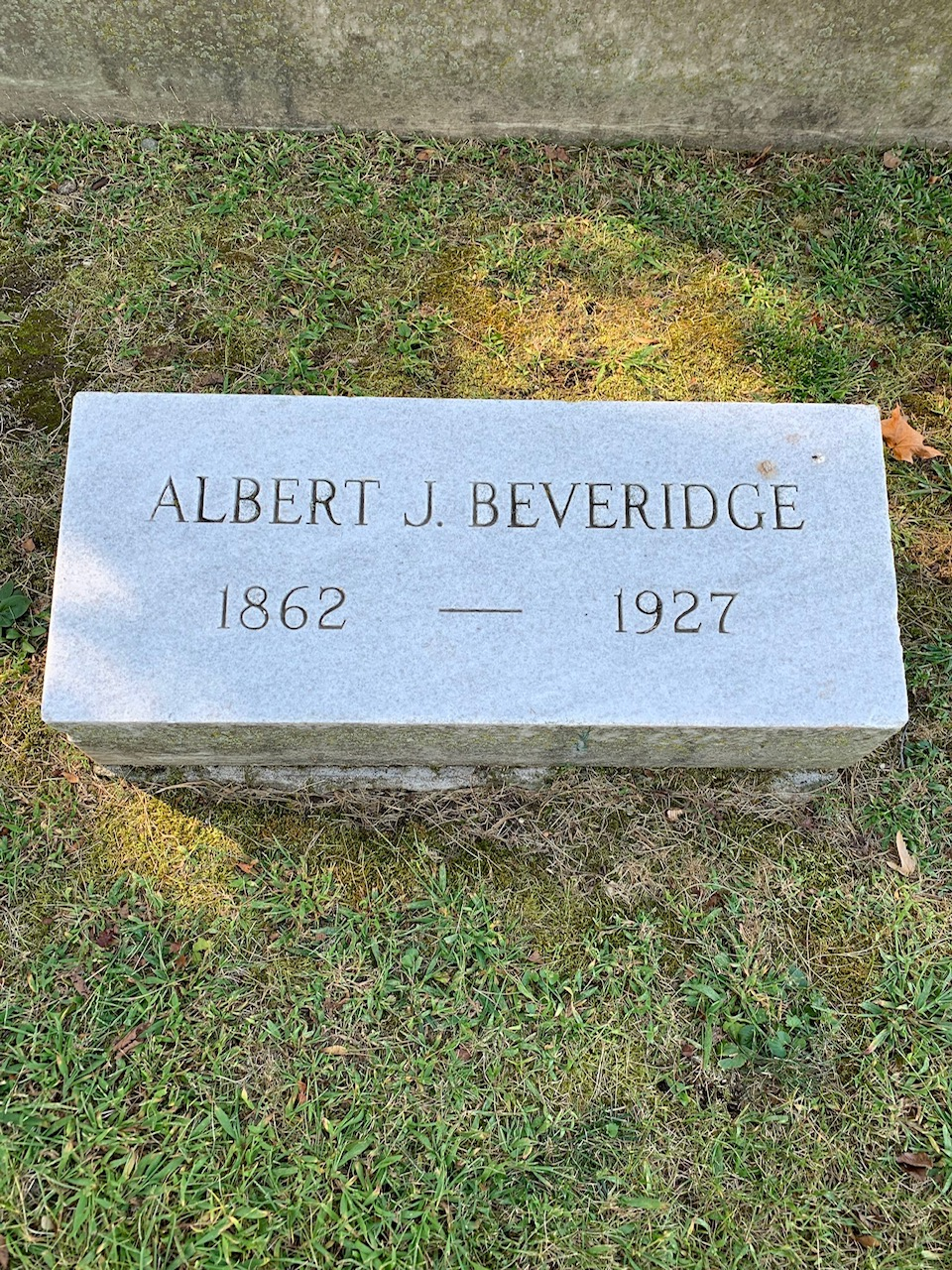
Photo of a grave at Crown Hill Cemetery provided to Wikimedia Commons by Crown Hill Foundation.

Beveridge died from a heart attack in Indianapolis on April 27, 1927, and was buried at Crown Hill Cemetery.

== Selected works ==
- "The March of the Flag" (1898)
- "In Support of an American Empire" (1900)
- "The Russian Advance" (1903)
- The Young Man and the World (1905) at Project Gutenberg.
- The Life of John Marshall, in 4 volumes (1919), Volume I, Volume II, Volume III and Volume IV at Internet Archive.
- The Meaning of the Times and other Speeches (Indianapolis: Bobbs-Merrill, 1909) at Open Library.
- Americans of Today and Tomorrow (1908)
- Pass Prosperity Around (1912)
- What is Back of the War? (Indianaopolis: Bobbs-Merrill, 1916) at Internet Archive.
- Beveridge, Albert J. (December 13, 1925). "Bowers Sustains Reputation, Says Beveridge". Indianapolis Star. pp. 41–43 (Section 4, pp. 1–3) Part 2, Part 3.
- Abraham Lincoln 1809–1858, 2 vols. (Boston: Houghton Mifflin) (1928)

U.S. Senate
Preceded by David Turpie	U.S. Senator (Class 1) from Indiana; 1899–1911; Served alongside: Charles W. Fairbanks, James A. Hemenway, Benjamin F. Shively	Succeeded by John W. Kern
Party political offices
Preceded by Harry S. New	Republican nominee for U.S. Senator from Indiana (Class 1); 1922	Succeeded by Arthur Raymond Robinson
