= New Cumberland, Ohio =

Unincorporated community in Ohio, U.S.

Coordinates: 40°32′19″N 81°18′00″W

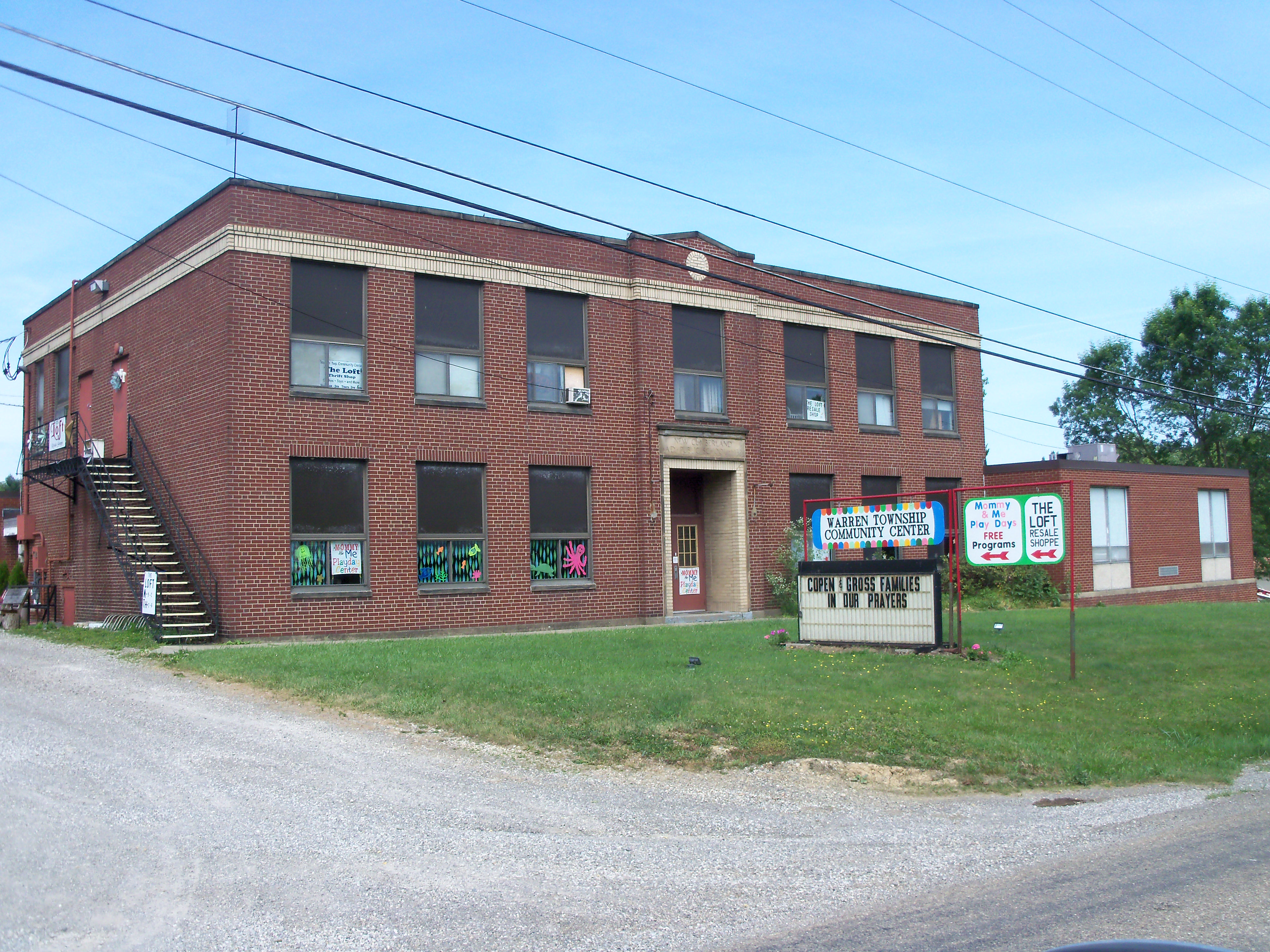
Public School is now the Warren Township Community Center.

New Cumberland is an unincorporated community in Warren Township, Tuscarawas County, Ohio, United States. The community is served by the Mineral City, Ohio post office, ZIP code 44656. It is located on Conotton Creek, State Route 212 and the Wheeling and Lake Erie Railway.

== History ==
New Cumberland was laid out and platted in 1826. A post office called New Cumberland was established in 1832, and remained in operation until 1957.

== Education ==
Students attend the Tuscarawas Valley Local School District.
