= Hawaii Five-O (1968 TV series) season 1 =

Hawaii Five-O
- Season 1
- DVD cover
- No. of episodes: 24

Release
- Original network: CBS
- Original release: September 20, 1968 – March 19, 1969

Season chronology
- Next → Season 2

The first season of Hawaii Five-O, an American television series, began September 20, 1968, and ended on March 19, 1969. It aired on CBS. The region 1 DVD was released on March 6, 2007.

== Episodes ==
No. overall	No. in season	Title	Directed by	Written by	Original release date	Prod. code
1	1	"Cocoon: Parts 1 & 2"	Paul Wendkos	Leonard Freeman	September 20, 1968	1310-1729-1383
Stephen Aloysius "Steve" McGarrett (Jack Lord) is embroiled in a tale of espionage and murder in this story, which marks the first appearance of villain Wo Fat (Khigh Dhiegh). Andrew Duggan, Leslie Nielsen, Soon-Tek Oh, Nancy Kwan and Lew Ayres guest star. NOTE: Tim O'Kelly as Danny "Danno" Williams. Mitzi Hoag as McGarrett's secretary, May. First time McGarrett says "Book 'em"
2	2	"Full Fathom Five"	Richard Benedict	Ken Kolb	September 26, 1968	1729-0202
The governor of Hawaii assigns McGarrett to break a ring of con artists swindling/killing visiting rich widows. Kevin McCarthy, Louise Troy, Arlene McQuade, June Dayton and Patricia Smith guest stars. NOTE: First appearance of James MacArthur (as Danny "Danno" Williams), Richard Denning (as the governor), Maggi Parker (as McGarrett's secretary, May) and Peggy Ryan (as the governor's secretary, Mildred). Ryan would appear as McGarrett's new secretary, Jenny Sherman, from Seasons 2 to 8. Herman Wedemeyer also guest stars.
3	3	"Strangers in Our Own Land"	Herschel Daugherty	T : Herman Groves; S/T : John Kneubuhl	October 3, 1968	1729-0203
An official's death involves strange clues, including a woman with a camera and a man with a briefcase. Simon Oakland and Milton Selzer guest stars.
4	4	"Tiger by the Tail"	Richard Benedict	Sy Salkowitz	October 10, 1968	1729-0206
A publicity stunt by a rock singer (Sal Mineo) to stage his own kidnapping backfires when ransom is offered. Harold J. Stone and Sam Melville (actor) guest stars.
5	5	"Samurai"	Alvin Ganzer	T : Mel Goldberg; S/T : Jerome Coopersmith	October 17, 1968	1729-0201
McGarrett must protect an underworld kingpin (Ricardo Montalbán) he is trying to convict of racketeering activities.
6	6	"…And They Painted Daisies on His Coffin"	John Peyser	John D. F. Black	November 7, 1968	1729-0204
The Five-O team works overtime when Danny is indicted for the murder of an apparently unarmed teenage boy. Gavin MacLeod, Luana Anders, Danny Kamekona and Charlotte Stewart guest star. NOTE #1: Edward Tom (uncredited) appears as Che Fong. NOTE #2: The evidence shows Danny fired his gun at a closed door lock with the armed suspect out of sight so Danny would have been acquitted as he was firing to break the door lock and was not firing with malice at the suspect. The sequel to this episode comes in Episode 22 of Season 3, titled "The Bomber and Mrs. Moroney".
7	7	"Twenty-Four Karat Kill"	Alvin Ganzer	David P. Harmon	November 14, 1968	1729-0205
The owner of a tuna boat uses his craft to smuggle gold bars into the islands. This episode contains the first use of McGarrett's three-word catchphrase, "Book 'em, Danno". Marj Dusay, Kaz Garas and Paul Richards guest star. NOTE: Richard Denning appears as Philip Grey, a U. S. Treasury agent.
8	8	"The Ways of Love"	Charles S. Dubin	Laurence Heath	November 21, 1968	1729-0207
McGarrett goes under cover in a California prison to find the connection between a girl's death and the theft of a gem collection. Don Knight guest stars.
9	9	"No Blue Skies"	Herschel Daugherty	Herman Groves	December 5, 1968	1729-0209
A no-talent singer (Tommy Sands) turns to cat burglary when his musical efforts fail to satisfy his mounting gambling debts.
10	10	"By the Numbers"	Seymour Robbie	Mark Rodgers	December 12, 1968	1729-0215
A U.S. serviceman, in Hawaii for R&R, becomes a pawn in a fight for control of a numbers syndicate. The head of the outfit is killed and the serviceman has been framed for it. Five-O races to solve the killing, shut down the numbers syndicate and prevent the serviceman from becoming the next homicide victim. Johnny Crawford, Anne Helm, Will Kuluva, Jonathan Goldsmith, Randall Duk Kim, Richard Benedict, Herman Wedemeyer guest star.
11	11	"Yesterday Died and Tomorrow Won't Be Born"	Herschel Daugherty	John D. F. Black	December 19, 1968	1729-0211
While searching for the killer who critically wounded Steve, Danny foolishly tips his hand to the killer (John Larch) when he questions the suspect's wife instead of staking out her home.
12	12	"Deathwatch"	Herschel Daugherty	Shirl Hendryx	December 25, 1968	1729-0213
Five-O fights to save the life of a gangster (Nehemiah Persoff) so that he can testify against his boss (James Shigeta).
13	13	"Pray Love Remember, Pray Love Remember"	Richard Benedict	S : Leonard Freeman; T : John D. F. Black	January 1, 1969	1729-0216
When a young Indonesian student is murdered, McGarrett searches for the prime suspect. NOTE: Danny Kamekona appears as Che Fong.
14	14	"King of the Hill"	Jack Shea	S : Leonard Freeman; T : John D. F. Black	January 8, 1969	1729-0208
A Marine Vietnam veteran (Yaphet Kotto) suffers a breakdown and, believing he is back in Vietnam, takes Danny hostage in a hospital ward, and Steve is willing to risk the lives of everyone in the ward to save him.
15	15	"Up Tight"	Seymour Robbie	S : David Harmon; T : Mel Goldberg	January 15, 1969	1729-0210
McGarrett attempts to get the goods on David Stone (Ed Flanders), a professor-turned-guru who introduces young people to drugs, but does not use them himself.
16	16	"Face of the Dragon"	Richard Benedict	Robert C. Dennis	January 22, 1969	1729-0221
A man carrying bubonic plague arrives in the islands the same time as plans for a top-secret weapon vanish. David Opatoshu, Nancy Kovack, Soon-Tek Oh, Herb Jeffries, Jackie Coogan, Victor Sen Yung guest star.
17	17	"The Box"	Seymour Robbie	S : Leonard Freeman; S/T : John D. F. Black	January 29, 1969	1729-0220
McGarrett offers himself as a hostage in an attempted prison break by two "lifers". Gavin MacLeod, R. G. Armstrong, Gerald S. O'Loughlin, Eddie Sherman and Dan Leegant guest star.
18	18	"One for the Money"	Paul Stanley	S : Robert Stambler; T : Palmer Thompson	February 5, 1969	1729-0219
Five-O receives an anonymous letter promising to go on a killing spree. Jeanette Nolan, Farley Granger and Paul Collins guest star.
19	19	"Along Came Joey"	Richard Benedict	T : Mel Goldberg; S/T : Jerry Ludwig	February 12, 1969	1729-0214
A successful young boxer is murdered, and McGarrett has to find the murderer before the grieving father (a policeman himself) does. Jessie White, Peter Mark Richman, Jean Hale, Hal Baylor, Charles Lampkin and Frank de Kova guest star.
20	20	"Once Upon a Time"	Michael Caffey	Leonard Freeman	February 19, 1969	1729-0212
21	21	"Once Upon a Time"	Michael Caffey and Abner Biberman	Leonard Freeman	February 26, 1969	1729-0212
Part 1: McGarrett travels to Los Angeles to help his sister (Nancy Malone) deal with her child's cancer and make the correct decision about a quack (Joanne Linville). Part 2: McGarrett continues his quest to put an end to the quack.: NOTE: Other than the pilot, Part 1 of this episode is the only non-season 12 one in which James MacArthur does not appear.
22	22	"Not That Much Different"	Abner Biberman	Mark Rodgers	March 5, 1969	1729-0222
A murder rocks a tight-knit group of left-wing hippies running Peace magazine. Law and order triumphs. Stewart Moss, Lee Paul, Ann Prentiss guest star.
23	23	"Six Kilos"	Seymour Robbie	Meyer Dolinsky	March 12, 1969	1729-0217
McGarrett goes undercover as a safe-cracker to join a gang planning a robbery at sea, with a mastermind who delivers instructions by tape. Gerald S. O'Loughlin, Antoinette Bower, Than Wyenn, Eddie Dew guest star. NOTE: Going by production order, this is the back story of Carl Swanson portrayed by Gerald S. O'Loughlin which concludes in Episode 17 ("The Box").
24	24	"The Big Kahuna"	Herschel Daugherty	S : Leonard Freeman; T : Gilbert Ralston & Norman Hudis	March 19, 1969	1729-0218
A beloved prominent Hawaiian believes he is being haunted by a malevolent spirit. John Marley, Sally Kellerman, and Robert Colbert guest star.
