= Hawaii Five-O (1968 TV series) season 9 =

Hawaii Five-O
- Season 9
- No. of episodes: 23

Release
- Original network: CBS
- Original release: September 30, 1976 – May 5, 1977

Season chronology
- ← Previous; Season 8 Next → Season 10

This is a list of episodes from the ninth season of Hawaii Five-O. Herman Wedemeyer is elevated to main cast member.

== Broadcast history ==
The season originally aired Thursdays at 9:00-10:00 pm (EST).

== DVD release ==
The season was released on DVD by Paramount Home Video.

== Episodes ==
No. overall	No. in season	Title	Directed by	Written by	Original release date	Prod. code
194	1	"Nine Dragons"	Michael O'Herlihy	Jerome Coopersmith	September 30, 1976	1310-1729-0601
195	2	"Nine Dragons"	Michael O'Herlihy	Jerome Coopersmith	September 30, 1976	1310-1729-0601
The probe of a theft of nerve gas puts McGarrett on Wo Fat's (Khigh Dhiegh) trail, which leads to Hong Kong and a case of amnesia for himself. Dina Merrill, David Tomlinson, Michael Anderson Jr. and Ric Young guest stars. NOTE: Shown in syndication in two parts.
196	3	"Assault on the Palace"	Ernest Pintoff	Jerome Coopersmith	October 7, 1976	1310-1729-0606
McGarrett must solve a daring bank robbery committed during the King Kamehameha Day parade under the cover of a historic re-enactment. Clu Gulager and Michael McGuire guest stars.
197	4	"Oldest Profession -- Latest Price"	Philip Leacock	Anne Collins	October 14, 1976	1310-1729-0607
Five-O discovers that the murders of prostitutes on the islands appears to be linked to an extortion racketeer. Elaine Joyce and Ned Beatty guest stars.
198	5	"Man on Fire"	Gordon Hessler	Stephen Kandel	October 21, 1976	1310-1729-0604
When Five-O discovers that five murder victims were killed by radiation poisoning, they must track down the one person they all came in contact with before it claims another victim. Pat Hingle, John Hillerman and Alan Fudge guest stars.
199	6	"Tour de Force, Killer Aboard"	Jerry London	Charles Larson	October 28, 1976	1310-1729-0608
A lack of information hampers Five-O's search for an international assassin. Amanda McBroom and Cliff Gorman guest stars.
200	7	"The Last of the Great Paperhangers"	Philip Leacock	Orville H. Hampton	November 4, 1976	1310-1729-0610
A forger (Kevin McCarthy) steals over $14,000 from the Five-O team, then targets a bank and the U.S. Navy. Elaine Giftos and Anthony Ponzini guest stars.
201	8	"Heads, You're Dead"	Bruce Bilson	Herman Groves	November 11, 1976	1310-1729-0609
The annual Transpacific Yacht Race from California to the islands is the scene of mutiny and murder. Amanda McBroom guest stars.
202	9	"Let Death Do Us Part"	Barry Crane	Bud Freeman	November 18, 1976	1310-1729-0614
Rather than accept parole, a prisoner escapes to prove he did not kill his wife. Zohra Lampert, Jack Kelly and Lyle Bettger guest stars.
203	10	"Double Exposure"	Sutton Roley	Dean Tait & David Deutsch	December 2, 1976	1310-1729-0617
A mobster who staged his own "death" to elude a conviction returns to reclaim his former syndicate. Meg Foster, George Wyner, Seth Sakai and Thayer David guest stars.
204	11	"Yes, My Deadly Daughter"	Bruce Bilson	S : James Menzies; T : Tim Maschler	December 16, 1976	1310-1729-0613
The daughter of a crime lord is murdering her father's appointed successors. Irene Yah-Ling Sun, Paul Hecht, Kwan Hi Lim and Clyde Kusatsu guest stars.
205	12	"Target - A Cop"	Robert Scheerer	Bill Stratton	December 23, 1976	1310-1729-0612
A vengeful ex-convict (Don Stroud), partially paralyzed by a police bullet, begins killing police officers. Gerald McRaney and Seth Sakai guest stars.
206	13	"The Bells Toll at Noon"	Jack Lord	S : Irv Pearlberg; T : Charles Larson	January 6, 1977	1310-1729-0611
An avenging man (Rich Little) pursues a drug dealer who contributed to a former addict's death. Milton Selzer, Don Knight and Mel Ferrer guest stars.
207	14	"Man in a Steel Frame"	Allen Reisner	Robert Stambler	January 13, 1977	1310-1729-0619
McGarrett is a victim of an elaborate plot to frame him for murder of his girlfriend (Camilla Sparv). Jonathan Goldsmith and Danny Kamekona guest stars.
208	15	"Ready... Aim..."	Jerry London	Tim Maschler	January 20, 1977	1310-1729-0623
The Five-O team helps a Tokyo cop smash a ring that smuggles handguns into Japan. France Nuyen, Manu Tupou, Edward James Olmos and Roger Perry guest stars.
209	16	"Elegy in a Rain Forest"	Sutton Roley	Herman Groves	January 27, 1977	1310-1729-0620
McGarrett fears a rapist-murderer (William C. Watson) roaming Oahu will find a girl (Laurie Prange) lost in the mountains before Five-O can rescue her. NOTE: Final series appearance of Glenn Cannon in the role of District Attorney John Manicote.
210	17	"Dealer's Choice...Blackmail"	Ernest Pintoff	Tim Maschler	February 3, 1977	1310-1729-0605
The head of a gambling syndicate kills a police officer in a hit-and-run auto accident. John Ritter, Nehemiah Persoff guest stars. NOTE: Final series appearance of Amanda McBroom in the role of HPD officer Sandi Welles.
211	18	"A Capitol Crime"	Sutton Roley	S : James Menzies; T : Bill Stratton	February 17, 1977	1310-1729-0624
An elderly man (Barnard Hughes) wires himself to a bomb and takes hostages to halt his home's demolition. Sharon Farrell and Richard Davalos guest stars. NOTE: Jimmy Borges in the role as himself.
212	19	"To Die in Paradise"	Joe Manduke	Bill Stratton	February 24, 1977	1310-1729-0603
A singer (Pamela Franklin) held for ransom is shipwrecked with her kidnappers (Christopher Connelly and Stephen Young
213	20	"Blood Money is Hard to Wash"	Allen Reisner	S : Curtis Kenyon; T : Bill Stratton	March 3, 1977	1310-1729-0622
Mainland gangster needing a place to launder money tries to force a football-club owner to sell his team. Dane Clark and Jo Anne Worley guest stars. NOTE: Lynne Kimoto as McGarrett's secretary, Lani.
214	21	"To Kill a Mind"	Gordon Hessler	Stephen Kandel	March 17, 1977	1310-1729-0616
The kidnapping of an oceanographer's brother is linked to the recovery of a computer. Pat Hingle and Mel Ferrer guest stars.
215	22	"Requiem for a Saddle Bronc Rider"	Harry Harris	Herman Groves	March 24, 1977	1310-1729-0615
The Five-O team are finding a lot of resistance while searching for a cowboy at the rodeo grounds where he was working. George DiCenzo and Nicholas Hammond guest stars
216	23	"See How She Runs"	Harvey Laidman	Anne Collins	March 31, 1977	1310-1729-0621
The team track down the daughter (Jessica Harper) of a Los Angeles lawman (Biff McGuire) who has taken refuge with a religious cult after she is framed for murder. However, the real person (Paul Shenar) that was responsible for the crime is also searching for her.
217	24	"Practical Jokes Can Kill You"	Ernest Pintoff	Bill Stratton	May 5, 1977	1310-1729-0618
A hang glider's theft of a historical exhibit catches the attention of crooks planning a heist of Army rifles. Lee Purcell, Charles Frank, Allan Rich guest stars.
