= Savage Sunday =

Savage Sunday may refer to:

- A 1968 episode of the television series Hawaii Five-O.
- A 1975 episode of the television series Starsky & Hutch.
