= Hawaii Five-O (1968 TV series) season 10 =

Hawaii Five-O
- Season 10
- No. of episodes: 24

Release
- Original network: CBS
- Original release: September 15, 1977 – May 4, 1978

Season chronology
- ← Previous; Season 9 Next → Season 11

This is a list of episodes from the tenth season of Hawaii Five-O. This season marks the final series appearance of Kam Fong Chun.

== Broadcast history ==
The season originally aired Thursdays at 9:00-10:00 pm (EST).

== DVD release ==
The season was released on DVD by Paramount Home Video.

== Episodes ==
No. overall	No. in season	Title	Directed by	Written by	Original release date	Prod. code
218	1	"Up the Rebels"	Don Weis	Robert Janes	September 15, 1977	1310-1729-0701
An Irish terrorist (Stephen Boyd) poses as a priest in order to buy bombs and weapons in Hawaii for use in his home country. NOTE: This was Boyd's final role; he died three months before the episode's first airing. Final filmed appearance of recurring character Che Fong (Harry Endo).
219	2	"You Don't See Many Pirates These Days"	Ronald Satlof	S : James Lydon; T : Bill Stratton	September 22, 1977	1310-1729-0708
McGarrett teams with a Navy commander (Mark Lenard) to search for a cargo ship hijacked by armed and dangerous men. NOTE: First appearance of Charlie, the forensic laboratory assistant (here played by Josie Over).
220	3	"The Cop on the Cover"	Paul Stanley	T : Gerry Day; S/T : Anne Collins	September 29, 1977	1310-1729-0704
When a magazine reporter (Jean Simmons) writes a story about Five-O, McGarrett tries to discreetly locate two missing children.
221	4	"The Friends of Joey Kalima"	Douglas Green and Don Weis	Robert Janes	October 13, 1977	1310-1729-0706
Rookie cop Joey Kalima (John Rubinstein) is framed for departmental corruption by a group attempting to rob a bank. Alan Oppenheimer and Elaine Giftos guest stars. NOTE: Charlie, the forensic laboratory assistant, is played by Lydia Lei Kayahara.
222	5	"The Descent of the Torches"	Douglas Green	Alvin Sapinsley	October 20, 1977	1310-1729-0712
A mysterious intruder kills two members of an archaeological dig that is attempting to find a king's burial site. George DiCenzo, Geraldine Page and Lou Richards guest stars.
223	6	"The Ninth Step"	Dennis Donnelly	Robert Pirosh	October 27, 1977	1310-1729-0710
A recovering alcoholic ex-cop (Gil Gerard) puts his life in danger after he returns to Hawaii to make amends to McGarrett. Emilio Delgado guest stars.
224	7	"Shake Hands with the Man on the Moon"	Ronald Satlof	S : Diana Kopald Marcus; S/T : Robert Janes	November 10, 1977	1310-1729-0714
A reporter investigating a sleazy real estate developer is murdered, but the developer has an air-tight alibi. Allan Miller and Christina Hart guest stars.
225	8	"Deadly Doubles"	Marc Daniels	Robert Janes	November 17, 1977	1310-1729-0705
A Soviet tennis star is caught up in a murder after she decides to defect to be with her American boyfriend. Kurt Russell, Tim Matheson and Stefan Gierasch guest stars. NOTE: Charlie, the forensic laboratory assistant, is played by Lydia Lei Kayahara.
226	9	"Deep Cover"	Steven H. Stern	Robert Janes	December 8, 1977	1310-1729-0717
A Soviet spy ring led by a femme fatale kidnaps an engineer on a nuclear sub and steals classified data. Geoffrey Lewis and Maud Adams guest stars.
227	10	"Tsunami"	Harvey S. Laidman	Don Balluck	December 22, 1977	1310-1729-0707
A group of students create a fake tsunami so that they can rob a bank after the city is evacuated. Leigh McCloskey, Ayn Ruymen, Sidney Clute and Lyle Bettger guest stars.
228	11	"East Wind, Ill Wind"	Reza Badiyi	Edwin Blum	December 29, 1977	1310-1729-0703
After an Asian diplomat drowns in a pool, his wife is convinced forces from their home country are responsible. Sian Barbara Allen, Marisa Pavan, Michael Durrell and Bill Edwards guest stars. NOTE: Final series appearance of Bill Edwards as the character Jonathan Kaye; Lyle Bettger would take over the role in Episode 15.
229	12	"Tread the King's Shadow"	Reza Badiyi	Harold Swanton	January 5, 1978	1310-1729-0713
The Governor asks a reluctant McGarrett to investigate the kidnapping of a racist shipping-magnate's daughter. James Sikking and John Marley guest stars.
230	13	"The Big Aloha"	Marc Daniels	Gerry Day	January 12, 1978	1310-1729-0716
A physician is shot to death on a remote island and a young doctor from a local clinic is the prime suspect. Eleanor Parker, Lara Parker, Cal Bellini and John Reilly guest stars.
231	14	"A Short Walk on the Longshore"	Don Weis	Richard DeLong Adams	February 2, 1978	1310-1729-0720
A candidate to head a longshoreman's union is murdered in broad daylight, yet there are few clues about the crime. With few leads, McGarrett decides to locate the girlfriend of the murdered candidate, whom he believes has vital information about the crime, by going undercover. Sharon Farrell, Michael Conrad and Milton Selzer guest stars.
232	15	"The Silk Trap"	Dennis Donnelly	Robert Janes	February 9, 1978	1310-1729-0726
A congressman (David Birney) cheats on his wife while judging a beauty contest, and is blackmailed by a dangerous man (Soon-Tek Oh). NOTE: This was Kam Fong's final episode to be filmed. Lyle Bettger takes over the role of Jonathan Kaye.
233	16	"Head to Head"	Jack Whitman	Leonard B. Kaufman	February 16, 1978	1310-1729-0725
McGarrett teams with an FBI agent after the syndicate sends a hit man to kill an organized-crime informant. Charles Cioffi and George Grizzard guest stars.
234	17	"Tall on the Wave"	Ronald Satlof	Bill Stratton	March 2, 1978	1310-1729-0711
When judging a surfing contest, Danny investigates the murder of a competitor's two-timing girlfriend. Lisa Eilbacher guest star. NOTE: Final appearance of Charlie, the forensic laboratory assistant (here played by Lydia Lei Kayahara).
235	18	"Angel in Blue"	Allen Reisner	Irv Pearlberg	March 9, 1978	1310-1729-0702
After one of Five-O's undercover men is shot in the back, McGarrett enlists a Maui policewoman's help. Vic Tayback, Carol Lynley and Enrique Novi guest stars.
236	19	"When Does a War End?"	Ernest Pintoff	Arthur Bernard Lewis	March 16, 1978	1310-1729-0719
A young man (David Dukes) seeks revenge on a Japanese American businessman who once tortured his father in a Japanese prison camp.
237	20	"Invitation to Murder"	Harry Harris	Seeleg Lester	March 23, 1978	1310-1729-0718
The heirs to a wealthy murdered artist are now falling victim to lethal booby traps set in their prized possessions. Christina Kokubo, Anthony Caruso, Eduard Franz and Lyle Bettger guest stars.
238	21	"Frozen Assets"	Reza Badiyi	Seeleg Lester & Sam Neuman	March 30, 1978	1310-1729-0724
Five-O is summoned after a mystery writer (Mildred Natwick) investigates a fraudulent, and murderous, cryogenics outfit. Peter Lawford guest stars. NOTE: First appearance of the character Millicent Shand.
239	22	"My Friend, the Enemy"	Noel Black	Gerry Day	April 13, 1978	1310-1729-0721
A reporter (Luciana Paluzzi) from an Italian magazine unearths a plot to kidnap a visiting Middle Eastern princess. (Similar to episode "The Cop on The Cover")
240	23	"A Stranger in His Grave"	Richard Benedict	Arthur Bernard Lewis	April 27, 1978	1310-1729-0722
After the body of a wealthy rancher is found in a burning cane field, his widow becomes a prime suspect. Andrew Prine, Laraine Stephens, Ted Markland and John Hillerman guest stars. NOTE: This episode marks the final appearance of recurring character Jonathan Kaye (here played by Lyle Bettger).
241	24	"A Death in the Family"	Don Weis	Robert Janes	May 4, 1978	1310-1729-0723
When the Five-O team suffers a devastating loss with its close-knit ranks, an enraged McGarrett asks a Hawaiian organized crime boss for help. Reni Santoni and Manu Tupou guest stars.
