= List of Hawaii Five-O (1968 TV series) episodes =

Hawaii Five-O is a police procedural television series created by Leonard Freeman for the CBS television network. Starring Jack Lord, the series premiered on September 20, 1968, and ended after 12 seasons on April 4, 1980, during which time 282 episodes were produced and broadcast. The series covers a fictional special state task force for the state of Hawaii led by Detective Steve McGarrett (Jack Lord).

To date, all 12 seasons have been released on DVD in Region 1, as well as the first seven seasons for Regions 2 and 4. Except "Bored, She Hung Herself" which is banned.

== Series overview ==
Season	Episodes	Originally released		Rank	Rating
Season	Episodes	First released	Last released	Rank	Rating
1	24	September 20, 1968	March 19, 1969	46	18.1
2	25	September 24, 1969	March 11, 1970	19	21.1
3	24	September 16, 1970	March 10, 1971	7	25.0
4	24	September 14, 1971	March 7, 1972	12	23.6
5	24	September 12, 1972	March 13, 1973	3	25.2
6	24	September 11, 1973	February 26, 1974	5	24.0
7	24	September 10, 1974	March 25, 1975	10	24.8
8	24	September 12, 1975	March 4, 1976	39	N/A
9	24	September 30, 1976	May 5, 1977	18	21.9 (Note: Tied with 60 Minutes)
10	24	September 15, 1977	May 4, 1978	23	20.4
11	22	September 28, 1978	April 5, 1979	44	18.0
12	19	October 4, 1979	April 5, 1980	47	—N/a

== Episodes ==
=== Season 1 (1968–69) ===
No. overall	No. in season	Title	Directed by	Written by	Original release date	Prod. code
1	1	"Cocoon: Parts 1 & 2"	Paul Wendkos	Leonard Freeman	September 20, 1968	1310-5246-2669
2	2	"Full Fathom Five"	Richard Benedict	Ken Kolb	September 26, 1968	1729-0202
3	3	"Strangers in Our Own Land"	Herschel Daugherty	T : Herman Groves; S/T : John Kneubuhl	October 3, 1968	1729-0203
4	4	"Tiger by the Tail"	Richard Benedict	Sy Salkowitz	October 10, 1968	1729-0206
5	5	"Samurai"	Alvin Ganzer	T : Mel Goldberg; S/T : Jerome Coopersmith	October 17, 1968	1729-0201
6	6	"…And They Painted Daisies on His Coffin"	John Peyser	John D. F. Black	November 7, 1968	1729-0204
7	7	"Twenty-Four Karat Kill"	Alvin Ganzer	David P. Harmon	November 14, 1968	1729-0205
8	8	"The Ways of Love"	Charles S. Dubin	Laurence Heath	November 21, 1968	1729-0207
9	9	"No Blue Skies"	Herschel Daugherty	Herman Groves	December 5, 1968	1729-0209
10	10	"By the Numbers"	Seymour Robbie	Mark Rodgers	December 12, 1968	1729-0215
11	11	"Yesterday Died and Tomorrow Won't Be Born"	Herschel Daugherty	John D. F. Black	December 19, 1968	1729-0211
12	12	"Deathwatch"	Herschel Daugherty	Shirl Hendryx	December 25, 1968	1729-0213
13	13	"Pray Love Remember, Pray Love Remember"	Richard Benedict	S : Leonard Freeman; T : John D. F. Black	January 1, 1969	1729-0216
14	14	"King of the Hill"	Jack Shea	S : Leonard Freeman; T : John D. F. Black	January 8, 1969	1729-0208
15	15	"Up Tight"	Seymour Robbie	S : David Harmon; T : Mel Goldberg	January 15, 1969	1729-0210
16	16	"Face of the Dragon"	Richard Benedict	Robert C. Dennis	January 22, 1969	1729-0221
17	17	"The Box"	Seymour Robbie	S : Leonard Freeman; S/T : John D. F. Black	January 29, 1969	1729-0220
18	18	"One for the Money"	Paul Stanley	S : Robert Stambler; T : Palmer Thompson	February 5, 1969	1729-0219
19	19	"Along Came Joey"	Richard Benedict	T : Mel Goldberg; S/T : Jerry Ludwig	February 12, 1969	1729-0214
20	20	"Once Upon a Time: Part 1"	Michael Caffey	Leonard Freeman	February 19, 1969	1729-0212
21	21	"Once Upon a Time: Part 2"	Michael Caffey and Abner Biberman	Leonard Freeman	February 26, 1969	1729-0212
22	22	"Not That Much Different"	Abner Biberman	Mark Rodgers	March 5, 1969	1729-0222
23	23	"Six Kilos"	Seymour Robbie	Meyer Dolinsky	March 12, 1969	1729-0217
24	24	"The Big Kahuna"	Herschel Daugherty	S : Leonard Freeman; T : Gilbert Ralston & Norman Hudis	March 19, 1969	1729-0218

=== Season 2 (1969–70) ===
No. overall	No. in season	Title	Directed by	Written by	Original release date	Prod. code
25	1	"A Thousand Pardons - You're Dead!"	Nicholas Colasanto	S : Paul Harber; S/T : Mel Goldberg	September 24, 1969	1729-0259
26	2	"To Hell with Babe Ruth"	Nicholas Colasanto	Anthony Lawrence	October 1, 1969	1729-0254
27	3	"Forty Feet High and It Kills!"	Michael O'Herlihy	S : Edward J. "Ed" Lakso; S/T : Robert C. Dennis	October 8, 1969	1729-0260
28	4	"Just Lucky, I Guess"	Nicholas Colasanto	T : Mel Goldberg; S/T : Jay Roberts	October 15, 1969	1729-0255
29	5	"Savage Sunday"	Reza Badiyi	Palmer Thompson	October 22, 1969	1729-0252
30	6	"A Bullet for McGarrett"	Paul Stanley	S : Jay Roberts; S/T : Anthony Lawrence	October 29, 1969	1729-0262
31	7	"Sweet Terror"	Richard Benedict	Robert C. Dennis	November 5, 1969	1729-0251
32	8	"King Kamehameha Blues"	Barry Shear	Robert Hamner	November 12, 1969	1729-0257
33	9	"The Singapore File"	Robert Gist	Robert C. Dennis	November 19, 1969	1729-0258
34	10	"All the King's Horses"	Richard Benedict	William Robert Yates	November 26, 1969	1729-0253
35	11	"Leopard on the Rock"	Irving J. Moore	Palmer Thompson	December 3, 1969	1729-0263
36	12	"The Devil and Mr. Frog"	Michael O'Herlihy	S : Robert Lewin; S/T : Robert C. Dennis	December 10, 1969	1729-0267
37	13	"The Joker's Wild, Man, Wild!"	Gene Nelson	Jack Turley	December 17, 1969	1729-0264
38	14	"Which Way Did They Go?"	Abner Biberman	Meyer Dolinsky	December 24, 1969	1729-0256
39	15	"Blind Tiger"	Abner Biberman	S : William Robert Yates; S/T : Jerome Coopersmith	December 31, 1969	1729-0265
40	16	"Bored, She Hung Herself"	John Newland	Mel Goldberg	January 7, 1970	1729-0266
41	17	"Run, Johnny, Run"	Michael O'Herlihy	Mel Goldberg	January 14, 1970	1729-0269
42	18	"Killer Bee"	Paul Stanley	Anthony Lawrence	January 21, 1970	1729-0270
43	19	"The One with the Gun"	Murray Golden	Robert C. Dennis	January 28, 1970	1729-0271
44	20	"Cry, Lie"	Paul Stanley	Preston Wood	February 4, 1970	1729-0273
45	21	"Most Likely to Murder"	Nicholas Colasanto	Robert Hamner	February 11, 1970	1729-0261
46	22	"Nightmare Road"	John Newland	Jack Turley	February 18, 1970	1729-0272
47	23	"Three Dead Cows at Makapuu (Part 1)"	Marvin J. Chomsky	S : Leonard Freeman; T : Anthony Lawrence	February 25, 1970	1729-0274
48	24	"Three Dead Cows at Makapuu (Part 2)"	Marvin J. Chomsky	Anthony Lawrence	March 4, 1970	1729-0274
49	25	"Kiss the Queen Goodbye"	Abner Biberman	Jack Turley	March 11, 1970	1729-0268

=== Season 3 (1970–71) ===
No. overall	No. in season	Title	Directed by	Written by	Original release date	Prod. code
50	1	"And a Time to Die…"	Charles Dubin	Ken Pettus	September 16, 1970	1729-0303
51	2	"Trouble in Mind"	Danny Arnold	Mel Goldberg & Sasha Gilien	September 23, 1970	1729-0304
52	3	"The Second Shot"	Michael O'Herlihy	Eric Bercovici	September 30, 1970	1729-0300
53	4	"Time and Memories"	John Llewellyn Moxey	Jerry Ludwig	October 7, 1970	1729-0301
54	5	"The Guarnerius Caper"	Tony Leader	Ken Pettus	October 14, 1970	1729-0311
55	6	"The Ransom"	Michael O'Herlihy	Eric Bercovici & Jerry Ludwig	October 21, 1970	1729-0310
56	7	"Force of Waves"	Paul Krasny	T : Eric Bercovici; S/T : Mark Rodgers	October 28, 1970	1729-0306
57	8	"The Reunion"	Michael O'Herlihy	Paul Playdon	November 4, 1970	1729-0308
58	9	"The Late John Louisiana"	Paul Stanley	S : Lionel E. Siegel; T : Eric Bercovici & Jerry Ludwig	November 11, 1970	1729-0307
59	10	"The Last Eden"	Paul Stanley	Eric Bercovici & Jerry Ludwig	November 18, 1970	1729-0314
60	11	"Over Fifty? Steal"	Bob Sweeney	E. Arthur Kean	November 25, 1970	1729-0309
61	12	"Beautiful Screamer"	Tony Leader	Stephen Kandel	December 2, 1970	1729-0313
62	13	"The Payoff"	John Llewellyn Moxey	Ken Pettus	December 9, 1970	1729-0316
63	14	"The Double Wall"	Michael O'Herlihy	Jerry Ludwig & Eric Bercovici	December 16, 1970	1729-0320
64	15	"Paniolo"	Michael O'Herlihy	Ed Adamson	December 30, 1970	1729-0302
65	16	"Ten Thousand Diamonds and a Heart"	Paul Stanley	E. Arthur Kean	January 6, 1971	1729-0318
66	17	"To Kill or Be Killed"	Paul Stanley	Anthony Lawrence	January 13, 1971	1729-0312
67	18	"F.O.B. Honolulu (Part 1)"	Michael O'Herlihy	Eric Bercovici & Jerry Ludwig	January 27, 1971	1729-0321
68	19	"F.O.B. Honolulu (Part 2)"	Michael O'Herlihy	Jerry Ludwig & Eric Bercovici	February 3, 1971	1729-0321
69	20	"The Gunrunner"	Tony Leader	James D. Buchanan & Ronald Austin	February 10, 1971	1729-0317
70	21	"Dear Enemy"	Murray Golden	Jackson Gillis	February 17, 1971	1729-0319
71	22	"The Bomber and Mrs. Moroney"	Paul Stanley	Jerry Ludwig & Eric Bercovici	February 24, 1971	1729-0315
72	23	"The Grandstand Play (Part 1)"	Paul Stanley	Adrian Spies	March 3, 1971	1729-0305
73	24	"The Grandstand Play (Part 2)"	Paul Stanley	T : Eric Bercovici & Jerry Ludwig; S/T : Adrian Spies	March 10, 1971	1729-0305

=== Season 4 (1971–72) ===
No. overall	No. in season	Title	Directed by	Written by	Original release date	Prod. code
74	1	"Highest Castle, Deepest Grave"	Charles S. Dubin	S : Elick Moll & Joseph Than; T : Jerome Coopersmith	September 14, 1971	1729-0361
75	2	"No Bottles… No Cans… No People"	Michael O'Herlihy	Jerry Ludwig & Eric Bercovici	September 21, 1971	1729-0355
76	3	"Wednesday, Ladies Free"	Michael O' Herlihy	T : Jerome Coopersmith; S/T : Paul Playdon	September 28, 1971	1729-0359
77	4	"3,000 Crooked Miles to Honolulu"	Jerry Thorpe	Jerome Coopersmith	October 5, 1971	1729-0356
78	5	"Two Doves and Mr. Heron"	Charles S. Dubin	Anthony Lawrence	October 12, 1971	1729-0354
79	6	"…And I Want Some Candy and a Gun That Shoots"	Michael O'Herlihy	John D. F. Black	October 19, 1971	1729-0358
80	7	"Air Cargo… Dial for Murder"	Michael O'Herlihy	Meyer Dolinsky	October 26, 1971	1729-0363
81	8	"For a Million… Why Not?"	Ron Winston	S : Eric Bercovici & Jerry Ludwig; T : Jerome Coopersmith	November 2, 1971	1729-0366
82	9	"The Burning Ice"	Paul Stanley	Ken Pettus	November 9, 1971	1729-0351
83	10	"Rest in Peace, Somebody"	Paul Stanley	John D.F. Black	November 16, 1971	1729-0353
84	11	"A Matter of Mutual Concern"	Ron Winston	Alvin Sapinsley	November 23, 1971	1729-0368
85	12	"Nine, Ten, You're Dead"	Leo Penn	Mel Goldberg	November 30, 1971	1729-0352
86	13	"Is This Any Way to Run a Paradise?"	Michael O'Herilhy	Bill Stratton	December 21, 1971	1729-0357
87	14	"Odd Man in"	Paul Stanley	E. Arthur Kean	December 28, 1971	1729-0360
88	15	"Bait Once, Bait Twice"	Alf Kjellin	S : Jerome Ross; T : Will Lorin	January 4, 1972	1729-0371
89	16	"The Ninety-Second War (Part 1)"	Bob Sweeney	S : Leonard Freeman; T : John D.F. Black	January 11, 1972	1729-0367
90	17	"The Ninety-Second War (Part 2)"	Bob Sweeney	S : Leonard Freeman; T : John D.F. Black	January 18, 1972	1729-0367
91	18	"Skinhead"	Allen Reisner	S : Will Lorin; T : Alvin Sapinsley	January 25, 1972	1729-0372
92	19	"While You're at It, Bring in the Moon"	Michael O'Herlihy	E. Arthur Kean	February 1, 1972	1729-0370
93	20	"Cloth of Gold"	Michael O'Herlihy	Bennett Foster	February 8, 1972	1729-0365
94	21	"Good Night, Baby--Time to Die!"	Alf Kjellin	Abram S. Ginnes	February 15, 1972	1729-0373
95	22	"Didn't We Meet at a Murder?"	Paul Stanley	Jerome Coopersmith	February 22, 1972	1729-0364
96	23	"Follow the White Brick Road"	Michael O'Herihly	John Furia	February 29, 1972	1729-0369
97	24	"R & R & R"	Leo Penn	Bill Stratton	March 7, 1972	1729-0362

=== Season 5 (1972–73) ===
No. overall	No. in season	Title	Directed by	Written by	Original release date	Prod. code
98	1	"Death is a Company Policy"	Charles S. Dubin	Jerome Coopersmith	September 12, 1972	1729-0405
99	2	"Death Wish on Tantalus Mountain"	Allen Reisner	Jerome Coopersmith	September 19, 1972	1729-0411
100	3	"You Don't Have to Kill to Get Rich--But it Helps."	Alf Kjellin	Abram S. Ginnes	September 26, 1972	1729-0409
101	4	"Pig in a Blanket"	Marvin Chomsky	Bill Stratton	October 3, 1972	1729-0404
102	5	"The Jinn Who Clears the Way"	Harry Falk	John D.F. Black	October 10, 1972	1729-0418
103	6	"Fools Die Twice"	Michael O'Herilhy	Abram S. Ginnes	October 17, 1972	1729-0402
104	7	"Chain of Events"	Ron Winston	Jerome Coopersmith	October 24, 1972	1729-0407
105	8	"Journey Out of Limbo"	Michael O'Herilhy	Frank Telford	October 31, 1972	1729-0401
106	9	"V for Vashon: The Son (Part 1)"	Charles S. Dubin	Alvin Sapinsley	November 14, 1972	1729-0412
107	10	"V for Vashon: The Father (Part 2)"	Charles S. Dubin	Alvin Sapinsley	November 21, 1972	1729-0413
108	11	"V for Vashon: The Patriarch (Part 3)"	Charles S. Dubin	Alvin Sapinsley	November 28, 1972	1729-0414
109	12	"The Clock Struck Twelve"	Ron Winston	S : Leonard Freeman; T : Anthony Lawrence	December 5, 1972	1729-0410
110	13	"I'm a Family Crook--Don't Shoot!"	Bob Sweeney	Jerome Coopersmith	December 19, 1972	1729-0403
111	14	"The Child Stealers"	Corey Allen	Larry Brody	January 2, 1973	1729-0417
112	15	"Thanks for the Honeymoon"	Richard Benedict	Mel Goldberg	January 9, 1973	1729-0418
113	16	"The Listener"	Richard Benedict	Meyer Dolinsky	January 16, 1973	1729-0421
114	17	"Here Today, Gone Tonight"	Michael O'Herilhy	Jerome Coopersmith	January 23, 1973	1729-0419
115	18	"The Odd Lot Caper"	Michael O'Herilhy	T : Norman Lessing; S/T : Meyer Dolinsky	January 30, 1973	1729-0424
116	19	"Will the Real Mr. Winkler Please Die?"	Michael O'Herilhy	Jerome Coopersmith	February 6, 1973	1729-0422
117	20	"Little Girl Blue"	Bob Sweeney	S : Leonard Freeman; T : Mel Goldberg	February 13, 1973	1729-0423
118	21	"Percentage"	Robert Butler	Norman Lessing	February 20, 1973	1729-0425
119	22	"Engaged to Be Buried"	Michael O'Herilhy	T : Ken Pettus; S/T : Bill Stratton	February 27, 1973	1729-0420
120	23	"The Diamond That Nobody Stole"	Charles S. Dubin	John Furia, Jr.	March 6, 1973	1729-0406
121	24	"Jury of One"	Alf Kjellin	Ken Pettus	March 13, 1973	1729-0415

=== Season 6 (1973–74) ===
Creator and executive producer Leonard Freeman died during this season.

No. overall	No. in season	Title	Directed by	Written by	Original release date	Prod. code
122	1	"Hookman"	Allen Reisner	Glen Olson and Rod Baker	September 11, 1973	1310-1729-0457
123	2	"Draw Me a Killer"	Charles S. Dubin	Walter Black	September 18, 1973	1310-1729-0453
124	3	"Charter for Death"	Michael O'Herilhy	Carey Wilber and Sheldon Wile	September 25, 1973	1310-1729-0459
125	4	"One Big Happy Family"	Alf Kjellin	Alvin Sapinsley	October 2, 1973	1310-1729-0458
126	5	"The Sunday Torch"	Michael O'Herilhy	Jerome Coopersmith	October 9, 1973	1310-1729-0454
127	6	"Murder is a Taxing Affair"	Michael O'Herilhy	S : Tony Palmerio; S/T : Jerome Coopersmith	October 16, 1973	1310-1729-0452
128	7	"Tricks are Not Treats"	Corey Allen	Bill Stratton	October 23, 1973	1310-1729-0455
129	8	"Why Wait Till Uncle Kevin Dies?"	Michael O'Herilhy	Jerome Coopersmith	October 30, 1973	1310-1729-0456
130	9	"Flash of Color, Flash of Death"	Alf Kjellin	S : Michael Adams; S/T : Norman Lessing	November 6, 1973	1310-1729-0463
131	10	"A Bullet for El Diablo"	Allen Reisner	Tim Maschler	November 13, 1973	1310-1729-0465
132	11	"The Finishing Touch"	Charles S. Dubin	Walter Black	November 20, 1973	1310-1729-0464
133	12	"Anybody Can Build a Bomb"	Charles S. Dubin	William Bast	November 27, 1973	1310-1729-0468
134	13	"Try to Die on Time"	Charles S. Dubin	S : Jacqueline Lynch; S/T : E. Arthur Kean	December 4, 1973	1310-1729-0451
135	14	"The $100,000 Nickel"	Allen Reisner	Dick Nelson	December 11, 1973	1310-1729-0462
136	15	"The Flip Side is Death"	Paul Stanley	Glen Olson and Rod Baker	December 18, 1973	1310-1729-0467
137	16	"The Banzai Pipeline"	Richard Benedict	Bill Stratton	January 1, 1974	1310-1729-0470
138	17	"One Born Every Minute"	Charles S. Dubin	Alvin Sapinsley	January 8, 1974	1310-1729-0469
139	18	"Secret Witness"	Michael O'Herilhy	S : Sam Roeca; S/T : Ken Pettus	January 15, 1974	1310-1729-0472
140	19	"Death with Father"	Jack Lord	Anthony Lawrence	January 22, 1974	1310-1729-0461
141	20	"Murder with a Golden Touch"	Michael O'Herilhy	S : Robert Schlitt; S/T : Jerome Coopersmith	January 29, 1974	1310-1729-0471
142	21	"Nightmare in Blue"	Michael O'Herilhy	Mel Goldberg	February 5, 1974	1310-1729-0474
143	22	"Mother's Deadly Helper"	Douglas Green	Walter Black	February 12, 1974	1310-1729-0473
144	23	"Killer at Sea"	Douglas Green	S : Douglas Green; S/T : Jerome Coopersmith	February 19, 1974	1310-1729-0475
145	24	"30,000 Rooms and I Have the Key"	Charles S. Dubin	E. Arthur Kean	February 26, 1974	1310-1729-0466

=== Season 7 (1974–75) ===
No. overall	No. in season	Title	Directed by	Written by	Original release date	Prod. code
146	1	"The Young Assassins"	Bruce Bilson	Bill Stratton	September 10, 1974	1310-1729-0507
147	2	"A Hawaiian Nightmare"	Charles S. Dubin	S : Tom Philbin; S/T : William Bast	September 17, 1974	1310-1729-0501
148	3	"I'll Kill 'Em Again"	Charles S. Dubin	Tim Maschler	September 24, 1974	1310-1729-0503
149	4	"Steal Now--Pay Later"	John Peyser	Jerome Coopersmith	October 1, 1974	1310-1720-0510
150	5	"Bomb, Bomb, Who's Got the Bomb?"	Allen Reisner	Martin Roth	October 8, 1974	1310-1729-0505
151	6	"Right Grave, Wrong Body"	Paul Stanley	Glen Olson & Rod Baker	October 15, 1974	1310-1729-0504
152	7	"We Hang Our Own"	Douglas Green	Walter Black	October 22, 1974	1310-1729-0502
153	8	"The Two-Faced Corpse"	Douglas Green	Bud Freeman	October 29, 1974	1310-1729-0511
154	9	"How to Steal a Masterpiece"	Jack Lord	Bud Freeman	November 5, 1974	1310-1729-0517
155	10	"A Gun for McGarrett"	Bruce Bilson	Alvin Sapinsley	November 26, 1974	1310-1729-0515
156	11	"Welcome to Our Branch Office"	Charles S. Dubin	Jerome Coopersmith	December 3, 1974	1310-1729-0512
157	12	"Presenting...In the Center Ring...Murder"	Charles S. Dubin	Jerome Coopersmith	December 10, 1974	1310-1729-0516
158	13	"Hara-Kiri: Murder"	Paul Stanley	Norman Lessing	December 31, 1974	1310-1729-0513
159	14	"Bones of Contention"	Douglas Green	Alvin Sapinsley	January 7, 1975	1310-1729-0523
160	15	"Computer Killer"	Alf Kjellin	S : Larry Brody; S/T : Tim Maschler	January 14, 1975	1310-1729-0514
161	16	"A Woman's Work is with a Gun"	Douglas Green	Glen Olson & Rod Baker	January 21, 1975	1310-1729-0519
162	17	"Small Witness, Large Crime"	Bruce Bilson	Orville H. Hampton	January 28, 1975	1310-1729-0524
163	18	"Ring of Life"	John Peyser	Tim Maschler	February 4, 1975	1310-1729-0522
164	19	"A Study in Rage"	Allen Reisner	Martin Roth	February 11, 1975	1310-1729-0518
165	20	"And the Horse Jumped Over the Moon"	Douglas Green	Larry Brody	February 18, 1975	1310-1729-0509
166	21	"Hit Gun for Sale"	John Peyser	Martin Roth	February 25, 1975	1310-1729-0525
167	22	"The Hostage"	Allen Reisner	Bud Freeman	March 11, 1975	1310-1729-0526
168	23	"Diary of a Gun"	Douglas Green	Jerome Coopersmith	March 18, 1975	1310-1729-0521
169	24	"6,000 Deadly Tickets"	John Peyser	Leonard & Arlene Stadd	March 25, 1975	1310-1729-0508

=== Season 8 (1975–76) ===
No. overall	No. in season	Title	Directed by	Written by	Original release date	Prod. code
170	1	"Murder: Eyes Only"	Michael O'Herlihy	T : Jerome Coopersmith; S/T : Orville H. Hampton	September 12, 1975	1310-1729-0558
171	2	"Murder: Eyes Only"	Michael O'Herlihy	T : Jerome Coopersmith; S/T : Orville H. Hampton	September 12, 1975	1310-1729-0558
172	3	"McGarrett is Missing"	Bruce Bilson	Jerome Coopersmith	September 19, 1975	1310-1729-0552
173	4	"Termination with Extreme Prejudice"	Michael O'Herlihy	Norman Lessing	September 26, 1975	1310-1729-0554
174	5	"Target? The Lady"	Charles S. Dubin	Tim Maschler	October 3, 1975	1310-1729-0560
175	6	"Death's Name is SAM"	Michael O'Herlihy	Jerome Coopersmith	October 10, 1975	1310-1729-0551
176	7	"The Case Against McGarrett"	Charles S. Dubin	Alvin Sapinsley	October 17, 1975	1310-1729-0556
177	8	"The Defector"	Jerry Jameson	Stephen Kandel	October 24, 1975	1310-1729-0566
178	9	"Sing a Song of Suspense"	Bruce Bilson	Bill Stratton	October 31, 1975	1310-1729-0553
179	10	"Retire in Sunny Hawaii...Forever"	Bruce Bilson	Jerome Coopersmith	November 7, 1975	1310-1729-0555
180	11	"How to Steal a Submarine"	Michael O'Herlihy	Walter Black	November 14, 1975	1310-1729-0564
181	12	"The Waterfront Steal"	Allen Reisner	Albert Aley	November 21, 1975	1310-1729-0557
182	13	"Honor is an Unmarked Grave"	Jack Lord	Bud Freeman	November 28, 1975	1310-1729-0562
183	14	"A Touch of Guilt"	Joe Manduke	Anne Collins	December 4, 1975	1310-1729-0570
184	15	"Wooden Model of a Rat"	Phillip Leacock	Alvin Sapinsley	December 11, 1975	1310-1729-0567
185	16	"Deadly Persuasion"	Allen Reisner	Tim Maschler	December 18, 1975	1310-1729-0572
186	17	"Legacy of Terror"	Bruce Bilson	Larry Forrester	January 1, 1976	1310-1729-0565
187	18	"Loose Ends Get Hit"	Charles S. Dubin	Jerome Coopersmith	January 8, 1976	1310-1729-0568
188	19	"Anatomy of a Bribe"	Joeseph Manduke	Jerome Coopersmith	January 15, 1976	1310-1729-0575
189	20	"Turkey Shoot at Makapuu"	Ernest Pintoff	Bill Stratton	January 29, 1976	1310-1729-0574
190	21	"A Killer Grows Wings"	Philip Leacock	Orville H. Hampton	February 5, 1976	1310-1729-0561
191	22	"The Capsule Kidnapping"	Bernard McEveety	Jack Epps Jr. & Anderson G. House	February 12, 1976	1310-1729-0571
192	23	"Love Thy Neighbor, Take His Wife"	Charles S. Dubin	James Henderson	February 26, 1976	1310-1729-0563
193	24	"A Sentence to Steal"	David Friedkin	Glen Olson & Rod Baker	March 4, 1976	1310-1729-0569

=== Season 9 (1976–77) ===
No. overall	No. in season	Title	Directed by	Written by	Original release date	Prod. code
194	1	"Nine Dragons"	Michael O'Herlihy	Jerome Coopersmith	September 30, 1976	1310-1729-0601
195	2	"Nine Dragons"	Michael O'Herlihy	Jerome Coopersmith	September 30, 1976	1310-1729-0601
196	3	"Assault on the Palace"	Ernest Pintoff	Jerome Coopersmith	October 7, 1976	1310-1729-0606
197	4	"Oldest Profession -- Latest Price"	Philip Leacock	Anne Collins	October 14, 1976	1310-1729-0607
198	5	"Man on Fire"	Gordon Hessler	Stephen Kandel	October 21, 1976	1310-1729-0604
199	6	"Tour de Force, Killer Aboard"	Jerry London	Charles Larson	October 28, 1976	1310-1729-0608
200	7	"The Last of the Great Paperhangers"	Philip Leacock	Orville H. Hampton	November 4, 1976	1310-1729-0610
201	8	"Heads, You're Dead"	Bruce Bilson	Herman Groves	November 11, 1976	1310-1729-0609
202	9	"Let Death Do Us Part"	Barry Crane	Bud Freeman	November 18, 1976	1310-1729-0614
203	10	"Double Exposure"	Sutton Roley	Dean Tait & David Deutsch	December 2, 1976	1310-1729-0617
204	11	"Yes, My Deadly Daughter"	Bruce Bilson	S : James Menzies; T : Tim Maschler	December 16, 1976	1310-1729-0613
205	12	"Target - A Cop"	Robert Scheerer	Bill Stratton	December 23, 1976	1310-1729-0612
206	13	"The Bells Toll at Noon"	Jack Lord	S : Irv Pearlberg; T : Charles Larson	January 6, 1977	1310-1729-0611
207	14	"Man in a Steel Frame"	Allen Reisner	Robert Stambler	January 13, 1977	1310-1729-0619
208	15	"Ready... Aim..."	Jerry London	Tim Maschler	January 20, 1977	1310-1729-0623
209	16	"Elegy in a Rain Forest"	Sutton Roley	Herman Groves	January 27, 1977	1310-1729-0620
210	17	"Dealer's Choice...Blackmail"	Ernest Pintoff	Tim Maschler	February 3, 1977	1310-1729-0605
211	18	"A Capitol Crime"	Sutton Roley	S : James Menzies; T : Bill Stratton	February 17, 1977	1310-1729-0624
212	19	"To Die in Paradise"	Joe Manduke	Bill Stratton	February 24, 1977	1310-1729-0603
213	20	"Blood Money is Hard to Wash"	Allen Reisner	S : Curtis Kenyon; T : Bill Stratton	March 3, 1977	1310-1729-0622
214	21	"To Kill a Mind"	Gordon Hessler	Stephen Kandel	March 17, 1977	1310-1729-0616
215	22	"Requiem for a Saddle Bronc Rider"	Harry Harris	Herman Groves	March 24, 1977	1310-1729-0615
216	23	"See How She Runs"	Harvey Laidman	Anne Collins	March 31, 1977	1310-1729-0621
217	24	"Practical Jokes Can Kill You"	Ernest Pintoff	Bill Stratton	May 5, 1977	1310-1729-0618

=== Season 10 (1977–78) ===
No. overall	No. in season	Title	Directed by	Written by	Original release date	Prod. code
218	1	"Up the Rebels"	Don Weis	Robert Janes	September 15, 1977	1310-1729-0701
219	2	"You Don't See Many Pirates These Days"	Ronald Satlof	S : James Lydon; T : Bill Stratton	September 22, 1977	1310-1729-0708
220	3	"The Cop on the Cover"	Paul Stanley	T : Gerry Day; S/T : Anne Collins	September 29, 1977	1310-1729-0704
221	4	"The Friends of Joey Kalima"	Douglas Green and Don Weis	Robert Janes	October 13, 1977	1310-1729-0706
222	5	"The Descent of the Torches"	Douglas Green	Alvin Sapinsley	October 20, 1977	1310-1729-0712
223	6	"The Ninth Step"	Dennis Donnelly	Robert Pirosh	October 27, 1977	1310-1729-0710
224	7	"Shake Hands with the Man on the Moon"	Ronald Satlof	S : Diana Kopald Marcus; S/T : Robert Janes	November 10, 1977	1310-1729-0714
225	8	"Deadly Doubles"	Marc Daniels	Robert Janes	November 17, 1977	1310-1729-0705
226	9	"Deep Cover"	Steven H. Stern	Robert Janes	December 8, 1977	1310-1729-0717
227	10	"Tsunami"	Harvey S. Laidman	Don Balluck	December 22, 1977	1310-1729-0707
228	11	"East Wind, Ill Wind"	Reza Badiyi	Edwin Blum	December 29, 1977	1310-1729-0703
229	12	"Tread the King's Shadow"	Reza Badiyi	Harold Swanton	January 5, 1978	1310-1729-0713
230	13	"The Big Aloha"	Marc Daniels	Gerry Day	January 12, 1978	1310-1729-0716
231	14	"A Short Walk on the Longshore"	Don Weis	Richard DeLong Adams	February 2, 1978	1310-1729-0720
232	15	"The Silk Trap"	Dennis Donnelly	Robert Janes	February 9, 1978	1310-1729-0726
233	16	"Head to Head"	Jack Whitman	Leonard B. Kaufman	February 16, 1978	1310-1729-0725
234	17	"Tall on the Wave"	Ronald Satlof	Bill Stratton	March 2, 1978	1310-1729-0711
235	18	"Angel in Blue"	Allen Reisner	Irv Pearlberg	March 9, 1978	1310-1729-0702
236	19	"When Does a War End?"	Ernest Pintoff	Arthur Bernard Lewis	March 16, 1978	1310-1729-0719
237	20	"Invitation to Murder"	Harry Harris	Seeleg Lester	March 23, 1978	1310-1729-0718
238	21	"Frozen Assets"	Reza Badiyi	Seeleg Lester & Sam Neuman	March 30, 1978	1310-1729-0724
239	22	"My Friend, the Enemy"	Noel Black	Gerry Day	April 13, 1978	1310-1729-0721
240	23	"A Stranger in His Grave"	Richard Benedict	Arthur Bernard Lewis	April 27, 1978	1310-1729-0722
241	24	"A Death in the Family"	Don Weis	Robert Janes	May 4, 1978	1310-1729-0723

=== Season 11 (1978–79) ===
No. overall	No. in season	Title	Directed by	Written by	Original release date	Prod. code
242	1	"The Sleeper"	Barry Crane	John Melson	September 28, 1978	1310-1729-0805
243	2	"Horoscope for Murder"	Ralph Levy	Arthur Bernard Lewis	October 5, 1978	1310-1729-0806
244	3	"Deadly Courier"	Reza Badiyi	Seeleg Lester and Sam Neuman	October 12, 1978	1310-1729-0809
245	4	"The Case Against Philip Christie"	Dick Moder	Seeleg Lester	October 19, 1978	1310-1729-0802
246	5	"Small Potatoes"	Reza Badiyi	Richard DeLong Adams	October 26, 1978	1310-1729-0812
247	6	"A Distant Thunder"	Dennis Donnelly	Al Martinez	November 9, 1978	1310-1729-0801
248	7	"Death Mask"	Ralph Levy	Robert I. Holt	November 16, 1978	1310-1729-0808
249	8	"The Pagoda Factor"	Dennis Donnelly	S : Irv Pearlberg; S/T : Al Martinez	November 23, 1978	1310-1729-0807
250	9	"A Long Time Ago"	Robert L. Morrison	Arthur Bernard Lewis	November 30, 1978	1310-1729-0810
251	10	"Why Won't Linda Die?"	Jack Lord	Ken Pettus	December 14, 1978	1310-1729-0816
252	11	"The Miracle Man"	Lawrence Dobkin	Robert Janes	December 21, 1978	1310-1729-0817
253	12	"Number One with a Bullet"	Don Weis	Robert Janes	December 28, 1978	1310-1729-0813
254	13	"Number One with a Bullet"	Don Weis	Robert Janes	January 4, 1979	1310-1729-0814
255	14	"The Meighan Conspiracy"	Robert L. Morrison	Seeleg Lester	January 18, 1979	1310-1729-0819
256	15	"The Spirit Is Willie"	Reza Badiyi	S : Sam Neuman; S/T : Seeleg Lester	January 25, 1979	1310-1729-0821
257	16	"The Bark and the Bite"	Don Weis	S : Shelly Mitchell; S/T : Richard deRoy	February 8, 1979	1310-1729-0815
258	17	"Stringer"	Ray Austin	S : Paul Williams; S/T : Robert Janes	February 22, 1979	1310-1729-0822
259	18	"The Execution File"	Don Weis	Don Balluck	March 1, 1979	1310-1729-0824
260	19	"A Very Personal Matter"	Harry F. Hogan III	Robert Janes	March 15, 1979	1310-1729-0811
261	20	"The Skyline Killer"	Beau Van den Ecker	Robert Janes	March 22, 1979	1310-1729-0823
262	21	"The Year of the Horse"	Don Weis	Richard DeLong Adams	April 5, 1979	1310-1729-0803
263	22	"The Year of the Horse"	Don Weis	Richard DeLong Adams	April 5, 1979	1310-1729-0803

=== Season 12 (1979–80) ===
No. overall	No. in season	Title	Directed by	Written by	Original release date	Prod. code
264	1	"A Lion in the Streets"	Reza Badiyi	Robert Janes	October 4, 1979	1310-1729-0905
265	2	"Who Says Cops Don't Cry?"	Jack Lord	Robert Janes	October 11, 1979	1310-1729-0901
266	3	"Though the Heavens Fall"	Harry F. Hogan III	Frank Telford	October 18, 1979	1310-1729-0913
267	4	"Sign of the Ram"	Ralph Levy	Sam Roeca	October 25, 1979	1310-1729-0909
268	5	"Good Help is Hard to Find"	Beau van den Ecker	Frank Telford	November 1, 1979	1310-1729-0910
269	6	"Image of Fear"	Herbert Hirschman	James Schmerer	November 8, 1979	1310-1729-0908
270	7	"Use a Gun, Go to Hell"	Ed Abroms	Sam Roeca	November 29, 1979	1310-1729-0914
271	8	"Voice of Terror"	Beau van den Ecker	Frank Telford	December 4, 1979	1310-1729-0916
272	9	"A Shallow Grave"	Dennis Donnelly	Robert and Esther Mitchell	December 11, 1979	1310-1729-0915
273	10	"The Kahuna"	Robert L. Morrison	James Menzies	December 18, 1979	1310-1729-0912
274	11	"Labyrinth"	Barry Crane	S : Paul Playdon; T : Michael Janover	December 25, 1979	1310-1729-0904
275	12	"School for Assassins"	Don Weis	S : Carey Wilber; S/T : Frank Telford	January 1, 1980	1310-1729-0919
276	13	"For Old Times Sake"	Dennis Donnelly	S : Susan Wakeford; T : Ben Masselink	January 8, 1980	1310-1729-0917
277	14	"The Golden Noose"	Beau van den Ecker	George F. Slavin	January 15, 1980	1310-1729-0922
278	15	"The Flight of the Jewels"	Don Weis	James Menzies	March 1, 1980	1310-1729-0921
279	16	"Clash of Shadows"	Ralph Levy	George F. Slavin	March 8, 1980	1310-1729-0918
280	17	"A Bird in Hand..."	Beau van den Ecker	Sam Roeca	March 22, 1980	1310-1729-0920
281	18	"The Moroville Covenant"	Robert L. Morrison	Seeleg Lester	March 29, 1980	1310-1729-0903
282	19	"Woe to Wo Fat"	Barry Crane	Frank Telford	April 5, 1980	1310-1729-0923
