= Hawaii Five-O (1968 TV series) season 2 =

Hawaii Five-O
- Season 2
- DVD cover
- No. of episodes: 25

Release
- Original network: CBS
- Original release: September 24, 1969 – March 11, 1970

Season chronology
- ← Previous; Season 1 Next → Season 3

The second season of Hawaii Five-O, an American television series, began September 24, 1969, and ended on March 11, 1970. It aired on CBS. The region 1 DVD was released on July 31, 2007, with the episode "Bored, She Hung Herself" excluded.

== Episodes ==
No. overall	No. in season	Title	Directed by	Written by	Original release date	Prod. code
25	1	"A Thousand Pardons - You're Dead!"	Nicholas Colasanto	S : Paul Harber; S/T : Mel Goldberg	September 24, 1969	1729-0259
After the brides of three G.I.s killed in Vietnam turn up dead, the Five-O team uncovers an insurance scam run by a sergeant with a murderous grudge. Harry Guardino, BarBara Luna, James Hong, Barbara Nichols, Loretta Swit guest star. NOTE: The ending credits change from a flashing blue police motorcycle light to Hawaiian outriggers. This sequence is used all the way to the series finale.
26	2	"To Hell with Babe Ruth"	Nicholas Colasanto	Anthony Lawrence	October 1, 1969	1729-0254
Taking place on December 6 and 7, 1969, a Japanese ninja (Mark Lenard) who had been in a mental hospital since December 6, 1941 plans on carrying out his mission from 28 years earlier. NOTE: Patricia Tuscano as McGarrett's secretary, Jenny Sherman.
27	3	"Forty Feet High and It Kills!"	Michael O'Herlihy	S : Edward J. "Ed" Lakso; S/T : Robert C. Dennis	October 8, 1969	1729-0260
Fear spreads through Hawaii after rumors of a supposed imminent tsunami, but McGarrett discovers the true threat: the villainous Red Chinese agent Wo Fat has kidnapped a renowned geneticist (Will Geer) and plans to use the scientist's discoveries to create a superior race. NOTE: Peggy Ryan as McGarrett's secretary, Jenny Sherman. In Season 1, Ryan portrayed the governor's secretary, Mildred.
28	4	"Just Lucky, I Guess"	Nicholas Colasanto	T : Mel Goldberg; S/T : Jay Roberts	October 15, 1969	1729-0255
A prostitute has been murdered by a gangster, but the sole witness to the crime -- a respectable small-town hardware salesman -- is afraid to testify. To catch the killer, McGarrett uses a beautiful undercover policewoman as bait. John Randolph, Albert Paulsen, Anne Helm, Elaine Joyce guest star.
29	5	"Savage Sunday"	Reza Badiyi	Palmer Thompson	October 22, 1969	1729-0252
After a band of foreign revolutionaries steal weapons from an armory, Five-O mobilizes to bring down the terrorists. Henry Silva, Julie Gregg, Edward Colmans, Tom Nardini guest star.
30	6	"A Bullet for McGarrett"	Paul Stanley	S : Jay Roberts; S/T : Anthony Lawrence	October 29, 1969	1729-0262
A psychology professor who is secretly an agent of Wo Fat is using the power of hypnosis to turn citizens into assassins. Steve McGarrett has to stop these mind games before he becomes the next target of the hypnotist. Eric Braeden, Marianne McAndrew, Khigh Dhiegh, Sheila Larken guest star. NOTE: Danny Kamekona as Che Fong. Also, this is the only time Wo Fat and McGarrett do not have a direct encounter with one another, though both appear in the same episode.
31	7	"Sweet Terror"	Richard Benedict	Robert C. Dennis	November 5, 1969	1729-0251
Hawaii's sugar industry becomes a terrorist target for germ warfare. Can Five-O stop the ensuing sabotage? Theodore Bikel, Soon-tek Oh, Philip Ahn, Linda Marsh guest star.
32	8	"King Kamehameha Blues"	Barry Shear	Robert Hamner	November 12, 1969	1729-0257
One of Hawaii's most treasured artifacts, the robe of the late King Kamehameha, is stolen. McGarrett pursues the theft to a group of anti-establishment university students. Brandon deWilde, Jennifer Leak, Randall Duk Kim guest star.
33	9	"The Singapore File"	Robert Gist	Robert C. Dennis	November 19, 1969	1729-0258
To nail a local gangster for murder, Steve McGarrett must travel to Singapore to transport the witness to the crime. The witness is an alluring woman (Marj Dusay) who is tired of running from her past.
34	10	"All the King's Horses"	Richard Benedict	William Robert Yates	November 26, 1969	1729-0253
Five-O investigates an ex-racketeer suspected of heading a local crime syndicate, but Steve McGarrett follows a hunch that the politician seeking to indict the accused man is involved in some dirty dealings of his own. James Gregory, Jason Evers, Keye Luke, Lyle Bettger guest star.
35	11	"Leopard on the Rock"	Irving J. Moore	Palmer Thompson	December 3, 1969	1729-0263
When the plane carrying a despised dictator is forced to make an emergency landing in Hawaii, the notorious leader is marked for death… and it's up to Five-O to protect him. Titos Vandis, Paul Stevens, Joe De Santis guest star.
36	12	"The Devil and Mr. Frog"	Michael O'Herlihy	S : Robert Lewin; S/T : Robert C. Dennis	December 10, 1969	1729-0267
After a kidnapped boy escapes his captors, the boy's father enlists Five-O to recover his ransom money from the extortionists. McGarrett's only lead is from the boy: "a frog and the devil". Frank Marth, Bill Zuckert, James Hong, Melody Patterson guest star.
37	13	"The Joker's Wild, Man, Wild!"	Gene Nelson	Jack Turley	December 17, 1969	1729-0264
The stakes are murderously high when a beach boy and a playboy vie for the attentions of a seductive heiress in a bizarre card game. Beverlee McKinsey, Kaz Garas, Eddie Firestone guest star.
38	14	"Which Way Did They Go?"	Abner Biberman	Meyer Dolinsky	December 24, 1969	1729-0256
After an adversary from McGarrett's past robs a bank under the noses of Five-O, McGarrett follows a trail to Hong Kong to nab the brilliant thief. William Windom, Philip Pine, Jackie Coogan guest star. NOTE: Harry Endo as Kaspar.
39	15	"Blind Tiger"	Abner Biberman	S : William Robert Yates; S/T : Jerome Coopersmith	December 31, 1969	1729-0265
A surprise birthday party for McGarrett ends with a bang--a car-bomb explosion of his black 1968 Mercury Park Lane Brougham. The explosion leaves McGarrett blinded. As he recuperates, the Five-O team searches the islands for his would-be killer. Marion Ross guest stars. NOTE: Harry Endo takes over the role of Che Fong.
40	16	"Bored, She Hung Herself"	John Newland	Mel Goldberg	January 7, 1970	1729-0266
Five-O investigates the death of a yoga student who died while performing a dangerous yoga technique that calls for the student to asphyxiate himself. NOTE: This episode was barred from airing in syndication after a viewer reportedly imitated the deadly yoga technique featured in this episode and died. The episode is absent from both the season two DVD release and the complete series set, as well as from online streaming and digital downloads.
41	17	"Run, Johnny, Run"	Michael O'Herlihy	Mel Goldberg	January 14, 1970	1729-0269
An AWOL sailor is accused of killing a patrolman. As vengeful Navy officers seek to enact their own justice, McGarrett must protect the suspect and solve the case. Christopher Walken guest stars.
42	18	"Killer Bee"	Paul Stanley	Anthony Lawrence	January 21, 1970	1729-0270
A Vietnam vet is revealed to be behind the kidnappings of several local children. But McGarrett suspects that another soldier is using the psychologically damaged kidnapper to commit these crimes.
43	19	"The One with the Gun"	Murray Golden	Robert C. Dennis	January 28, 1970	1729-0271
After a crooked card game leads to the murder of a young honeymooner, the victim's brother sets out to find the man responsible. Now Five-O must stop the vigilante before another murder takes place. Jack Soo and John Colicos guest star.
44	20	"Cry, Lie"	Paul Stanley	Preston Wood	February 4, 1970	1729-0273
When Chin Ho Kelly is accused of taking a bribe from a drug dealer, the Five-O members defend one of their own. Martin Sheen and George Petrie guest star. NOTE: A clip scene of the shotgun murder from "All the King's Horses" is reused in this episode. Chin Ho Kelly has been with the police 22 years; has a wife and 8 children.
45	21	"Most Likely to Murder"	Nicholas Colasanto	Robert Hamner	February 11, 1970	1729-0261
A cop's wife has been murdered. When the widowed officer (Tom Skerritt) seeks revenge, Danno, his longtime friend, tries to stop him. Sam Melville (actor) guest stars.
46	22	"Nightmare Road"	John Newland	Jack Turley	February 18, 1970	1729-0272
McGarrett encounters resistance from federal agents when he attempts to uncover the mystery behind the disappearance of a gullible research scientist from his important government post. Charles Aidman, Pilar Seurat, Ronald Long guest star.
47	23	"Three Dead Cows at Makapuu"	Marvin J. Chomsky	S : Leonard Freeman; T : Anthony Lawrence	February 25, 1970	1729-0274
48	24	"Three Dead Cows at Makapuu"	Marvin J. Chomsky	Anthony Lawrence	March 4, 1970	1729-0274
Part 1 – A brilliant but emotionally unstable scientist has disappeared. He discovered a biological mutation which he calls "Q strain", which he plans to unleash as a protest against germ warfare. Ed Flanders, Loretta Swit, Joseph Sirola, Dana Elcar, Karl Swenson, H. M. Wynant guest star. NOTE: Joseph Sirola as Jonathan Kaye and would continue the role until Season 5. Part 2 — Five-O rush to find the test tube of the "Q strain" which Dr. Kline has hidden and will devastate Hawaii if not found within 12 hours.
49	25	"Kiss the Queen Goodbye"	Abner Biberman	Jack Turley	March 11, 1970	1729-0268
A jewel thief masquerading as a socialite attempts to steal a priceless emerald, "The Queen of Polynesia", from the governor's gala. But Five-O are waiting for the thief--disguised as workers at the event. Joanne Linville, George Gaynes guest star.
