= Korea Patrol =

1951 film by Max Nosseck

- Original film poster
- Directed by: Max Nosseck
- Written by: Kenneth G. Brown; Walter Shenson
- Produced by: Walter Shenson; Jack Schwarz
- Starring: Richard Emory; Benson Fong
- Cinematography: Elmer Dyer
- Edited by: Norman A. Cerf
- Music by: Alexander Gerens
- Production company: Jack Schwarz Productions
- Distributed by: Eagle-Lion Films
- Release date: January 15, 1951
- Running time: 59 minutes
- Country: United States
- Language: English

Korea Patrol (working title Korean Patrol) is a 1951 American war film directed by Max Nosseck and starring Richard Emory and Benson Fong. It is among the first Hollywood films set during the Korean War, along with The Steel Helmet and A Yank in Korea, both released in 1951. The film's sets were designed by the art director Fred Preble.

== Plot ==
When notified of the North Korean invasion of South Korea, an American officer assigned to the Republic of Korea Army leads a mixed American and South Korean six-man patrol to destroy a strategic bridge to delay the enemy's advance.

== Cast ==
- Richard Emory as Lt. Craig
- Sung Li as Ching, So. Korean runner
- Benson Fong as Kim, So. Korean scout
- Al Eben as Sgt. Abrams
- Wong Artarne as Murphy
- Danny Davenport as Cpl. Dykes
- Harold Fong as Lee
- Richard Barron as Maj. Wald
- John Close as Headquarters Captain
- Teri Duna as Korean Village Young Woman

== Reception ==
In a contemporary review for the San Francisco Chronicle, critic Luther Nichols called the film "a mildly interesting, if minor, picture" and wrote: "Eagle Lion is quick. It turned out a picture called 'Korea Patrol,' which arrived all out of breath ... as the first film in the race to bring movies up to date in a military way and cash in on current headlines. ... 'Korea Patrol' is really little more than a light probing action in advance of the heavy engagements of films yet to come. The picture was made in Hollywood, but has real footage of the Korean fighting spliced into its frequent action scenes. Yet it is exciting and at times suspenseful in its simple story ... Not much of a plot? It wasn't meant to be."
