= Al Eben =

American film, stage and television actor

- Eben in 1938
- Born: March 11, 1915; Philadelphia, Pennsylvania, U.S.
- Died: July 24, 2003 (aged 88); Los Angeles, California, U.S.
- Occupations: Film, stage and television actor
- Spouse: Slyvia Kunin

Al Eben (March 11, 1915 – July 24, 2003) was an American film, stage and television actor. He was best known for playing Doc Bergman, the medical examiner, in the American police procedural television series Hawaii Five-O.

== Early life and career ==
Eben was born in Philadelphia, Pennsylvania. He began his stage career in 1937, appearing in the stage play Pins and Needles. He then began his screen career in 1941, appearing in the film Citizen Kane. In 1942, he appeared in the film All Through the Night.

Later in his career, Eben played Doc Bergman, the medical examiner, in the CBS police procedural television series Hawaii Five-O from 1971 to 1979. He guest-starred in television programs including The Beverly Hillbillies, Petticoat Junction, Charlie's Angels, Everybody Loves Raymond and Front Page Detective. He also appeared in films such as The Harlem Globetrotters, Korea Patrol, City Across the River, The Big Heat, And Baby Makes Three, Letter from an Unknown Woman and The Secret Life of Walter Mitty.

Eben retired from acting in 2001, last appearing in the film Corky Romano.

== Personal life and death ==
Eben was married to Slyvia Kunin. Their marriage lasted until Eben's death in 2003.

Eben died on July 24, 2003, in Los Angeles, California, at the age of 88.
