= Ilikai Hotel & Luxury Suites =

Hotel and condominium in Honolulu, Hawaii

- Interactive map of the Ilikai Hotel & Luxury Suites area

General information
- Location: Honolulu, Hawaii
- Coordinates: 21°17′04″N 157°50′18″W
- Opening: 29 February 1964

Technical details
- Floor count: 26

Design and construction
- Architect: John Graham, Jr.

Other information
- Number of rooms: 343 Hotel; 80 Time share 586 Condominium

Website
- http://www.ilikaihotel.com/index.html

The Ilikai Hotel & Luxury Suites is a landmark oceanfront high rise hotel and condominium at the western end of Waikiki in Honolulu, Hawaii. When it opened in 1964, the Ilikai was the first luxury high rise hotel in Hawaii.

The Ilikai is also well known, outside of Honolulu travelers and residents, for appearing prominently in the opening credits of the long running TV series Hawaii Five-O. The show's star, Jack Lord, is standing on the Ilikai penthouse balcony as the camera dramatically zooms in on him. This same sequence is used in the opening credits of the 2010 remake, with Alex O'Loughlin replacing Lord.

== History ==
The Ilikai was developed by Chinn Ho, a self-made millionaire, and two California businessmen. The building was designed by John Graham, Jr., who also designed the Space Needle in Seattle. The original building features three wings radiating from a central point in a "Y" shape.

The building was originally intended to exclusively house 1056 apartment units, and construction began in 1961. However, when the project encountered difficulties, Ho assumed complete control of the $27 million effort, and eventually re-imagined it as a complex with 509 condominium units and 504 hotel rooms. Because the hotel rooms in the original tower were designed as apartments, they were unusually large, many with their own kitchens. Two of The Ilikai's most unique features, its external glass elevator, running express to a rooftop restaurant, were both added mid-construction when the project was re-conceived as a hotel.

The Ilikai Hotel opened on February 29, 1964, with a total of 1050 units. Due to The Ilikai's success, Ho immediately announced the construction of an adjacent additional wing, eventually known as the Yacht Harbor Tower, containing 360 more hotel rooms, located across the open air lobby and pool.

Western International Hotels assumed management of the property on January 1, 1965, and managed it until October 1971. In April 1974, Ho sold The Ilikai's hotel portion, consisting of 425 rooms in the original tower and 360 rooms in the addition, to Western International for $35 million and the hotel rejoined the chain. In 1980, Western International changed its name to Westin and the hotel was renamed The Westin Ilikai. In 1987, Westin sold The Ilikai to Arizona-based Heller-White Hotels for $55 million, and it became The Ilikai again. Jowa Hawaii Co., a subsidiary of Heller-White's lenders, the Industrial Bank of Japan, exercised an option to purchase the hotel later that year for $69.5 million. The Ilikai was renovated between 1987 and 1990, at a cost of $40 million, and Jowa Hawaii brought in Nikko Hotels to manage the hotel in 1991, when it was renamed The Ilikai Hotel Nikko Waikiki. The hotel was sold again in 2000 for $57 million to Forward One LLC, owned by the Zen family of Taiwan, and reflagged to Marriott's Renaissance brand as the Renaissance Ilikai Waikiki on February 14, 2000.

In 2006, Brian Anderson and Anekona Development Group purchased the 703-room hotel portion of the property for over $200 million and the hotel left Renaissance. The remainder of the building had been converted to 575 individually owned residential condos and 80 time-share units. In 2009, the 203 hotel rooms remaining in the Ilikai, which was facing foreclosure, were acquired by New York-based iStar Financial, which brought in Honolulu-based Aqua-Aston Hospitality to manage the property. In 2010, the Yacht Harbor tower, which had been severed from the Ilikai, reopened as a separate hotel, the Waikiki EDITION Hotel, part of Marriott's luxury boutique EDITION brand. It was renamed The Modern Honolulu Hotel in 2011, after a dispute between the owners and Marriott.

Ronald and Nancy Reagan (1968) are some of the many celebrities who have stayed at the Ilikai Hotel.
