= Chinn Ho =

American businessman (1904–1987)

Chinn Ho (26 February 1904 – 12 May 1987) was a Hawaiian of Chinese descent who became an entrepreneur, businessman, philanthropist, and self-made millionaire, pioneering Asian involvement in the Hawaiian business community.

== Career ==
For generations before the rise of Ho, the business community in Hawaii was controlled by a small group of white family business interests. Ho was able to overcome the conservative business conditions and "cracked Hawaii's bamboo curtain and gained a toehold in the haole establishment; he was the first Oriental named a trustee of one of Hawaii's landed estates, the huge Robinson estate, a bastion of Hawaiian conservatism."

In 1944, Ho founded the Capital Investment Company with $200,000. Three years later, he bought $1.2 million of stock in the Waianae Sugar Company, the first time an Asian had executed such a large purchase.

In 1959, he bought the Ilikai, Hawaii’s biggest condominium-apartment project, and transformed it to Hawaii’s first high-rise luxury resort when it opened in 1964. The building is featured in the balcony scene during the opening credits of the TV show Hawaii Five-O. (One of the fictional detectives in the series was named Chin Ho Kelly).

He was the head of the Honolulu Stock Exchange, the first Asian president of a Triple-A professional baseball team, the Hawaii Islanders, the first Asian trustee of a landed estate, and the first Asian director of Theo H. Davies & Co., one of the influential “Big Five” group of former sugarcane plantation managers that were deeply involved in Hawaiian politics.

In 1961, he purchased the Honolulu Star-Bulletin, becoming the first Asian board chairman and sole owner of a major Honolulu daily newspaper.

Known for his philanthropy, he was dubbed the "Chinese Rockefeller." Ho was popularly considered to be the inspiration for the character Hong Kong Kee in James Michener's novel, Hawaii. He died on 12 May 1987, due to heart failure.

== Family ==
He was born Ho Chin. His father is Ho Ti Yuen and his mother is Ho Kam Lan. He changed his name to Chinn Ho later, to adopt the Western practice of placing the surname last. Ho's grandfather emigrated from China in 1875.

Ho married Betty Ching on 13 October 1934 and had six children.

1. Stuart Tse Kong
2. Dean Tse Wah
3. Karen Seu Han (Mrs. Stanley Hong)
4. John Tse Nien
5. Robin Seu Moy (Mrs. John Lee)
6. Heather Seu Chinn (Mrs. Malcolm Lee)
