= Maggi Parker =

American actress (born 1927)

- Born: Marjorie Blanche Parker; 1927 (age 98–99); Nashua, New Hampshire, U.S.
- Education: Keene State College; Boston University (Master of Education)
- Occupation: Actress

Marjorie Blanche Parker (known as Maggi Parker; born 1927) is an American actress best known for her appearances in the CBS crime drama Hawaii Five-O.

== Early life ==
Parker was born in 1927 in Nashua, New Hampshire, one of six children of Charles R. Parker, a tenter frame operator. She attended elementary schools in Merrimack, and graduated from Nashua High School in 1944. She majored in education at Keene State College, and then gained a Master of Education from Boston University, then taught in New Hampshire and Massachusetts.

She then joined the US Air Force as a teacher, and worked in air force schools in Tokyo, Mallorca and Madrid (where she was principal). She studied for a PhD at the University of Southern California, but did not complete her degree, instead marrying and moving to Hawaii. There, she was a partner in a clinic in Oahu offering educational services to emotionally disturbed children and adults.

== Film career ==
In Hawaii, Parker appeared in a Kellogg's commercial, The King Family Show and I Dream of Jeannie. She also had uncredited roles in several films, including Paradise, Hawaiian Style, Kona Coast, I Sailed to Tahiti with an All Girl Crew and Hawaii. She was then cast in Hawaii Five-O as Steve McGarrett's secretary May and appeared in 14 episodes during the show's first season.

== Personal life ==
Parker was also the registration and publicity officer of The Friends of 'Iolani Palace, the former royal residence of Hawaii. She traveled with Abigail Kinoiki Kekaulike Kawānanakoa to the US and Europe in 1970, seeking original palace furnishings, and worked for the Kawānanakoa royal family for many years. She lives in Waikiki, Honolulu.
