= Harry Endo =

American actor (1922–2009)

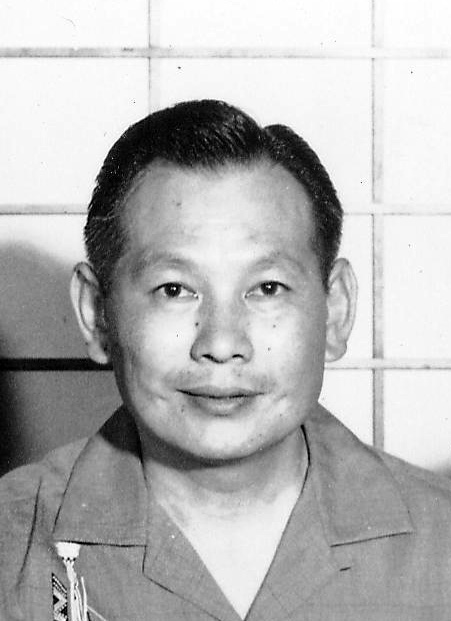
- Harry Endo (1959)
- Born: July 20, 1922; Colorado, U.S.
- Died: January 9, 2009 (aged 86); Brooklyn, New York, U.S.
- Occupation: Actor
- Spouse: Myrtle Endo
- Children: 2

Harry Endo (July 20, 1922 – January 9, 2009) was an American actor best known for his role playing Che Fong, a forensic scientist on the television series Hawaii Five-O.

Endo was born in Colorado, but spent most of his life living in Hawaii. He enlisted in the United States Army in 1941 and served as a radio operator with an infantry unit in Europe.

He had been working for Territorial Savings Bank in Hawaii and was being filmed in a commercial for his employer when he was approached about an acting role playing "Che Fong" as one of the original cast members in the television series Hawaii Five-O. The series starred Jack Lord and James MacArthur as detectives for a fictional Hawaii state police department and ran from 1968 until 1980, making it the longest running crime show on American television until it was surpassed by Law & Order in 2003. Actor Doug Mossman, who played the role of detective Frank Kamana on the show, described Endo's role in the program as portraying "the all-encompassing forensic genius, who was supposed to know everything about everything".

Endo appeared in 111 episodes of the crime drama from 1968 until 1977, and reprised his role in a 1997-hour-long made-for-television movie.

After the series ended, he played some minor roles, including two episodes of Magnum, P.I. and appeared in single episodes of both Jake and the Fatman and Murder, She Wrote, before retiring from acting in the late 1980s.

Endo died at age 86 on January 9, 2009, of a stroke at the Methodist Hospital in Brooklyn, New York City. He was survived by his wife Myrtle, to whom he had been married for more than 60 years, and two children. Myrtle Endo died in March, 2009 in Brooklyn, New York. She was 85 years old.

== Partial filmography ==
- Hawaii Five-O (1969-1977) - Che Fong / Kaspar
- Hawaii Five-0 (1997) - Che Fong (final film role)
