= Glenn Cannon =

American actor (1932–2013)

- Born: November 21, 1932
- Died: April 20, 2013 (aged 80); Honolulu, Hawaii, U.S.
- Occupation: Actor
- Known for: Hawaii Five-O, Magnum P.I.

Glenn Cannon (November 21, 1932 – April 20, 2013) was an American actor and educator best known for his roles on Hawaii Five-O and Magnum, P.I. He also appeared on Lost in a pair of different roles.

== Career ==
Cannon's career began in the 1950s with roles in shows like Alfred Hitchcock Presents, The Outer Limits and Combat!. On Magnum, P.I., Cannon was featured as Dr. Ibold, while on Hawaii Five-O, he played Attorney General John Manicote. In the mid-1960s he taught elementary school in Los Angeles at Lanai Road School in Encino, California.

He served as president of the Hawaii chapter of the Screen Actors Guild and its successor group, SAG-AFTRA.

Cannon joined the University of Hawaiʻi at Mānoa faculty in 1968 as a professor of theatre and also co-director of the UH-Manoa Cinematic and Digital Arts program.

== Personal life ==
Cannon died on April 20, 2013, in Honolulu, Hawaii.

== Partial filmography ==
- Cop Hater (1958) – Rip, Gang Leader
- Alfred Hitchcock Presents (1961) (Season 7 Episode 4: "Cop for a Day") – Davey
- Mad Dog Coll (1961) – Harry
- Hawaii Five-O (1970–1977, TV Series) (33 episodes) – John Manicote (1972–1977) and other characters (Stone / Colonel Franklin / Professor Whitney Davis / Floyd F.X. O'Neal / Carlson) (1970–1971)
- Magnum, P.I. (1981–1988, TV Series) (14 episodes) – Dr. Ibold / Dr. Bernard Kessler
- Picture Bride (1994) – Mer. Pieper
