= Hawaii Five-O (1968 TV series) season 3 =

Hawaii Five-O
- Season 3
- DVD cover
- No. of episodes: 24

Release
- Original network: CBS
- Original release: September 16, 1970 – March 10, 1971

Season chronology
- ← Previous; Season 2 Next → Season 4

The third season of Hawaii Five-O, an American television series, began September 16, 1970, and ended on March 10, 1971. It aired on CBS. The region 1 DVD was released on January 22, 2008.

== Episodes ==
No. overall	No. in season	Title	Directed by	Written by	Original release date	Prod. code
50	1	"And a Time to Die…"	Charles Dubin	Ken Pettus	September 16, 1970	1729-0303
Five-O must move swiftly to prevent a threat against the kidnapped daughter of a surgeon (Donald Moffat) who is to operate on a wounded U.S. undercover agent. Khigh Dhiegh, Gerald S. O'Loughlin, Danny Kamekona guest stars.
51	2	"Trouble in Mind"	Danny Arnold	Mel Goldberg & Sasha Gilien	September 23, 1970	1729-0304
Contaminated heroin shatters a failing singer (Nancy Wilson)'s desperate attempt at a comeback. Hawaii Five-O theme composer Morton Stevens has a cameo as a victim.
52	3	"The Second Shot"	Michael O'Herlihy	Eric Bercovici	September 30, 1970	1729-0300
McGarrett must thwart an elaborate assassination attempt on the life of a self-exiled Greek doctor (John Marley). Eric Braeden also guest stars.
53	4	"Time and Memories"	John Llewellyn Moxey	Jerry Ludwig	October 7, 1970	1729-0301
McGarrett becomes personally involved in a murder case and jeopardizes his job when his former girlfriend (Diana Muldaur) becomes the prime suspect. Edward Andrews and Martin Sheen appear in this episode.
54	5	"The Guarnerius Caper"	Tony Leader	Ken Pettus	October 14, 1970	1729-0311
Because of the foolish action of a Russian envoy, the theft of a priceless violin belonging to a Russian musician (Ed Flanders) by a pair of drugged up hippies threatens to explode into an international incident. Albert Paulsen guest stars.
55	6	"The Ransom"	Michael O'Herlihy	Eric Bercovici & Jerry Ludwig	October 21, 1970	1729-0310
Efforts by Five-O to rescue a young boy from abductors backfire when Kono becomes a prisoner of the thugs. Andrew Duggan, Lloyd Gough, Ron Hayes, Peter Bonerz guest stars.
56	7	"Force of Waves"	Paul Krasny	T : Eric Bercovici; S/T : Mark Rodgers	October 28, 1970	1729-0306
Five-O investigates the murder of a wealthy businessman in a boat explosion. John Vernon guest stars.
57	8	"The Reunion"	Michael O'Herlihy	Paul Playdon	November 4, 1970	1729-0308
A millionaire Japanese businessman is accused by three former prisoners of war of having been the officer responsible for torturing them during World War II. Simon Oakland, Teru Shimada guest stars.
58	9	"The Late John Louisiana"	Paul Stanley	S : Lionel E. Siegel; T : Eric Bercovici & Jerry Ludwig	November 11, 1970	1729-0307
McGarrett leads the search for the witness to a two-year-old murder to protect her against one of Hawaii's most-wanted criminals. Note: Before becoming a series regular in season five, Al Harrington plays one of Quon's henchman in this episode.
59	10	"The Last Eden"	Paul Stanley	Eric Bercovici & Jerry Ludwig	November 18, 1970	1729-0314
Five-O searches for the conspirators who frame a nightclub star who is outspoken against pollution. Ray Danton guest stars.
60	11	"Over Fifty? Steal"	Bob Sweeney	E. Arthur Kean	November 25, 1970	1729-0309
Lewis Avery Filer (Hume Cronyn), a former insurance investigator who was fired when he turned 50 and is now a master burglar plays cat-and-mouse with Five-O in a series of publicity-grabbing thefts, using cards from the Parker Brothers game, Monopoly, as intentionally planted clues. At the end, McGarrett gives Filer a Monopoly card reading "Go Directly to Jail... Do Not Pass Go... Do Not Collect $200". Note: Parker Brothers gave Hawaii Five-O permission to use Monopoly game cards in this episode. A sequel to this episode is "Odd Man In" (season 4, episode 14), where the brilliant Filer again matches wits with McGarrett.
61	12	"Beautiful Screamer"	Tony Leader	Stephen Kandel	December 2, 1970	1729-0313
A strangler (Lloyd Bochner) writes poetry by Byron in lipstick on the legs of two victims, one of whom (Anne Archer) was Danno's fiancée.
62	13	"The Payoff"	John Llewellyn Moxey	Ken Pettus	December 9, 1970	1729-0316
McGarrett must apprehend a hoodlum (Albert Salmi) and his girlfriend (Madlyn Rhue) who were part of a murderous kidnapping/abduction plot in order to save their lives from their co-conspirators whom they had double-crossed over ransom money. Guest stars Paul Carr; Joyce Van Patten.
63	14	"The Double Wall"	Michael O'Herlihy	Jerry Ludwig & Eric Bercovici	December 16, 1970	1729-0320
A convicted murderer doing life holds a prison doctor hostage and demands that McGarrett reopen his case claiming he is innocent. Monte Markham, William Schallert, Sorrell Booke guest stars.
64	15	"Paniolo"	Michael O'Herlihy	Ed Adamson	December 30, 1970	1729-0302
The death of a real estate agent leads McGarrett to a paniolo (a Hawaiian cowboy) on the island of Maui. Frank Silvera guest stars.
65	16	"Ten Thousand Diamonds and a Heart"	Paul Stanley	E. Arthur Kean	January 6, 1971	1729-0318
A prisoner is broken out of jail by a wealthy gangster so he can mastermind a $10 million robbery of the Honolulu Diamond Exchange. Tim O'Connor and Paul Stewart guest stars.
66	17	"To Kill or Be Killed"	Paul Stanley	Anthony Lawrence	January 13, 1971	1729-0312
Five-O meets resistance from Army intelligence after a highly decorated combat officer is found dead under mysterious circumstances and his draft dodging brother is a suspect.
67	18	"F.O.B. Honolulu"	Michael O'Herlihy	Eric Bercovici & Jerry Ludwig	January 27, 1971	1729-0321
68	19	"F.O.B. Honolulu"	Michael O'Herlihy	Eric Bercovici & Jerry Ludwig	February 3, 1971	1729-0321
Counterfeit plates for U.S. $20 bills are sought by various international agents – including Wo Fat – as Five-O must deal with murder, treason and double-cross. Joseph Sirola guest stars as "Jonathan Kaye". Roger C. Carmel guests stars as KGB agent "Misha the Bear".
69	20	"The Gunrunner"	Tony Leader	James D. Buchanan & Ronald Austin	February 10, 1971	1729-0317
A munitions dealer (Paul Burke) arranges for the kidnapping of his own wife so that he can induce a beleaguered government to pay a higher price for the arms shipment.
70	21	"Dear Enemy"	Murray Golden	Jackson Gillis	February 17, 1971	1729-0319
A woman (Vera Miles) manufactures evidence and consistently lies concerning two murders in an attempt to trick McGarrett into re-opening a homicide case for which her husband (John Lupton) was falsely convicted. Gary Collins also guest stars as the woman's lawyer, and local television personality/pitchman David "Lippy" Espinda appears as the bartender.
71	22	"The Bomber and Mrs. Moroney"	Paul Stanley	Jerry Ludwig & Eric Bercovici	February 24, 1971	1729-0315
While McGarrett is away in Chicago, an armed lunatic, released on parole from prison, plays Five-O and HPD for incompetent saps. The felon blames Danno for his brother's death (as portrayed in "...And They Painted Daisies On His Coffin", season 1, episode 6) and takes Chin Ho and three others hostage at Five-O headquarters and threatens to blow up the building.
72	23	"The Grandstand Play"	Paul Stanley	Adrian Spies	March 3, 1971	1729-0305
73	24	"The Grandstand Play"	Paul Stanley	T : Eric Bercovici & Jerry Ludwig; S/T : Adrian Spies	March 10, 1971	1729-0305
Part 1: The autistic son (Elliott Street) of a professional ball player (Pernell Roberts) witnesses a murder at the ballpark, but he is reluctant to tell his father or the authorities. This episode features footage from an actual Hawaii Islanders game and cameos from Hawaiian personalities Tim Tindall (as the tennis instructor), Les Keiter (as the baseball announcer), and George "Granny Goose" Groves (as a building landlord). Part 2: While Chin Ho and Danno interview local private detectives, McGarrett races against time to track down the ball player's son before the real killer (who saw his face in the newspaper) can identify him.
