= Hawaii Five-O (1968 TV series) =

American police procedural drama series

- Genre: Police procedural
- Created by: Leonard Freeman
- Starring: Jack Lord; James MacArthur; Kam Fong; Zulu; Al Harrington; Al Eben; Doug Mossman; Herman Wedemeyer; William Smith; Sharon Farrell; Moe Keale
- Theme music composer: Morton Stevens
- Opening theme: "Hawaii Five-O Theme" by Morton Stevens
- Ending theme: Same as above
- Composers: Bruce Broughton; John Cacavas; James Di Pasquale; Harry Geller; Ernest Gold; Les Hooper; Jerrold Immel; Mundell Lowe; Don B. Ray; George Romanis; Pete Rugolo; Walter Scharf; Richard Shores; Fred Steiner; Morton Stevens
- Country of origin: United States
- Original language: English
- No. of seasons: 12
- No. of episodes: 282 (list of episodes)

Production
- Executive producers: Leonard Freeman; Philip Leacock; Leonard Katzman; Bill Finnegan
- Production locations: Honolulu, Hawaii
- Running time: 42–49 minutes
- Production companies: Leonard Freeman Productions; CBS Productions

Original release
- Network: CBS
- Release: September 20, 1968 – April 5, 1980

Related
- Hawaii Five-0 (2010 series)

Hawaii Five-O is an American police procedural drama series produced by CBS Productions and created by Leonard Freeman. Set in Hawaii, the show aired for 12 seasons on CBS from September 20, 1968, to April 5, 1980. The show starred Jack Lord as Detective Captain Stephen "Steve" McGarrett, the head of a fictional state police task force in Hawaii. The theme music composed by Morton Stevens became especially popular. Many episodes in the series would end with McGarrett's catchphrase, "Book 'em, Danno!"

At the airing of its finale, it was the longest-running police drama in American television history, and the last scripted primetime show that debuted in the 1960s to leave the air. (Note: Marcus Welby, MD and Medical Center were the only other scripted primetime shows from the 1960s that lasted until the 1975–1976 season, after which both ended; for its last four seasons, Hawaii Five-O was the only 1960s show still in production.)

== Overview ==
The CBS television network produced Hawaii Five-O, which aired from September 20, 1968, to April 5, 1980. The program continues to be broadcast in syndication worldwide. Created by Leonard Freeman, Hawaii Five-O was shot on location in Honolulu, Hawaiʻi, and throughout the island of Oʻahu and elsewhere in the Hawaiian Islands with occasional filming in locales such as Los Angeles, Singapore, and Hong Kong.

The show centers on an elite fictional state police unit led by former U.S. Naval officer Steve McGarrett (played by Jack Lord), a detective captain, appointed by the Governor, Paul Jameson. In the show, McGarrett oversees state police officers — the young Danny "Danno" Williams, veteran Chin Ho Kelly (Kam Fong Chun), and streetwise Kono Kalakaua for seasons one through four. Honolulu Police Department Officer Duke Lukela joined the team as a regular, as did Ben Kokua, who replaced Kono beginning with season five. Occasionally, McGarrett's Five-O team is assisted by other officers as needed: Det. Frank Kamana (Douglas Mossman), P.O. Sandi Wells (Amanda McBroom), medical examiner Doc Bergman (Al Eben), forensic specialist Che Fong (Harry Endo), and a secretary.

The title of the show refers to Hawaiʻi's status as the fiftieth U.S. state. At the time of the show's premiere, Hawaiʻi had been a state for nine years. The Five-O team consists of three to five members (small for a real state police unit), and is depicted as occupying a suite of offices at the ʻIolani Palace. Five-O lacks its own radio network, necessitating frequent requests by McGarrett to the Honolulu Police Department dispatchers.

For 12 seasons, McGarrett and his team pursued international secret agents, criminals, and organized crime syndicates plaguing the Hawaiian Islands. With the aid of District Attorney and later Hawaii Attorney General John Manicote, McGarrett is successful in sending most of his enemies to prison. One such crime syndicate, introduced in the fifth season, was led by the Vashon family, portrayed by Luther Adler and Harold Gould. Other criminals and organized crime bosses on the islands were played by actors such as Ross Martin, Gavin MacLeod, and Ricardo Montalbán.

By the 12th and final season, series regular James MacArthur had left the show (in 1996, he admitted that he had become tired of the role and wanted to do other things), as had Kam Fong. Unlike other characters before him, Fong's character, Chin Ho Kelly, at Fong's request, was killed off, murdered while working undercover to expose a protection ring in Chinatown in the last episode of season 10. New characters Jim "Kimo" Carew (William Smith), Lori Wilson (Sharon Farrell), and Truck (Moe Keale) were introduced in season 12 alongside returning regular character Duke Lukela.

Most episodes of Hawaii Five-O ended with the arrest of criminals and McGarrett snapping, "Book 'em." The offense occasionally was added after this phrase, for example, "Book 'em, murder one." In many episodes, this was directed to Danny "Danno" Williams and became McGarrett's catchphrase: "Book 'em, Danno." This catchphrase also expanded to sports in the mid-1970s with former Pittsburgh Penguins announcer Mike Lange, who would utter the line for some Penguins goals.

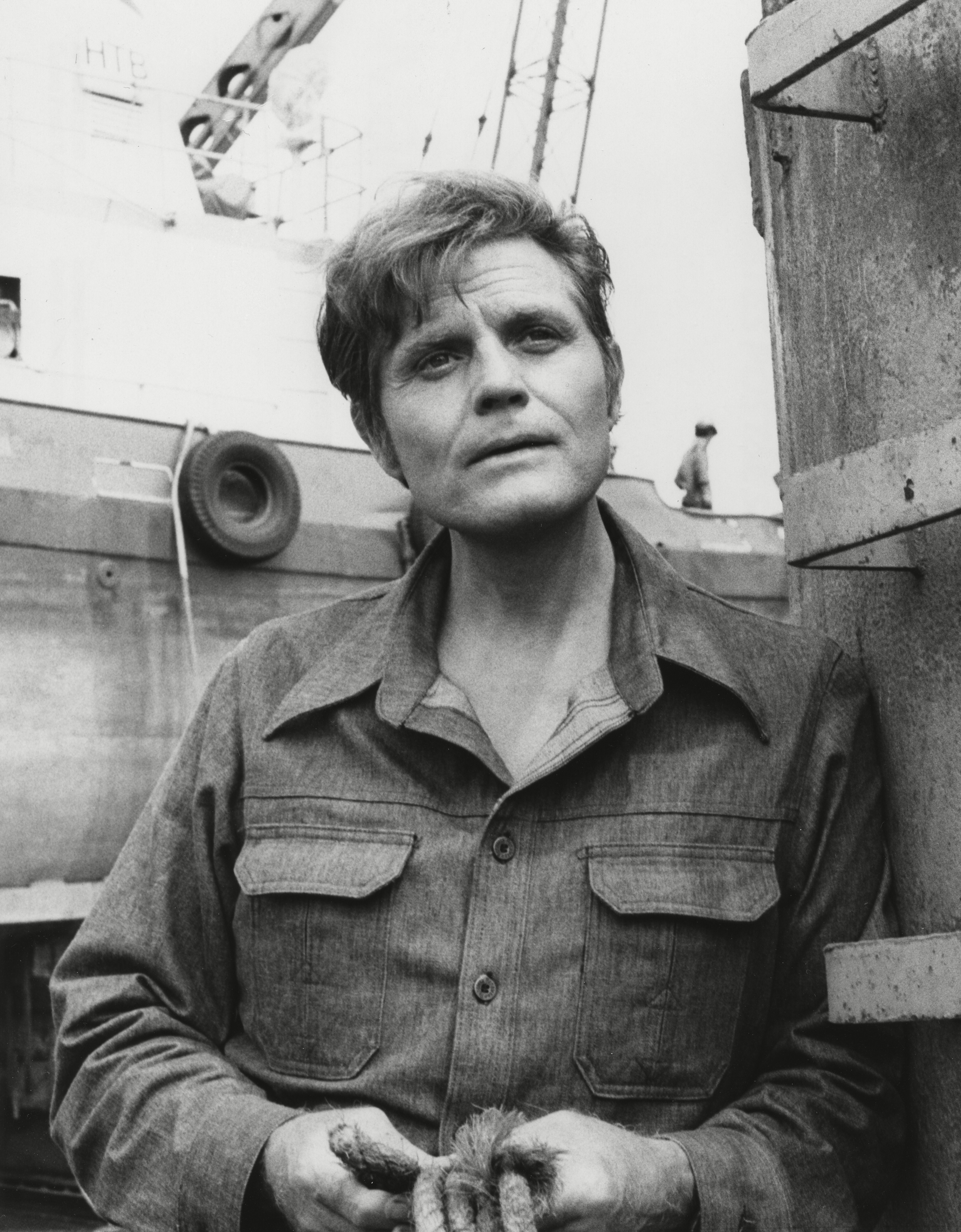
Jack Lord played Steve McGarrett.

McGarrett's tousled yet immaculate hairstyle, as well as his proclivity for wearing a dark suit and tie on all possible occasions (uncommon in the islands), rapidly entered popular culture. While the other members of Five-O "dressed mainland" much of the time, they also often wore local styles, such as the ubiquitous aloha shirt.

In many episodes (including the pilot), McGarrett is drawn into the world of international espionage and national intelligence. McGarrett's nemesis is a rogue intelligence officer of the People's Republic of China named Wo Fat. The communist rogue agent was played by veteran actor Khigh Dhiegh. In the show's final episode in 1980, titled "Woe to Wo Fat", McGarrett finally sees his foe go to jail.

Unlike the reboot, the show's action and straightforward storytelling left little time for personal stories involving wives or girlfriends, though a two-part story in the first season dealt with the loss of McGarrett's sister's baby. Occasionally, a show would flash back to McGarrett's younger years or to a romantic figure.

In the episode "Number One with a Bullet, Part 2", McGarrett tells a criminal, "It was a bastard like you who killed my father." His 42-year-old father had been run down and killed by someone who had just held up a supermarket. Because Steve McGarrett is also a commander in the Naval Reserve, he sometimes uses their resources to help investigate and solve crimes. The United States Navy, as well as the U.S. Coast Guard, provided some locations and resources for filming, hence the closing credits of some episodes acknowledge the assistance of the United States Navy. A 1975 episode involving Danno's aunt, played by MacArthur's mother Helen Hayes, provided a bit of Williams' back story.

== Creation of the show ==
Sources differ on how the show came to be. Producer Leonard Freeman moved to Hawaiʻi to recuperate after suffering a heart attack. One source states the idea for the show may have come from a conversation Freeman had with Hawaiʻi's then-Governor John A. Burns.

Another source instead claims that Freeman wanted to set a show in San Pedro, Los Angeles, California until his friend Richard Boone convinced him to shoot it entirely in Hawaiʻi. A third source claims Freeman discussed the show with Governor Burns only after pitching the idea to CBS. Before settling on the name "Hawaii Five-O", Freeman considered titling the show "The Man".

=== Casting ===
Kam Fong Chun played Chin Ho Kelly.

Freeman offered Richard Boone the part of McGarrett, but Boone turned it down; Gregory Peck and Robert Brown were also considered. Ultimately, Jack Lord – then living in Beverly Hills – was asked at the last moment. Lord read for the part on a Wednesday, was cast, and flew to Hawaiʻi two days later. On the following Monday, Lord was in front of the cameras. Freeman and Lord had worked together previously on an unsold TV pilot called Grand Hotel.

Tim O'Kelly originated the role of Danny "Danno" Williams in the pilot episode, "Cocoon". Test audiences apparently were not positive on O'Kelly, however, and the producers replaced him with James MacArthur.

Kam Fong Chun, an 18-year veteran of the Honolulu Police Department, auditioned for the part of the lead villain Wo Fat, but Freeman cast him in the part of Chin Ho Kelly instead. Freeman took the name Wo Fat from a restaurant in downtown Honolulu. The name Chin Ho came from Chinn Ho, the owner of the Ilikai Hotel where the penthouse shot of Steve McGarrett in the opening title sequence was taken. Richard Denning, who played the governor, had retired to Hawaiʻi and came out of retirement for the show. Zulu was a Waikīkī beach boy and local DJ with no acting experience when he was cast for the part of Kono, which he played for the next four years.

== Characters ==
Character	Actor	Job	Seasons											
Character	Actor	Job	1	2	3	4	5	6	7	8	9	10	11	12
Steve McGarrett	Jack Lord	Commander, Five-O Task Force	Main	Main	Main	Main	Main	Main	Main	Main	Main	Main	Main	Main
Danny "Danno" Williams	James MacArthur	Detective Sergeant, Five-O Task Force; Lieutenant Five-O Task Force	Main	Main	Main	Main	Main	Main	Main	Main	Main	Main	Main	
Chin Ho Kelly	Kam Fong Chun	Detective, Five-O Task Force	Main	Main	Main	Main	Main	Main	Main	Main	Main	Main		
Kono Kalakaua	Zulu	Detective, Five-O Task Force	Main	Main	Main	Main								
Paul Jameson	Richard Denning	Governor	Main	Main	Main	Main	Main	Main	Main	Main	Main	Main	Main	Main
May	Maggi Parker	Secretary	Main											
Jenny Sherman	Peggy Ryan	Secretary		Main	Main	Main	Main	Main	Main	Main				
John Manicote	Glenn Cannon	Attorney General				Main	Main	Main	Main	Main	Main			
Edward "Duke" Lukela	Herman Wedemeyer	Sergeant, HPD; Detective, Five-O Task Force					Main	Main	Main	Main	Main	Main	Main	Main
Nick Kellog	Danny Kamekona	Sergeant, HPD; Sergeant, Five-O Task Force					Main	Main	Main					Main
Ben Kokua	Al Harrington	Detective					Main	Main	Main					
Doc Bergman	Al Eben	Medical examiner				Main	Main	Main	Main	Main	Main	Main	Main	Main
Frank Kamana	Douglas Mossman	Detective							Main					
James "Kimo" Carew	William Smith	Detective												Main
Lori Wilson	Sharon Farrell	Detective												Main
Moe "Truck" Kealoha	Moe Keale	Detective, HPD												Main

=== Recurring ===
- Wo Fat (Khigh Dhiegh), a Chinese intelligence agent and criminal mastermind
- Che Fong (Edward Tom, season 1; Danny Kamekona, seasons 1–2; Harry Endo, seasons 2–10) the HPD forensic specialist
- Joey Lee (Brian Tochi), former gang leader turned undercover informant for McGarrett
- Lieutenant George Kealoha (Douglas Mossman), HPD (season 1)
- Jonathan Kaye (James Gregory, pilot; Joseph Sirola, season 2–5; Robert Dixon, "To Kill or Be Killed", season 3; Tim O'Connor, "The Ninety-Second War", season 4; Bill Edwards, seasons 5–10; and Lyle Bettger, season 10) from the U. S. State Department
- "Doc" (full name never used—Newell Tarrant, season 1; Robert Brilliande, season 2; Ted Thorpe, season 2; Robert Costa, season 3) HPD medical examiner (or coroner)
- Attorney General Walter Stewart (Morgan White, season 1)
- May (Mitzi Hoag, pilot; Maggi Parker, season 1), McGarrett's secretary
- Jenny Sherman (Peggy Ryan), McGarrett's secretary (seasons 2–8)
- Luana (Laura Sode), McGarrett's secretary (seasons 11–12)
- Dr. Grant Ormsbee (Pat Hingle), a scientist (seasons 8 & 9)
- Dr. Bishop (Jean Tarrant), criminal psychologist (season 6). Tarrant also guest starred in two non-recurring character roles, one in season 8 and one in season 9.

=== Pilot cast ===
- Danny "Danno" Williams, Detective Sgt. – Tim O'Kelly
- Paul Jameson, Governor – Lew Ayres
- May, secretary – Mitzi Hoag

== Production ==
The first season was shot in a rusty military Quonset hut in Pearl City, which the various cast members quickly nicknamed "Mongoose Manor". The roof tended to leak, and rats would often gnaw at the cables. The show then moved to a Fort Ruger location for seasons two to eight. A third studio was built at Diamond Head, and was used during the last four seasons.

A problem from the beginning was the lack of a movie industry in Hawaiʻi. Much of the crew and cast, including many locals who ended up participating in the show, had to learn their respective jobs as they went along. Jack Lord was known as a perfectionist who insisted on the best from everyone. His temper flared when he felt that others did not give their best, but in later reunions they admitted that Lord's hard-driving force had made them better actors and made Hawaii Five-O a better show. Lord's high standards helped the show last another six years after Leonard Freeman's death from heart trouble during the sixth season.

Lord said the show discarded more scripts than any show on television. He would not tolerate or shoot any scripts that he deemed subpar.

Most episodes had McGarrett leading the investigations but occasionally, episodes would focus on the other actors, and let them showcase their own talents, such as Danno defusing bombs in "The Clock Struck Twelve".

Very few episodes were shot outside of Hawaiʻi. At least two episodes were shot on location in Los Angeles, one in Hong Kong, and one in Singapore as McGarrett traveled to those locales for Investigations.

Each episode was shot in seven days, and in 1975 the cost of shooting each episode was $290,000. At the time it was the most expensive show on the air.

== Credits ==
The opening title sequence was created by television director Reza S. Badiyi. Early shows began with a cold open suggesting the sinister plot for that episode, then cut to a shot of a big ocean wave and the start of the theme song. A fast zoom-in to the top balcony of the Ilikai Hotel followed, showing McGarrett turning to face the camera, followed by many quick-cuts and freeze-frames of Hawaiian scenery, including Punchbowl Cemetery, and Hawaiian-Chinese-English model Elizabeth Malamalamaokalani Logue turning to face the camera. A grass-skirted hula dancer from the pilot episode was also included, played by Helen Kuoha-Torco, who later became a business professor at Windward Community College. The opening scene ended with shots of the supporting players, and the flashing blue light of a police motorcycle racing through a Honolulu street.

At the conclusion of each episode, Jack Lord narrated a promo for the next episode, often emphasizing the "guest villain", especially if the villain is a recurring character, such as that played by actor Hume Cronyn (2 episodes). The line he spoke was, "This is Jack Lord inviting you to be with us next week for <name of episode>" and then, "Be here. Aloha." The promos were removed from the syndicated episodes but most have been restored in DVD releases from the second season through the ninth. Most of the promos are slightly edited to remove references to "next week".

This tradition has been continued in the 2010 version of Hawaii Five-0, but is not limited to Alex O'Loughlin. All of the primary cast members take turns with the "Be here. Aloha." line at the end of the preview segment.

There were two versions of the closing credits portion of the show. During the first season, the theme music was played over a short film of a flashing blue light attached to the rear of a police motorcycle in Waikīkī heading west (the film is shown at twice the normal speed, as can be seen from people crossing a street behind the police motorcycle). In later seasons, the same music was played over film of outrigger canoeists battling the surf.

In a 2010 issue of TV Guide, the show's opening title sequence ranked No. 4 on a list of TV's top 10 credits sequences, as selected by readers.

== Legacy ==
The show was the longest-running police procedural show on American television until Law & Order surpassed it in 2002, and was the first to enjoy an uninterrupted run that exceeded a decade (it has since been joined in that distinction by several other series including Law & Order: Special Victims Unit, CSI: Crime Scene Investigation and NCIS).

When the show premiered in 1968, Hawaiʻi had been a state for only nine years and was relatively obscure to Americans who had never served in the Pacific Theater, but as a geographic part of Polynesia it had an exotic image.

Known for the location, theme song, and ensemble cast, Hawaii Five-O contains a heavy use of exterior location shooting throughout the entire 12 seasons. A typical episode, on average, would have at least two-thirds of all footage shot on location, as opposed to a "typical" show of the time which would be shot largely on sound stages and backlots. It is also remembered for its unusual setting during a time when most crime dramas of the era were set in or around the Los Angeles or New York City areas.

The Hawaii-based television show Magnum, P.I. was created after Hawaii Five-O ended its run, in order to make further use of the expensive production facilities created there for Five-O. The first few Magnum P.I. episodes made direct references to Five-O, suggesting that it takes place in the same fictional setting. In Episode 10 of Season 2, "The Taking of Dick McWilliams," Rick Wright answers Thomas Magnum when asked about a license plate search that the car belonged to someone on Five-O named McGarrett. Magnum's producers made a few attempts to coax Jack Lord out of retirement for a cameo appearance, but he refused.

Many local people were cast in the show, which was ethnically diverse by the standards of the late 1960s. The first run and syndication were seen by an estimated 400 million people around the world.

"Bored, She Hung Herself", the 16th episode of the second season, depicted a Five-O investigation into the apparent suicide of a woman by hanging, which she was supposedly practicing as part of a health regimen. A viewer reportedly died trying the same technique, and as a result, the episode was not rebroadcast, was never included in any syndication packages, and has not been included on any DVD release of the show to date. The family of the person who died in the real-life hanging sued CBS over the episode.

=== Remake projects ===
==== 1990s ====
In July 1996, it was announced producer George Litto had partnered with Leonard Freeman's estate and his widow, Rose, in developing a theatrical adaptation of Hawaii Five-O with a $50 million-$70 million budget and franchise potential. For the lead role of Steve McGarrett, Litto expressed a desire for Mel Gibson, Michael Douglas or Harrison Ford while former McGarrett actor Jack Lord would play a Governor or Senator from Hawaii. Directors whom Litto expressed interest in helming the project included Andrew Davis, Brian De Palma, and Paul Verhoeven. Development on a feature film was stonewalled when CBS filed suit against the Freeman estate claiming ownership and usage of Hawaii Five-O rested with them and not the Freemans. The suit was eventually settled in favor of Freeman and Litto.

A one-hour pilot for a new series was made in 1996 but never aired. Produced and written by Stephen J. Cannell, it starred Gary Busey and Russell Wong as the new Five-O team. James MacArthur returned as Dan Williams, having become governor of Hawaii. Several cameos were made by other Five-O regulars, including Kam Fong as Chin Ho Kelly (even though the character had been killed off at the end of Season 10).

==== DreamWorks ====
In April 2002, Another attempt was made by Litto to turn Hawaii Five-O into a feature film with a film package he put together, that included a script by Roger Towne and an expected budget of $100 million, becoming the subject of a bidding war among several studios until DreamWorks Pictures emerged with exclusive negotiating rights. Later that same month however, Dreamworks lost their position as exclusive negotiator after the studio was unwilling to meet Litto's condition that would have given him and his heirs in-perpetuity creative control over Hawaii Five-O in a manner similar to the Broccoli family's control over the James Bond films. Litto expressed no regret at the deal with DreamWorks collapsing and stated:

...this was more about the reluctance to give up rights if the studio put up all the money. I've been involved in the series since its inception and have never rushed to remake this. What mattered to me was this: What is the script? Who plays McGarrett? And who directs? I wouldn’t waive my rights to be part of those decisions, because I believe if the first is done right, it has the franchise potential of James Bond or Mission: Impossible. Do it wrong the first time and it's over.

==== Hawaii Five-0 ====
A remake pilot, called Hawaii Five-0 (the last character is a zero instead of the letter "O"; the original series used an "O" as zero was typed as a capital O), aired September 20, 2010, on CBS. It lasted for 10 seasons until the 240th and final episode was aired on April 3, 2020. The remake version Hawaii Five-0 used the same principal character names as the original, and the new Steve McGarrett's late father's vintage 1974 Mercury Marquis was the actual car driven by Lord in the original series' final seasons.

The new series opening credit sequence was an homage to the original; the theme song was cut in half, from 60 to 30 seconds, but was an otherwise identical instrumentation. Most of the iconic shots were replicated, beginning with the helicopter approach and close-up turn of McGarrett at the Ilikai Hotel penthouse, the jet engine nacelle, a hula dancer's hips, the quickly stepped zoom-in to the face of the Lady Columbia statue at Punchbowl, the close-up of the Kamehameha Statue's face, and the ending with a police motorcycle's flashing blue light.

The surname of recurring character Governor Sam Denning (played by Richard T. Jones) was a nod to actor Richard Denning, who played the Governor in the original series. Starting with Season 7, many of the clips that were part of the original opening were removed and more action shots of the cast were included. On the March 19, 2012 episode, Ed Asner reprised his role as "August March", a character he first played in a 1975 episode. Clips from the 1975 episode were included in the new one, even though the 2010 series was intended to be in a different narrative universe than the Jack Lord series. The 2016 episode "Makaukau ʻoe e Paʻani?" features a sequence in which McGarrett (played by Alex O'Loughlin) briefly interacts with a CGI reconstruction of Jack Lord.

==== Future ====
In September 2026, a movie was announced to be in development, with Destin Daniel Cretton directing from a script by Chris Bremner and Noah Oppenheim.

=== Theme music ===
Another legacy of the show is the popularity of the Hawaii Five-O theme music. The tune was composed by Morton Stevens, who also composed numerous episode scores performed by the CBS Orchestra. The theme was later recorded by the Ventures, whose version reached No. 4 on the Billboard Hot 100 pop chart, and is particularly popular with college and high school marching bands, especially at the University of Hawaiʻi where it has become the unofficial fight song. Fans mimic swimming during the playing of the song.

The tune has also been heard at Robertson Stadium after Houston Dynamo goals scored by Brian Ching, a native of Hawaii. Because of the tempo of the music, the theme gained popularity in the UK with followers of Northern soul and was popular on dance floors in the 1970s.

=== Slang term for police ===
The phrase "five-O" (or any variation, such as "5–0", "5-O", and "five O") /ˈfaɪv oʊ/ FYVE oh) has often come to refer to the police in the United States.

== Episodes ==
Season	Episodes	Originally released		Rank	Rating
Season	Episodes	First released	Last released	Rank	Rating
1	24	September 20, 1968	March 19, 1969	46	18.1
2	25	September 24, 1969	March 11, 1970	19	21.1
3	24	September 16, 1970	March 10, 1971	7	25.0
4	24	September 14, 1971	March 7, 1972	12	23.6
5	24	September 12, 1972	March 13, 1973	3	25.2
6	24	September 11, 1973	February 26, 1974	5	24.0
7	24	September 10, 1974	March 25, 1975	10	24.8
8	24	September 12, 1975	March 4, 1976	39	N/A
9	24	September 30, 1976	May 5, 1977	18	21.9 (Note: Tied with 60 Minutes)
10	24	September 15, 1977	May 4, 1978	23	20.4
11	22	September 28, 1978	April 5, 1979	44	18.0
12	19	October 4, 1979	April 5, 1980	47	—N/a

== Broadcast history ==
- September 1968 – December 1968: Thursdays at 8:00 p.m.
- December 1968 – March 1971: Wednesdays at 10:00 p.m.
- September 1971 – February 1974: Tuesdays at 8:30 p.m.
- September 1974 – March 1975: Tuesdays at 9:00 p.m.
- September 1975 – November 1975: Fridays at 9:00 p.m.
- December 1975 – November 1979: Thursdays at 9:00 p.m.
- December 1979 – January 1980: Tuesdays at 9:00 p.m.
- March 1980 – April 1980: Saturdays at 9:00 p.m.

=== Syndication ===
Hawaii Five-O survived long enough to overlap with reruns of early episodes, which were broadcast by CBS in their late night schedule while new episodes were still being produced. Once the program entered syndication after the original run of the series, CBS broadcast reruns of season 12 in late night under the title McGarrett to avoid confusion with the episodes in syndication broadcast under the title Hawaii Five-O. In the United Kingdom, the series first aired on ITV on July 19, 1970, in a Saturday evening time slot.

In Hawaii, reruns of the series aired on 13 Alanui beginning on August 1, 2001 (the day 13 Alanui began broadcasting) and continued until December 30, 2011.

From September 2021 to mid October 2023, the series aired in Ontario, Canada intermittently weekdays either at 1pm or 2pm on CHCH TV 11. CHCH did air the HD remastered version of the series in its original unedited broadcast versions. CHCH did air all 12 seasons in broadcast order.

Since 2023, the first ten seasons stream three episodes per day on Pluto TV in Canada. Episodes are also remastered in HD and uncut.

Beginning in January 2022, Heroes & Icons picked up the show, and it ran until December 2025. As of 2026, it continues to air on H&I's sister networks, MeTV and MeTV+.

== Awards and nominations ==
=== Emmys ===
- Wins
  - 1970: Outstanding Music Composition - For a Series or a Single Program of a Series (In Its First Year Only): Morton Stevens, "A Thousand Pardons, You're Dead!"
  - 1974: Best Music Composition - For a Series, a Single Program of a Series : Morton Stevens, "Hookman"
- Nominations
  - 1969: Outstanding Cinematography: Frank Phillips, "Up-Tight"
  - 1969: Outstanding Musical Composition: Morton Stevens, the pilot
  - 1971: Outstanding Film Editing: Arthur David Hilton, "Over Fifty? Steal"
  - 1971: Outstanding Directing: Bob Sweeney, "Over Fifty? Steal"
  - 1972: Outstanding Cinematography: Robert L. Morrison
  - 1973: Outstanding Drama Series: Leonard Freeman, executive producer; Bob Sweeney, supervising producer; William Finnegan, producer
  - 1974: Best Cinematography: Robert Morrison, Jack Whitman and Bill Huffman
  - 1974: Best Music Composition – Series: Don B. Ray, "Nightmare in Blue"
  - 1974: Best Music Composition – Series: Bruce Broughton, "The $100,000 Nickel"
  - 1976: Outstanding Actress, Single Performance Drama or Comedy Series: Helen Hayes, "Retire in Sunny Hawaii ... Forever"

== Streaming media ==
CBS Interactive had presented the entire first season of the show online via Adobe Flash streaming media. As of July 2017, almost every episode is available at CBS.com. The first 10 episodes of season 1 are available free of charge. All other episodes require a CBS All Access subscription to view. As of 2025, the series is available on Paramount+.

== Home media ==
CBS DVD (distributed by Paramount) has released all twelve seasons on DVD in Region 1. The first eight seasons have been released in region 2 and the first seven seasons in region 4.

In September 2019 (Region 4, Australia), Via Vision Entertainment released a Season 1-7 Boxset followed by Season 8-12 Boxset in February 2020. The Via Vision Entertainment releases are only available in these box sets and not individual seasons.

The episode "Bored, She Hung Herself" is not included in The Second Season set. The omission is mentioned on the back of the box. Only some Australian bootlegs have had the episode. Seasons 2–8 contain episode promos by Jack Lord.

On December 3, 2013, Paramount released Hawaii Five-O – The Complete Series on DVD in Region 1. On April 18, 2017, The Complete Series set was reissued.

Hawaii Five-O releases available on DVD, with regional release dates
DVD name	No. eps.	Release dates		
DVD name	No. eps.	Region 1	Region 2	Region 4
The First Season	24	March 6, 2007	April 16, 2007	April 12, 2007
The Second Season	24	July 31, 2007	October 29, 2007	November 8, 2007
The Third Season	24	January 22, 2008	May 5, 2008	May 15, 2008
The Fourth Season	24	June 10, 2008	September 1, 2008	November 6, 2008
The Fifth Season	24	November 18, 2008	February 9, 2009	March 5, 2009
The Sixth Season	24	April 21, 2009	September 14, 2009	December 24, 2009
The Seventh Season	24	October 20, 2009	March 22, 2010	December 24, 2009
The Eighth Season	23	March 16, 2010	December 7, 2020	February 12, 2020
The Ninth Season	23	August 3, 2010	TBA	February 12, 2020
The Tenth Season	24	December 14, 2010	TBA	February 12, 2020
The Eleventh Season	21	September 20, 2011	TBA	February 12, 2020
The Twelfth and Final Season	19	January 10, 2012	TBA	February 12, 2020
The Complete Series	278	December 3, 2013	TBA	TBA
The Complete Series	278	April 18, 2017	TBA	TBA
Seasons 1-7	278	TBA	TBA	September 4, 2019
Seasons 8-12	278	TBA	TBA	February 12, 2020

== Other media ==
A soundtrack album featuring Morton Stevens' theme and incidental music from the pilot and the first two seasons was issued by Capitol Records in 1970. Unlike many albums of television music of the time, the music was taken directly from the scoring sessions rather than being specially re-recorded for album release. One of the instrumental pieces on the album, "Call to Danger", was originally recorded for the unsold 1967 pilot of the same name and also excerpted as background music accompanying a "Special Presentation" logo that CBS used to introduce its prime time television specials throughout the 1970s and 1980s. The album was re-issued on compact disc by Film Score Monthly in 2010.

1. "Hawaii Five-0" (1:32)
2. "Call to Danger" (1:48)
3. "McGarrett's Theme" (2:25)
4. "Front Street" (2:42)
5. "The Long Wait" (2:18)
6. "Blues Trip" (3:14)
7. "The Floater" (2:23)
8. "Interlude" (1:53)
9. "Operation Smash" (2:05)
10. "Beach Trip" (2:30)
11. "Up Tight" (2:05)
12. "The Chase/Hawaii Five-0" (4:36)

Hawaii Five-O was the subject of six original novels. The first two books were published by Signet Paperbacks in 1968 and 1969. After that were two juvenile hard covers published by Whitman publishing in 1969 and 1971 and finally two more books were published in England.

== See also ==
- Miami Vice
