= Leonard Freeman =

American television writer and producer (1920–1974)

- Born: October 31, 1920; Sonoma County, California
- Died: January 20, 1974 (aged 53); Palo Alto, California, U.S.
- Occupations: Television writer, producer, screenwriter
- Years active: 1952–1974
- Spouse: Joan Taylor (1953)
- Children: 3, including Lisa Freeman

Leonard Freeman (October 31, 1920 – January 20, 1974) was an American television writer and producer who is best remembered as the creator of the CBS series Hawaii Five-O in 1968. He appeared in a 1953 episode (#112) of the TV series The Lone Ranger.

Hawaii Five-O ran for twelve seasons, at the time a record for a crime drama. In 1960, he wrote for the series Route 66; in 1962, he produced The Untouchables. In 1967, he produced the western film, Hang 'Em High. A decade earlier, he wrote scripts for the syndicated Men of Annapolis.

Freeman died in 1974 during the sixth season of Hawaii Five-O of complications related to heart surgery.
