= Jack Lord =

American actor (1920–1998)

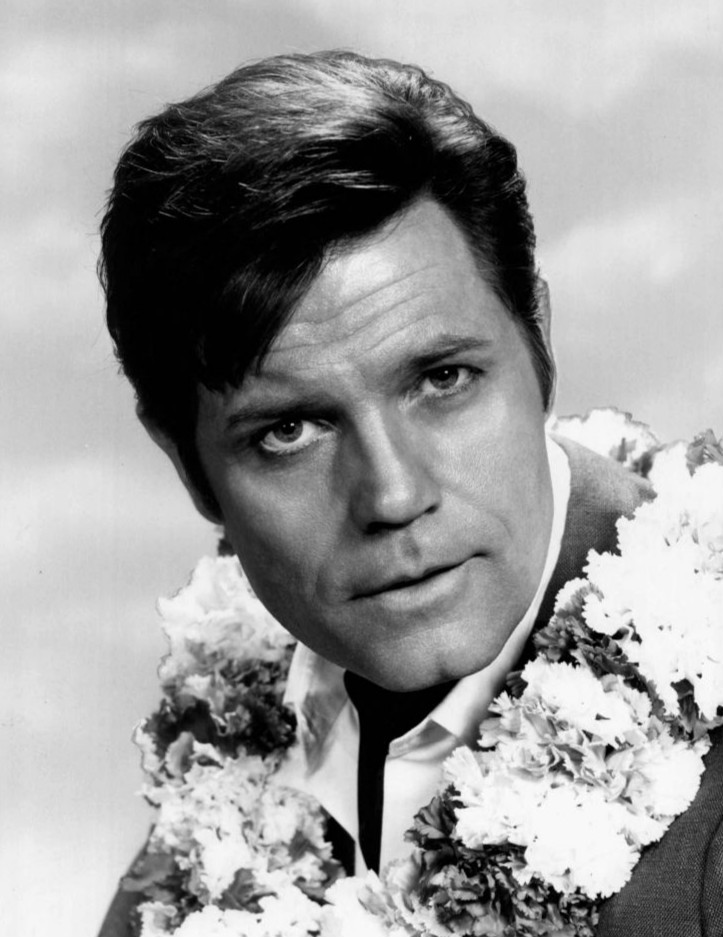
- Lord in 1968
- Born: John Joseph Patrick Ryan; December 30, 1920; New York City, U.S.
- Died: January 21, 1998 (aged 77); Honolulu, Hawaii, U.S
- Occupations: Artist; actor; director; producer
- Years active: 1949–1980
- Known for: Steve McGarrett in Hawaii Five-O
- Spouses: Ann Cicily Ward (m. 1942; div. 1947) Marie De Narde (m. 1949)
- Children: 1

John Joseph Patrick Ryan (December 30, 1920 – January 21, 1998), best known by his stage name, Jack Lord, was an American television, film and Broadway actor, director and producer. He starred as Steve McGarrett in the CBS television program Hawaii Five-O, which ran from 1968 to 1980.

== Early years ==
Born in the Bushwick section of Brooklyn, New York, Lord was the son of Irish-American parents. His father, William Lawrence Ryan, was a steamship company executive. He grew up in Richmond Hill, Queens, New York.

As a child, Lord developed equestrian skills on his mother's fruit farm in the Hudson River Valley. He started spending summers at sea, and from the decks of cargo ships painted and sketched the landscapes he encountered—Africa, the Mediterranean and China. He was educated at St. Benedict Joseph Labre School, John Adams High School, in Ozone Park, Queens, and the United States Merchant Marine Academy, then located at Fort Trumbull in New London, Connecticut, graduating as an Ensign with a Third Mate’s License. He attended New York University (NYU) on a football scholarship and earned a degree in Fine Arts.

Lord spent the first year of the United States' involvement in World War II with the United States Army Corps of Engineers, building bridges in Persia. He returned to the Merchant Marine as an able seaman before enrolling in the deck officer course at Fort Trumbull. While making maritime training films, Lord took to the idea of acting.

== Career ==
Lord received theatrical training from Sanford Meisner at the Neighborhood Playhouse. He worked as a car salesman to fund his studies. Later he studied at the Actors Studio.

His Broadway debut was as Slim Murphy in Horton Foote's The Traveling Lady with Kim Stanley in 1954. The show ran for 30 performances, but Lord won the Theatre World Award for his performance. Lord was then cast as Brick as a replacement for Ben Gazzara in the 1955–1956 production of Cat on a Hot Tin Roof.

Lord's first commercial movie was the propaganda film Project X. He rose to associate producer on Cry Murder. In 1957, Lord starred in Williamsburg: the Story of a Patriot, which has run daily at Colonial Williamsburg since then. In 1958, Lord co-starred in God's Little Acre, the film adaptation of Erskine Caldwell's 1933 novel.

Lord was the first actor to play the character Felix Leiter in the James Bond film series, introduced in 1962 in Dr. No. Lord demanded co-star billing, a bigger role, and more money to continue in the part. This led to Guy Hamilton casting Cec Linder; thereafter, until David Hedison returned to the role in Licence to Kill, Leiter was played by a different actor in each film.

In 1962, Lord starred as series namesake Stoney Burke, a rodeo cowboy from Mission Ridge, South Dakota. The basis for the series was real-life champion rodeo rider Casey Tibbs. The series featured Warren Oates and Bruce Dern in recurring supporting roles. Lord credited Gary Cooper as his on-screen role model and the inspiration for his characterization of Stoney Burke.

Lord was considered for Eliot Ness in The Untouchables before Robert Stack won the role. He did appear in the Season One episode "The Jake Lingle Killing." Among numerous guest roles on TV, he appeared on the first episode of Have Gun, Will Travel and co-starred in The Name of the Game Is Kill! in 1968.

According to William Shatner, in 1966, Gene Roddenberry offered Lord the role of Captain James T. Kirk on Star Trek to replace Jeffrey Hunter. Lord asked for 50 percent ownership of the show, so Roddenberry offered the role to Shatner.

=== Hawaii Five-O ===
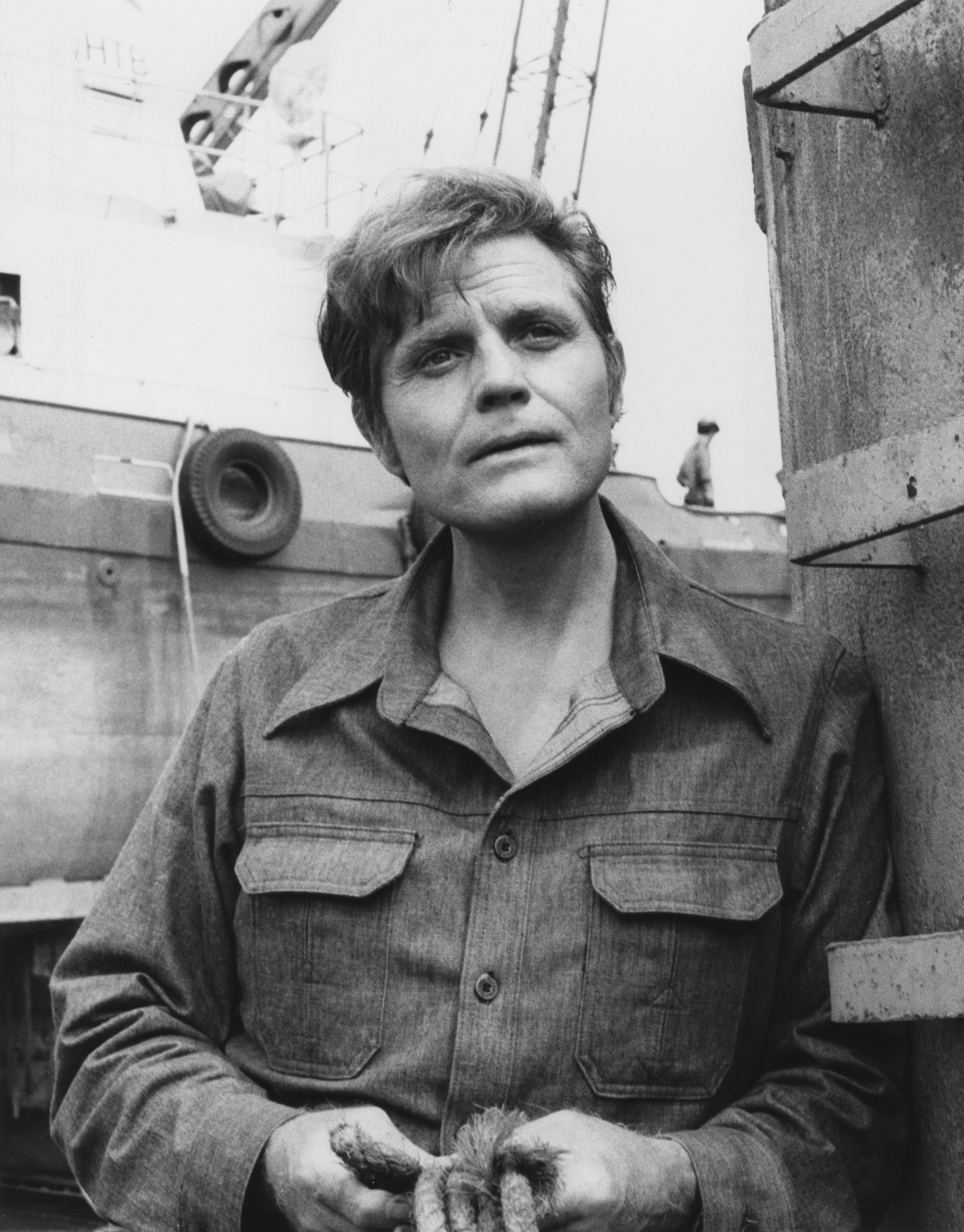
Lord in a 1977 publicity photo for Hawaii Five-O

Lord starred in Hawaii Five-O for its 12 seasons (1968 to 1980) as Detective Steve McGarrett, appointed by the governor to head the (fictional) State Police criminal investigation department in Honolulu, Hawaii. The opening sequence includes a shot of Lord standing on a penthouse balcony of the Ilikai hotel. Chin Ho Kelly, the name of the police detective played by Kam Fong, was a tip-of-the-hat to Ilikai developer Chinn Ho. Lord's catchphrase “Book 'em, Danno!" became a part of pop culture. In the original run of the series (but not in syndication), at the end of each episode would be a promo: "This is Jack Lord inviting you to be with us next week for (name of episode). Be here. Aloha!" He was instrumental in the casting of native Hawaiians, instead of mainland actors. Lord insisted his character drive Ford vehicles; McGarrett drove a 1967 Mercury Park Lane in the pilot, a 1968 Park Lane from 1968 to 1974, and a 1974 Mercury Marquis for the remainder of the series (this very car was shown in the 2010 remake).

When series creator Leonard Freeman died in 1974, the show's ownership was shared among Lord, CBS, and Freeman's estate, with a contract that made Lord executive producer and gave him complete control over content. He was a hands-on partner who paid attention to minute details and was known for battles with network executives.

The seventh season premiere of the rebooted Hawaii Five-0 featured an appearance that featured the old and new versions of Steve McGarrett, made possible through CGI. To execute this concept, permission was first secured from Lord's estate, managed by a bank that required a script review. With the estate's approval, work began. Counter Punch Studios created a CG version of Jack Lord's face, working with Picture Shop visual effects to add realistic skin textures based on images from Lord's final season in the original series.

Cinematographers sometimes refer to a 50mm lens ("5-0") as a "Jack Lord" in reference to the name of the show that made him famous.

== Artist ==
During his years at NYU, Lord and his brother Bill opened the Village Academy of Arts. Jack's childhood dream was to become an artist. His first professional sale was in 1941 to the Metropolitan Museum of Art for his two linoleum cuts, entitled Vermont and Fishing Shacks, Block Island.

== Personal life ==
In 1942, Lord married his first wife, Ann Willard. They divorced in 1947. Their union produced a son, but Lord only saw him once when the boy was an infant. On August 24, 1955, his son died, aged 12 years, following a brief battle with hepatitis (he is buried in Fairfield County, Connecticut [state file number 14006]). Lord only learned of his son's death after receiving a copy of his death certificate from his son's mother. Ann Willard Ryan remarried in the 1950s and died on December 30, 2004.

Lord met his second wife while house hunting in upstate New York. On January 17, 1949, Lord married fashion designer Marie de Narde (1905–2005), a job she gave up to devote her time to him and his career. Until 1957, the couple lived near the Lescaze House on East 48th Street in New York before moving to California.

== Death ==
After Hawaii Five-O ended its run in 1980, Lord kept a low profile and was rarely seen in public. His final TV appearance was that same year in a failed pilot for a new CBS series called M Station: Hawaii which he also directed (it had been filmed in early 1979, immediately before shooting the final season of Hawaii Five-O). Lord suffered from Alzheimer's disease for at least seven years before his death, although some accounts suggest he may have had Alzheimer's as early as the final season of Hawaii Five-O. He died of congestive heart failure at his home in Honolulu, on January 21, 1998, at the age of 77. He predeceased his Five-O co-star Richard Denning by nine months. Lord's $40 million estate went to Hawaiian charities upon his wife's death in 2005.

== Memorial ==
A bronze bust of Lord by Hawaii sculptor Lynn Weiler Liverton was unveiled in a ceremony at the Kahala Mall outside Macy's on June 19, 2004. The Lords lived in a condominium in the Kahala area, and they were known to frequent the neighborhood mall. The nonprofit Jack Lord Memorial Fund, which raised the money for the memorial, was co-chaired by British Hawaii Five-O fan Esperanza Isaac and Lord's co-star Doug Mossman.

== Filmography ==
Film
Year	Title	Role	Notes
1949	The Red Menace aka Project X	John Bates	
1950	Cry Murder	Tommy Warren	Associate producer
1950	The Tattooed Stranger	Det. Deke Del Vecchio	Uncredited
1955	The Court-Martial of Billy Mitchell	Lt. Cmdr. Zachary "Zack" Lansdowne	
1956	The Vagabond King	Ferrebouc	
1957	Tip on a Dead Jockey	Jimmy Heldon	
1957	Williamsburg: the Story of a Patriot	John Fry	
1958	The True Story of Lynn Stuart	Willie Down	
1958	God's Little Acre	Buck Walden	
1958	Man of the West	Coaley Tobin	
1959	The Hangman	Johnny Bishop	
1960	Walk Like a Dragon	Lincoln "Linc" Bartlett	
1962	Dr. No	Felix Leiter	
1967	The Ride to Hangman's Tree	Guy Russell	
1968	The Name of the Game Is Kill!	Symcha Lipa	
1968	The Counterfeit Killer	Don Owens	
1996	Jerry Maguire	Det. Capt. Steve McGarrett	Uncredited; Archive footage
2000	Screwed	Det. Capt. Steve McGarrett	Uncredited; Archive footage

Television
Year	Title	Role	Episode title/Notes
1952	The Hunter		"The Puzzle of Pier 90"
1953	Broadway Television Theatre		"Criminal at Large"
1953	You Are There		"The Birth of the National Anthem"
1953	Man Against Crime		"The Midnight Express"
1954	Tom Corbett, Space Cadet		"Rescue in Space"
1954	Man Against Crime		"The Chinese Dolls"
1954	The Web		"Grand Finale"
1954	Suspense		"String"
1954	Danger		"The Bouncer"
1955	Danger		"Season for Murder"
1955	Armstrong Circle Theatre		"Buckskin"
1955	Appointment with Adventure	Bill	"Five in Judgment
1955	The Elgin Hour	Lieutenant Davis	"Combat Medics"
1956	The Philco Television Playhouse		"This Land Is Mine"
1956	Omnibus		"One Nation"
1956	Westinghouse Studio One	Paul Chester	"An Incident of Love"
1956	Westinghouse Studio One	Matt	"A Day Before Battle"
1956	Lux Video Theatre	Buck	"Jezebel"
1956	Lux Video Theatre	Rudd Kendall	"Old Acquaintance"
1957	Conflict		"Pattern for Violence"
1957	Climax!	Charlie Mullaney	"Mr. Runyon of Broadway"
1957	Have Gun – Will Travel	Dave Enderby	"Three Bells to Perdido"
1957	Gunsmoke	Nat Brandel; Myles Brandel	"Doc's Reward"
1957	The Silent Service	Hurt	"The Loss of the Perch"
1957	Playhouse 90	Jim Kester	"The Lone Woman"
1958	Playhouse 90	Homer Aswell	"Reunion"
1958	U.S. Marshal	Matt Bonner	"Sentenced to Death"
1958	The Millionaire	Lee Randolph	"The Lee Randolph Story"
1958	The Sergeant and the Lady	Sergeant Hastings	Television film
1958	The Quiet Man		Television film
1959	The Loretta Young Show	Joe	"Marriage Crisis"
1959	The Untouchables	Bill Hagen	"The Jake Lingle Killing"
1959	The Lineup	Army Armitage	"The Strange Return of Army Armitage"
1959	Alcoa Presents: One Step Beyond	Dan Gardner	"Father Image"
1959	Rawhide	Blake	S1:E15, "Incident of the Calico Gun"
1960	Bonanza	Clay Renton	"The Outcast"
1960	Naked City	Cary Glennon	"The Human Trap"
1961	Route 66	Gabe Johnson	"Play It Glissando"
1961	The Americans	Charlie Goodwin	"Half Moon Road"
1961	Outlaws	Jim Houston	"The Bell"
1961	The Robert Herridge Theater		"A Song with Orange in It"
1961	Stagecoach West	Russ Doty	"House of Violence"
1961	Stagecoach West	Johnny Dane	"The Butcher"
1961	Rawhide	Paul Evans	S3:E21, "Incident of His Brother's Keeper"
1961	Cain's Hundred	Wilt Farrell	"Dead Load: Dave Braddock"
1962	Checkmate	Ernie Chapin	"The Star System"
1962	Here's Hollywood	Himself	May 18, 1962
1962–1963	Stoney Burke	Stoney Burke	32 episodes
1964	Dr. Kildare	Dr. Frank Michaels	"A Willing Suspension of Disbelief"
1964	The Greatest Show on Earth	Wally Walker	"Man in a Hole"
1964	The Reporter	Nick Castle	"How Much for a Prince?"
1964	Grand Hotel		Television film
1965	Wagon Train	Lee Barton	"The Echo Pass Story"
1965	Kraft Suspense Theatre	Paul Campbell	"The Long Ravine"
1965	The Loner	Reverend Mr. Booker	"The Vespers"
1965	Combat!	Barney McKlosky	"The Linesman"
1965	12 O'Clock High	Lt. Col. Preston Gallagher	"Big Brother"
1965	Bob Hope Presents the Chrysler Theatre	Abe Perez	"The Crime"
1966	Laredo	Jab Harlan	"Above the Law"
1966	12 O'Clock High	Col. Arnold Yates	"Face of a Shadow"
1966	The F.B.I.	Frank Andreas Shroeder	"Collision Course"
1966	The Virginian	Roy Dallman	"High Stakes"
1966	Bob Hope Presents the Chrysler Theatre	Don Owens	"The Faceless Man"
1966	Bob Hope Presents the Chrysler Theatre	Harry Marcus	"Storm Crossing"
1966	The Tonight Show Starring Johnny Carson	Himself	
1966	The Doomsday Flight	Special Agent Frank Thompson	Television film
1967	The Invaders	George Vikor	"Vikor"
1967	The Fugitive	Alan Bartlett	"Goodbye My Love"
1967	Ironside	John Trask	"Dead Man's Tale"
1967	The Man from U.N.C.L.E.	Pharos Mandor	"The Master's Touch Affair"
1968	The High Chaparral	Dan Brookes	"The Kinsman"
1968–1980	Hawaii Five-O	Det. Capt. Steve McGarrett	281 episodes
1969	The Mike Douglas Show	Himself	
1969	The Ed Sullivan Show	Himself	Audience bow
1978	30th Annual Primetime Emmy Awards	Himself	
1979	Good Morning America	Himself	
1980	The Whales That Wouldn't Die	Narrator	
1980	M Station: Hawaii	Admiral Henderson	Television film Director; Executive producer Final on-screen role (final film role)
1999	The James Bond Story	Felix Leiter	Archive footage
2007	La tele de tu vida	Det. Capt. Steve McGarrett	Archive footage
2016	Hawaii Five-0 (2010 TV series)	Steve McGarrett	Season 7 - Episode 01 "Makaukau 'oe e Pa'ani?" / "Ready to Play?", CG effects, Body double Ken Matepi, Voiced by Cam Clarke

New title	Felix Leiter actor 1962	Succeeded by Cec Linder
New title	Steve McGarrett actor 1968 – '80	Succeeded by Alex O'Loughlin
