= List of Western films of the 1970s =

A list of Western films released in the 1970s.

Title	Director	Cast	Country	Subgenre/notes
1970
Adiós, Sabata	Frank Kramer	Yul Brynner, Dean Reed, Ignazio Spalla, Gérard Herter, Sal Borgese, Franco Fantasia, Joseph P. Persaud, Andrea Scotti, Gianni Rizzo	Italy	Spaghetti Western
And God Said to Cain	Antonio Margheriti	Klaus Kinski, Peter Carsten, Marcella Michelangeli	Italy	Spaghetti Western
Apocalypse Joe	Leopoldo Savona	Anthony Steffen, Eduardo Fajardo, Mary Paz Pondal	Italy; Spain	Spaghetti Western
Arizona Colt Returns	Sergio Martino	Anthony Steffen, Marcella Michelangeli, Aldo Sambrell	Italy	Spaghetti Western
Arizona Kid	Luciano B. Carlos	Chiquito, Mamie Van Doren, Gordon Mitchell, Mariela Branger, Bernard Bonnin	Philippines	FilAm Western
The Ballad of Cable Hogue	Sam Peckinpah	Jason Robards, Stella Stevens, David Warner, Strother Martin, Slim Pickens, L.Q. Jones, R.G. Armstrong, Gene Evans, William Mims, Kathleen Freeman, Susan O'Connell, Vaughn Taylor, Max Evans, James Anderson, Matthew Peckinpah, Easy Pickens	United States	Comedy Western
Ballad of Death Valley	Roberto Mauri	William Berger, Wayde Preston, Aldo Berti	Italy	Spaghetti Western
Barquero	Gordon Douglas	Lee Van Cleef, Warren Oates, Forrest Tucker, Kerwin Mathews, Mariette Hartley, Marie Gomez, Armando Silvestre	United States	Revisionist Western
The Beast	Mario Costa	Klaus Kinski, Gabriella Giorgelli, Remo Capitani	Italy	Spaghetti Western
The Boy Who Stole the Elephant	Michael Caffey	Parley Baer, Whitney Blake, Walter Burke	United States	Made for TV movie
Bullets Over Dallas	José María Zabalza	Carlos Quiney, Claudia Gravy, Luis Induni	Spain	Euro-Western
Cannon for Cordoba	Paul Wendkos	George Peppard, Giovanna Ralli, Raf Vallone, Pete Duel	United States; Spain	Mexico Western
Challenge of the McKennas	León Klimovsky	Robert Woods, John Ireland	Italy; Spain	Spaghetti Western
Chapaqua's Gold	Giancarlo Romitelli	George Ardisson, Linda Veras	Italy	Spaghetti Western
The Cheyenne Social Club	Gene Kelly	James Stewart, Henry Fonda, Shirley Jones, Sue Ane Langdon, Elaine Devry, Jackie Russell, Jackie Joseph, Sharon DeBord, Robert Middleton, Robert J. Wilke, Dabbs Greer, Alberto Morin	United States	Comedy Western
Chisum	Andrew V. McLaglen	John Wayne, Ben Johnson, Forrest Tucker, Patric Knowles, Geoffrey Deuel, Pamela McMyler, Glenn Corbett, Andrew Prine, Christopher George, Bruce Cabot, Richard Jaeckel, Lynda Day, Robert Donner, Christopher Mitchum, John Mitchum, John Agar, Edward Faulkner, Bill Bryant, Pedro Armendáriz Jr., Gregg Palmer, Alberto Morin	United States	Traditional Western
Chuck Moll	Enzo Barboni	Leonard Mann, Woody Strode, Peter Martell, George Eastman	Italy	Spaghetti Western
The Cockeyed Cowboys of Calico County	Anton Leader, Ranald MacDougall	Dan Blocker, Nanette Fabray, Jim Backus, Mickey Rooney, Wally Cox, Jack Elam, Noah Beery Jr., Don "Red" Barry	United States	Comedy Western
Compañeros	Sergio Corbucci	Franco Nero, Tomas Milian, Jack Palance	Italy	Spaghetti Western
El Condor	John Guillermin	Jim Brown, Lee Van Cleef, Patrick O'Neal, Marianna Hill, Iron Eyes Cody, Imogen Hassall, Elisha Cook Jr.	United States	Traditional Western
Cry Blood, Apache	Jack Starrett	Joel McCrea, Jody McCrea, Maria Gahua, Dan Kemp, Don Henley, Rik Nervik, Robert Tessier, Jack Starrett, Carolyn Stellar	United States	B Western
Deadlock	Roland Klick	Mario Adorf, Anthony Dawson	West Germany	Euro-Western
Dirty Dingus Magee	Burt Kennedy	Frank Sinatra, George Kennedy, Anne Jackson, Lois Nettleton, Jack Elam, Michele Carey, John Dehner, Henry Jones, Harry Carey Jr., Paul Fix, Terry Wilson	United States	Comedy Western
Django Defies Sartana	Pasquale Squitieri	George Ardisson, Tony Kendall, José Torres	Italy	Spaghetti Western
Django and Sartana Are Coming... It's the End	Demofilo Fidani, Diego Spataro	Jack Betts, Franco Borelli, Gordon Mitchell	Italy	Spaghetti Western
Django Meets Sartana	Demofilo Fidani	Jack Betts, Fabio Testi	Italy	Spaghetti Western
Fighters from Ave Maria	Bitto Albertini	Tony Kendall, Pietro Torrisi	Italy	Spaghetti Western
Finders Killers	Gianni Crea	Donald O'Brien, Gordon Mitchell	Italy	Spaghetti Western
Five Bloody Graves	Al Adamson	Robert Dix	United States	Horror Western
Five Savage Men (aka The Animals)	Ron Joy	Michele Carey, Henry Silva, John Anderson, Keenan Wynn, Joseph Turkel, Pepper Martin, Bobby Hall, Peter Hellman, Bill Bryant, Peggy Stewart	United States	Revisionist Western
Four Rode Out	John Peyser	Pernell Roberts, Sue Lyon, Leslie Nielsen	United States	Euro-Western
Have a Good Funeral, My Friend... Sartana Will Pay	Giuliano Carnimeo	Gianni Garko, Daniela Giordano, Ivano Staccioli, Helga Liné, Luis Induni, Franco Ressel, George Wang, Franco Pesce, Rick Boyd, Attilio Dottesio	Italy	Spaghetti Western
Hey Amigo! A Toast to Your Death	Paolo Bianchini	Wayde Preston, Rik Battaglia, Aldo Berti, Agnès Spaak, Raf Baldassarre, Marco Zuanelli, Franca Scagnetti	Italy	Spaghetti Western
I Am Sartana, Trade Your Guns for a Coffin	Giuliano Carnimeo	George Hilton, Charles Southwood	Italy	Spaghetti Western
The Intruders	William A. Graham	Don Murray, Anne Francis, Edmond O'Brien, John Saxon, Gene Evans, Edward Andrews, Shelly Novack, Harry Dean Stanton, Stuart Margolin, Zalman King, Phillip Alford, Harrison Ford	United States	Made for television movie
Kill Django... Kill First	Sergio Garrone	Giacomo Rossi-Stuart, Aldo Sambrell	Italy	Spaghetti Western
King of the Grizzlies	Ron Kelly	John Yesno, Chris Wiggins, Hugh Webster, Jack Van Evera	Canada; United States	Traditional Western
Land Raiders	Nathan Juran	Telly Savalas, George Maharis, Arlene Dahl, Janet Landgard, Guy Rolfe, Paul Picerni, Phil Brown, George Coulouris, H.P. Picerni, Jocelyn Lane, Fernando Rey, Robert Carricart, John Clark, Charles Stalnaker, Marcella St. Amant, Gustavo Rojo	United States	Traditional Western
Light the Fuse... Sartana Is Coming	Giuliano Carnimeo	Gianni Garko, Nieves Navarro, Massimo Serato	Italy	Spaghetti Western
Little Big Man	Arthur Penn	Dustin Hoffman, Faye Dunaway, Chief Dan George, Martin Balsam, Richard Mulligan, Jeff Corey, Thayer David, William Hickey, James Anderson	United States	Revisionist Western
A Man Called Horse	Elliot Silverstein	Richard Harris, Judith Anderson, Jean Gascon, Manu Tupou, Corinna Tsopei, Dub Taylor, James Gammon, William Jordan, Eddie Little Sky, Lina Marín, Manuel Padilla Jr., Iron Eyes Cody	United States	Western drama
A Man Called Sledge	Vic Morrow	James Garner, Dennis Weaver, Claude Akins, John Marley, Laura Antonelli, Wayde Preston, Ken Clark, Tony Young, Herman Reynoso, Steffen Zacharias, Paola Barbara, Laura Betti, Bruno Corazzari, Remo De Angelis, Altiero Di Giovanni, Lorenzo Fineschi, Franco Giornelli, Didi Perego, Lorenzo Piani, Mario Valgoi, Vic Morrow, Riccardo Garrone, Luciano Rossi, Fausto Tozzi, Angelo Infanti, Franco Balducci, Tiberio Mitri, Barta Barri, Orso Maria Guerrini, Gianni Di Benedetto	Italy	Spaghetti Western
Mátalo!	Cesare Canevari	Lou Castel, Corrado Pani, Antonio Salines	Italy	Spaghetti Western
The McMasters	Alf Kjellin	Burl Ives, Brock Peters, David Carradine, Nancy Kwan, Jack Palance, Dane Clark, John Carradine, L.Q. Jones, R.G. Armstrong, Alan Vint	United States	Revisionist Western
Menace on the Mountain	Vincent McEveety	Pat Crowley, Albert Salmi, Charles Aidman, Mitch Vogel	United States	Made for TV movie
Monte Walsh	William A. Fraker	Lee Marvin, Jack Palance, Jeanne Moreau, Mitchell Ryan, Jim Davis, G.D. Spradlin, John Hudkins, Raymond Guth, Michael Conrad, Ted Gehring, Bo Hopkins, John McLiam, Allyn Ann McLerie, Matt Clark, Charles Tyner, Richard Farnsworth	United States	Traditional Western
More Dollars for the MacGregors	José Luis Merino	Peter Lee Lawrence, Carlos Quiney	Italy	Spaghetti Western
Ned Kelly	Tony Richardson	Mick Jagger, Mark McManus, Clarissa Kaye	United Kingdom	Outback Western
The Over-the-Hill Gang Rides Again	George McCowan	Walter Brennan, Fred Astaire, Edgar Buchanan, Andy Devine, Chill Wills, Paul Richards, Lana Wood, Parley Baer, Walter Burke, Lillian Bronson, Jonathan Hole, Burt Mustin, Don Wilbanks, Pepper Martin, Eddie Quillan	United States	Made for television movie/comedy Western
The Phantom Gunslinger	Albert Zugsmith	Troy Donohue, Sabrina	Mexico; United States	Mexican/American Western
Rebels of Arizona	José María Zabalza	Carlos Quiney	Spain	Spaghetti Western
Reverend's Colt	Marino Girolami	Guy Madison	Spain	Spaghetti Western
Ringo, It's Massacre Time	Mario Pinzauti	Jean Louis, Omero Gargano	Italy	Spaghetti Western
Rio Lobo	Howard Hawks	John Wayne, Jorge Rivero, Jennifer O'Neill, Christopher Mitchum, Jack Elam, Victor French, Susana Dosamantes, Sherry Lansing, David Huddleston, Mike Henry, Bill Williams, Jim Davis, Robert Donner, Hank Worden, Peter Jason, Edward Faulkner, Chuck Courtney, George Plimpton, Gregg Palmer, Jerry Gatlin	United States	Traditional Western
Roy Colt and Winchester Jack	Mario Bava	Brett Halsey, Charles Southward	Italy	Spaghetti Western
Sabata the Killer	Tulio Demicheli	Anthony Steffen, Peter Lee Lawrence	Italy	Spaghetti Western
Sartana Kills Them All	Rafael Romero Marchent	Gianni Garko, María Silva	Italy	Spaghetti Western
Shango	Edoardo Mulargia	Anthony Steffen, Eduardo Fajardo	Italy	Spaghetti Western
Soldier Blue	Ralph Nelson	Peter Strauss, Candice Bergen, Donald Pleasence, John Anderson, Jorge Rivero, Dana Elcar, Martin West, James Hampton, Mort Mills, Jorge Russek, Alf Elson	United States	Revisionist Western/cavalry Western
Speedy Gonzales – noin 7 veljeksen poika	Ere Kokkonen	Spede Pasanen, Esko Salminen, Ville-Veikko Salminen	Finland	Comedy Western
Stranger That Kneels Beside the Shadow of a Corpse	Demofilo Fidani	Jack Betts, Franco Borelli, Gordon Mitchell	Italy	Spaghetti Western
Su Precio... Unos Dólares	Raúl de Anda II	Rodolfo de Anda, Sonia Furió, Pedro Armendáriz Jr, Mário Almada	Mexico	Revisionist Western
There Was a Crooked Man...	Joseph L. Mankiewicz	Kirk Douglas, Henry Fonda, Hume Cronyn, Warren Oates, Burgess Meredith, John Randolph, Lee Grant, Arthur O'Connell, Martin Gabel, Michael Blodgett, C.K. Yang, Alan Hale Jr., Victor French, Claudia McNeil, Bert Freed, Jeanne Cooper, Barbara Rhoades, Gene Evans, Pamela Hensley, J. Edward McKinley, Ann Doran	United States	Comedy Western
Three Bullets... for a Long Gun	Peter Henkel	Beau Brummell, Keith G. van der Wat	South Africa; West Germany	Euro-Western
Tödlicher Irrtum	Konrad Petzold	Armin Mueller-Stahl, Gojko Mitić	East Germany	Revisionist Western
El Topo	Alejandro Jodorowsky	Alejandro Jodorowsky, Brontis Jodorowsky	Mexico	Acid Western
Tough Guys of the Prairie	Carl Ottosen	Dirch Passer, Paul Hagen, Preben Kaas	Denmark	Comedy Western
The Traveling Executioner	Jack Smight	Stacy Keach, Marianna Hill, Bud Cort, Graham Jarvis, James J. Sloyan, M. Emmet Walsh, John Bottoms, Ford Rainey, James Greene, Sam Reese, Val Avery, Stefan Gierasch, Logan Ramsey, Charles Tyner, William Mims, Walt Barnes, Charlie Briggs	United States	Comedy Western
Twenty Paces to Death	Manuel Esteba, Antonio Mollica	Dean Reed, Alberto Farnese	Spain	Spaghetti Western
Twenty Thousand Dollars for Every Corpse	José María Zabalza	Miguel de la Riva, Dyanik Zurakowska	Spain	Spaghetti Western
Two Mules for Sister Sara	Don Siegel	Clint Eastwood, Shirley MacLaine, Manolo Fábregas, Alberto Morin, Armando Silvestre, John Kelly, Enrique Lucero, David Estuardo, Ada Carrasco, Pancho Córdova, José Chávez, José Ángel Espinosa, Rosa Furman	United States; Mexico	Traditional Western set in Mexico
Wanted Sabata	Roberto Mauri	Brad Harris, Vassili Karis, Elena Pedemonte	Italy	Spaghetti Western
The Wild Country	Robert Totten	Steve Forrest, Vera Miles Jack Elam, Ron Howard, Clint Howard, Frank de Kova, Morgan Woodward, Dub Taylor, Woodrow Chambliss, Karl Swenson, Mills Watson	United States	Traditional Western
Wild Women	Don Taylor	Hugh O'Brian, Anne Francis, Marilyn Maxwell, Marie Windsor, Sherry Jackson, Robert F. Simon, Richard Kelton, Cynthia Hull, Pepe Callahan, Ed Call, John Neris, Troy Melton, Joseph Kaufmann, Chuck Hicks, Jim Boles, Michael Keep	United States	Made for television movie
The Wind's Fierce	Mario Camus	Terence Hill, Mario Pardo, Fernando Rey	Italy	Euro-Western
The Young Country	Roy Huggins	Walter Brennan, Joan Hackett, Wally Cox, Pete Duel, Roger Davis	United States	Made for television movie
1971
Acquasanta Joe	Mario Gariazzo	Ty Hardin, Richard Harrison	Italy	Spaghetti Western
Bad Man's River (aka Hunt the Man Down)	Eugenio Martín	Lee Van Cleef, Gina Lollobrigida, James Mason, Simón Andreu, Gianni Garko, Diana Lorys, Sergio Fantoni, Aldo Sambrell, Jess Hahn, Daniel Martín, Luis Rivera, Lone Fleming, Eduardo Fajardo, José Manuel Martín	Spain; Italy; France	Euro-Western
The Beguiled	Don Siegel	Clint Eastwood, Geraldine Page, Elizabeth Hartman, Jo Ann Harris, Darleen Carr, Mae Mercer, Pamelyn Ferdin, Melody Thomas	United States	Thriller drama
Big Jake	George Sherman	John Wayne, Richard Boone, Maureen O'Hara, Patrick Wayne, Christopher Mitchum, Bruce Cabot, Bobby Vinton, Glenn Corbett, John Doucette, Jim Davis, John Agar, Harry Carey Jr., Gregg Palmer, Jerry Gatlin	United States	Traditional Western
Black Noon	Bernard L. Kowalski	Roy Thinnes, Yvette Mimieux, Lynn Loring	United States	Horror Western
Blindman	Ferdinando Baldi	Tony Anthony, Ringo Starr, Lloyd Battista, Magda Konopka, Raf Baldassarre, Agneta Eckemyr, David Dreyer, Marisa Solinas, Gaetano Scala, Guido Mannari, Tito García, Allen Klein, Mal Evans, Malisa Longo, Krista Nell, Solvi Stubing	Italy; United States	Spaghetti Western
Captain Apache	Alexander Singer	Lee Van Cleef, Carroll Baker, Stuart Whitman, Percy Herbert, Elisa Montes, Charly Bravo, Charles Stal Maker, Tony Vogel, Faith Clift, Dee Pollock, Dan van Husen, Hugh McDermott, Elsa Zabala	United Kingdom; Spain	Euro-Western
Catlow	Sam Wanamaker	Yul Brynner, Richard Crenna, Leonard Nimoy, Leonard Nimoy, Daliah Lavi, Jo Ann Pflug, Jeff Corey, Michael Delano, Julián Mateos, David Ladd, Bob Logan, John Clark, Dan van Husen, Bessie Love, José Nieto, Walter Coy	United States	Outlaw Western
Çilginlar ordusu	T. Fikret Uçak	Yilmaz Köksal, Yavuz Selekman, Ihsan Gedik	Turkey	
Daisy Town	René Goscinny	Marcel Bozzuffi, Pierre Trabaud	France; Belgium	Animated Euro-Western
The Deserter	Niksa Fulgosi, Burt Kennedy	Bekim Fehmiu, John Huston, Richard Crenna, Chuck Connors, Ricardo Montalbán, Ian Bannen, Brandon deWilde, Slim Pickens, Woody Strode, Albert Salmi, Patrick Wayne	Italy; Yugoslavia	Euro-Western/cavalry Western
The Devil and Miss Sarah	Michael Caffey	Gene Barry Janice Rule, James Drury	United States	Horror Western
Doc	Frank Perry	Stacy Keach, Faye Dunaway, Harris Yulin, Michael Witney, Denver John Collins, Richard McKenzie, John Bottoms, Penelope Allen, Philip Shafer	United States	Outlaw Western
A Fistful of Dynamite	Sergio Leone	Rod Steiger, James Coburn, Romolo Valli, Maria Monti, Rik Battaglia, Franco Graziosi, Antoine Saint-John, Vivienne Chandler, David Warbeck	Italy	Spaghetti Western
Four Rode Out	John Peyser	Sue Lyon, Pernell Roberts, Leslie Nielsen	United States; Spain	B Western
A Gunfight	Lamont Johnson	Kirk Douglas, Johnny Cash, Jane Alexander, Karen Black, Keith Carradine, Dana Elcar, Raf Vallone, Eric Douglas, Robert J. Wilke, Paul Lambert	United States	Outlaw Western
Hannie Caulder	Burt Kennedy	Raquel Welch, Robert Culp, Ernest Borgnine, Jack Elam, Strother Martin, Christopher Lee, Diana Dors, Brian Lightburn, Luis Barboo, Stephen Boyd	United Kingdom; Spain	Euro-Western
Her kursuna bir ölü	Mehmet Aslan	Irfan Atasoy, Feri Cansel, Erol Taş	Turkey	
The Hired Hand	Peter Fonda	Peter Fonda, Warren Oates, Verna Bloom, Robert Pratt, Severn Darden, Rita Rogers, Ann Doran, Ted Markland, Owen Orr, Al Hopson, Megan Denver, Michael McClure, Gray Johnson	United States	Acid Western
Hitched	Boris Sagal	Sally Field, Tim Matheson, Neville Brand, Slim Pickens, John Fiedler, Denver Pyle, John McLiam, Kathleen Freeman, Don Knight, Bo Svenson, Bill Zuckert, Charles Lane, Luana Anders, John Anderson, John Davis Chandler, Henry Jones	United States	Made for television movie
The Hunting Party	Don Medford	Oliver Reed, Gene Hackman, Candice Bergen, Simon Oakland, L.Q. Jones, Mitchell Ryan, Ronald Howard, William Watson, G.D. Spradlin, Rayford Barnes, Bernard Kay, Richard Adams, Dean Selmier, Francesca Tu	United Kingdom	Euro-Western
The Last Rebel	Larry G. Spangler	Joe Namath, Jack Elam, Woody Strode, Ty Hardin, Victoria George, Renato Romano, Marina Coffa, Annamaria Chio, Mike Forrest, Bruce Eweka, Jessica Dublin, Larry Laurence, Sebastian Segriff, Al Hassan, Art Johnson, Paul Sheriff, Troy Patterson, Rick Wells, Dominic Barto, James Garbo, Tomas Rudy	United States	Blaxploiation revisionist Western
Lawman	Michael Winner	Burt Lancaster, Robert Ryan, Lee J. Cobb, Robert Duvall, Sheree North, Albert Salmi, J.D. Cannon, Joseph Wiseman, Richard Jordan, John McGiver, Ralph Waite, John Beck, William C. Watson, Walter Brooke, Robert Emhardt, Richard Bull, John Hillerman, Hugh McDermott	United States	Traditional Western
Lock, Stock and Barrel	Jerry Thorpe	Tim Matheson, Belinda Montgomery	United States	Made for television movie
Long Live Your Death (aka Don't Turn the Other Cheek!)	Duccio Tessari	Franco Nero, Eli Wallach, Lynn Redgrave, Horst Janson, Eduardo Fajardo, Marilù Tolo, Gisela Hahn, Víctor Israel, Enrique Espinosa, Dan van Husen, José Jaspe, Furio Meniconi, Mirko Ellis, Gunda Hiller, José Moreno, Carla Mancini, Tito García, Lorenzo Robledo	Italy	Spaghetti Western
Man and Boy	E.W. Swackhamer	Bill Cosby, Gloria Foster, Leif Erickson, George Spell, Douglas Turner Ward, John Anderson, Henry Silva, Dub Taylor, Yaphet Kotto, Shelley Morrison, Richard Bull, Robert Lawson, Jason Clark, Fred Graham, Jack Owens	United States	Revisionist Western
Man in the Wilderness	Richard C. Sarafian	Richard Harris, John Huston, Henry Wilcoxon, Prunella Ransome, Percy Herbert, Dennis Waterman, Norman Rossington, James Doohan, Bryan Marshall, Ben Carruthers, John Bindon, Robert Russell, Sheila Raynor, Judith Furse	United States	
McCabe & Mrs. Miller	Robert Altman	Warren Beatty, Julie Christie, René Auberjonois, Michael Murphy, Antony Holland, Bert Remsen, Shelley Duvall, Keith Carradine	United States	Anti-Western
La mula de Cullen Baker	René Cardona	Rodolfo de Anda, Armando Costa	Mexico	Mexico Western
One More Train to Rob	Andrew V. McLaglen	George Peppard, Diana Muldaur, John Vernon, France Nuyen, Soon-Tek Oh, Steve Sandor, Pamela McMyler, Richard Loo, Robert Donner, John Doucette, C.K. Yang, Marie Windsor, Timothy Scott, Joan Shawlee, Hal Needham, Harry Carey Jr., Jerry Gatlin	United States	Comedy Western
Osceola	Konrad Petzold	Gojko Mitić, Horst Schulze	East Germany; Bulgaria; Cuba	Red Florida Western
Un par de asesinos	Rafael Romero Marchent		Spain	
Les Pétroleuses (aka The Legend of Frenchie King)	Christian-Jaque	Brigitte Bardot, Claudia Cardinale, Michael J. Pollard	France; Italy; Spain; United Kingdom	Comedy/Euro-Western
Red Sun	Terence Young	Charles Bronson, Ursula Andress, Toshirō Mifune, Alain Delon, Capucine, Barta Barri, Lee Burton, Anthony Dawson, John Hamilton, George W. Lycan, Luc Merenda, Tetsu Nakamura, Mónica Randall, José Nieto, Julio Peña, Ricardo Palacios	France; Italy; Spain	Euro-Samurai Western
Return of Sabata	Frank Kramer	Lee Van Cleef, Reiner Schöne, Giampiero Albertini, Ignazio Spalla, Annabella Incontrera, Jacqueline Alexandre, Franco Fantasia	Italy	Spaghetti Western
Scandalous John	Robert Butler	Brian Keith, Alfonso Arau, Michele Carey, Rick Lenz	United States	Comedy Western
Shoot Out	Henry Hathaway	Gregory Peck, Patricia Quinn, James Gregory, Robert F. Lyons, Susan Tyrrell, Jeff Corey, John Davis Chandler, Paul Fix, Arthur Hunnicutt	United States	Outlaw Western
Skin Game	Paul Bogart, Gordon Douglas	James Garner, Louis Gossett Jr., Susan Clark, Brenda Sykes, Edward Asner, Andrew Duggan, Henry Jones, Richard Farnsworth, Parley Baer, Royal Dano	United States	Comedy Western
Something Big	Andrew V. McLaglen	Dean Martin, Honor Blackman, Brian Keith, Carol White, Ben Johnson, Albert Salmi, Denver Pyle, Harry Carey Jr., Robert Donner, Paul Fix	United States	Comedy Western
Support Your Local Gunfighter	Burt Kennedy	James Garner, Suzanne Pleshette, Harry Morgan, Jack Elam, John Dehner, Marie Windsor, Dub Taylor, Joan Blondell, Kathleen Freeman, Henry Jones, Chuck Connors, Jerry Gatlin	United States	Comedy Western
They Call Me Trinity	Enzo Barboni	Terence Hill, Bud Spencer, Farley Granger, Steffen Zacharias, Dan Sturkie, Gisela Hahn, Elena Pedemonte, Ezio Marano, Luciano Rossi, Michele Cimarosa, Ugo Sasso, Remo Capitani, Riccardo Pizzuti, Gigi Bonos	Italy	Spaghetti Western/comedy Western
A Town Called Hell	Robert Parrish	Robert Shaw, Telly Savalas, Stella Stevens, Martin Landau, Fernando Rey, Al Lettieri, Michael Craig, Dudley Sutton, Paloma Cela, Aldo Sambrell	United Kingdom; Spain	Euro-Western
The Trackers	Earl Bellamy	Sammy Davis Jr., Ernest Borgnine, Julie Adams, Connie Kreski, Norman Alden, Jim Davis, Caleb Brooks, Arthur Hunnicutt, Leo Gordon, David Renard, Bill Katt, Ross Elliott, Lee de Broux, Bucklind Noah Beery	United States	Made for television movie
The Unhanged	Spede Pasanen, Vesa-Matti Loiri	Spede Pasanen, Vesa-Matti Loiri, Simo Salminen	Finland	Comedy Western
Valdez Is Coming	Edwin Sherin	Burt Lancaster, Susan Clark, Jon Cypher, Frank Silvera, Héctor Elizondo, Richard Jordan, Phil Brown, Richard Jordan, Barton Heyman, Ralph Brown, Werner Hasselmann, Lex Monson, Sylvia Poggioli, José García García, María Montez, Juanita Penaloza	United States	Revisionist Western
Whity	Rainer Werner Fassbinder	Ron Randell, Hanna Schygulla	West Germany	Euro-Western
Who Killed the Mysterious Mr. Foster?	Fielder Cook	Ernest Borgnine, Stephen R. Hudis, Judy Geeson, Will Geer, J.D. Cannon, Bruce Dern, Sam Jaffe, Carmen Mathews, John McGiver	United States	Made for television movie
Wild Rovers	Blake Edwards	William Holden, Ryan O'Neal, Karl Malden, Joe Don Baker, Tom Skerritt, James Olson, Lynn Carlin, Leora Dana, Victor French, Rachel Roberts, Moses Gunn, Sam Gilman, Charles Gray, Bill Bryant, Jack Garner, William Lucking, Ed Bakey, Ted Gehring, Alan Carney	United States	Epic Western
Yuma	Ted Post	Clint Walker, Barry Sullivan, Kathryn Hays, Edgar Buchanan, Morgan Woodward, John Kerr, Peter Mark Richman, Bing Russell, Robert Phillips, Miguel Alejandro	United States	Made for television movie
Zachariah	George Englund	John Rubinstein, Pat Quinn, Don Johnson, Country Joe and The Fish, Elvin Jones, Doug Kershaw, William Challee, Dick Van Patten, The James Gang, White Lightnin'	United States	Acid Western
1972
Amico, stammi lontano almeno un palmo	Michele Lupo	Giuliano Gemma, George Eastman, Vittorio Congia	Italy; France	Spaghetti Western
Bad Company	Robert Benton	Jeff Bridges, Barry Brown, Jim Davis, David Huddleston, John Savage, Jerry Houser, Damon Cofer, Joshua Hill Lewis, Geoffrey Lewis, Raymond Guth, Ed Lauter, John Quade, Charles Tyner, Ted Gehring, Claudia Bryar, John Boyd	United States	Acid Western
La Banda J.S.: Cronaca criminale del Far West (aka Sonny and Jed)	Sergio Corbucci	Tomas Milian, Susan George, Telly Savalas	Italy	Comedy/spaghetti Western
The Bounty Man	John Llewellyn Moxey	Clint Walker, Richard Basehart, John Ericson, Margot Kidder, Gene Evans, Arthur Hunnicutt, Rex Holman, Wayne Sutherlin, Paul Harper, Dennis Cross, Vince St. Cyr, Glenn R. Wilder, Hal Needham, Rita Conde, Robert Swan, Duke Cigrang	United States	Made for television movie
The Bravos	Ted Post	George Peppard, Pernell Roberts, Belinda Montgomery, L.Q. Jones, Dana Elcar, George Murdock, Bo Svenson, Vincent Van Patten	United States	Made for television movie/television pilot
Buck and the Preacher	Sidney Poitier	Sidney Poitier, Harry Belafonte, Ruby Dee, Cameron Mitchell, Denny Miller, Nita Talbot, John Kelly, Tony Brubaker, Bobby Johnson, James McEachin, Clarence Muse, Lynn Hamilton, Doug Johnson, Errol John, Jullie Robinson, Enrique Lucero, Jerry Gatlin	United States	Blaxploiation revisionist Western
The Bull of the West	Jerry Hopper, Paul Stanley	Charles Bronson, Lee J. Cobb, Clu Gulager, Ben Johnson, Brian Keith, George Kennedy, Doug McClure, Geraldine Brooks, DeForest Kelley	United States	B Western (two episodes of the TV series The Virginian, edited together)
Chato's Land	Michael Winner	Charles Bronson, Jack Palance, James Whitmore, Simon Oakland, Richard Basehart, Ralph Waite, Richard Jordan, Victor French	United States	Revisionist Western
Condenados a vivir (aka Cut-Throats Nine)	Joaquín Luis Romero Marchent	Claudio Undari, Emma Cohen, Alberto Dalbés	Spain	Euro-Western
The Cowboys	Mark Rydell	John Wayne, Roscoe Lee Browne, Bruce Dern, Colleen Dewhurst, Slim Pickens, Sarah Cunningham, Allyn Ann McLerie, Robert Carradine, A. Martinez, Matt Clark, Richard Farnsworth, Jerry Gatlin	United States	Traditional Western
Cry for Me, Billy	William A. Graham	Cliff Potts, Maria Potts	United States	
The Culpepper Cattle Co.	Dick Richards	Gary Grimes, Billy Green Bush, Bo Hopkins, Luke Askew, Geoffrey Lewis, Wayne Sutherlin, Matt Clark, Anthony James, Charles Martin Smith, Jerry Gatlin	United States	Cattle drive Western
Deaf Smith & Johnny Ears	Paolo Cavara	Franco Nero, Anthony Quinn, Pamela Tiffin, Franco Graziosi, Princess Ira von Fürstenberg	Italy	Spaghetti Western
Dirty Little Billy	Stan Dragoti	Michael J. Pollard, Richard Evans, Lee Purcell, Charles Aidman, Dran Hamilton, Willard Sage, Mills Watson, Alex Wilson, Ronny Graham, Josip Elic, Richard Stahl, Gary Busey, Dick Van Patten, Scott Walker, Rosary Nix, Frank Welker, Severn Darden, Len Lesser, Ed Lauter, Nick Nolte	United States	Acid Western
Evil Roy Slade	Jerry Paris	John Astin, Pamela Austin, Mickey Rooney, Henry Gibson, Dick Shawn, Pat Buttram, Luana Anders, Milton Berle, Dom DeLuise, Pat Morita, Penny Marshall	United States	Comedy Western
The Great Northfield Minnesota Raid	Philip Kaufman	Cliff Robertson, Robert Duvall, Luke Askew, R. G. Armstrong, Dana Elcar, Donald Moffat, John Pearce, Matt Clark, Wayne Sutherlin, Elisha Cook, Royal Dano	United States	Outlaw Western
Hardcase	John Llewellyn Moxey	Clint Walker, Stefanie Powers	United States	Made for television movie
The Honkers	Steve Ihnat	James Coburn, Lois Nettleton, Slim Pickens, Anne Archer, Richard Anderson, Joan Huntington, Jim Davis, Ramon Bieri, Teddy Eccles, Mitchell Ryan, Wayne McLaren, John Harmon, Richard O'Brien, Larry Mahan, Jerry Gatlin	United States	Contemporary Western
It Can Be Done, Amigo	Maurizio Lucidi	Bud Spencer, Jack Palance	Italy; Spain; France	Euro-Western comedy
J.W. Coop	Cliff Robertson	Cliff Robertson, Geraldine Page, Cristina Ferrare, R.G. Armstrong, R.L. Armstrong, John Crawford, Wade Crosby, Marjorie Durant Dye, Paul Harper, Son Hooker, Richard Kennedy, Bruce Kirby, Larry Mahan, Mary-Robin Redd, Dennis Reiners	United States	Contemporary Western
Jeremiah Johnson	Sydney Pollack	Robert Redford, Will Geer, Stefan Gierasch, Delle Bolton, Josh Albee, Joaquín Martínez, Allyn Ann McLerie, Paul Benedict, Jack Colvin, Matt Clark, Richard Angarola, Charles Tyner	United States	Traditional Western
Joe Kidd	John Sturges	Clint Eastwood, Robert Duvall, John Saxon, Don Stroud, Stella Garcia, James Wainwright, Paul Koslo, Gregory Walcott, Dick Van Patten, Joaquín Martínez, Clint Ritchie	United States	Traditional Western
Judas... ¡toma tus monedas!	Alfonso Balcázar		Spain	Spaghetti Western
Junior Bonner	Sam Peckinpah	Steve McQueen, Robert Preston, Ida Lupino, Ben Johnson, Joe Don Baker, Barbara Leigh, Mary Murphy, Bill McKinney, Dub Taylor, Don "Red" Barry, Charles H. Gray	United States	Contemporary Western
Justin Morgan Had a Horse	Hollingsworth Morse	Don Murray, R.G. Armstrong	United States	Traditional Western
Kanun adami	Nazmi Özer	Ayhan Işik, Salih Güney, Seyyal Taner	Turkey	
The Legend of Nigger Charley	Martin Goldman	Fred Williamson, D'Urville Martin, Don Pedro Colley, Jerry Gatlin	United States	Blaxploitation Western
The Life and Times of Judge Roy Bean	John Huston	Paul Newman, Victoria Principal, Anthony Perkins, Ned Beatty, Jacqueline Bisset, Tab Hunter, John Huston, Ava Gardner, Richard Farnsworth, Stacy Keach, Michael Sarrazin, Roddy McDowall, Anthony Zerbe, Matt Clark, Bill McKinney, Steve Kanaly	United States	
Le llamaban Calamidad	Alfonso Balcázar		Spain	Spaghetti Western
The Magnificent Seven Ride!	George McGowan	Lee Van Cleef, Michael Callan, Stefanie Powers, Luke Askew, James Sikking, Pedro Armendáriz Jr., William Lucking, Ed Lauter, Mariette Hartley, Ralph Waite, Melissa Murphy, Allyn Ann McLerie, Gary Busey	United States	Traditional Western
The Marshal of Windy Hollow	Jerry Whittington	Sunset Carson, Ken Maynard, Tex Ritter	United States	Classic B Western
Molly and Lawless John	Gary Nelson	Vera Miles, Sam Elliott, John Anderson	United States	Outlaw Western
My Name Is Shanghai Joe	Mario Caiano	Klaus Kinski	Italy	Spaghetti Western
Ölmek var dönmek yok	Yilmaz Atadeniz	Irfan Atasoy, Feri Cansel, Erol Tas	Turkey	
Pancho Villa	Eugenio Martín	Telly Savalas, Clint Walker, Chuck Connors, Anne Francis, José María Prada, Ángel del Pozo, Luis Dávila, Mónica Randall, Antonio Casas, Alberto Dalbés, Walter Coy	United States; United Kingdom; Spain	Spaghetti Western
Panhandle 38	Antonio Secchi	Keenan Wynn, Scott Holden, Delia Boccardo	Italy	Spaghetti Western
Pocket Money	Stuart Rosenberg	Paul Newman, Lee Marvin, Strother Martin, Wayne Rogers, Hector Elizondo, Christine Belford, Kelly Jean Peters, Gregg Sierra, Fred Graham, Matt Clark, Claudio Miranda, Terrence Malick	United States	Contemporary Western
The Proud and the Damned	Ferde Gofré Jr.	Chuck Connors, Cesar Romero, Peter Ford	Italy	Spaghetti Western
A Reason to Live, a Reason to Die	Tonino Valerii	James Coburn, Telly Savalas, Bud Spencer, Reinhard Kolldehoff, José Suarez, Georges Géret, Ugo Fangareggi, Guy Mairesse, Benito Stefanelli, Adolfo Lastretti, Joe Pollini, Ángel Álvarez	Italy	Spaghetti Western
El retorno de Clint el solitario	Alfonso Balcázar	George Martin, Marina Malfatti, Klaus Kinski	Spain	Spaghetti Western
The Revengers	Daniel Mann	William Holden, Ernest Borgnine, Woody Strode, Roger Hanin, Susan Hayward, René Koldehoff, Jorge Martínez de Hoyos, Arthur Hunnicutt, Warren Vanders, Larry Pennell, John Kelly, James Daughton, Scott Holden, Lorraine Chanel, Jorge Luke	United States	Revisionist Western
Run, Cougar, Run	Jerome Courtland	Stuart Whitman, Frank Aletter, Lonny Chapman, Douglas Fowley, Harry Carey Jr., Alfonso Arau	United States	Traditional Western
Sehvet	Tunç Basaran	Tamer Yiğit, Figen Han, Fatma Belgen	Turkey	
Seytan tirnagi	Taner Oguz	Istemi Betil, Deniz Erkanat, Hüseyin Zan	Turkey	
Tecumseh	Hans Kratzert	Gojko Mitić, Annekathrin Bürger	East Germany	Frontier red Western
Trinity Is Still My Name	Enzo Barboni	Terence Hill, Bud Spencer, Yanti Somer, Harry Carey Jr., Jessica Dublin, Emilio Delle Piane, Enzo Tarascio, Pupo De Luca, Benito Stefanelli, Riccardo Pizzuti, Enzo Fiermonte, Dana Ghia, Franco Ressel, Gérard Landry, Luigi Bonos, Antonio Monselesan	Italy	Spaghetti Western
Ulzana's Raid	Robert Aldrich	Burt Lancaster, Bruce Davison, Jorge Luke, Richard Jaeckel, Joaquín Martínez, Karl Swenson, John Pearce, Richard Farnsworth, Jerry Gatlin	United States	
Vsadnik bez golovy	Vladimir Vaynshtok	Lyudmila Savelyeva, Oleg Vidov	Soviet Union; Cuba	
What Am I Doing in the Middle of a Revolution?	Sergio Corbucci	Vittorio Gassman, Paolo Villaggio	Italy; Spain	Spaghetti Western
When the Legends Die	Stuart Millar	Richard Widmark, Frederic Forrest, Luana Anders, Vito Scotti, Herbert Nelson, John War Eagle, John Gruber, Garry Walberg, Tillman Box, Sondra Pratt	United States	Contemporary Western
The Wrath of God	Ralph Nelson	Robert Mitchum, Frank Langella, Rita Hayworth, John Colicos, Victor Buono, Ken Hutchison, Paula Pritchett, Gregory Sierra, Frank Ramirez, Enrique Lucero, Jorge Russek, José Luis Parades, Aurora Clavel, Pancho Cordova	United States	
1973
Apachen	Gottfried Kolditz	Gojko Mitić, Milan Beli, Colea Răutu	East Germany	Red Western
The Brothers O'Toole	Richard Erdman	John Astin, Lee Meriwether, Pat Carroll	United States	Comedy Western
Cahill U.S. Marshal	Andrew V. McLaglen	John Wayne, George Kennedy, Gary Grimes, Neville Brand, Clay O'Brien, Marie Windsor, Morgan Paull, Dan Vadis, Royal Dano, Scott Walker, Denver Pyle, Harry Carey Jr., Walter Barnes, Paul Fix, Hank Worden, Jerry Gatlin	United States	Traditional Western
Chino	John Sturges, Duilio Coletti	Charles Bronson, Jill Ireland, Marcel Bozzuffi, Vincent Van Patten, Fausto Tozzi, Ettore Manni, Corrado Gaipa, Melissa Chimenti	Italy	Spaghetti Western
The Deadly Trackers	Barry Shear	Richard Harris, Rod Taylor, Al Lettieri, Neville Brand, William Smith, Paul Benjamin, Pedro Armendáriz Jr., Isela Vega, Kelly Jean Peters, William Bryant	United States	
Un dolar de recompensa/Prey of Vultures	Rafael Romero Marchent	Peter Lee Lawrence	Spain	
Don't Touch the White Woman!	Marco Ferreri	Catherine Deneuve, Marcello Mastroianni, Michel Piccoli	France; Italy	Surreal/farce Western
Female Artillery	Marvin J. Chomsky	Dennis Weaver, Ida Lupino, Sally Ann Howes, Linda Evans, Lee Harcourt Montgomery, Albert Salmi, Nina Foch, Anna Navarro, Charles Dierkop, Nate Esformes, Lee de Broux, Robert Sorrells, Bobby Eilbacher, Robby Weaver	United States	Made for television movie
The Gatling Gun	Robert Gordon	Guy Stockwell, Robert Fuller, Patrick Wayne, Woody Strode, Barbara Luna, Pat Buttram, John Carradine rowspan="2" | Traditional Western	United States	
Guns of a Stranger	Robert Hinkle	Marty Robbins, Chill Wills, Dovie Beams, Steve Tackett, William Foster, Shug Fisher, Tom Hartman, Charley Aldridge, Ronny Robbins, Melody Hinkle, Mark Reed, Don Winters, Bobby Sykes, Fred Graham, Phil Strassberg, Jenny Needham	United States	
High Plains Drifter	Clint Eastwood	Clint Eastwood, Verna Bloom, Billy Curtis, Marianna Hill, Mitchell Ryan, Jack Ging, Stefan Gierasch, Ted Hartley, Geoffrey Lewis, Dan Vadis, Anthony James, Walter Barnes, Paul Brinegar, Richard Bull, Robert Donner, John Hillerman, John Quade, Buddy Van Horn, William O'Connell	United States	Mystery/revisionist Western
Jory	Jorge Fons	Robby Benson, John Marley, B.J. Thomas, Claudio Brook, Patricia Aspíllaga, Brad Dexter, Benny Baker, Todd Martin, Quintín Bulnes, Carlos Cortés, John Kelly, Anne Lockhart, Ted Markland, Linda Purl, Eduardo López Rojas	United States; Mexico	Traditional Western
Kid Blue	James Frawley	Dennis Hopper, Warren Oates, Peter Boyle, Ben Johnson, Lee Purcell, Janice Rule, Ralph Waite, Clifton James, Claude Ennis Starrett Jr., Warren Finnerty, Howard Hesseman, M. Emmet Walsh	United States	Comedy Western
Küçük Kovboy	Guido Zurli	İlker İnanoğlu, Cüneyt Arkın, Pascale Petit	Turkey; Italy	
The Man Who Loved Cat Dancing	Richard C. Sarafian	Burt Reynolds, Sarah Miles, Lee J. Cobb, Jack Warden, George Hamilton, Bo Hopkins, Robert Donner, Jay Silverheels	United States	Romance Western
My Name is Nobody	Tonino Valerii	Terence Hill, Henry Fonda, Jean Martin, R.G. Armstrong, Karl Braun, Leo Gordon, Steve Kanaly, Geoffrey Lewis, Neil Summers, Piero Lulli, Mario Brega, Marc Mazza, Benito Stefanelli, Alexander Allerson, Antoine Saint-John, Franco Angrisano, Jackson D. Kane, Antonio Molino Rojo	Italy	Comedy/spaghetti Western
Oklahoma Crude	Stanley Kramer	George C. Scott, Faye Dunaway, John Mills, Jack Palance, William Lucking, Harvey Jason, Ted Gehring, Cliff Osmond, Rafael Campos, Woodrow Parfrey, John Hudkins, Harvey Parry, Jim Burk, Hal Smith, Larry D. Mann, John Dierkes, Billy Varga	United States	
One Little Indian	Bernard McEveety	James Garner, Vera Miles, Pat Hingle, Morgan Woodward, John Doucette, Clay O'Brien, Robert Pine, Jay Silverheels, Jodie Foster, Terry Wilson, Paul Sorensen, Jim Davis	United States	Comedy Western
Pat Garrett and Billy the Kid	Sam Peckinpah	James Coburn, Kris Kristofferson, Richard Jaeckel, Katy Jurado, Chill Wills, Barry Sullivan, Jason Robards, Bob Dylan, R.G. Armstrong, Luke Askew, John Beck, Richard Bright, Matt Clark, Rita Coolidge, Jack Dodson, Jack Elam, Emilio Fernández, Paul Fix, L.Q. Jones, Slim Pickens, Jorge Russek, Charles Martin Smith, Harry Dean Stanton, Claudia Bryar, John Chandler, Aurora Clavel, Rutanya Alda, Rudy Wurlitzer, Elisha Cook Jr., Gene Evans, Donnie Fritts, Dub Taylor, Sam Peckinpah, Bruce Dern	United States	Outlaw Western
Pioneer Woman	Buzz Kulik	Joanna Pettet, William Shatner, David Janssen, Helen Hunt	United States	Made for television movie
The Red Pony	Robert Totten	Henry Fonda, Maureen O'Hara, Ben Johnson, Jack Elam	United States	Made for television movie
Santee	Gary Nelson	Glenn Ford, Michael Burns, Dana Wynter, Jay Silverheels, Harry Townes, John Larch, Robert Wilke, Robert Donner, John Bailey, X Brands, Chuck Courtney, Lindsay Crosby, John Hart, Russ McCubbin, Boyd Morgan	United States	Traditional Western
Showdown	George Seaton	Dean Martin, Rock Hudson, Susan Clark, Donald Moffat, John McLiam, Charles Baca, Jackson Kane, Ben Zeller, John Richard Gill, Philip L. Mead, Rita Rogers, Vic Mohica, Raleigh Gardenhire, Ed Begley Jr., Dan Boydston	United States	Traditional Western
The Soul of Nigger Charley	Larry Spangler	Fred Williamson, D'Urville Martin, Denise Nicholas, Pedro Armendáriz Jr.	United States	Blaxploitation Western
The Train Robbers	Burt Kennedy	John Wayne, Ann-Margret, Rod Taylor, Ben Johnson, Christopher George, Bobby Vinton, Jerry Gatlin, Ricardo Montalbán	United States	Traditional Western
Westworld	Michael Crichton	Yul Brynner, Richard Benjamin, James Brolin, Alan Oppenheimer, Victoria Shaw, Dick Van Patten, Linda Scott, Steve Franken, Michael Mikler, Terry Wilson, Majel Barrett, Anne Randall, Nora Marlowe, Charles Seel	United States	Science fiction Western
1974
Alien Thunder	Claude Fournier	Donald Sutherland, Gordon Tootoosis, Chief Dan George	Canada	Northern Canadian Mountie revisionist Western
Billy Two Hats	Ted Kotcheff	Gregory Peck, Desi Arnaz Jr., Jack Warden, David Huddleston, Sian Barbara Allen, John Pearce, Dawn Little Sky, W. Vincent St. Cyr, Henry Medicine Hat, Zev Berlinsky, Antony Scott, Vic Armstrong	United States; Israel	Traditional Western
Blazing Saddles	Mel Brooks	Cleavon Little, Gene Wilder, Slim Pickens, David Huddleston, Liam Dunn, Alex Karras, John Hillerman, George Furth, Claude Ennis Starrett Jr., Mel Brooks, Harvey Korman, Madeline Kahn, Carol Arthur, Richard Collier, Charles McGregor, Burton Gilliam, Robyn Hilton, Dom DeLuise	United States	Comedy Western
Bring Me the Head of Alfredo Garcia	Sam Peckinpah	Warren Oates, Isela Vega, Robert Webber, Gig Young, Helmut Dantine, Emilio Fernández, Kris Kristofferson, Donnie Fritts	Mexico	Film noir Western
The Castaway Cowboy	Vincent McEveety	James Garner, Vera Miles, Robert Culp, Eric Shea, Manu Tupou, Gregory Sierra, Shug Fisher, Ralph Hanalei, Kim Kahana	United States	Comedy Western
The Godchild	John Badham	Jack Palance, Jack Warden, Keith Carradine, Ed Lauter, Jose Perez, Bill McKinney, Jesse Vint, Fionnuala Flanagan, John Quade, Simon Deckard, Ed Bakey, Kermit Murdock	United States	B Western
The Gun and the Pulpit	Daniel Petrie	Marjoe Gortner, Slim Pickens, David Huddleston, Geoffrey Lewis, Estelle Parsons, Pamela Sue Martin, Jeff Corey, Karl Swenson, Jon Lormer, Robert Phillips, Larry Ward, Joan Goodfellow	United States	Made for television movie/television pilot
The Hanged Man	Michael Caffey	Steve Forrest, Dean Jagger, Will Geer, Sharon Acker, Barbara Luna, Cameron Mitchell, Ray Teal, William Bryant, John Mitchum	United States	Made for television movie/television pilot
Kit & Co	Konrad Petzold	Dean Reed, Rolf Hoppe, Armin Mueller-Stahl	East Germany	Comedy Western
Knife for the Ladies	Larry G. Spangler	Jack Elam, Ruth Roman, Jeff Cooper, John Kellogg, Gene Evans, Diana Ewing, Derek Sanderson, Jon Spangler	United States	Horror Western
The Life and Times of Grizzly Adams	Richard Friedenberg	Dan Haggerty, Denver Pyle, Don Shanks	United States	Adventure Western
The Mark of Zorro	Don McDougall	Frank Langella, Ricardo Montalbán, Gilbert Roland, Yvonne De Carlo, Louise Sorel, Robert Middleton, Anne Archer, Jay Hammer	United States	Made for TV Movie
Mrs. Sundance	Marvin Chomsky	Elizabeth Montgomery, Robert Foxworth, L.Q. Jones, Arthur Hunnicutt, Lurene Tuttle, Claudette Nevins, Lorna Thayer, Robert Donner, Byron Mabe, Dean Smith, Jack Williams, Todd Shelhorse	United States	Made for TV Movie
The Red Badge of Courage	Lee Philips	Richard Thomas, Michael Brandon, Wendell Burton	United States	Made for TV Movie
Return of the Big Cat	Tom Leetch	Jeremy Slate, Pat Crowley, David Wayne	United States	Made for TV Movie
The Spikes Gang	Richard Fleischer	Lee Marvin, Gary Grimes, Charles Martin Smith, Ron Howard, Arthur Hunnicutt, Noah Beery Jr.	United States	Outlaw Western
The Stranger and the Gunfighter	Antonio Margheriti	Lee Van Cleef, Lo Lieh, Femi Benussi	Spain; Italy; Hong Kong; United States	Kung-fu/spaghetti Western
This is the West That Was	Fielder Cook	Ben Murphy, Kim Darby, Jane Alexander	United States	B comedy Western
Ulzana	Gottfried Kolditz	Gojko Mitić, Renate Blume, Colea Răutu	East Germany; Romania	Red Western
Zandy's Bride	Jan Troell	Gene Hackman, Liv Ullmann, Eileen Heckart, Susan Tyrrell, Harry Dean Stanton, Joe Santos, Frank Cady, Sam Bottoms	United States	Revisionist Western
1975
Adiós Amigo	Fred Williamson	Fred Williamson, Richard Pryor	United States	Comedy Western
Against a Crooked Sky	Earl Bellamy	Richard Boone, Stewart Petersen, Henry Wilcoxon, Clint Ritchie, Shannon Farnon, Jewel Blanch, Brenda Venus, Geoffrey Land, Gordon Hanson, Vincent S. Cyr, Margaret Willey	United States	Traditional Western
The Apple Dumpling Gang	Norman Tokar	Bill Bixby, Susan Clark, Don Knotts, Tim Conway, David Wayne, Slim Pickens, Harry Morgan, John McGiver, Don Knight, Clay O'Brien, Brad Savage, Stacy Manning, Dennis Fimple, Pepe Callahan, Iris Adrian, Fran Ryan, Bing Russell, Olan Soule, Dawn Little Sky, Joshua Shelley, Dick Winslow	United States	Comedy Western
Bite the Bullet	Richard Brooks	Gene Hackman, James Coburn, Candice Bergen, Ben Johnson, Ian Bannen, Jan-Michael Vincent, Dabney Coleman, John McLiam, Sally Kirkland, Jerry Gatlin	United States	Action/adventure Western
Blazing Stewardesses	Al Adamson	Yvonne De Carlo, The Ritz Brothers, Don "Red" Barry, Bob Livingston	United States	Sex comedy Western
Blutsbrüder	Werner W. Wallroth	Gojko Mitić, Dean Reed	East Germany	Romance red Western
Boss Nigger	Jack Arnold	Fred Williamson, D'Urville Martin, William Smith	United States	Blaxploitation Western
A Dirty Western	Joseph F. Robertson	Barbara Bourbon, Richard O'Neal, Geoff Parker	United States	Adult (pornographic) Western
Les Filles du Golden Saloon	Gilbert Roussel	Sandra Julien, Evelyne Scott	France	Euro-Western
Four of the Apocalypse	Lucio Fulci	Fabio Testi, Tomas Milian	Italy	Spaghetti Western
Hearts of the West	Howard Zieff	Jeff Bridges, Andy Griffith, Donald Pleasence, Blythe Danner, Alan Arkin, Anthony James, Burton Gilliam, Matt Clark, Marie Windsor, Dub Taylor	United States	Comedy Western
I Will Fight No More Forever	Richard T. Heffron	Ned Romero, Sam Elliott, James Whitmore	United States	Biographical Western
Inn of the Damned	Terry Bourke	Judith Anderson, Alex Cord, Michael Craig	Australia	Horror Western
The Last Day	Vincent McEveety	Richard Widmark, Barbara Rush, Robert Conrad, Richard Jaeckel, Tim Matheson, Christopher Connelly, Tom Skerritt	United States	B Western
Mackintosh and T.J.	Marvin J. Chomsky	Roy Rogers, Clay O'Brien, Billy Green Bush, Andrew Robinson, Joan Hackett, James Hampton, Dennis Fimple, Luke Askew, Walter Barnes, Edith Atwater, Larry Mahan	United States	Contemporary Western
The Master Gunfighter	Tom Laughlin	Tom Laughlin, Ron O'Neal, Barbara Carrera	United States	Traditional Western
Posse	Kirk Douglas	Kirk Douglas, Bruce Dern, Bo Hopkins, James Stacy, Luke Askew, David Canary, Alfonso Arau, Melody Thomas	United States	Traditional Western
Rancho Deluxe	Frank Perry	Jeff Bridges, Sam Waterston, Elizabeth Ashley, Clifton James, Slim Pickens, Charlene Dallas, Harry Dean Stanton, Richard Bright, Patti D'Arbanville, Maggie Wellman, Bert Conway	United States	Comedy Western
Rooster Cogburn	Stuart Millar	John Wayne, Katharine Hepburn, Anthony Zerbe, Richard Jordan, John McIntire, Richard Romancito, Paul Koslo, Strother Martin, Tommy Lee, Jack Colvin, Jon Lormer, Lane Smith, Warren Vanders, Jerry Gatlin, Mickey Gilbert, Chuck Hayward, Gary McLarty, Andrew Prine	United States	Traditional Western
Sally Fieldgood & Co	Boon Collins	Brian Brown, Valerie Ambrose	Canada	B Western
Smoke in the Wind	Andy Brennan/Joseph Kane	John Ashley, Walter Brennan, Myron Healey	United States	B Western
Take a Hard Ride	Anthony Dawson	Lee Van Cleef, Jim Brown, Fred Williamson, Catherine Spaak, Jim Kelly, Barry Sullivan, Harry Carey Jr., Robert Donner, Charles McGregor, Ronald Howard, Buddy Joe Hooker, Dana Andrews	Italy	Spaghetti Western
The True Story of Eskimo Nell	Richard Franklin	Max Gillies, Serge Lazareff, Butcher Vachon	Australia	Comedy Western
The White, the Yellow, and the Black	Sergio Corbucci	Giuliano Gemma, Tomas Milian, Eli Wallach, Manuel de Blas, Jacques Berthier, Romano Puppo, Nazareno Zamperla, Cris Huerta, Gary Wilson	Italy	Comedy/spaghetti Western
Winterhawk	Charles B. Pierce	Leif Erickson, Woody Strode, Denver Pyle, L. Q. Jones, Elisha Cook Jr., Seamon Glass, Dennis Fimple, Arthur Hunnicutt, Dawn Wells, Michael Dante	United States	Traditional Western
Zorro	Duccio Tesari	Alain Delon, Stanley Baker, Ottavia Piccolo	Italy, France	Adventure/comedy/spaghetti Western
1976
The Adventures of Frontier Fremont	Richard Friedenberg	Dan Haggerty, Denver Pyle	United States	Adventure Western
Banjo Hackett: Roamin' Free	Andrew V. McLaglen	Don Meredith, Ike Eisenmann, Chuck Connors, Slim Pickens, Jennifer Warren, Gloria DeHaven, L. Q. Jones, Jeff Corey, Anne Francis, Jeff Morris, John Alderson, Albert Able	United States	B Western
Breakheart Pass	Tom Gries	Charles Bronson, Ben Johnson, Richard Crenna, Jill Ireland, Charles Durning, Ed Lauter, Bill McKinney, David Huddleston, Roy Jenson, Rayford Barnes, Scott Newman, Robert Tessier, Joe Kapp, Archie Moore, Sally Kirkland, Eddie Little Sky, John Mitchum, Read Morgan, Casey Tibbs, Doug Atkins	United States	Mystery Western
Bridger	David Lowell Rich	James Wainwright, Ben Murphy, Dirk Blocker, John Anderson, William Windom, Sally Field	United States	Made for television movie
Buffalo Bill and the Indians, or Sitting Bull's History Lesson	Robert Altman	Paul Newman, Geraldine Chaplin, Burt Lancaster, Kevin McCarthy, Joel Grey, Harvey Keitel, John Considine, Frank Kaquitts, Will Sampson, Pat McCormick, Shelley Duvall, Allan F. Nicholls, Robert DoQui, Evelyn Lear, Bert Remsen, Bonnie Leaders, Noelle Rogers, Denver Pyle, Patrick Reynolds	United States	Revisionist Western
Cipolla Colt	Enzo G. Castellari	Franco Nero, Sterling Hayden, Martin Balsam	Italy	Comedy/spaghetti Western
The Duchess and the Dirtwater Fox	Melvin Frank	George Segal, Goldie Hawn, Conrad Janis, Thayer David, Jennifer Lee, Sid Gould, Pat Ast, E.J. André, Richard Farnsworth, Clifford Turknett, Roy Jenson, Bob Hoy, Bennie Dobbins, Walter Scott, Jerry Gatlin	United States	Romance/comedy Western
From Noon till Three	Frank D. Gilroy	Charles Bronson, Jill Ireland, Douglas Fowley, Stan Haze, Damon Douglas, Hector Morales, Bert Williams, Davis Roberts, Betty Cole, William Lanteau, Larry French, Michael LeClair, Anne Ramsey, Howard Brunner, Don "Red" Barry	United States	Romance/comedy Western
God's Gun	Frank Kramer	Lee van Cleef, Jack Palance, Richard Boone, Sybil Danning, Leif Garrett, Robert Lipton, Cody Palance, Ian Sander, Pnina Rosenblum, Zila Carni, Heinz Bernard, Didi Lukov, Ricardo David, Chin Chin, Rafi Ben Ami	Italy Israel	Spaghetti Western
The Great Scout & Cathouse Thursday	Don Taylor	Lee Marvin, Oliver Reed, Robert Culp, Kay Lenz, Elizabeth Ashley, Strother Martin, Sylvia Miles, Howard Platt, Jac Zacha, Phaedra, Leticia Robles, Luz Maria Pena, Erika Carlson, C.C. Charity, Ana Verdugo	United States	Comedy Western
Guardian of Wilderness	David O'Malley	Denver Pyle, John Dehner	United States	Biographical Western
Hawmps!	Joe Camp	James Hampton, Christopher Connelly, Slim Pickens, Denver Pyle	United States	Comedy historical Western
The Invasion of Johnson County	Jerry Jameson	Bill Bixby, Bo Hopkins, John Hillerman	United States	Made for television movie
Joshua	Larry G. Spangler	Fred Williamson, Brenda Venus	United States	Revenge Western
Keoma	Enzo G. Castellari	Franco Nero, Woody Strode	Italy	Spaghetti Western
The Last Hard Men	Andrew V. McLaglen	Charlton Heston, James Coburn, Barbara Hershey, Jorge Rivero, Michael Parks, Larry Wilcox, Thalmus Rasulala, Morgan Paull, John Quade, Robert Donner, Christopher Mitchum	United States	Traditional Western
Law of the Land	Virgil W. Vogel	Jim Davis, Don Johnson, Cal Bellini, Nicholas Hammond, Darleen Carr, Barbara Parkins, Moses Gunn, Andrew Prine, Glenn Corbett, James McMullan, Charlie Martin Smith, Dana Elcar, James Griffith, Grainger Hines	United States	B Western
Mad Dog Morgan	Philippe Mora	Dennis Hopper, Jack Thompson, David Gulpilil, Frank Thring, Michael Pate, Wallas Eaton, Bill Hunter, John Hargreaves, Graeme Blundell, Gregory Apps, Liddy Clark, Peter Collingwood, Peter Cummins, John Derum, Gerry Duggan, Robert McDarra	Australia	Australian Western
The Missouri Breaks	Arthur Penn	Marlon Brando, Jack Nicholson, Randy Quaid, Frederic Forrest, Harry Dean Stanton, John McLiam, Kathleen Lloyd, John Ryan, Sam Gilman, Steve Franken, Richard Bradford, James Greene, Luana Anders, Danny Goldman, Hunter von Leer	United States	Revisionist Western
Mustang Country	John C. Champion	Joel McCrea, Robert Fuller, Patrick Wayne, Nika Mina	United States	Traditional Western
The New Daughters of Joshua Cabe	Bruce Bilson	John McIntire, Jack Elam	United States	B comedy Western
The Outlaw Josey Wales	Clint Eastwood	Clint Eastwood, Chief Dan George, Sondra Locke, Bill McKinney, John Vernon, Paula Trueman, Sam Bottoms, Charles Tyner, Geraldine Keams, Woodrow Parfrey, Joyce Jameson, Sheb Wooley, Royal Dano, Matt Clark, Will Sampson, John Quade, John Russell, William O'Connell, Richard Farnsworth	United States	Outlaw/revisionist Western
The Return of a Man Called Horse	Irvin Kershner	Richard Harris, Gale Sondergaard, Geoffrey Lewis, Bill Lucking, Jorge Luke, Jorge Russek, Claudio Brook, Enrique Lucero, Regino Herrera, Pedro Damián, Humberto López, Alberto Mariscal, Eugenia Dolores, Patricia Reyes Spíndola, Ana De Sade	United States	Revisionist Western
The Shootist	Don Siegel	John Wayne, Lauren Bacall, Ron Howard, James Stewart, Richard Boone, Hugh O'Brian, Harry Morgan, John Carradine, Sheree North, Scatman Crothers, Bill McKinney, Gregg Palmer	United States	Traditional Western; John Wayne's final film
Treasure of Matecumbe	Vincent McEveety	Robert Foxworth, Joan Hackett, Peter Ustinov, Vic Morrow, Johnny Doran, Billy Attmore, Jane Wyatt, Virginia Vincent, Robert DoQui, Don Knight	United States	Adventure Western
Viva Zalata	Hassan Hafez	Fouad El-Mohandes, Shwikar, Sameer Ghanem	Egypt	Comedy Western
Wanted: The Sundance Woman	Lee Philips	Katharine Ross, Steve Forrest, Stella Stevens, Michael Constantine, Katherine Helmond, Hector Elizondo, Warren Berlinger, Hector Elias, Robert Symonds, Redmond M. Gleeson, Lucille Benson, Eric Server, Sanford Gibbons	United States	Made for TV Movie
The Winds of Autumn	Charles B. Pierce	Jack Elam, Jeanette Nolan, Andrew Prine, Earl E. Smith, Chuck Pierce Jr., Jimmy Clem, Belinda Palmer, Perry Harris, Robert Birchall, Joyce Workman, Charles B. Pierce, Cheri Johnson, Dub Taylor, Lisa Baker, Ann Pennington, Martha Smith, Laura Love	United States	Adventure Western
1977
Another Man, Another Chance	Claude Lelouch	James Caan, Geneviève Bujold, Francis Huster, Susan Tyrrell, Jennifer Warren, Rossie Harris, Linda Lee Lyons, Jacques Villeret, Fred Stuthman, Diana Douglas, Michael Berryman, Dick Farnsworth, Robert Tessier, Walter Barnes, Bernard Behrens, Oliver Clark, Burton Gilliam, Rance Howard, Scott Walker, Jack Ging, Christopher Lloyd, Vincent Schiavelli	France	Euro-Western
Charlie Cobb: Nice Night for a Hanging	Richard Michaels	Clu Gulager, Ralph Bellamy, Blair Brown, Christopher Connelly, George Furth, Carmen Mathews, Tricia O'Neil, Pernell Roberts, Stella Stevens, Josh Taylor, Ted Chapman, Wallace Rooney, Madison Arnold, Bob Neill, Jack Garner, Peter Looney	United States	Made for television movie
Grayeagle	Charles B. Pierce	Ben Johnson, Iron Eyes Cody, Lana Wood, Jack Elam, Paul Fix, Alex Cord, Jacob Daniels, Jimmy Clem, Cindy Butler, Charles B. Pierce	United States	Family Western
Kid Vengeance	Joseph Manduke	Lee Van Cleef, Jim Brown	United States; Italy; Israel	B Western
Kit Carson and the Mountain Men		Christopher Connelly, Robert Reed, Gary Lockwood	United States	Family Western
The Legend of Frank Woods	Deno Paoli, Hagen Smith	Hagen Smith, Troy Donahue	United States; Italy	B Western
A Man Called Blade	Sergio Mantino	Maurizio Merli	Italy	Spaghetti Western
Ransom for Alice!	David Lowell Rich	Gil Gerard, Yvette Mimieux, Charles Napier, Laurie Prange, Barnard Hughes, Gavin MacLeod, Gene Barry, Harris Yulin, Mills Watson, Anthony James	United States	Made for television movie
Raw Deal	Russell Hugg	Gerard Kennedy, Gus Mercurio, Rod Mullinar, Christopher Pate, Hu Pryce, John Cousins, Michael Carman, Norman Yemm, Gary Day, Briony Behets	Australia	Outback Western
The Shadow of Chikara	Earl E. Smith	Joe Don Baker, Sondra Locke, Ted Neeley, Dennis Fimple, John Davis Chandler, Linda Dano, Slim Pickens	United States	Horror Western
Welcome to Blood City	Peter Sasdy	Jack Palance, Keir Dullea, Samantha Eggar, Barry Morse, Hollis McLaren, Chris Wiggins	Canada	Science fiction Western
The White Buffalo	J. Lee Thompson	Charles Bronson, Will Sampson, Jack Warden, Slim Pickens, Clint Walker, Stuart Whitman, John Carradine, Kim Novak, Clifford A. Pellow	United States	Fantasy Western
1978
La Ballade des Dalton	René Goscinny, Henri Gruel	Roger Carel, Georges Atlas, Daniel Ceccaldi	France	Animated Euro-Western
The Chant of Jimmie Blacksmith	Fred Schepisi	Tom E. Lewis, Angela Punch	Australia	Australian Western
China 9, Liberty 37	Monte Hellman	Warren Oates, Jenny Agutter, Fabio Testi, Sam Peckinpah, Isabel Mestres, Gianrico Tondinelli, Franco Interlenghi, Charly Bravo, Sydney Lassick, Richard C. Adams, Romano Puppo, Luis Prendes, Helga Liné, Mattieu Ettori, Daniel Panes, Tony Brandt, Luis Barboo	Italy	Spaghetti Western
Comes a Horseman	Alan J. Pakula	James Caan, Jane Fonda, Jason Robards, George Grizzard, Richard Farnsworth, Jim Davis, Mark Harmon, Macon McCalman, Basil Hoffman, James Kline, James Keach, Clifford A. Pellow	United States	Contemporary Western
Desperate Women	Earl Bellamy	Ronee Blakley, John Crawford, Michael Delano	United States	B Western
Donner Pass: The Road to Survival	James L. Conway	Robert Fuller, Andrew Prine, Michael Callan, Diane McBain, John Anderson, John Doucette, Cynthia Eilbacher, Royal Dano, Gregory Walcott, Lance Le Gault, Whit Bissell, Peg Stewart	United States	B Western
Go West, Young Girl	Alan J. Levi	Karen Valentine, Sandra Will, Stuart Whitman, Richard Jaeckel, Michael Bell, Cal Bellini, David Dukes, Charles Frank, Richard Kelton, William Larsen, John Quade, Greg Palmer	United States	Comedy Western
Goin' South	Jack Nicholson	Jack Nicholson, Mary Steenburgen, Christopher Lloyd, John Belushi, Richard Bradford, Veronica Cartwright, Jeff Morris, Danny DeVito, Tracey Walter, Luana Anders, Lucy Lee Flippin, Ed Begley Jr.	United States	Comedy Western
Hot Lead and Cold Feet	Robert Butler	Jim Dale, Karen Valentine, Don Knotts, Darren McGavin, Jack Elam, Dallas McKennon, John Williams, Warren Vanders, Michael Sharrett, Don "Red" Barry, Gregg Palmer, Ed Bakey, John Steadman, Eric Server, Paul Lukather, Stanley Clements, Don Brodie, Jack Bender, Brad Weston	United States	Comedy Western
The New Maverick	Hy Averback	James Garner, Charles Frank, Jack Kelly, Susan Sullivan, Susan Blanchard, Eugene Roche, George Loros, Woodrow Parfrey, Greg Allen, Helen Page Camp, Jack Garner, Graham Jarvis, Macon McCalman, B.J. Ward	United States	B Western (based on the Maverick TV series)
Profetul, aurul şi ardelenii	Dan Piţa	Mircea Diaconu, Ilarion Ciobanu, Ovidiu Iuliu Moldovan, Victor Rebengiuc	Romania	Comedy western
Shoot the Sun Down	David Leeds	Christopher Walken, Margot Kidder, Geoffrey Lewis, Bo Brundin, A Martinez, Sacheen Littlefeather	United States	Traditional Western
Silver Saddle	Lucio Fulci	Giuliano Gemma, Donald O'Brien, Geoffrey Lewis, Gianni De Luigi, Licinia Lentini, Sven Valsecchi, Cinzia Monreale, Ettore Manni, Aldo Sambrell, Philippe Hersent	Italy	Spaghetti Western
True Grit: A Further Adventure	Richard T. Heffron	Warren Oates, Lisa Pelikan, Lee Meriwether, James Stephens, Jeff Osterhage, Lee Montgomery, Ramon Bieri, Jack Fletcher, Parley Baer, Lee de Broux, Fredric Cook, Redmond Gleeson, Gregg Palmer, Roger Frazier, Don Spencer, Burt Douglas, Richard McKenzie	United States	Traditional Western
Wild and Wooly	Philip Leacock	Susan Bigelow, Elyssa Davalos, Doug McClure, David Doyle, Ross Martin, Vic Morrow, Paul Burke, Jessica Walter, Charles Siebert, Sherry Bain	United States	Comedy Western
1979
The Apple Dumpling Gang Rides Again	Vincent McEveety	Tim Conway, Don Knotts, Tim Matheson, Kenneth Mars, Elyssa Davalos, Jack Elam, Robert Pine, Harry Morgan, Ruth Buzzi, Audrey Totter, Richard X. Slattery, John Crawford, Ralph Manza, Cliff Osmond, Ted Gehring, Morgan Paull, Gary McLarty, Shug Fisher, Roger Mobley, Stu Gilliam, A.J. Bakunas, David S. Cass Sr., George Chandler, Jack Perkins, Art Evans	United States	Comedy Western
Artista, dolarii şi ardelenii	Dan Piţa	Mircea Diaconu, Ilarion Ciobanu, Ovidiu Iuliu Moldovan, Rodica Tapalagă, Mircea Albulescu	Romania	Comedy Western
Butch and Sundance: The Early Days	Richard Lester	Tom Berenger, William Katt, Jeff Corey, John Schuck, Michael C. Gwynne, Peter Weller, Brian Dennehy, Christopher Lloyd, Jill Eikenberry, Vincent Schiavelli, Hugh Gillin	United States	Traditional Western
Eagle's Wing	Anthony Harvey	Martin Sheen, Sam Waterston, Harvey Keitel, Stephane Audran, John Castle, Caroline Langrishe, Jorge Russek, Manuel Ojeda, Jorge Luke, Pedro Damian, Claudio Brook, José Carlos Ruiz, Farnesio de Bernal, Cecilia Camacho, Enrique Lucero	United Kingdom	Euro-Western
The Electric Horseman	Sydney Pollack	Robert Redford, Jane Fonda, Willie Nelson, Valerie Perrine, John Saxon, Nicolas Coster, Allan Arbus, Wilford Brimley, Will Hare, Basil Hoffman, Timothy Scott, James B. Sikking, James Kline, Sarah Harris	United States	Contemporary romantic Western
The Frisco Kid	Robert Aldrich	Gene Wilder, Harrison Ford, Ramon Bieri, Val Bisoglio, George Ralph DiCenzo, Leo Fuchs, Penny Peyser, William Smith, Shay Duffin, Frank De Vol, Joe Kapp, Clyde Kusatsu, Vincent Schiavelli	United States	Comedy Western
Heartland	Richard Pearce	Rip Torn, Conchata Ferrell, Barry Primus, Megan Folsom, Lilia Skala, Amy Wright, Jerry Hardin, Mary Boylan, Jeff Boschee, Robert Overholzer, Bob Sirucek, Marvin Berg, Gary Voldseth, Mike Robertson, Doug Johnson	United States	Revisionist Western
The Last Ride of the Dalton Gang	Dan Curtis	Cliff Potts, Randy Quaid, Larry Wilcox, Sharon Farrell, Matt Clark, Royal Dano, Bo Hopkins, R.G. Armstrong, Don Collier, Dale Robertson, Jack Palance	United States	Outlaw Western
The Legend of the Golden Gun	Alan J. Levi	Jeff Osterhage, Carl Franklin, Robert Davi, Keir Dullea, Michele Carey, John McLiam, Elissa Leeds, R.G. Armstrong, Hal Holbrook, William Bryant, Rex Holman	United States	B fantasy Western
Mr. Horn	Jack Starrett	David Carradine, Richard Widmark, Karen Black, Richard Masur, Clay Tanner, Pat McCormick, Jack Starrett, John Durren, Jeremy Slate, Enrique Lucero, Stafford Morgan, Don Collier, James Oliver	United States	Biographical Western
The Sacketts	Robert Totten	Sam Elliott, Tom Selleck, Glenn Ford, Ben Johnson, Jeff Osterhage, Gilbert Roland, John Vernon, Ruth Roman, Jack Elam, Gene Evans, L.Q. Jones, Paul Koslo, Mercedes McCambridge, Slim Pickens, Buck Taylor, Pat Buttram, Shug Fisher, James Gammon, Don Collier	United States	Traditional Western
Sweet Savage	Ann Perry	Carol Connors, Aldo Ray, Beth Anna	United States	Adult (pornographic) Western
Up River	Carl Kitt	Morgan Stevens, Jeff Corey	United States	B Western
The Villain	Hal Needham	Kirk Douglas, Ann-Margret, Arnold Schwarzenegger, Paul Lynde, Strother Martin, Jack Elam, Mel Tillis, Ruth Buzzi, Foster Brooks	United States	Comedy Western
Wanda Nevada	Peter Fonda	Peter Fonda, Brooke Shields, Fiona Lewis, Luke Askew, Ted Markland, Severn Darden, Paul Fix, Henry Fonda	United States	Comedy Western
The Wild Wild West Revisited	Burt Kennedy	Robert Conrad, Ross Martin, Paul Williams, Harry Morgan, Jo Ann Harris, Trisha Noble, Jeff MacKay, Susan Blu, Robert Shields, Lorene Yarnell, René Auberjonois, Wilford Brimley	United States	Science fiction Western (based on The Wild Wild West TV series)

== See also ==
- List of Western television series
