= Dean Paul Martin =

American actor and singer (1951–1987)

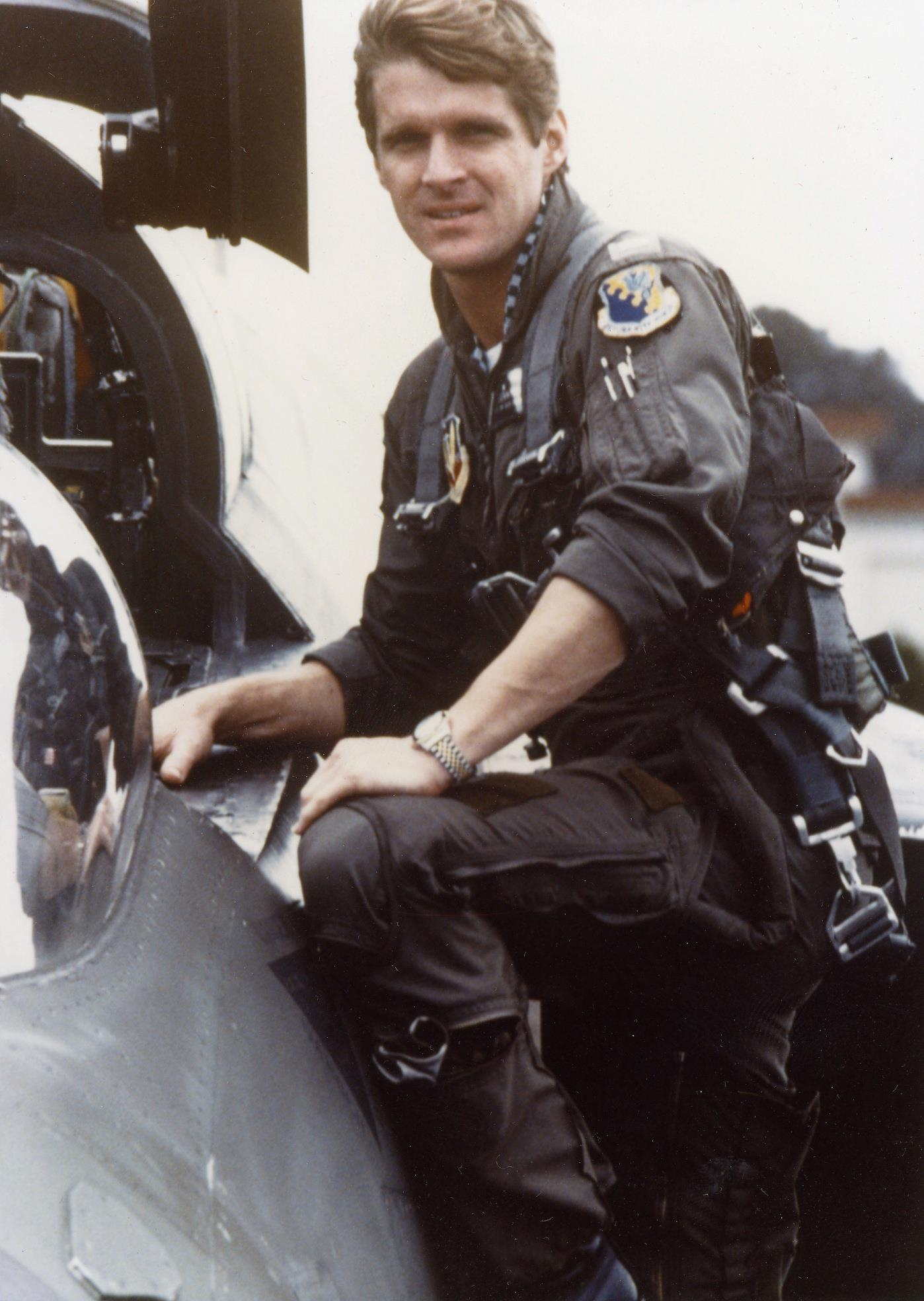
- Capt. Dean Paul Martin on a USAF F-4 Phantom II
- Born: Dino Paul Crocetti Jr. November 17, 1951; Santa Monica, California, U.S.
- Died: March 21, 1987 (aged 35); San Gorgonio Mountain, California, U.S.
- Cause of death: Military aircraft crash
- Resting place: Los Angeles National Cemetery
- Years active: 1966–1987
- Spouses: Olivia Hussey (m. 1971; div. 1978) Dorothy Hamill (m. 1982; div. 1984)
- Children: 1
- Father: Dean Martin
- Relatives: Ricci Martin (brother); Deana Martin (half-sister)

Military service
- Allegiance: United States
- Branch/service: California Air National Guard
- Years of service: 1980–1987
- Rank: Captain
- Unit: 196th Tactical Fighter Squadron

Dean Paul Martin Jr. (born Dino Paul Crocetti Jr.; November 17, 1951 – March 21, 1987) was an American pop singer and film and television actor. A member of the California Air National Guard, Martin died in a crash during a military training flight. He was the son of entertainer Dean Martin.

== Early life ==
Martin's parents were the singer and entertainer Dean Martin and his second wife, Jeanne Biegger. Dean Paul was the fifth of Dean Martin's eight children and Jeanne's eldest son. He attended the Urban Military Academy in Brentwood, California. As a youth, he was encouraged toward a singing career.

== Career ==
=== Music ===
At age 13, he joined Desi Arnaz Jr. and Billy Hinsche in the pop group Dino, Desi & Billy, which had a few minor hits in the US in 1965, entering the Billboard U.S. top 30 twice with "I'm a Fool" (#17) and "Not the Lovin' Kind" (#25).

=== Tennis ===
Martin began to go by his given name of Dean Paul instead of the nickname "Dino" in his late teens. He became a successful tennis player who competed in the qualifying competition for Wimbledon.

=== Acting ===
He co-starred with Ali MacGraw in the 1979 film Players, playing a professional tennis player, for which he was nominated for a Golden Globe Award as New Star of the Year – Actor. He later starred in the TV series Misfits of Science, broadcast during the 1985–1986 television season. The series co-starred Courteney Cox.

His final film appearance was in Backfire, co-starring Karen Allen and Keith Carradine, released in 1988 after Martin's death. The film was dedicated to his memory.

=== Aviation ===
Martin, an avid pilot, obtained his pilot's license at age 16 and became an officer in the California Air National Guard in 1980. He entered active duty for officer training in the U.S. Air Force under the Palace Chase program (permitting direct entry into the Air National Guard or Air Force Reserve), was commissioned as a second lieutenant and completed pilot training at Columbus AFB, Mississippi, in 1981. Following transition training in the F-4 Phantom II jet fighter at Homestead AFB, Florida, in the 308th Tactical Fighter Squadron, he was assigned to the California Air National Guard's 196th Tactical Fighter Squadron, 163rd Tactical Fighter Group at March AFB, California, flying the F-4C Phantom II as a part-time Air National Guardsman. He eventually rose to the rank of captain.

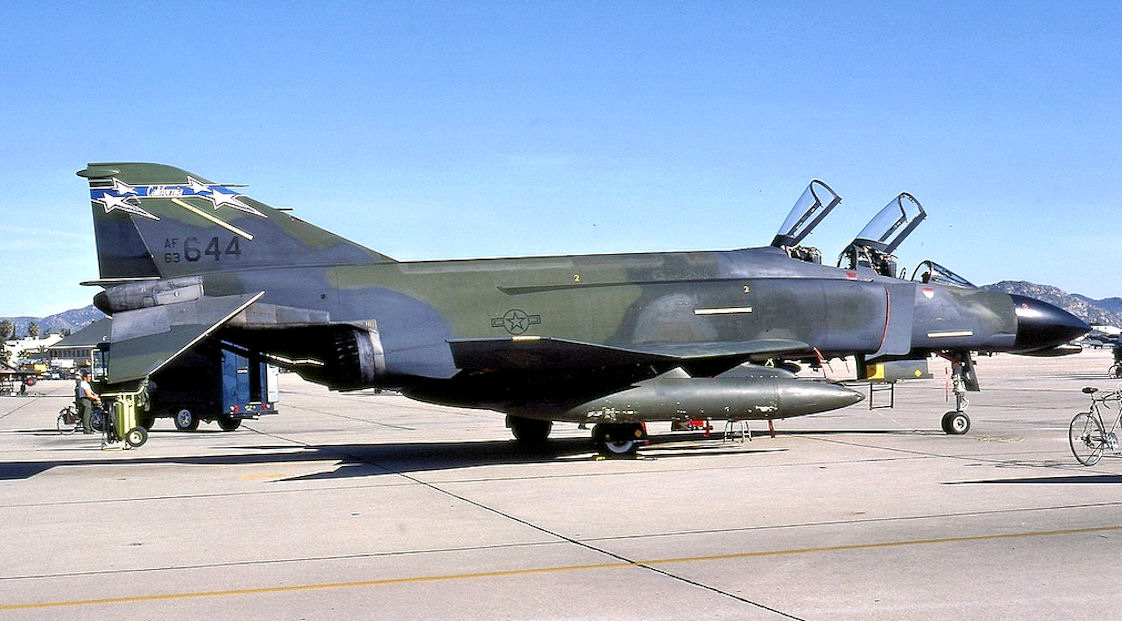
196th TFS F-4C, AF Ser. No. 63-7644, identical to the type of aircraft Martin was flying when he crashed. This particular aircraft is now on static display at Arnold AFB, Tennessee.

== Death ==
During a March 21, 1987, training mission from March AFB, Martin's F-4 jet crashed in California's San Bernardino Mountains during a snowstorm, killing him and his weapons systems officer, Captain Ramon Ortiz. Martin was 35 years old. Officials stated that Martin's jet plunged approximately 4,000 feet from its last radar altitude reading of 9,300 feet and hit the side of the mountain at approximately 400 miles per hour. The plane's wreckage was found on the east side of Wood Canyon in Riverside County. Per reports from Air National Guard and the Air Force, Martin may have experienced vertigo in a snowstorm and did not hear the command from the Ontario Airport controller to change directions to avoid the mountain peak.

His remains were interred at the Los Angeles National Cemetery, a U.S. Department of Veterans Affairs cemetery, in Los Angeles, California.

== Awards and decorations ==
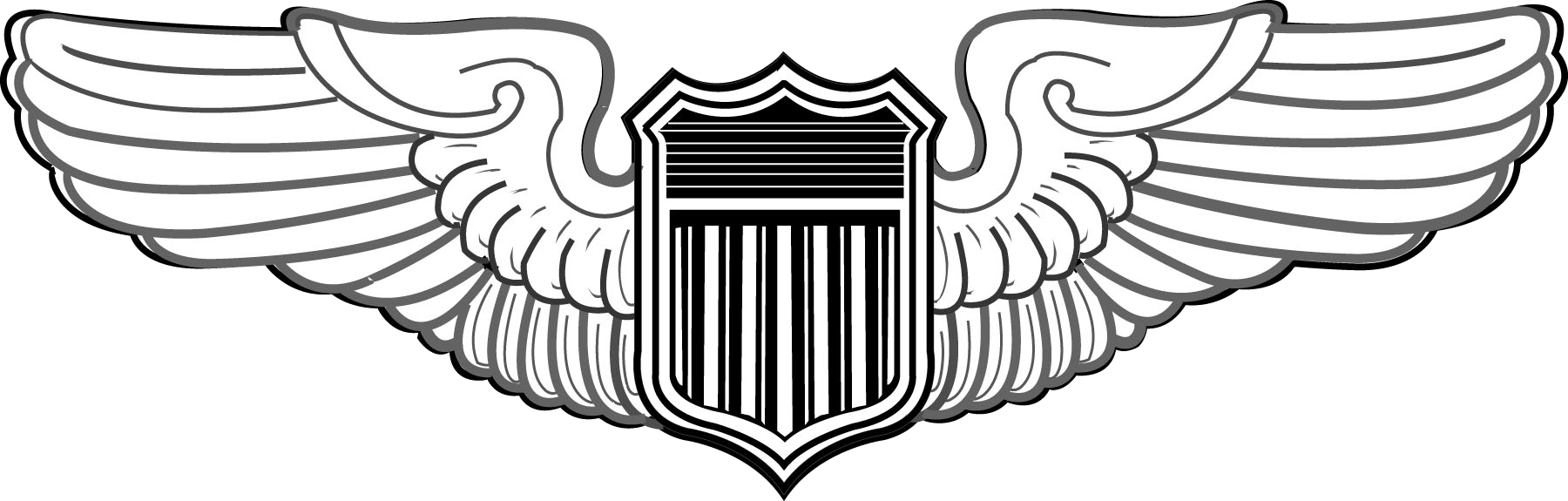

USAF Pilot Badge
Air and Space Organizational Excellence Award with one bronze oak leaf cluster		Combat Readiness Medal
US Air Force Small Arms Ribbon	Air and Space Training Ribbon	California Drill Attendance Ribbon

== Personal life ==
Martin married the actress Olivia Hussey in 1971. The marriage produced one child. The couple divorced in 1978. He married the Olympic gold medalist ice skater Dorothy Hamill in 1982. They divorced in 1984. Martin also dated Candice Bergen and Tina Sinatra.

In 1974, Martin was arrested on federal firearms charges for possession of unregistered machine guns and an anti-tank cannon after he sold two of the machine guns to an undercover ATF agent. He pleaded guilty, was fined $2,000, and received probation for one year.
