= Dino, Desi & Billy =

American singing trio

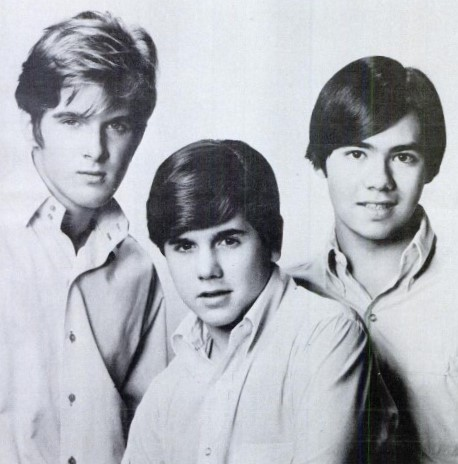
- Dino, Desi & Billy

Background information
- Origin: USA
- Genres: Rock; pop
- Years active: 1964–1969, 1998–2010
- Labels: Reprise; Columbia Records
- Past members: Dean Paul Martin; Desi Arnaz Jr.; Billy Hinsche; Ricci Martin

Dino, Desi & Billy were an American singing trio that existed between 1964 and 1969. The group featured Dean "Dino" Martin (Dean Paul Martin, the son of singer and actor Dean Martin), Desi Arnaz Jr. (Desiderio Arnaz IV, the son of television stars Desi Arnaz and Lucille Ball), and their close friend Billy Hinsche. A reconstituted version of the group performed between 1998 and 2010 as a tribute band after Martin's death in 1987.

== History ==
Dino Martin, Desi Arnaz Jr. and Billy Hinsche first met in grammar school. Due to the family connections of Dino and Desi, the band's first audition was for Frank Sinatra, who founded and still had an interest in Reprise Records, the recording label for Dean Martin. Though Arnaz, whose father was a famous drummer and who had learned to play drums from close family friend Richard Keith (who played Little Ricky on I Love Lucy) was a skilled drummer in his own right, the group did not play their own instruments on most of their records, instead using top session players, producers and songwriters. Producers included Lee Hazlewood, Billy Strange and Jimmy Bowen. Songwriters whose compositions were recorded by the group included Hazlewood, Red West, David Gates, Boyce and Hart, Clint Ballard Jr. and Bonner & Gordon.

Dino, Desi & Billy's best known songs were "I'm a Fool" (1965; U.S. Billboard Hot 100 No. 17; later covered by Alvin and the Chipmunks for their 1965 album Chipmunks à Go-Go) and "Not the Lovin' Kind" (1965; U.S. No. 25). Both were hits for the group before any group member had reached the age of 15. Following this success, in 1965, they toured as an opening act for the Beach Boys. The group also opened for Paul Revere & the Raiders, Tommy Roe, Sam the Sham, the Lovin' Spoonful and the Mamas & the Papas.

The band did not have a top 40 hit after 1965, despite releasing records for five years thereafter.

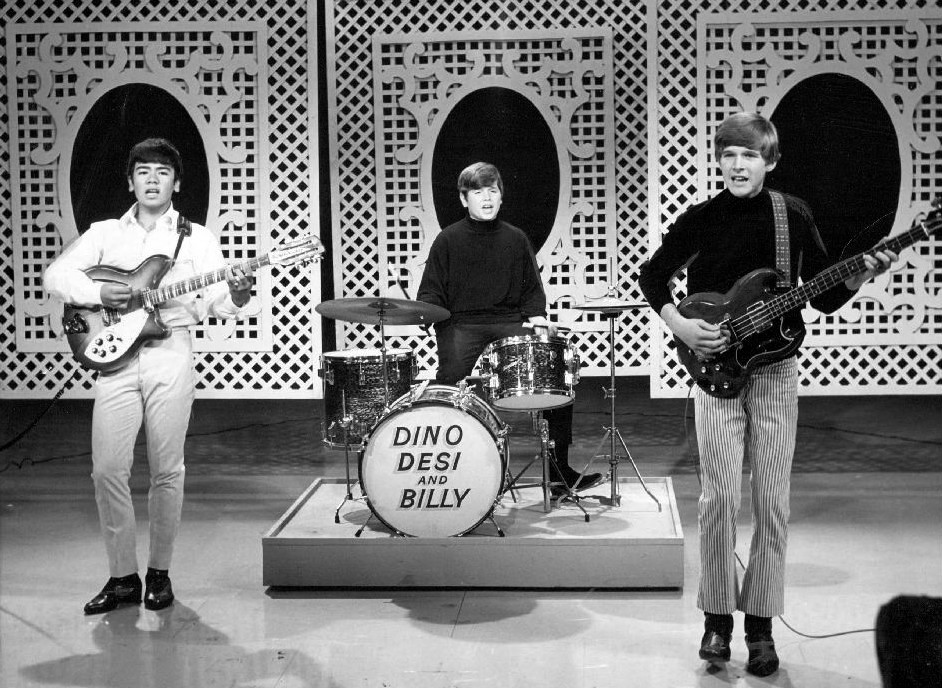
L-R: Billy Hinsche, Desi Arnaz Jr., and Dean Paul Martin, on The Dean Martin Show (1965).

The group released one album in 1965 and three albums in 1966. Dino, Desi & Billy albums contained primarily versions of Top 40 songs made popular by others, with new content being minor. The band made an appearance in the Dean Martin film Murderers' Row, where they sang the Boyce & Hart song, "If You're Thinkin' What I'm Thinkin'". From 1966 to 1970, the group continued to release singles, encountering marginal success, which was not altered by a change of label to Columbia Records in 1969. Also in 1969, the group contributed three songs to the soundtrack of the surf film Follow Me. The group received top billing on the soundtrack album, despite the fact that most of the album featured music by composer Stu Phillips. Later in 1969 the group broke up, due in part to Desi joining his mother Lucille Ball's television show and Hinsche wishing to commence university studies.

The group was never a favorite of the critics. Writing for AllMusic, music critic Richie Unterberger characterized them as a group that "never had an ounce of credibility", with music that was "innocuously bland in the extreme." These sentiments may be contrasted with the fact that the band was well thought of by the Beach Boys, to the extent that Brian Wilson and Hinsche co-wrote one of the band's original songs, and their final single, "Lady Love". That single was released by Reprise Records in 1970, after the group had broken up. Hinsche's sister, Annie, married Carl Wilson and Hinsche himself worked with the Beach Boys as a backing musician for many years.

Dean Paul Martin became a tennis player, an actor, and a captain in the California Air National Guard. He first married actress Olivia Hussey and later figure skater Dorothy Hamill, and he was killed while piloting an F-4 Phantom jet on a training mission in 1987.

In 1996, Sundazed Music released The Rebel Kind: The Best of Dino, Desi & Billy, in which all of the group's singles and other non-cover material was collected for the first time on one album.

From 1998 to 2010, a reconfiguration of the group, known as "Ricci, Desi, & Billy", performed at various times, in addition to releasing two live albums. The band performed new material and the original hits, with Ricci Martin, the youngest son of singer Dean Martin, replacing his late older brother, Dean Paul Martin.

Billy Hinsche died of lung cancer on November 20, 2021, after a short illness. His mother, Celia Hinsche, also died on the same day.

=== See also ===
Gary Lewis & the Playboys were a contemporary group founded and led by Gary Lewis, the son of Dean Martin's erstwhile comedy partner Jerry Lewis. With a sound likewise influenced by the British Invasion, their version of "This Diamond Ring" reached No. 1 in February 1965.

== Discography ==
=== Singles ===
- "Since You Broke My Heart" / "We Know" — Reprise 0324 — released November 1964
- "I'm A Fool" / "So Many Ways" — Reprise 0367 – May 1965 (No. 17 U.S., No. 23 CAN)
- "I'm A Fool" / "So Many Ways" / "Since You Broke My Heart" / "We Know" — Reprise 60072 ep (France) – May 1965
- "Not The Lovin' Kind" / "Chimes of Freedom" — Reprise 0401 – September 1965 (No. 25 U.S., No. 15 Canada)
- "Please Don't Fight It" / "The Rebel Kind" — Reprise 0426 – November 1965 (No. 25 Canada)
- "Superman" / "I Can't Get Her Off My Mind" — Reprise 0444 – February 1966 (No. 94 U.S., No. 15 Canada)
- "Tie Me Down" / "It's Just The Way You Are" — Reprise 0462 – April 1966
- "Look Out Girls (Here We Come)" / "She's So Far Out She's In" — Reprise 0469 – July 1966
- "I Hope She's There Tonight" / "Josephine" — Reprise 0529 – November 1966
- "If You're Thinkin' What I'm Thinkin'" / "Pretty Flamingo" — Reprise 0544 – January 1967 (No. 128 U.S., No. 2 CAN)
- "Two in the Afternoon" / "Good Luck, Best Wishes to You" — Reprise 0579 – April 1967 (No. 99 U.S., No. 5 CAN)
- "Kitty Doyle" / "Without Hurtin' Some" — Reprise 0619 – August 1967 (No. 108 U.S.)
- "My What a Shame" / "The Inside Outside Caspar Milquetoast Eskimo Flash" — Reprise 0653 – January 1968
- "Tell Someone You Love Them" / "General Outline" — Reprise 0698 – June 1968 (No. 92 U.S., No. 67 Canada)
- "Thru Spray Colored Glasses" / "Someday" — Uni 55127 – April 1969
- "Hawley" / "Let's Talk it Over" — Columbia 4-44975 – August 1969
- "Lady Love" / "A Certain Sound" — Reprise 0965 – November 1970

=== Albums ===
- I'm a Fool — Reprise R (Mono)/RS (Stereo) 6176 — U.S. No. 51, September 1965
- Our Time's Coming — Reprise R/RS 6194 — U.S. No. 119, February 1966
- Memories Are Made of This — Reprise R/RS 6198 – 1966
- Souvenir — Reprise R/RS 6224 – 1966
- Follow Me Original Soundtrack — Uni 73056 – 1969 – Three songs sung by Dino, Desi & Billy, "Thru Spray Colored Glasses" (co-written by Stu Phillips and David Gates), "Like The Wind And Sea" (co-written by Phillips and Ronnie Franklin) and "Just Lookin' For Someone" (co-written by Phillips and Gates)
- The Rebel Kind: The Best of Dino, Desi & Billy — Sundazed, 1996
