= Ricci Martin =

American musical artist (1953–2016)

- Born: September 20, 1953; Beverly Hills, California, U.S.
- Died: August 3, 2016 (aged 62) Salt Lake City, Utah, U.S.
- Occupations: Musician, singer
- Years active: 1977–2016
- Formerly of: Dean Martin; The Pack; The Beach Boys

Ricci James Martin (born Ricci Crocetti; September 20, 1953 – August 3, 2016) was an American musician and singer and one of Dean Martin's sons. He established a band called The Pack. In 1977, he released the album Beached in collaboration with The Beach Boys member Carl Wilson and toured in the United States and Canada as the band's opening act. Wilson later became Ricci's brother-in-law when he married Ricci's sister, Gina Martin.

He moved to Utah in 1990 and later joined the trio Ricci, Desi & Billy; it was a latter-day version of Dino, Desi & Billy. The act had previously included his brother Dean Paul Martin, who died in a plane crash in 1987. In 2002, Martin published That's Amore: A Son Remembers, reflecting on his relationship with his father Dean Martin.

For almost ten years of his musical career, he was a performer in the show His Son Remembers: Dean Martin's Music and More, a tribute show to his father.

Ricci's mother was Dean's second wife Jeanne Biegger. He was the sixth of his father's eight children. Ricci Martin was married to Annie Rassmussen. They divorced in 1992. They had three daughters: Pepper, Montana and Rio. Martin died on August 3, 2016, at age 62, of an undisclosed cause. His mother died three weeks later.

In 2022, Ricci's daughter Pepper came in third place on the first season of reality television series Claim to Fame.

== Bibliography ==
- Martin, Ricci; Smith, Christopher (2002). That's Amore: A Son Remembers Dean Martin. Lanham, Maryland: Rowman & Littlefield. ISBN 978-1-58979-140-4.
