= Backfire (1988 film) =

- Theatrical release poster
- Directed by: Gilbert Cates
- Written by: Larry Brand; Rebecca Reynolds
- Produced by: Danton Rissner
- Starring: Karen Allen; Keith Carradine; Jeff Fahey; Bernie Casey; Dean Paul Martin
- Cinematography: Tak Fujimoto
- Edited by: Melvin Shapiro
- Music by: David Shire
- Distributed by: ITC Entertainment
- Release date: June 21, 1988
- Running time: 90 minutes
- Countries: United States; Canada
- Language: English

Backfire is a 1988 mystery-thriller film about a murderous love triangle which forms between an affluent Vietnam War veteran, his wife, and another man. The film was directed by Gilbert Cates, and stars Karen Allen, Keith Carradine, Dean Paul Martin and Jeff Fahey. The film is dedicated to Martin, who died in a plane crash before the film was released.

Filmed in 1987 and planned to be released to theatres, it instead premiered on Showtime in June 1989. Los Angeles Times critic Chris Willman stated: "cable seems like just the right resting place for such a dully salacious effort."

== Plot ==
Mara is married to Vietnam veteran Donny, who has horrible visions and nightmares of his combat experiences. She is having an affair with Jake. The lives of all are disrupted when she meets a mysterious stranger, Reed, who became her new lover.

== Cast ==
- Keith Carradine as Reed
- Karen Allen as Mara McAndrew
- Jeff Fahey as Donny McAndrew
- Dean Paul Martin as Jake
- Bernie Casey as Clinton
- Dinah Manoff as Jill Tyson
