= Quark (TV series) =

1977 American science fiction sitcom

- Richard Benjamin and the Barnstable twins
- Created by: Buck Henry
- Starring: Richard Benjamin; Tim Thomerson; Richard Kelton; Tricia Barnstable Cyb Barnstable: Conrad Janis; Alan Caillou; Bobby Porter
- Composer: Perry Botkin Jr.
- Country of origin: United States
- Original language: English
- No. of seasons: 1
- No. of episodes: 8

Production
- Executive producers: David Gerber; Mace Neufeld
- Running time: 30 minutes
- Production companies: David Gerber Productions; Columbia Pictures Television; Executive Story Editor

Original release
- Network: NBC
- Release: May 7, 1977 – April 7, 1978

Quark is a 1977 American science fiction sitcom starring Richard Benjamin. Broadcast on Friday nights at 8:00–8:30 p.m. on NBC, the pilot aired on May 7, 1977, and the series followed as a mid-season replacement in February 1978. The series was cancelled in April 1978. Quark was created by Buck Henry, co-creator of the spy spoof Get Smart.

== Plot ==
The show was set on a United Galaxy Sanitation Patrol Cruiser, an interstellar garbage scow operating out of United Galaxy Space Station Perma One in the year 2226. Adam Quark, the main character, works to clean up trash in space by collecting "space baggies" with his trusted and highly unusual crew.

Quark draws heavily from Star Trek as a source of parody. In its short run, specific episodes also satirized such science fiction as Star Wars, 2001: A Space Odyssey, Buck Rogers, and Flash Gordon. Three of the episodes were direct parodies of Star Trek episodes.

== Characters ==
- Adam Quark (Richard Benjamin) is a Commander who longs for a glamorous, important assignment and ends up collecting trash instead. He is skilled and competent, but extraordinarily unlucky.
- Betty I and Betty II, a.k.a. The Bettys (Cyb Barnstable and Patricia Barnstable) are the navigators and pilots of the ship. They are completely identical, with identical red-hot passions for Quark. One of them is a clone of the other, but each claims the other one is the clone. They have a tendency to speak in perfect unison and have exactly the same thought at exactly the same time. Quark, when describing his crew, explains that he is "extremely fond" of Betty, but he is not sure which one.
- Gene/Jean (Tim Thomerson) is a "transmute", a humanoid being with a complete set of both male and female chromosomes. He/she serves as the ship's engineer. The gender confusion manifests in a split personality—when Gene's macho male side is in control, he is gung-ho, angry and violent with a pathological hatred of the Klingon-like "Gorgons", while the much more mild-mannered Jean personality is stereotypically feminine and demure, pacifistic and a bit of a coward. He/she will frequently switch personalities with no warning, and usually at the worst possible time.
- O.B. Mudd (Douglas V. Fowley) is the research and equipment specialist, an old mad scientist-type who only appears in the pilot episode and is introduced as spending much of his spare time working to perfect Andy (see below).
- Ficus Pandorata (Richard Kelton) is Quark's Spock-like science officer and is a "Vegeton", a member of a race of sentient plant life (Ficus pandorata or pandurata is better known as Ficus lyrata, the fiddle-leaf fig). He is of completely human appearance although he tends to shrivel up when he gets dehydrated. While he is extremely intelligent, observant and always calmly rational, he is incapable of any sort of human emotion, including both fear and tact. He frequently finds the behavior of the rest of the crew difficult to understand, his curiosity leading him to have philosophical debates about the human condition with Quark, usually at the most inopportune moments.
- Andy (Bobby Porter) is a not-at-all-human-looking robot, made from spare parts, with a cowardly and neurotic personality.
- Otto Bob Palindrome (Conrad Janis) is in charge of Perma One, and gives Commander Quark his assignments. He is a stereotypical bureaucrat who gives new definition to the word "petty" — a nightmare tyrant to his underlings and a quivering toady towards his superiors. Palindrome seems to take a special delight in making Quark's life miserable, although deep down he does seem to have a certain well-hidden affection for Adam. His first name, "Otto", is a palindrome, as is his middle name, "Bob."
- Dink is a diminutive and very hairy alien aide to Palindrome who resembles a curly blond version of Cousin Itt. His voice is a xylophone-like electronic warble. He often provides a foil for Palindrome's concerns about his job and about Quark, both of whom he comes to for dating advice. There is another member of his species on Perma 1 called Dook whose masses of long hair resemble brown and red wool.
- The Head (Alan Caillou) is the being to whom Palindrome answers. He is usually seen as a disembodied head with an enormous cranium. He is detached from day-to-day events, has a low tolerance for failure, and a tendency to come up with bizarre tasks for Quark to accomplish — usually at the worst possible time. His trademark sign-off is "The galaxy, ad infinitum!"
- Interface (Misty Rowe) is a four-armed alien woman who functioned as an operator for all interstellar calls. The perfect example of a communications bureaucrat, she is more concerned about correct charges for lasergrams than about saving the Galaxy. Appeared only in the pilot but is mentioned in at least one later episode.
- Ergo is a multi-eyed little blob that was Quark's pet, paralleling Pinback and the Alien from the movie Dark Star. In the pilot, the colorless and translucent Ergo seemed intent on killing Quark, but in the final episode when he appeared again he was much more subdued and pea soup green in color.

== Episodes ==
A United Galaxy Sanitation Patrol cruiser

No.	Title	Directed by	Written by	Original release date
1	"Quark"	Peter H. Hunt	Buck Henry	May 7, 1977
A deep space phenomenon threatens to destroy the galaxy, and Quark's ship is the only one in the area. Palindrome and The Head instruct Quark to go on a suicide mission to save their civilization, but he's so far away they can only contact him by telegram. The two of them argue over telegram costs and spend most of the episode trying to reduce the number of words in the message so as to keep the cost down. Meanwhile Quark and company accidentally save the day anyway. Ficus was not a part of the cast in this episode, and the "science guy" role was held by Dr. O.B. Mudd, a crotchety one-eyed old man played by Douglas Fowley (Mudd lost his eye while working at his science station when he fell asleep while using his microscope). It is mentioned that Mudd and Quark built Andy together. Mudd never appeared or was mentioned again in the series, and no explanation was given for his departure from the show, other than a gag about transferring. The Barnstable twins are credited with the last name "Barnett" in the pilot.
2	"May the Source Be with You"	Hy Averback	Steve Zacharias	February 24, 1978
Perma One is in a state of emergency, as the Gorgons have created the ultimate weapon to defeat the United Galaxy. Palindrome gives Quark the secret weapon, "The Source" (voiced by Hans Conried). Quark must believe completely in the Source in order to defeat the Gorgons. The episode parodies elements from Star Wars and 1930s sci-fi serials Flash Gordon and Buck Rogers. The episode title parodies the phrase "May the Force Be with You" from Star Wars. Henry Silva is menacing and Vader-like as the "High Gorgon". In the Spanish-language version the scene where the Bettys compare Quark to a god was removed so as not to offend Catholic viewers.
3	"The Old and the Beautiful"	Hy Averback	Bruce Kane	March 3, 1978
Expecting his usual garbage hauling assignment, Quark is excited to hear that the Head has authorized an "extended romantic interlude" with Princess Carna of Kamamor (Barbara Rhoades). Troubles ensue when the crew encounter a stray space baggy carrying a virus which ages Quark two years for every hour. Borrows from & parodies elements of the Star Trek: The Original Series episode "The Deadly Years". Kirstie Alley appears in her first, (uncredited) screen role as Princess Carna's second handmaiden.
4	"The Good, the Bad and the Ficus"	Hy Averback	Stuart Gillard	March 10, 1978
While on a routine mission, the ship is accidentally pulled into a black hole, which splits the crew into good and evil counterparts. The exception is Ficus, who remains the same because "there are no good or evil plants, there are just plants", leading both sets of crew members to scream at him in their usual exasperation. After Quark confronts and defeats his evil self on a nearby asteroid, he sends the evil crew back through the black hole. As the evil crew is being sent back we hear the evil Adam Quark say "Keep your deflectors up, do-gooder! You haven't seen the last of this face!" Borrows from and parodies elements of the Star Trek: The Original Series episode "The Enemy Within". The episode title is a play on the film The Good, the Bad and the Ugly.
5	"Goodbye, Polumbus"	Hy Averback	Bruce Kane	March 17, 1978
Quark and his crew are sent on a suicide mission to Polumbus to discover why no one has returned alive. Quark and his crew fall prey to their fantasies as part of a fiendish plot by the dreaded Gorgons to drain the minds of the United Galaxy's most brilliant scientists. Quark encounters a beautiful dream girl, Ficus encounters a teacher, the Bettys encounter dancing clones of Quark, and Gene/Jean encounters his favorite comic book character "Zoltar the Magnificent" (Denny Miller). In order to save his crew, Quark must destroy the obelisk and free the shape-shifting "Clay People" it enslaved. Borrows from and parodies the Star Trek original series episodes "Shore Leave" and "This Side of Paradise". The episode's title is a play on the film Goodbye, Columbus starring Richard Benjamin.
6	"All the Emperor's Quasi-Norms: Part 1"	Bruce Bilson	Jonathan Kaufer	March 24, 1978
While on a routine mission, Quark and his crew are captured by Zorgon the Malevolent (played by Ross Martin), the Most Vicious Gorgon Space Pirate and Half-Brother to the High Gorgon Himself. Zorgon tries to learn from Quark where to find "It"—which represents a problem as Quark has no idea what "It" is. Meanwhile, Zorgon's daughter, Princess Libido (played by Joan Van Ark), has fallen in love with Ficus. Ficus agrees to a meeting with Princess Libido in hopes of letting her down gently because, as he explains to her, "Where I come from, we don't kiss. We pollinate." This line of reasoning fails to dissuade her. The next scene finds both of them lying on the floor on their backs, sticking their arms and legs up in the air, and saying "bee bee bee bee" over and over again, increasing in rapidity and pitch in anticipation of the arrival of the bee. Andy and Gene/Jean escape and disguise themselves as Gorgon scientists and Gene/Jean is asked to give a lecture on "It". The episode cliffhanger has Quark horrified to realize that the location for "It" that he gave as a bluff has turned out to be absolutely correct. This episode (and Part 2) borrows from & parodies Flash Gordon with sendups of Ming the Merciless, his daughter Princess Aura, Prince Barin and Prince Vultan.
7	"All the Emperor's Quasi-Norms: Part 2"	Bruce Bilson	Jonathan Kaufer	March 31, 1978
Ficus sacrifices himself and marries Princess Libido to save the crew. Gene/Jean manages to impress the Gorgon scientists with its lecture, and it and Andy escape. Quark and the Bettys are sent down to the planet to be eaten by a Lizigoth, but are saved by the Baron of The Forest People. With the Baron's help, Quark locates "It", which turns out to be a small stone on a necklace. Subsequent events (a door being opened, a disintegration ray deflecting off the stone) lead Quark to believe he is invincible when in fact "It" is nothing more than a powerless rock. Quark returns to Zorgon's ship, survives a struggle with Zorgon's monster champion, and leaves the planet with his crew after Zorgon accidentally shoots Libido, freeing Ficus from his obligation to her. Unfortunately, when Quark tries to report on what happened, Palindrome has absolutely no interest. His assistant, Dink, however, is fascinated by the story.
8	"Vanessa 38-24-36"	Hy Averback	Robert A. Keats	April 7, 1978
During "Holiday Number 11", an advanced new ship's computer, Vanessa, is installed on Quark's ship for a test flight as an experiment. Vanessa's efficiency in controlling every aspect of the ship is intended to show human crews are obsolete. A seeming attack by a Gorgon ship turns out to be a simulation programmed by Vanessa in an attempt to prove her superiority to Quark. Vanessa begins acting erroneously, and then tries to destroy Quark. Quark and the crew confer in secret to discuss disconnecting Vanessa. Vanessa then incapacitates the crew and takes control of Andy. Quark is able to disable Vanessa and throw her out the garbage hatch. As Quark, Palindrome and the crew celebrate "Number 11", we see Vanessa drifting through space singing "Born Free". Borrows from and parodies the Star Trek: The Original Series episode "The Ultimate Computer" and 2001: A Space Odyssey.

== Reception ==
=== Awards ===
The series won one Emmy Award nomination, for costume designer Grady Hunt's work in the episode "All the Emperor's Quasi-Norms, Part 2".

=== In popular culture ===
In the television series Breaking Bad, the character Gale Boetticher creates a music video of himself singing "Major Tom (Coming Home)" by Peter Schilling with footage of Quark in the background. It originally appeared in short in the episode "Bullet Points," but the full music video was later released online by AMC.

== Home media ==
The complete series was released on DVD on October 14, 2008.
