= Richard Kelton =

American actor (1943–1978)

- Born: Richard Duane Kelton; April 29, 1943; Lincoln, Nebraska, U.S.
- Died: November 27, 1978 (aged 35); Denver, Colorado, U.S.
- Occupation: Actor
- Years active: 1963–1978
- Spouse: Eileen Jacobsen
- Children: 1

Richard Duane Kelton (April 29, 1943 – November 27, 1978) was an American actor.

== Life and career ==
Kelton was born in Lincoln, Nebraska. After briefly attending Northeastern Oklahoma A&M College in 1963, he transferred to the University of Kansas, earning his bachelor's degree in drama 1966, and then his masters' two years later, in 1968. He returned briefly in 1973 to appear in a campus production. He made his way to California where he made his debut playing "Bud" in an episode of Gunsmoke. In 1967, he made his film debut with a small part in the movie In Cold Blood (1967) as Nancy's boyfriend. Soon after arriving in California with his wife in 1970, he got guest-starring roles in The Young Rebels and The Waltons.

Soon afterwards, he made his TV movie debut as Lieutenant Charring in Wild Women (1970). He continued in numerous other guest starring roles and movie roles. He also played the role of Nick in the Broadway revival of Who's Afraid Of Virginia Woolf? in 1976.

After returning to California in 1976, he had a guest-starring role on ABC-TV's Charlie's Angels. He played the role of alien science officer Ficus Pandorata on the short-lived NBC-TV science fiction series Quark (1978). Later that year he was invited back to The University of Kansas to give a short seminar on films.

== Death ==
Kelton died of accidental carbon monoxide asphyxiation due to a faulty heater in his trailer while filming the NBC-TV miniseries Centennial, in which he was to have co-starred. Universal Studios, which produced the TV miniseries, was fined $720 for the failure to provide a proper ventilation system for the trailer to which Kelton had retreated to rehearse his lines.

== Legacy ==
His alma mater, KU, established the Richard Kelton Memorial Fund in December 1978 to aid student actors in their professional acting aspirations. The fund still exists today in the form of the Richard Kelton Memorial Scholarship, that provides scholarships for undergraduate students majoring in theatre with an emphasis in acting.

== Filmography ==
Year	Title	Character	Notes
1967	In Cold Blood	Bobby Rupp	Uncredited, film role
1970	Wild Women	Lt. Charring	TV movie
1970	Heroic Mission	Nancy's Boyfriend	TV series, uncredited role
1970	The Young Rebels	Edward Brockton	TV series
1970-1973	Gunsmoke	Bud / Clayt Colter / Ab Craddock / Rick Wilson	5 episodes
1971	Mission: Impossible	Billy Walsh	in episode "Takeover"
1971	The F.B.I.	Chuck Davis	in episode "The Hitchhiker"
1971	Cade's County	Paul Jeffries	TV series
1972	The Waltons	Anson Collier	in episode "The Foundling"
1972	Hawaii Five-O	Lt. Carter	in episode R & R & R
1972	Room 222	Reverend Mike Holloway	in episode "Where Is It Written?"
1973	Hawkins	Don Morrison	Episode: "Blood Feud"
1974	McQ	Radicial	Film
1974	Harry O	Bill Dempsey	in episode "Guardian at the Gates"
1974	The Lives of Benjamin Franklin		TV mini-series
1974	Kung Fu	Graham	in episode "My Brother, My Executioner""
1974	Nakia	Uncredited role	1 episode
1974	Silence	Al	Film
1974	The Cowboys	Carl Rivers	1 episode
1974	The Streets of San Francisco	Stuttering Kidnapper	in episode "Chapel of the Damned"
1975	Joe Forrester	Uncredited role	1 episode
1975	Medical Story	Uncredited role	in episode "Us Against the World"
1975	Matt Helm	Jed Larson	in episode "Murder on Ice"
1975	The Ultimate Warrior	Cal	Feature film
1975	Barbary Coast	Cad Shugrue	TV series; in episode "The Ballad of Redwing Jail"
1975	Archer	Ernest Richter	1 episode
1976	Logan's Run	Sanctuary Man	Voice, Uncredited
1977	The Feather and Father Gang	Colby	TV series; in episode "The People's Choice"
1977	Charlie's Angels	Hubie	in episode "Pretty Angels All in a Row"
1978	Dallas	Taylor "Guzzler" Bennett	in episode "Fallen Idol"
1978	A Guide for the Married Woman	Everett Hemming-Fantasy Man	TV movie
1978	Go West, Young Girl	Griff	TV movie
1978	Quark	Ficus	7 episodes
1978	The Incredible Hulk	Carl	in episode "The Beast Within"
1978	Police Woman	Ron Chamberlin	in episode "Sixth Sense"
1979	The Rockford Files	Norman Wheeler	in episode "The Deuce"
1979	How the West Was Won	Trey Hollingsworth	ABC-TV Miniseries, in episode "Hillary", (final appearance)
