= Billy Two Hats =

1974 film

- US film poster
- Directed by: Ted Kotcheff
- Written by: Alan Sharp
- Produced by: Norman Jewison; Patrick J. Palmer
- Starring: Gregory Peck; Desi Arnaz, Jr. Jack Warden; David Huddleston
- Cinematography: Brian West
- Edited by: Thom Noble
- Music by: John Scott
- Production company: Algonquin Films
- Distributed by: United Artists
- Release date: March 13, 1974 (Los Angeles)
- Running time: 100 minutes
- Countries: United Kingdom; Israel; United States
- Language: English
- Budget: $1.1 million

Billy Two Hats is a 1974 American Western film directed by Ted Kotcheff. It stars Gregory Peck, Jack Warden, and Desi Arnaz, Jr. Filmed on-location in Israel, Billy Two Hats is from a script by Scottish writer Alan Sharp, the screenwriter of Rob Roy and Ulzana's Raid.

== Plot ==
Following a bank robbery in the American West, the partner of Scottish outlaw Arch Deans is killed and his young Kiowa half-breed friend Billy Two Hats is captured. While Billy is being transported, Deans gets the drop on Sheriff Henry Gifford at a remote trading post, enabling Billy to escape. As they flee, the sheriff's friend, the trading post owner named Copeland, takes down his old, long-range buffalo rifle and fires a shot that kills Deans' horse, the fall breaking Dean's leg. Billy builds a travois on which Deans can ride, dragged behind Billy's horse. Gifford and Copeland set out after the two outlaws. Deans and Billy encounter even more trouble on the trail, four Indians demand whiskey from them, but Billy talks their way out of it.

Billy and Deans encounter Spencer and his wife, Esther, at their remote homestead. Deans persuades Spencer to take him in his wagon to get horses on the condition that Billy stays with Esther to protect her and the homestead from marauding Indians. Billy is also to keep a lookout for the pursuing Gifford. Billy and Esther spend their time together talking and developing romantic feelings for each other. Esther, a young mail-order bride from the East, is unhappy with her older, abusive husband. She falls in love with the young, good-looking Billy. Gifford (Copeland having returned to his store) finds the two in bed together, assumes Billy raped the woman, becomes enraged, and beats him. Esther attempts to explain, but cannot because she stutters uncontrollably when distressed.

Deans and Spencer encounter trouble on the trail, the four Indians who demanded whiskey from Deans and Billy earlier, ambush their wagon in a canyon, killing the horse and besieging them. Spencer is killed. Gifford, Esther, and Billy then set out after Deans. They find Deans near death. With Esther's help, Billy kills Gifford. Deans dies of his wounds. Not believing in burying the dead, Billy places his body in a tree atop a hill, Indian fashion. Esther and he ride off together.

== Cast ==
- Gregory Peck as Arch Deans
- Desi Arnaz, Jr. as Billy Two Hats
- Jack Warden as Marshal Henry Gifford
- David Huddleston as Copeland, Saloon Owner
- Sian Barbara Allen as Esther Spencer
- John Pearce as Spencer
- Dawn Little Sky as Copeland's Squaw
- W. Vincent St. Cyr as Indian Leader
- Henry Medicine Hat as Indian
- Zev Berlinsky as Indian
- Antony Scott as Indian
- Vic Armstrong as Harry Sweets Bradley

== Reception ==
Variety called the film "a fresh, different oater (the first filmed in Israel) that opens with violence and contains some throughout, but never lingers lovingly on mayhem and gore; ergo, it's tame for the Sam Peckinpah bunch, but so well handled in every way, it should have a good future both here and abroad." Gene Siskel of the Chicago Tribune gave the film two stars out of four and wrote, "When the action turns, as inevitably it must, to conversation between Peck and Arnaz, 'Billy Two Hats' becomes vapid. And when young Arnaz strikes up a romance with a rancher's stuttering mail-order bride, the action and dialog become positively embarrassing." Kevin Thomas of the Los Angeles Times wrote, "Writer Alan Sharp's characters are all well-drawn and well-acted, but 'Billy Two Hats's' pacing is too languid and its style too portentous to sustain interest in them." John Raisbeck of The Monthly Film Bulletin wrote, "Like Ulzana's Raid, also written by Alan Sharp, Billy Two Hats is a film of hunters and hunted, centering on the father/son relationship; only here, the traditional roles are reversed, with the grizzled Deans (Gregory Peck wrestling unsuccessfully with a Scottish accent) having to lean on his resourceful young companion. The motif, however, is handled with an obviousness which characterises much of the film."

== See also ==
- List of American films of 1974
