= John Pearce (actor) =

American actor

- Born: John Bonnell Pearce; November 7, 1927; Gainesville, Georgia, U.S.
- Died: April 29, 2000 (aged 72) (throat cancer); West Los Angeles, California, U.S.A.
- Occupations: Actor; Stuntman
- Years active: 1967-1987

John Pearce (November 27, 1927 - April 29, 2000) was an American theater, television and film actor, as well as occasional stuntman.

== Partial filmography ==
- A Covenant with Death (1967) as Minister (uncredited)
- Cool Hand Luke (1967) as John (uncredited)
- The Student Nurses (1970) as Patient
- THX 1138 (1970) as DWY
- Sweet Kill (1972) as Mr. Howard
- The Culpepper Cattle Co. (1972) as Spectator Merlotte
- The Great Northfield Minnesota Raid (1972) as Frank James
- Ulzana's Raid (1972) as Corporal Pinot
- Billy Two Hats (1974) as Spencer
- The Klansman (1974) as Taggart
- The Call of the Wild (1976, TV Movie) as 2nd Man
- September 30, 1955 (1977) as Randy / T.V. Man
- The Stunt Man (1980) as Garage Guard
- Little Treasure (1985) as Joseph
