= Sarah Harris (actress) =

British actress

Sarah Jayne-Harris, originally Sarah Harris, (born 9 March 1983) is a British actress.

In January 2010 she starred in Ryan J-W Smith's award-winning film For Rachel, a tribute to Rachel Corrie. This film was winner of Best Short 8th Cinewest Flex International Film Festival.

She also played the title role in independent short film Ellie Goes to the Movies 2005 which was screened at the 'Dorset Arts Festival' and the 'Tromafling' in Edinburgh.

She recently appeared in Henry McGeogh's film Pub Crawl 2009 with 555 Films and played in David Mamet's Reunion and Dark Pony 2009.

In 2010 she returned to the Sturdy Beggars Theatre to play Miss Julie in Patrick Marber's After Miss Julie.
