= Palace Chase =

The Palace Chase program allows active duty officers and airmen to voluntarily transfer from active duty in the United States Air Force (USAF) to the United States Air Force Reserve (USAFR) or the Air National Guard (ANG).

== Eligibility ==
To be eligible for Palace Chase, enlisted airmen must be at least halfway through their first enlistment. Officers must be two-thirds of the way through all of their remaining Active Duty Service Commitments (ADSC). Additionally, the airmen cannot have applied for and been denied Palace Chase within the previous 120 days.

== Execution ==
The member's remaining ADSC or term of enlistment may be waived, for approved applicants, in exchange for the member's agreement to participate in a Selected Reserve ("Traditional Reserve / Traditional Guard") program in the Air Reserve Component (ARC), the ARC consisting of both the Air Force Reserve and the Air National Guard. Personnel transitioning to an ARC billet also remain eligible for acceptance into the full-time Active Guard and Reserve (AGR) and Air Reserve Technician (ART) programs. The required service time in the Air Force Reserve or Air National Guard for enlisted follows a formula that involves time left on current enlistment and any service commitments. The service time for officers is usually three times the longest remaining length of an ADSC that was waived.

== Conditions ==
Personnel separating from active military service under the Palace Chase program are required to report to the gaining unit and participate satisfactorily in all Reserve/Guard-training activities for the duration of the Palace Chase contract. Failure to fulfill the contract could result in administrative action and recall to active duty in the Regular Air Force.
