= Desi Arnaz Jr. =

American actor and musician (born 1953)

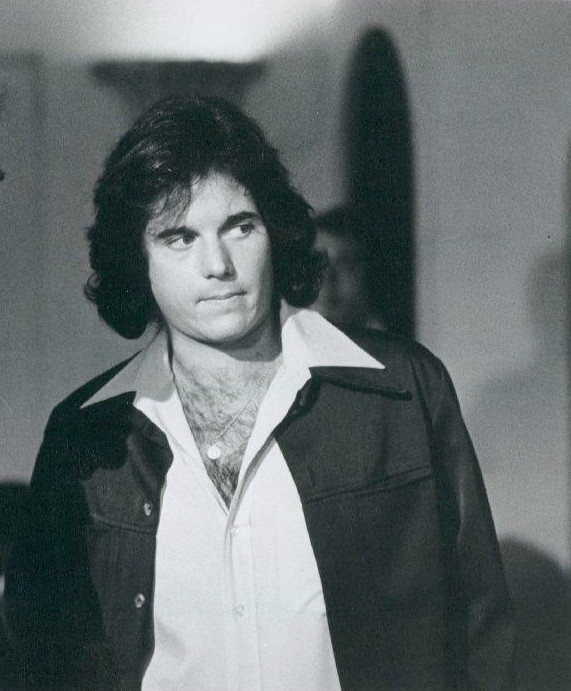
- Arnaz Jr. during filming of The Streets of San Francisco in 1976
- Born: Desiderio Alberto Arnaz IV; January 19, 1953 (age 73); Los Angeles, California, U.S.
- Occupations: Actor; musician
- Years active: 1957–2012, 2021
- Spouses: Linda Purl (m. 1979; div. 1980); Amy Laura Bargiel (m. 1987; died 2015)
- Children: 2
- Parents: Desi Arnaz; Lucille Ball
- Relatives: Lucie Arnaz (sister); Fred Ball (maternal uncle); Desiderio Alberto Arnaz II (paternal grandfather)

Desiderio Alberto Arnaz IV (born January 19, 1953), better known as Desi Arnaz Jr., is an American retired actor and musician. He is the son of Lucille Ball and Desi Arnaz.

== Early life ==
Arnaz was born on January 19, 1953, at Cedars of Lebanon Hospital in Hollywood, Los Angeles. His older sister is actress Lucie Arnaz, who was born in 1951.

His birth was one of the most publicized in television history. His parents were the stars of the television sitcom I Love Lucy, and Ball's pregnancy was part of the story line, which was considered daring in 1952. The same day Ball gave birth to Desi Jr., the fictional Lucy Ricardo gave birth to "Little Ricky". As a testament to how interested the American public was in Lucy's TV baby, Arnaz appeared on the cover of the first issue of TV Guide with the headline "Lucy's $50,000,000 baby", ($610,000,000 in 2025 dollars) because revenue from advertising tie-ins was expected to top that amount. Actor Richard Keith (a.k.a. Keith Thibodeaux) later portrayed "Little Ricky" in the TV series; Keith spent much time with Lucie and Desi Jr. in childhood and became close friends with the family, teaching Desi Jr. how to play drums.

Arnaz attended University High School in West Los Angeles.

== Career ==
At age 12, Arnaz was a drummer with Dino, Desi & Billy. The others were Dean Paul Martin (son of Dean Martin) and Billy Hinsche. The band scored two hit singles with "I'm a Fool" and "Not the Lovin' Kind" in 1965. Following Martin's death in 1987 and Hinsche's death in 2021, Arnaz is the sole surviving member of the trio.

=== Acting ===
From 1968 to 1974, Desi Arnaz and his sister Lucie co-starred opposite their mother in Here's Lucy as her children, Kim and Craig Carter. In 1968, he had a guest-starring role as Jerry and Suzie's drum-playing friend Tommy in the episode, "The Hombre Who Came to Dinner: Part 2", from the show The Mothers-in-Law, executive-produced and directed by his father. In 1970, he appeared on The Brady Bunch episode "The Possible Dream". He starred in the tearjerker movie Red Sky at Morning in 1971 with Richard Thomas, Richard Crenna and Claire Bloom. His best chance at enduring Hollywood fame came in 1973, when he played the title role in the film Marco, a musical about the life of adventurer Marco Polo. However, like most Hollywood musicals of that period, it failed to register at the box office.

In 1974, Arnaz played the title role in the Western movie Billy Two Hats with Gregory Peck. In 1976, he appeared on two episodes of the television series, The Streets of San Francisco. Arnaz also appeared in a 1976 episode of Saturday Night Live (SNL) hosted by both Desi Arnaz and Desi Arnaz Jr.. The younger Arnaz played Ricky Ricardo while Gilda Radner played Lucy in spoofs of supposed ill-fated pilots for I Love Lucy.

In 1977, he was the lead in the film Joyride opposite fellow children of famous actors Melanie Griffith, Robert Carradine, and Anne Lockhart.

Arnaz's acting extended into the late 1980s with various appearances on television, and a leading role in the short-lived TV series Automan, which ran from 1983 to 1984 in only 12 episodes.

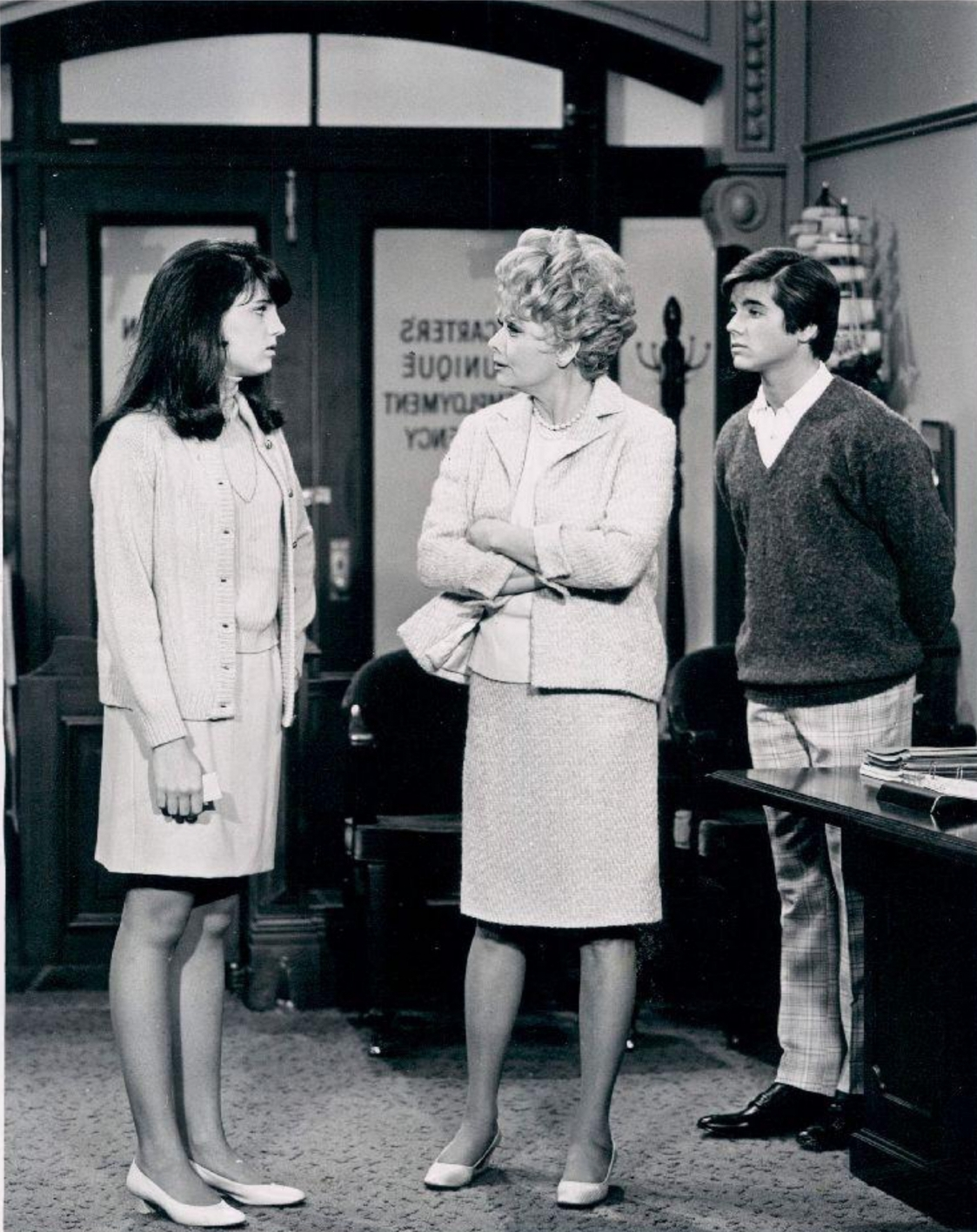
Arnaz; his mother, Lucille Ball; and his sister, Lucie, in Here's Lucy, 1968.

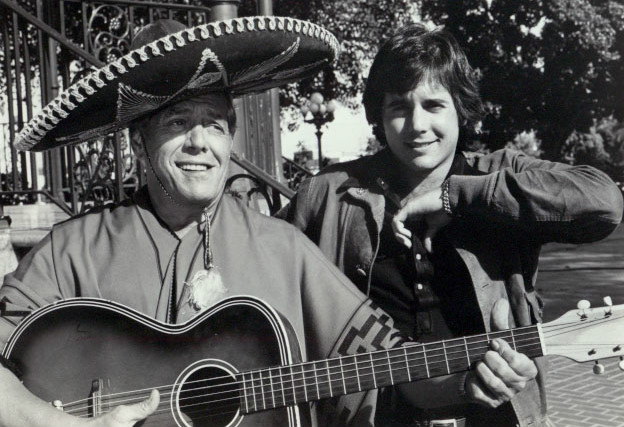
Desi Arnaz and Arnaz on the television special California, My Way, 1974.

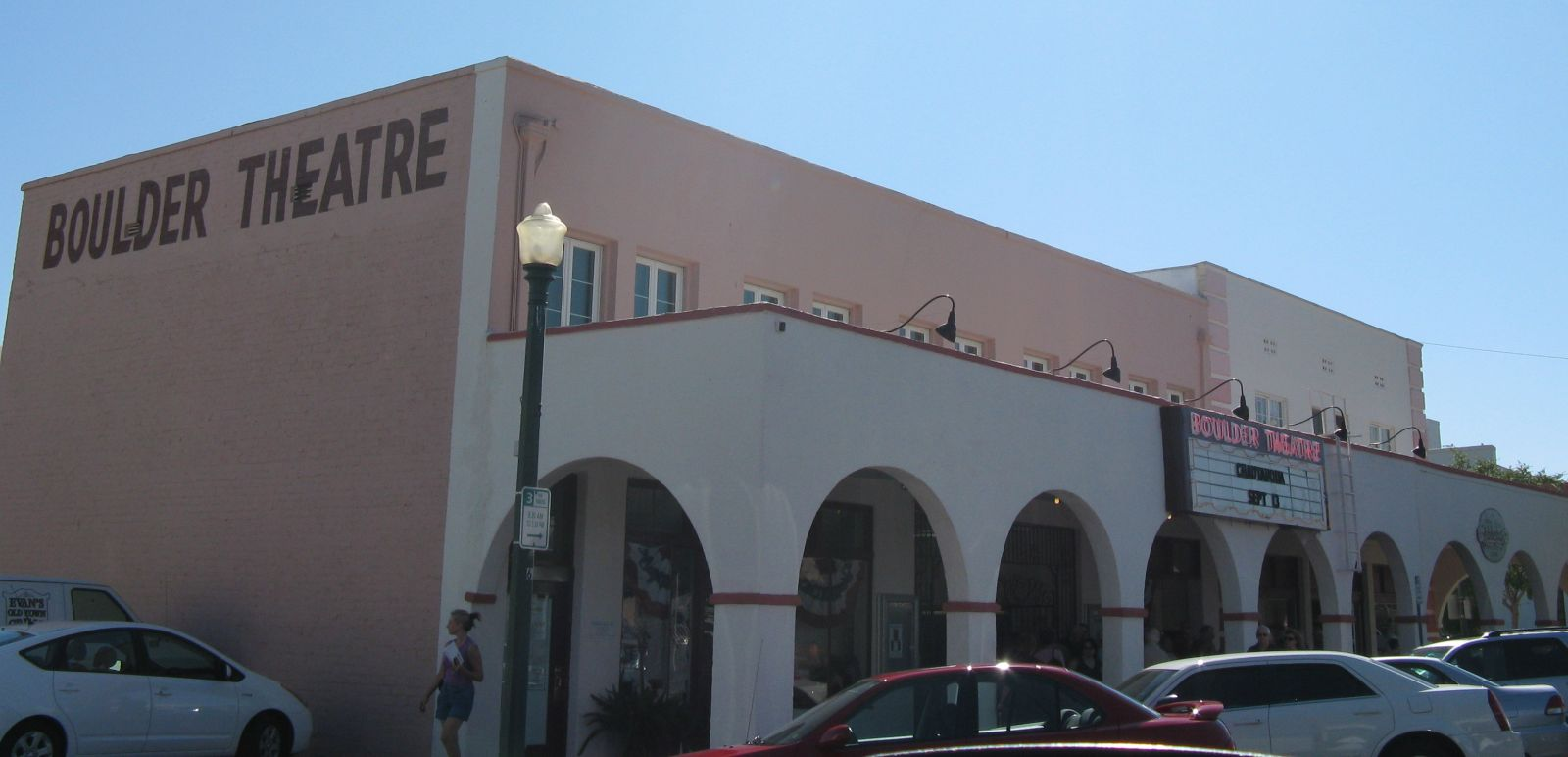
Boulder Theatre

In 1992, he played his father in the movie The Mambo Kings, based on a Pulitzer Prize-winning novel that he felt treated his father with respect. The film includes a scene in which Desi Jr., playing his father's character Ricky Ricardo, acts opposite his mother as Lucy Ricardo with film from the TV series intercut with the cast.

=== Later career ===
From 1998 to 2010, he was touring with a new configuration of Dino, Desi & Billy called Ricci, Desi & Billy, featuring Arnaz reunited with Billy Hinsche, and joined by Ricci Martin (youngest son of Dean Martin). The group performed original material as well as the songs the original band performed.

From about 2002 to 2007, he was vice-president of the board of Directors of the Lucille Ball–Desi Arnaz Center in Jamestown, New York. He resigned over a dispute with the executive director over the center.

In 2007, Arnaz appeared at the 5th Annual TV Land Awards with his sister Lucie to accept the Legacy of Laughter award posthumously given to their mother.

Arnaz has also headlined Babalu: A Celebration of the Music of Desi Arnaz and his Orchestra with Lucie Arnaz, Raul Esparza, and Valarie Pettiford.

On October 15, 2011, Arnaz performed in Babalu at the Coolidge Auditorium of the Library of Congress. The performance was in conjunction with the Library's Lucille Ball and Desi Arnaz Collection. In 2021, Arnaz and his sister Lucie served as executive producers for the film, Being the Ricardos.

== Personal life ==
Arnaz has a daughter, Julia Arnaz, from a relationship with model Susan Callahan-Howe in 1968 when they were both 15 years old; Julia's relationship to Desi Jr. was proven by a paternity test in 1991.

Arnaz dated actress Patty Duke when he was 17 and she was 23. He accompanied Duke to the 1970 Emmy Awards ceremony where she won the Emmy for Outstanding Single Performance. His mother did not approve of the relationship as it became tabloid news and Duke became pregnant. After they broke up, writer and music producer Michael Tell offered to marry Duke as a way out of the scandal. Their marriage lasted 13 days, and Duke later told her son, Sean Astin, that Arnaz was his biological father. Arnaz and Astin developed a close relationship, although genetic tests later revealed that Tell was his biological father. Astin responded to press inquires, "I can call any of them on the phone any time I want to ... John, Desi, Mike, or Papa Mike ... my four dads." (Sean Astin's stepfather was Michael Pearce, Patty Duke's husband after John Astin.)

Arnaz was subsequently involved with entertainer Liza Minnelli, another relationship of which his mother disapproved; Ball thought that the singer-actress was too old for her son and, because of Minnelli's perceived reckless lifestyle, not a good influence upon him. In May 1972, Arnaz announced his engagement to Minnelli. He accompanied her to the Academy Awards ceremony in March 1973 when she won the Academy Award for Best Actress. While in London, Minnelli ended their engagement, to be with comedian Peter Sellers in May 1973.

Arnaz married actress Linda Purl in 1979. On January 3, 1980, Purl filed for divorce, which was finalized later that year. On October 8, 1987, Arnaz married Amy Laura Bargiel. The couple lived in Boulder City, Nevada, with their daughter, Haley. In 1997, Arnaz purchased the Boulder Theatre in town and restored it, when it had been on the brink of ruin. After its conversion to a theatre, the cinema became the home of the Boulder City Ballet Company.

Desi's wife, Amy, died of cancer in 2015, at age 63. Both Desi and Amy were followers of Vernon Howard and attended meetings of Howard's New Life Foundation in Boulder City. They also followed and have supported the spiritual writer Guy Finley (also one of Vernon Howard's students) and his Life of Learning Center for Spiritual Discovery.

Arnaz's granddaughter, Desiree S. Anzalone (daughter of Julia), a photographer, died from breast cancer on September 27, 2020, at age 31, six years after it was first diagnosed. Arnaz is still a resident of Boulder City, Nevada.

== Filmography ==
- 1957: I Love Lucy – Spectator at Unveiling (1 episode, 1957)
- 1962: The Lucy Show – Spectator (5 episodes, 1962–1965)
- 1968: Here's Lucy – Craig Carter (1968–1972)
- 1968: The Mothers-in-Law – Tommy (2 episodes, 1968)
- 1970: The Brady Bunch (as himself) ("The Possible Dream" episode)
- 1971: Love, American Style – Alan (segment "Love and the Motel Mixup") (1 episode, 1971)
- 1971: The Mod Squad – Victor Emory (1 episode, 1971)
- 1971: Mr. and Mrs. Bo Jo Jones (Made for TV movie) – Bo Jo Jones
- 1971: Night Gallery – Doran (1 episode, 1971)
- 1971: Red Sky at Morning – William 'Steenie' Stenopolous
- 1973: Marco – Marco Polo
- 1973: She Lives! (TV) – Andy Reed
- 1973: Voyage of the Yes (TV) – Cal Markwell
- 1974: Billy Two Hats – Billy Two Hats
- 1975: Medical Story – Jerry Mitchell (1 episode, 1975)
- 1975: Medical Center (1 episode, 1975)
- 1976: Saturday Night Live (February 21, as musical guest)
- 1976: The Streets of San Francisco – B. J. Palmer (1 episode, 1976)
- 1976: Police Story – Jay Vernon (2 episodes, 1976)
- 1976: Having Babies (TV) – Frank Gorman
- 1977: Black Market Baby (TV) – Steve Aletti
- 1977: Joyride – Scott
- 1977: Flight to Holocaust (TV) – Rick Bender
- 1978: How to Pick Up Girls! (TV) – Robby Harrington
- 1978: Fantasy Island – Barney Hunter (1 episode, 1978)
- 1978: A Wedding – Dino Sloan Corelli
- 1978: The Courage and the Passion (TV) – Sgt. Tom Wade
- 1978: To Kill a Cop (TV) – Martin Delahanty
- 1978: The Love Boat – Steve Hollis (2 episodes, 1978)
- 1979: Crisis in Mid-Air (TV) – Tim Donovan
- 1980: The Great American Traffic Jam (TV) – Robbie Reinhardt
- 1981: Advice to the Lovelorn (TV) – Steve Vernon
- 1982: Fake-Out – Detective Clint Morgan
- 1983: Automan – Walter Nebicher (13 episodes, 1983–1984)
- 1983: The Night the Bridge Fell Down (TV) – Johnny Pyle
- 1983: House of the Long Shadows – Kenneth Magee
- 1987: Paul Reiser Out on a Whim (TV)
- 1987: Matlock – Michael Porter (1 episode, 1987)
- 1992: The Mambo Kings – Desi Arnaz Sr.
