= Wild Women (1970 film) =

- Genre: Western
- Based on: Vincent Fotre
- Teleplay by: Lou Morheim; Richard Carr
- Directed by: Don Taylor
- Starring: Hugh O'Brian; Anne Francis; Marilyn Maxwell
- Music by: Fred Steiner
- Country of origin: United States
- Original language: English

Production
- Producer: Aaron Spelling
- Cinematography: Fleet Southscott
- Editor: Aaron Stell
- Running time: 74 minutes
- Production company: Aaron Spelling Productions

Original release
- Network: ABC
- Release: October 20, 1970

Wild Women is a 1970 American made-for-television Western film directed by Don Taylor and starring Hugh O'Brian, Anne Francis and Marilyn Maxwell. The film was originally a television pilot that appeared on the ABC Movie of the Week.

The movie premiered on October 20, 1970. When it was rerun during the summer 1971 rerun season, it was the most-viewed primetime broadcast for the week, with a 26.3 rating.

The Los Angeles Times called it "diverting entertainment".

== Plot ==
A band of boisterous paroled female prisoners accompany U.S. Army engineers on an undercover map-making assignment into or near Mexican territory. The assignment also includes the smuggling of weapons into Texas. Their cover story is that the group consists of settlers; each of the women is paired with one of the engineers to appear to be his wife.

== Cast ==
- Hugh O'Brian as Killian
- Anne Francis as Jean Marshek
- Marilyn Maxwell as Maude Webber
- Marie Windsor as Lottie Clampett
- Sherry Jackson as Nancy Belacourt
- Robert F. Simon as Col. Donahue
- Richard Kelton as Cpt. Charring
- Cynthia Hull as Mit-O-Ne
- Pepe Callahan as Lt. Santos, the Mexican
- Ed Call as Sgt. Frame
- John A. Neris as Sgt. Flmer Cass (as John Neris)
- Troy Melton as Cpl. Isham
- Joseph Kaufmann as Pvt. Bishop
- Chuck Hicks as Cpl. Hearn
- Jim Boles as Warden
- Michael Keep as Cadete, the Mescalero
