= Hawaii Five-O (1968 TV series) season 6 =

Hawaii Five-O
- Season 6
- DVD cover
- No. of episodes: 24

Release
- Original network: CBS
- Original release: September 11, 1973 – February 26, 1974

Season chronology
- ← Previous; Season 5 Next → Season 7

The sixth season of Hawaii Five-O premiered on September 11, 1973, and ended February 26, 1974. 24 episodes aired during this season. The Region 1 DVD was released on April 21, 2009.

Creator and executive producer Leonard Freeman died during this season.

== Episodes ==
| No. overall | No. in season | Title | Directed by | Written by | Original release date | Prod. code |
|---|---|---|---|---|---|---|
| 122 | 1 | "Hookman" | Allen Reisner | Glen Olson and Rod Baker | September 11, 1973 | 1310-1729-0457 |
A double amputee (Jay J. Armes) sets out to avenge the loss of his hands by killing every law enforcement officer who contributed to his maiming, including Steve McGarrett. NOTE: Morton Stevens won an Emmy for his score to this episode (in fact, all the nominees in this category at that year's Emmys were from Hawaii Five-O!). On this and all subsequent episodes, Jack Lord receives a "Starring" credit on the end titles as well as in the opening. The episode was remade in 2013 in the series reboot with the same episode title (Season 3, Episode 15).
| 123 | 2 | "Draw Me a Killer" | Charles S. Dubin | Walter Black | September 18, 1973 | 1310-1729-0453 |
McGarrett attempts to solve the riddle of a series of four apparently motiveless slayings that occur at six-week intervals, and his investigations lead him to the comic strip section of a daily newspaper. Can McGarret stop the psychotic killer before Danny Williams becomes victim number 5? Elliott Street guest stars.
| 124 | 3 | "Charter for Death" | Michael O'Herilhy | Carey Wilber and Sheldon Wile | September 25, 1973 | 1310-1729-0459 |
A gangster, his daughter and son-in-law arrive in Hawaii carrying the plague, causing the Governor to seal off the island in an effort to prevent an outbreak of the disease. Nehemiah Persoff, Nephi Hannemann and Bert Convy guest star.
| 125 | 4 | "One Big Happy Family" | Alf Kjellin | Alvin Sapinsley | October 2, 1973 | 1310-1729-0458 |
A family of serial killers, having left a trail of death on the mainland, start a new wave of terror when they reach Hawaii. Slim Pickens, Bo Hopkins and Barbara Baxley guest star.
| 126 | 5 | "The Sunday Torch" | Michael O'Herilhy | Jerome Coopersmith | October 9, 1973 | 1310-1729-0454 |
A young man who fits the classic profile of a pyromaniac/killer is carefully set up in what appears to be a foolproof frame. Michael Anderson Jr., Lippy Espinda and Kwan Hi Lim guest star.
| 127 | 6 | "Murder is a Taxing Affair" | Michael O'Herilhy | S : Tony Palmerio; S/T : Jerome Coopersmith | October 16, 1973 | 1310-1729-0452 |
A corrupt federal tax agent, pursuing a criminal under indictment for tax evasion, kills the fugitive for $600,000 in hot money, then loses it. Jack Dodson, Sally Kirkland and Don Porter guest star.
| 128 | 7 | "Tricks are Not Treats" | Corey Allen | Bill Stratton | October 23, 1973 | 1310-1729-0455 |
The assassination of one of Honolulu's most active pimps threatens an all-out war between two competing vice empires. Ron Glass, Pat Morita and Gregory Sierra guest star.
| 129 | 8 | "Why Wait Till Uncle Kevin Dies?" | Michael O'Herilhy | Jerome Coopersmith | October 30, 1973 | 1310-1729-0456 |
McGarrett investigates a string of five murders of wealthy men and enlists the aid of an undercover agent from the mainland to reveal a pay-before-death inheritance scheme. Murray Matheson and Lawrence Pressman guest star.
| 130 | 9 | "Flash of Color, Flash of Death" | Alf Kjellin | S : Michael Adams; S/T : Norman Lessing | November 6, 1973 | 1310-1729-0463 |
An opal smuggler (Don Knight) is set up by a glamorous woman who clears the way for her accomplices to enter a Honolulu jewelry store and rob him and the jeweler of a fortune in illegal opals.
| 131 | 10 | "A Bullet for El Diablo" | Allen Reisner | Tim Maschler | November 13, 1973 | 1310-1729-0465 |
A brutal dictator is murdered by Rita Salazar (Edith Diaz), half-sister of his kidnapped daughter, Maria Ramos (also Edith Diaz). Charles S. Dubin (who directed Allen Reisner in "Anybody Can Build a Bomb", see below) has a small role as a building manager.
| 132 | 11 | "The Finishing Touch" | Charles S. Dubin | Walter Black | November 20, 1973 | 1310-1729-0464 |
McGarrett becomes suspicious of a documents expert he enlists to help investigate a destructive ring of forgeries of government securities. George Voskovec guest stars.
| 133 | 12 | "Anybody Can Build a Bomb" | Charles S. Dubin | William Bast | November 27, 1973 | 1310-1729-0468 |
A nuclear physicist becomes involved in an extortion scheme to blow up a portion of Honolulu with an atomic bomb. Lew Ayres guest stars (he appeared in the pilot playing the Governor). Allen Reisner (who directed Charles S. Dubin in "A Bullet for El Diablo", see above) has a role as Hermes I.
| 134 | 13 | "Try to Die on Time" | Charles S. Dubin | S : Jacqueline Lynch; S/T : E. Arthur Kean | December 4, 1973 | 1310-1729-0451 |
Five-O must unravel a complicated web of relationships surrounding a macabre $240,000 lottery based on the projected hour of a gambler's death. Jack Carter guest stars.
| 135 | 14 | "The $100,000 Nickel" | Allen Reisner | Dick Nelson | December 11, 1973 | 1310-1729-0462 |
A murderous criminal (Victor Buono) hires a coin swap bunko artist (Eugene Troobnick) to steal a very rare 1913 Liberty Head nickel valued at $100,000 (equal to $725,262 today in inflation, but actually sold for $3,737,500 in 2010), which his panicked accomplice later drops into a vending machine. NOTE: Bruce Broughton received an Emmy nomination for his score.
| 136 | 15 | "The Flip Side is Death" | Paul Stanley | Glen Olson and Rod Baker | December 18, 1973 | 1310-1729-0467 |
Bank robbers fake a military emergency to cover up their crime, sending Five-O to the windward side of Oahu to investigate. Peter Haskell and Don Stroud guest star.
| 137 | 16 | "The Banzai Pipeline" | Richard Benedict | Bill Stratton | January 1, 1974 | 1310-1729-0470 |
The Banzai Pipeline surfing beach is the setting for a murder. Perry King, Nicholas Hammond and Jack Hogan guest star.
| 138 | 17 | "One Born Every Minute" | Charles S. Dubin | Alvin Sapinsley | January 8, 1974 | 1310-1729-0469 |
McGarrett tries to nail a sophisticated con game targeting wealthy male tourists. Ed Flanders, Michael Strong and Tommy Fujiwara guest star.
| 139 | 18 | "Secret Witness" | Michael O'Herilhy | S : Sam Roeca; S/T : Ken Pettus | January 15, 1974 | 1310-1729-0472 |
A professional killer pursues an eyewitness (Mark Jenkins), using the man's dropped library card as his clue. Cindy Williams and Myrtle K. Hilo guest stars.
| 140 | 19 | "Death with Father" | Jack Lord | Anthony Lawrence | January 22, 1974 | 1310-1729-0461 |
A retired narcotics agent's (Andrew Duggan) son (Peter Strauss) is suspected of manufacturing heroin. This was the first episode to be directed by Jack Lord.
| 141 | 20 | "Murder with a Golden Touch" | Michael O'Herilhy | S : Robert Schlitt; S/T : Jerome Coopersmith | January 29, 1974 | 1310-1729-0471 |
A search for sunken treasure leads into the Pacific off Oahu involving two conmen and three murders. James J Sloyan, John Orchard, John Fujioka, Haunani Minn and Peter Donat guest star.
| 142 | 21 | "Nightmare in Blue" | Michael O'Herilhy | Mel Goldberg | February 5, 1974 | 1310-1729-0474 |
An investigation of five rape-murders points to the police. The episode is notable for one of the earliest expositions of rape victim blaming on American television. This episode was broadcast two weeks before the groundbreaking and much-better-known TV movie A Case of Rape about rape victim blaming. John Beck, Katherine Justice and Alan Fudge guest star. NOTE: Don B. Ray received an Emmy nomination for his score.
| 143 | 22 | "Mother's Deadly Helper" | Douglas Green | Walter Black | February 12, 1974 | 1310-1729-0473 |
An extremist (Anthony Zerbe) embarks on a deadly crusade against what he sees as law enforcement leniency. Casey Kasem and Frank Cady guest star.
| 144 | 23 | "Killer at Sea" | Douglas Green | S : Douglas Green; S/T : Jerome Coopersmith | February 19, 1974 | 1310-1729-0475 |
A debt ridden comedian (John Byner) complicates McGarrett's investigation aboard a cruise ship of a bank robbery and a Congressman's murder. Keene Curtis and William Devane guest star.
| 145 | 24 | "30,000 Rooms and I Have the Key" | Charles S. Dubin | E. Arthur Kean | February 26, 1974 | 1310-1729-0466 |
A wealthy stylish jewel thief and master of disguise who steals for the thrill of stealing (David Wayne) evades McGarrett and then sends the Five-O chief an invitation to his next performance. This episode is similar in tone to the episodes "Over Fifty? Steal" and "Odd Man In". At the end, McGarrett remarks, "...You sent the invitation, but forgot about the address".
