= Hawaii Five-O (1968 TV series) season 8 =

Hawaii Five-O
- Season 8
- No. of episodes: 23

Release
- Original network: CBS
- Original release: September 12, 1975 – March 4, 1976

Season chronology
- ← Previous; Season 7 Next → Season 9

This is a list of episodes from the eighth season of Hawaii Five-O.

== Broadcast history ==
The season originally aired Fridays at 9:00-10:00 pm (EST) from September 12 to November 28, 1975 and Thursdays at 9:00-10:00 pm (EST) from December 4, 1975 to March 4, 1976.

== DVD release ==
The season was released on DVD by Paramount Home Video.

== Episodes ==
No. overall	No. in season	Title	Directed by	Written by	Original release date	Prod. code
170	1	"Murder: Eyes Only"	Michael O'Herlihy	T : Jerome Coopersmith; S/T : Orville H. Hampton	September 12, 1975	1310-1729-0558
171	2	"Murder: Eyes Only"	Michael O'Herlihy	T : Jerome Coopersmith; S/T : Orville H. Hampton	September 12, 1975	1310-1729-0558
The letter-bomb murder of a Navy intelligence officer interrupts McGarrett's annual naval reserve duty and involves him in another Wo Fat (Khigh Dhiegh) plot. Harry Guardino, David Birney, Lloyd Bochner and Donna Mills guest stars. NOTE: Shown in syndication in two parts.
172	3	"McGarrett is Missing"	Bruce Bilson	Jerome Coopersmith	September 19, 1975	1310-1729-0552
Escaped convict Charlie Bombay (Charles Cioffi) holds a wounded McGarrett hostage after their plane goes down in a severe storm. NOTE: Bombay was played by Albert Paulsen in Season 2 ("Just Lucky, I Guess") with his first name spelled "Charley" in the credits.
173	4	"Termination with Extreme Prejudice"	Michael O'Herlihy	Norman Lessing	September 26, 1975	1310-1729-0554
McGarrett searches for a missing English nobleman (Murray Matheson) suspected of passing secrets to enemy agents. Juliet Mills and Dan O'Herlihy (brother Michael O'Herlihy directed the episode) guest star. Kwan Hi Lim as Yuan Kee.
174	5	"Target? The Lady"	Charles S. Dubin	Tim Maschler	October 3, 1975	1310-1729-0560
A murder sends Five-O in pursuit of a Las Vegas courier (Susan Dey). Andrew Prine and Marc Singer guest star.
175	6	"Death's Name is SAM"	Michael O'Herlihy	Jerome Coopersmith	October 10, 1975	1310-1729-0551
Five-O investigates a radical terrorist group smuggling a surface-to-air missile piecemeal. George Takei, John Colicos and Constance Towers guest stars.
176	7	"The Case Against McGarrett"	Charles S. Dubin	Alvin Sapinsley	October 17, 1975	1310-1729-0556
McGarrett allows rebelling convicts, led by his old enemy Honoré Vashon (Harold Gould), to try him for murder in exchange for hostages. NOTE: This episode is the sequel to the three-part "V for Vashon" episode from Season 5.
177	8	"The Defector"	Jerry Jameson	Stephen Kandel	October 24, 1975	1310-1729-0566
A scientist (Pat Hingle) demands immunity for a defecting Asian physicist (Soon-Teck Oh).
178	9	"Sing a Song of Suspense"	Bruce Bilson	Bill Stratton	October 31, 1975	1310-1729-0553
McGarrett protects a singer (Lois Nettleton) who was a witness to a mob hit.
179	10	"Retire in Sunny Hawaii...Forever"	Bruce Bilson	Jerome Coopersmith	November 7, 1975	1310-1729-0555
The murder of the airplane seatmate of Danny's aunt (Helen Hayes, James MacArthur's real-life mother, who received an Emmy nomination for Outstanding Lead Actress in a Single Performance for this episode - the show's final Emmy nomination) is linked to abandoned bank accounts. Charles Durning also guest stars.
180	11	"How to Steal a Submarine"	Michael O'Herlihy	Walter Black	November 14, 1975	1310-1729-0564
A high-school vice principal (Jack Cassidy) uses a submarine to recover smuggled narcotics.
181	12	"The Waterfront Steal"	Allen Reisner	Albert Aley	November 21, 1975	1310-1729-0557
A warehouse burglary investigation turns up unusual loot...and an interwoven connection between the young burglar, his girlfriend/accomplice, and her businessman father. Simon Oakland, Kathleen Beller and Richard Hatch guest star.
182	13	"Honor is an Unmarked Grave"	Jack Lord	Bud Freeman	November 28, 1975	1310-1729-0562
An investigative reporter unearths a seven-year-old murder case. Eileen Heckart guest stars.
183	14	"A Touch of Guilt"	Joe Manduke	Anne Collins	December 4, 1975	1310-1729-0570
The investigation of a stabbed college football star points to a gang-rape cover-up and a U.S. Senator's son. Like Season Six's "Nightmare in Blue", this episode is notable for being one of television's earlier expositions of rape victim blaming. Adam Arkin and Richard Masur guest star.
184	15	"Wooden Model of a Rat"	Phillip Leacock	Alvin Sapinsley	December 11, 1975	1310-1729-0567
McGarrett's probe of Asian art smuggling grinds to a halt when he is charged with possession of one of the items. Edward Asner and John Fujioka guest stars. NOTE: Asner would reprise the character 37 years later on Hawaii Five-0 episode "Kalele" (Season 2, Episode 19)
185	16	"Deadly Persuasion"	Allen Reisner	Tim Maschler	December 18, 1975	1310-1729-0572
A mentally unstable young man steals a deadly nerve gas to be used during the visit of a foreign head of state.
186	17	"Legacy of Terror"	Bruce Bilson	Larry Forrester	January 1, 1976	1310-1729-0565
An aged Japanese importer, an ex-spy who may have known the location of a fortune in gold, is slain. Don Porter, Lew Ayres and Mako guest stars.
187	18	"Loose Ends Get Hit"	Charles S. Dubin	Jerome Coopersmith	January 8, 1976	1310-1729-0568
The airtight murder case against a racketeer crumbles when McGarrett learns a witness duped him. Henry Darrow guest stars. NOTE: Introduction of Amanda McBroom as HPD officer Sandi Welles.
188	19	"Anatomy of a Bribe"	Joeseph Manduke	Jerome Coopersmith	January 15, 1976	1310-1729-0575
Five-O investigates the arson of a new building. Allan Arbus and Robert Hogan guest stars.
189	20	"Turkey Shoot at Makapuu"	Ernest Pintoff	Bill Stratton	January 29, 1976	1310-1729-0574
A murder victim's roommate (Lee Purcell) puts herself in danger to help catch the killer. NOTE: This is the final onscreen appearance of Peggy Ryan in the role of McGarrett's secretary, Jenny Sherman.
190	21	"A Killer Grows Wings"	Philip Leacock	Orville H. Hampton	February 5, 1976	1310-1729-0561
Five-O goes after those out to destroy a sugar plantation owner's crop with a special moth larvae. Richard Kiley and Paul Shenar guest stars.
191	22	"The Capsule Kidnapping"	Bernard McEveety	Jack Epps Jr. & Anderson G. House	February 12, 1976	1310-1729-0571
Terrorists lock an industrialist's son in an underwater capsule with a limited air supply and the U.S. Coast Guard is enlisted to help in the search. Bruce Boxleitner, Liam Sullivan and Peter Boyd guest star.
192	23	"Love Thy Neighbor, Take His Wife"	Charles S. Dubin	James Henderson	February 26, 1976	1310-1729-0563
Five-O investigates the kidnapping of the wife of a wealthy land developer. David Huddleston guest stars.
193	24	"A Sentence to Steal"	David Friedkin	Glen Olson & Rod Baker	March 4, 1976	1310-1729-0569
The theft of gold leads Five-O to a half-way house for juvenile offenders. Barbara Baxley, Tommy Sands and Rudy Ramos guest stars.
