= Frank Kane =

Frank Kane may refer to:

- Frank Kane (author) (1912–1968), American detective fiction writer
- Frank Kane (baseball) (1895–1962), American MLB baseball player
- Francis Kane (ice hockey) (1923–2016), Canadian NHL, hockey player
- Frank E. Kane (born 1932), Canadian politician in the Legislative Assembly of New Brunswick

== See also ==
- Frank Caine (1881–1930), Australian rules footballer
