= Hawaii Five-O (1968 TV series) season 7 =

Hawaii Five-O
- Season 7
- No. of episodes: 24

Release
- Original network: CBS
- Original release: September 10, 1974 – March 25, 1975

Season chronology
- ← Previous; Season 6 Next → Season 8

This is a list of episodes from the seventh season of Hawaii Five-O. During this season, the characters Ben Kokua (played by Al Harrington) and Frank Kamana (not part of main cast and played by Doug Mossman) alternately appear as a member of the Five-O squad. This is the first season following the death of the creator and executive producer Leonard Freeman.

== Broadcast history ==
The season originally aired Tuesdays at 9:00-10:00 pm (EST).

== DVD release ==
The season was released on DVD by Paramount Home Video.

== Episodes ==
No. overall	No. in season	Title	Directed by	Written by	Original release date	Prod. code
146	1	"The Young Assassins"	Bruce Bilson	Bill Stratton	September 10, 1974	1310-1729-0507
A band of young radicals is killing ordinary people at random. Five-O consults an academic who is knowledgeable about such groups. The group then kidnaps Dan Williams and the academic, threatening to kill both men. Larry Wilcox and Scott Marlowe guest star.
147	2	"A Hawaiian Nightmare"	Charles S. Dubin	S : Tom Philbin; S/T : William Bast	September 17, 1974	1310-1729-0501
An extortionist threatens to cause a volcanic eruption and destroy the city of Hilo. James Olson and Sheree North guest star.
148	3	"I'll Kill 'Em Again"	Charles S. Dubin	Tim Maschler	September 24, 1974	1310-1729-0503
A egocentric psychopath re-enacts murders featured in an article recounting the team's past crime-solving efforts. Danny Goldman and Ivor Francis guest star.
149	4	"Steal Now--Pay Later"	John Peyser	Jerome Coopersmith	October 1, 1974	1310-1720-0510
While Hawaii Five O investigates the murders of both an undercover federal officer and a HPD Detective killed during two hijacking operations, Mcgarrett matches wits with a fence who sells stolen goods to legitimate industries solely by telephone. Ray Danton, Jacques Aubuchon and Casey Kasem guest star.
150	5	"Bomb, Bomb, Who's Got the Bomb?"	Allen Reisner	Martin Roth	October 8, 1974	1310-1729-0505
A senator (William Windom) is being targeted by a psychotic bomber.
151	6	"Right Grave, Wrong Body"	Paul Stanley	Glen Olson & Rod Baker	October 15, 1974	1310-1729-0504
A bank robber uses a policeman's gun to commit robberies.
152	7	"We Hang Our Own"	Douglas Green	Walter Black	October 22, 1974	1310-1729-0502
A cattle baron (Leslie Nielsen) seeks revenge when one son (Perry King) says another was killed. Bruce Boxleitner also guest stars.
153	8	"The Two-Faced Corpse"	Douglas Green	Bud Freeman	October 29, 1974	1310-1729-0511
An autopsy reveals that the victim of a gangland slaying led a double life. Jessica Walter, Sam Elliott and Abe Vigoda guest star. Real-life Honolulu Mayor Frank Fasi has a cameo. NOTE: This is the last sequential appearance of Al Harrington as Ben Kokua. After this episode, he appears in sporadic episodes for the remainder of the season and is removed from the opening credits of episodes he does not appear in.
154	9	"How to Steal a Masterpiece"	Jack Lord	Bud Freeman	November 5, 1974	1310-1729-0517
Thieves break through three security systems to steal art from a millionaire. Gail Strickland, George Voskovec and Luther Adler guest star. NOTE: Al Harrington does not appear in this episode. Doug Mossman begins his regular series appearance as Frank Kamana.
155	10	"A Gun for McGarrett"	Bruce Bilson	Alvin Sapinsley	November 26, 1974	1310-1729-0515
In his search for the mobsters who injured him, McGarrett becomes romantically involved with a lovely fellow victim. Carol White and Ivor Barry guest star. NOTE: Al Harrington does not appear in this episode.
156	11	"Welcome to Our Branch Office"	Charles S. Dubin	Jerome Coopersmith	December 3, 1974	1310-1729-0512
A businessman accuses the Five-O squad of demanding $100,000 in protection from him, and McGarrett suspects that impostors of him and his team have duped the businessman. Cameron Mitchell and Frank Gorshin guest star. NOTE: James MacArthur plays both Danny and his impostor. Doug Mossman appears as nightclub owner Al Shatner.
157	12	"Presenting...In the Center Ring...Murder"	Charles S. Dubin	Jerome Coopersmith	December 10, 1974	1310-1729-0516
A traveling circus provides spy Wo Fat with the opportunity to attack a visiting Chinese foreign minister who is under Five-O's protection. Khigh Dhiegh, James Hong guest stars. NOTE: Al Harrington does not appear in this episode.
158	13	"Hara-Kiri: Murder"	Paul Stanley	Norman Lessing	December 31, 1974	1310-1729-0513
McGarrett investigates the murder of a wealthy Japanese business man which was so done as to resemble an act of hara-kiri (seppuku).
159	14	"Bones of Contention"	Douglas Green	Alvin Sapinsley	January 7, 1975	1310-1729-0523
A Honolulu death is linked to the disappearance of a valuable human fossil (Peking Man) from China just before Pearl Harbor. Vic Tayback and Keene Curtis guest star. NOTE: Al Harrington does not appear in this episode.
160	15	"Computer Killer"	Alf Kjellin	S : Larry Brody; S/T : Tim Maschler	January 14, 1975	1310-1729-0514
A computer programmed with erroneous information points McGarrett's murder investigation to the wrong person. NOTE: Al Harrington does not appear in this episode.
161	16	"A Woman's Work is with a Gun"	Douglas Green	Glen Olson & Rod Baker	January 21, 1975	1310-1729-0519
A trio of debt-plagued women go out and rob tourist buses for money. NOTE: Al Harrington does not appear in this episode.
162	17	"Small Witness, Large Crime"	Bruce Bilson	Orville H. Hampton	January 28, 1975	1310-1729-0524
A deputy public defender criticizes McGarrett after he arrests a poor child (who has witnessed a murder, and is being taken into custody for his own protection) for a petty theft. France Nuyen and Bert Convy guest star. NOTE: Al Harrington does not appear in this episode.
163	18	"Ring of Life"	John Peyser	Tim Maschler	February 4, 1975	1310-1729-0522
Five priceless figurines are stolen and a million dollar reward sets off a chain of murder. Don Knight and Harvey Jason guest stars. NOTE: Al Harrington does not appear in this episode.
164	19	"A Study in Rage"	Allen Reisner	Martin Roth	February 11, 1975	1310-1729-0518
An unfinished painting leads Five-0 to a psycho (Richard Hatch) who murdered two doctors and a wealthy mainland business man. Gretchen Corbett guest stars. NOTE: Al Harrington does not appear in this episode.
165	20	"And the Horse Jumped Over the Moon"	Douglas Green	Larry Brody	February 18, 1975	1310-1729-0509
A heroin smuggler is slain before he can sell information to the police. Ed Flanders, Bruce Boxleitner (making his second guest appearance this season) and Jo Ann Harris guest star. NOTE: Al Harrington does not appear in this episode.
166	21	"Hit Gun for Sale"	John Peyser	Martin Roth	February 25, 1975	1310-1729-0525
McGarrett is out to stop a gang war by hunting down a hired gun. Nehemiah Persoff, Sal Mineo and Tommy Sands guest star. NOTE: Al Harrington does not appear in this episode.
167	22	"The Hostage"	Allen Reisner	Bud Freeman	March 11, 1975	1310-1729-0526
McGarrett clashes with a police captain over Five-O's handling of a hostage situation concerning a teenage girl hostage and emotionally unstable war veteran. Linda Purl and Scott Brady guest star. NOTE: Al Harrington does not appear in this episode.
168	23	"Diary of a Gun"	Douglas Green	Jerome Coopersmith	March 18, 1975	1310-1729-0521
A mysterious .25 caliber "Saturday night special" causes citizens to kill which leaves a bloody trail of four murders; a car hijacking, an accidental shooting, two holdups and misery. Five-O must find the gun and uncover the gun smugglers to stop the carnage. NOTE: Al Harrington does not appear in this episode. Final appearance of the character Frank Kamana.
169	24	"6,000 Deadly Tickets"	John Peyser	Leonard & Arlene Stadd	March 25, 1975	1310-1729-0508
A scheme forcing travel agents to purchase stolen airline tickets turns to murder when one refuses.
