= Hawaii Five-O (1968 TV series) season 5 =

Hawaii Five-O
- Season 5
- No. of episodes: 24

Release
- Original network: CBS
- Original release: September 12, 1972 – March 13, 1973

Season chronology
- ← Previous; Season 4 Next → Season 6

The fifth season of Hawaii Five-O premiered on September 12, 1972, and ended March 13, 1973. 24 episodes aired during this season. The Region 1 DVD was released on November 18, 2008. Herman Wedemeyer became a main cast member. This season also introduced Al Harrington as part of the main cast as police officer Ben Kokua, replacing the character of Kono (played by Zulu).

== Episodes ==
No. overall	No. in season	Title	Directed by	Written by	Original release date	Prod. code
98	1	"Death is a Company Policy"	Charles S. Dubin	Jerome Coopersmith	September 12, 1972	1729-0405
After officer Duke is implicated in the slaying of an underworld figure, McGarrett and the Five-O team must clear Duke and uncover the real killers. Michael Ansara and George Chakiris guest star. NOTE: The full name of Herman Wedemeyer's character Duke is revealed as Edward "Duke" Lukela (HPD badge number 270).
99	2	"Death Wish on Tantalus Mountain"	Allen Reisner	Jerome Coopersmith	September 19, 1972	1729-0411
When two of an egomanical racing car driver's mechanics are murdered, suspicion falls on the driver's glamorous fiancee. Ricardo Montalbán and Diana Muldaur guest star. A stock shot of a exploding car wrecks is from 4/1 "Highest Castle, Deepest Grave"
100	3	"You Don't Have to Kill to Get Rich--But it Helps."	Alf Kjellin	Abram S. Ginnes	September 26, 1972	1729-0409
A series of deaths of well-to-do businessmen gets Five-O involved in the investigation of a lucrative blackmail operation. William Shatner and Ric Marlow guest star.
101	4	"Pig in a Blanket"	Marvin Chomsky	Bill Stratton	October 3, 1972	1729-0404
After Danno shoots a teenager, a public outcry goes up to sacrifice him to public opinion. John Rubinstein guest stars.
102	5	"The Jinn Who Clears the Way"	Harry Falk	John D.F. Black	October 10, 1972	1729-0418
Wo Fat is suspected of being behind the theft of a secret ballistic missile device, and McGarrett uncovers a plot to get the device into the hands of the highest bidder. Wo Fat is arrested for espionage and murder by McGarrett, who in a last second twist ending receives a shocking secret from Jonathan Kaye (Joseph Sirola). Soon-Tek Oh appears as Tom Wong. Chin Ho Kelly's matenal uncle is head of the Wong tong. A shot of a hit and run accident would be repeated. NOTE: Final series appearance of Joseph Sirola as Jonathan Kaye.
103	6	"Fools Die Twice"	Michael O'Herilhy	Abram S. Ginnes	October 17, 1972	1729-0402
An Army officer devises a bizarre scheme to kidnap a top government scientist and collect a ransom of one million dollars in diamonds. Bill Edwards as Jonathan Kaye. Clu Gulager and Michael Conrad guest star. NOTE: Bill Edwards takes over the role of Jonathan Kaye and would continue the role until Season 10.
104	7	"Chain of Events"	Ron Winston	Jerome Coopersmith	October 24, 1972	1729-0407
The slaying of a public health official while conducting an investigation into venereal disease leads McGarrett into the world of politics and intrigue. Jay Stewart, Dirk Benedict, Mary Frann and Ray Buktenica guest star.
105	8	"Journey Out of Limbo"	Michael O'Herilhy	Frank Telford	October 31, 1972	1729-0401
Danno stumbles on a plot to assassinate a Chinese diplomat and suffers memory loss. McGarrett, Chin and Ben have to try to help him reconstruct the details. Philip Ahn and Keenan Wynn guest star in this episode.
106	9	"V for Vashon: The Son"	Charles S. Dubin	Alvin Sapinsley	November 14, 1972	1729-0412
107	10	"V for Vashon: The Son"	Charles S. Dubin	Alvin Sapinsley	November 21, 1972	1729-0413
108	11	"V for Vashon: The Son"	Charles S. Dubin	Alvin Sapinsley	November 28, 1972	1729-0414
Part 1: The son (Robert Drivas) of the head of a family-dominated crime syndicate (Harold Gould) masterminds a series of small-time robberies. Eventually McGarrett catches him, but it doesn't end there… Luther Adler also guest stars as the Vashon patriarch. Part 2: With his son shot dead by McGarrett, Honore Vashon (Harold Gould) and his father Dominic are determined to see the Five-O chief pay the ultimate price. Part 3: Dominic, with his grandson dead and his son in prison, sets in motion a scheme to frame McGarrett for the murder of a just-released drug pusher. NOTE: The sequel to this episode appears in Season 8, titled "The Case Against McGarrett".
109	12	"The Clock Struck Twelve"	Ron Winston	S : Leonard Freeman; T : Anthony Lawrence	December 5, 1972	1729-0410
McGarrett is assigned to preserve security and ensure an orderly trial after a series of bomb threats follows the arrest of a band of Hawaiian vigilantes.
110	13	"I'm a Family Crook--Don't Shoot!"	Bob Sweeney	Jerome Coopersmith	December 19, 1972	1729-0403
In this comic relief episode, a husband-and-wife team of con artists accidentally make a bigger score than they ever imagined. The problem is not only have they've ripped off a mobster who wants his money back -- and will gladly kill to do so-but they find themselves stalked by another crime gang after the money as well!.Andy Griffith, Joyce Van Patten and Harold Sakata guest stars.
111	14	"The Child Stealers"	Corey Allen	Larry Brody	January 2, 1973	1729-0417
Five-O investigates after children are kidnapped and sold to an attorney operating a child-stealing racket on the Mainland. Richard Hatch, Meg Foster, Richard Anderson and Jack Hogan guest stars.
112	15	"Thanks for the Honeymoon"	Richard Benedict	Mel Goldberg	January 9, 1973	1729-0418
An underworld fringe character (Patty Duke) agrees to turn state's evidence against a mobster (Lane Bradford) if McGarrett releases her from prison and arranges her wedding to the father (Larry Kert) of her unborn child. McGarrett reconnects with a former lover (Carol Lawrence).
113	16	"The Listener"	Richard Benedict	Meyer Dolinsky	January 16, 1973	1729-0421
A psychotic electronics wizard (Greg Mullavey) threatens a psychiatrist (Robert Foxworth) and his patients through wiretapping.
114	17	"Here Today, Gone Tonight"	Michael O'Herilhy	Jerome Coopersmith	January 23, 1973	1729-0419
Five-O has to solve the riddle of how a suspected killer (Monte Markham) can appear to be in two places at the same time.
115	18	"The Odd Lot Caper"	Michael O'Herilhy	T : Norman Lessing; S/T : Meyer Dolinsky	January 30, 1973	1729-0424
A brilliant but unscruplious businessman (Richard Basehart) conceives a daring and seemingly foolproof scheme to rob the Honolulu Stock Exchange. Jack Hogan guest stars.
116	19	"Will the Real Mr. Winkler Please Die?"	Michael O'Herilhy	Jerome Coopersmith	February 6, 1973	1729-0422
An obscure shopkeeper (Nehemiah Persoff) becomes the catalyst in a plot to assassinate a high-level Iron Curtain defector (Mark Lenard). Malachi Throne guest stars. NOTE: Bill Edwards as W.D. "Bill" Druthers.
117	20	"Little Girl Blue"	Bob Sweeney	S : Leonard Freeman; T : Mel Goldberg	February 13, 1973	1729-0423
Two ineffectual crooks (Jackie Coogan and Ron Feinberg) kidnap a little girl and hold her hostage on a hillside bunker. Tisha Sterling and Nina Foch guest stars. NOTE: Due to poor health, this was the final episode to be co-written by series creator Leonard Freeman. Same bunker location and footage used for "…And I Want Some Candy and a Gun That Shoots" (season 4, episode 6).
118	21	"Percentage"	Robert Butler	Norman Lessing	February 20, 1973	1729-0425
A travel agent operating gambling junkets is slain as a warning to his partners to stop competing for the gambling business. Milton Selzer and Carole Kai guest star. Kwan Hi Lim as Hank Yoshigo.
119	22	"Engaged to Be Buried"	Michael O'Herilhy	T : Ken Pettus; S/T : Bill Stratton	February 27, 1973	1729-0420
120	23	"The Diamond That Nobody Stole"	Charles S. Dubin	John Furia, Jr.	March 6, 1973	1729-0406
A cat burglar strikes at the home of a socially prominent island family, setting off a series of fast-moving events that lead to his death. It soon develops that the dowager at the center of these events belongs to a noble, if not royal, family and has plans for reinstating the overthrown monarchy of the nation of her birth. Eric Braeden and Beulah Quo guest stars.
121	24	"Jury of One"	Alf Kjellin	Ken Pettus	March 13, 1973	1729-0415
One of the jurors in a murder trial is being blackmailed to produce a hung jury, and Five-O has to find out the motive behind his consistent "not guilty" vote and prevent a mistrial.
