= Five Characters in Search of an Exit =

- The Twilight Zone episode
- Episode no.: Season 3 Episode 14
- Directed by: Lamont Johnson
- Teleplay by: Rod Serling
- Based on: "The Depository" by Marvin Petal
- Production code: 4805
- Original air date: December 22, 1961

Guest appearances
- William Windom as the Major; Murray Matheson as the Clown; Susan Harrison as the Ballet Dancer; Kelton Garwood as the Hobo; Clark Allen as the Bagpiper

Episode chronology
← Previous "Once Upon a Time"	Next → "A Quality of Mercy"
- The Twilight Zone (1959 TV series)

"Five Characters in Search of an Exit" is episode 79 of the television anthology series The Twilight Zone. It originally aired on December 22, 1961.

== Opening narration ==
Clown, hobo, ballet dancer, bagpiper, and an army major—a collection of question marks. Five improbable entities stuck together into a pit of darkness. No logic, no reason, no explanation; just a prolonged nightmare in which fear, loneliness, and the unexplainable walk hand in hand through the shadows. In a moment, we'll start collecting clues as to the whys, the whats, and the wheres. We will not end the nightmare, we'll only explain it—because this is the Twilight Zone.

== Plot ==
A uniformed U.S. Army major wakes up to find himself trapped inside a large metal cylinder, where he meets a hobo, a ballet dancer, a bagpiper, and a clown. All of them theorize wildly regarding their presence here, as no one remembers who they are or how they became trapped, and they do not seem to have any need for food or water. The major, being the newest arrival, is the most determined to escape. He is told there is no way of either breaking through or climbing up the cylinder, and his sword breaks when he tries to pierce the wall with it.

Eventually, the major suggests a plan to escape: forming a tower of people, each person on the other's shoulders. However, the dancer at the top of the tower is still a few inches short of the cylinder's top, and a loud clanging sound shakes the cylinder and sends the five tumbling to the ground. The major demands that they all make a promise to not leave the cylinder until everyone else has left.

Now even more determined, the major fashions a grappling hook from loose bits of clothing and the hilt of his broken sword. By reforming the tower, he manages to grapple onto the edge of the cylinder, only to tumble to the ground outside. Inside, the clown bemoans how the major left without them and will not rescue them if he ever returns, and surmises that the major was right about them being in Hell.

Just then a little girl picks up a doll from the snow, in the dress of an army major. The cylinder is a Christmas toy collection barrel for a girls' orphanage, and all five characters are dolls. The loud clanging was the ringing of a bell, used by a woman to attract donations; she tells the girl to return the doll to the barrel.

The five characters, now dolls with painted faces and glass eyes, lie unmoving. The ballet dancer nonetheless moves her hand to hold that of the major's as her eyes fill with tears.

== Closing narration ==
Just a barrel, a dark depository where are kept the counterfeit, make-believe pieces of plaster and cloth, wrought in a distorted image of human life. But this added hopeful note: perhaps they are unloved only for the moment. In the arms of children, there can be nothing but love. A clown, a tramp, a bagpipe player, a ballet dancer, and a Major. Tonight's cast of players on the odd stage—known as—The Twilight Zone.

== Cast ==
- Susan Harrison as Ballerina
- William Windom as Major
- Murray Matheson as Clown
- Kelton Garwood as Hobo
- Clark Allen as Bagpiper

== Episode notes ==
The episode's title is a variation on the Pirandello play Six Characters in Search of an Author and existentialist Sartre play No Exit, both of which served as inspiration for the script.

Dolls were specially crafted for the final shots to closely resemble the actors who had played the parts.

== Legacy ==
The episode was reportedly an inspiration for the 1997 film Cube. The TV series Felicity paid homage in its episode "Help for the Lovelorn"; both episodes were directed by Lamont Johnson. This episode would also serve as one of the inspirations for horror film director Damien Leone to create the character Art the Clown who serves as the main antagonist in Leone's Terrifier franchise.
