= William Windom (actor) =

American actor (1923–2012)

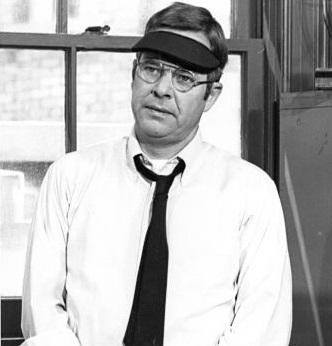
- Press photo of William Windom for My World and Welcome to It in 1972
- Born: September 28, 1923; Manhattan, New York City, U.S.
- Died: August 16, 2012 (aged 88); Woodacre, California, U.S.
- Occupation: Actor
- Years active: 1942–2006
- Spouses: Carol Keyser (m. 1947; div. 1955); Barbara Joyce (m. 1958; div. 1963); Barbara Goetz Clare (m. 1963; div. 1968); Jacqulyne Hopkins (m. 1969; div. 1975); Patricia Tunder (m. 1975)
- Children: 6
- Awards: 1970 Primetime Emmy Award for Outstanding Lead Actor in a Comedy Series

William Windom (September 28, 1923 – August 16, 2012) was an American actor. Known as a character actor of the stage and screen, he is famous for his recurring role as Dr. Seth Hazlitt alongside Angela Lansbury in the CBS mystery series Murder, She Wrote and his memorable guest role as Commodore Matt Decker in Star Trek.

Windom made his television debut in 1949 in the NBC anthology series The Philco Television Playhouse. He continued acting in shows such as Studio One, Masterpiece Playhouse, Omnibus, and Kraft Television Theatre. During this time, he also appeared on The Twilight Zone, Gunsmoke, Mission: Impossible, and Star Trek. He then gained acclaim in his television career for his portrayal of cartoonist John Monroe in the short-lived NBC sitcom My World and Welcome to It (1969–1970), winning him the Primetime Emmy Award for Outstanding Lead Actor in a Comedy Series.

He then guest-starred in various programs, including Columbo, Night Gallery, Marcus Welby M.D., and Quincy M.E. before gaining acclaim for his recurring role on the CBS mystery series Murder, She Wrote (1986–1996), portraying Dr. Seth Hazlitt of Cabot Cove opposite Angela Lansbury. During this time, he also appeared on other programs, including St. Elsewhere, Magnum, P.I., Newhart, L.A. Law, and Murphy Brown, and voiced Uncle Chuck in Sonic the Hedgehog. His final television appearances include roles in Ally McBeal and The District.

Windom is also known for his film roles in the Academy Award-winning movie To Kill a Mockingbird (1962), The Americanization of Emily (1964), The Detective (1968), Brewster McCloud (1970), Escape from the Planet of the Apes (1971), Planes, Trains and Automobiles (1987), She's Having a Baby (1988), Uncle Buck (1989), Miracle on 34th Street (1994), and True Crime (1999).

== Early life ==
Windom was born in Manhattan in New York City, the son of Paul Windom, an architect, and Isobel Wells (née Peckham). He was a descendant of the United States Secretary of the Treasury of the same name. He attended Williams College and enlisted in the U.S. Army. He participated in the Army Specialized Training Program, studying at The Citadel, Antioch College, and the University of Kentucky.

Windom became a paratrooper with Company B, 1st Battalion 508th Parachute Infantry Regiment, 82nd Airborne Division. While stationed in Frankfurt during the Allied occupation of Germany, he enrolled in Biarritz American University in France and became involved in theater.

== Career ==
His screen career began in the 1950s. Windom appeared in various TV series, including Omnibus and Robert Montgomery Presents. He continued guest-starring in series during the 1960s including playing The Major in "Five Characters in Search of an Exit", a 1961 episode of The Twilight Zone; Windom considered this guest appearance as his West Coast television debut. He later reported that Richard Widmark was originally offered the role, but when Widmark learned that the pay was only to be $1,000, he turned it down. Actress Susan Harrison, who played the Ballerina, got first billing, while Windom got second.

His first leading role came in the sitcom The Farmer's Daughter (1963–1966), a series based on the 1947 film about a young Minnesota woman (played by Inger Stevens) who became the housekeeper for a widowed congressman (Windom). It ran for three seasons.

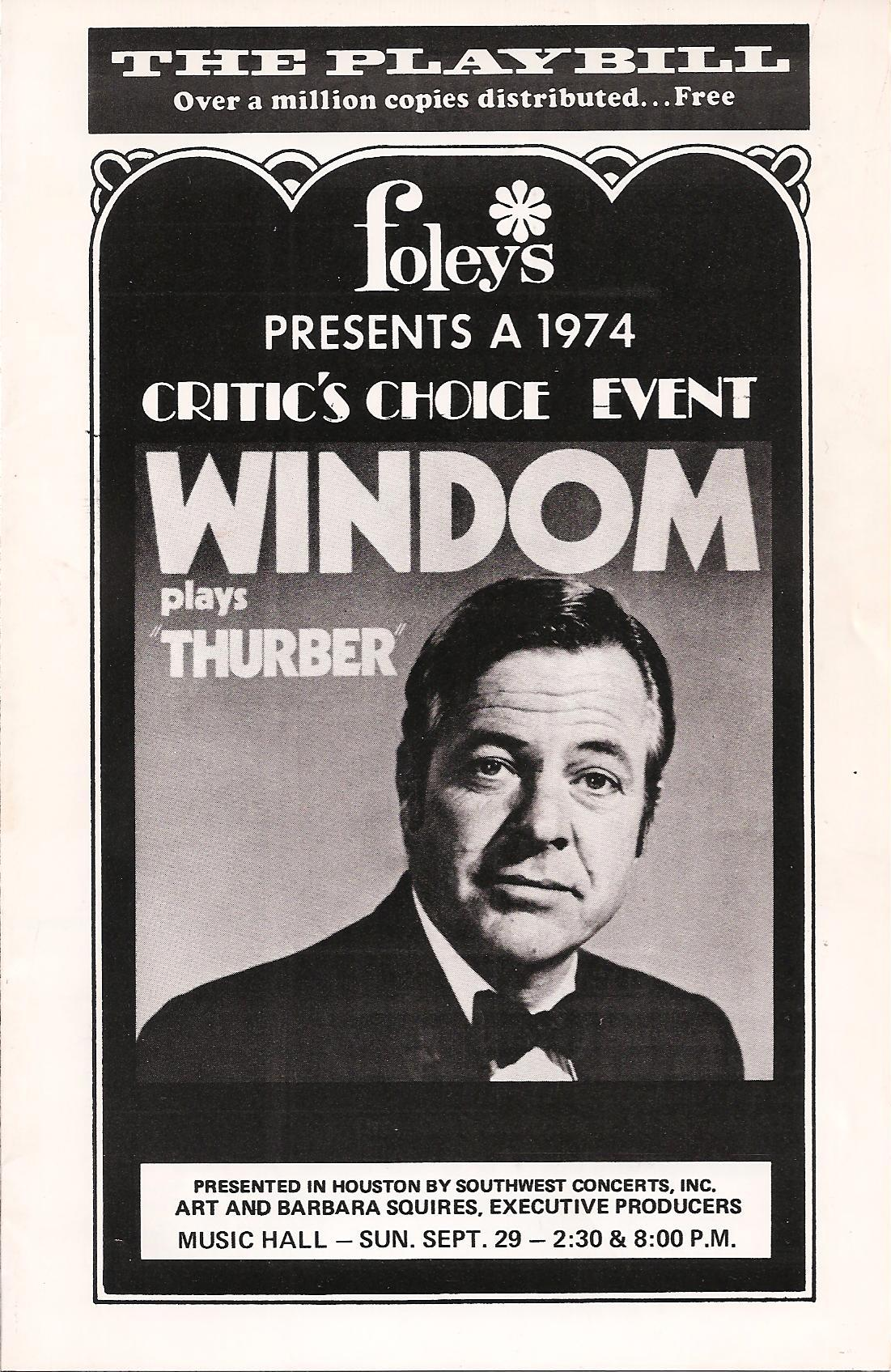
Playbill: Windom Plays Thurber

Windom's first role in film was alongside Gregory Peck in the Oscar-winning movie To Kill a Mockingbird (1962); he played Horace Gilmer, the prosecutor of Tom Robinson (Brock Peters).

He appeared on The Donna Reed Show, Gunsmoke, Star Trek, Mission: Impossible (four episodes), and Ironside.

In Star Trek, he played Commodore Matt Decker, commander of the doomed USS Constellation, in the 1967 episode "The Doomsday Machine", a role he reprised nearly 40 years later for Star Trek: New Voyages. He played a recurring role (three episodes) in "The Invaders" in 1967. In 1968, Windom guest-starred on Ironside in the episode "Trip to Hashbury."

Also in 1968, Windom starred alongside Peter Falk and Gene Barry in the TV movie Prescription: Murder, the pilot for the TV series Columbo. He starred in another episode of the series titled "Short Fuse" in 1972. In 1971 he played a supporting role alongside Jimmy Stewart, George Kennedy, and Kurt Russell in the Columbia production Fools' Parade.

Windom starred with Frank Sinatra in the film The Detective (1968), playing a homophobic killer, a role appreciated in The New York Times. The following year, he had the lead role as cartoonist John Monroe in the sitcom My World and Welcome to It. Although the series only aired for one season, he won the 1970 Primetime Emmy Award for Outstanding Lead Actor in a Comedy Series.

In 1971, Windom guest-starred as a victim of blackmail on Cannon in the episode "Death Chain". In 1974, he guest-starred as Marklund, a grieving father and kidnapper, on Chopper One in the episode "The Drop". In 1975, he guest-starred as George Kane, a desperate drug dealer, in the series finale of Mannix in the episode "Hardball".

In 1980, he appeared as Amos Krebbs, the alleged father of Ray Krebbs, on the hit primetime television drama Dallas on the episode "The Fourth Son".

Windom toured the country in a one-man James Thurber show. Afterward, he filmed the pilot for a new series Is There a Doctor in the House? with Rosemary Forsyth that was not picked up by a network.

Windom joined Murder, She Wrote in October 1985 as Dr. Seth Hazlitt. He had previously appeared on the series as a guest star playing another character in April 1985. The producers invited him thereafter to return at the beginning of the second season in a continuing role. Windom briefly left the show in 1990 to work on the first television version of Parenthood, based on the 1989 film of the same name, playing the role of patriarch Frank Buckman—a role played by Jason Robards in the film and, later, Craig T. Nelson in the second TV version. The show was canceled after 12 episodes and Windom returned to Murder, She Wrote as a semiregular. Windom appeared in 53 episodes of Murder, She Wrote, second only to Lansbury.

Windom continued to appear in film and TV guest roles during the 1990s and 2000s, including Sommersby (1993), Miracle on 34th Street (1994), and Clint Eastwood's True Crime (1999), and series including Ally McBeal (2000) and The District (2001). His final acting appearance came in the 2005 drama Yesterday's Dreams.

== Personal life ==
Windom married Carol Keyser in New York City in August 1947. They worked together and he worked for her father selling insurance for three years. They divorced in December 1955. In 1958, he married actress Barbara Joyce. She was six years older than Windom. He soon moved to California for work. Windom said the marriage lasted three years, although the divorce was not finalized until 1963. A few weeks later, he married his third wife, Barbara Clare. She was the granddaughter of MGM's founder, Louis B. Mayer, and 11 years Windom's junior. He became stepfather to Barbara's two daughters. His first child, Rachel, was born in 1964. Windom and Barbara divorced in 1968. In October 1969, he married his fourth wife, Jacqulyn D. Hopkins, 19 years his junior. They had two daughters: Heather Juliet (b. 1970) and Hope Teresa (b. 1973).

In 1974, Windom met Patricia (Fehrle) Tunder while shooting a TV movie; 12 years his junior, she was working for the production company at the time. Almost a year later, in July 1975, he filed for divorce from Jacqulyn. Windom married Patricia in 1975. In 1978, Windom welcomed his final child, a son named Rebel Russell.

Windom was a tournament chess player, a sailor, a tennis player, and a life member of the United States Chess Federation.

=== Death ===
Windom died on August 16, 2012, at age 88 at his home in Woodacre, California, from congestive heart failure.

== Filmography ==
=== Films ===
Year	Title	Role	Notes
1962	To Kill a Mockingbird	Horace Gilmer – Prosecutor	Film debut
1963	Cattle King	Harry Travers	
1963	For Love or Money	Sam Travis	
1963	One Man's Way	Rev. Clifford Peale	
1964	The Americanization of Emily	Captain Harry Spaulding	
1967	Hour of the Gun	Texas Jack Vermillion	
1968	The Detective	Colin MacIver	
1968	The Angry Breed	Vance Patton	
1969	The Gypsy Moths	John Brandon	
1970	Brewster McCloud	Haskell Weeks	
1971	The Mephisto Waltz	Dr. Roger West	
1971	Escape from the Planet of the Apes	The President	
1971	Fools' Parade	Roy K. Sizemore	
1972	Now You See Him, Now You Don't	Prof. Lufkin	
1972	The Man	Arthur Eaton	
1975	Stevie, Samson and Delilah	Narrator	
1976	Echoes of a Summer	Dr. Hallet	
1978	Mean Dog Blues	Victor Lacey	
1978	Goodbye, Franklin High	Clifford Armer	
1981	Separate Ways	Huey Block	
1983	Last Plane Out	James Caldwell	
1984	Prince Jack	Ferguson	
1984	Grandview, U.S.A.	Bob Cody	
1985	Space Rage	Gov. Torah	
1987	Means and Ends	Burt	
1987	Funland	Angus Perry	
1987	Planes, Trains and Automobiles	Mr. Bryant	Uncredited
1987	Pinocchio and the Emperor of the Night	Puppetino (voice)	
1987	Dead Aim	McWhorter	
1988	She's Having a Baby	Russ Bainbridge	
1989	Uncle Buck	Mr. Hatfield (voice)	
1991	Committed	Dr. Magnus Quilly	
1993	Sommersby	Reverend Powell	
1994	Miracle on 34th Street	C.F. Cole	
1996	Children of the Corn IV: The Gathering	Doc Rob Larson	
1999	True Crime	Neil, the bartender	
2000	The Thundering 8th	Old Joe	
2001	Early Bird Special	Fred	
2002	Raising Dead	Chief Silton	
2003	Dopamine	Tom – Rand's Father	
2003	Dismembered	Police Capt. Hart	
2005	Yesterday's Dreams	Herb Radford	Final film role

=== Television ===
Year	Title	Role	Notes
1949	The Philco Television Playhouse	Tybalt/Dennis	2 episodes
1950	Lights Out	Performer	Episode: "The Heart of Jonathan O'Rourke"
1950	Masterpiece Playhouse	King Richard III	Episode: "Richard III"
1950–1951	Martin Kane, Private Eye	Performer	1 episode
1950–1951	Famous Jury Trials	Performer	1 episode
1950	Studio One	Pilgrim	Episode: "The Scarlet Letter"
1950–1951	Cameo Theatre	Performer	Various episodes
1950–1951	Tom Corbett, Space Cadet	Performer	1 episode
1951	The Plainclothesman	Performer	1 episode
1951–1957	Robert Montgomery Presents	Various Roles	4 episodes
1954–1955	The Secret Storm	Performer	Various episodes
1955	Appointment with Adventure	Dan Vance	Episode: "Relative Strangers"
1955	Omnibus	Various	2 episodes
1957	Hotel Cosmopolitan	Performer	Various episodes
1958	Dial M for Murder	Max Halliday	Television Movie
1960	The Play of the Week	Bob	Episode: "Seven Time Monday"
1960	Guestward, Ho!	Performer	Episode: "The Christmas Spirit"
1961–1962	Surfside 6	Shrewdie McDoug/Robby Brooks	2 episodes
1961–1962	The Donna Reed Show	Ed Perkins/David Adams	2 episodes
1961	The Twilight Zone	The Major	Episode: "Five Characters in Search of an Exit"
1961–1972	Gunsmoke	Lee Sharkey/Paul Hill/Ira Spratt	3 episodes
1961	Armstrong Circle Theatre	Performer	Episode: "Black Market Babies"
1961	The Detectives	Sutter	Episode: "Tobey's Place"
1961	The New Breed	Warren Giles	Episode: "The Compulsion to Confess"
1961	Checkmate	Peter Morell	Episode: "Through a Dark Glass"
1961	Cheyenne	Dennis Carter	Episode: "Legacy of the Lost"
1961	Ben Casey	Dr. Bill Owen	Episode: "The Sweet Kiss of Madness"
1962–1963	77 Sunset Strip	Calvin Otterman; Cuthbert Carmichael	2 episodes
1962	Mrs. G. Goes to College	Ernie	Episode: "Goodbye Mr. Howell"
1962	Bus Stop	Ed Henderson	Episode: "The Ordeal of Kevin Brooke"
1962	Follow the Sun	Meredith St. John	Episode: "A Ghost in Her Gazebo"
1962	Thriller	Lou Walters	Episode: "Man of Mystery"
1962	Kraft Television Theatre	Vincent Fuller	Episode: "In Close Pursuit"
1962	The Gallant Men	Private Jake Miller	Episode: Pilot
1962	The Lucy Show	Henry Taylor	Episode: "Lucy Digs Up a Date"
1962	Seven Times Monday	Bob	Television Movie
1962	Stoney Burke	Reese Ludlow	Episode: "A Matter of Pride"
1963–1966	The Farmer's Daughter	Congressman Glen Morley	101 episodes
1963	Combat!	Captain Lew Anders	Episode: "Off Limits"
1963	The Twilight Zone	Dr. Charles Wallman	Episode: "Miniature"
1963	Empire	Lawrence Rowan	Episode: "Hidden Asset"
1966	The F.B.I.	Anton Christopher	Episode: "The Assassin"
1966	Twelve O'Clock High	Lt. Col. Bill Christy	Episode: "Gauntlet of Fire"
1966	The Wild Wild West	Ben Victor	Episode: "The Night of the Flying Pie Plate"
1966	Iron Horse	Colin McCrory	Episode: "Town Full of Fear"
1967	Mission: Impossible	Deputy Premier Milos Pavel	Episode: "The Train"
1967	Run for Your Life	Ralph Wilson	Episode: "The List of Alice McKenna"
1967	The F.B.I.	David Roger "Davey" Spiers	Episode: "By Force and Violence"
1967	The Fugitive	Professor Fritz Simpson	Episode: "The Ivy Maze"
1967	Mission: Impossible	Alex Cresnic	Episode: "The Widow"
1967	Star Trek	Commodore Matt Decker	Episode: "The Doomsday Machine"
1967	The Invaders	Maj. Rick Graves	Episode: "Doomsday Minus One"
1967	Custer	Clark Samson	Episode: "Under Fire"
1967	Gentle Ben	James Harkness	Episode: "Jennifer"
1967	Dundee and the Culhane	Robert Campbell	Episode: "The Thy Brother's Keeper Brief"
1967	The Invaders	Michael Tressider	Episode: "Summit Meeting"
1967	Judd, for the Defense	Ira Creighton	Episode: "Commitment"
1968–1970	The Name of the Game	Charlie Ross/Mr. John Price	Episode: 2 episodes
1968–1972	Ironside	Eldon Chase/Judge Van Buren	Episode: 2 episodes
1968	Mannix	Calvin Norris	Episode: "The Girl in the Frame"
1968	The F.B.I.	Howard Converse	Episode: "The Nightmare"
1968	Columbo	Burt Gordon	Episode: "Prescription: Murder"
1968	Bonanza	Marshal Passmore	Episode: "Star Crossed"
1968	The Virginian	The Doctor	Season 6 Episode 11: "To Bear Witness"
1969	The Virginian	Joss Cardine	Episode: "Halfway Back from Hell"
1969–1970	My World and Welcome to It	John Monroe	26 episodes
1969	Mannix	Nils Sanderson	Episode: "Shadow of a Man"
1969–1974	Hawaii Five-O	Ossie Connors/Harlan Henderson	2 episodes
1969–1976	Medical Center	Various roles	5 episodes
1969	The Mod Squad	Fred Williams	Episode: "Hello Mother, My Name Is Julie"
1969	Lancer	Claude Buttermere	Episode: "The Great Humbug"
1969	The Outcasts	Lafe Partman	Episode: "The Stalking Devil"
1969	The Outsider	Bernard Christie	Episode: "Service for One"
1969	CBS Playhouse	Art Richardson	Episode: "Shadow Game"
1969	My Friend Tony	Phil Wiser	Episode: "The Shortest Courtship"
1970–1972	Love, American Style	Charlie/Harrison/Hubert	3 episodes
1970–1976	Insight	God/Mr.Clark/Todd	3 episodes
1970	House on Greenapple Road	Paul Durstine	Television movie
1970	The Forty-Eight Hour Mile	Bernard Christie	Television movie
1971	The Virginian	Foster Bonham	Episode: "The Politician"
1971	That Girl	Joseph Nelson	Episode: "That Script"
1971	Mission: Impossible	Stu Gorman	Episode: "Blues"
1971	Big Fish, Little Fish	William Baker	Television Movie
1971	Assault on the Wayne	Captain Frank Reardon	Television Movie
1971	Alias Smith and Jones	Jeremiah Daley	Episode: "Wrong Train to Brimstone"
1971	Men at Law	Dr. Simon Branby	Episode: "Let the Dier Beware"
1971	Is There a Doctor in the House?	Dr. Tim Newley	Unsold television pilot
1971	All in the Family	Eddie Frazier	Episode: "Success Story"
1971	Escape	Dr. Henry Walding	Television Movie
1971	Cannon	Harry Kendrix	Episode: "Death Chain"
1971	A Taste of Evil	Harold Jennings	Television Movie
1971	Marriage: Year One	Warren Duden	Television Movie
1971	Cade's County	Frank Leonard	Episode: "Violent Echo"
1971	Marcus Welby, M.D.	Dr. Sam Mason	Episode: "Ask Me Again Tomorrow"
1971	Night Gallery	Randy Lane	Episode: "They're Tearing Down Tim Riley's Bar"
1971	Robert Young Presents the Family	Performer	1 episode
1971	The Man and the City	Congressman Ralph Lawson	Episode: "The Deadly Fountain"
1971	The Homecoming: A Christmas Story	Charlie Snead	Television Movie
1971	Jamison's Kids	Performer	Pilot episode
1972–1976	The Streets of San Francisco	Various roles	3 episodes
1972	Columbo	Everett Logan	Episode: "Short Fuse"
1972	Second Chance	Stan Petryk	Television Movie
1972	The Jimmy Stewart Show	Mike Carruthers	Episode: "Old School Ties"
1972	The New Healers	Mr. Farrigan	Television Movie
1972	Banacek	Harry Wexler	Episode: "Projet Phoenix"
1972	Ghost Story	Charlie Pender	Episode: "The Summer House"
1972	The Rookies	Frank Queenlin	Episode: "Time Is the Fire"
1972	A Great American Tragedy	Rob Stewart	Television Movie
1972	Pursuit	Robert Phillips	Television Movie
1972	Night Gallery	Prof. Putnam	Episode: "Little Girl Lost"
1972	The F.B.I.	Elias Devon	Episode: "The Jug Marker"
1973–1974	The Girl with Something Extra	Stuart Kline	2 episodes
1973	The Partridge Family	Uncle Erwin	Episode: "Bedknobs and Drumsticks"
1973	Mission: Impossible	Paul Mitchell	Episode: "The Fighter"
1973	The Girls of Huntington House	Sam Duton	Television Movie
1973	Winesburg, Ohio	Dr. Reefy	Television Movie
1973	The Flip Wilson Show	Self	1 episode
1973	The Delphi Bureau	Broker	Episode: "The Terror Broker Project"
1973	Dr. Simon Locke/Police Surgeon	Delbert Norman Woodward	Episode: "Losers, Weepers"
1973	Tenafly	Weyburn	Episode: "The Cash and Carry Caper"
1973	Griff	Christopher Woods	Episode: "The Last Ballad"
1973	Hawkins	Joe Hamilton	Episode: "A Life for a Life"
1974–1975	Petrocelli	Alan Brewster/Alex Mayberry	2 episodes
1974–1977	McMillan & Wife	Whalen/Ted Hoffenstein	2 episodes
1974–1977	Police Woman	Ted Adrian/Silky Chamberlain	2 episodes
1974	Chopper One	Marklund	Episode: "The Drop"
1974	Murder in the First Person Singular	Alfred Emerson	Television Movie
1974	The Day the Earth Moved	Judge Tom Backsler	Television Movie
1974	Male Menopause: The Pause That Perplexes	Performer	PBS Special
1975–1981	Barney Miller	George Webber/Voice of Cellmate	Episode: 3 episodes
1975	The Abduction of Saint Anne	Ted Morrisey	Television Movie
1975	Lucas Tanner	Ed Michaelson	Episode: "Shattered"
1975	Journey from Darkness	Dr. Cavaliere	Television Movie
1975	Mannix	George Kane	Episode: "Hardball"
1975	S.W.A.T.	Ross Collins	Episode: "A Coven of Killers"
1975	Guilty or Innocent: The Sam Sheppard Murder Case	Walt Adamson	Television Movie
1975	Doctors' Hospital	Dr. Ralph Keyes	Episode: "Surgeon, Heal Thyself"
1976	Bridger	Sen. Daniel Webster	Television Movie
1976	Doc	Dr. Pike	Episode: "Come Scrub with Me"
1976	Richie Brockelman: The Missing 24 Hours	Arthur Springfield	Television Movie
1976	The Bionic Woman	Warfield	Episode: "Black Magic"
1976	Gibbsville	Charlie Paxton	Episode: "Saturday Night"
1976	The Feather and Father Gang	General Northrup	Episode: "Two-Star Killer"
1976	Once an Eagle	Gen. Duke K Pulleyne	Miniseries
1976	The Tony Randall Show	Hamilton Kiss	Episode: "Case: Money vs. Stature"
1976	Heck's Angels	Col. Gregory Heck	Pilot Episode
1977	Seventh Avenue	John Meyers	Miniseries
1977	Hunter	Josef Patel	Episode: "The Lysenko Syndrome"
1977	Quincy, M.E.	Arthur Brandeis	Episode: "The Hot Dog Murder"
1977	Family	Howard Stone	Episode: "An Endangered Species"
1977	The Wonderful World of Disney	Phil Wainwright	Episode: "The Bluegrass Special"
1977	The Oregon Trail	Packy Devlin	2 episodes
1977	Kojak	K.C. Milano	Episode: "Once More from Birdland"
1978	Hunters of the Reef	Panama Cassidy	Television Movie
1978	W.E.B.	Paul Brisbane	Episode: "Good Night and Good Luck"
1979–1982	Trapper John, M.D.	Harry Duvall/Theodore Rankin	2 episodes
1979–1983	The Love Boat	Bill Kelly/Harold Wallingford	3 episodes
1979	Brothers and Sisters	Larry Krandall	12 episodes
1979	Blind Ambition	Richard Kleindienst	Miniseries
1980	Portrait of a Rebel: The Remarkable Mrs. Sanger	Mons. Soldini	Television Movie
1980	Landon Landon & Landon	Ben Landon	Pilot episode
1980	Dallas	Amos Krebbs	2 episodes
1981	Walking Tall	Matthew Whittaker	Episode: "The Protectors of the People"
1981	Quick & Quiet	Thaddeus Charles "T.C." Cooper	Pilot episode
1981	The Incredible Hulk	Sgt. Jack Keeler	Episode: "East Winds"
1981	Foul Play	Franklin Mills	Episode: "Play It Again Tuck"
1981	100 Years of Golden Hits	Thomas Edison	TV special
1981	One Day at a Time	Mr. Tiller	Episode: "Caveat Emptor"
1981	Leave 'em Laughing	Smiley Jenkins	Television Movie
1981	Side Show	Byron Gage	Television Movie
1981	Flamingo Road	Charlie Banks	Episode: "The Stranger"
1982	A House Divided: Denmark Vesey's Rebellion	Governor Thomas Bennett, Jr.	Television Movie
1982–1983	Matt Houston	Dr. Walter Belkamp	2 episodes
1982	Fantasy Island	Bill Ackland	Episode: "Daddy's Little Girl/The Whistle"
1982	Desperate Lives	Dr. Jarvis	Television Movie
1982	The Rules of Marriage	George Olsen	Television Movie
1982	Hart to Hart	Charles Baines	Episode: "With This Hart, I Thee Wed"
1982	The Suzanne Somers Show	Landlord	Unaired Pilot episode
1983	The Greatest American Hero	Henry Williams	Episode: "Live at Eleven"
1983	The A-Team	Al Massey	Episode: "Mexican Slayride"
1983	Mama's Family	Woody Miller	Episode: "Mama's Boyfriend"
1983	The Tom Swift and Linda Craig Mystery Hour	Bronco Mallory	Television Movie
1983	The Facts of Life	Pete Dawson	Episode: "Store Games"
1983	Lottery!	Arthur	Episode: "Boston: False Illusion"
1983	Automan	Judge Alexander Farnsworth	Episode: "Staying Alive While Running a High Flashdance Fever"
1984	St. Elsewhere	Charlie Halloran	Episode: "In Sickness and in Health"
1984	Simon & Simon	Dr. Lloyd – Chief of Surgery	Episode: "Under the Knife"
1984	Why Me?	General	Television Movie
1984	Reading Rainbow	Self	Episode: "Hot Air Henry"
1984	The Yellow Rose	Mayor Virgil Mapes	Episode: "Far Side of Fear"
1984	Off Sides (Pigs vs. Freaks)	Mayor Malcolm Wallwood	Television Movie
1984	Pink Panther and Sons	Dr. Marcus Wealthy/Ticket Seller	Voice; Episode: "Rocko's Last Round"
1984	Velvet	Government Official	Television Movie
1984	Hot Pursuit	Performer	Episode: "Twilight Home"
1984	Hunter	Commissioner Larry Crenshaw	Episode: "The Hot Grounder"
1985–1996	Murder, She Wrote	Sam Breen/Dr. Seth Hazlitt	Recurring Role; 53 episodes
1985	Highway to Heaven	Rev. David Stearns	Episode: "A Child of God"
1985	Surviving: A Family in Crisis	Dr. Madsen	Television Movie
1985	Hotel	Uncle Ray	Episode: "Anniversary"
1985	Hardcastle and McCormick	James Maxwell	Episode: "Surprise on Seagull Beach"
1985	Dirty Work	Cmdr. Leevanhoek	Pilot
1985	The Jetsons	Saturn Cyclops	Episode: "Elroy in Wonderland"
1985	Airwolf	Lou Stappleford	Episode: "Eagles"
1985	Knight Rider	Wayne Altfield	Episode: "Knight Racer"
1985	Glitter	Performer	1 Episode
1986	Magnum, P.I.	Captain James T. Lyle	Episode: "All Thieves on Deck"
1986	Comedy Factory	Herb Medlock	Episode: "Moscow Bureau"
1986	There Must Be a Pony	Lee Hertzig	Television Movie
1987	Mathnet	Judge Herman Hoffman	Episode: "The Trial of George Frankly"
1987	Square One Television	Judge Hoffman	3 episodes
1987	Newhart	Lew Brooney	Episode: "Good-Bye & Good Riddance, Mr. Chips"
1987	Sky Commanders	'Cutter' Kling (voice)	2 episodes
1987	Dennis the Menace	Mr. George Wilson	Television Movie
1989	Have Faith	Alex	Episode: "Letters from Home"
1990–1991	Parenthood	Frank Buckman	12 episodes
1990	His & Hers	Doug's Father	Episode: "Just Plain Bill"
1990	Back to Hannibal: The Return of Tom Sawyer and Huckleberry Finn	Judge Thatcher	Television Movie
1990	Amen	Nick St. Nicholas	2 episodes
1991	Babes	Darryl Kloner	Episode: "All Bummed Out"
1991	The Fanelli Boys	Ernie	2 episodes
1991	Chance of a Lifetime	Dr. Edelman	Television Movie
1992	L.A. Law	Charles Flanagan	Episode: "Diet, Diet My Darling"
1992	Batman: The Animated Series	Ethan Clark (voice)	Episode: "Prophecy of Doom"
1992	Goof Troop	Uncle Bob	Episode: "Major Goof"
1992	Camp Candy	voice	1 Episode
1993–1994	Sonic the Hedgehog	Uncle Chuck (voice)	25 episodes
1993	Attack of the 50 Ft. Woman	Hamilton Cobb	Television Movie
1994	Murphy Brown	Ross Bowen	Episode: "Be Careful What You Wish For"
1995	Burke's Law	Dale Montrose	Episode: "Who Killed the Tennis Ace?"
1996	Fugitive X: Innocent Target	Uncle Billy	Television Movie
1996	Working Guy	Stockdale	Unaired Pilot
1998	Boy Meets World	Ned	Episode: "Ain't College Great?"
1999	Judging Amy	Prof. Barnett	Episode: "Witch Hunt"
1999	Chicken Soup for the Soul	Judge	Episode: "Rescued"
2000	Ally McBeal	Henderson Porter	Episode: "The Man with the Bag"
2001	Providence	Harold Joyce	Episode: "The Invisible Man"
2001	The District	Harlan Kirby Sr.	Episode: "Bulldog's Ghost"
2002	JAG	Fmr. Chief of Naval Operations	Episode: "Need to Know"
2004	Star Trek: New Voyages	Commodore Matt Decker	Episode: "In Harm's Way"

== Theatre ==
Year	Title	Role	Venue
1942	The Royal Family	Oscar Wolfe	Connecticut College for Women
1945	Richard III	Richard III	American University, Biarritz France
1946	Richard III	Richard III	Fordham University, New York City
1946	King Henry VIII	Earl of Surrey	International Theatre, Broadway
1946	What Every Woman Knows	Ensemble	International Theatre, Broadway
1946	John Gabriel Borkman	Erhart Borkman	International Theatre, Broadway
1946	Androcles and the Lion	Retiarius	International Theatre, Broadway
1947	Yellow Jack	Pvt. McClelland	International Theatre, Broadway
1947	Alice in Wonderland	The White Rabbit/Man in the Paper Hat	Majestic Theatre, Broadway
1947	Alice in Wonderland	The White Rabbit/Man in the Paper Hat	Boston Opera House
1947	Dream Girl	cast	The Cape Playhouse
1947	The Marquise	cast	The Cape Playhouse
1947	Joan of Lorraine	poet	The Cape Playhouse
1948	The Voice of the Turtle	Bill Page	Brookfield Theatre for the Arts
1948	My Sister Eileen	janitor	Brookfield Theatre for the Arts
1949	Romeo and Juliet	Romeo	Fordham University, New York City
1949	The Jailor's Wench	cast	The Cape Playhouse
1950	Light Up the Sky	author	Southbury Playhouse, Southbury, Conn.
1950	Blithe Spirit	Dr. Bradman	Southbury Playhouse, Southbury, Conn.
1950	It's a Wise Child	cast	Southbury Playhouse, Southbury, Conn.
1950	Meet the Wife	boyfriend	Southbury Playhouse, Southbury, Conn.
1950	The Three-Cornered Moon	cast	Southbury Playhouse, Southbury, Conn.
1950	The Vinegar Tree	cast	Southbury Playhouse, Southbury, Conn.
1950	Your Uncle Dudley	man in love with niece	Southbury Playhouse, Southbury, Conn.
1950	When the Bough Breaks	Bob Sanford	The Master Institute Theatre
1951	Charm	Joe the drug clerk	Southbury Playhouse, Southbury, Conn.
1951–1953	Bell, Book and Candle	Nicky Holroyd, a warlock	National Tour
1953	A Girl Can Tell	David, a voice on the telephone	Royale Theatre, Broadway
1954	Claudia	David	Putnam Playhouse, Connecticut
1954	The Starcross Story	cast	Royale Theatre, Broadway
1954	Mademoiselle Colombe	Edouard	Longacre Theatre, Broadway
1954	Sabrina Fair	the Frenchman	Scandaga Theatre, New York
1954	My Three Angels	Snake Man	Putnam Playhouse, Connecticut
1954	Affairs of State	cast	Theatre in the Round, New York City
1954	The Automobile Man	physicist	Bucks County Playhouse, Pennsylvania
1954	I Am a Camera	lead	Theatre in the Round, New York City
1954	Private Lives	Elyot	Theatre in the Round, New York City
1954	Voice of the Turtle	cast	Theatre in the Round, New York City
1955	The Grand Prize	John Condon Mitchell	Plymouth Theatre, Broadway
1955	The Heiress	Morris Townsend	Tent Theatre, Pennsylvania
1955	Mrs. Gibbon's Boys	Rodla	Bucks County Playhouse, Pennsylvania
1955	The Shoemaker's Children	cast	Bucks County Playhouse, Pennsylvania
1955	You Never Can Tell	Valentine	Olney Theatre Center, Maryland
1956	Fallen Angels	Frederick Starbuck	Playhouse Theatre, Broadway
1956	Double in Hearts	Asst. Stage Manager	John Golden Theatre, Broadway
1956	Candide	stagehand not a cast member	Martin Beck Theatre, Broadway
1957	Career	Sam Lawson	Seventh Avenue Playhouse, New York City
1957	The Anniversary Waltz	lead	Grant Lee Theatre
1957	Hotel Paradiso	cast	Henry Miller Theatre, Broadway
1957	The Greatest Man Alive	Hospital Aide	Ethel Barrymore Theatre, Broadway
1957	No Laughing Matter	Jean Louis	East Hampton, New York
1957	Of Time Remembered	understudy for Richard Burton	Morosco Theatre, Broadway
1958	Twelfth Night	Duke Orsino	New York Shakespeare Festival, Belevedere Lake Theatre, New York City
1958	The World of Suzie Wong	understudy, Robert Lomax	Broadhurst Theatre, Broadway
1959	USA	cast	Martinique Theatre, New York City
1960	Viva Madison Avenue!	Jim Leary	Longacre Theatre, Broadway
1960	Drums Under the Window	Adam and Cockney officer	Cherry Lane Theatre, New York City
1960	The Rules of the Game	Guido Venanzi	Gramercy Arts Theatre, New York City
1960–1962	USA	cast	UCLA Theatre Group
1961	Come Blow Your Horn	cast	Brooks Atkinson Theatre, Broadway
1961–1962	The Child Buyer	narrator	UCLA Theatre Group
1961–1962	Period of Adjustment	George Haverstick	UCLA Theatre Group
1969	The Bertolt Brecht Festival	cast	California
1970s–1990s	Thurber	one-man show	around the world
1970s–1990s	Thurber II	one-man show	around the world
1970s–1990s	Ernie Pyle	one-man show	around the United States
1970s–1990s	Ernie Pyle II	one-man show	around the United States
1997	On Golden Pond	Norman Thayer	Thousand Oaks Civic Arts Plaza, California
1999	Camping with Henry and Tom	Thomas Edison	Mt. Gretna Playhouse, Pennsylvania

== Awards and nominations ==
Year	Award	Category	Nominated work	Result
1970	Primetime Emmy Award	Outstanding Actor in a Comedy Series	My World and Welcome to It	Won
