= Masterpiece Playhouse =

American dramatic anthology television series

Masterpiece Playhouse is an American dramatic anthology series that aired in summer 1950 on NBC from 9 to 10 p.m. Eastern time on Sundays.

It consisted of seven live 60 minute adaptations of the plays Hedda Gabler (July 23, 1950), The Rivals (August 6, 1950), Richard III (July 30, 1950), Six Characters in Search of an Author (August 13, 1950), The Importance of Being Earnest (August 20, 1950), Uncle Vanya (September 3, 1950), and Othello (August 27, 1950). Its stars included Jessica Tandy, William Windom, Boris Karloff, Eva Gabor, Walter Abel, and Margaret Lindsay.

The producer was Curtis Canfield. Among its directors were William Corrigan and Delbert Mann, later Oscar winner for directing the film Marty.

== Bibliography ==
- Tim Brooks and Earle Marsh, The Complete Directory to Prime Time Network and Cable TV Shows 1946–Present, Ninth edition (New York: Ballantine Books, 2007) ISBN 978-0-345-49773-4
