= Key Witness (1960 film) =

1960 film by Phil Karlson

- Directed by: Phil Karlson
- Written by: Alfred Brenner; Sidney Michaels
- Based on: novel by Frank Kane
- Produced by: Pandro S. Berman
- Starring: Jeffrey Hunter; Patricia Crowley; Dennis Hopper
- Cinematography: Harold E. Wellman
- Edited by: Ferris Webster
- Music by: Charles Wolcott
- Production company: Avon Productions
- Distributed by: Metro-Goldwyn-Mayer
- Release date: October 6, 1960
- Running time: 82 minutes
- Country: United States
- Language: English
- Budget: $857,000
- Box office: $810,000

Key Witness is a black-and-white 1960 American neo-noir crime film directed by Phil Karlson and starring Jeffrey Hunter, Pat Crowley, and Dennis Hopper.

== Plot ==
Fred Morrow, an average Los Angeles citizen, witnesses a gang murder when he stops in a café to use a telephone. Aware that he is the only witness against them, the gang members, led by young motorcycle rider "Cowboy" Tomkins, seek out his identity and terrorize his family and him to keep him from testifying against them.

A police detective, Torno, fears he will lose his only witness, but Fred stands up to the gang, despite wife Ann's hysteria. Cowboy gives the Morrows until midnight to change their minds, while gang members Ruby, Muggles and Apple and he throw a rock through the family's window and slash their car's tires.

Cowboy leads the cops on a car chase, but is caught. In court, though, Fred changes his testimony after learning Ann has been attacked by Ruby, and their child is held at gunpoint by Muggles. He later provokes Apple, who is black, into siding against Cowboy, who reveals his racist attitudes toward his accomplice. Torno takes the entire gang into custody, with Apple agreeing to testify.

== Cast ==
- Jeffrey Hunter as Fred Morrow
- Pat Crowley as Ann Morrow
- Dennis Hopper as Cowboy Tomkins
- Joby Baker as Muggles
- Johnny Nash as Apple
- Susan Harrison as Ruby
- Frank Silvera as Det. Torno
- Terry Burnham as Gloria Morrow

== Production ==
It was one of two films Hunter made for Karlson, the other being Hell to Eternity.

The film featured the Charles Wolcott instrumental "Ruby Duby Du" as leitmotif. The Song hit the US Hot 100 and peaked at #41. The young femme fatale of the gang was named Ruby accordingly.

== Reception ==
According to MGM records, the film earned $360,000 in the US and Canada and $450,000 in other countries, resulting in a loss of $496,000. Reviews generally praised the film, although The Hollywood Reporter and Variety criticized its element of racism.

Writing in The New York Times, reviewer Howard Thompson praised the film, saying "If 'Key Witness' could be better, we don't know how." He also noted, "...this little picture is fast, tough, tight, sickeningly real to watch and wonderfully well put together."
