= Murder Can Hurt You =

1980 television film

- Genre: Comedy
- Written by: Ron Friedman
- Directed by: Roger Duchowny
- Starring: Tony Danza; Burt Young; Jamie Farr; John Byner; Gavin MacLeod; Victor Buono; Jimmie Walker; Buck Owens; Connie Stevens
- Music by: Artie Kane
- Country of origin: United States
- Original language: English

Production
- Executive producers: Douglas S. Cramer; Aaron Spelling
- Producers: Shelley Hull; Robert L. Jacks; E. Duke Vincent
- Cinematography: Archie R. Dalzell
- Editor: John F. Schreyer
- Running time: 100 min.
- Production company: Aaron Spelling Productions

Original release
- Network: ABC
- Release: May 21, 1980

Murder Can Hurt You (stylized onscreen as Murder Can Hurt You!) is a 1980 American made-for-television comedy film that parodies detective and police TV shows of the 1960s and 1970s, much as Murder by Death spoofed literary detectives. The film was directed by Roger Duchowny.

== Plot ==
A mysterious "Man in White" is out to kill detectives in bizarre ways, and the characters are parodies of Kojak, Baretta, Starsky and Hutch, Ironside, Police Woman, Columbo, Mrs. Columbo, and McCloud.

The movie starts with the Man In White killing Lambretta, after which Lt. Nojack calls a meeting of the detectives in the city. During this meeting the man in white threatens to kill them all, locks them in their meeting room, and sets a bomb to kill them all while he makes his escape.

The Aaron Spelling Productions logo at the end pays homage to Mark VII Limited, using a hammer and stamp.

== Cast ==
Actor	Character	Sends up:
Don Adams (voice only)	Narrator	--
Marty Allen	Detective Starkos	Detective Stavros
Mel Blanc (voice only)	Chickie Baby	--
Victor Buono	Ironbottom	former Chief of Detectives; Robert Ironside
John Byner	Hatch	Kenneth "Hutch" Hutchinson
Tony Danza	Pony Lambretta	Tony Baretta
Jamie Farr	Studsky	David Starsky
Mitchell Kreindel	The Man in White	--
Gavin MacLeod	Nojack	Lieutenant Theo Kojak
Buck Owens	MacSkye	Marshal Samuel McCloud
Connie Stevens	Salty Sanderson	Sergeant Suzanne "Pepper" Anderson
Liz Torres	Mrs. Palumbo	Mrs. Columbo
Jimmie Walker	Parks the Pusher	Mark Sanger
Burt Young	Lieutenant Palumbo	Lieutenant Columbo
