= Big Daddy (1969 film) =

- Film poster
- Directed by: Carl K. Hittleman
- Written by: Carl K. Hittleman
- Produced by: Carl K. Hittleman
- Cinematography: Morrison B. Paul
- Edited by: Carlo Lodato; Margaret Royce
- Music by: Alan Hyams
- Production company: Szygzy Productions
- Distributed by: United Film Organization
- Release date: June 11, 1969 (El Paso, Texas)
- Running time: 68 minutes
- Country: United States
- Language: English

Big Daddy is a horror film directed, produced and written by Carl K. Hittleman. It was filmed in 1965 under the title Paradise Road, but not released until 1969.

== Plot ==
A man (Reed Sherman) visiting the Florida Everglades falls for an illiterate girl, and competes with the mysterious A. Lincoln Beauregard (Victor Buono) for her affections. He also encounters vicious alligators and a voodoo witch doctor.

== Cast ==
- Victor Buono as A. Lincoln Beauregard
- Joan Blondell
- Chill Wills
- Tisha Sterling
- Reed Sherman
- William Benedict
- John Hale
- Virginia Sale
- Tanya Lemani
- Ned Romero
- Kelton Garwood
- Louis Hart
- Hank Worden
- Arline Hunter

== See also ==
- List of American films of 1969
