= Hawaii Five-O (1968 TV series) season 4 =

Hawaii Five-O
- Season 4
- DVD cover
- No. of episodes: 24

Release
- Original network: CBS
- Original release: September 14, 1971 – March 7, 1972

Season chronology
- ← Previous; Season 3 Next → Season 5

The fourth season of Hawaii Five-O, an American television series, began September 14, 1971, and ended on March 7, 1972. It aired on CBS. The region 1 DVD was released on June 10, 2008.

This season marks the final series appearance of Zulu.

== Episodes ==
No. overall	No. in season	Title	Directed by	Written by	Original release date	Prod. code
74	1	"Highest Castle, Deepest Grave"	Charles S. Dubin	S : Elick Moll & Joseph Than; T : Jerome Coopersmith	September 14, 1971	1729-0361
A ten-year-old missing-persons case is reopened when an archaeological dig reveals the bodies of a man and a woman who were murdered. Herbert Lom, France Nuyen (who plays both the victim and killer) and Jeff Corey guest star. NOTE: Herman Wedemeyer appears in this episode as the judge.
75	2	"No Bottles… No Cans… No People"	Michael O'Herlihy	Jerry Ludwig & Eric Bercovici	September 21, 1971	1729-0355
An ambitious hoodlum (Henry Darrow) tries to eliminate the competition and open the way for a mainland crime syndicate to operate in Hawaii. Beth Brickwell and Ron Feinberg guests stars. NOTES: Before becoming a series regular in season 5, Al Harrington plays one of the hoodlum's henchmen in this episode.
76	3	"Wednesday, Ladies Free"	Michael O' Herlihy	T : Jerome Coopersmith; S/T : Paul Playdon	September 28, 1971	1729-0359
A strangler murders women and leaves each wearing a blonde wig and their faces garishly made up. Soon Tek-Oh and Monte Markham guest star.
77	4	"3,000 Crooked Miles to Honolulu"	Jerry Thorpe	Jerome Coopersmith	October 5, 1971	1729-0356
A brilliant but criminal college professor (Buddy Ebsen) runs an elaborate scheme to cash $750,000 worth of stolen travelers checks in Hawaii, but his plan is hindered by two foolish hit-men. David Canary also guest stars. At the end McGarret proclaims to the 747 planeload of the professor and his accomplices that their next destination is not the mainland but 15 years in prison with the concluding remark "Aloha Suckers".
78	5	"Two Doves and Mr. Heron"	Charles S. Dubin	Anthony Lawrence	October 12, 1971	1729-0354
A tourist (Vic Morrow) declines to press charges after being robbed of his wallet by a hippie buffoon (John Ritter) after mistaking the tourist as a homosexual. Inside the wallet is a key to a storage locker containing $250,000, which the tourist embezzled from the mainland.
79	6	"…And I Want Some Candy and a Gun That Shoots"	Michael O'Herlihy	John D. F. Black	October 19, 1971	1729-0358
A psychotic sniper (Michael Burns) endangers the lives of motorists as he fires at cars from a hillside bunker on Diamond Head that overlooks a major highway. Annette O'Toole guest stars. NOTE: Herman Wedemeyer appears in this episode as HPD officer Duke Kanaha.
80	7	"Air Cargo… Dial for Murder"	Michael O'Herlihy	Meyer Dolinsky	October 26, 1971	1729-0363
McGarrett discovers an air cargo hijacking ring while investigating the death of an airport security officer working undercover as a freight handler. Michael Strong, Marion Ross and James Hong guest star.
81	8	"For a Million… Why Not?"	Ron Winston	S : Eric Bercovici & Jerry Ludwig; T : Jerome Coopersmith	November 2, 1971	1729-0366
Five upstanding citizens team together and commit four murders to steal $6 million from an armored car in a seemingly perfect crime. Glenn Cannon, Al Harrington, Sam Melville and Jack Kruschen guest star. NOTE: Date given in episode is August 23, 1971.
82	9	"The Burning Ice"	Paul Stanley	Ken Pettus	November 9, 1971	1729-0351
A doctor becomes a suspect in the murder of his wife when McGarrett does not believe the dying killer's confession. Jackie Cooper and Lou Antonio guest star.
83	10	"Rest in Peace, Somebody"	Paul Stanley	John D.F. Black	November 16, 1971	1729-0353
McGarrett receives calls from a man (Norm Alden) threatening to kill someone in 51 hours and the only clue as to the identity of the victim is a key; two false clues and a paint trail.
84	11	"A Matter of Mutual Concern"	Ron Winston	Alvin Sapinsley	November 23, 1971	1729-0368
When an emissary of "Big Uncle," the mainland syndicate's boss of bosses, is murdered, McGarrett fears a gangland war is about to break out among the four crime bosses in Hawaii. David Opatoshu and Manu Tupou guest star.
85	12	"Nine, Ten, You're Dead"	Leo Penn	Mel Goldberg	November 30, 1971	1729-0352
A syndicate boss (Albert Paulsen) seeks revenge when his light-heavyweight boxer's hand is smashed by a punchy ex-fighter (Moses Gunn).
86	13	"Is This Any Way to Run a Paradise?"	Michael O'Herilhy	Bill Stratton	December 21, 1971	1729-0357
McGarrett searches for an ecology fanatic whose pranks are harmless until he threatens the lives of those he feels are the cause of the islands' pollution.
87	14	"Odd Man in"	Paul Stanley	E. Arthur Kean	December 28, 1971	1729-0360
Lewis Avery Filer (Hume Cronyn), last encountered in "Over Fifty? Steal" (season 3, episode 11), escapes from prison after devising a plan to steal $4 million from drug smugglers. McGarrett's only clues are a stolen photograph and an I.O.U. for $2,200 in stolen money.
88	15	"Bait Once, Bait Twice"	Alf Kjellin	S : Jerome Ross; T : Will Lorin	January 4, 1972	1729-0371
A young woman is blackmailed into attempting suicide so that her fiance will come out of hiding and expose himself to assassination. Loretta Swit, Malachi Throne and James Olson guest star. First appearance of Glenn Cannon as District Attorney John Manicote.
89	16	"The Ninety-Second War"	Bob Sweeney	S : Leonard Freeman; T : John D.F. Black	January 11, 1972	1729-0367
90	17	"The Ninety-Second War"	Bob Sweeney	S : Leonard Freeman; T : John D.F. Black	January 18, 1972	1729-0367
Part 1: McGarrett is framed as a thief by Wo Fat, whose devious plot involves a notebook filled with secret codes--written in McGarrett's handwriting, of all things. Note this episode has a scene of Danny Williams talking through a broken car window to the injured Steve McGarrett (in the next season this scene replaced the opening teaser of Williams from Season 1). Dana Wynter guest stars. Jack Lord stars as Steve McGarrett and his imposter (who speaks with a dubbed British accent). Donald Pleasence guest stars. Part 2: Wo Fat's plan revolves around a missile test--and ninety crucial seconds. Guest stars Roger C. Carmel as Misha the Bear ("F.O.B. Honolulu", season 3, episodes 18 and 19); Tim O'Connor as Jonathan Kaye. As the legal owner of Wo Fat's 2.2 million, McGarrett donates it to the HPD Widow's Orphans and survivors Fund.: NOTES: Herman Wedemeyer appears in this episode as HPD officer Ishi. Despite being credited, Zulu does not appear in this episode.
91	18	"Skinhead"	Allen Reisner	S : Will Lorin; T : Alvin Sapinsley	January 25, 1972	1729-0372
After a young woman is raped in a parking lot and a braggart soldier is arrested and tried for the crime, McGarrett begins to suspect the soldier may be the wrong man.
92	19	"While You're at It, Bring in the Moon"	Michael O'Herlihy	E. Arthur Kean	February 1, 1972	1729-0370
A germophobic, eccentric billionaire (loosely based on Howard Hughes), suspected of killing one of his business associates, but who in turn suspects another, is afraid to leave his antiseptic yacht and clear himself of the crime--and he is forced to abduct McGarrett to help him. McGarrett must uncover the real killer from the remaining three living associates. Barry Sullivan, Milton Selzer, Ed Flanders guest star. NOTE: Herman Wedemeyer now cast as HPD officer Duke (no last name). In episode 4, he was cast as Duke Kanaha.
93	20	"Cloth of Gold"	Michael O'Herlihy	Bennett Foster	February 8, 1972	1729-0365
Three Conmen members of a fishy real estate company become victims of poison contained in a rare shellfish.Al Eben as "Doc"; Jason Evers and Jay Robinson guest star. The teaser of the killer scuba diving is a stock shot. Date of a death letter for one of victims is September 10, 1971.
94	21	"Good Night, Baby--Time to Die!"	Alf Kjellin	Abram S. Ginnes	February 15, 1972	1729-0373
McGarrett sets up an elaborate police protective system using a large amount of HPD manpower around a young woman to capture her former boyfriend, a lifer, who has escaped from prison but all is not as it seems. William C. Watson and Beth Brickell guest star. NOTE: Zulu (credited) does not appear in this episode.
95	22	"Didn't We Meet at a Murder?"	Paul Stanley	Jerome Coopersmith	February 22, 1972	1729-0364
A wealthy young widow is one of three victims (who become killers) in an intricate blackmail plot that leads to the murder of a Chicago mobster (Simon Oakland). When the only break in the case occurs, Danny fails to handcuff the arrested suspect which leads to the suspect's death. Loosely based on Sherlock Holmes' story The Red-Headed League.
96	23	"Follow the White Brick Road"	Michael O'Herihly	John Furia	February 29, 1972	1729-0369
In cooperation with NIS, Danny goes undercover to flush out a drug ring operating from a vessel in the U.S. Seventh Fleet. David Doyle guest stars.
97	24	"R & R & R"	Leo Penn	Bill Stratton	March 7, 1972	1729-0362
McGarrett must stop an embittered, emotionally unstable ex-GI killer (who, because of a Section 8 discharge, cannot reenlist in the U.S. military), whose targets have been wives of Army officers who have come to Hawaii to meet their husbands on furlough. Alan Vint guest stars.
