= Kelton Garwood =

American actor (1928–1991)

Kelton B. Garwood
- Garwood in The Twilight Zone, 1961
- Born: Kelton Bradford Garwood; May 21, 1928; Columbus, Ohio, U.S.
- Died: July 28, 1991 (aged 63); Chatsworth, California, U.S.
- Education: American Theatre Wing
- Occupation: Actor
- Years active: 1952–1988
- Organization: Screen Actors Guild
- Children: 2, including Doug Garwood

Kelton Bradford Garwood, also known and credited as Jonathan Harper, and John Harper, (May 21, 1928 – July 28, 1991) was an American actor on stage, film and television. He was best known as undertaker Percy Crump on the western television show Gunsmoke.

== Early life ==
Kelton Bradford Garwood was born in Columbus, Ohio, the middle of three sons for William E. Garwood, a bank teller, and Marquise V. Trott. He was still in high school when he registered for the draft on his eighteenth birthday in 1946. The draft registrar recorded him as being 6 ft 3 in (191 cm), 160 pounds (73 kg), with blue eyes and blonde hair.

== Military service and college ==
Following high school, Garwood enlisted in the United States Marine Corps, where by July 1947 he was a private assigned to photographic reconnaissance squadron VMP-354 at Marine Corps Air Station Cherry Point, North Carolina.

Upon his discharge, Garwood enrolled at The Ohio State University, majoring in drama. He graduated in Spring 1952, by which time he had already acquired some professional stage experience.

== Early stage career ==
After college Garwood joined the Pine Tree Players in Laurel, Maryland for the 1952 summer stock season. He performed in one week runs of My Sister Eileen, Light Up the Sky, All My Sons, and Guest in the House. He was granted a room and board scholarship to the Oregon Shakespeare Festival for the Summer of 1952.

From Fall 1952 through Spring 1953 he was in New York City, taking advanced seminars from the American Theatre Wing. He specialized in theatrical fencing, studying with Eddie Lucia, an Olympic Coach. While in New York, he also did some television work, though details of this are not known. Garwood put his specialty to work in a season of summer stock during 1953 in Yellow Springs, Ohio, where he both performed Shakespeare with the Antioch Area Theater and served as their fencing master. He performed with Robert Preston and Jack Klugman in a production of Detective Story at York, Pennsylvania during October 1953. He then moved south to Baltimore where he spent the winter season with a troupe of players at the Hilltop Theatre-Parkway, performing in Stalag 17, Mister Roberts, Kiss and Tell with Margaret O'Brien, Ramshackle Inn with ZaSu Pitts, and several other plays.

Garwood returned to the Antioch Area Theater for the 1954 summer season, again serving in a dual capacity as actor and fencing master. He also performed with the Antioch players in a winter production of The Tempest at Cincinnati Music Hall, accompanied by the Cincinnati Symphony Orchestra in the American debut of incidental music for the play, composed by Jean Sibelius in 1925.

== Further stage career ==
His first starring stage role and longest-running stage performance was as Osceola in Florida Aflame from January thru April 1955. Garwood had auditioned for the part in New York City, for this outdoor production in a new amphitheater built in Philippe Park at Safety Harbor, Florida. This was not a pageant, but an actual drama by John Caldwell in which Garwood portrayed the tragic hero.

Garwood performed again with the Antioch Area Theatre's annual Shakespeare festival during the Summer of 1955. A guest director at the festival, Jack Landau, cast Garwood for his Fall production of The Carefree Tree. This play by Aldyth Morris opened at the Phoenix Theatre in New York City on October 11, 1955; Farley Granger and Janice Rule starred, with Edith Meiser, Blanche Yurka, Alvin Ailey and Jerry Stiller in supporting roles. Garwood had a small feature part in this two-act play based on an ancient Chinese legend, his first Broadway performance. The writing was panned by critics, and the show closed November 6, 1955.

From February thru April 1956 Garwood again performed in an outdoor drama, this time at the Suncoast Amphitheatre in Ruskin, Florida. Voice in the Wind by Kermit Hunter concerned events during the first two Seminole Wars; Garwood had a supporting role as the villain. He then returned to the Antioch Area Theatre for its Shakespeare festival from late June through early September 1956, and again the following summer of 1957.

Garwood's second Broadway performance came during January 1958, when The Chairs by Eugène Ionesco, staged by Tony Richardson, had its American debut at the Phoenix Theatre. It was part of a double-bill that included another one-act play by Ionecso, The Lesson; both were performed for a limited engagement of two weeks. Garwood played The Orator; his co-stars were Joan Plowright (The Old Woman) and Eli Wallach (The Old Man). Brooks Atkinson of The New York Times said "these odd, elliptical fantastifications are amusing and provocative", while columnist Joan Hanauer felt they were "for people who like to be bothered and bewildered".

== Screen career ==
After doing Ionesco on Broadway, Garwood relocated to Los Angeles. Director Blake Edwards was so impressed that he arranged for Garwood to begin a film career, with a supporting role of Magician in the 1959 episode "Murder on the Midway" of the television series Peter Gunn. Afterwards, he became a notable supporting character actor in over 45 features, often portraying husbands, fathers, eccentrics, aristocrats, cowboys, sheriffs, policemen, reporters, detectives, clerks, and in his later years, patriarchs.

His film career including roles in The Miracle of the Hills (1959), The Story of Ruth (1960), The Wizard of Baghdad (1961), Move Over, Darling (1963), The Sandpiper (1965), A Covenant with Death (1967), Big Daddy (1969), and Return to Snowy River (1988).

On television, he was a familiar face in the guest cast of Bachelor Father, The Big Valley, Captain Nice, The Danny Kaye Show, Destry, I Dream of Jeannie, Empire, Get Smart, The Girl from U.N.C.L.E., Have Gun – Will Travel, Hondo, Hotel de Paree, Iron Horse, Laredo, The Magical World of Disney, The Man from U.N.C.L.E., The Many Loves of Dobie Gillis, Mister Ed, The Monkees, The Munsters, Overland Trail, Rawhide, The Rebel, The Red Skelton Hour, The Rifleman, Ripcord, Sea Hunt, Tales of Wells Fargo, Tate, Two Faces West, The Untouchables, Wagon Train, The Waltons and of course twelve appearances on Gunsmoke, nine of which are as Undertaker Percy Crump. In The Twilight Zone, he guest-starred as the hobo in the episode "Five Characters in Search of an Exit". He also played the recurring role of the character Beauregard O'Hanlon in Bourbon Street Beat.

On stage, his appearances include the play A Touch of the Poet (1963).

== Personal life ==
From 1958 until his death, Garwood was married to interior designer Janet Garwood and the couple had two sons, one of whom became professional golfer Doug Garwood.

== Filmography ==
A partial filmography follows.

=== Film ===
- The Miracle of the Hills (1959)
- The Story of Ruth (1960)
- The Wizard of Baghdad (1961)
- Move Over, Darling (1963)
- The Sandpiper (1965)
- A Covenant with Death (1967)
- Big Daddy (1969)
- Menace on the Mountain (1970)
- Return to Snowy River (1988)

=== Television ===
Year	Title	Role	Notes
1959	Peter Gunn	Magician	"Murder on the Midway"
1959-1960	Bourbon Street Beat.	Beauregard O'Hanlon	5 episodes
1961	The Twilight Zone	The Tramp	"Five Characters in Search of an Exit"
1961	Gunsmoke	Sam Jones	"Colorado Sheriff"
1962	Gunsmoke	Fred	"The Hunger"
1965	Gunsmoke	Vain (uncredited)	"Seven Hours to Dawn"
1966-1972	Gunsmoke	Percy Crump	9 episodes
