= Target: Harry =

- Directed by: Henry Neill
- Written by: Bob Barbash
- Produced by: Gene Corman
- Starring: Vic Morrow; Suzanne Pleshette; Michael Ansara; Victor Buono; Cesar Romero; Charlotte Rampling
- Cinematography: Patrice Pouget
- Edited by: Monte Hellman
- Music by: Les Baxter
- Production company: The Corman Company
- Distributed by: ABC Pictures International
- Release dates: January 1969; January 1979 (UK)
- Running time: 85 minutes
- Country: United States
- Language: English
- Box office: 46,446 admissions (France)

Target: Harry (also known as How to Make It and the original title What's in it for Harry?) is a 1969 thriller film directed by Roger Corman.

The film was originally meant as a television pilot for the American Broadcasting Company. Rather than show it as a made-for-television film, the film was released theatrically as How to Make It. The film was shot in Monaco and Turkey in 1967 with Monte Hellman editing the film in 1968.

Roger Corman took his name off the film and credited himself as "Henry Neill". According to Flimink the reasons for this are "a bit hazy – maybe because Gene added extra footage to try to sell the film, meant for television, to cinemas."

== Plot ==
During a race at Monte Carlo, Milos Segora attempts to assassinate Jason Carlyle but shoots an innocent bystander instead. Carlyle and his daughter Ruth flee the scene. Meanwhile, freelance pilot Harry Black is bailed out of prison and released with a warning by Lieutenant Duval. Harry flies Jason Carlyle to Istanbul. Shortly thereafter, Carlyle is murdered.

Carlyle was believed to be carrying plates for counterfeiting currency, plates that are now missing. Harry is caught between rival crooks searching for the plates, and also the Istanbul police, who suspect his involvement in Carlyle's death. Interested parties include purported local crimelord Mosul Rashi, whose henchmen include Segora and Kemal; and the mysterious Diane Reed. After various run-ins, Harry flees Istanbul and returns to Monte Carlo.

In Monte Carlo, Harry meets with Ruth and discovers that she had plates all along. Kemal, in league with Diane, breaks into Ruth's hotel room, murders her, and takes the plates. Kemal subsequently attempts to kill Harry but Harry kills him instead. Harry and Rashi form an alliance of convenience and follow Diane to Kerkyra. There, Segora reveals himself to be a member of the Albanian secret service and makes his own deal with Diane for the plates. In the ensuing chase, Harry and Rashi try to escape by hiding in tour group. Segora and his men shoot several tourists before Harry and Rashi shoot them. Rashi bows out of the caper, and Harry returns to Monte Carlo alone to confront Diane. He agrees to team up with Diane but instead turns her in to Duval.

== Cast ==
- Vic Morrow as Harry Black
- Suzanne Pleshette as Diane Reed
- Victor Buono as Mosul Rashi
- Cesar Romero as Lieutenant Duval
- Stanley Holloway as Jason Carlyle
- Charlotte Rampling as Ruth Carlyle
- Michael Ansara as Major Milos Segora
- Kathy Fraisse as Lisa Boulez
- Christian Barbier as Sulley Boulez
- Fikret Hakan as Insp. Devrim
- Milton Reid as Kemal
- Anna Capri as Francesca
- Laurie Main as Simon Sscott
- Victoria Hale as Michele
- Jack Leonard as Valdez

== Production ==
In August 1967, it was announced that Gene Corman would produce What's in It for Harry? on the French Riviera, a "comedy-drama" for ABC from a script by Bob Barbush and directed by Roger Corman. A few weeks later it was announced Vic Morrow would play the star role, and that it would be ABC's initial foray into theatrical motion pictures. Locations would be in Monte Carlo, Greece and Istanbul. Roger Corman later said it was made for TV and called it "a movie of the week before there was such a thing."

Filming began mid September 1967.

Alain Corneau worked as an assistant director.

== Reception ==
Gene Corman reportedly added some nude scenes to help sell the movie under the title of How to Make It. The film was released in England in 1980 as Target: Harry.

== See also ==
- List of American films of 1969
