= Frank Kane (author) =

American writer

- Born: July 19, 1912; Brooklyn, New York City
- Died: November 29, 1968 (aged 56); Manhasset, New York
- Occupation: Writer (novelist)
- Writing career
- Pen name: Frank Boyd
- Period: 20th century
- Genre: Fiction

Frank Kane (July 19, 1912 – November 29, 1968) was an American author of detective fiction.

== Biography ==
Kane was brought up in Brooklyn, New York. He attended St. John's Law School but had to leave his studies to support his spouse and newborn child. He graduated from City College of New York. He worked as a columnist for The New York Press, as a letterer for the New York Trade Newspapers Corporation, for the New York Journal of Commerce, and in public relations, particularly as an advocate for the liquor industry. After World War II, he was a freelance writer, later working in radio, where he introduced movie stars, and in television.

Kane wrote for productions of The Shadow, Gang Busters, Counter Spy, The Fat Man, Casey, Crime Photographer, Mr. Keen, Tracer of Lost Persons, The Lawless Twenties, Nick Carter, Master Detective, and for the Coast Guard documentary You Have To Go Out. He created Call the Police for Lever Brothers and Claim Agent for NBC. From the 1940s through the 1960s, he wrote close to 40 novels (mostly centered around the character Johnny Liddell). He also wrote numerous short stories for crime magazines such as Manhunt, The Saint Detective Magazine, Private Eye, and Pursuit. His paperback novels about Liddell were reported to have sold more than 30 million copies and to have been translated into 17 languages.

He spent much of his in Hollywood, writing television dramas for the shows Special Agent 7 and The Investigators. He also wrote at least two dozen episodes of the television series Mike Hammer.

In 1960, his novel Key Witness was made into a feature film.

== Personal life and death ==
Kane and his wife, Ann, had three daughters. He died of a heart attack on November 29, 1968, in his home in Manhasset, Long Island, aged 56.

== Works ==
Credits	Title	Year	Comment
Frank Kane	About Face	1947	
Frank Kane	Death About Face	-	reprint of About Face
Frank Kane	The Fatal Foursome	-	reprint of About Face
Frank Kane	Green Light For Death	1949	
Frank Kane	Slay Ride	1950	
Frank Kane	Bullet Proof	1951	
Frank Kane	Dead Weight	1951	
Frank Kane	Bare Trap	1952	
Frank Kane	Poisons Unknown	1953	
Frank Kane	Grave Danger	1954	
Frank Kane	Red Hot Ice	1955	
Frank Kane	Johnny Liddell's Morgue	1956	
Frank Kane	Key Witness	1956	
Frank Kane	A Real Gone Guy	1956	
Frank Kane	Juke Box King	1957	
Frank Kane	The Living End	1957	
Frank Kane	Liz	1958	
Frank Kane	Syndicate Girl	1958	
Frank Kane	Trigger Mortis	1958	
Frank Kane	The Line-Up	1959	
Frank Kane	Trial By Fear	1959	
Frank Boyd	The Flesh Peddlers	1959	
Frank Kane	A Short Bier	1960	
Frank Kane	Time To Prey	1960	
Frank Boyd	Johnny Staccato	1960	based on the television series of the same name
Frank Kane	Due Or Die	1961	
Frank Kane	The Mourning After	1961	
Frank Kane	Stacked Deck	1961	
Frank Kane	The Conspirators	1962	
Frank Kane	Crime Of Their Live	1962	
Frank Kane	Dead Rite	1962	
Frank Kane	Hearse Class Male	1963	
Frank Kane	Johnny Come Lately	1963	
Frank Kane	Ring-A-Ding-Ding	1963	
Frank Kane	Barely Seen	1964	
Frank Kane	Fatal Undertaking	1964	
Frank Kane	Final Curtain	1964	
Frank Kane	The Guilt-Edged Frame	1964	
Frank Kane	Esprit De Corpse	1965	
Frank Kane	Two To Tangle	1965	
Frank Kane	Maid In Paris	1966	
Frank Kane	Margin For Terror	1967	
