= Susan Harrison =

American actress (1938–2019)

- Harrison in The Twilight Zone, 1961
- Born: August 26, 1938; Leesburg, Florida, U.S.
- Died: March 5, 2019 (aged 80); Los Angeles, California, U.S.
- Education: Boston University
- Occupation: Actress
- Years active: 1956–1963
- Spouses: Joel Colin (died 1976); Cassius Conger (died 1999)
- Children: 3, including Darva Conger

Susan Stewart Harrison (August 26, 1938 – March 5, 2019) was an American actress, most famous for her appearance in the 1957 film noir classic Sweet Smell of Success as the sister for whom Burt Lancaster has an unhealthy affection, and in The Twilight Zone episode "Five Characters in Search of an Exit".

== Early life ==
Harrison was a graduate of the High School of Performing Arts in New York City. She attended Boston University, studying under Peter Kass, who directed her in the role of Abigail in Arthur Miller's The Crucible.

== Career ==
Her professional debut was in the live television drama Can You Coffeepot on Skates?, presented in 1956. This was followed by television appearances on Matinee Theatre and Alfred Hitchcock Presents and her cinematic debut in Sweet Smell of Success opposite Burt Lancaster and Tony Curtis. Harrison said in 2011 that Kass had introduced her to writer Clifford Odets which she believed factored into her casting as well as well ans all her training and added of shooting: "Everyone was always there. There were constant, daily around-the-table discussions, revisions, changes. Everyone was welcome to their input. It was the most democratic... and even I was invited and even asked what I thought... it was a good way to work. I'd never seen it done that way."

On October 19, 1957, she opened on Broadway at the Bijou Theater, playing "the Girl" in William Saroyan's new play The Cave Dwellers to uniformly good reviews. The following year she was in the Playhouse 90 production of In Lonely Expectation, which brought her to the attention of Rod Serling and led to her role as the ballerina in the iconic Twilight Zone episode. She had several later television and stage roles, most notably in an episode of the television show Bonanza, "Dark Star" in the first season, episode 31 (1960). In 1960 she played Ruby, the female lead, in the little-seen film Key Witness with Jeffrey Hunter and Dennis Hopper.

== Personal life ==
She was the mother of Darva Conger, who starred in the reality television show Who Wants to Marry a Multi-Millionaire? Harrison had two other children, D. H. Colin and Daniel Colin. She died in a nursing facility in North Hills, California, on March 5, 2019 at the age of 80.

== Filmography ==
=== Film ===
Year	Title	Role	Notes
1957	Sweet Smell of Success	Susan Hunsecker	
1960	Key Witness	Ruby	

=== Television ===
Year	Title	Role	Notes
1956	Star Tonight	Dorsey Mitchell	Season 2 Episode 36: Can you Coffeepot on Skates?
1956	Matinee Theater		Episode 156: Fight the Whole World
1959	Playhouse 90	P.J.	Season 3 Episode 26: In Lonely Expectation by Mayo Simon
1960	Bonanza	Tirza	Season 1 Episode 31: Dark Star
1961	The Light That Failed	Maisie	TV film based on the novel by Rudyard Kipling
1961	The Twilight Zone	The Ballerina	Season 3 Episode 14: Five Characters in Search of an Exit
1961	Follow the Sun	Linda Tait	Season 1 Episode 9: The Hunters
1961	Alfred Hitchcock Presents	Susan Harper	Season 6 Episode 31: "The Gloating Place"
1963	Breaking Point	Martha	Season 1 Episode 12: Millions of Faces
