= Victor Buono =

American actor and comic (1938–1982)

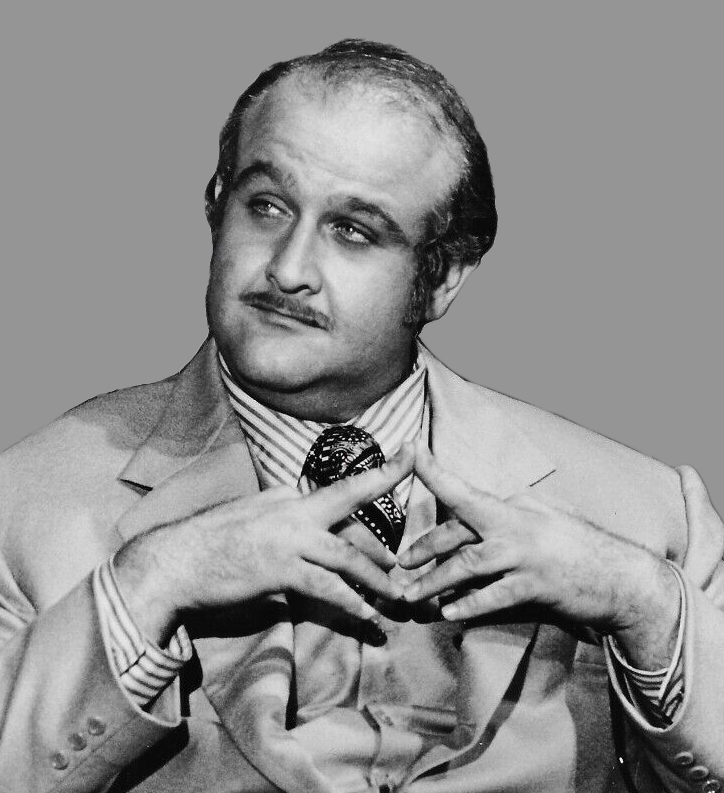
- Buono in 1972
- Born: Victor Charles Buono; February 3, 1938; San Diego, California, U.S.
- Died: January 1, 1982 (aged 43); Apple Valley, California, U.S.
- Occupations: Actor; comic; recording artist
- Years active: 1956–1981

Victor Charles Buono (February 3, 1938 – January 1, 1982) was an American actor, comic, and briefly a recording artist. He was known for playing the villain King Tut in the television series Batman (1966–1968) and musician Edwin Flagg in What Ever Happened to Baby Jane? (1962), the latter of which earned him Academy Award and Golden Globe Award nominations. He was a busy actor from his late teens until his death at the age of 43 and, with his large size and sonorous voice, he made a career of playing men much older than he actually was.

== Early life and career ==
Buono was the son of Victor F. Buono, a former police officer and bail bondsman who was sentenced to life imprisonment after being found guilty of first-degree murder and conspiracy to commit robbery in 1959. Released on parole after seven years but forced to serve a further sentence due to a previous conviction for bird smuggling, Victor Sr. continued to manage the affairs of his son while in prison.

Buono started appearing on local radio and television stations, and at age 18 joined the Globe Theater Players in San Diego. The director had confidence in Buono and cast him in Volpone, A Midsummer Night's Dream and other Globe presentations. He received good notices for his various Shakespearean roles and in modern plays such as The Man Who Came to Dinner and Witness for the Prosecution.

In the summer of 1959, a talent scout from Warner Bros. saw the heavy-set Buono play Falstaff at the Globe and took him to Hollywood for a screen test. Buono made his first network TV appearance playing the bearded poet Bongo Benny in an episode of 77 Sunset Strip. Over the next few years, he played menacing heavies in series on TV and appeared on The Untouchables. After appearing in a few uncredited film roles, he was cast by director Robert Aldrich in the psychological horror film What Ever Happened to Baby Jane? (1962). The film starred Bette Davis and Joan Crawford and Buono played the hapless musical accompanist Edwin Flagg, a performance for which he was nominated for the Academy Award for Best Supporting Actor and the Golden Globe Award for Best Supporting Actor – Motion Picture.

=== Noteworthy film roles ===
Shortly after What Ever Happened to Baby Jane?, Buono appeared in Hush...Hush, Sweet Charlotte (1964) as Big Sam Hollis, the father of Bette Davis, who played the title role. The film was also directed by Aldrich. In the Biblical epic The Greatest Story Ever Told (1965), Buono portrayed the High Priest Sorak, and in The Strangler, a film based on the actual Boston Strangler Murders of the time, he portrayed Leo Kroll.

He also appeared in 4 for Texas (1963), Robin and the 7 Hoods (1964), The Silencers (1966), Who's Minding the Mint? (1967), Target: Harry (1969), Beneath the Planet of the Apes (1970), The Mad Butcher (1972) and The Evil (1978) as the Devil himself, clad in a white suit.

=== Television roles ===
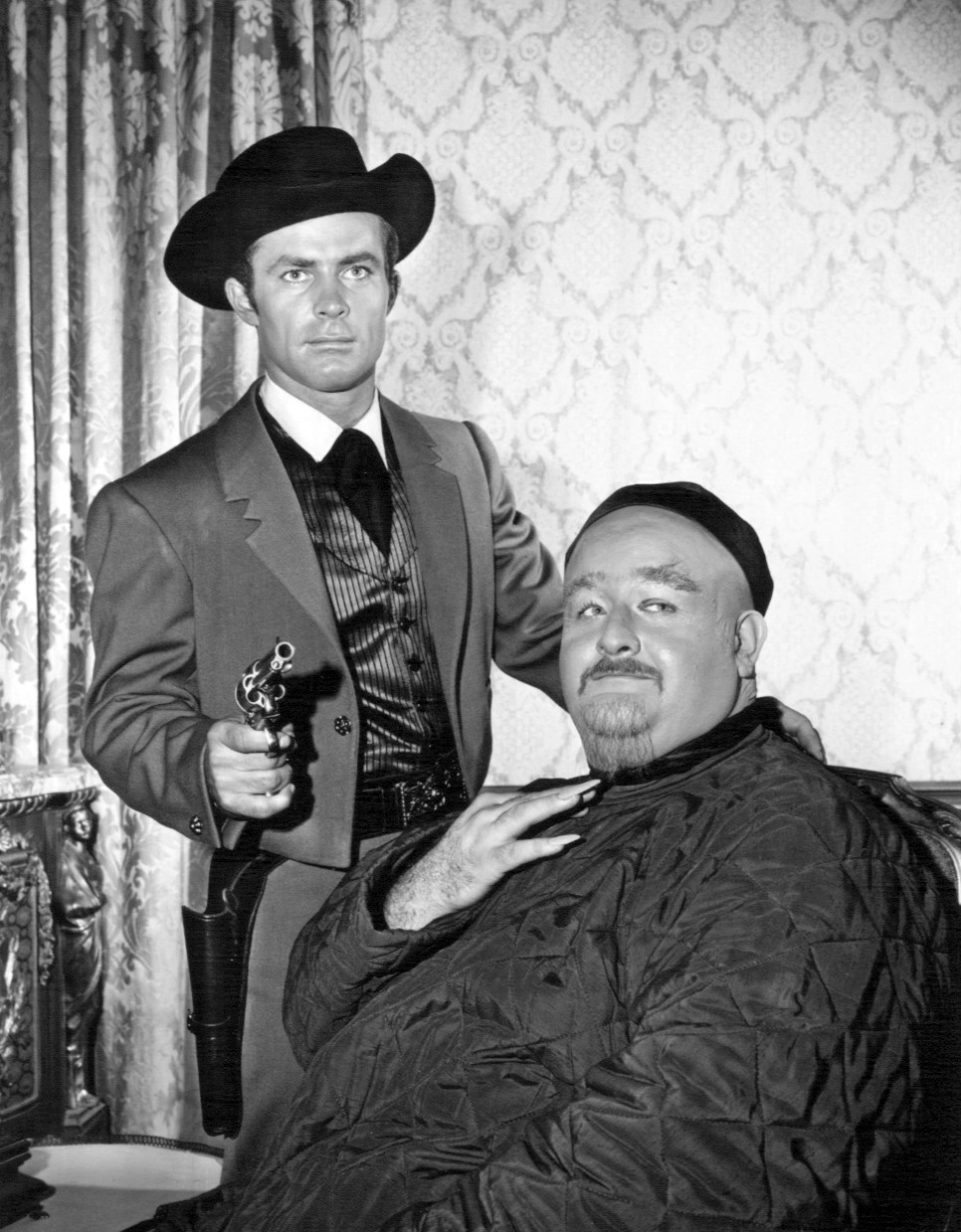
Robert Conrad as special agent Jim West and Victor Buono guest-starring as a character disguised as a Chinese merchant from the premiere of the television series The Wild Wild West.

Buono also had many television roles. He played the recurring role of Count Manzeppi in The Wild Wild West and also played unrelated characters in that series' premiere episode and in the second and final Wild Wild West reunion film More Wild Wild West (1980).

Buono was cast to play villains of various ethnic origins on many television programs between 1960 and 1970. He was cast twice in 1960 in the western series The Rebel, starring Nick Adams, in the episodes "Blind Marriage" and "The Earl of Durango". In 1962, he played Melanthos Moon in an episode of The Untouchables, titled "Mr. Moon", in which he played a San Francisco art and antique dealer who hijacked a supply of the paper used for printing United States currency. In a 1963 episode of the same series, titled The Gang War, he played Pamise Surigao, a liquor smuggler competing with the Chicago mob.

In the episode "Firebug" (January 27, 1963) of the anthology series GE True, hosted by Jack Webb, Buono played a barber in Los Angeles who is by night a pyromaniac. In the storyline, the United States Forest Service believes one arsonist is causing a series of fires in California.

Buono appeared in four episodes of Perry Mason. In season 5, (March 17, 1962), he portrayed Alexander Glovatsky, a small-town sculptor, in "The Case of the Absent Artist". In season 7, (April 2, 1964), he played John (Jack) Sylvester Fossette in "The Case of the Simple Simon". In season 8 (April 29, 1965), he played Nathon Fallon in "The Case of the Grinning Gorilla". In season 9, (February 27, 1966), he appeared in "The Case of the Twice Told Twist", the only color episode, as Ben Huggins, the ringleader of a car-stripping ring.

Buono played the villain King Tut on the television series Batman. A Jekyll-and-Hyde character, William McElroy is a timid Yale professor of Egyptology who, after being hit in the head with a brick at a peace rally, assumes the persona of the charismatic, monomaniacal Egyptian King Tut. When he suffers another blow to the head, the villain recovers his meek academic personality. The role, which proved to be the most frequently featured original villain in the series, was one of Buono's favorites because he was delighted at being able to overact without restraint.

He played another campy villain, "Mr. Memory", in a 1967 unsold TV pilot film based on the Dick Tracy comic strip, from the same producers as Batman and The Green Hornet.

Buono also played a scientist bent on world domination in the Voyage to the Bottom of the Sea in "The Cyborg".

Buono made a guest appearance as Hannibal Day in the Get Smart episode "Moonlighting Becomes You", originally airing January 2, 1970, and appeared three times as Dr. Blaine in the sitcom Harrigan and Son, starring Pat O'Brien and Roger Perry as a father-and-son team of lawyers. He appeared in a segment of Night Gallery titled "Satisfaction Guaranteed". He also appeared in an episode of Hawaii Five-O, "The $100,000 Nickel", in which he played the thief Eric Damien. It first aired on December 11, 1973. He made two memorable appearances on The Odd Couple, once in the episode "The Exorcists" and again in "The Rent Strike", where he portrayed Mr. Lovelace. In 1976, he appeared in the comedy The Practice, portraying Bernard in the episode "Jules and the Bum". He also made nine appearances on the 1977 series Man from Atlantis as the primary antagonist, Mr. Schubert.

=== Comedy record albums and comic poetry ===
In the 1970s, Buono released several comedy record albums which poked fun at his large stature, the first of which was Heavy!, as well as a book of comic poetry called It Could Be Verse. Heavy! sold well, reaching No. 66 in the US. He began to style himself as "the fat man from Batman". During guest appearances on The Tonight Show Starring Johnny Carson, he frequently recited his poetry. The most popular of his poems was "Fat Man's Prayer", a work often erroneously attributed to Dom DeLuise or Jackie Gleason. It included many widely quoted couplets such as:

We are what we eat, said a wise old man,
And Lord, if that's true, I'm a garbage can!

At oleomargarine I'll never mutter,
For the road to hell is spread with butter.

And cake is cursed, and cream is awful,
And Satan is hiding in every waffle.

Give me this day my daily slice—
But cut it thin and toast it twice.

=== Later career ===
In the late 1970s and in 1980, Buono played the millionaire father of the memory-impaired Reverend Jim Ignatowski on Taxi. Christopher Lloyd, the actor portraying his son, was the same age as Buono, who died before the end of the series. One episode was made where Jim learns to cope with his father's death.

In 1980, Buono appeared in the television film Murder Can Hurt You as Chief Ironbottom, a parody of the title character from Ironside. His later roles were more of pompous intellectuals and shady con men, although he also played straight roles. In the miniseries Backstairs at the White House (1979), he portrayed President William Howard Taft. Buono also appeared on 4 different episodes of the ABC series Vega$ with Robert Urich, playing a sage and yet also street-wise Las Vegas casino high roller named 'Diamond Jim'.

== Death ==
Buono died of a heart attack at his home in Apple Valley, California, on New Year's Day 1982. He is entombed with his mother, Myrtle, in Greenwood Memorial Park in San Diego, but his name is not inscribed on the crypt.

== Personal life ==
Buono attended the University of San Diego.

Buono liked to read and write, and one of his main interests was Shakespeare. "The more you study him," he said, "the greater he grows." He was also highly regarded as a gourmet chef.

In regard to his relationships and the implicit questioning of his sexuality, Buono is quoted as saying, "I've heard or read about actors being asked the immortal question, 'Why have you never married?' They answer with the immortal excuse, 'I just haven't found the right girl.' Because I'm on the hefty side, no one's asked me yet. If they do, that's the answer I'll give. After all, if it was good enough for Monty Clift or Sal Mineo..." Like most gay actors at the time, Buono was closeted but lived with boyfriends. He referred to himself as a "conscientious objector" in the "morality revolution" of the 1960s.

== Filmography ==
Film
| Year | Title | Role | Notes |
|---|---|---|---|
| 1960 | The Story of Ruth | Guard | Uncredited |
| 1962 | What Ever Happened to Baby Jane? | Edwin Flagg | Nominated - Academy Award for Best Supporting Actor; Nominated - Golden Globe Award for Best Supporting Actor – Motion Picture |
| 1963 | My Six Loves | Gatecrasher | Uncredited |
| 1963 | 4 for Texas | Harvey Burden | |
| 1964 | The Strangler | Leo Kroll | |
| 1964 | Robin and the 7 Hoods | Deputy Sheriff Alvin Potts | |
| 1964 | Hush...Hush, Sweet Charlotte | Big Sam Hollis | |
| 1965 | The Greatest Story Ever Told | High Priest Sorak | |
| 1965 | Young Dillinger | Professor Hoffman | |
| 1966 | The Silencers | Tung-Tze | |
| 1967 | Who's Minding the Mint? | The Captain | |
| 1969 | Target: Harry | Mosul Rashi | Alternative title: How to Make It |
| 1969 | Big Daddy | A. Lincoln Beauregard | Alternative title: Paradise Road / Filmed in 1965. |
| 1969 | Boot Hill | Honey Fisher | |
| 1970 | Beneath the Planet of the Apes | Adiposo/Fat Man | |
| 1970 | Up Your Teddy Bear | Lyle "Skippy" Ferns | |
| 1971 | The Mad Butcher | Otto Lehman | Alternative title: The Strangler of Vienna |
| 1971 | The Man with Icy Eyes | John Hammond | |
| 1971 | Temporada salvaje | | |
| 1972 | The Wrath of God | Jennings | |
| 1972 | Goodnight, My Love | Julius Limeway | Television film |
| 1972 | Northeast of Seoul | Portman | |
| 1973 | Arnold | The Minister | |
| 1974 | Moonchild | Maitre'd | |
| 1975 | The Chinese Caper | Everett Maddox | Alternative title: China Heat |
| 1978 | The Evil | The Devil | Cameo appearance |
| 1979 | Better Late Than Never | Dr. Zoltan Polos | |
| 1980 | The Man with Bogart's Face | Commodore Anastas | Alternative title: Sam Marlow, Private Eye |
| 1980 | Murder Can Hurt You | Chief Ironbottom | |
| 1982 | The Flight of Dragons | Aragh | Voice; released posthumously (final film role) |

Television
| Year | Title | Role | Notes |
|---|---|---|---|
| 1958 | Sea Hunt | Seminard | 1 episode |
| 1960 | Bourbon Street Beat | Joe Leslie | 1 episode |
| 1960 | 77 Sunset Strip | Bongo Bennie | 2 episodes |
| 1961 | The Everglades | Wikkament | 1 episode |
| 1961 | Hawaiian Eye | Malegra | 1 episode |
| 1961 | Hawaiian Eye | Egeloff | 1 episode |
| 1961 | 77 Sunset Strip | Gunther | 1 episode |
| 1961 | 77 Sunset Strip | Charlie Case | 1 episode |
| 1961 | Surfside 6 | Mr. Beamish | 1 episode |
| 1961 | The Untouchables | Melanthos Moon | 1 episode |
| 1962 | The New Breed | Manrique | 1 episode |
| 1964 | Perry Mason | John Sylvester Fossette | 1 episode |
| 1962 | Perry Mason | Alexander Glovatsky | 1 episode |
| 1962 | 77 Sunset Strip | Stanison | 1 episode |
| 1962 | The Untouchables | Parnise Surigao | 1 episode |
| 1963 | GE True | Charles Colvin | 1 episode |
| 1963 | 77 Sunset Strip | Victor Traymund | 1 episode |
| 1965 | Perry Mason | Nathon Fallon | 1 episode |
| 1965 | The Wild Wild West | Juan Manolo | 1 episode |
| 1965 | Voyage to the Bottom of the Sea | Dr. Tabor Ulrich | 1 episode |
| 1965 | Bob Hope Presents the Chrysler Theatre | General Leo Chareet | 3 episodes |
| 1966 | The Man from U.N.C.L.E. | Colonel Hubris | 1 episode |
| 1966–1968 | Batman | Professor William McElroy / King Tut | 10 episodes |
| 1966 | Perry Mason | Ben Huggins | 1 episode |
| 1966 | I Spy | Karafatma | 1 episode |
| 1966 | The Wild Wild West | Count Carlos Maria Vincenzo Robespierre Manzeppi | 2 episodes |
| 1967 | The Girl from U.N.C.L.E. | Sir Cecil Seabrook | 1 episode |
| 1967 | T.H.E. Cat | General Burek | 1 episode |
| 1967 | Daniel Boone | Milo Quaife | 1 episode |
| 1969 | The Flying Nun | Marko "The Magnificent" Antonio | 1 episode |
| 1969 | Here's Lucy | Mr. Vermillion | 1 episode |
| 1969 | It Takes a Thief | Mr. Kent | 1 episode |
| 1970 | Get Smart | Hannibal Day | 1 episode |
| 1970 | O'Hara, U.S. Treasury | Al Connors | 1 episode |
| 1972 | The Mod Squad | Alexander Vlahos (Sanctuary) | 1 episode |
| 1973 | Mannix | Hamilton Starr | 1 episode |
| 1973 | Orson Welles Great Mysteries | Sam Adelbert | 1 episode |
| 1973 | Hawaii Five-O | Eric Damien | 1 episode |
| 1973-1975 | The Odd Couple | Dr. Clove / Hugo Lovelace | 2 episodes |
| 1976 | Ellery Queen | Dr. Friedland | 1 episode |
| 1976 | The Tony Randall Show | Judge Bernard Gluck | 1 episode |
| 1976 | Alice | Mr. James | 1 episode |
| 1977 | The Hardy Boys/Nancy Drew Mysteries | Seth Taylor | 1 episode |
| 1977 | Man from Atlantis | Mr. Schubert | 9 episodes |
| 1979 | Supertrain | Misto | 1 episode |
| 1979 | Backstairs at the White House | William Howard Taft | 2 episodes |
| 1980 | Taxi | James Caldwell | 1 episode |
| 1980 | Fantasy Island | Dr. Albert Z. Fell | 1 episode |
| 1980–1981 | Vega$ | "Diamond" Jim | 4 episodes |
| 1981 | Here's Boomer | Dr. Frankenstein | 1 episode |

== Award nominations ==
| Year | Award | Result | Category | Film |
|---|---|---|---|---|
| 1962 | Academy Awards | Nominated | Best Supporting Actor | What Ever Happened to Baby Jane? |
| 1962 | Golden Globe Awards | Nominated | Best Supporting Actor | What Ever Happened to Baby Jane? |
| 1962 | Laurel Awards | Nominated | Top New Male Personality | - |
