= Murray Matheson =

U.S.-based Australian actor (1912–1985)

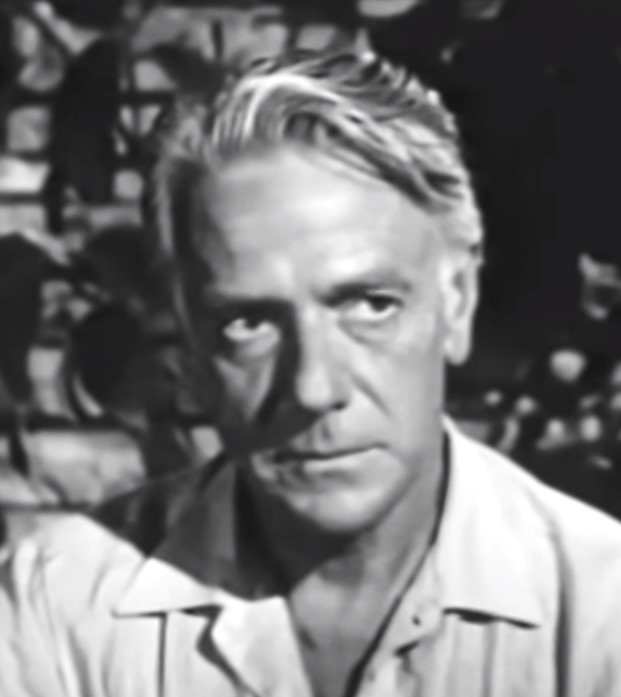
- Matheson in One Step Beyond (1960)
- Born: Sidney Murray Matheson; 1 July 1912; Casterton, Victoria, Australia
- Died: 25 April 1985 (aged 72); Woodland Hills, Los Angeles, California, U.S.
- Occupations: Actor: stage, film, television
- Years active: 1945–1983

Sidney Murray Matheson (1 July 1912 – 25 April 1985) was a U.S.-based Australian actor. He appeared on stage and in films and television programs until 1983.

== Biography ==
Matheson was born in Casterton, Australia in 1912 where he grew up on a 3,000-acre sheep station. When he was 12, he saw a production of Sally by a touring company, and that experience sparked his desire to be an actor.

His first principal stage performance was in the musical Roberta at Her Majesty's Theatre, Melbourne, Australia in 1934. His London debut was at the Palladium in Band Waggon (1939).

He made his New York debut as Captain Worthy in The Relapse, as part of the Theatre Guild (1950). Matheson performed in dozens of plays, including some major tours, until 1982.

Matheson's first film appearance was as Joe Lawson in The Way to the Stars, a.k.a. Johnny in the Clouds (1945). He played the clown in the classic The Twilight Zone episode "Five Characters in Search of an Exit". He made guest appearances in two 1964 episodes of CBS's Perry Mason: once as murder victim B.K. Doran in "The Case of the Accosted Accountant", and once as murderer Howard Hopkins in "The Case of the Wooden Nickels".

Some of his best-known film and television roles include:

- Felix Mulholland in the NBC Banacek series
- Benjamin Ovington in the movie How to Succeed in Business Without Really Trying (1967)
- The Clown in the Twilight Zone episode "Five Characters in Search of an Exit"
- Mr. Agee in the "Kick the Can" segment of The Twilight Zone: The Movie (1983)
- Dr. John Keith in the film Love Is a Many-Splendored Thing (1955)
- Talbot in the "Why Wait Until Uncle Kevin Dies" episode of Hawaii Five-O (1973) Season 6, episode 8.

In 1960 Matheson appeared as Alexander on the TV western Laramie on the episode titled "Duel at Parkinson Town." In 1960–61, he was cast as Geoffrey Carey in "The Archer's Ring" and as the High Priest in "The Perils of Penrose", respectively, on the ABC series, Adventures in Paradise, starring Gardner McKay. In 1961, he played the lead guest-starring role in the episode "A Rope for Charlie Munday" on another ABC adventure series, The Islanders, co-starring William Reynolds. In 1969, he guest starred as an Australian warlock in Bewitched season 5 episode 28, " Samantha's Good News". In 1970, he appeared in an episode of the ABC crime drama The Silent Force, and in 1978 he appeared in the "Murder! Murder!" episode of the NBC crime drama The Eddie Capra Mysteries. In 1982 he made an appearance on The Facts of Life S4 E11.

Matheson's ashes were scattered into the Pacific Ocean.

== Filmography ==
Year	Title	Role	Notes
1945	The Way to the Stars	Joe Lawson	
1945	Journey Together	Lancaster Crew	
1946	School for Secrets	Wing Commander Allen	
1948	The Secret Tunnel	Mr. Henderson	
1949	The Fool and the Princess	Graham Ballard	
1952	Hurricane Smith	Dr. Whitmore	
1952	Plymouth Adventure	Christopher Martin	Uncredited
1952	Botany Bay	Reverend Mortimer Thynne	
1953	Jamaica Run	Inspector Mole	
1953	Flight to Tangier	Franz Kovac	
1953	King of the Khyber Rifles	Major Ian MacAllister	
1954	The Bamboo Prison	Comrade Clayton	
1955	Love is a Many-Splendored Thing	Dr. John Keith	
1958	Alfred Hitchcock Presents	James St. George Bernard Bowlby	Season 3 Episode 37: "The Canary Sedan"
1958	Alfred Hitchcock Presents	Oliver Teleton	Season 4 Episode 10: "Tea Time"
1958	Peter Gunn	Phillip Lasdowne	S1:E17 "Missing Night Watchman"
1960	Laramie	Alexander	S2:E12 "Duel at Parkinson Town"
1960	One Step Beyond	Bentley	Season 2 Episode 32: "Delia"
1961	Alfred Hitchcock Presents	Cyril Hardeen	Season 6 Episode 20: "The Throwback"
1961	Thriller	Thomas Edward Griffith	Season 1 Episode 17: "The Poisoner"
1961	Thriller	Andrew Lawrence	Season 2 Episode 8: "Letter to a Lover"
1961	The Twilight Zone	Clown	Season 3 Episode 14: "Five Characters in Search of an Exit"
1961	The Islanders	Charlie Munday	Episode: "A Rope for Charlie Munday"
1962	The Notorious Landlady	Neighbour	Uncredited
1963	Wall of Noise	Jack Matlock	
1963	The Fugitive	Earl Morehead	Season 1 Episode 9: "Ticket to Alaska"
1964	Perry Mason	B.K. Doran	Season 7 Episode 14: "The Case of the Accosted Accountant"
1964	Perry Mason	Howard Hopkins	Season 8 Episode 12: "The Case of the Wooden Nickels"
1964	The Alfred Hitchcock Hour	Charles Justin	Season 2 Episode 19: "Murder Case"
1964	Signpost to Murder	Dr. Graham	
1965	Get Smart	Devonshire	Season 1 Episode 22: "Smart The Assassin"
1965	My Favorite Martian	Filbert	Season 3 Episode 12: "Avenue C Mob"
1965	The Man from U.N.C.L.E	The Maharajah	S1:E17 "The Yellow Scarf Affair"
1966	Assault on a Queen	Captain	
1967	How to Succeed in Business Without Really Trying	Benjamin Ovington	Movie
1967	The F.B.I.	Henry Dodd	Season 2 Episode 24: "Flight Plan"
1967	The Invaders	Dr. Reynard	Season 1 Episode 11: "The Ivy Curtain"
1967	The Girl from U.N.C.L.E.	Dr. Merek	Season 1 Episode 28: "The High and the Deadly Affair"
1968	Star!	Bankruptcy Judge	Uncredited
1968	In Enemy Country		Uncredited
1969	Explosion	Owner of Jaguar	Movie
1969	Bewitched	John Van Millwood	S5:E28 "Samantha's Good News"
1970	The F.B.I.	Murray Elders	S5:E19 "The Diamond Millstone"
1970	The Silent Force	Valentine Estes	Season 1 Episode 2: "The Hero"
1970	It Takes a Thief	Harry Fulham	S3:E21 "The Suzie Simone Caper"
1970	McCloud	Grantley	S1:E4: "The Stage is All the World"
1971	McCloud	George Lincoln	Season 2 Episode 4: "The Disposal Man"
1971	Marcus Welby MD	Dr. Stoddard	Season 3 Episode 14: "Cross Match"
1971	Mannix	Snowy Bartlett	Season 6 Episode 14: "Light and Shadow"
1972	A Fan's Notes	Clarke Institute Doctor	
1972	Banyon	Charles Troy	Season 1 Episode 14: "Just Once"
1972-1974	Banacek	Felix Mulholland	16 episodes
1972	Hec Ramsey	Lionel Harlock	Season 1 Episode 2: "Hangman's Wages"
1973	Marcus Welby MD	Edward Liddell	Season 4 Episode 16: "A Necessary End"
1973	Hawaii Five-0	Talbot	S6:E8 "Why Wait Till Uncle Kevin Dies?"
1973	Here's Lucy	Professor Dietrich	S5:E19 "Lucy and The Professor"
1973	Circle of Fear	Mathews	S2:E9 "The Phantom of Herald Square"
1973	McMillan and Wife	Angus McPhee	S2:E7 "Two Dollars on Trouble to Win"
1973	Ghost Story	Mathews	S1:E22 "The Phantom of Herald Square"
1973	Night Gallery	Dr. Strang	Season 3 Episode 14: "The Doll of Death"
1974	The Magician	Walter Moran	S1:E18 "The Illusion of the Fatal Arrow"
1974	Kolchak:The Night Stalker	Mr. Lane-Mariot	Season 1 Episode 11: "Horror in The Heights"
1975	Marcus Welby MD	Lucky	Season 6 Episode 24: "Loser in a Dead Heat"
1975	Hawaii Five-0	Lord Danby	S8:E4 "Termination with Extreme Prejudice"
1975	The Manhunter	Major Markley	Season 1 Episode 18: "The Seventh Man"
1975	S.W.A.T.	Cyrus Porter	Season 1 Episode 8: "The Bravo Enigma"
1975	S.W.A.T.	Armand	Season 2 Episode 14: "Murder by Fire"
1975	McMillan and Wife	Aaron Hildreth	Season 4 Episode 5: "Night Train to L.A"
1976	The Tony Randall Show	Judge Burnside	S1:E9 "Case: Mario Strikes Again"
1976	Phyllis	Charles Plunkett	Season 1 Episode 21: "Leo's Suicide"
1977	Family	Sandor Pratt	Season 2 Episode 11: "An Eye to The Future"
1977	Sugar Time	DeForest	S1:E2 "Witty, Urbane And Erudite"
1977	Tail Gunner Joe	Publisher	TV movie
1978	Charlie's Angels	Leland Swinnerton	Season 2 Episode 22: "Mother Goose is Running for His Life"
1978	Rabbit Test	Dr. Mario Lowell	1978 Movie
1978	Battlestar Galactica	Specter (Voice)	Season 1 Episode 9: "The Young Lords" (uncredited)
1979	Battlestar Galactica	Statesman Geller	Season 1 Episode 17: "Greetings from Earth"
1979	Vega$	Phillip Grayson	Season 1 Episode 12: "Ghost Of The Ripper"
1979	Hart to Hart	Martin Hyde-Jones	Season 1 Episode 5: "Death in the Slow Lane"
1979	Mary and Joseph: A Story of Faith	Zacharias	TV movie
1980	Angel on My Shoulder	The Stranger	TV movie
1981	Three's Company	Roger	Season 6 Episode 7: "Two Flew Over the Cuckoo's Nest"
1981	The Million Dollar Face	Sir Douglas Devereux	TV movie
1982	The Facts of Life	Professor Henry Clayton	Season 4 Episode 11: "September Song"
1982	The Great Detective		Season 4 Episode 4: "Star of Bengal"
1982	Tucker's Witch	Nathan Bly	Season 1 Episode 2: "Big Mouth"
1983	Twilight Zone: The Movie	Mr. Agee	(segment "Kick the Can")
1983	Newhart	Carl	Season 2 Episode 3: "Animal Attractions"

== Sources ==
- Biography at FilmReference.com
