= Kwan Hi Lim =

American actor

- Born: July 11, 1922; Maui, Hawaii
- Died: December 22, 2008 (aged 86); Honolulu, Hawaii
- Known for: Hawaii Five-O, Magnum, P.I.

Kwan Hi Lim (Hangul:임관희; July 11, 1922 – December 22, 2008) was an American character actor, best known for his role as Lt. Tanaka in the television series Magnum, P.I..

== Life and career ==
A native of Hawaii, he was one of the many locals who have been used in TV series and movies that took place on the islands. Lim appeared frequently on the TV series Hawaii Five-O, where he primarily portrayed villains. He was known to many as the recurring character Lt. Yoshi Tanaka of the Honolulu Police Department on Magnum, P.I..

Lim worked as an attorney since 1953, retiring in the 1990s. Lim had an office on the third floor of an old mixed-use office building on King Street in the Chinatown section of Honolulu. He once was asked why he always played the "bad guy" in the Hawaii Five-O series. He attributed it to "the way I squint my eyes, I just look evil". He got his first television role in his 40s when he was flirting with some tourists after coming from surfing and a casting director from Hawaii Five-O spotted him. Lim never had any formal training throughout his acting career. After Magnum, P.I., he acted sporadically and was a per diem judge for the Family Court system in Honolulu.

== Filmography ==
Year	Title	Roles	Notes
1970-1980	Hawaii Five-O	Various roles	25 episodes
1974	Inferno in Paradise	Melik	
1976	Acapulco Gold	Wang	
1979	Seven	Mr. Chen	
1983	Uncommon Valor	Jiang	
1982-1987	Magnum, P.I.	Lt. Yoshi Tanaka	26 episodes
1986	Murder, She Wrote	Lieutenant Tanaka	Episode: "Magnum on Ice"
1987	Hard Ticket to Hawaii	Henry	
1991	Goodbye Paradise	Dr. Lin	(final film role)
