= One of Our Own (1975 film) =

- Also known as: The Week of Fear
- Genre: Medical drama
- Created by: James E. Moser
- Screenplay by: Jack Laird
- Directed by: Richard C. Sarafian
- Starring: George Peppard; William Daniels; Louise Sorel; Strother Martin
- Composers: Jerry Fielding; Hal Mooney
- Country of origin: United States
- Original language: English

Production
- Executive producer: Matthew Rapf
- Producer: Jack Laird
- Cinematography: Howard Schwartz
- Editor: Douglas Stewart
- Running time: 100 minutes
- Production company: Universal Television

Original release
- Network: NBC
- Release: May 5, 1975

Related
- Doctors' Hospital

One of Our Own (also known as The Week of Fear) is a television film which aired on NBC on May 5, 1975. It served as the pilot for the series Doctors' Hospital.

It stars George Peppard as Dr. Jake Goodwin, chief of neurosurgery at the busy Lowell Memorial Hospital.

== Cast ==
| Actor | Role |
|---|---|
| George Peppard | Dr. Jake Goodwin |
| William Daniels | Dr. Moresby |
| Louise Sorel | Carole Simon |
| Strother Martin | LeRoy Atkins |
| Zohra Lampert | Dr. Norah Purcell |
| Oskar Homolka | Dr. Helmut Von Schulthers |
| Victor Campos | Dr. Felipe Ortega |
| Peter Hooten | Dr. Madison |
| Albert Paulsen | Dr. Janos Varga |
| Giorgio Tozzi | Sanantonio |
