= The Bravos =

1972 TV film

- Genre: Western
- Teleplay by: Christopher Knopf
- Story by: David Victor; Douglas Benton; Christopher Knopf
- Directed by: Ted Post
- Starring: George Peppard
- Music by: Leonard Rosenman
- Country of origin: United States
- Original language: English

Production
- Executive producer: David Victor
- Producer: Norman Lloyd
- Production locations: Sedona, Arizona; Flagstaff, Arizona
- Cinematography: Enzo A. Martinelli
- Editors: Robert L. Kimble; Michael R. McAdam
- Running time: 100 minutes
- Production companies: Groverton Productions; Universal Television

Original release
- Network: ABC
- Release: January 9, 1972

The Bravos is a 1972 American Western television film directed by Ted Post and starring George Peppard.

== Plot ==
The commander of an isolated frontier cavalry post tries to stop an Indian war and find his son, who has been kidnapped.

== Cast ==
- George Peppard as Major John David Harkness
- Pernell Roberts as Jackson Buckley
- Belinda Montgomery as Heller Chase
- L.Q. Jones as Ben Lawler
- George Murdock as Captain MacDowell
- Barry Brown as Garratt
- Dana Elcar as Captain Detroville
- John Kellogg as Sgt Major Marcy
- Bo Svenson as Raeder
- Vincent Van Patten as Peter Harkness
- Joaquín Martínez as Santanta (as Joanquin Martinez)
- Randolph Mantooth as 2nd Lt Lewis
- Clint Ritchie as Corporal Love
- Michael Bow as Sgt Boyd

== Production ==
In December 1969 it was announced Christopher Knopf had been signed to write The Bravos a movie for viewing on the ABC television network and the basis for a new series. Producer David Victor said he wanted the series to be an "adult Western".

Peppard's casting was announced in December 1970. It was Peppard's first television movie. "An actor acts," he said. "It's what he does and he must go where the work is. If television is the last media where we can find suitable roles then I'm happy to be back in it."

The film was shot in Arizona, finishing in January 1971. It was partly filmed at "Fort Delivery" a fort 50 miles from Flagstaff that was built for the 1963 film movie A Distant Trumpet.

The movie was not picked up for a TV series.
