= Albert Paulsen =

Ecuadorian-American actor (1925–2004)

- Paulsen in 1964
- Born: Alberto Paulson Andrade; December 13, 1925; Guayaquil, Ecuador
- Died: April 25, 2004 (aged 78); Los Angeles, California, U.S.
- Resting place: Calverton National Cemetery, New York, U.S.
- Other names: Albert Andrade Paulson; Albert Andrade Paulsen
- Citizenship: United States
- Years active: 1962–1988

Albert Paulsen (born Albert Paulson Andrade; December 13, 1925 – April 25, 2004) was an Ecuadorian-American actor who appeared in many American television series beginning in the 1960s, playing characters primarily of European origin.

== Biography ==
He was born in Guayaquil, Ecuador. The son of Alfredo Paulson Moulis and Zoila María Andrade Flor, he had two siblings, brothers Alfredo Paulson Andrade and Juan Paulson Andrade (the latter of whom survived Paulsen). He studied for three years at the German School in Quito and, in 1933, returned to Guayaquil, where he attended the Cristóbal Colón and San José schools.

After emigrating to the United States, he changed his surname from Paulson to Paulsen at some point. He became a life member of The Actors Studio, Paulsen won an Emmy Award in 1964 for the Bob Hope Presents the Chrysler Theatre presentation One Day in the Life of Ivan Denisovich, an historical novel by Aleksandr Solzhenitsyn.

Paulsen was a graduate of the Neighborhood Playhouse School of the Theatre studying under Sanford Meisner. Paulsen died of natural causes in Los Angeles, aged 78.

== Filmography ==
=== Film ===
Year	Title	Role	Notes
1962	All Fall Down	Captain Ramirez	
1962	The Manchurian Candidate	Zilkov	
1966	The Three Sisters	Kulygin. Fyodor Illich	
1967	Mr. Gunn	Nick Fusco	
1968	How to Steal the World	Dr. Kurt Erikson	
1969	Che!	Capt. Vasquez	
1971	Mrs. Pollifax-Spy	Perdido	
1973	The Laughing Policeman	Henry Camerero	
1976	The Next Man	Hamid	
1981	Eyewitness	Mr. Sokolow	
1985	Dikiy veter	Maj. Ted Kegan	Alternate title: "Wild Wind"
1988	Ransom	General von Brock / Bruno Hasse	

=== Television ===
Year	Title	Role	Notes
1951	Lux Video Theatre	German Man Number Two	Season 2 Episode 8: "Cafe Ami"
1954	The Philco Television Playhouse		Season 6 Episode 13: "The Broken Fist"
1954	Armstrong Circle Theatre	Juan	Season 4 Episode 38: "The Use of Dignity"
1954	Goodyear Television Playhouse		Season 4 Episode 4: "Thunder of Silence"
1957	Studio One	Al	Season 9 Episode 31: "Babe in the Woods"
1958	The Investigator		Season 1 Episode 3: "Episode #1.3"
1959–1960	Camera Three	Guillermo	2 episodes
1960	Buick-Electra Playhouse	Albert	Season 1 Episode 3: "The Snows of Kilimanjaro"
1961	Frontier Circus	Rodales	Season 1 Episode 6: "Karina"
1962	The Defenders	Mr. Sazeran	Season 1 Episode 21: "The Locked Room"
1962	The United States Steel Hour	Ramirez	Season 9 Episode 15: "Two Black Kings"
1962	The Untouchables	Max Zenner	Season 4 Episode 5: "The Pea"
1962–1963	G.E. True	Vik / Josef Gabchik	3 episodes
1962–1966	Combat!	Carl Dorfmann / Gen. Von Strelitz / Dorfmann / Col. Bruener	4 episodes
1963	The Gallant Men	General Kile	Season 1 Episode 20: "Operation Secret"
1963	General Hospital	Gen. Gastineau	
1963	The Lloyd Bridges Show	Paul Kolar	Season 1 Episode 30: "Freedom Is for Those Who Want It"
1963	77 Sunset Strip	Rudolph Gerhardt / Toller Vengrin	2 episodes
1963–1965	Bob Hope Presents the Chrysler Theatre	Lieutenant Volkovoi / Avatin	3 episodes
1964	Channing	Professer Leon Fyfe	Season 1 Episode 25: "Christmas Day Is Breaking Wan"
1964	Selena	Designer	TV Short
1964–1968	The Man from U.N.C.L.E.	Major Vicek / Dr. Kurt Erikson	3 episodes
1965	The Farmer's Daughter	Oscar Hummingbird	Season 2 Episode 18: "The Oscar Hummingbird Story"
1965	Memorandum for a Spy	Avatin	TV Movie
1965	Kraft Suspense Theatre	Sif Barani	Season 2 Episode 26: "The Safe House"
1965	I Spy	Ramon	Season 1 Episode 6: "The Loser"
1965	12 O'Clock High	Col. Hans Dieter / Arn Borg	2 episodes
1965	Burke's Law	James Gunnar Ketterback	Season 3 Episode 11: "Whatever Happened to Adriana and Why Won't She Stay Dead?"
1966	The Trials of O'Brien	Lopert	Season 1 Episode 16: "The 10-Foot, 6-Inch Pole"
1966	The F.B.I.	Nagry	Season 1 Episode 18: "The Sacrifice"
1966	Seaway	Robert Ballantyre	Season 1 Episode 20: "Dead Reckoning"
1966	Jericho	Major Bruschke	Season 1 Episode 2: "A Jug of Wine, a Loaf of Bread, and Pow!"
1966–1968	The Rat Patrol	Colonel Von Helbing / Major von Brugge	2 episodes
1966–1970	Mission: Impossible	Joseph Baresh / Eric Stavak / General Ernesto Neyron / Eric Bergman / Albert Zembra	5 episodes
1967	Run for Your Life	Emile Marnet	Season 2 Episode 30: "The Word Would Be Goodbye"
1968	N.Y.P.D.	Morado	Season 1 Episode 17: "The Patriots"
1968	The Flying Nun	Pedro Alvarez	Season 1 Episode 24: "Cyrano de Bertrille"
1968	Call to Danger	Andre Kellman	TV Movie
1968	Premiere	Andre Kellman / Linde	2 episodes
1968	The Name of the Game	Humberto Benitez	Season 1 Episode 15: "The Revolutionary"
1969–1980	Hawaii Five-O	Charley Bombay / Josef Sarpa / Edmonds / Adrian Cassell	4 episodes
1970	The Silent Force	Mr. Allyn	Season 1 Episode 13: "The Octopus"
1971	The High Chaparral	Eduardo Nervo	Season 4 Episode 14: "The New Lion of Sonora"
1971	A World Apart	Dr. Neil Stevens	2 episodes
1973	Young Dr. Kildare	Frank Gela	Episode: "The Don"
1973	Search	Henri Danzig	Season 1 Episode 12: "Let Us Prey"
1973	Carola	Col. Kroll	TV Movie
1973	Griff	Omar	Season 1 Episode 5: "Marked for Murder"
1974	Police Story	Reggie	Season 1 Episode 14: "Cop in the Middle"
1974	Hawkins	Teddy Osterman	Season 1 Episode 6: "Murder on the Thirteenth Floor"
1974	The Missiles of October	Ambassador Anatoly Dobrynin	TV Movie
1974	The Rockford Files	Kurt	Season 1 Episode 13: "Profit and Loss, Part 2: Loss"
1975	Medical Center	Count Scarpi	Season 6 Episode 18: "Crown of Thorns"
1975	Movin' On	Ernest	Season 1 Episode 18: "Ammo"
1975	The Odd Couple	Boris Kalnikov	Season 5 Episode 19: "The Roy Clark Show"
1975	Search for the Gods	Tarkanian	TV Movie
1975	Kolchak: The Night Stalker	Dr. James Verhyden	Season 1 Episode 20: "The Sentry"
1975	One of Our Own	Dr. Janos Varga	TV Movie
1975	Starsky and Hutch	Tom Lockly	Season 1 Episode 15: "Shootout"
1975–1976	Doctors' Hospital	Janos Varga	9 episodes (Recurring role)
1976	Louis Armstrong - Chicago Style	The Man	TV Movie
1976	Joe Forrester		Season 1 Episode 18: "The Invaders"
1976	Switch	Gassman	Season 2 Episode 6: "Quicker Than the Eye"
1977	Charlie's Angels	Rabitch	Season 1 Episode 15: "Angels on a String"
1977	Kojak	Shelley Briscoe	Season 4 Episode 21: "Monkey on a String"
1977	McNamara's Band	General Zimhoff	TV Movie
1978	The Gypsy Warriors	SS Colonel Schlager	TV Movie
1978	Columbo	Vincent Pauley	Season 7 Episode 5: "The Conspirators"
1978	Wonder Woman	Crichton	Season 3 Episode 1: "My Teenage Idol Is Missing"
1979	Trapper John, M.D.	The Sheik	Season 1 Episode 10: "The Surrogate"
1979	The Girl Who Saved the World	Anthony Korf	TV Movie
1979	Stop Susan Williams	Anthony Korf	4 episodes
1980	Galactica 1980	General Yodel	2 episodes
1981	Side Show	Scholl	TV Movie
1981–1982	Quincy M.E.	Steigler / Klavick	2 episodes
1983	Ryan's Four		Season 1 Episode 0: "Ryan's Four"
1983	Manimal	Russian Agent	Season 1 Episode 3: "Night of the Scorpion"
1984	Automan	Frank Ladrone	Season 1 Episode 9: "Murder MTV"
1985	Knight Rider	Mr. C	Season 3 Episode 17: "The Nineteenth Hole"
1985	Airwolf	Shrankov	Season 3 Episode 5: "Crossover"
1986	Scarecrow and Mrs. King	Serge Krutiov	Season 3 Episode 22: "All the World's a Stage"
1986	The Wizard		Season 1 Episode 1: "El Dorado"
