= Mira Rostova =

American actress (1909–2009)

- Born: April 10, 1909; Saint Petersburg, Russia
- Died: January 28, 2009 (aged 99); New York City, U.S.

Mira Rostova (née Rosovskaya; April 10, 1909 – January 28, 2009) was a Russian-American actress turned acting teacher, best known for her own variation of method acting that she used in coaching Montgomery Clift. Her other students included Armand Assante, Alec Baldwin, Peter Gallagher, Jessica Lange, Zohra Lampert, Jerry Orbach, A.J. Benza and Madonna (who attended approximately half a dozen class sessions, working on scenes from Tennessee Williams' Summer and Smoke and Isherwood's I Am a Camera).

== Early life ==
Mira Rosovskaya was born on April 10, 1909, in Saint Petersburg, Russia. She fled to Switzerland after the 1917 Russian Revolution and then Hamburg, Germany, where she began acting. She also acted in Vienna. She moved to France after the rise of the Nazi party and reached the United States by way of England. In the U.S., she abbreviated her surname to Rostova.

== Career ==
Rostova was accepted on a scholarship by Robert Lewis. She was cast as a fake witch doctor in Mexican Mural, an experimental play directed by Lewis, when she first met Clift who was also in the play. Gradually, Rostova played an increasing role in his acting career, discussing for hours the roles he should accept and the way he should act in them. Patricia Bosworth, Clift's biographer, described how Rostova had been hired on the payroll as Clift's coach while he was starring in films including A Place in the Sun and The Heiress.

Rostova was a fixture in his dressing room by 1945, when Clift had a lead role in You Touched Me!, a play by Tennessee Williams and Donald Windham. Clift became frustrated living at home with his mother and Rostova moved him into her apartment, while she moved out and found another place to live. During the filming of Alfred Hitchcock's 1953 film I Confess, Rostova stood behind a pillar and Clift looked over for her approval. During the filming of the 1949 drama The Heiress, his co-star Olivia de Havilland said that Clift would look in the opposite direction.

While other notable acting teachers such as Uta Hagen and Lee Strasberg also acted themselves, Rostova made few appearances of her own on stage or film, though she did perform the role of Nina in her own translation of Anton Chekhov's The Seagull, which she staged Off Broadway with Clift in 1954. Brooks Atkinson, reviewing in The New York Times, called it an "interesting performance" of "an incomparably beautiful play", saying that "Rostova as Nina is handicapped by a heavy accent. She is further handicapped by a florid style alien to the whole spirit of Chekhov", though he called Clift's performance as Constantin "beautifully expressed without any foolish pathology".

Elia Kazan banished her from the set of the 1960 film Wild River after a single day of filming. In Richard Schickel's 2005 biography of Kazan, he describes how she positioned herself behind the director during filming and nodded or shook her head as Clift was acting, but Kazan was unwilling to have her as a co-director.

== Death ==
Rostova died at age 99 on January 28, 2009, in a Manhattan nursing home.
