= Elizabeth Ashley =

American actress

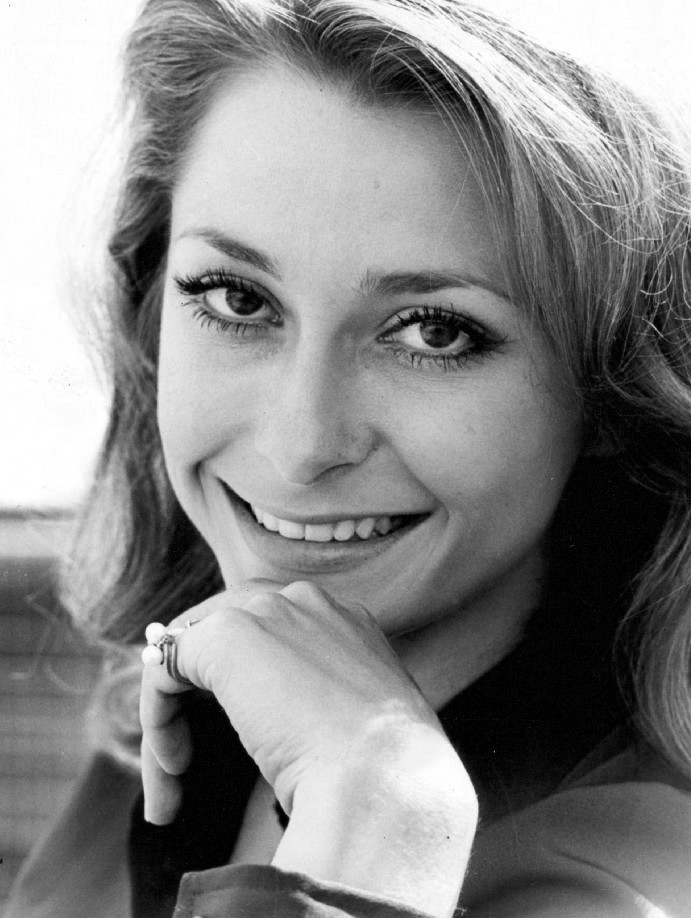
- Ashley in 1971
- Born: Elizabeth Ann Cole; August 30, 1939 (age 87); Ocala, Florida, U.S.
- Education: Neighborhood Playhouse School of the Theatre
- Occupation: Actress
- Years active: 1960–present
- Known for: Take Her, She's Mine; The Carpetbaggers; Evening Shade
- Spouses: James Farentino (m. 1962; div. 1965) George Peppard (m. 1966; div. 1972) James McCarthy (m. 1975; div. 1981)
- Children: 1
- Awards: Tony Award for Best Featured Actress in a Play; American Theater Hall of Fame

Elizabeth Ann Cole (born August 30, 1939), known professionally as Elizabeth Ashley, is an American actress of theatre, film, and television. She has been nominated for three Tony Awards, winning once in 1962 for Take Her, She's Mine. Ashley was also nominated for the BAFTA and Golden Globe awards for her supporting performance in The Carpetbaggers (1964), and was nominated for an Emmy Award in 1991 for Evening Shade. Ashley was a guest on The Tonight Show Starring Johnny Carson 24 times. She appeared in several episodes of In the Heat of the Night as Maybelle Chesboro. She also appeared in an episode of Mannix, "The Dark Hours", in 1974. She is a 2024 inductee into the American Theater Hall of Fame.

== Early life ==
Ashley was born Elizabeth Ann Cole in Ocala, Florida, to music teacher Arthur Kingman Cole and the former Lucille Ayer. She grew up in Baton Rouge, Louisiana. Ayer left Elizabeth's father shortly after she was born and did not remarry. Ashley compared her to the Southern matriarch Amanda Wingfield from The Glass Menagerie.

Ashley left Louisiana State University after her freshman year and moved to New York. There, she studied acting at the Neighborhood Playhouse School of the Theatre in the same class as Jessica Walter and Brenda Vaccaro. She supported herself financially by working as the Jell-O pudding girl on a television program and as a showroom model.

== Career ==
Ashley has acted in film, television, and theater roles in seven decades, starting in the 1960s.

=== Theater career ===
Ashley won a Tony Award for Best Featured Actress in a Play for Take Her, She's Mine.

In 1963, she starred as the female lead, Corie, in the original Broadway production of Neil Simon's Barefoot in the Park. Ashley earned a Tony nomination for the role. The play was also a significant success that ran for four consecutive years. After a mental breakdown, Ashley took a sabbatical from the play to attempt a film career in Hollywood. At the end of the break, she decided to leave permanently, paying producer Saint Subber $35,000 in a breach-of-contract penalty. Ashley resented Subber for exacting the penalty when the show was financially successful, but said she regretted leaving due to her appreciation for director Mike Nichols.

After ten years in Hollywood, Ashley returned to Broadway as Maggie the Cat in the American Shakespeare Theatre's 1974 revival of Tennessee Williams' Cat on a Hot Tin Roof. Her performance earned strong praise from critics. John Simon wrote that Ashley "performs with such astonishing, such uncanny precision that not even her heady loveliness distracts us from her acting. Miss this performance at your soul's peril." Mel Gussow wrote that she "richly conveyed" Maggie's complexities. Clive Barnes concluded that while she was praised extensively for the role, she was still undersold. Ashley received a Tony nomination for the performance.

Ashley appeared on Broadway as Dr. Livingstone in Agnes of God (1982) and was a replacement in the role of Mattie Fae during the original Broadway run of August: Osage County.

=== Film and television career ===
She has been featured in major motion pictures over five decades, including early roles in The Carpetbaggers (1964), Ship of Fools (1965), and The Third Day (1965). Her other film credits include The Marriage of a Young Stockbroker (1971), Rancho Deluxe (1975), Coma (1978), Paternity (1981), Dragnet (1987), and Vampire's Kiss (1989), and she starred as the villain in the controversial film Windows (1980).

She first appeared with Burt Reynolds in a 1969 season episode of Love, American Style, then later in the movie Paternity in 1981, as a guest star in his television series B.L. Stryker in 1989, and finally as a cast member in his final television series, Evening Shade, from 1990 to 1994 as Aunt Frieda Evans.

Ashley had the role of Kate in Sandburg's Lincoln, a six-part dramatization that ran on NBC in the mid-1970s. Her other television appearances include the 1987 miniseries The Two Mrs. Grenvilles, and guest roles in Ben Casey; Route 66; Sam Benedict; Stoney Burke; The Six Million Dollar Man; Family; Miami Vice; Caroline in the City; Mission: Impossible; Murder, She Wrote; Dave's World; Law & Order; Law & Order: Special Victims Unit; Touched by an Angel; The Larry Sanders Show; Homicide: Life on the Street; Russian Doll; and Better Things. She was featured in 14 episodes of the HBO series Treme as Aunt Mimi.

== Book ==
Ashley's autobiography Actress: Postcards from the Road was published in a hardcover edition on June 1, 1978, by M. Evans & Co (now part of the Rowman & Littlefield Publishing Group). A paperback publication followed on October 12, 1979, through Fawcett Publications.

== Personal life ==
Ashley is thrice married and divorced. Her first and second husbands were actors James Farentino and George Peppard. The latter was her leading man in her first movie, The Carpetbaggers (1964). The couple had a son, Christian. Her divorce from Peppard is rumored to have caused the cancellation of his television series Banacek. According to an unconfirmed story, he quit the show to prevent her from receiving a larger percentage of his earnings as part of their divorce settlement. Filmink called the account of Peppard in Ashley's memoirs "fascinating – paying tribute to his talent, charisma and kindness, as well as his violent, abusive, alcoholic nature."

At 25, Ashley retired from acting "to make a home for my husband, see that he had his dinner on time, realize myself as a woman." She resumed her career four years later. In a 1974 profile in The New York Times, she denounced her ex-spouse and the institution of marriage:

"A man I was married to once said to me, 'Everything you do I could hire done better.' [...] And I thought to myself, oh my God. Is that what it's about? Loving, in marriage, becomes for a woman doing for free what he can hire done better. Well, I don't care for that, myself. I found marriage to be mutilating, barbaric, inhumane. People get married for social reasons, for convenience, for emotional safety. It wasn't for me."

In 1975, Ashley married James McCarthy. They divorced in 1981. Between her second and third marriage, she also dated writer Tom McGuane and credits their liaison with reawakening a sexuality that she used when she portrayed Maggie in Cat on a Hot Tin Roof.

While starring in the long-running Barefoot in the Park on Broadway, Ashley suffered mental issues and checked into a psychiatric hospital. Though it was originally reported as bronchitis, the breakdown ended up informing her decision to leave the play entirely.

In the 1980s, Ashley injured herself in a sailing crash in the Caribbean and received major facial reconstructive surgery.

She is an Episcopalian and sits on the Advisory Board for the Episcopal Actors Guild.

== Filmography ==
=== Film ===
Year	Title	Role	Notes
1964	The Carpetbaggers	Monica Winthrop	
1965	Ship of Fools	Jenny Brown	
1965	The Third Day	Alexandria Mallory	
1971	The Marriage of a Young Stockbroker	Nan	
1972	When Michael Calls	Helen Connelly	
1973	Paperback Hero	Loretta	
1974	Golden Needles	Felicity	
1975	Rancho Deluxe	Cora Brown	
1975	92 in the Shade	Jeannie Carter	
1976	The Great Scout & Cathouse Thursday	Nancy Sue	
1976	One of My Wives Is Missing	Elizabeth	
1978	Coma	Mrs. Emerson	
1980	Windows	Andrea Glassen	
1981	Paternity	Sophia Thatcher	
1982	Split Image	Diana Stetson	
1986	Stagecoach	Dallas	
1987	Dragnet	Jane Kirkpatrick	
1988	Vampire's Kiss	Dr. Glaser	
1988	Dangerous Curves	Miss Reed	
1989	A Man of Passion	Gloria	
1995	Mallrats	Gov. Dalton	Extended cut only
1996	Shoot the Moon	Mrs. Comstock	
1997	Sleeping Together	Mrs. Tuccinini	
1998	Happiness	Diane Freed	
1999	Just the Ticket	Mrs. Paliski	
2000	Labor Pains	Janice	
2001	Home Sweet Hoboken	Beth Flowers	
2002	Hey Arnold!: The Movie	Mrs. Vitello (voice)	
2007	The Cake Eaters	Marg Kaminski	
2017	Fry Day	Deirdre	Short
2017	Just Getting Started	Lily	
2018	Severance	Francesca	Short
2018	Ocean's 8	Ethel	

=== Television ===
Year	Title	Role	Notes
1961	The Defenders	Joyce Harkavy	"The Prowler"
1962	The Nurses	Barbara Bowers	"The Barbara Bowers Story"
1962	Ben Casey	Jane Brewster	"And Even Death Shall Die"
1963	Route 66	Maria Cardenas	"The Cage Around Maria"
1963	Sam Benedict	Cindy Messerman	"Season for Vengeance"
1963	Stoney Burke	Donna Weston	"Tigress by the Tail"
1966	Run for Your Life	Dina Fuller	"The Grotenberg Mask"
1966	Hawk	Donna	"H Is for a Dirty Letter"
1969	The Skirts of Happy Chance	Laddie Turnbow	TV film
1969	The File on Devlin	Sally Devlin	TV film
1970	Love, American Style	Penny Dunbar	"Love and the Banned Book" (with Burt Reynolds)
1970	The Virginian	Faith Andrews	"The West vs. Colonel MacKenzie"
1970	Medical Center	Anne Forley	"Brink of Doom"
1971	Insight	Sally	"The War of the Eggs"
1971	Harpy	Marian	TV film
1971	The Face of Fear	Sally Dillman	TV film
1971	Mission: Impossible	Lois Stoner	"Encounter"
1972	When Michael Calls	Helen Connelly	ABC Movie of the Week
1972	Second Chance	Ellie Smith	ABC Movie of the Week
1972	Ghost Story	Karen Dover	"At the Cradle Foot"
1972	The Heist	Diane Craddock	ABC Movie of the Week
1972	Your Money or Your Wife	Laurel Plunkett	TV film
1973	Mission: Impossible	Andrea	"The Question"
1973	The Magician	Sally Baker	"Pilot"
1973	Police Story	Jannette Johnson	"Dangerous Games"
1973	The Six Million Dollar Man: The Solid Gold Kidnapping	Dr. Erica Bergner	ABC Movie of the Week
1974	Mannix	Karen Winslow	"The Dark Hours"
1974	Ironside	Laura Keyes	"Close to Your Heart"
1974	The F.B.I.	Claire	"Diamond Run"
1975	Lincoln	Kate Chase Sprague	"Sad Figure, Laughing"
1976	One of My Wives Is Missing	Elizabeth Corban	TV film
1977	Family	Elizabeth Kraft	"Lovers and Strangers"
1977	The War Between the Tates	Erica Tate	TV film
1978	Tom and Joann	Joan Hammil	TV film
1978	A Fire in the Sky	Sharon Allan	TV film
1982	Saturday Night Live	Herself (host)	"Elizabeth Ashley/Hall & Oates"
1983	Freedom to Speak	Jane Addams / Dorothea Dix	TV miniseries
1983	Svengali	Eve Swiss	TV film
1984	He's Fired, She's Hired	Freddie Fox	TV film
1985	The Love Boat	Nancy Bricker	2 episodes
1985	Cagney & Lacey	Michelle Zal	"The Psychic"
1985	The Hitchhiker	Mrs. Baxter	"Out of the Night"
1986	Stagecoach	Dallas	TV film
1987	The Two Mrs. Grenvilles	Babette Van Degan	TV miniseries
1987	Warm Hearts, Cold Feet	Blanche Webster	TV film
1987	Miami Vice	D.E.A. Agent Linda Colby	"Knock, Knock... Who's There?"
1988	Eisenhower and Lutz	Eleanor	"Pride and Prejudice"
1989	Alfred Hitchcock Presents	Karen Lawson / Kate Lawson	"Mirror Mirror"
1989	B.L. Stryker	Althea Campbell	"Blues for Buder"
1989	Hunter	Felicia Green	"A Girl Named Hunter"
1989	American Playwrights Theater: The One-Acts	Annie Sweeney	"The Rope"
1989	Murder, She Wrote	Vera Gerakaris	"Truck Stop"
1990	Blue Bayou	Lolly Fontenot	TV film
1990	Another World	Emma Frame Ordway	TV series
1990–1994	Evening Shade	Freida Evans	Main role
1991	Reason for Living: The Jill Ireland Story	Vicky	TV film
1991	Love and Curses... And All That Jazz	Emmalina	TV film
1992	In the Best Interest of the Children	Carla Scott	TV film
1993	The Larry Sanders Show	Elizabeth Ashley	"Off Camera"
1993	Harnessing Peacocks	Grandmother	TV film
1994	In the Heat of the Night	Maybelle Cheseboro	"Maybelle Returns"
1994	Law & Order	Gwen Young	"Second Opinion"
1995	The Buccaneers	Mrs. Closson	TV miniseries
1995	Burke's Law	Mary Burton	"Who Killed the Motor Car Maverick?"
1995	Women of the House	Elizabeth Ashley	"Women in Film"
1995	Murder, She Wrote	Emily Broussard Renwyck	"Big Easy Murder"
1995	Touched by an Angel	Sandy Latham	"Angels on the Air"
1996	Dave's World	Jeanette	"Double Fault"
1996	The Big Easy	Larissa Fontaine	"A Dead Man Is Hard to Find"
1996	All My Children	Madge Sinclair	TV series
1996	Hey Arnold!	Mrs. Vitello (voice)	"Arnold's Hat/Stoop Kid"
1996–97	Caroline in the City	Natalie Karinsky	"Caroline and Richard's Mom", "Caroline and the Bad Trip"
1997	The Ruth Rendell Mysteries	Margaret Lipton	"May and June: Part One"
1998	Hey Arnold!	Mrs. Vitello (voice)	"Part Time Friends/Biosquare"
1999	Homicide: Life on the Street	Madeline Pitt	"Truth Will Out"
1999	Law & Order: Special Victims Unit	Serena Benson	"Payback"
2010–2013	Treme	Aunt Mimi	Recurring role
2015	Understudies	Dotty Buggett	TV film
2019–2022	Russian Doll	Ruth Brenner	Main cast
2020	The Bold Type	Pam Sheard	"#Scarlet"
2020	Better Things	Miss Louise	"New Orleans"

=== Stage ===
Year	Title	Role	Notes
1959	The Highest Tree	Jane Ashe	Longacre Theatre, Broadway
1960	Roman Candle	Eleanor Winston/Elizabeth Brown (Understudy)	Cort Theatre, Broadway
1961	Mary, Mary	Mary McKellaway	Helen Hayes Theater, Broadway
1961	Take Her, She's Mine	Mollie Michaelson	Biltmore Theatre, Broadway
1963	Barefoot in the Park	Corie Bratter	Biltmore Theatre, Broadway
1972	Ring Around the Bathtub	Maggie Train	Martin Beck Theatre, Broadway
1974	Cat on a Hot Tin Roof	Maggie	Anta Theatre, Broadway
1975	The Skin of Our Teeth	Sabina	Mark Hellinger Theatre, Broadway
1976	Legend	Betsey-No-Name	Ethel Barrymore Theatre, Broadway
1977	Caesar and Cleopatra	Cleopatra	Palace Theatre, Broadway
1980	Hide and Seek	Jennifer Crawford	Belasco Theatre, Broadway
1982	Agnes of God	Doctor Martha Livingstone	Music Box Theatre, Broadway
1987	The Milk Train Doesn't Stop Here Anymore	Flora Goforth	WPA Theater, Off-Broadway
1990	When She Danced	Isadora	Playwrights Horizons, Off-Broadway
1995	Suddenly Last Summer	Mrs. Venable	Circle in the Square Theatre, Broadway
1996	The Red Devil Battery Sign	Woman Downtown	WPA Theater, Off-Broadway
1999	If Memory Serves	Diane Barrow	Pasadena Playhouse
2000	The Best Man	Mrs. Sue-Ellen Gamadge	Virginia Theatre, Broadway
2003	Enchanted April	Mrs. Graves	Belasco Theatre, Broadway
2008	Dividing the Estate	Stella	Booth Theatre, Broadway
2009	August: Osage County	Mattie Fae Aiken (Replacement)	Imperial Theatre, Broadway
2010	Me, Myself and I	Mother	Playwrights Horizons, Off-Broadway
2012	The Best Man	Mrs. Sue-Ellen Gamadge (Replacement)	Gerald Schoenfeld Theatre, Broadway
2014	You Can't Take It With You	Olga	Longacre Theatre, Broadway
2017	The Night of the Iguana	Judith Fellowes	American Repertory Theater, Massachusetts
