= Williamsburg: The Story of a Patriot =

1957 film by George Seaton

- Directed by: George Seaton
- Written by: Emmet Lavery
- Produced by: Don Roberts; William H. Wright
- Starring: Jack Lord; Leora Dana
- Cinematography: Haskell B. Boggs
- Edited by: Alma Macrorie
- Music by: Bernard Herrmann
- Distributed by: Paramount Pictures
- Release date: March 31, 1957
- Running time: 34 minutes
- Country: United States
- Language: English

Williamsburg: The Story of a Patriot, often called The Patriot, is a 1957 orientation film produced by Paramount Pictures and the Colonial Williamsburg Foundation. Directed by George Seaton, it features Jack Lord and Leora Dana as John and Anne Fry.

As of 2014, it is the longest-running movie, having been shown continually at the Colonial Williamsburg Visitor Center since March 31, 1957. On September 20, 2002, it was seen by its 30 millionth viewer. The film has a 34-minute running-time, and underwent digital restoration between 2001 and 2004.

== Overview ==
As museum orientation films go, Williamsburg: The Story of a Patriot is a landmark, both because of its high production values and structure.

It was filmed in May 1956 at Colonial Williamsburg. Whereas the usual 35mm flat-screen 1.33:1 ratio cinematography would have been considered extravagant for an orientation film, Williamsburg: The Story of a Patriot was filmed and exhibited in VistaVision, a high definition widescreen film process with approximately the same negative size as 35mm still (SLR 135) photography, also oriented (and traveling) horizontally through the camera. It was a unique VistaVision film in that it was shown with six-channel stereo sound, whereas most films in that process were either shown in mono or in Perspecta sound. The music for the film was composed and conducted by Bernard Herrmann, who was at the time best known for scoring several Alfred Hitchcock films.

Moreover, where previous museum orientation films (and many present day examples) are simple travelogues, with little or no narrative content, Williamsburg: The Story of a Patriot told the story of Virginia's role in American Independence (up to the point of voting to propose independence at the Second Continental Congress), from the point of view of John Fry (played by a young Jack Lord), a fictional Virginia planter elected to the House of Burgesses. While it was filmed almost entirely in and around the Colonial Williamsburg Historic Area, and points out a number of the historic buildings by name, it is overwhelmingly a dramatization of history, rather than a travelogue.

A pair of specially designed theaters, each seating 250 persons, were built for showing the film as part of the new visitors center being built at the time. It was previewed for an audience including the Governor of Virginia Thomas Stanley and members of the Virginia General Assembly on the evening of March 30, and formally opened March 31, 1957.

In the early 1960s, the film was translated into several languages for personal speakers that could be used by international visitors.

Showings of the film were temporarily suspended during the COVID-19 pandemic, but have since returned. It currently airs four times a day at the Colonial Williamsburg Regional Visitor Center, twice in the morning and twice in the afternoon.

== Restoration ==
By the 1990s the film was showing its age, with severe fading problems in the original negatives and differing shrinkage rates in the separation masters that had been made as a backup. As a result, even new prints looked no better than a 16mm orientation film would have looked.

In 2001, an extensive digital restoration effort was begun, the result of which debuted (in relatively conventional 70mm DTS prints) in 2004. This is generally regarded as coming as close as present-day technology permits to replicate the clarity of the film as originally shown in the late 1950s. It is estimated that despite the 34-minute running-time of this film, the restoration required enough digital storage to hold several feature-length films.

== See also ==
- Jack Lord filmography
- List of films about the American Revolution
- List of television series and miniseries about the American Revolution
