= Incident at a Corner =

Incident at a Corner is an episode of the American television anthology series Startime directed by Alfred Hitchcock that aired on April 5, 1960.

== Synopsis ==
Synopsis extracted from The Hitchcock Zone wiki.

Vera Miles plays the daughter of a man accused of an unspeakable act. Hitchcock tells a powerful story of the devastating effects of gossip in a small town. Through his most elaborate and ambitious work for television, Hitchcock sensitively shows the cancerous effects, the pain and tension arising from false accusation.

== Cast ==
All credits extracted from The Hitchcock Zone wiki.

- George Peppard as Pat Lawrence
- Vera Miles as Jean Medwick
- Paul Hartman as James Medwick
- Eve McVeagh as Georgia
- Jack Albertson as Harry
- Leora Dana as Mrs. Tawley
- Warren Berlinger as Ron Tawley
- Leslie Barrett as Batle
