= Crisis in Mid-Air =

- DVD cover
- Genre: Drama
- Written by: Sean Baine; Stephen Downing
- Directed by: Walter Grauman
- Starring: George Peppard; Karen Grassle; Desi Arnaz Jr.; Michael Constantine; Fabian; Martin Milner; Greg Morris; Don Murray
- Music by: Robert Drasnin
- Country of origin: United States
- Original language: English

Production
- Producer: Roger Lewis
- Cinematography: John M. Nickolaus Jr.
- Editor: Anthony DiMarco
- Running time: 100 min.
- Production company: CBS Entertainment Production

Original release
- Network: CBS
- Release: February 13, 1979

Crisis in Mid-air is a 1979 US made for TV movie. Unlike other airport disaster films popular in the 1970s, it concentrates on the stresses at Air Traffic Control. Crisis in Mid-air was shot partially on location at the Los Angeles International Airport (LAX) Terminal Area/Approach Radar Control (TRACON) Center.

== Plot ==
Air Traffic Controller Nick Culver (George Peppard) has been suffering recurring nightmares where a military pilot is intentionally switching off his transponder signal. He subsequently intrudes into the airspace of civilian flights Nick is controlling, causing an air collision. He wakes up terrified and his wife Betsy (Karen Grassle) advises him to see a doctor, and to find a less stressful job.

Nick, in his late 50s, working as an LAX Air Traffic Controller, feels trapped in his job. The stress is affecting his mental and physical health. He is driven to prove himself despite his years. His nightmare turns real as he experiences an accident similar to his dream. After the incident, the civilian flight passengers are all dead, and the military pilot has bailed out and survived. During the inquiry, the pilot lies about his actions. As a final hearing approaches, Nick's career is in danger. He smokes and drinks coffee incessantly, and begins to take pills to calm his nerves.

There follows a confrontation with Brian Haley (Greg Morris), the employee the authorities have used to try to frame Nick by blaming the accident on his mistake. Nick replies that the employee is a bitter "washed-out" pilot who seeks revenge on the aviation industry.

Nick's stress continues at work. After working in Chicago, Tim Donovan (Desi Arnaz, Jr.), a young controller, is posted to LAX with Nick becoming his instructor. The two generations strongly clash with each other. The young controller is more relaxed and not conscious of the particular difficulties he may face while the older and experienced instructor knows that any moment can produce a situation that pushes adrenaline to its highest. When Maggie Johnson (Margie Impert), a young trainee panics, she realizes that she cannot handle the stress.

The climax of Nick's stress comes with the arrival of the psychologist Dr. Eric Denvers (Martin Milner). Frank Piovano (Michael Constantine) as the head of the Civil Aviation Authority in Los Angeles had sent for the psychologist. Brad Mullins (Dana Elcar), as the head of the controllers, wants to closely watch the controllers as some of them are reported to have problems and there is fear for consequences in air safety. The presence of Dr. Denvers increases the stress as everyone knows that if detected to be mentally unstable, the controller will lose his job.

Nick explains all the tricks of the trade to the psychologist including why even rules have to bend to allow traffic to keep on going instead of queuing for long periods on the ground. He also informs Dr. Denvers that controllers' personal life should not be under review. In Donovan's training, his actions nearly cause a collision that is averted at the last minute by Nick taking control. Even in this stressful situation, he corrects automatically while his face reflects his tremendous anxiety. At Nick's hearing, his accumulated anxiety results in a family breakup with Betsy leaving him.

At LAX, Piovano not only has his controllers to worry about but a series of murders of taxicab drivers that work out of LAX, is extremely troubling. Billy Coleman (Fabian), an airport worker at LAX, who has lost his mind after a cab driver killed his child, is the killer. While trying to escape from the police, he rams a bus into the radar installations, destroying the airport's radar.

Using only their memory and information on paper strips alone, the controllers in the operations room will have to continue without radar. At this crucial moment, Nick works together with Donovan to successfully handle incoming flights. Nick is then informed that Betsy is on a flight already in the air, but that an engine failure has crippled the airliner forcing an immediate landing. In the chaos, Nick trusts Donovan to take charge while he rushes to the airfield to provide help. The bus with the crazed airport worker blocks the runway but Nick joins Piovano to get on the bus to disarm Coleman, and with the disabled airliner in landing approach, he drives the bus away, clearing the runway, as Flight 802 misses it by inches.

After escaping the danger, Betsy returns to Nick's arms and at this moment Haley comes and tells Nick that after a witness came forward who saw the military jet doing aerobatics, Nick is "off the hook". Turning to Betsy, Nick promises to quit his post and return to a normal life.

== Cast ==
- George Peppard as Air Traffic Controller Nick Culver
- Karen Grassle as Betsy Culver, Nick's wife
- Desi Arnaz Jr. as Tim Donovan
- Dana Elcar as Brad Mullins
- Martin Milner as Dr. Eric Denvers
- Fabian as Billy Coleman
- Michael Constantine as Frank Piovano
- Greg Morris as Brian Haley
- Alan Fudge as Bret "Scotty" Loebner
- Denise DuBarry as Jenny Sterling (Credited as Denise Du Berry)
- Don Murray as Adam Travis
- Margie Impert as Maggie Johnson (credited as Margaret Impert) (Note: As part of the joke opening acting and crew credits, Billy Idol is credited as the "wacko-baggage handler" while "Snake Pliskin" is listed as a director and Mark Trent shares star billing with Peppard.).

== Production ==
The film was based on an original script by experienced television writer Sean Blaine. George Peppard says he agreed to play the role a week before the crash of a PSA plane in San Diego. Peppard says the airlines "made things as difficult for us as possible".

Filming started 22 September 1978. Locations included Los Angeles International Airport, Mojave Airport, Maria Habor apartments and CBS Studio Center. Post accident an airline contracted to help the film only agreed to keep helping if any reference to their airline was removed and scenes at LAX were shot between 1am and 6am. The Department of Airports allowed some filming to be done at LAX but the bulk of airport scenes was filmed at Mojave Airport. Producer Roger Lewis had to charter a plane used by rock bands as the 707.

Despite a number of films that have shown the inside of Air Traffic Control work, when most of the others involve fictitious scenes of very often implausible and highly inaccurate content, Crisis in Mid-air is the most authentic ever in its realism and accuracy. For a month, to realistically portray the stresses of their work, Peppard had followed the shifts at LA TRACON. LAX by the late 1960s was one of busiest airports in North America.

The air traffic scenes at LAX are very impressive and well shot. The call sign of the air carrier used in the scenario for the flight GL802, although real on the radar screen, corresponds to a fictitious one, called "Globol" in the film.

Fabian has one of his later film roles. Producer Roger Lewis said he was "pleasantly surprised" by Fabian's performance.

It was one of a number of television films Peppard starred in this decade.

=== Aircraft in the film ===
The types of aircraft include many of those flying in the 1970s with quite a variety of airlines that use LAX until today. These civil types include: Boeing 727-22 c/n 18310/48, N7078U, McDonnell Douglas DC-10-10F c/n 46608/25, N1808U, British Aerospace 125-600A. c/n 256001, N711AG, Boeing 720-022 c/n 18077/265, N7224U, Beechcraft D35 Bonanza and Piper PA-28 Cherokee 235 Pathfinder. One military type also figures prominently, the North American F-100 Super Sabre.

== Reception ==
Crisis in Mid-air was the 57th most popular program of the week it aired.
