= George Peppard =

American actor (1928–1994)

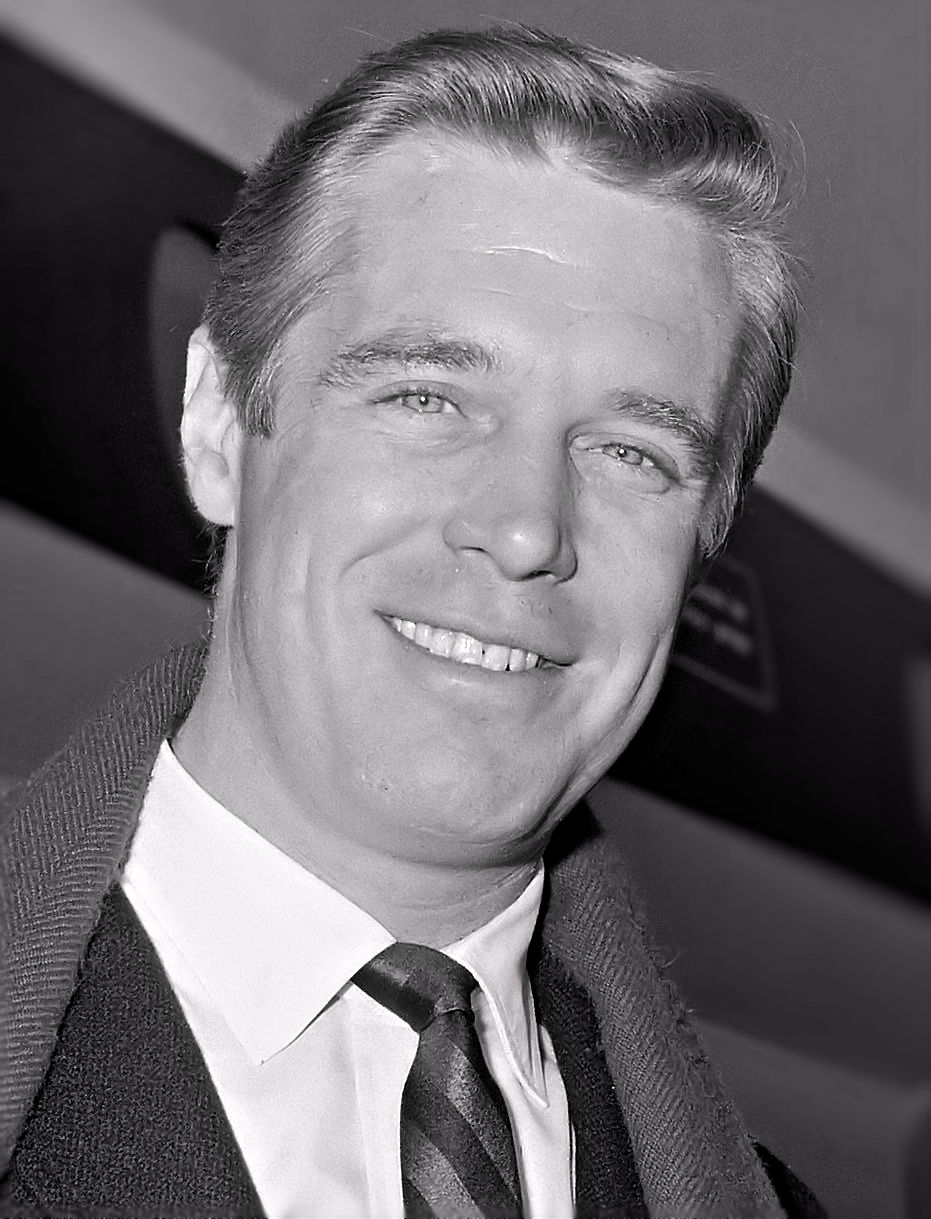
- Peppard in 1964
- Born: October 1, 1928; Detroit, Michigan, U.S.
- Died: May 8, 1994 (aged 65); Los Angeles, California, U.S.
- Education: Carnegie Mellon University (BFA)
- Occupation: Actor
- Years active: 1951–1994
- Spouses: Helen Davies (m. 1954; div. 1964); Elizabeth Ashley (m. 1966; div. 1972); Sherry Boucher (m. 1975; div. 1979); Alexis Adams (m. 1984; div. 1986); Kim Dalton (m. 1987; div. 1994)
- Children: 3

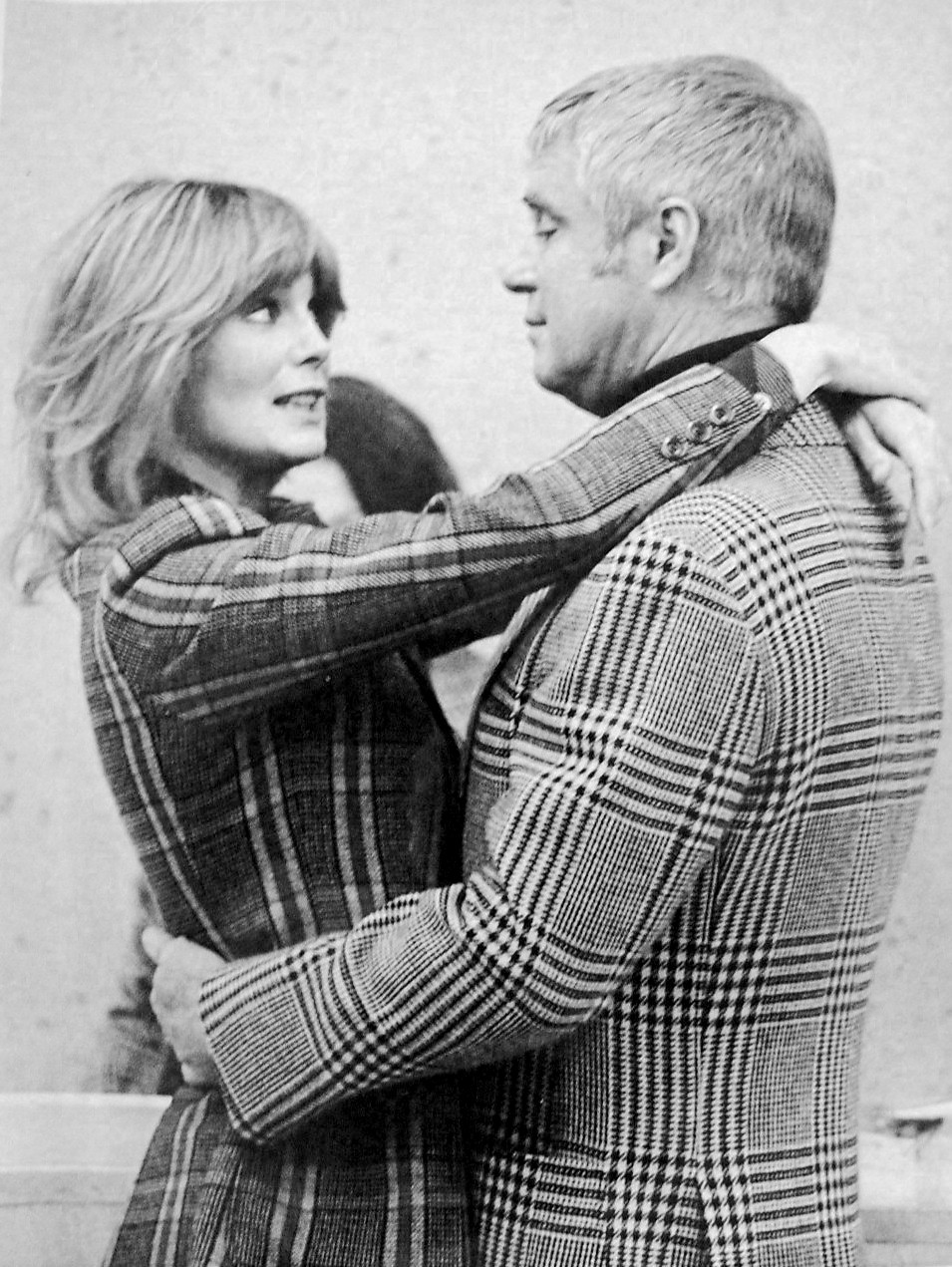
Linda Evans and Peppard in TV's Banacek (1974)

George Peppard (October 1, 1928 – May 8, 1994) was an American actor. He secured a major role as struggling writer Paul Varjak when he starred alongside Audrey Hepburn in Breakfast at Tiffany's (1961), and later portrayed a character based on Howard Hughes in The Carpetbaggers (1964). On television, he played the title role of millionaire insurance investigator and sleuth Thomas Banacek in the early-1970s mystery series Banacek. He played Col. John "Hannibal" Smith, the cigar-smoking leader of a renegade commando squad in the 1980s action television series The A-Team.

== Early life ==
George Peppard Jr. was born October 1, 1928, in Detroit, the son of building contractor George Peppard Sr and music voice teacher Vernelle Rohrer Peppard. His mother had five miscarriages before giving birth to George. His family lost all their money in the Depression, and his father had to leave George and his mother in Detroit while he went looking for work. Peppard grew up in the Detroit suburb of Dearborn, Michigan. He graduated from Dearborn High School in 1946.

Peppard enlisted in the United States Marine Corps on July 8, 1946, and rose to the rank of corporal, leaving the Corps at the end of his enlistment in January 1948.

During 1948 and 1949, he studied civil engineering at Purdue University where he was a member of the Purdue Playmakers theatre troupe and Beta Theta Pi fraternity. He became interested in acting, being an admirer of Walter Huston in particular. "I just decided I didn't want to be an engineer," he said later. "It was the best decision I ever made."

Peppard then transferred to Carnegie Institute of Technology (now Carnegie Mellon University) in Pittsburgh, where he earned his bachelor's degree in 1955. (It took longer than normal because he dropped out for a year when his father died in 1951 and he had to finish his father's jobs.) He also trained at the Pittsburgh Playhouse. While living in Pittsburgh, Peppard worked as a radio DJ at WLOA in Braddock, Pennsylvania. While giving a weather update, he famously called incoming snow flurries "flow snurries". This was an anecdote he repeated in several later interviews, including one with former NFL player Rocky Bleier for WPXI.

In addition to acting, Peppard was a pilot. He spent a portion of his 1966 honeymoon training to fly his Learjet in Wichita, Kansas.

== Career ==
=== Theatre ===
Peppard made his stage debut in 1949 at the Pittsburgh Playhouse. After moving to New York City, Peppard enrolled in the Actors Studio, where he studied the Method with Lee Strasberg. He did a variety of jobs to pay his way during this time, such as working as a disc jockey, being a radio station engineer, teaching fencing, driving a taxi and being a mechanic in a motorcycle repair shop.

He worked in summer stock in New England and appeared at the open air Oregon Shakespeare Festival in Ashland, Oregon for two seasons.

In August 1955, he appeared in the play The Sun Dial.

=== Early television appearances and transition to film ===
He worked as a cab driver until getting his first part in Lamp Unto My Feet. He appeared with Paul Newman, in The United States Steel Hour (1956), as the singing, guitar-playing baseball player Piney Woods in Bang the Drum Slowly, directed by Daniel Petrie.

He appeared in an episode of Kraft Theatre, "Flying Object at Three O'Clock High" (1956).

In March 1956, Peppard was on stage, off Broadway, in Beautiful Changes.

In April 1956, he appeared in a segment of an episode of "Cameras Three" performing from The Shoemaker's Holiday; The New York Times called his performance "beguiling".

In July 1956, he signed to make his film debut in The Strange One directed by Jack Garfein, based on the play End as a Man. It was the first film from Garfein as director and Calder Willingham as producer, plus for Peppard, Ben Gazzara, Geoffrey Horne, Pat Hingle, Arthur Storch and Clifton James. Filming took place in Florida. "I wouldn't say I was nervous," said Peppard, "just excited."

On his return to New York, he performed in "Out to Kill" on TV for Kraft. In September he joined the cast of Girls of Summer directed by Jack Garfein with Shelley Winters, Storch and Hingle, plus a title song by Stephen Sondheim. This reached Broadway in November. Brooks Atkinson said Peppard "expertly plays a sly, malicious dance teacher." It had only a short run.

The bulk of his work around this time was for television: The Kaiser Aluminum Hour ("A Real Fine Cutting Edge", directed by George Roy Hill), Studio One in Hollywood ("A Walk in the Forest"), The Alcoa Hour ("The Big Build-Up" with E. G. Marshall), Matinee Theatre ("End of the Rope" with John Drew Barrymore, "Thread That Runs So True", "Aftermath"), Kraft Theatre ("The Long Flight"), Alfred Hitchcock Presents ("The Diplomatic Corpse", with Peter Lorre directed by Paul Henreid), and Suspicion ("The Eye of Truth" with Joseph Cotten based on a script by Eric Ambler). The Strange One came out in April 1957 but despite some strong reviews – The New York Times called Peppard "resolute". – it was not a financial success.

In September 1957, he appeared in a trial run of a play by Robert Thom, The Minotaur, directed by Sidney Lumet.

Peppard played a key role in Little Moon of Alban (1958) alongside Christopher Plummer for the Hallmark Hall of Fame. The Los Angeles Times called him "excellent".

In May 1958, Peppard played his second film role, a support part in the Korean War movie Pork Chop Hill (1959) directed by Lewis Milestone. He was cast in part because he was unfamiliar to moviegoers.

In May 1958, he appeared in stock in A Swim in the Sea.

In October 1958, Peppard appeared on Broadway in The Pleasure of His Company (1958) starring Cyril Ritchard, who also directed. Peppard played the boyfriend who wants to marry Dolores Hart who was Ritchard's daughter; The New York Times called Peppard "admirable". The play was a hit and ran for a year.

During the show's run, Peppard auditioned successfully for MGM's Home from the Hill (1960) and the studio signed him to a long-term contract – which he had not wanted to do but was a condition for the film. In February 1959, Hedda Hopper announced Peppard would leave Company to make two films for MGM: Home from the Hill and The Subterraneans.

Home from the Hill was a prestigious film directed by Vincente Minnelli and starring Robert Mitchum, who played Peppard's father. It featured several young actors MGM were hoping to develop, including Peppard, George Hamilton, and Luana Patten. During filming, Peppard said "Brando is a dead talent – I saw him in The Young Lions" – but said Peck is "a man of integrity as a star and a person. Lee Strasberg is the only person I know who is brilliant."

"I want to be an actor and proud of my craft", said Peppard. "I would like to be an actor who is starred but being a star is something you can't count on whereas acting is something I can work on." It was a success at the box office, although the film's high cost meant that it was not profitable.

Peppard's next film for MGM was The Subterraneans, an adaptation of the 1958 novel by Jack Kerouac co starring Leslie Caron. It flopped and Peppard said "I couldn't get arrested" afterwards.

He had meant to follow The Subterraneans by returning to Broadway with Julie Harris in The Warm Peninsular but this did not happen. In April 1959 Hedda Hopper said he would be in Chatauqua but that was not made until a decade later, starring Elvis Presley, as The Trouble with Girls (1969). At the end of 1959 Hopper predicted Peppard would be a big star saying "he has great emotional power, is a fine athlete, and does offbeat characters such as James Dean excelled in." Sol Siegel announced he would play the lead in Two Weeks in Another Town. (Kirk Douglas ended up playing it.) He was also announced for the role of Arthur Blake in a film about the first Olympics called And Seven from America which was never made.

Peppard returned to television to star in an episode of the anthology series Startime, "Incident at a Corner" (1960) under the direction of Alfred Hitchcock alongside Vera Miles.

He played Teddy Roosevelt on television in an episode of Our American Heritage, "The Invincible Teddy" (1961).

=== Stardom ===
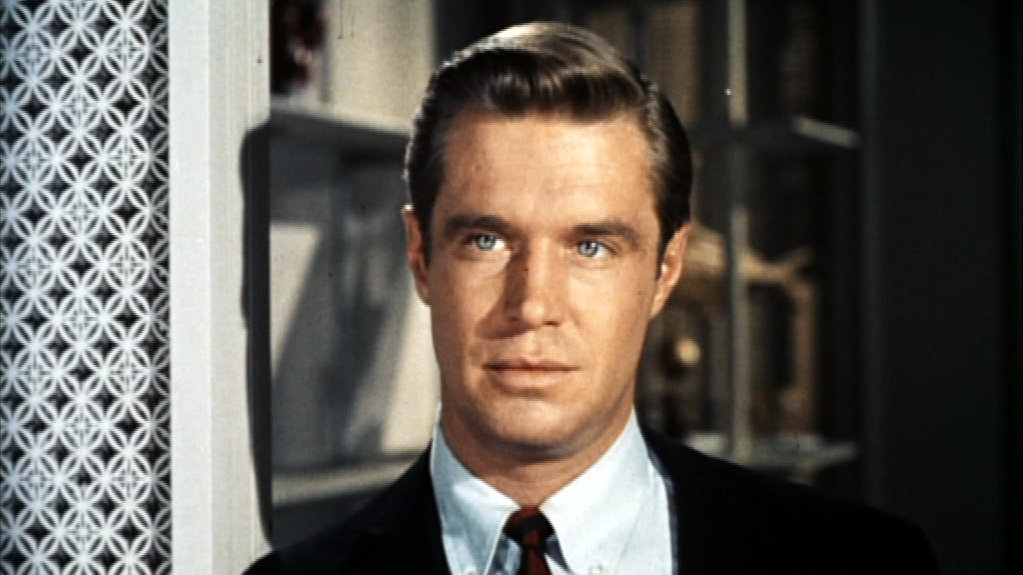
Peppard in Breakfast at Tiffany's (1961)

His good looks, elegant manner and acting skills landed Peppard his most famous film role as Paul Varjak in Breakfast at Tiffany's with Audrey Hepburn, based on the novella of the same name by Truman Capote. Director Blake Edwards had not wanted Peppard, but was overruled by the producers. He was cast in July 1960. During filming Peppard did not get along with Hepburn or Patricia Neal, the latter calling him "cold and conceited".

In November 1961, a newspaper article dubbed him "the next big thing". Peppard said he had turned down two TV series and was "concentrating on big screen roles." His contract with MGM was for two pictures a year, allowing for one outside film and six TV appearances a year, plus the right to star in a play every second year. "In a series you don't have time to develop a character," he said. "There's no build up; in the first segment you're already established."

He was meant to appear in Unarmed in Paradise which was not made. He bought a script by Robert Blees called Baby Talk but it was also unmade.

Instead, MGM cast him in the lead of their epic western How the West Was Won in 1962.(His character spanned three sections of the episodic Cinerama extravaganza.) It was a massive hit.

He followed this with a war story for Carl Foreman, The Victors (1963), made in Europe. He was offered $200,000 to appear in The Long Ships but did not want to go to Yugoslavia for six months. He was going to do Next Time We Love with Ross Hunter but it was never made.

He starred in The Carpetbaggers, a 150-minute saga of a ruthless, Howard Hughes-like aviation and film mogul based on the best-selling novel of the same name by Harold Robbins. The cast included Elizabeth Ashley, who had an affair with Peppard during filming and later married him. She described him as "some kind of Nordic god – six feet tall with beautiful blond hair, blue eyes and a body out of every high school cheerleader's teenage lust fantasy." Ashley claimed Peppard "was never late on set and he had nothing but scorn for actors who weren't professional enough to keep that together."

She added that Peppard:

Never was one of those actors who believes his job is to take the money, hit the mark and say the lines and let it go at that. He felt that as an above-the-title star he had the responsibility to use his muscle and power to try and make it better and that has never stopped in him. He was unrelenting about it, to the point where a lot of executives and directors came to feel he was a pain in the ass. But the really talented people loved working with him because of all his wonderful creative energy.

"My performances bore me", said Peppard in a 1964 interview, adding that his ambition was to deliver "one great performance. And I must say I feel a little presumptuous to shoot for that. But that's the goal, like a hockey goal. I figure I've got a choice ... not of the outcome but of the objective. And my objective is that one performance."

Peppard returned to television to do Bob Hope Presents the Chrysler Theatre, "The Game with Glass Pieces". In March 1964 he tried to break his MGM contract to make The Great Adventure for Anthony Mann.

For MGM, he appeared in Operation Crossbow (1965), a war film with Sophia Loren. It was the first film he made under a new contract with MGM to do one movie a year for three years.

He was meant to follow this with an adaptation of the play Merrily We Roll Along but it was never made.

"I'm an actor not a star," he said around this time, adding that he looked for "three things" in a film, "a good director, a good part and a good script. If I get two out of three of those I'm satisfied."

Peppard starred in a thriller, The Third Day (1965) with Ashley who had become his second wife. The film was directed by Jack Smight who claimed Warner Bros only agreed to finance it because they had a deal with Peppard. Peppard said when he made the film "I wasn't just broke I was up to my ears in debt."

He was announced for The Last Night of Don Juan for Michael Gordon but it was not made. He was cast as the lead in Sands of the Kalahari (1965) at a fee of $200,000 but walked off the set after only a few days of filming in March 1965 and had to be replaced by Stuart Whitman. Paramount sued Peppard for $930,555 in damages and he countersued.

Ashley later wrote:

What tormented George so badly was that he was caught between being an actor and a movie star. He did not start off as an untalented pretty nothing who had to be grateful for any piece of meat that was thrown his way. He was intelligent and talented but because he was six foot tall with blond hair and blue eyes he had been put in the slot of being a movie star at a time when the movie studios were still very powerful and expected you to play the game by their rules ... I don't think it was possible to be a male movie star who looked like he did and got hot when he did and not be trapped by it.

He had a huge hit with The Blue Max (1966), playing a German World War One ace, alongside James Mason and Ursula Andress, directed by John Guillermin.

Film critic David Shipman writes of this stage in his career:

"With his cool, blond baby-face looks and a touch of menace, of meanness, he had established a screen persona as strong as any of the time. He might have been the Alan Ladd or the Richard Widmark of the sixties: but the sixties didn't want a new Alan Ladd. Peppard began appearing in a series of action movies, predictably as a tough guy, but there were much tougher guys around — like Cagney, Bogart and Robinson, whose films had now become television staples."

Peppard played a German Jew fighting for the Allies in Tobruk (1967) alongside Rock Hudson. "It's a big mistake to think I'm making a lot of money and turning out a lot of crap," he said in a 1966 interview.

=== Decline ===
Seeking to ensure his financial security, Peppard bought a cattle ranch. The funding required by this venture prompted Peppard to sign a multi-million-dollar, five-picture contract with Universal in August 1966 – two films for the first year, then one each in the following three. Ashley claimed this ultimately hurt Peppard's career.

The first two films under the contract were Rough Night in Jericho (1967), a Western with Dean Martin, and What's So Bad About Feeling Good? (1968), a comedy directed by George Seaton with Mary Tyler Moore; these were followed by a detective film directed by Guillermin, P.J. (1968), and House of Cards (1968), a thriller directed by Guillermin and shot in Europe. None of these films was particularly successful at the box office. Ashley says that doing these films caused Peppard to start drinking. She also claimed Peppard turned down The Heart Is a Lonely Hunter because he did not want to play a weak or possibly homosexual character.

In 1967, he bought the script Midnight Fair by Sheridan Greenway, to produce. In 1968, he announced that he had co-written a script, Watch Them Die, which he planned to direct, but not play a starring role in. It was never made. Neither was a version of The Most Dangerous Game for MGM, announced in 1967.

Peppard starred in the crime drama Pendulum (1969), directed by George Schaefer with Jean Seberg, and traveled to England to star in The Executioner (1970) opposite Joan Collins. In Cannon for Cordoba (1970), Peppard played the steely Captain Rod Douglas, who has been put in charge of gathering a group of soldiers on a dangerous mission into Mexico. His fees for these were $400,000 plus a percentage. He was scheduled to make The Plot at Fox but this does not seem to have been made.

Peppard instead was in One More Train to Rob (1971), another Western, at Universal. Ashley wrote "he became more and more frustrated and disillusioned from hating the kind of pictures he had to do. There were no good scripts, no good directors and at some point it became icily clear that there weren't going to be any."

In September 1970, he toured Vietnam with a USO show.

=== Return to TV ===
In March 1971, Peppard announced that his company, Tradewind Productions, had optioned a novel by Stanley Ellin, The Eighth Circle, but it was not made.

Peppard starred in a Western TV movie The Bravos (1972) with Pernell Roberts. He returned to features with The Groundstar Conspiracy (1972) co-starring Michael Sarrazin, shot in Canada for Universal; Peppard's fee was $400,000.

In August 1971, Peppard signed to star in Banacek (1972–1974), part of The NBC Mystery Movie series, starring in 90-minute whodunits as a wealthy Boston playboy who solves thefts for insurance companies for a finder's fee. Sixteen regular episodes were produced over two seasons. Peppard also did some second unit directing. "Ever since The Carpetbaggers I've played the iron-jawed cold-eyed killer and that gets to be a goddamned bore," he said in 1972. "Acting is not the most creative thing in the world and when you play a man of action it gets to be a long day. Banacek is the best character I've played in a long time."

In February 1972, Peppard stood trial in Boston, accused of attempting to rape a stripper in his hotel room. He was cleared of the charges. The same year, he and Ashley were divorced, with Peppard to pay her $2,000 per month alimony plus $350 per month child support for their son Christian.

Peppard starred in Newman's Law (1974), an action film originally called Newman. When Banacek ended Peppard wanted to take time off to focus on producing and directing, including a project called The Total Beast. However alimony and child support obligations forced him back to acting. He made some TV movies One of Our Own (1975), a medical drama, and Guilty or Innocent: The Sam Sheppard Murder Case (1975), as Sam Sheppard, for which his fee was $100,000. One of Our Own had been a pilot for a TV series which was picked up – Doctors' Hospital (1975) lasted 15 episodes.

Peppard starred in the science-fiction film Damnation Alley (1977), which has gone on to attain a substantial cult following in the years since. Peppard's role in the film was reportedly turned down by Steve McQueen because of salary issues. The movie cost $8.5 million. Peppard said Jack Smight's original director's cut was "wonderful" but claimed many of the key scenes in the film were cut when it was re-edited by executives.

With fewer interesting roles coming his way, he acted in, directed and produced the drama Five Days from Home in 1979.

=== Five Days from Home ===
Peppard later said the low point of his career came over a three-year period around the time of Five Days from Home. "It was a bad time", he said in 1983. "I was heavily in debt. My career seemed to be going nowhere. Not much work over a three-year period. Every morning I'd wake up and realize I was getting deeper and deeper into debt".

He had to sell his car and take out a second mortgage on his home to finance Five Days from Home. Eventually, he got his money back and was able to concentrate on his career."I'm quite proud of it", he said in 1979. "I sold many assets to help make it but I don't mind. It was the best time of my life."

He had the lead in the TV movies Crisis in Mid-air (1979) and Torn Between Two Lovers (1979) and went to Europe for From Hell to Victory (1979).

In a rare game show appearance, Peppard did a week of shows on Password Plus in 1979, in which he could often be seen smoking cigarettes while filming. Out of five shows, the first was never broadcast on NBC, but aired much later on GSN and Buzzr, because of on-camera comments made by Peppard regarding personal dissatisfaction he felt related to his treatment by the NBC officials who supervised the production of Password Plus. As a result of this, Goodson-Todman banned Peppard from appearing on any of their game shows ever again for that incident, resulting in significant costs due to needing to film an extra episode two weeks later to make up for the pulled episode.

In April 1979, Peppard said "I want to act again – and I need a good role. The Sam Shepherd story I did for TV was the only good role I've had in the last seven to ten years." He added he was developing two movies and a TV drama series plus an educational series.

=== Dynasty ===
In 1980, Peppard was offered, and accepted, the role of Blake Carrington in the television series Dynasty. During the filming of the pilot episode, which also featured Linda Evans and Bo Hopkins, Peppard repeatedly clashed with the show's producers, Richard and Esther Shapiro; among other things, he felt that his role was too similar to that of J. R. Ewing in the series Dallas. Three weeks later, before filming of additional episodes was set to begin, Peppard was fired and the part was offered to John Forsythe; the scenes with Peppard were re-shot and Forsythe became the permanent star of the show. Joan Collins says she was pleased he didn't get the role as she "hated him" following an alleged sexual assault incident.

"It was a big blow," Peppard noted subsequently, adding he felt Forsythe ultimately did "a better job (as Blake Carrington) than I could have done." Ironically, this led to his being available to be cast in NBC's The A-Team, the number one rated television show in its first season in 1982.

"I'm so glad I wasn't drinking", he said later, having stopped in 1979. "I bet a lot of people thought when I did certain things, I had been drinking and now they found out it wasn't the booze at all. It was me."

During that same period, Peppard also had a role as a cowboy in the science fiction film Battle Beyond the Stars (1980). He travelled to Canada to make Your Ticket Is No Longer Valid (1981) with Richard Harris, to New Zealand for Race for the Yankee Zephyr (1982) and Spain for Hit Man (1982).

"I almost disappeared for awhile, between ages 45 and 55", he later reflected. "Nobody wants to work with someone who quits three series. They think you're insane to quit a series with all the millions of dollars to be made there. It gets to be like crossing the mob. You find out some people you thought were your friends aren't really."

=== The A-Team ===
In 1982, Peppard auditioned for and won the role of Colonel John "Hannibal" Smith in the television action adventure series The A-Team, acting alongside Mr. T, Dirk Benedict and Dwight Schultz. In the series, the A-Team was a team of renegade commandos on the run from the military for "a crime they did not commit" while serving in the Vietnam War. The A-Team members made their collective living as soldiers of fortune, but they helped only people who came to them with justified grievances.

As "Hannibal" Smith, Peppard played the leader of the A-Team, distinguished by his cigar smoking, confident smirk, black leather gloves, disguises, and distinctive catchphrase, "I love it when a plan comes together." Peppard was attracted to the role partly because Smith was a master of disguise enabling Peppard to play a variety of characters. "I love the character of Hannibal," he said. "It inspires my fantasy. And, frankly, I need the money."

"I wanted to change from leading man to character actor for years now but have never been given the chance before", he added.

The show started filming in late 1982 and premiered in January 1983. It was an instant ratings success, going straight into the top ten most watched shows in the country. The series, which ran for five seasons on NBC from 1983 to 1987, made Peppard known to a new generation and is arguably his best-known role. His fee was reportedly $50,000 an episode. This went up to $65,000, making him one of the best paid stars on television.

Peppard said "the first year of the show "it was kind of like Monty Python – absolutely ridiculous. It was fresh, it was fun, it was silly – building an airplane out of a lawn-mower engine – fun stuff done very straight." After that, though "it became very boring to me and not very good."

The role was reportedly written originally with James Coburn in mind, but Coburn declined, and thus it went to Peppard. It was reported that Peppard was annoyed by Mr. T upstaging him in his public image, and at one point in their relationship, refused to speak directly to Mr. T. Instead, he sent messages through intermediaries (including at times fellow cast members, particularly Dirk Benedict), and for this, Peppard was occasionally portrayed by the press as not a team player. Melinda Culea claimed it was Peppard who got her fired after the first season.

"It's the first time I ever had money in the bank", Peppard said later. "Four California divorces and 25 years of alimony will see to it you have no money in the bank. It was a giant boost to my career, and made me a viable actor for other roles."

During the series' run Peppard guest starred on the Tales of the Unexpected episode "The Dirty Detail" (1983).

=== Later career ===
Peppard's last series was intended to be several television movie features entitled Man Against the Mob (1988) and set in the 1940s. In these TV detective films, Peppard played Los Angeles Police Detective Sgt. Frank Doakey. The second film Man Against the Mob: The Chinatown Murders was broadcast in December 1989. A third film in this series was planned, but Peppard died before it was filmed.

In his later years, Peppard appeared in several stage productions. In 1988, he portrayed Ernest Hemingway in the play PAPA, which played a number of cities including Boise, Idaho; Atlanta, Georgia; and San Francisco. Peppard financed it, and played in it. In 1988, he said, "Once I saw this thing, I knew that if I was going to do it, I'd have to stick with it. I've got a couple bucks in the bank, so I'm not working on anything else. I got an adrenaline rush when I first read this play – part joy, part fear." Peppard said he understood Hemingway. "We were both married four times; that's one similarity. Up until ten years ago I used to drink a lot, as he did. And then, he had to deal with living the life of a famous person."

The play was well received. Peppard said of his image, "There's a George Peppard out there that I don't know. He's been written about, and various people have interpreted him various ways. There are people who've made up stories, apocryphal, about me. There are people who didn't like me much."

He appeared in Silence Like Glass (1989) and Night of the Fox (1990). In 1989, he said "I'm afraid I'm typecast. It was discouraging when it first happened. I was sad. I had hoped to do lots of different kinds of roles. But fear and insecurity guides casting decisions. Movies and TV have to make money. And people get used to you playing a part and doing certain things. If you don't do it, they get disappointed and it shows up at the box office."

In 1990, he was seeking financing for The Crystal Contract, a film about an international cocaine cartel that he would produce and in which he would star, but it was never made. "I would like to do another series because it would mean steady work – and because I would like one more hit."

In 1992, he toured in The Lion in Winter, in which he played Henry II to Susan Clark's Eleanor of Aquitaine. "I haven't been as happy as I am for a long time," he said. "When you find a part you are right for and you love, it's a source of happiness, believe me... If I could have my wish come true, I'd spend the next two years doing nothing but this play."

His last television role was guest-starring in a 1994 episode of Matlock entitled "The P.I". The episode, co-starring Tracy Nelson, was meant to serve as a backdoor pilot for a series about a father and his estranged daughter both working as private investigators. The episode aired just over two months before Peppard's death.

== Personal life ==
Peppard was married five times and was the father of three children.

- Helen Davies (1954–1964): two children. Ms. Davies never remarried.
- Elizabeth Ashley (1966–1972), his co-star in The Carpetbaggers and The Third Day: one son. In accordance with their 1972 divorce settlement, Peppard paid Ashley $2,000 per month in alimony for four years, and $350 per month in child support for their son. Ashley's two awards were nullified in 1975 when she married James McCarthy, whom she divorced in 1981.
- Sherry Boucher (1975–1979), a realtor from Springhill, Louisiana, who subsequently married John Lytle.
- Alexis Adams (1984–1986), also known as Joyce Ann Furbee, a TV actress.
- Kim Dalton (1987–1994)

In 1990, he said, "Getting married and having a bad divorce is just like breaking your leg. The same leg, in the same place. I'm lucky I don't walk with a cane."

Peppard resided in a Greek revival-style white cottage in Hollywood Hills, California, until the time of his death. His home featured elegant porches on three sides and a guest house in the back. Later owned by designer Brenda Antin, who spent a year renovating it, the small home was purchased by writer/actress Lena Dunham in 2015 for $2.7 million. Dunham sold the property in 2021 for $2.95 million to an undisclosed buyer.

Peppard overcame a serious alcohol problem in 1978, after which he became deeply involved in helping other alcoholics. "I knew I had to stop and I did", he said in 1983. "Looking back now I'm ashamed of some of the things I did when I was drinking." He smoked three packs of cigarettes a day for most of his life, until a diagnosis of lung cancer in 1992 and an operation to remove part of one lung, after which he quit. Despite health problems in his later years, he continued acting. On May 8, 1994, while battling lung cancer, Peppard died from pneumonia in Los Angeles. He was buried in his hometown, Dearborn, Michigan, alongside other family members.

== Critical appraisal ==
David Shipman published this appraisal of Peppard in 1972:

"George Peppard's screen presence has some agreeable anomalies. He is tough, assured and insolent — in a way that recalls late Dick Powell rather than early Bogart; but his bright blue eyes and blond hair, his boyish face suggest the all-American athlete, perhaps going to seed. The sophistication is surface deep: you can imagine him in Times Square on a Saturday night, sulky, defiant, out of his depth, not quite certain how he wants to spend the evening."

In 1990, Peppard said, "An enormous amount of my film work has been spent charging up a hill saying, 'Follow me, men! This way!' Even though I did Breakfast at Tiffany's, nobody seemed to think I could do comedy. I always played the man of action. And men of action are not terribly deep characters, and not real vocal characters."

He added, "I trained for seven years before I started getting screen work as a stage actor. I love working for an audience. Aside from that, despite all the uniforms and the guns, I think I am at my base a character actor... Being a star has never interested me. Stars, per se [sic], are a pain. Stars to me are in the sky. The important question is, 'How good an actor are you?' And now I have some hope, because I'm of an age where I could be considered for character roles."

Shortly before he died, he said, "If you look at my movie list, you'll see some really good movies and then the start of ones that were not so good. But I was making enough money to send my children to good schools, have a house for them and give them a center in their lives."

== Awards ==
- 1960 NBR Award (National Board of Review of Motion Pictures) for Home from the Hill as Best Supporting Actor
- 1961 British Academy Film Award nomination, Category: Most Promising Newcomer To Leading Film Roles for Home From The Hill
- Star on the Hollywood Walk of Fame (Category Motion Pictures, 6675 Hollywood Blvd., Los Angeles)

== Filmography ==
| Year | Title | Role | Notes |
|---|---|---|---|
| 1957 | The Strange One | Cadet Robert Marquales | Film debut |
| 1959 | Pork Chop Hill | Corporal Chuck Fedderson | |
| 1960 | Home from the Hill | Raphael "Rafe" Copley | |
| 1960 | The Subterraneans | Leo Percepied | |
| 1961 | Breakfast at Tiffany's | Paul Varjak | |
| 1962 | How the West Was Won | Zeb Rawlings | |
| 1963 | The Victors | Corporal Frank Chase | |
| 1964 | The Carpetbaggers | Jonas Cord | |
| 1965 | Operation Crossbow | Lieutenant John Curtis | |
| 1965 | The Third Day | Steve Mallory | |
| 1966 | The Blue Max | Lieutenant Bruno Stachel | |
| 1967 | Tobruk | Captain Kurt Bergman | |
| 1967 | Rough Night in Jericho | Dolan | |
| 1968 | P.J. | P.J. Detweiler | |
| 1968 | What's So Bad About Feeling Good? | Pete | |
| 1968 | House of Cards | Reno Davis | |
| 1969 | Pendulum | Captain Frank Matthews | |
| 1970 | The Executioner | John Shay | |
| 1970 | Cannon for Cordoba | Captain Red Douglas | |
| 1971 | One More Train to Rob | Harker Fleet | |
| 1972 | The Groundstar Conspiracy | Tuxan | |
| 1974 | Newman's Law | Vince Newman | |
| 1977 | Damnation Alley | Major Eugene Denton | |
| 1979 | Five Days from Home | T.M. Pryor | also director and producer |
| 1979 | From Hell to Victory | Brett Rosson | |
| 1979 | An Almost Perfect Affair | Himself | Uncredited |
| 1980 | Battle Beyond the Stars | Cowboy | |
| 1981 | Your Ticket Is No Longer Valid | Jim Daley | |
| 1981 | Race for the Yankee Zephyr | Theo Brown | |
| 1982 | Hit Man | McFadden | |
| 1989 | Zwei Frauen | Mr. Martin | |
| 1992 | The Tigress | Sid Slaughter | Final film role |

== Television ==
| Year | Title | Role | Notes |
|---|---|---|---|
| 1956 | The United States Steel Hour | Piney Woods | Episode: Bang the Drum Slowly |
| 1956–1957 | Kraft Television Theatre | Various | Episodes: The Long Flight; Flying Object at Three O'Clock High |
| 1957 | The Kaiser Aluminum Hour | Lynch | Episode: A Real Fine Cutting Edge |
| 1957 | Studio One | | Episode: A Walk in the Forest |
| 1957 | The Alcoa Hour | Eddie Pierce | Episode: The Big Build-Up |
| 1957 | Alfred Hitchcock Presents | Evan Wallace | Episode: The Diplomatic Corpse |
| 1957–1958 | Matinee Theatre | | Episodes: End of the Rope, Part 1 End of the Rope, Part 2 Aftermath |
| 1958 | Suspicion | Lee | Episode: The Eye of Truth |
| 1958 | Hallmark Hall of Fame | Dennis Walsh | Episode: Little Moon of Alban |
| 1960 | Startime | Pat Lawrence | Episode: Incident at a Corner |
| 1964 | Theatre of Stars | Buddy Wren | Episode: The Game with Glass Pieces |
| 1972 | The Bravos | Major John David Harkness | Television Film |
| 1972–1974 | Banacek | Thomas Banacek | |
| 1975 | The Week of Fear | Dr. Jake Goodwin | Television Film |
| 1975 | Guilty or Innocent: The Sam Sheppard Murder Case | Dr. Samuel Sheppard | Television Film |
| 1975–1976 | Doctors' Hospital | Dr. Jake Goodwin | |
| 1979 | Crisis in Mid-Air | Nick Culver | Television Film |
| 1979 | Torn Between Two Lovers | Paul Rasmussen | Television Film |
| 1982 | Twilight Theatre | | Television Film |
| 1983–1987 | The A-Team | Colonel John "Hannibal" Smith | |
| 1984 | Tales of the Unexpected | Sergeant Guedo | Episode: The Dirty Detail |
| 1988 | Man Against the Mob | Frank Doakey | Television Film |
| 1989 | Man Against the Mob: The Chinatown Murders | Frank Doakey | Television Film |
| 1990 | Night of the Fox | Colonel Harry Martineau/Max Vogel | Television Film |
| 1994 | Matlock | Max Morgan | Episode: The P.I. (final appearance) |

== Select theatre credits ==
- Girls of Summer (1956–1957)
- The Pleasure of His Company (1958–1959)
- The Sound of Music (1982)
- Papa (1988)
- The Lion in Winter (1991–1992)
