= Guilty or Innocent: The Sam Sheppard Murder Case =

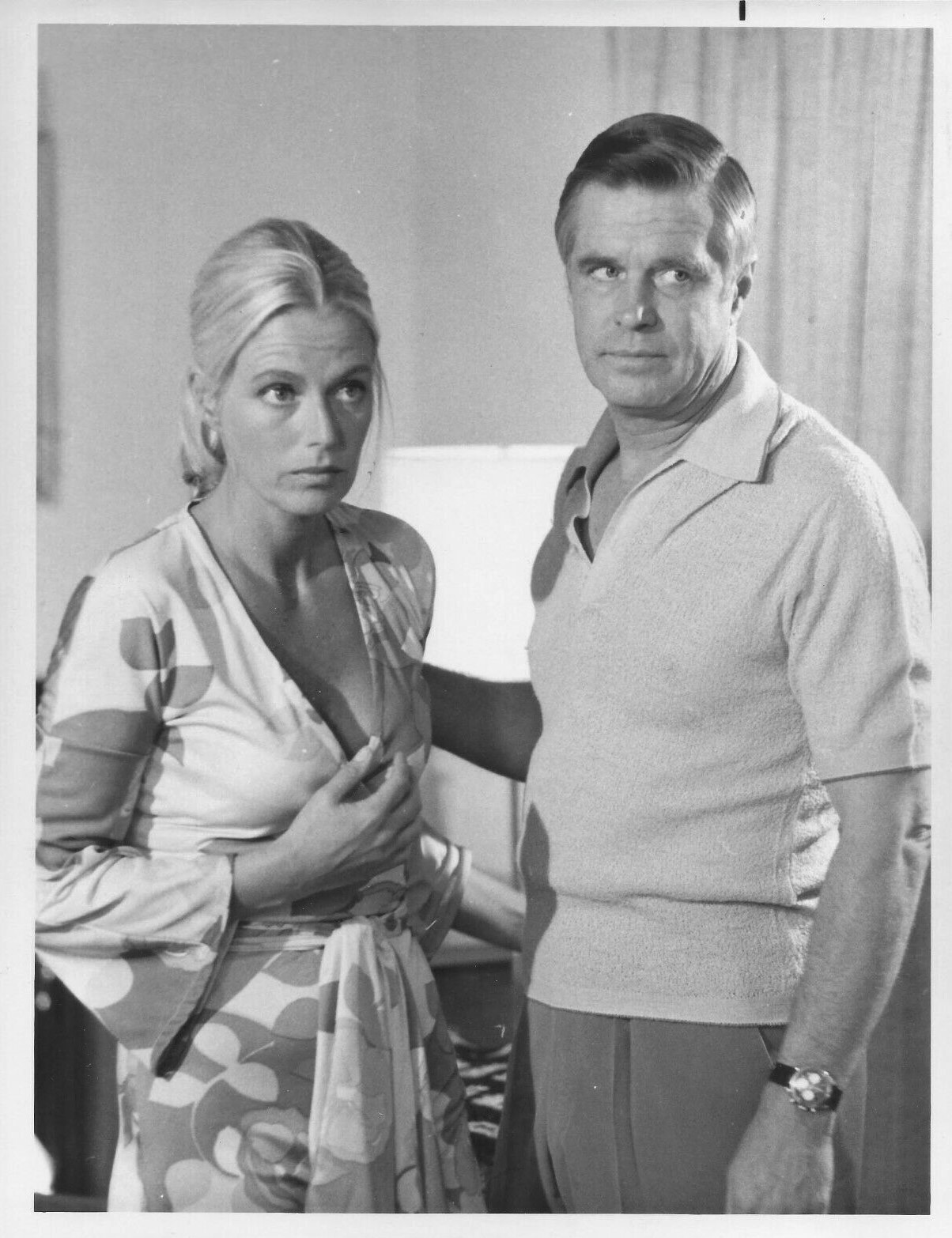
- Nina Van Pallandt and George Peppard
- Genre: Drama
- Written by: Harold Gast; Lou Randolph
- Directed by: Robert Michael Lewis
- Starring: George Peppard; Barnard Hughes; William Windom; Claudette Nevins; Russell Thorson; George Murdock
- Theme music composer: Lalo Schifrin
- Country of origin: United States
- Original language: English

Production
- Executive producer: Harve Bennett
- Producer: Harold Gast
- Cinematography: Stevan Larner
- Editor: Robert F. Shugrue
- Running time: 144 min
- Production companies: Silverton Productions; Universal Television

Original release
- Network: NBC
- Release: November 17, 1975

Guilty or Innocent: The Sam Sheppard Murder Case (1975) is a TV drama film, starring George Peppard and directed by Robert Michael Lewis. It was produced by Harold Gast and Harve Bennett.

== Plot ==
The film traces the story of Sam Sheppard (George Peppard), an Ohio doctor wrongly accused of murdering his wife in 1954. As the film begins, a dying Dr. Sam gasps “I know who killed Marilyn.”

Sheppard is a successful osteopath in Cleveland working at the family clinic. He has an attractive wife Marilyn and a nine-year-old son. His idyllic life comes to an end one July morning when the police are called to his home after he reports an intruder attacked him and murdered his wife.

The case and the ensuing trial get nationwide publicity. Despite an able defense lawyer, Sam is convicted and sentenced to life imprisonment, never ceasing to proclaim his innocence. He is released after ten years through the efforts of his brilliant new young lawyer F. Lee Bailey and given a retrial. Bailey's aggressive defense overwhelms the prosecution and Sheppard is found not guilty at last; however, his life afterwards is not happy.

He remarries soon after getting out of prison but it ends in divorce and he is sued for malpractice after regaining his medical license. Desperate to make a living he becomes a small time professional wrestler. The strain of his never-ending ordeal wears on him and he turns to alcohol. He dies a broken man at 46 of a liver disease.

As the film ends, a narrator notes that the murderer has never been found and that “the rest is mystery.”

== Cast ==
Actor	Role
George Peppard	Dr. Samuel Sheppard
Barnard Hughes	Attorney Philip J. Madden
Walter McGinn	F. Lee Bailey
Claudette Nevins	Marilyn Sheppard
William Windom	Walt Adamson
William Dozier	Dr. Richard Sheppard, Sr.
Jack Knight	Detective Moore
Russell Thorson	Judge Edwards
Paul Fix	Supreme Court Justice
George Murdock	Prosecutor Simons
Nina Van Pallandt	Ilse Brandt

== Reception ==
The New York Times commented that the aspects of the Sam Sheppard murder case were "misinterpreted or botched," and criticized the production for "shabby and sordid sensationalism."
