= Leora Dana =

American actress (1923–1983)

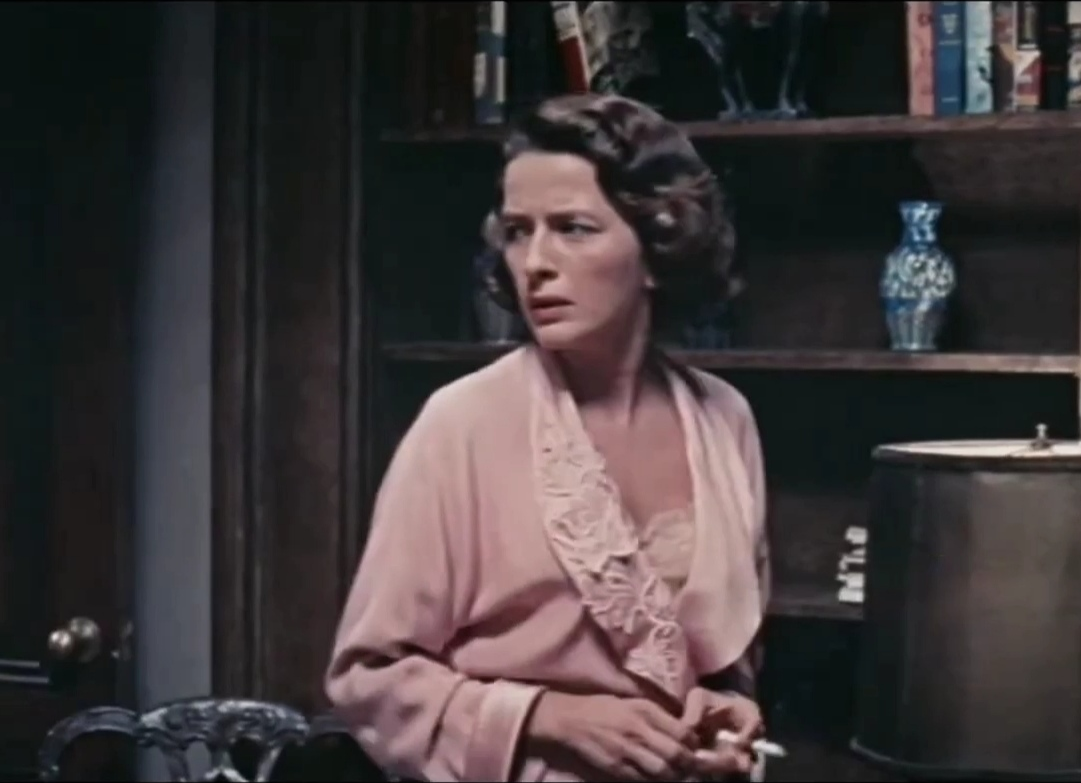
- Dana in the trailer for Some Came Running (1958)
- Born: April 1, 1923; New York City, U.S.
- Died: December 13, 1983 (aged 60); New York City, U.S.
- Occupations: American film, TV and stage actress
- Years active: 1956–1983
- Awards: Tony Award for Best Performance by a Featured Actress in a Play

Leora Dana (April 1, 1923 – December 13, 1983) was an American film, stage and television actress from New York City. Dana appeared in numerous productions across film, television, and theatre, including The Madwoman of Chaillot, Williamsburg: The Story of a Patriot, and The Asphalt Jungle. She won several awards across her career, including the Clarence Derwent Award for Most Promising female. Dana died in 1983.

== Early life ==
Dana was born on April 1, 1923, in New York City; her elder sister was Doris Dana. When Dana was 5 years old, her father abandoned the family. Her mother, who was a nurse, discouraged her plans to be an actress. Dana graduated from Barnard College and the Royal Academy of Dramatic Art. In the summer of 1945, while she was a student at Barnard, she was a theatrical apprentice at the Ogunquit Playhouse in Maine. She was the female lead in the playhouse's production of Dear Brutus.

== Career ==
=== Stage ===
In 1947, Dana made her stage debut in London. In 1948, she debuted on Broadway in The Madwoman of Chaillot. Her other Broadway credits included The Happy Time (1950), Point of No Return (1951), Sabrina Fair (1953), The Best Man (1960), Beekman Place (1964), The Last of Mrs. Lincoln (1972), The Women (1973), and Mourning Pictures (1974).

=== Film ===
After appearing in the 1957 western 3:10 to Yuma, Dana had supporting roles in two 1958 Frank Sinatra films: Kings Go Forth and Some Came Running. Her other film credits included Pollyanna (1960), A Gathering of Eagles (1963), The Group (1966), The Boston Strangler (1968), Change of Habit (1969), Tora! Tora! Tora! (1970), Wild Rovers (1971), Shoot the Moon (1982), Baby It's You (1983), and Amityville 3-D (1983). Dana also played Anne Fry, the wife of the patriot John Fry, played by Jack Lord in the 1957 orientation film Williamsburg: The Story of a Patriot. The film has the distinction of being the longest-running motion picture in history, having been shown continually in the Colonial Williamsburg Visitor Center for over five decades.

=== Television ===
Dana guest-starred in three episodes of the television series Alfred Hitchcock Presents. In 1960, she appeared in episode "Incident at a Corner," which was directed by Alfred Hitchcock. In 1961, Dana appeared in an episode ("The Scott Machine") of the television series The Asphalt Jungle, and later appeared in the 1977 miniseries Seventh Avenue. In 1978–1979, Dana played the role of alcoholic clothing designer Sylvie Kosloff, the biological mother of villainess Iris Cory (Beverlee McKinsey) on Another World. On March 11, 1954, she starred in "Dark Victory" on Kraft Television Theatre.

== Awards ==
In 1949, Dana won the Clarence Derwent Award for Most Promising Female for The Madwoman of Chaillot on Broadway. She won the 1973 Tony Award for Best Performance by a Featured Actress in a Play for The Last of Mrs. Lincoln.

== Personal life and death ==
Dana was married to actor Kurt Kasznar. They were divorced in 1958. She died of cancer, aged 60, on December 13, 1983 in New York City.

== Filmography ==
=== Film ===
Year	Title	Role	Notes
1954	Valley of the Kings	Lovely Girl	uncredited
1957	3:10 to Yuma	Alice Evans	
1957	Williamsburg: The Story of a Patriot	Anne Fry	
1958	Kings Go Forth	Mrs. Blair	
1958	Some Came Running	Agnes Hirsh	
1960	Pollyanna	Mrs. Paul Ford	
1963	A Gathering of Eagles	Evelyn Fowler	
1966	The Group	Mrs. Renfrew	
1968	The Boston Strangler	Mary Bottomly	
1969	Change of Habit	Mother Joseph	
1970	Tora! Tora! Tora!	Mrs. Kramer	
1971	Wild Rovers	Nell Buckman	
1982	Shoot the Moon	Charlotte DeVoe	
1983	Baby It's You	Miss Vernon	
1983	Amityville 3-D	Emma Caswell	
1984	Nothing Lasts Forever	Joyce	released posthumously

=== Television ===
Year	Title	Role	Notes
1950	The Philco Television Playhouse	Emmy Blanchard	Episode: "Nocturne"
1951	The Philco Television Playhouse	Clarice	Episode: "Mr. Arcularis"
1954	The Motorola Television Hour	Thea	Episode: "Black Chiffon"
1955	Studio One	Laura Ford	Episode: "The Incredible World of Horace Ford"
1956	Armstrong Circle Theatre	Ruth	Episode: "Man in Shadow"
1956	Studio One	Margaret Norton	Episode: "The Arena"
1956	Star Tonight	Mrs. Teeling	Episode: "The Chevigny Man"
1956	Telephone Time	Elizabeth Barrett Browning	Episode: "Mr. and Mrs. Browning"
1956	Alfred Hitchcock Presents	Irene Cole	Season 1 Episode 35: "The Legacy"
1956	Alfred Hitchcock Presents	Vera Brown	Season 2 Episode 14: "John Brown's Body"
1956	Kraft Television Theatre	Louise	Episode: "The Sears Girl"
1957	Kraft Television Theatre	Marion Hunter	Episode: "The Medallion"
1957	Climax!	Rose Skinner	Episode: "Tunnel of Fear"
1957	Schlitz Playhouse of Stars	Mrs. Ditwiter	Episode: "The Traveling Corpse"
1958	Suspicion	Sue Carey	Episode: "The Eye of Truth"
1958	Shirley Temple's Storybook	Dame Van Winkle	Episode: "Rip Van Winkle"
1958	The United States Steel Hour	Abby Hill	Episode: "The Bromley Touch"
1959	Alcoa Theatre	Janet Kennedy	Episode: "High Class Type of Mongrel"
1959	The Third Man	Gwen Easterday	Episode: "Death of an Overlord"
1959	Alfred Hitchcock Presents	Naomi Shawn	Season 4 Episode 31: "Your Witness"
1959	Dick Powell's Zane Grey Theatre	Anne Coleman	Episode: "King of the Valley"
1960	Playhouse 90	Eleanor Lambert	Episode: "A Dream of Treason"
1960	Startime	Mrs. Tawley	Episode: "Incident at a Corner"
1961	The Aquanauts	Viviam	Episode: "The Margot Adventure"
1961	The Asphalt Jungle	Doris Scott	Episode: "The Scott Machine"
1961	The Working Mother	Laura Tyler	TV movie
1961	The Defenders	Carol Clark	Episode: "The Treadmill"
1962	Bus Stop	Katherine Benson	Episode: "The Opposite Virtues"
1962	Ben Casey	Mrs. Duncan	Episode: "And Even Death Shall Die"
1963	Stoney Burke	Ellen Mundorf	Episode: "The King of the Hill"
1964	Channing	Fran	Episode: "A Claim to Immortality"
1964	The Lieutenant	Edith Kaine	Episode: "Operation – Actress"
1964	Slattery's People	Mary Sanborn	Episode: "Question: What Is Truth?"
1965	The Nurses	Betty Bauer	Episodes: "Act of Violence" (parts 1 & 2)
1967	Judd, for the Defense	Elizabeth Rossiter	Episode: "Conspiracy"
1969	N.Y.P.D.	Frieda Elliot	Episode: "Everybody Loved Him"
1974	The American Parade	Susan B. Anthony	Episode: "We the Women"
1974	The Dain Curse	Mrs. Huntoon	Miniseries
1976	The Adams Chronicles	Abigail Smith Adams (age 44–74)	Miniseries
1977	Seventh Avenue	Mrs. Gold	Miniseries
1979–80	Another World	Sylvie Kosloff	Recurring role
1980	Nurse	Celia O'Brien	TV movie

== Radio appearances ==
Year	Program	Episode/source
1952	Grand Central Station	Seed of Doubt
