= The Third Day (1965 film) =

1965 film by Jack Smight

- Directed by: Jack Smight
- Screenplay by: Burton Wohl; Robert Presnell, Jr.
- Based on: The Third Day (novel) by Joseph Hayes
- Produced by: Jack Smight
- Starring: George Peppard; Elizabeth Ashley; Roddy McDowall; Arthur O'Connell; Mona Washbourne; Herbert Marshall
- Cinematography: Robert Surtees
- Edited by: Stefan Arnsten
- Music by: Percy Faith
- Production company: Warner Bros. Pictures
- Distributed by: Warner Bros. Pictures
- Release date: August 4, 1965
- Running time: 119 minutes
- Country: United States
- Language: English

The Third Day is a 1965 American suspense thriller film directed by Jack Smight and starring George Peppard and Elizabeth Ashley. It was based on a novel by Joseph Hayes.

== Plot ==
Steve Mallory has been involved in a car crash, and it appears he has killed his mistress, Holly Mitchell. Steve suffers from amnesia, he has no recollection whatever of the event. His wife is hostile and cold toward him, his father-in-law has been severely disabled by a stroke and his wife's cousin appears to despise him. Added to this is the sinister presence of Lester Aldrich, who turns out to be the downtrodden husband of the sleazy nymphomaniac Holly.

== Cast ==
- George Peppard as Steve Mallory
- Elizabeth Ashley as Alexandria Mallory
- Roddy McDowall as Oliver Parsons
- Arthur O'Connell as Dr. Wheeler
- Mona Washbourne as Catherine Parsons
- Herbert Marshall as Austin Parsons
- Robert Webber as Dom Guardiano
- Charles Drake as Lawrence Conway
- Sally Kellerman as Holly Mitchell
- Arte Johnson as Lester Aldrich
- Vincent Gardenia as Preston

== Production ==
Jack L. Warner was reluctant to make a film about amnesia, but he agreed to finance this one, because he had an expensive deal with George Peppard, who wanted to do the movie. Warner offered the film to Jack Smight in part because I'd Rather Be Rich, Smight's first feature, had been made relatively cheaply and because star George Peppard had worked with Smight before on television. Smight said it was "not a great script by any means, but one with a lot of twists and turns. It dealt with the amnesia of the lead character, which Peppard played. The other characters were quite well written and I felt it had possibilities. Knowing that Peppard was set made me feel that I could make a decent film out of it."

Elizabeth Ashley had started a romantic relationship with George Peppard on The Carpetbaggers and was offered the female lead. She wrote in her memoirs, "I could tell from the script it was going to be a piece of technicolor garbage, but I would be costarring with George. My agents, who were also George's agents, thought it was a good idea and pressured me to make it. It would be a big commercial movie. My name would be above the title, which would make me a real leading lady." She said her fee was $100,000.

Peppard later said "I'm the first one around who knows crap when I see it. When The Third Day came along, I wasn't just broke, I was up to my ears in debt. An actor's responsibility is to keep his career going, not how much art he can turn out. I've got an agent, a lawyer, a public-relations firm, a business manager, an ex-wife, two kids, and Elizabeth Ashley. Responsibilities."

Exterior scenes were filmed along the Russian River, north of the town of Bodega Bay in northern California. Film sites include the Highway 1 bridge crossing the Russian River near the junction with highway 116 and Goat Rock State Beach. Ashley wrote "I could tell while I was making the picture that it was going to be just another piece of garbage. And I knew I was terrible. I couldn't even be good in garbage."

Elizabeth Ashley later recalled:

Warner Brothers made that just to capitalize on our relationship, and it bombed, which served them right. They didn't use me because I was any good as an actress, oh, no, they wanted me because I was sleeping with George and getting all that publicity. That's when I decided, okay, if I'm going to whore. I'm going to be the whoremaster. I'd pick the parts to benefit me. But there weren't any other parts, nothing good, anyway; my name was worthless.

Smight claims he delivered the movie on time and on budget.

== Reception ==
Variety wrote the film "shapes up as an interesting and sometimes suspenseful drama... should be a sturdy box-office entry. Beautifully turned out in Panavision and Technicolor, the Warner release carries sound production values which Robert Surtees’ fluid cameras point up in admirable fashion. A chief weakness lies in the lack of script development."

Filmink called it "a programmer, really – too stagnant, not enough peril, and Peppard lacked big personalities to bounce off. "

According to Smight, "the film did decent business, and to this day the residual payments from TV keep rolling in, for which I’m eternally grateful. Jack Warner was pleased enough to sign me to an added four-picture deal."
