= Pendulum (1969 film) =

1969 film by George Schaefer

- Directed by: George Schaefer
- Written by: Stanley Niss
- Produced by: Stanley Niss
- Starring: George Peppard; Jean Seberg; Richard Kiley
- Cinematography: Lionel Lindon
- Edited by: Hugh S. Fowler
- Music by: Walter Scharf
- Color process: Technicolor
- Production company: Pendulum Productions
- Distributed by: Columbia Pictures
- Release date: March 21, 1969 (New York City)
- Running time: 102 minutes
- Country: United States
- Language: English

Pendulum is a 1969 American neo noir crime thriller film directed by George Schaefer and starring George Peppard, Jean Seberg and Richard Kiley. It was one of a series of medium budgeted genre movies Peppard made around this time.

== Plot ==
In Washington, D.C., police captain Frank Matthews's career is on the rise, having just been appointed consultant for a powerful U.S. senator. His domestic life, however, is questionable. He suspects his wife of having an affair with an old flame. One evening, after appearing at a political function in Baltimore, Matthews decides not to return home until the following morning. The next day, he is informed by authorities that his wife has been discovered shot to death while in bed with her lover, who was also killed. Soon, Matthews is made aware that his own colleagues, the police, have made him the prime suspect in the case.

Pendulum also features a side-plot involving a death row inmate, Paul Sanderson, convicted of rape and murder, who is set free due to a legal technicality. Sanderson had been originally tracked down and arrested by Matthews, who views these circumstances as a grave injustice. Ironically, now that Captain Matthews is a suspected murderer, he hires Sanderson's lawyer, Woodrow Wilson King, to represent him. For the remainder of the feature, these two storylines intersect until the film reaches its violent conclusion.

== Cast ==
- George Peppard as Capt. Frank Matthews
- Jean Seberg as Adele Matthews
- Richard Kiley as Woodrow Wilson King
- Charles McGraw as Deputy Chief John P. Hildebrand
- Madeleine Sherwood as Mrs. Eileen Sanderson
- Robert F. Lyons as Paul Martin Sanderson
- Frank Marth as Lt. Smithson
- Marj Dusay as Liz Tennant
- Paul McGrath as Senator Augustus Cole
- Stewart Moss as Richard D'Angelo
- Isabel Sanford as Effie
- Dana Elcar as Det. J.J. 'Red' Thornton
- Harry Lewis as Brooks Elliot
- Mildred Trares as Mary Schumacher
- Robin Raymond as Myra
- Phyllis Hill as Mrs. Wilma Elliot
- S. John Launer as Judge Kinsella
- Jock Mackelvie as U.S. Attorney Grady Butler
- Richard Guizon as Deputy Marshall Jack Barnes
- Jack Grimes as Artie
- Logan Ramsey as Detective Jelinek
- Douglas Henderson as Detective Hanauer
- Gene Boland as Garland

== Legacy ==
In Quentin Tarantino's 2019 film Once Upon a Time in Hollywood, Pendulum appears on a movie theater marquee that Sharon Tate walks past just before first seeing her own name on the marquee display of The Wrecking Crew at the Fox Bruin Theater.
