= Zohra Lampert =

American actress

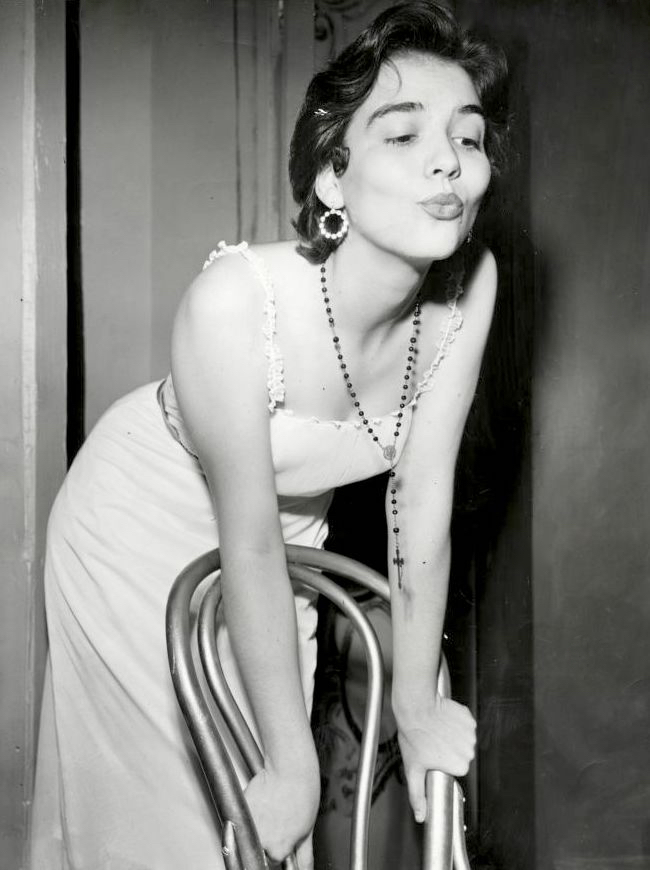
- Zohra Lampert in 1953
- Other name: Zohra Alton
- Education: University of Chicago
- Occupation: Actress
- Years active: 1954-2016
- Spouses: Bill Alton (m. 1957; div. 1980); Jonathan Schwartz (m. 2010)

Zohra Lampert is a retired American actress, who has had roles on stage, film and television. She performed under her then-married name of Zohra Alton early in her career. Lampert achieved critical acclaim for her work on Broadway as well, earning two Tony Award nominations for her roles in Look: We've Come Through (1962) and Mother Courage and Her Children (1963). Her film performances include the title character in the 1971 cult horror film Let's Scare Jessica to Death. She won a Primetime Emmy Award for her guest role in a 1975 episode of Kojak.

== Early life and education ==
Lampert was the only child of Rose and Morris Lampert, both Russian-Jewish immigrants. In 1940, the family lived in the Washington Heights section of Manhattan, and Morris Lampert worked in a hardware store. She attended the High School of Music & Art and the University of Chicago, graduating in 1952. She later studied acting at HB Studio with Uta Hagen; she also studied with Mira Rostova.

== Career ==
Lampert joined other University of Chicago alumni, including Ed Asner and Anthony Holland, in the Playwrights Theatre Club, which was established in Chicago by the theatrical producer David Shepherd. She later said that until she was thrust on stage as Grisha in Berthold Brecht's Caucasian Chalk Circle, in which she had initially joined the cast as assistant scenic designer, she thought "I might want to become something scholarly. A librarian, not an actor." She subsequently appeared as The Actress in Rounddance, drawing praise from Sydney J. Harris of the Chicago Daily News as "unquestionably the find of the summer season. . . a gypsy-like girl with elfin grace and the dramatic constitution of Shirley Booth." She appeared on Broadway as Zohra Alton in the 1956 Broadway production of Diary of a Scoundrel.

She left the Playwrights Theater Club to study acting with Mira Rostova, Montgomery Clift's acting coach, even though her upbringing had taught her that acting "was an unserious thing to do." Along with Alan Arkin, Roger Bowen, and former Playwrights members Bill Alton (her ex-husband) and Andrew Duncan, Lampert became part of the second company of the Second City in Chicago but left for the New York company at Square East in 1961. That same year, Lampert, who began performing under her birth name after her divorce from Alton, gave a Tony-nominated performance in Look: We've Come Through. She also had a pair of small, noteworthy performances in the films Pay or Die (1960) and Splendor in the Grass (1961). In 1964, she became one of the 26 members of the newly established Lincoln Center Repertory Theater company.

In the 1960s/1970s, she was active in supporting roles in film and television including S1E18 of The Man from U.N.C.L.E. titled "The Mad, Mad Tea Party Affair." In 1971, she played the title character in the horror film Let's Scare Jessica to Death. The film becamee a cult classic in later years. In 1975, Lampert won an Outstanding Guest Actress Emmy Award for her performance in an episode of Kojak. In 1977, she co-starred with Gena Rowlands in John Cassavetes' Opening Night.

She was a regular in the sitcom The Girl with Something Extra and the medical drama Doctors' Hospital. During the early 1970s, she originated the role of Ellie Jardin on the CBS soap Where the Heart Is until her character was killed off in 1972. In 1986, she appeared in an episode of Knight Rider (season 4, "Hills of Fire"). She worked less during the 1980s and 1990s. She appeared in The Exorcist III (playing actor George C. Scott's wife) and the 1999 film The Eden Myth.

After a 10-year absence from films, Lampert returned to acting in supporting roles in two films: The Hungry Ghosts (2009) and Zenith (2010).

== Personal life ==
Lampert married radio personality Jonathan Schwartz in 2010. She was previously married to Bill Alton, a founding member of Second City and fellow Playwrights Theater Club actor.

== Filmography ==
=== Film ===
Year	Title	Role	Notes	Ref.
1959	Odds Against Tomorrow	Girl in Bar		
1960	Pay or Die	Adelina Saulino		
1961	Posse from Hell	Helen Caldwell		
1961	Splendor in the Grass	Angelina		
1961	Hey, Let's Twist!	Sharon		
1966	A Fine Madness	Evelyn Tupperman		
1968	Bye Bye Braverman	Etta Rieff		
1969	Some Kind of a Nut	Bunny Erickson		
1971	Let's Scare Jessica to Death	Jessica		
1977	Opening Night	Dorothy Victor		
1984	Alphabet City	Mama		
1984	Teachers	Mrs. Pilikian		
1989	American Blue Note	Louise		
1990	Stanley & Iris	Elaine		
1990	The Exorcist III	Mary Kinderman		
1992	Alan & Naomi	Mrs. Liebman		
1992	Last Supper		short film	
1994	The Last Good Time	Barbara		
1999	The Eden Myth	Alma Speck		
2009	The Hungry Ghosts	Ruth		
2010	Zenith	Ms. Minor		
2014	Sexual Secrets	Alma Speck		

=== Television ===
Year	Title	Role	Notes
1954	A Time to Live	Greta Powers	TV series
1958	Decoy	Anne / Norma Hart	"High Swing", "Cry Revenge"
1960	Cradle Song	Sister Maria Jesus	TV film
1960	Route 66	Sue Ellis	"Layout at Glen Canyon"
1961	The Defenders	Florence Meech / Eve Gideon Tubberbye	"The Prowler", "Gideon's Follies"
1962	Sam Benedict	Sarah Friedman	"Hear the Mellow Wedding Bells"
1963	The Alfred Hitchcock Hour	Marie Petit	Season 1 Episode 18: "A Tangled Web"
1963	Dr. Kildare	Rose Kemmer / Myra Krolik	"The Thing Speaks for Itself", "A Place Among the Monuments"
1963	Naked City	Clara Espuella	"Barefoot on a Bed of Coals"
1964	The Reporter	Molly Gresham	"Super-Star"
1965	The Man from U.N.C.L.E.	Kay Lorrison	"The Mad, Mad Tea Party Affair"
1965	Slattery's People	Asst. District Atty. Arlene Mancuso	"Question: Who Are You Taking to the Main Event, Eddie?"
1965	The Trials of O'Brien	Penelope	"How Do You Get to Carnegie Hall?"
1967	I Spy	Zili	"Blackout"
1969	Then Came Bronson	Mary Draper	"Amid Splinters of the Thunderbolt"
1970	The F.B.I.	Mary Cochella	"Deadfall"
1970–71	Where the Heart Is	Ellie Jardin	TV series
1972	Love, American Style	Nancy Ellis	"Love and the Jinx"
1973	The Connection	Hannah	TV film
1973	The Bob Newhart Show	Janine	"Motel"
1973–74	The Girl with Something Extra	Anne	recurring role
1975	Ladies of the Corridor	Mildred Tynan	TV film
1975	One of Our Own	Dr. Norah Purcell	TV film
1975	Kojak	Marina Sheldon	"Queen of the Gypsies"
1975–76	Doctors' Hospital	Dr. Norah Purcell	main role
1976	Serpico	Anne	"Trumpet of Time"
1976	Hawaii Five-0	Anita Newhall	"Let Death Do Us Part"
1977	Hunter	Deedee	"The K Group: Parts 1 & 2"
1977	Mixed Nuts	Dr. Sarah Allgood	TV short
1977	Switch	Lita Verassiere	"Fade Out"
1978	Quincy, M.E.	Lynn Peters	"Passing"
1978	Black Beauty	Polly Barker	TV miniseries
1978	Kojak	Dr. Ellen Page	"The Halls of Terror"
1978	Hawaii Five-0	Gloria Kozma	"Small Potatoes"
1978	Lady of the House	Julia de Paulo	TV film
1979	The Suicide's Wife	Sharon Logan	TV film
1980	The Girl, the Gold Watch & Everything	Wilma Farnham	TV film
1980	Children of Divorce	Mrs. Goldsmith	TV film
1981	Secrets of Midland Heights	Mme. Zeena	"Letting Go"
1981	The Girl, the Gold Watch & Dynamite	Wilma Farnham	TV film
1982	Romance Theatre		TV series
1984	American Playhouse	Esther Mirkin	"The Cafeteria"
1984	Airwolf	Dr. Lisa Holgate	"Echoes from the Past"
1985	Izzy and Moe	Esther Einstein	TV film
1986	The Equalizer	Veronica Whitney	"Torn"
1986	Knight Rider	Tess Hubbard	"Hills of Fire"
1986	Trapper John, M.D.		"Fall of the Wild"

== Accolades ==
Year	Award	Category	Nominated work	Result	Ref.
1975	Primetime Emmy Awards	Outstanding Single Performance by a Supporting Actress in a Comedy or Drama Series	Kojak (Episode: "Queen of the Gypsies")	Won	
1962	Tony Awards	Best Supporting or Featured Actress in a Play	Look: We've Come Through	Nominated	
1963	Tony Awards	Best Supporting or Featured Actress in a Play	Mother Courage and Her Children	Nominated	
