= Dana Elcar =

American actor (1927–2005)

- Elcar in The F.B.I., 1971
- Born: Ibsen Dana Elcar; October 10, 1927; Ferndale, Michigan, U.S.
- Died: June 6, 2005 (aged 77); Ventura, California, U.S.
- Education: University of Michigan
- Years active: 1952–2002
- Spouses: Katherine Frances Mead (m. 1948–1950) Peggy Romano (m. 1954–1970) Marianne Torrance (m. 1978–1995)
- Partner: Thelma Garcia
- Children: 4

Ibsen Dana Elcar (October 10, 1927 – June 6, 2005) was an American television and film character actor. He appeared in about 40 films as well as in the 1960s television series Dark Shadows as Sheriff George Patterson and the 1980s and 1990s television series MacGyver as Peter Thornton, MacGyver's immediate supervisor at the Phoenix Foundation. Elcar had appeared in the pilot episode of MacGyver as Andy Colson before assuming the role of Thornton.

== Early life ==
Elcar was born in Ferndale, Michigan, the son of Hedwig (née Anderberg) and James Aage Elcar, a carpenter and butcher. He was an alumnus of the University of Michigan where he was a member of the Alpha Tau Omega fraternity. At age 18, Elcar enlisted and served a tour of duty in the United States Navy at the end of World War II. He moved to New York in the 1950s to become a professional thespian. He was a student of legendary acting coach Sanford Meisner. He brought this education to bear when in 1986, with fellow character actor William Lucking, he formed the Santa Paula Theater Center. Elcar sat as artistic director for six years.

== Career ==
In 1962, he created the role of the hitman Ben in the U.S. premiere of Harold Pinter's The Dumb Waiter at the Cherry Lane Theater in Greenwich Village, New York City. That same year he was cast on the long running CBS daytime drama The Guiding Light as Andrew Murray, the District Attorney of Los Angeles County. Later in 1962 and 1963, due to his stint on The Guiding Light, he was cast in three episodes of the NBC sitcom Car 54, Where Are You?, and two segments of the ABC crime drama Naked City, both set in New York City. In 1966-67, Elcar played Sheriff George Patterson on the gothic soap opera Dark Shadows He played Inspector Shiller, the supervisor, in the crime drama, Baretta, starring Robert Blake. As a character actor, Elcar guest-starred in many television shows, including Gunsmoke; Mannix; Ironside; Columbo; Cannon; Benson; Newhart; The Fall Guy; Scarecrow and Mrs. King; Hill Street Blues; The A-Team; Trapper John, M.D.; Matlock; Law & Order; and ER.

Elcar guest starred on Get Smart as KAOS Agent Kruger in the two-part 1969 episode entitled "And Baby Makes Four".. In 1970, he appeared on CBS's Mission: Impossible and Storefront Lawyers. In 1971, he was a guest star on Ironside. He appeared on The Waltons and Kung Fu in 1973. Elcar had a regular role as Colonel Lard in the 1976–78 television military drama, Baa Baa Black Sheep, starring Robert Conrad, and he also directed four episodes of the series. He appeared in TV disaster movies such as Heatwave! (1974) and Crisis in Mid-Air (1979). He also appeared in The Sting (1973).

In 1979, Elcar played judges in Centennial and B. J. and the Bear. In 1980, he was cast in the role of "Chief" (previously played in the TV series by Edward Platt, who died in 1974) in the Get Smart feature film entitled The Nude Bomb (a.k.a. The Return of Maxwell Smart). He also co-starred in two episodes of The A-Team in 1984 and 1985. In 1987, he was cast on Matlock.

Elcar and his stunt/photography double Don S. Davis were often mistaken for each other. Elcar appeared in the hit series Knight Rider in the 1983 episode "Merchants of Death"; as a corrupt sheriff in The Incredible Hulk episode "Escape from Los Santos" (1978), in which Banner is headed to Phoenix;

In 1991, Elcar began to develop glaucoma. This condition was written into the MacGyver plot-line, beginning with the sixth season, seventeenth episode "Blind Faith" and continuing through the remainder of that season and the entire seventh season, with Elcar's character developing the disease. The sixth-season finale, "Hindsight", was a clip show using Pete Thornton's upcoming eye surgery as a framing device. After MacGyver, Elcar made a guest appearance in "Computer Virus" S3;E19, a 1993 episode of Law & Order, in which he played a man who blamed his diabetes-caused blindness on his former physician, and whose son murdered other patients as revenge.

Elcar also played a blind character on episodes of The Magic School Bus and ER. Once blind, Elcar accepted the challenge of playing Vladimir in Waiting for Godot on stage, complete with white cane. This was his theatrical swan song, and he retired in 2002 after his ER performance.

== Personal life ==
Elcar married Katherine Frances Mead in 1948 and divorced her in 1950. He married Peggy Romano in 1954 and divorced her in 1970. Elcar had four children: Marin Elcar, Nora Elcar Verdon, Dane Elcar, and Chandra Elcar. His long-time partner was Thelma Garcia.

=== Death ===
On June 6, 2005, Elcar died at the Community Memorial Hospital in Ventura, California from pneumonia at age 77.

== Filmography ==
=== Film ===
Year	Title	Role	Notes
1964	Fail Safe	Foster	
1965	The Fool Killer	Mr. Dodd	
1968	A Lovely Way to Die	Layton	
1968	The Boston Strangler	Luis Schubert	
1969	Pendulum	Detective J.J. "Red" Thornton	
1969	The Maltese Bippy	Sergeant Kelvaney	
1969	The Learning Tree	Kirky	
1970	Zig Zag	Harold Tracey	
1970	Soldier Blue	Captain Battles	
1970	Adam at 6 A.M.	Van Treadly	
1971	Mrs. Pollifax-Spy	Carstairs	
1971	A Gunfight	Marv Green	
1972	The Great Northfield Minnesota Raid	Allen	
1973	The Sting	FBI Agent Polk	Caper film set in September 1936, involving a complicated plot by two professional grifters, directed by George Roy Hill.
1973	Dying Room Only	The Sheriff	Television film directed by Philip Leacock, adapting Richard Matheson's 1953 short story of the same name.
1975	Report to the Commissioner	Chief Perna	
1976	W.C. Fields and Me	Agent Dockstedter	American biographical film directed by Arthur Hiller and screenplay by Bob Merrill.; Based on a memoir by Carlotta Monti, mistress of legendary actor W.C. Fields for the last 14 years of his life.
1976	Baby Blue Marine	Sheriff Wenzel	
1976	St. Ives	Lieutenant Charles Blunt	
1979	The Champ	Hoffmaster	
1979	Good Luck, Miss Wyckoff	Principal Havermeyer	
1980	The Nude Bomb	Chief	
1980	The Last Flight of Noah's Ark	Benchley	
1981	Buddy Buddy	Captain Hubris	
1981	Condorman	Russ	Adventure comedy superhero film directed by Charles Jarrott, produced by Walt Disney Productions. Inspired by Robert Sheckley's The Game of X, the movie follows comic book illustrator Woodrow Wilkins' attempts to assist in the defection of a female Soviet KGB agent.
1982	Breach of Contract	Unknown	
1983	Blue Skies Again	Lou	
1984	Jungle Warriors	D'Antoni	
1984	All of Me	Burton Schuyler	Fantasy comedy film directed by Carl Reiner.
1984	2010	Dimitri Moisevitch	
1986	Inside Out	Leo Gross	Drama film directed by Robert Taicher.

=== Television ===
Year	Title	Role	Notes
1954	A Time to Live	Dr. Clay	Contract role
1956	The Big Story	Oscar	Episode: "Zeke Scher and George MacWilliams of The Denver Post" (S 8:Ep 11)
1957	The Big Story	Bernie	Episode: "Charley Wigle of The Denver Post aka Young Lovers" (S 8:Ep 26)
1957	The Big Story	Cashmore	Episode: "Malcolm Glover of The San Francisco Examiner aka Car 83" (S 8:Ep 36)
1958	The Big Story	Lieutenant Alameda	Episode: "Until Proven Guilty"
1959	Brenner	The Bartender	Episode: "False Witness" (S 1:Ep 1)
1959	The Play of the Week	Friend Ed	Episode: "Burning Bright" (S 1:Ep 3)
1960	Sunday Showcase	Newspaperman	Episodes: "The Sacco-Vanzetti Story: Part 1" (S 1:Ep 29); "The Sacco-Vanzetti Story: Part 2" (S 1:Ep 30)
1960	Omnibus	Guest	Episode: "He Shall Have Power" (S 8: Ep 1)
1961	Armstrong Circle Theatre	Guest	Episode: "The Medicine Man" (S 12: Ep 7)
1962	The DuPont Show of the Week	Dennis Wilcox	Episode: "Big Deal in Laredo" (S 2:Ep 4)
1962	Guiding Light	District Attorney Andrew Murray	Recurring
1963	Naked City	Al Boris	Episode: "Man Without a Skin" (S 4:Ep 20)
1963	The Armstrong Circle Theatre	Carl Rogers	Episode: "The Embezzler" (S 14:Ep 15)
1963	Hallmark Hall of Fame	Jacob	Episode: "The Patriots" (S 13:Ep 2)
1966–1967	Dark Shadows	Sheriff George Paterson	Recurring
1967	The Borgia Stick	Craigmeyer	Made for TV movie
1968	The Name of the Game	Hood	Episode: 1x02 "Witness"
1968	Mannix	Shérif Viewcola	Season 2 Episode 12 : "Fear I to Fall"
1969	Get Smart	Kruger	Episode: "And Baby Makes Four: Part 2"
1970	Room 222	Everett Stiles	Episode: "The Lincoln Story" (S 2:Ep 3)
1970	Mission: Impossible	C.W. Cameron	Episode: "Flip Side"
1970	Hawaii Five-O	Dr. Benjamin	Three Dead Cows at Makapuu (Part 1 and Part 2)
1972–1975	Cannon	Lieutenant Sam Levaca / Walter Ryan / John 41	1x25 "Cain's Mark", 2x07 "A Long Way Down", 5x13/14 "The Star"
1973	Hawkins	Dr. Aronson	Episode: "Death and the Maiden"
1973	Columbo	Falcon	Episode: "Any Old Port in a Storm"
1973	The Partridge Family	Mr. Felcher	Episode: "Trial of the Partridge One" (Season 3, Episode 16)
1976	Law of the Land	Reverend Endicott	TV movie
1976-1978	Baa Baa Black Sheep	Colonel Thomas A. Lard	Actor: 36 episodes Director: 4 episodes
1978	The Incredible Hulk	Sheriff Harris	Episode "Escape From Los Santos" (S 2:Ep 10)
1979	Centennial	Judge Hart	Episode "The Winds of Death" (Ep 11)
1980	Galactica 1980	Mr. Steadman	Episode "Space Croppers" (S 1:Ep 9)
1981	Benson	Senator Chapman	S.3, Ep.1 "Benson's appointment
1983	Trapper John, M.D.	Jared Vennemar	Episode: "Pasts Imperfect" (S 4:Ep 18)
1983	Knight Rider	Strock	Episode 26: "Merchants of Death"
1984	The A-Team	George Olsen	Episode: "Double Heat" (S 3:Ep 6)
1985	Scarecrow and Mrs. King	Mitch Larner	Episode: "Spiderweb" (S 2:Ep 13)
1985	Hill Street Blues	Lieutenant Mel Taber	Episode: "Washington Deceased" (S 5:Ep 16)
1985	Riptide	Harry Silverman	Episode: "Arrivederci, Baby" (S 2:Ep 21)
1985	The A-Team	Judge Leonard Mordente	Episodes: "Judgement Day: Part 1" (S 4:Ep 1); "Judgement Day: Part 2" (S 4:Ep 2)
1985	There Were Times, Dear	Don Mason	Made-for-TV-Movie directed by Nancy Malone.
1985	Toughlove	Max Wiley	Made-for-TV-Movie directed by Glenn Jordan.
1985	Trapper John, M.D.	Howard Bowman	Episode: "Billboard Barney" (S 7:Ep 9)
1985–1992	MacGyver	Pete Thornton /Andy Colson	Appeared in 85 episodes (but credited in a further 40 episodes; also appeared in the 1985 pilot as character Andy Colson)
1986	Murder in Three Acts	Dr. Strange	Made-for-TV-Movie based on Agatha Christie's book Three Act Tragedy and directed by Gary Nelson.
1987	Matlock	Arthur Hughes	Episode: "The Court-Martial: Part 1" (S 1:Ep 18)
1993	For Their Own Good	Sally's Father	Made-for-TV-Movie directed and co-written by Ed Kaplan.; Uncredited
1993	Law & Order	Robert Cook	Episode: "Virus"
1995	The Magic School Bus	Mr. Terese	Episode: "Going Batty" (S 2:Ep 4)
2002	ER	Manny Kendovich	Episode: "Damage Is Done" (S 8:Ep 13) (final appearance)
