= Doctors' Hospital =

- Genre: Medical drama
- Created by: James E. Moser
- Starring: George Peppard; Victor Campos
- Opening theme: Don Ellis
- Composer: Don Ellis
- Country of origin: United States
- Original language: English
- No. of seasons: 1
- No. of episodes: 13

Production
- Executive producer: Matthew Rapf
- Producer: Jack Laird
- Cinematography: Isidore Mankofsky
- Camera setup: Single-camera
- Running time: 48 mins.
- Production company: Universal Television

Original release
- Network: NBC
- Release: September 10, 1975 – January 14, 1976

Doctors' Hospital is an American medical drama that ran on NBC during the 1975–1976 season.

== Synopsis ==
The series follows the neurosurgery team at the fictional Lowell Memorial Hospital in Los Angeles, led by Dr. Jake Goodwin (George Peppard) and his staff, including residents Norah Purcell (Zohra Lampert), and Felipe Ortega (Victor Campos), and nurse Hestor Stanton (Adrian Ricard). Other cast members included John Larroquette and John Pleshette. Toward the end of the season, Peppard announced that he did not wish to continue in his role on the series. Producers reportedly wanted to retool the series and make Lampert's character the central figure, but NBC did not feel the actress had the name recognition to carry the show (despite the fact that she had just won an Emmy for a guest appearance on an episode of Kojak), and decided to cancel the series.

Though it lasted only one season, the series was noted for injecting a sense of realism not otherwise seen in medical shows of the day (e.g. Marcus Welby, M.D., Ben Casey). It has often been cited as setting a tone that later shows like St. Elsewhere, ER, and Chicago Hope would expand on.

== Episodes ==
No. overall	No. in season	Title	Directed by	Written by	Original release date
1	1	"Point of Maximum Pressure"	Leo Penn	Story by : Teleplay by : Barry Oringer	September 10, 1975
Goodwin introduces four interns of varying promise to the pressures of life in the hospital's neurosurgical wing.
2	2	"Come At Last To Love"	Vincent Sherman	Story by : Teleplay by : Chester Krumholz	September 17, 1975
Two separate stories unfold as a pregnant woman refuses needed brain surgery out of fear for her unborn child, and a nurse becomes a human guinea pig to test an anti-viral serum developed by the doctor she loves.
3	3	"Sleepless and Pale Eyelids"	David Friedkin	Story by : Teleplay by : Morton S. Fine	September 24, 1975
A staph epidemic threatens the hospital
4	4	"But Who Will Bless Thy Daughter Norah?"	Edward M. Abroms	Story by : Teleplay by : Barry Oringer	October 1, 1975
Engulfed in personal and professional crises, Dr. Purcell considers quitting her job for a less hectic, better-paying position with an industrial firm.
5	5	"The Loneliest Night"	Unknown	Story by : Teleplay by :	October 8, 1975
A suicidal young woman is brought to the hospital after she was hit by a car while wandering down the freeway under the influence of codeine.
6	6	"Vital Signs"	Edward M. Abroms	Story by : Teleplay by : Jeff Freilich and Chester Krumholz	October 29, 1975
The doctors become involved in childbeating cases.
7	7	"Knives Of Chance"	David Friedkin	Story by : Teleplay by : Howard Dimsdale	November 5, 1975
Goodwin questions the quality of work performed by two staff physicians
8	8	"My Cup Runneth Over"	Lawrence Doheny	Story by : Teleplay by : Chester Krumholz and Adrian Spies	November 12, 1975
A resident suspects that an experience physician has misdiagnosed a concert pianist's condition and insists that the patient be given a definitive test that in itself could prove fatal.
9	9	"Watchman, Who Will Guard Thy Sleep?"	Edward M. Abroms	Story by : Teleplay by : Chester Krumholz and Sue Milburn	December 3, 1975
A hospitalized movie magnate (Robert Loggia) rebels at being assigned a homosexual orderly.
10	10	"And Sorrow For Angels"	Larry Yust	Story by : Teleplay by : Chester Krumholz and Charles McDaniel	December 10, 1975
A young priest (Andrew Robinson) and a strong willed intern (Barbara Feldon) are severely tested by duty in the neurosurgical wing.
11	11	"Surgeon, Heal Thyself"	Sigmund Neufeld Jr.	Story by : Teleplay by : Oliver Crawford	December 17, 1975
A brilliant neurosurgeon (William Windom) avoids grave responsibilities by working himself to the point of exhaustion.
12	12	"And Hear a Sudden Cry"	Jeannot Szwarc	Story by : Teleplay by : Chester Krumholz	January 6, 1976
Seeking relief from excruciating pain, a fashion model (Lara Parker) turns to heroin and eventually to prostitution and thievery.
13	13	"Swan Dive aka Lullaby"	Edward M. Abroms	Story by : Teleplay by : Chester Krumholz, Barry Oringer, and Halsted Welles	January 14, 1976
An empathic resident (Robert Walden) finds a particular challenge in a policewoman (Talia Shire) who can't cope with recurring attacks of impaired vision.
