= List of Lassie (1954 TV series) episodes =

The Lassie 50th Anniversary DVD set, released September 14, 2004, contains highlights from all years of the series

Created by Robert Maxwell, Lassie premiered on CBS on September 12, 1954, where it aired for seventeen seasons, before moving to first run syndication for its final two seasons. The final episode of the series aired on March 24, 1973. Maxwell also acted as the show's producer until 1957, when Jack Wrather purchased the production company and show. He would be the show's producer for the rest of its run. The series continued to air in rerun syndication (both on broadcast TV and cable), off and on, for another 50 years. In syndication, the episodes in which Lassie was paired with the Miller family were often aired under the name Jeff's Collie, while the years with the Martin family were sometimes aired under the name Timmy & Lassie.

The 591-episode series is generally broken into five parts, based on the ownership of Lassie. The "Miller years" (Jeff's Collie) comprise the first three seasons of the series and part of the fourth, during which Lassie is owned by Jeff Miller (Tommy Rettig). In the middle of the fourth season, the unexpected death of George Cleveland is mirrored in the show with the unexpected death of his character, "Gramps." The farm is then sold to the Martin family, which also adopts Ellen Miller's foster child, Timmy (Jon Provost), and Jeff gives Lassie to Timmy to help him cope. The "Martin years" (Timmy & Lassie) would run until 1964.

At the opening of the 11th season, a job transfer sees the Martins moving to Australia and having to leave Lassie behind in the United States. After a brief stay with family friend Cully Wilson, Lassie joins Corey Stuart (Robert Bray), a ranger with the United States Forestry Service. Early in the 15th season, Stuart is badly injured in a forest fire, but Lassie remains with the forest service in the care of rangers Scott Turner (Jed Allan) and Bob Erickson (Jack De Mave). The "Ranger years" end at the end of the 16th season.

During the 17th season, the series became somewhat of an anthology, as Lassie is now (with no explanation) on her own without human caretakers, traveling from place to place, helping people and other animals as needed before moving on to her next destination. Season 17 would be the series' last on CBS, which canceled the series in 1971 as part of the "rural purge" (a move to replace what was seen as rural/family based shows with what was deemed to be more urban centered, "socially relevant" programming). During the final two seasons (the "Holden Ranch years"), the show moved to first-run syndication, and Lassie was taken in by the caretakers of the Holden Ranch - a ranch for troubled children - where she settled in for the remainder of the series.

== Series overview ==
Season	Setting	Episodes	Originally released		
Season	Setting	Episodes	First released	Last released	Network
1	Miller years (Jeff's Collie)	26	September 12, 1954	March 6, 1955	CBS
2	Miller years (Jeff's Collie)	39	September 11, 1955	June 3, 1956	CBS
3	Miller years (Jeff's Collie)	38	September 9, 1956	May 26, 1957	CBS
4	Martin years (Timmy & Lassie)	40	September 8, 1957	June 8, 1958	CBS
5	Martin years (Timmy & Lassie)	39	September 7, 1958	May 31, 1959	CBS
6	Martin years (Timmy & Lassie)	37	September 6, 1959	May 22, 1960	CBS
7	Martin years (Timmy & Lassie)	36	September 11, 1960	May 28, 1961	CBS
8	Martin years (Timmy & Lassie)	36	September 10, 1961	May 27, 1962	CBS
9	Martin years (Timmy & Lassie)	32	September 30, 1962	May 19, 1963	CBS
10	Martin years (Timmy & Lassie)	29	September 29, 1963	May 3, 1964	CBS
11	Ranger years	33	September 6, 1964	May 16, 1965	CBS
12	Ranger years	32	September 12, 1965	May 1, 1966	CBS
13	Ranger years	30	September 11, 1966	April 30, 1967	CBS
14	Ranger years	28	September 10, 1967	March 24, 1968	CBS
15	Ranger years	28	September 29, 1968	April 13, 1969	CBS
16	Ranger years	22	September 28, 1969	March 8, 1970	CBS
17	On her own	22	September 20, 1970	March 21, 1971	CBS
18	Holden Ranch years	20	October 7, 1971	March 10, 1972	Syndication
19	Holden Ranch years	24	September 16, 1972	March 24, 1973	Syndication

== Episodes ==
=== Miller years ===
==== Season 1 (1954–55) ====
No. overall	No. in season	Title	Directed by	Written by	Original release date
1	1	"Inheritance"	Leslie Goodwins	Claire Kennedy	September 12, 1954
2	2	"Arithmetic"	Sheldon Leonard	Claire Kennedy	September 19, 1954
3	3	"The Colt"	Sheldon Leonard	Claire Kennedy	September 26, 1954
4	4	"The Gun"	Sidney Salkow	Jackson Gillis	October 3, 1954
5	5	"Mr. Peabody"	Sheldon Leonard	David Chantler	October 10, 1954
6	6	"The Convict"	Thomas Carr	Claire Kennedy	October 17, 1954
7	7	"Feud"	Sheldon Leonard	Claire Kennedy	October 24, 1954
8	8	"The Lion"	Sheldon Leonard	Claire Kennedy	October 31, 1954
9	9	"Gramps"	Sidney Salkow	Claire Kennedy	November 7, 1954
10	10	"Lassie's Pups"	Sheldon Leonard	Claire Kennedy	November 14, 1954
11	11	"The Job"	Sidney Salkow	Claire Kennedy	November 21, 1954
12	12	"The Carnival"	Sidney Salkow	Claire Kennedy	November 28, 1954
13	13	"Sale of Lassie"	Rod Amateau	Claire Kennedy	December 5, 1954
14	14	"The Rustlers"	Sidney Salkow	Jackson Gillis	December 12, 1954
15	15	"The Fighter"	Sidney Salkow	Claire Kennedy	December 19, 1954
16	16	"The Contest"	Hollingsworth Morse	Monroe Manning, Alan Woods	December 26, 1954
17	17	"Runaways"	Sidney Salkow	David Chantler	January 2, 1955
18	18	"The Brat"	Lesley Selander	Claire Kennedy	January 9, 1955
19	19	"Father"	Sidney Salkow	Claire Kennedy	January 16, 1955
20	20	"The Fawn"	Lesley Selander	Claire Kennedy	January 23, 1955
21	21	"Blind Soldier"	Lesley Selander	Claire Kennedy, Milton Geiger	January 30, 1955
22	22	"The Cave"	Thomas Carr	Claire Kennedy, Inez Asher	February 6, 1955
23	23	"The Injury"	Lesley Selander	Claire Kennedy	February 13, 1955
24	24	"The Well (Note: "The Well" was filmed as one of the two original pilot episodes, along with episode 1 ("Inheritance").)"	Leslie Goodwins	Claire Kennedy	February 20, 1955
25	25	"The Snake"	Sidney Salkow	Claire Kennedy	February 27, 1955
26	26	"The Bear"	Thomas Carr	Claire Kennedy	March 6, 1955

==== Season 2 (1955–56) ====
No. overall	No. in season	Title	Directed by	Written by	Original release date
27	1	"The Runt"	Lesley Selander	Lillie Hayward	September 11, 1955
28	2	"The Pit"	Lesley Selander	David Chantler	September 18, 1955
29	3	"The Kittens"	Maurice Geraghty	Mortimer Braus	September 25, 1955
30	4	"The Dog Show"	Philip Ford	Jackson Gillis	October 2, 1955
31	5	"The School"	Lesley Selander	Jackson Gillis	October 9, 1955
32	6	"The Violin"	Lesley Selander	Herbert Little, Jr and David Victor	October 16, 1955
33	7	"The Monster"	Lesley Selander	Wells Root and Claire Kennedy	October 23, 1955
34	8	"The Witch"	Lesley Selander	Jackson Gillis, Curtis Kenyon	October 30, 1955
35	9	"The Wild Duck"	Lesley Selander	Story by : Wells Root; Teleplay by : Wells Root and Claire Kennedy	November 6, 1955
36	10	"The Rival"	Lesley Selander	Thelma Robinson	November 13, 1955
37	11	"The Newspaper"	Lesley Selander	Joel Andrews	November 20, 1955
38	12	"The Clown"	Lesley Selander	Hortense Williams and Claire Kennedy	November 27, 1955
39	13	"The Twister"	Lesley Selander	Claire Kennedy	December 4, 1955
40	14	"Gramps' Birthday"	Lesley Selander	Marguerite Gallien	December 11, 1955
41	15	"The Gypsies"	Lesley Selander	Marguerite Gallien	December 18, 1955
42	16	"The Gift"	Philip Ford	Sumner Long	December 25, 1955
43	17	"The Stamp Album"	Maurice Geraghty	Jackson Gillis	January 1, 1956
44	18	"The Dog Catcher"	Lesley Selander	Marianne Mosner	January 8, 1956
45	19	"Pokey"	Maurice Geraghty	Sumner Long	January 15, 1956
46	20	"The Trial"	Leonard Freeman	Leonard Freeman and Eric Scott	January 22, 1956
47	21	"The Hawk"	Maurice Geraghty	Barney Slater	January 29, 1956
48	22	"The Tree House"	Lesley Selander	Sumner Long	February 5, 1956
49	23	"The Visitor"	Maurice Geraghty	Eric Freiwald and Robert Schaefer	February 12, 1956
50	24	"The Raft"	Philip Ford	Claire Kennedy	February 19, 1956
51	25	"The Journey"	Maurice Geraghty	Thelma Robinson	February 26, 1956
52	26	"The Vet"	Philip Ford	Claire Kennedy	March 4, 1956
53	27	"Lassie's Double"	Maurice Geraghty	Mortimer Braus	March 11, 1956
54	28	"The Child"	Lesley Selander	Howard Dimsdale	March 18, 1956
55	29	"The Leash"	Arthur Hilton	Gwen Bagni	March 25, 1956
56	30	"Sunday School"	Philip Ford	Joel Andrews	April 1, 1956
57	31	"The Deer Hunter"	Philip Ford	Paul David	April 8, 1956
58	32	"Domino"	Lesley Selander	Jackson Gillis	April 15, 1956
59	33	"The Marauder"	Philip Ford	John McGreevey	April 22, 1956
60	34	"The Calf"	Maurice Geraghty	Sumner Long	April 29, 1956
61	35	"The Crop Duster"	Philip Ford	John McGreevey	May 6, 1956
62	36	"War Dog"	Lesley Selander	David Dortort	May 13, 1956
63	37	"The Haircut"	Philip Ford	Richard Sanville	May 20, 1956
64	38	"Diane"	Philip Ford	Claire Kennedy	May 27, 1956
65	39	"The Frog"	Philip Ford	Claire Kennedy	June 3, 1956

==== Season 3 (1956–57) ====
No. overall	No. in season	Title	Directed by	Written by	Original release date
66	1	"Bee Hive"	Lesley Selander	Paul David	September 9, 1956
67	2	"Friendship"	Lesley Selander	Original Story by : Richard Sanville; Teleplay by : Paul David	September 16, 1956
68	3	"Quarantine"	Lesley Selander	Jack Jacobs	September 23, 1956
69	4	"Bone"	Lesley Selander	Seymour Kern	September 30, 1956
70	5	"The Watch"	Lesley Selander	John McGreevey	October 7, 1956
71	6	"Hoax"	Lesley Selander	Joanne Court	October 14, 1956
72	7	"The Fish Story"	Lesley Selander	Joanne Court	October 21, 1956
73	8	"Transfusion"	Lesley Selander	Seymour Kern	October 28, 1956
74	9	"Local Elections"	Philip Ford	Paul David	November 4, 1956
75	10	"Gossip"	Philip Ford	Dick Mack and Bob Mitchell	November 11, 1956
76	11	"Fish Conservation"	Lesley Selander	Seymour Kern	November 18, 1956
77	12	"Challenge"	Philip Ford	Robert Bloomfield	November 25, 1956
78	13	"Tractor"	Philip Ford	Robert Bloomfield	December 2, 1956
79	14	"The Goats"	Philip Ford	Arthur Richards and Richard Wormser	December 9, 1956
80	15	"A Place For Everything"	Lesley Selander	Tom Kilpatrick	December 16, 1956
81	16	"Party Line"	Philip Ford	Paul David	December 23, 1956
82	17	"Superstition"	Philip Ford	Frank and Doris Hursley	December 30, 1956
83	18	"Good-bye Forever"	Philip Ford	Pauline Stone	January 6, 1957
84	19	"Lassie's Vanity"	Philip Ford	Seymour Kern	January 13, 1957
85	20	"Champion"	Philip Ford	Vincent Forte	January 20, 1957
86	21	"Vigil"	Philip Ford	Edmond Kelso	January 27, 1957
87	22	"The Chimp"	Lesley Selander	Sumner Long	February 3, 1957
88	23	"Lassie's Day"	Lesley Selander	Seymour Kern	February 10, 1957
89	24	"The Rock"	Lesley Selander	Mona Fisher	February 17, 1957
90	25	"The Artist"	Lesley Selander	Elizabeth Beecher	February 24, 1957
91	26	"Survival"	Lesley Selander	Joanne Court	March 3, 1957
92	27	"Bird Watchers"	Philip Ford	Doris Hursley	March 10, 1957
93	28	"The Dog House"	Philip Ford	Sumner Long	March 17, 1957
94	29	"The Search"	Lesley Selander	Edmond Kelso	March 24, 1957
95	30	"Boy's Day"	Philip Ford	David Chandler and Claire Kennedy	March 31, 1957
96	31	"The Snob"	Lesley Selander	Miriam Geiger	April 7, 1957
97	32	"Haunted House"	Philip Ford	Claire Kennedy	April 14, 1957
98	33	"The Nest"	Lesley Selander	Homer McCoy	April 21, 1957
99	34	"Father Ellen"	Lesley Selander	Frank and Doris Hursley, Claire Kennedy	April 28, 1957
100	35	"Poverty"	Lesley Selander	Homer McCoy, Edward E. Seabrook	May 5, 1957
101	36	"The Apple Tree"	Philip Ford	Tom Allen II	May 12, 1957
102	37	"The Harvesters"	Philip Ford	Fran Dill (story and teleplay)	May 19, 1957
103	38	"Jeff's Moustache"	Philip Ford	Sumner Long	May 26, 1957

=== Martin years ===
In syndication, these seasons were often retitled to Timmy and Lassie.

==== Season 4 (1957–58) ====
No. overall	No. in season	Title	Directed by	Written by	Original release date
104	1	"The Runaway"	Philip Ford	Paul David	September 8, 1957
105	2	"The Suit"	John English	Sumner Long	September 15, 1957
106	3	"Graduation"	Philip Ford	Claire Kennedy (story and teleplay)	September 22, 1957
107	4	"The Burro"	Philip Ford	Sumner Long	September 29, 1957
108	5	"The Berry Pickers"	Philip Ford	Paul David	October 6, 1957
109	6	"The Raccoon"	Philip Ford	Dusty Bruce, Paul David	October 13, 1957
110	7	"The Ballerina"	Philip Ford	Paul David	October 20, 1957
111	8	"The Elephant"	Ralph Murphy	Sumner Long	October 27, 1957
112	9	"The Spartan"	Ralph Murphy	Paul David	November 3, 1957
113	10	"Happy"	John English	Sumner Long	November 10, 1957
114	11	"The Wolf Cub"	Philip Ford	Sumner Long	November 17, 1957
115	12	"The Tooth"	Philip Ford	Inez Asher, Peggy Chantler Dick	November 24, 1957
116	13	"Transition"	Maurice Geraghty	Claire Kennedy	December 1, 1957
117	14	"Timmy's Family"	Maurice Geraghty	Jessica Benson	December 8, 1957
118	15	"The Bike"	Philip Ford	J.E. Selby	December 15, 1957
119	16	"The Goose"	Philip Ford	Ed Adamson	December 22, 1957
120	17	"The Baby-Sitter"	Philip Ford	Charles O'Neal, Joseph Shaftel	December 29, 1957
121	18	"The Crisis"	Philip Ford	Vincent Forte	January 5, 1958
122	19	"The Business"	Philip Ford	Sumner Long	January 12, 1958
123	20	"The Ring"	R.G. Springsteen	Claire Kennedy	January 19, 1958
124	21	"The Greyhound"	Lesley Selander	T.C. Lengyel	January 26, 1958
125	22	"Inoculation"	Lesley Selander	J.E. Selby	February 2, 1958
126	23	"The Pony"	Lesley Selander	Edmond Kellso	February 9, 1958
127	24	"The Square Dance"	Philip Ford	Paul David	February 16, 1958
128	25	"Sinbad"	Lesley Selander	Pauline Stone, Michael Cosgrove	February 23, 1958
129	26	"The Garden"	Philip Ford	Sumner Long	March 2, 1958
130	27	"Concussion"	Philip Ford	J.E. Selby	March 9, 1958
131	28	"The Hungry Deer"	R.G. Springsteen	Miriam Geiger, T.C. Lengyer	March 16, 1958
132	29	"The Hospital"	Lesley Selander	Ed Adamson	March 23, 1958
133	30	"The Penguin"	Philip Ford	Claire Kennedy, Miriam Geiger	March 30, 1958
134	31	"The Bird House"	Philip Ford	Sumner Long	April 6, 1958
135	32	"Seeing Eye Dog"	Lesley Selander	Mel Chartlan, Miriam Geiger	April 13, 1958
136	33	"Junior Firemen"	Lesley Selander	J.E. Selby	April 20, 1958
137	34	"The Blanket"	Philip Ford	Ed Adamson	April 27, 1958
138	35	"The Rabbits"	Philip Ford	James Henerson	May 4, 1958
139	36	"The Cub Scout"	Philip Ford	Pauline Stone, Mike Cosgrove	May 11, 1958
140	37	"The Crow"	Philip Ford	Sumner Long	May 18, 1958
141	38	"The Mother"	Lesley Selander	Ruth Church, Michael Cosgrove	May 25, 1958
142	39	"The House Guest"	Lesley Selander	Ruth Church, James S. Henerson	June 1, 1958
143	40	"The Sermon"	Philip Ford	Jessica Benson	June 8, 1958

==== Season 5 (1958–59) ====
No. overall	No. in season	Title	Directed by	Written by	Original release date
144	1	"The Storm"	Lesley Selander	Vincent Forte	September 7, 1958
145	2	"Wishing"	Harold D. Schuster	Sumner Long	September 14, 1958
146	3	"The Teacher"	Lesley Selander	Rita Church, Jo Conway	September 21, 1958
147	4	"The Owl"	Lesley Selander	Ellis Marcus	September 28, 1958
148	5	"The Crash"	Lesley Selander	Arnold Belgard, John Belgard	October 5, 1958
149	6	"The Rocking Chair"	Harold D. Schuster	Sumner Long	October 12, 1958
150	7	"Fish Out of Water"	Lesley Selander	Bill Kelsay	October 19, 1958
151	8	"Trapped"	George Archainbaud	Monroe Manning, Alan Woods	October 26, 1958
152	9	"Our Gal"	George Archainbaud	Arthur Fitz-Richard	November 2, 1958
153	10	"Lassie's Decision"	George Archainbaud	Bill Kelsay	November 9, 1958
154	11	"The Egret"	George Archainbaud	Will Gould	November 16, 1958
155	12	"The Archers"	Abby Berlin	Arnold Belgard, Miriam Geiger	November 23, 1958
156	13	"The Bundle from Britain"	George Archainbaud	Arnold Belgard	November 30, 1958
157	14	"The Black Woods"	Franklin Adreon	Homer McCoy	December 7, 1958
158	15	"The Raffle"	Franklin Adreon	J.E. Selby	December 14, 1958
159	16	"The Christmas Story"	George Archainbaud	Monroe Manning, Rose Mathias, Alan Woods	December 21, 1958
160	17	"The Lady Bugs"	Abby Berlin	Jessica Benson	December 28, 1958
161	18	"Junior GIs"	Franklin Adreon	Arnold Belgard	January 4, 1959
162	19	"The Big Cat"	Lesley Selander	Monroe Manning, Alan Woods	January 11, 1959
163	20	"The Tree"	Abby Berlin	Will Gould	January 18, 1959
164	21	"Timmy, The Oil Millionaire"	George Archainbaud	Monroe Manning, Alan Woods	January 25, 1959
165	22	"Beholden"	Franklin Adreon	Jackson Gillis	February 1, 1959
166	23	"Tartan Queen"	William Witney	Arnold Belgard	February 8, 1959
167	24	"The Horse Show"	George Archainbaud	Sumner Long	February 15, 1959
168	25	"The Cat That Came To Dinner"	Franklin Adreon	Ted Thomas, Jan Leman	February 22, 1959
169	26	"The Bonnet"	George Archainbaud	Sumner Long	March 1, 1959
170	27	"The Puppy Story"	Franklin Adreon	Jackson Gillis	March 8, 1959
171	28	"The Young Flyers"	Franklin Adreon	Pauline Stone, Mike Cosgrove	March 15, 1959
172	29	"The Watch Dog"	Abby Berlin	Robert Lees	March 22, 1959
173	30	"Rock Hound"	Franklin Adreon	Bill Kelsay	March 29, 1959
174	31	"The Puppet"	Franklin Adreon	Sumner Long	April 5, 1959
175	32	"The Charm"	Maurice Geraghty	Eric Freiwald	April 12, 1959
176	33	"Teamwork"	Franklin Adreon	Ellis Marcus, Ann Marcus	April 19, 1959
177	34	"Stable Mates"	Franklin Adreon	J.E. Selby	April 26, 1959
178	35	"Peace Patrol"	Franklin Adreon	Arnold Belgard	May 3, 1959
179	36	"The Camera"	Franklin Adreon	J.E. Selby	May 10, 1959
180	37	"Swami"	Franklin Adreon	James S. Henerson	May 17, 1959
181	38	"Campout"	Franklin Adreon	Jackson Gillis	May 24, 1959
182	39	"Lassie's Guest"	Franklin Adreon	Sumner Long	May 31, 1959

==== Season 6 (1959–60) ====
No. overall	No. in season	Title	Directed by	Written by	Original release date
183	1	"The New Refrigerator"	Norman Morgan	Sumner Long	September 6, 1959
184	2	"Old Henry"	Earl Bellamy	Oliver Drake, Rose Mathias	September 13, 1959
185	3	"The Contest"	Hollingsworth Morse	Monore Manning, Alan Woods	September 20, 1959
186	4	"The Mascot"	Hollingsworth Morse	Monroe Manning, Alan Woods	September 27, 1959
187	5	"The Sulky Race"	Earl Bellamy	Monroe Manning, Alan Woods	October 4, 1959
188	6	"Growing Pains"	Hollingsworth Morse	Arnold Belgard, Rose Mathias	October 11, 1959
189	7	"The Flying Machine"	Hollingsworth Morse	Ruth Church, Richard Fisher	October 18, 1959
190	8	"The UNICEF Story"	Norman Morgan	Ruth Church, Miriam Geiger	October 25, 1959
191	9	"Water Boy"	Hollingsworth Morse	Hendrik Vollaerts	November 1, 1959
192	10	"The Whopper"	Hollingsworth Morse	Harold Shumate	November 8, 1959
193	11	"The Bounty Hunter"	Earl Bellamy	J.E. Selby	November 15, 1959
194	12	"The Land Grabber"	Hollingsworth Morse	Ellis Marcus	November 22, 1959
195	13	"The Man from Mars"	Hollingsworth Morse	Sumner Long	November 29, 1959
196	14	"In Case of Emergency"	Hollingsworth Morse	Sid Harris, Betty Hopkins	December 6, 1959
197	15	"Star Reporter"	Earl Bellamy	Steven Michaels, Elwood Ullman	December 20, 1959
198	16	"Alias Jack and Joe"	George Blair	Arnold Belgard, Steven Michaels	December 27, 1959
199	17	"Judas Goat"	Earl Bellamy	J.E. Selby, Richard Sanville	January 3, 1960
200	18	"The Space Traveler"	Hollingsworth Morse	Charles Smith	January 10, 1960
201	19	"The Maverick"	Earl Bellamy	Monroe Manning, Alan Woods	January 17, 1960
202	20	"The Grasshopper and the Ant"	Hollingsworth Morse	Hendrik Vollaerts	January 24, 1960
203	21	"Homing Pigeon"	Hollingsworth Morse	Sumner Long	January 31, 1960
204	22	"The Explorers"	Earl Bellamy	Arnold Belgard	February 7, 1960
205	23	"The Epidemic"	Hollingsworth Morse	Monroe Manning, Alan Woods	February 14, 1960
206	24	"Fur-Coated Killer"	Hollingsworth Morse	Les Farber, Maria Fagyas	February 21, 1960
207	25	"Judgment Seat"	Hollingsworth Morse	Harold Shumate	February 28, 1960
208	26	"The Elephant"	Ralph Murphy	Sumner Long	March 6, 1960
209	27	"Clementine"	Hollingsworth Morse	J.E. Selby, Richard Sanville	March 13, 1960
210	28	"The Puppy Sitter"	Hollingsworth Morse	Jackson Gillis	March 20, 1960
211	29	"Champ"	Oliver Drake	Oliver Drake	March 27, 1960
212	30	"The Phone Hog"	Hollingsworth Morse	J.E. Selby, Richard Sanville	April 3, 1960
213	31	"The Chase"	Hollingsworth Morse	George Beck, Jo Conway, Monroe Manning	April 10, 1960
214	32	"The Killer"	Hollingsworth Morse	David Boehm, Steven Michaels	April 17, 1960
215	33	"The Moved Monument"	Hollingsworth Morse	Monroe Manning	April 24, 1960
216	34	"The Alligator"	Hollingsworth Morse	Will Gould	May 1, 1960
217	35	"The Wrong Gift"	Gerald Schnitzer	Sumner Long	May 8, 1960
218	36	"The Fog"	George Blair	David Boehm	May 15, 1960
219	37	"The Hermit"	George Blair	Ruth Church, Elwood Ullman	May 22, 1960

==== Season 7 (1960–61) ====
No. overall	No. in season	Title	Directed by	Written by	Original release date
220	1	"Blacktail"	Gerald Schnitzer	Maurice Geraghty, Sumner Long	September 11, 1960
221	2	"The Wallaby"	Hollingsworth Morse	Will Gould	September 18, 1960
222	3	"Cully's New Pet"	William Beaudine	William Beaudine	September 25, 1960
223	4	"The Rescue"	Hollingsworth Morse	Monroe Manning	October 2, 1960
224	5	"Feathered Menace"	Hollingsworth Morse	Monroe Manning	October 9, 1960
225	6	"The Gentle Tiger"	Hollingsworth Morse	Monroe Manning	October 16, 1960
226	7	"The Renegade"	Hollingsworth Morse	Monroe Manning	October 23, 1960
227	8	"The Blind Dog"	Oliver Drake	Oliver Drake	October 30, 1960
228	9	"The Swallows of Los Pinos"	Oliver Drake	Oliver Drake	November 6, 1960
229	10	"Sea Serpent"	Hollingsworth Morse	J.E. Selby, Richard Sanville	November 13, 1960
230	11	"Visiting Colt"	Hollingsworth Morse	Monroe Manning	November 20, 1960
231	12	"Little Cabbage"	Jeffrey Hayden	Z.C. Cramer	November 27, 1960
232	13	"The Big Race"	Hollingsworth Morse	Monroe Manning	December 4, 1960
233	14	"Bows and Arrows"	Hollingsworth Morse	J.E. Selby, Richard Sanville	December 18, 1960
234	15	"The Christmas Story"	Jack B. Hively	Monroe Manning	December 25, 1960
235	16	"The White-Faced Bull"	Hollingsworth Morse	J.E. Selby, Richard Sanville	January 1, 1961
236	17	"Apron Strings"	William Beaudine	Hendrik Vollaerts	January 8, 1961
237	18	"The Wild Horse"	William Beaudine	Sumner Long	January 15, 1961
238	19	"The Mad Dog"	William Beaudine	Sumner Long	January 22, 1961
239	20	"The Trip"	Hollingsworth Morse	J.E. Selby	January 29, 1961
240	21	"Shadrack"	William Beaudine	Les Farber, Maria Fagyas	February 5, 1961
241	22	"The Patriot"	Gerald Schnitzer	Oliver Drake	February 12, 1961
242	23	"The Eagle"	William Beaudine	Sumner Long	February 19, 1961
243	24	"Cracker Jack"	Hollingsworth Morse	Z.C. Cramer	February 26, 1961
244	25	"Cully's Hound Dog"	William Beaudine	Hendrik Vollaerts	March 5, 1961
245	26	"The Fire Watchers"	Jack B. Hively	Monroe Manning	March 12, 1961
246	27	"Senor Coyote"	William Beaudine	William Beaudine	March 19, 1961
247	28	"Bessie"	William Beaudine	J.E. Selby, Richard Sanville	March 26, 1961
248	29	"The Pigeon"	William Beaudine	Joanne Court	April 2, 1961
249	30	"Long Chase"	Hollingsworth Morse	Z.C. Cramer	April 9, 1961
250	31	"The Ostrich"	William Beaudine	Sandy Spillman	April 16, 1961
251	32	"Fool's Gold"	Gerald Schnitzer	Oliver Drake	April 23, 1961
252	33	"The Greyhound"	Lesley Selander	T.C. Lengyel	April 30, 1961
253	34	"Rodeo"	Austen Jewell	Z.C. Cramer	May 14, 1961
254	35	"The Search"	Dick Darley	Sumner Long	May 21, 1961
255	36	"Timmy and the Martians"	William Beaudine	F. Paul Hall	May 28, 1961

==== Season 8 (1961–62) ====
No. overall	No. in season	Title	Directed by	Written by	Original release date
256	1	"Lassie at the Grand Canyon"	Jack B. Hively	Z.C. Cramer	September 10, 1961
257	2	"The Bloodhound"	Joseph Sargent (uncredited)	William Beaudine (uncredited)	September 17, 1961
258	3	"The Mysterious Intruder"	Joseph Sargent (uncredited)	William Beaudine (uncredited)	September 24, 1961
259	4	"The Badger Game"	William Beaudine	Dwight Hauser	October 1, 1961
260	5	"The Outlaw"	Hollingsworth Morse	Francis Rosenwald	October 8, 1961
261	6	"The Winner"	William Beaudine	Joanne Court	October 15, 1961
262	7	"Heat Wave"	Hollingsworth Morse	Les Farber	October 22, 1961
263	8	"The Deer"	William Beaudine	Edward Gruskin	October 29, 1961
264	9	"Lassie Adopts the Fire Chief"	Joseph Sargent (uncredited)	William Beaudine (uncredited)	November 5, 1961
265	10	"The Pied Piper"	William Beaudine	Les Farber	November 12, 1961
266	11	"Joey"	Joseph Sargent (uncredited)	Joseph Sargent (uncredited)	November 19, 1961
267	12	"The Dognappers"	William Beaudine	Marianne Mosner	November 26, 1961
268	13	"Lassie's Wild Baby"	Hollingsworth Morse	Jessica Benson	December 3, 1961
269	14	"The Dove"	William Beaudine	Will Gould	December 17, 1961
270	15	"Yochim's Christmas"	Hollingsworth Morse	Z.C. Cramer	December 24, 1961
271	16	"The Parrot"	William Beaudine	Bruce Henry, Monroe Manning	December 31, 1961
272	17	"Lassie's Protege"	Hollingsworth Morse	Z.C. Cramer	January 7, 1962
273	18	"The Black Sheep"	Hollingsworth Morse	Monroe Manning	January 14, 1962
274	19	"The Partnership"	Hollingsworth Morse	Z.C. Cramer	January 21, 1962
275	20	"The Hike"	Joseph Sargent	Joanne Court	January 28, 1962
276	21	"Bird of Prey"	Hollingsworth Morse	Francis Rosenwald	February 4, 1962
277	22	"Casey"	William Beaudine	Francis Rosenwald	February 11, 1962
278	23	"The Odyssey I"	William Beaudine	Sumner Long	February 18, 1962
279	24	"The Odyssey II"	William Beaudine	Sumner Long	February 25, 1962
280	25	"The Odyssey III"	William Beaudine	Sumner Long	March 4, 1962
281	26	"Double Trouble"	Hollingsworth Morse	Monroe Manning	March 11, 1962
282	27	"Eager Beaver"	Hollingsworth Morse	Francis Rosenwald	March 18, 1962
283	28	"Lassie and the Eagle"	William Beaudine	Joanne Court	March 25, 1962
284	29	"The Vindication of Relentless"	William Beaudine	Monroe Manning	April 1, 1962
285	30	"The Unwanted"	William Beaudine	Eric Freiwald, Robert Schaefer	April 8, 1962
286	31	"The Musher"	William Beaudine, Jr	Dwight Hauser	April 15, 1962
287	32	"Lassie's Good Deed"	Hollingsworth Morse	Sumner Long	April 29, 1962
288	33	"Sanctuary"	Hollingsworth Morse	Monroe Manning	May 6, 1962
289	34	"Lassie and the Calf"	William Beaudine	Sumner Long	May 13, 1962
290	35	"Elephant Sitters"	William Beaudine	Z.C. Cramer	May 20, 1962
291	36	"Lassie and the Tiger"	William Beaudine	Francis Rosenwald	May 27, 1962

==== Season 9 (1962–63) ====
No. overall	No. in season	Title	Directed by	Written by	Original release date
292	1	"Fine Feathered Friend"	William Beaudine	Sumner Arthur Long	September 30, 1962
293	2	"Quick Brown Fox"	William Beaudine	Dwight Hauser	October 7, 1962
294	3	"Desperate Search"	Hollingsworth Morse	David Richards	October 14, 1962
295	4	"Home Within a Home"	William Beaudine	Peggy Phillips	October 21, 1962
296	5	"Deadly Goats"	Hollingsworth Morse	Monroe Manning	October 28, 1962
297	6	"Fawn Patrol"	William Beaudine	Virginia M. Cooke	November 4, 1962
298	7	"Gentle Savage"	William Beaudine	Dwight Hauser	November 11, 1962
299	8	"The Nest"	Hollingsworth Morse	Eric Freiwald, Robert Schaefer	November 18, 1962
300	9	"Lassie's Ordeal"	Joseph Sargent	Monroe Manning	November 25, 1962
301	10	"Howling Hero"	Hollingsworth Morse	Francis Rosenwald	December 2, 1962
302	11	"A Career for Lassie"	William Beaudine	William Beaudine	December 16, 1962
303	12	"Show Dog"	Hollingsworth Morse	J.E. Selby	December 30, 1962
304	13	"Decision"	George Archainbaud	Bill Kelsay	January 6, 1963
305	14	"A Specialist for Lassie"	Jack B. Hively	Jess Carneol, Kay Lenard	January 13, 1963
306	15	"Lassie's Lonely Burden"	Hollingsworth Morse	Z.C. Cramer	January 20, 1963
307	16	"Swimmers"	Joseph Sargent	Peggy Phillips	January 27, 1963
308	17	"Lassie's Fish Story"	Robert Dwan	William R. Cox, Lee Frederic	February 3, 1963
309	18	"Cully's Revenge"	William Beaudine	Francis Rosenwald	February 10, 1963
310	19	"The Journey I"	William Beaudine	Monroe Manning & Charles O'Neal (original story by Sumner Long (Note: Incorrectly spelled as Summer Long in the endtitles.))	February 17, 1963
311	20	"The Journey II"	William Beaudine	Monroe Manning & Charles O'Neal (original story by Sumner Long)	February 24, 1963
312	21	"The Journey III"	William Beaudine	Monroe Manning & Charles O'Neal (original story by Sumner Long)	March 3, 1963
313	22	"The Journey IV"	William Beaudine	Monroe Manning & Charles O'Neal (original story by Sumner Long)	March 10, 1963
314	23	"The Journey V"	William Beaudine	Monroe Manning & Charles O'Neal (original story by Sumner Long)	March 17, 1963
315	24	"Project Bluebirds"	Joseph Sargent	Jessica Benson	March 24, 1963
316	25	"The Twister"	Joseph Sargent	Monroe Manning	March 31, 1963
317	26	"Lassie and the Rustler"	William Beaudine	Jessica Benson	April 7, 1963
318	27	"Lady from Nevada"	William Beaudine	Warren Douglas	April 14, 1963
319	28	"Operation Woodland"	Joseph Sargent	James Douglass West	April 21, 1963
320	29	"Weasel Warfare"	Joseph Sargent	Dwight Hauser	April 28, 1963
321	30	"Silver Soldier"	William Beaudine	David Richards	May 5, 1963
322	31	"A Matter of Pride"	William Beaudine	Z.C. Cramer, Francis Rosenwald	May 12, 1963
323	32	"Eagle's Lair"	Joseph Sargent	Jerry Thomas	May 19, 1963

==== Season 10 (1963–64) ====
No. overall	No. in season	Title	Directed by	Written by	Original release date
324	1	"Lassie and the Birdwatch"	William Beaudine	James Douglas West	September 29, 1963
325	2	"The Agreement"	Joseph Sargent	Robert Schaefer, Eric Freiwald	October 6, 1963
326	3	"Lassie to the Rescue"	Joseph Sargent	Monroe Manning	October 13, 1963
327	4	"Jeeper"	Joseph Sargent	David Richards	October 20, 1963
328	5	"A Time for Giving"	Jack B. Hively	James Douglass West	October 27, 1963
329	6	"Three Alarm"	William Beaudine	Robert Schaefer, Eric Freiwald	November 3, 1963
330	7	"The Treasure (1)"	Hollingsworth Morse	David Richards	November 10, 1963
331	8	"The Treasure (2)"	Hollingsworth Morse	David Richards	November 17, 1963
332	9	"Lassie and the Winged Enemy"	William Beaudine	Orville H. Hampton	December 1, 1963
333	10	"High Tension"	Hollingsworth Morse	J.E. Selby, Richard Sanville	December 8, 1963
334	11	"Lassie's Gift of Love (1)"	Hollingsworth Morse	Kay Lenard, Jess Carneol	December 15, 1963
335	12	"Lassie's Gift of Love (2)"	Hollingsworth Morse	Kay Lenard, Jess Carneol	December 22, 1963
336	13	"Day of Darkness"	William Beaudine	David Richards	December 29, 1963
337	14	"Horse Thief"	William Beaudine	Christopher Bose, Z.C. Cramer	January 5, 1964
338	15	"Her Master's Voice"	Joseph Sargent	Joseph Sargent	January 12, 1964
339	16	"A Challenge for Lassie"	Jack B. Hively, Hollingsworth Morse	Christopher Bose, Z.C. Cramer	January 19, 1964
340	17	"The Disappearance (1)"	John English	Robert Schaefer and Eric Freiwald	February 2, 1964
341	18	"The Disappearance (2)"	John English	Robert Schaefer and Eric Freiwald	February 9, 1964
342	19	"The Disappearance (3)"	John English	Robert Schaefer and Eric Freiwald	February 16, 1964
343	20	"The Disappearance (4)"	John English	Robert Schaefer and Eric Freiwald	February 23, 1964
344	21	"The Disappearance (5)"	John English	Robert Schaefer and Eric Freiwald	March 1, 1964
345	22	"Lassie Counts Sheep"	Hollingsworth Morse	Orville H. Hampton	March 8, 1964
346	23	"Lassie and the Moving Mountain"	William Beaudine	Orville H. Hampton	March 15, 1964
347	24	"Lassie and the Piglets"	William Beaudine, Jr	Monroe Manning	March 22, 1964
348	25	"Guide Dog"	William Beaudine	J.E. Selby	April 5, 1964
349	26	"Bee Line"	William Beaudine	J.E. Selby, Richard Sanville	April 12, 1964
350	27	"Hit and Run"	John English	Jack Paritz	April 19, 1964
351	28	"Lassie and the Savage"	John English	Orville H. Hampton	April 26, 1964
352	29	"The Samaritans"	William Beaudine	Jessica Benson	May 3, 1964

=== Ranger years ===
==== Season 11 (1964–65) ====
This is the last season to be produced in black-and-white

No. overall	No. in season	Title	Directed by	Written by	Original release date
353	1	"The Wayfarers (1)"	Paul Nickell	Jack Paritz	September 6, 1964
354	2	"The Wayfarers (2)"	William Beaudine	Jack Paritz	September 13, 1964
355	3	"The Wayfarers (3)"	Paul Nickell	Story by : Jack Paritz; Teleplay by : Jack Paritz, Robert Schaefer and Eric Freiwald	September 20, 1964
356	4	"Lassie and the Eaglets"	Jack B. Hively	Robert Schaefer and Eric Freiwald	September 27, 1964
357	5	"Climb the Mountain Slowly"	Jack B. Hively	Robert Schaefer and Eric Freiwald	October 4, 1964
358	6	"Leave It to Lassie and the Beavers"	John English	Robert Schaefer and Eric Freiwald	October 11, 1964
359	7	"Lassie and the Shifting Sands"	Paul Nickell	Robert Schaefer and Eric Freiwald	October 18, 1964
360	8	"Lassie and the Loner"	William Beaudine	Monroe Manning	October 25, 1964
361	9	"Lassie and the Fugitive (1)"	John English	Robert Schaefer and Eric Freiwald	November 8, 1964
362	10	"Lassie and the Fugitive (2)"	John English	Robert Schaefer and Eric Freiwald	November 15, 1964
363	11	"Nature's Way"	Christian Nyby	Vernon E. Clark	November 22, 1964
364	12	"Crossroad"	Jack B. Hively	Robert Schaefer, Eric Freiwald	November 29, 1964
365	13	"Mountain Mystery"	Paul Nickell	James Douglass West	December 6, 1964
366	14	"Realm of the Wild"	William Beaudine	Robert Schaefer, Eric Freiwald	December 13, 1964
367	15	"The Little Christmas Tree"	William Beaudine	Robert Schaefer, Eric Freiwald	December 20, 1964
368	16	"Lassie Works a Miracle"	William Beaudine	Barry Shipman	December 27, 1964
369	17	"It's an Ill Wind"	John English	Jennings Cobb	January 3, 1965
370	18	"Lassie and the Girl in the Canyon"	Christian Nyby	Jack Paritz	January 10, 1965
371	19	"Stranger in the Woods"	William Beaudine	Robert Schaefer, Eric Freiwald	January 24, 1965
372	20	"High Water"	Jack B. Hively	Robert Schaefer, Eric Freiwald	January 31, 1965
373	21	"The Loser"	Jack B. Hively	Robert Schaefer, Eric Freiwald	February 7, 1965
374	22	"The Old Man in the Forest"	Jack B. Hively	Robert Schaefer, Eric Freiwald	February 14, 1965
375	23	"Look Homeward, Lassie (1)"	Jack B. Hively	Robert Schaefer and Eric Freiwald	February 21, 1965
376	24	"Look Homeward, Lassie (2)"	Jack B. Hively	Robert Schaefer and Eric Freiwald	February 28, 1965
377	25	"Look Homeward, Lassie (3)"	Jack B. Hively	Robert Schaefer and Eric Freiwald	March 7, 1965
378	26	"Day of Devotion"	John English	Robert Schaefer and Eric Freiwald	March 14, 1965
379	27	"Tinderbox"	Jack B. Hively	Robert Schaefer and Eric Freiwald	March 21, 1965
380	28	"Lassie and the Swamp Girl"	William Beaudine	Jack Paritz	March 28, 1965
381	29	"Trouble Below Zero"	William Beaudine	Robert Schaefer, Eric Freiwald	April 4, 1965
382	30	"Runaround"	Jack B. Hively	Robert Schaefer, Eric Freiwald	April 11, 1965
383	31	"Long Ears"	John English	Robert Schaefer, Eric Freiwald	April 25, 1965
384	32	"Lassie's Teamwork"	William Beaudine	Robert Schaefer and Eric Freiwald	May 9, 1965
385	33	"Honor Bright"	John English	Robert Schaefer and Eric Freiwald	May 16, 1965

==== Season 12 (1965–66) ====
All episodes (season 12 and onwards) in color

No. overall	No. in season	Title	Directed by	Written by	Original release date
386	1	"Lassie Meets a Challenge"	Larry Lansburgh	Barry Shipman	September 12, 1965
387	2	"Sudden Fury"	Christian Nyby	Robert Schaefer and Eric Freiwald	September 19, 1965
388	3	"Lassie and the Dynamite"	John English	Vernon E. Clark	September 26, 1965
389	4	"Lassie and the Seagull"	Christian Nyby	Robert Schaefer and Eric Freiwald	October 3, 1965
390	5	"Charlie Banana"	Jack B. Hively	Robert Schaefer and Eric Freiwald	October 10, 1965
391	6	"In the Eyes of Lassie"	Jack B. Hively	Barry Shipman, James Douglas West	October 17, 1965
392	7	"Trouble at Paradise Lake"	Jack B. Hively	James Douglass West	October 24, 1965
393	8	"Little Dog Lost"	John English	Robert Schaefer, Eric Freiwald	October 31, 1965
394	9	"Lassie's Time of Peril"	John English	Monroe Manning	November 7, 1965
395	10	"In the Midst of Splendor"	Christian Nyby	Robert Schaefer, Eric Freiwald	November 14, 1965
396	11	"Lassie Saves a Life"	William Beaudine	Vernon E. Clark	November 21, 1965
397	12	"The Waif"	John English	Robert Schaefer, Eric Freiwald	November 28, 1965
398	13	"Crisis"	Jack B. Hively	Robert Schaefer, Eric Freiwald	December 5, 1965
399	14	"Pitfall"	Christian Nyby	Robert Schaefer, Eric Freiwald	December 12, 1965
400	15	"Temper the Wind"	Dick Moder	Robert Schaefer, Eric Freiwald	December 19, 1965
401	16	"The Gift of Life"	John English	Robert Schaefer, Eric Freiwald	December 26, 1965
402	17	"Lassie Catches the Poachers"	Dick Moder	Vernon E. Clark	January 2, 1966
403	18	"The Town That Wouldn't Die"	John English	Robert Schaefer, Eric Freiwald	January 16, 1966
404	19	"Just One Old Cow"	Jack B. Hively	Robert Schaefer, Eric Freiwald	January 23, 1966
405	20	"The Outcast"	William Beaudine, Jr	Jennings Cobb	January 30, 1966
406	21	"Cradle of the Deep"	Jack B. Hively	Robert Schaefer and Eric Freiwald	February 6, 1966
407	22	"The Homesick Hound"	Jack B. Hively	Robert Schaefer and Eric Freiwald	February 13, 1966
408	23	"The Silent Threat"	William Beaudine	Robert Schaefer and Eric Freiwald	February 20, 1966
409	24	"The Friendless"	Jack B. Hively	Barry Shipman	February 27, 1966
410	25	"Avelanche"	Dick Moder	Robert Schaefer and Eric Freiwald	March 6, 1966
411	26	"Babes in the Woods"	Jack B. Hively	Robert Schaefer and Eric Freiwald	March 13, 1966
412	27	"Lassie's Rescue Mission"	John English	Robert Schaefer and Eric Freiwald	March 20, 1966
413	28	"The Doll"	Dick Moder	Robert Schaefer and Eric Freiwald	March 27, 1966
414	29	"The Untamed Land"	Jack B. Hively	Robert Schaefer and Eric Freiwald	April 3, 1966
415	30	"The Day the Mountain Shook"	Jack B. Hively	Robert Schaefer and Eric Freiwald	April 17, 1966
416	31	"The Vigil"	William Beaudine, Jr	Jennings Cobb	April 24, 1966
417	32	"The Strongest Instinct"	Dick Moder	James Douglas West	May 1, 1966

==== Season 13 (1966–67) ====
No. overall	No. in season	Title	Directed by	Written by	Original release date
418	1	"Lassie and the Buffalo"	William Beaudine	Orville H. Hampton	September 11, 1966
419	2	"Danger Mountain"	Richard C. Moder	Robert Schaefer and Eric Freiwald	September 18, 1966
420	3	"Fly Away Home"	Jack B. Hively	Robert Schaefer and Eric Freiwald	September 25, 1966
421	4	"A Time for Courage"	William Beaudine	Robert Schaefer and Eric Freiwald	October 2, 1966
422	5	"Lassie Baits a Bear"	William Beaudine	Barry Shipman	October 9, 1966
423	6	"Lassie the Voyager (1)"	Richard C. Moder	Robert Schaefer and Eric Freiwald	October 16, 1966
424	7	"Lassie the Voyager (2)"	Jack B. Hively	Robert Schaefer and Eric Freiwald	October 23, 1966
425	8	"Lassie the Voyager (3)"	Richard C. Moder	Robert Schaefer and Eric Freiwald	October 30, 1966
426	9	"Lassie the Voyager (4)"	Jack B. Hively	Robert Schaefer and Eric Freiwald	November 6, 1966
427	10	"Lassie the Voyager (5)"	Dick Moder	Robert Schaefer and Eric Freiwald	November 13, 1966
428	11	"Lassie the Voyager (6)"	Jack B. Hively	Robert Schaefer and Eric Freiwald	November 20, 1966
429	12	"Lassie the Voyager (7)"	Jack B. Hively	Robert Schaefer and Eric Freiwald	November 27, 1966
430	13	"Little Jim"	Jack B. Hively	Robert Schaefer and Eric Freiwald	December 4, 1966
431	14	"The Greatest Gift"	Jack B. Hively	Robert Schaefer and Eric Freiwald	December 25, 1966
432	15	"Once Upon a Horse"	Dick Moder	James Douglass West	January 1, 1967
433	16	"Interlude of Mercy"	Jack B. Hively	Robert Schaefer and Eric Freiwald	January 8, 1967
434	17	"Crisis at Devil's Gorge"	Dick Moder	Robert Schaefer and Eric Freiwald	January 15, 1967
435	18	"Lassie's Litter Bit"	Dick Moder	James Douglass West	January 22, 1967
436	19	"Day of the Bighorn"	William Beaudine	Robert Schaefer and Eric Freiwald	January 29, 1967
437	20	"The Protectors"	William Beaudine, Jr	Robert Schaefer and Eric Freiwald	February 5, 1967
438	21	"A Matter of Seconds"	Jack B. Hively	Robert Schaefer and Eric Freiwald	February 19, 1967
439	22	"Never Look Back"	William Beaudine	Robert Schaefer and Eric Freiwald	February 26, 1967
440	23	"The Eighth Life of Henry IV"	Dick Moder	Robert Schaefer and Eric Freiwald	March 5, 1967
441	24	"Lure of the Wild"	William Beaudine, Jr	Robert Schaefer and Eric Freiwald	March 12, 1967
442	25	"Most Dangerous Game"	Jack B. Hively	James Douglass West	March 19, 1967
443	26	"Barney"	William Beaudine	James Douglass West	April 2, 1967
444	27	"Return of the Charm"	Dick Moder	Robert Schaefer and Eric Freiwald	April 9, 1967
445	28	"Winged Attack"	Jack B. Hively	Robert Schaefer and Eric Freiwald	April 16, 1967
446	29	"Goliath"	Dick Moder	Robert Schaefer and Eric Freiwald	April 23, 1967
447	30	"Trapped"	Jack B. Hively	Robert Schaefer and Eric Freiwald	April 30, 1967

==== Season 14 (1967–68) ====
No. overall	No. in season	Title	Directed by	Written by	Original release date
448	1	"Perils of the Prairie"	Jack B. Hively	Robert Schaefer and Eric Freiwald	September 10, 1967
449	2	"Inferno"	William Beaudine	Robert Schaefer and Eric Freiwald	September 17, 1967
450	3	"Cry of the Wild"	William Beaudine	Robert Schaefer and Eric Freiwald	September 24, 1967
451	4	"The Guardian"	William Beaudine	Robert Schaefer and Eric Freiwald	October 1, 1967
452	5	"Starfire"	William Beaudine	Robert Schaefer and Eric Freiwald	October 8, 1967
453	6	"Brink of Oblivion"	Jack B. Hively	Robert Schaefer and Eric Freiwald	October 15, 1967
454	7	"The Homeless"	William Beaudine	Robert Schaefer and Eric Freiwald	October 22, 1967
455	8	"A Time for Decision"	Robert Sparr	Robert Schaefer and Eric Freiwald	October 29, 1967
456	9	"Rim of Disaster (1)"	Dick Moder	James Douglass West	November 5, 1967
457	10	"Rim of Disaster (2)"	Dick Moder	James Douglass West	November 12, 1967
458	11	"Ride the Mountain"	Dick Moder	Robert Schaefer and Eric Freiwald	November 19, 1967
459	12	"Dangerous Journey"	Robert Sparr	Robert Schaefer and Eric Freiwald	November 26, 1967
460	13	"Fury at Wind River"	Robert Sparr	Robert Schaefer and Eric Freiwald	December 3, 1967
461	14	"Showdown"	Jack B. Hively	Robert Schaefer and Eric Freiwald	December 17, 1967
462	15	"Miracle of the Dove"	Jack B. Hively	Robert Schaefer and Eric Freiwald	December 24, 1967
463	16	"Have You Any Wool?"	William Beaudine	Jennings Cobb	December 31, 1967
464	17	"The Bracelet"	Dick Moder	S.H. Barnett	January 7, 1968
465	18	"The Foundling"	William Beaudine	James Douglass West	January 14, 1968
466	19	"Rescue Ridge"	Dick Moder	Robert Schaefer, Eric Freiwald	January 21, 1968
467	20	"White Wilderness"	Jack B. Hively	Robert Schaefer, Eric Freiwald	January 28, 1968
468	21	"The Lost One"	Dick Moder	Robert Schaefer, Eric Freiwald	February 4, 1968
469	22	"The Searchers"	Dick Moder	Robert Schaefer, Eric Freiwald	February 11, 1968
470	23	"Countdown"	Dick Moder	Robert Schaefer, Eric Freiwald	February 18, 1968
471	24	"Escape to Danger"	Jack B. Hively	Jennings Cobb	February 25, 1968
472	25	"The Ledge"	Andy McCullogh	Collin MacKenzie and S.H. Barnett	March 3, 1968
473	26	"Hanford's Point (1)"	Jack B. Hively	Robert Schaefer and Eric Freiwald	March 10, 1968
474	27	"Hanford's Point (2)"	Jack B. Hively	Robert Schaefer and Eric Freiwald	March 17, 1968
475	28	"Hanford's Point (3)"	Jack B. Hively	Robert Schaefer and Eric Freiwald	March 24, 1968

==== Season 15 (1968–69) ====
No. overall	No. in season	Title	Directed by	Written by	Original release date
476	1	"Lassie's Race for Life"	Robert Sparr	Robert Schaefer and Eric Freiwald	September 29, 1968
477	2	"Burst of Freedom"	William Beaudine	L. Allan Scott	October 6, 1968
478	3	"Holocaust: Part I"	Dick Moder	Robert Schaefer and Eric Freiwald	October 13, 1968
479	4	"Holocaust: Part II"	Dick Moder	Robert Schaefer and Eric Freiwald	October 20, 1968
480	5	"Last Frontier"	Dick Moder	Robert Schaefer and Eric Freiwald	October 27, 1968
481	6	"Eagle's Dynasty"	Dick Moder	Robert Schaefer and Eric Freiwald	November 3, 1968
482	7	"Day of the Wolf"	Dick Moder	Robert Schaefer and Eric Freiwald	November 10, 1968
483	8	"Glacier Canyon"	Dick Moder	Robert Schaefer and Eric Freiwald	November 17, 1968
484	9	"Track of the Jaguar (1)"	Jack B. Hively	Robert Schaefer and Eric Freiwald	November 24, 1968
485	10	"Track of the Jaguar (2)"	Jack B. Hively	Robert Schaefer and Eric Freiwald	December 1, 1968
486	11	"New Horizon"	Robert Sparr	Robert Schaefer and Eric Freiwald	December 8, 1968
487	12	"Out of the Frying Pan"	William Beaudine	Colin MacKenzie and S.H. Barnett	December 15, 1968
488	13	"Lassie and the 4-H Boys"	William Beaudine	Vernon E. Clark	December 29, 1968
489	14	"Deadly Game"	William Beaudine, Jr	Robert Schaefer, Eric Freiwald	January 5, 1969
490	15	"What Price Valor? (1)"	William Beaudine, Jr	Colin MacKenzie and S.H. Barnett	January 12, 1969
491	16	"What Price Valor? (2)"	Jack B. Hively	Colin MacKenzie and S.H. Barnett	January 19, 1969
492	17	"A Chance to Live"	Dick Moder	James Douglass West	January 26, 1969
493	18	"The Return Home"	Dick Moder	James Douglass West	February 2, 1969
494	19	"Tempest (1)"	Tom Beemer	James Douglass West	February 9, 1969
495	20	"Tempest (2)"	Tom Beemer	James Douglass West	February 16, 1969
496	21	"To Catch a Crow"	Robert Sparr	Jennings Cobb	February 23, 1969
497	22	"Walden"	Dick Moder	Frank L. Moss	March 2, 1969
498	23	"The Stalker"	William Wiard	Robert Schaefer and Eric Freiwald	March 9, 1969
499	24	"Price of Wisdom"	Jack B. Hively	Robert Schaefer and Eric Freiwald	March 16, 1969
500	25	"Night of the Ghost"	Jack B. Hively	Robert Schaefer and Eric Freiwald	March 23, 1969
501	26	"Time of Crisis"	Jack B. Hively	Robert Schaefer and Eric Freiwald	March 30, 1969
502	27	"Lassie and the Flying Squirrels"	William Beaudine, Jr	Robert Schaefer and Eric Freiwald	April 6, 1969
503	28	"Moonshiners"	William Wiard	William Hellinger and Clint Young	April 13, 1969

==== Season 16 (1969–70) ====
No. overall	No. in season	Title	Directed by	Written by	Original release date
504	1	"Last Chance"	Jack B. Hively	Robert Schaefer, Eric Freiwald	September 28, 1969
505	2	"Success Story"	Dick Moder	Frank L. Moss	October 5, 1969
506	3	"Patsy"	Jack B. Hively	Robert Schaefer, Eric Freiwald	October 12, 1969
507	4	"No Margin for Error"	Dick Moder	Frank L. Moss	October 19, 1969
508	5	"Lassie and the Water Bottles"	Sigmund Neufeld, Jr	Vernon E. Clark	October 26, 1969
509	6	"Survival"	Lesley Selander	Joanne Court	November 2, 1969
510	7	"Father and Son"	James B. Clark	Frank L. Moss	November 9, 1969
511	8	"The Sky is Falling"	Sigmund Neufeld, Jr	Robert Schaefer, Eric Freiwald	November 16, 1969
512	9	"No Greater Love"	James B. Clark	Robert Schaefer, Eric Freiwald	November 23, 1969
513	10	"More Than Meets the Eye"	James B. Clark	Robert Schaefer, Eric Freiwald	November 30, 1969
514	11	"The Chase"	Dick Moder	Robert Schaefer, Eric Freiwald	December 14, 1969
515	12	"The Blessing"	Bonita Granville Wrather	Robert Schaefer, Eric Freiwald	December 21, 1969
516	13	"Superstition Canyon"	Sigmund Neufeld, Jr	Robert Schaefer, Eric Freiwald	December 28, 1969
517	14	"The Road Back (1)"	Dick Moder	Robert Schaefer, Eric Freiwald	January 4, 1970
518	15	"The Road Back (2)"	Dick Moder	Robert Schaefer, Eric Freiwald	January 11, 1970
519	16	"The Road Back (3)"	Dick Moder	Robert Schaefer, Eric Freiwald	January 18, 1970
520	17	"The Road Back (4)"	Dick Moder	Robert Schaefer, Eric Freiwald	January 25, 1970
521	18	"Winged Rescue"	Dick Moder	Robert Schaefer, Eric Freiwald	February 1, 1970
522	19	"The Cliff"	James B. Clark	Robert Schaefer, Eric Freiwald	February 8, 1970
523	20	"Warm Heart--Cold Nose"	Dick Moder	Colin MacKenzie, S.H. Barnett	February 15, 1970
524	21	"Whitewater Fury"	Tom Beemer	James Douglass West	March 1, 1970
525	22	"Chucka"	Dick Moder	Robert Schaefer, Eric Freiwald	March 8, 1970

=== On her own ===
==== Season 17 (1970–71) ====
This is the last season to air originally on CBS.

No. overall	No. in season	Title	Directed by	Written by	Original release date
526	1	"Lassie's Interlude"	Dick Moder	Robert Schaefer and Eric Freiwald	September 20, 1970
527	2	"The Birth"	Jack B. Hively	Story by : Paul Casey; Teleplay by : Paul Casey and Joanne Court	September 27, 1970
528	3	"The Survival"	Dick Moder	Paul Casey	October 4, 1970
529	4	"The Miracle"	Jack B. Hively	Paul Casey	October 11, 1970
530	5	"The Innocents"	Dick Moder	Robert Schaefer and Eric Freiwald	October 11, 1970
531	6	"The Offering"	Jack B. Hively, Sigmund Neufeld Jr. and James B. Clark	Robert Schaefer and Eric Freiwald	October 25, 1970
532	7	"Nature's Child"	Sigmund Neufeld Jr.	Robert Schaefer and Eric Freiwald	November 1, 1970
533	8	"Flock of Love"	Jack B. Hively	Robert Schaefer and Eric Freiwald	November 8, 1970
534	9	"Aftermath"	William Beaudine, Jr	James Douglass West	November 15, 1970
535	10	"Here Comes Glory! (1)"	Jack Hively	Robert Schaefer and Eric Freiwald	November 22, 1970
536	11	"Here Comes Glory! (2)"	Dick Moder	Robert Schaefer and Eric Freiwald	November 29, 1970
537	12	"A Year of Sundays"	Dick Moder	Robert Schaefer and Eric Freiwald	December 6, 1970
538	13	"Any Heart in a Storm"	Dick Moder	Joanne Court	December 13, 1970
539	14	"Gentle Dawn"	James B. Clark	Robert Schaefer and Eric Freiwald	January 10, 1971
540	15	"Lassie's Busy Day"	William Beaudine, Jr	Robert Schaefer and Eric Freiwald	January 17, 1971
541	16	"The River"	Tom Beemer	Robert I. Holt	January 24, 1971
542	17	"Other Pastures, Other Fences"	James B. Clark	Jennings Cobb	January 31, 1971
543	18	"The Awakening"	Jack B. Hively	Frank L. Moss	February 7, 1971
544	19	"Troubled Waters"	Jack B. Hively	Robert Schaefer and Eric Freiwald	February 21, 1971
545	20	"For the Love of Lassie (1)"	Jack B. Hively, Sigmund Neufeld Jr. and James B. Clark	Robert Schaefer and Eric Freiwald	February 28, 1971
546	21	"For the Love of Lassie (2)"	Jack B. Hively, Sigmund Neufeld Jr. and James B. Clark	Robert Schaefer and Eric Freiwald	March 7, 1971
547	22	"Sneakers"	Dick Moder	Robert Schaefer and Eric Freiwald	March 21, 1971

=== Holden Ranch years ===
==== Season 18 (1971–72) ====
This is the first season to air in first-run syndication

No. overall	No. in season	Title	Directed by	Written by	Original release date
548	1	"Fury Falls"	Arthur Nadel	Robert Schaefer and Eric Freiwald	October 7, 1971
549	2	"Search for Yesterday"	Richard L. Bare	Robert Schaefer and Eric Freiwald	October 14, 1971
550	3	"Trouble Tracks"	Richard L. Bare	Robert Schaefer and Eric Freiwald	October 21, 1971
551	4	"Wings of the Ghost"	Arthur Nadel	Robert Schaefer and Eric Freiwald	October 21, 1971
552	5	"Homecoming"	Arthur Nadel	Robert Schaefer and Eric Freiwald	November 4, 1971
553	6	"Orphan of the Wild"	Arthur H. Nadel	Robert Schaefer and Eric Freiwald	November 11, 1971
554	7	"Day of Disaster"	Ezra Stone	Robert Schaefer and Eric Freiwald	November 18, 1971
555	8	"The Schemer"	Dick Darley	Robert Schaefer and Eric Freiwald	November 25, 1971
556	9	"The Flying Grandpa"	Dick Darley	Robert Schaefer and Eric Freiwald	December 2, 1971
557	10	"Mustang (1)"	Dick Moder	Robert Schaefer and Eric Freiwald	December 9, 1971
558	11	"Mustang (2)"	Dick Moder	Robert Schaefer and Eric Freiwald	December 16, 1971
559	12	"Roundup"	Richard L. Bare	Robert Schaefer and Eric Freiwald	January 13, 1972
560	13	"Dream Seeker"	Richard L. Bare	Robert Schaefer and Eric Freiwald	January 20, 1972
561	14	"Peace is Our Profession (1)"	Ezra Stone	Robert Schaefer and Eric Freiwald	January 28, 1972
562	15	"Peace is Our Profession (2)"	Ezra Stone	Robert Schaefer and Eric Freiwald	February 4, 1972
563	16	"Peace is Our Profession (3)"	Ezra Stone	Robert Schaefer and Eric Freiwald	February 11, 1972
564	17	"Peace is Our Profession (4)"	Ezra Stone	Robert Schaefer and Eric Freiwald	February 18, 1972
565	18	"Paths of Courage (1)"	Arthur H. Nadel	Robert Schaefer and Eric Freiwald	February 25, 1972
566	19	"Paths of Courage (2)"	Arthur H. Nadel	Robert Schaefer and Eric Freiwald	March 3, 1972
567	20	"Circle of Life"	Arthur H. Nadel	Robert Schaefer and Eric Freiwald	March 10, 1972

==== Season 19 (1972–73) ====
No. overall	No. in season	Title	Directed by	Written by	Original release date
568	1	"Lightning"	Dick Moder	Robert Schaefer and Eric Freiwald	September 16, 1972
569	2	"The Doves of Santa Inez"	Dick Moder	Robert Schaefer and Eric Freiwald	September 23, 1972
570	3	"For Those Who Follow"	Dick Moder	Robert Schaefer and Eric Freiwald	September 30, 1972
571	4	"Scarecrow"	Jack B. Hively	Robert Schaefer and Eric Freiwald	October 14, 1972
572	5	"A Girl and a Boy (1)"	Arthur Nadel	R.A. Scott	October 21, 1972
573	6	"A Girl and a Boy (2)"	Arthur Nadel	R.A. Scott	October 28, 1972
574	7	"Deadly Surf"	Jack B. Hively	Robert Schaefer and Eric Freiwald	November 4, 1972
575	8	"Golden Eagle"	Dick Moder	Joanne Court	November 11, 1972
576	9	"A Taste of Freedom"	Gerald Schnitzer	Joanne Court and R.A. Scott	November 18, 1972
577	10	"Run to Nowhere (1)"	Ezra Stone	Robert Schaefer and Eric Freiwald	November 25, 1972
578	11	"Run to Nowhere (2)"	Ezra Stone	Robert Schaefer and Eric Freiwald	December 2, 1972
579	12	"Vigil of the Stork"	Jack B. Hively	Robert Schaefer and Eric Freiwald	December 9, 1972
580	13	"Dream Builder"	Hollingsworth Morse	Robert Schaefer and Eric Freiwald	December 16, 1972
581	14	"The Visitor"	Jack B. Hively	Robert Schaefer and Eric Freiwald	January 6, 1973
582	15	"Tell It to the Birds"	Gerald Schnitzer	Joanne Court	January 13, 1973
583	16	"Challenge of the Mountain (1)"	Jack Wrather	Robert Schaefer and Eric Freiwald	January 27, 1973
584	17	"Challenge of the Mountain (2)"	Jack Wrather	Robert Schaefer and Eric Freiwald	February 3, 1973
585	18	"Legend of the Coyote"	Christian Nyby	Joanne Court	February 10, 1973
586	19	"Horsenappers"	Ezra Stone	Story by : Joanne Court; Teleplay by : Robert Schaefer and Eric Freiwald	February 17, 1973
587	20	"A Joyous Sound (1)"	Jack Wrather	Robert Schaefer and Eric Freiwald	February 24, 1973
588	21	"A Joyous Sound (2)"	Jack Wrather	Robert Schaefer and Eric Freiwald	March 3, 1973
589	22	"A Joyous Sound (3)"	Jack Wrather	Robert Schaefer and Eric Freiwald	March 10, 1973
590	23	"Johnny Piper"	Ezra Stone	Robert Schaefer and Eric Freiwald	March 17, 1973
591	24	"The Dawning"	Jack B. Hively	Robert Schaefer and Eric Freiwald	March 24, 1973
