= Elliot Martin =

American theater producer (1924–2017)

- Born: Elliot Edwards Martin; February 25, 1924; Denver, Colorado, U.S.
- Died: May 21, 2017 (aged 93); Norwalk, Connecticut, U.S.
- Occupations: Theater producer, stage manager
- Spouse: Marjorie Cuesta (m. 1949; died 2014)
- Children: Linda Martin Giannini; Richard Martin
- Awards: Special Tony Award (1974); Theater Hall of Fame (2012); Laurence Olivier Award for Best Revival (2013)

Elliot Edwards Martin (February 25, 1924 – May 21, 2017) was an American theater producer and stage manager. Working largely as an independent producer, he was credited as a producer on 35 Broadway productions between 1962 and 2008, after working as a stage manager on about a dozen Broadway productions between 1953 and 1962. He also produced Off-Broadway productions, national tours, and summer stock. His Broadway productions included the original productions of Glengarry Glen Ross, Joe Turner's Come and Gone, and Shadowlands; revivals of Of Mice and Men and American Buffalo; and three productions of Eugene O'Neill's A Moon for the Misbegotten, the first of which (1973) received a Special Tony Award. From 1967 to 1971 he was the first director of the Center Theatre Group in Los Angeles, heading the organization that ran the Ahmanson Theatre and the Mark Taper Forum, and brought the Royal Shakespeare Company and Laurence Olivier's National Theatre to the Ahmanson. He was inducted into the Theater Hall of Fame in 2012.

== Early life ==
Martin was born in Denver, Colorado, on February 25, 1924, to Will H. Martin, a life insurance salesman, and the former Alma Harvey. As a teenager he worked summers as a cowboy, and at 17 he was given his own program on a local radio station as a singing cowboy, accompanying himself on guitar. He moved to New York after World War II.

== Career ==
=== Performer ===
Martin made his stage debut in the original London production of Oklahoma!, which opened at the Theatre Royal, Drury Lane, in April 1947. He played Fred and sang in the chorus. The company also included the singer and actress Marjorie Cuesta, whom he married in 1949. The production ran for more than 1,500 performances, at the time the longest run in the theater's history. He and Cuesta also toured in Rodgers and Hammerstein's Allegro. His only Broadway performing role was in the musical Texas, Li'l Darlin' (1949–1950).

=== Stage manager ===
Martin began working backstage with the Theatre Guild as a production assistant on its revival of Saint Joan (1951) and as stage manager on Guild productions including Home Is the Hero (1954), A Majority of One (1959), and The Unsinkable Molly Brown (1960). In the 1950s he also worked summers at the Westport Country Playhouse, where he stage-managed many of its early-1950s productions and often ran the theater day to day. His first Broadway stage-management job was At Home with Ethel Waters (1953).

He worked as stage manager for the director José Quintero on six Broadway productions between 1953 and 1962, including the original production of O'Neill's Long Day's Journey into Night (1956), on which he was production stage manager.

=== Producer ===
In the summer of 1962 Martin produced a touring production of Sumner Arthur Long's comedy Cradle and All, which other producers had turned down. Starring Paul Ford and Maureen O'Sullivan, it played summer theaters including the Cape Playhouse and the Westport Country Playhouse. Retitled Never Too Late and directed by George Abbott, it opened on Broadway at the Playhouse Theatre on November 27, 1962, and ran until April 24, 1965, for 1,007 performances. His first Broadway producing credit was Seidman and Son (1962), produced by Theatre Guild Productions in association with Martin. He followed Never Too Late with Nobody Loves an Albatross (1963) starring Robert Preston and a revival of Dinner at Eight (1966) directed by Tyrone Guthrie.

==== Center Theatre Group ====
Dorothy Chandler recruited Martin to the Los Angeles Music Center as the first director of the Center Theatre Group, a management post heading the organization that ran the Ahmanson and Forum theaters. His appointment was announced in December 1966. He led the group from 1967 to 1971. He opened the group's first season at the Ahmanson on September 12, 1967, with the American premiere of O'Neill's More Stately Mansions, directed by Quintero and starring Ingrid Bergman and Colleen Dewhurst. Martin and Quintero had visited Bergman in France in April 1967 to discuss the role, and she accepted. When the theater's board questioned whether her name would sell tickets, Martin and Quintero stood firm. It was her first appearance on the American stage in more than twenty years. The production then transferred to Broadway. He brought the Royal Shakespeare Company to the Ahmanson for a six-week engagement in January and February 1968 with As You Like It and The Taming of the Shrew, and the company returned the following year. In 1970 he persuaded Laurence Olivier to bring the National Theatre to the Ahmanson for its first engagement in the United States, presenting The Beaux' Stratagem and Olivier's production of Three Sisters. His seasons also included Greer Garson in Captain Brassbound's Conversion. When he left, Robert Fryer succeeded him.

==== O'Neill and Quintero ====
Martin produced three more productions directed by Quintero. The 1973 revival of A Moon for the Misbegotten, starring Jason Robards, Dewhurst, and Ed Flanders, ran at the Morosco Theatre from December 29, 1973, to November 17, 1974. Dewhurst, Flanders, and Quintero won Tony Awards, and the production received a special Tony Award "for an outstanding dramatic revival of an American classic." On opening night Martin read the New York Times review, a rave, aloud to the company and their guests. He then produced the Broadway revival of O'Neill's A Touch of the Poet, starring Robards and directed by Quintero, at the Helen Hayes Theatre in 1977. Reviewing the 1977–78 season, Otis L. Guernsey Jr. wrote that Martin "distinguished himself with a benchmark production" of the play. In 1980 he produced the original Broadway production of Tennessee Williams's Clothes for a Summer Hotel, about F. Scott and Zelda Fitzgerald, starring Geraldine Page and Kenneth Haigh and directed by Quintero, at the Cort Theatre. It opened on March 26, 1980, and was the last of Williams's plays to premiere on Broadway. Martin produced A Moon for the Misbegotten twice more on Broadway: in 2000, when Roy Dotrice won the Tony Award for Best Featured Actor in a Play as Phil Hogan, and in 2007.

His last production was a 2012 revival of Long Day's Journey into Night in London, starring David Suchet and Laurie Metcalf, 56 years after he stage-managed the play's Broadway premiere. It won the Laurence Olivier Award for Best Revival.

==== Mamet, Wilson, and other productions ====
Martin produced the Broadway revival of David Mamet's American Buffalo, starring Al Pacino and directed by Arvin Brown, at the Booth Theatre from 1983 to 1984. The production originated at the Long Wharf Theatre and was nominated for the Tony Award for Best Reproduction. He produced the play again on Broadway in 2008.

He produced the original Broadway production of Mamet's Glengarry Glen Ross, starring Joe Mantegna, Robert Prosky, and J. T. Walsh and directed by Gregory Mosher, at the John Golden Theatre from March 25, 1984, to February 17, 1985. The play won the 1984 Pulitzer Prize for Drama, and Mantegna won the Tony Award for Best Featured Actor in a Play. Martin also produced its national tour (1985–1986).

He produced the original Broadway production of August Wilson's Joe Turner's Come and Gone, directed by Lloyd Richards, at the Ethel Barrymore Theatre in 1988, in association with Yale Repertory Theatre. It was nominated for the Tony Award for Best Play, and L. Scott Caldwell won the Tony Award for Best Featured Actress in a Play.

Martin produced four plays starring Rex Harrison: Luigi Pirandello's Emperor Henry IV (1973), which toured before opening on Broadway; George Bernard Shaw's Caesar and Cleopatra (1977); William Douglas Home's The Kingfisher (1978) directed by Lindsay Anderson; and W. Somerset Maugham's The Circle (1989). During The Kingfisher, when Claudette Colbert was ill, Martin had flowers sent to her in Harrison's name at the production's expense. Harrison played in The Circle until May 11, 1990, a week before its scheduled closing, and died of cancer on June 2. Martin said, "He died with his boots on, no question about it."

His other Broadway productions included Of Mice and Men (1974) starring James Earl Jones, Tom Stoppard's Dirty Linen and New-Found-Land (1977), Edward Sheehan's Kingdoms (1981) starring Roy Dotrice as Pope Pius VII, Beth Henley's The Wake of Jamey Foster (1982), Lanford Wilson's Angels Fall (1983), Arsenic and Old Lace (1986), William Nicholson's Shadowlands (1990) for which Nigel Hawthorne won the Tony Award for Best Actor in a Play, She Loves Me (1993), and I'm Not Rappaport (2002). Off-Broadway he produced Mark Medoff's When You Comin' Back, Red Ryder? (1973) and the comedy Breaking Legs (1991). With James M. Nederlander and Michael Frazier he also produced the national tour of Steel Magnolias (1989).

As a producer Martin worked repeatedly with The Shubert Organization on Angels Fall, Glengarry Glen Ross, and The Circle. He also co-produced with James M. Nederlander on Abelard and Heloise (1971), Caesar and Cleopatra (1977), Arsenic and Old Lace (1986), Shadowlands (1990), and the 1993 revival of She Loves Me. Nederlander's son, James L. Nederlander, was among the producers of his 2007 A Moon for the Misbegotten. His productions had played the Nederlander family's Detroit theaters since the early 1960s: he was production stage manager when Great Day in the Morning tried out at the Shubert Theatre in March 1962, and his touring company of Never Too Late played the Fisher Theatre in 1964.

== Awards and honors ==
The 1973 revival of A Moon for the Misbegotten, which Martin produced, received a special Tony Award in 1974. As a producer he received nine competitive Tony Award nominations, in addition to the 1974 special award, and three Drama Desk Award nominations. These and his other production awards are listed below. Productions he produced received 44 Tony Award nominations and won eight competitive Tony Awards. (Note: Counted from the Internet Broadway Database's page for each of his 35 Broadway productions. IBDB lists the two 1988 nominations of Kimberleigh Aarn and Kimberly Scott for Best Featured Actress in a Play (Joe Turner's Come and Gone) in a single row, so its pages show 43 rows. The eight wins exclude the 1974 special award.) He was elected to the Theater Hall of Fame in 2011 and inducted on January 30, 2012. On his induction, the Hall of Fame's executive producer, Terry Hodge Taylor, called him "the last of the great gentlemen producers." He was a lifetime member of The Players and a member of The Broadway League for 55 years.

=== Awards and nominations ===
The table lists production awards for productions Martin produced. Awards to individual performers, writers, directors, and designers are not included.

| Year | Award | Category | Production | Result | Ref. |
|---|---|---|---|---|---|
| 1974 | Tony Award | Special Tony Award | A Moon for the Misbegotten | Won | |
| 1978 | Tony Award | Most Innovative Production of a Revival | A Touch of the Poet | Nominated | |
| 1983 | Tony Award | Best Play | Angels Fall | Nominated | |
| 1984 | Tony Award | Best Play | Glengarry Glen Ross | Nominated | |
| 1984 | Tony Award | Best Reproduction | American Buffalo | Nominated | |
| 1984 | Drama Desk Award | Outstanding New Play | Glengarry Glen Ross | Nominated | |
| 1988 | Tony Award | Best Play | Joe Turner's Come and Gone | Nominated | |
| 1988 | Drama Desk Award | Outstanding New Play | Joe Turner's Come and Gone | Nominated | |
| 1990 | Tony Award | Best Revival | The Circle | Nominated | |
| 1991 | Tony Award | Best Play | Shadowlands | Nominated | |
| 1994 | Tony Award | Best Revival of a Musical | She Loves Me | Nominated | |
| 2000 | Tony Award | Best Revival of a Play | A Moon for the Misbegotten | Nominated | |
| 2000 | Drama Desk Award | Outstanding Revival of a Play | A Moon for the Misbegotten | Nominated | |
| 2007 | Laurence Olivier Award | Best Revival | A Moon for the Misbegotten (Old Vic) | Nominated | |
| 2013 | Laurence Olivier Award | Best Revival | Long Day's Journey into Night (Apollo Theatre) (Note: The Society of London Theatre's listing names no producers; Martin's producer credit is from Playbill.) | Won | |

== Personal life and death ==
Martin married Marjorie Cuesta in 1949. Cuesta, a singer and actress credited in the theater as Marjorie Martin, worked closely with him throughout his producing career. She was production associate on More Stately Mansions (1967) and Dirty Linen and New-Found-Land (1977); associate producer of the Off-Broadway When You Comin' Back, Red Ryder? (1973) and of Arsenic and Old Lace (1986); and casting director for most of his productions from 1977 to 2008, including Glengarry Glen Ross and Shadowlands. They were married for 65 years, until her death in 2014, and had a daughter, Linda Martin Giannini, and a son, Richard Martin. Martin died in Norwalk, Connecticut, on May 21, 2017, at the age of 93. Broadway theaters dimmed their marquee lights in his memory on June 2, 2017.

His papers, including production records, scripts, and photographs from 1947 to 2010, were given to the Harvard Theatre Collection at Houghton Library in 2017.
