= The Great Man's Whiskers =

- Genre: Drama
- Written by: John Paxton
- Directed by: Philip Leacock
- Starring: Dean Jones; Ann Sothern; Dennis Weaver; John McGiver
- Music by: Earl Robinson
- Country of origin: United States
- Original language: English

Production
- Producer: Adrian Scott
- Cinematography: John F. Warren
- Editor: John Elias
- Running time: 74 minutes
- Production company: Universal Television

Original release
- Network: NBC
- Release: May 2, 1972

The Great Man's Whiskers is a 1972 American made-for-television drama film about Abraham Lincoln, directed by Philip Leacock. It was based on a play by Adrian Scott. The film featured a number of well known theatre and television character actors. Harve Presnell, featured as a ballad singer in the film, sings "The Wilderness Man" written by Earl Robinson with lyrics by Yip Harburg. Isabel Sanford sings "Things Go Bump in the Night" also written by Robinson and Harburg. This was Mr. Harburg's last work.

== Plot ==
Ten-year-old girl Elizabeth Cooper encourages Abraham Lincoln to grow a beard. Lincoln's inaugural journey, by train, from Illinois to Washington, D.C. takes him through New York state. The journey includes a stop in Elizabeth's hometown of Westfield, New York. Lincoln, now with a full beard, takes the opportunity to meet the young girl.

The screenplay was inspired by the true story of Grace Bedell, who wrote Lincoln just before his election to the presidency in 1860.

== Cast ==
- Dean Jones as James E. Cooper
- Cindy Eilbacher as Elizabeth Cooper
- Ann Sothern as Aunt Margaret Bancroft
- Dennis Weaver as Abraham Lincoln
- John McGiver as Andrew Hogan
- Harve Presnell as Ballad Singer
- John Hillerman as Major Underwood
- Isabel Sanford as Ella
- Charles Lane as Philbrick

== Production ==
In 1947, it was announced Adrian Scott would make his directorial debut with an adaptation of his play The Great Man's Whiskers. John Paxton would produce. However, RKO fired Scott because of the blacklist. For a time, it seemed RKO would still complete the project but the studio eventually dropped it.

The screenplay by John Paxton was eventually directed by Philip Leacock at Universal City Studios in 1969. The film aired on NBC as a “TV Movie of the Week” on May 2, 1972, and was rebroadcast on February 13, 1973.

The Los Angeles Times called it "foolish and belaboured."
