= Never Too Late (play) =

1962 play by Sumner Arthur Long

- 1962 Playbill cover
- Original language: English
- Written by: Sumner Arthur Long
- Characters: Harry Lambert; Edith Lambert; Kate Clinton; Charlie Clinton; Grace Kimbrough; James Kimbrough
- Genre: Comedy
- Setting: The living room of the Lambert home in Calverton, Massachusetts.

Premiere
- Date: 27 November 1962
- Place: Playhouse Theatre

Never Too Late is a 1962 Broadway play by Sumner Arthur Long.

Never Too Late starred Paul Ford and Maureen O'Sullivan as Harry and Edith Lambert, a middle-aged couple about to become parents once again. Starring as the couple's adult daughter Kate and her husband Charlie Clinton were Fran Sharon and Orson Bean, as well as Leona Maricle and House Jameson as Grace and James Kimbrough.

== Production ==
Director George Abbott recalled John Wharton gave him the script called Cradle and All. Abbott wrote, "It was underdeveloped, but it had good characters and a comic idea, and I thought I saw just what should be done to make it a hit. I was right; that's exactly what it became under the title, Never Too Late."

Never Too Late originally opened at the Playhouse Theatre in New York City on November 27, 1962. The play, directed by Abbott and produced by Elliot Martin and Daniel Hollywood, ran for a total of 1,007 performances until its end on April 24, 1965.

In his book on Broadway The Season, William Goldman gave the play's success as an example of a freak success that can happen due to good reviews:

Paul Ford has been Paul Ford for a million years, always the same, always wonderful. But on the night that Never Too Late opened, the critics decided not to give the usual Paul Ford notice: “Mr. Ford struggles nobly with his material, but it is a losing battle.” That night it’s hats in the air and a 1,000-performance run and fortunes for everybody. There is simply no conceivable way of knowing when this contagion will strike the boys on the aisle. But one of the reasons that so many inconceivable plays get to Broadway is that when they're dying out of town they dream of the Never Too Lates and come on in."

== Film ==
A film version based on the play was released in November 1965 with Ford and O’Sullivan reprising their Broadway roles.

== Awards and nominations ==
=== Original Broadway production ===
Year	Award ceremony	Category	Nominee	Result
1963	Tony Award	Best Performance by a Leading Actor in a Play	Paul Ford	Nominated
1963	Tony Award	Best Direction of a Play	George Abbott	Nominated
