= Joan LaCour Scott =

American screenwriter (1921-2012)

Joan Patricia LaCour
- Born: May 21, 1921; Long Branch, New Jersey, United States
- Died: June 19, 2012 (aged 91); Woodland, California, United States
- Spouse(s): Bill O'Brien Adrian Scott (m. 1955)

Joan LaCour Scott (born Joan Patricia LaCour; May 21, 1921 – June 19, 2012) was an American trade union activist and screenwriter, who wrote for Lassie, Have Gun – Will Travel, Surfside 6, The Waltons, The Adventures of Robin Hood, and Lancelot.

== Early life ==
Joan Patricia LaCour was born in Long Branch, New Jersey on May 21, 1921. Her father left home when she was two and her mother worked as a vaudeville performer to support her family. As young girls, she and her twin sister Jean appeared on the stage as the LaCour Sisters.

In 1933, her family decided to move to California, where LaCour's mother hoped for fame for her daughters. Their plan was to travel south and then west. In Atlanta, LaCour's grandfather jumped from a hotel window in a suicide attempt. After his eventual death, the family continued their trip west, which eventually took six months. They arrived in Hollywood in 1934, when she was thirteen. Her mother worked for the Federal Theater Project.

LaCour graduated from Hollywood High in 1937. During World War II, LaCour worked as a secretary in a department of RCA that was developing radar. She married a man she later identified by the pseudonym Bill O'Brien. O'Brien was drafted and Joan worked in a hospital in Salem, Massachusetts for the duration of the war. O'Brien grew abusive and went MIA. When he returned, he was transferred from Boston to New York, but his drinking worsened, he became physically abusive, and she left him and returned to her family in California, eventually obtaining a divorce.

== Trade unionism and Communist Party ==
Newly single in Hollywood, in 1946, LaCour joined the Hollywood Independent Citizens Committee of the Arts, Sciences, and Professions (HICCASP) controlled by the CPUSA making it the West Coast's largest Communist front. Ronald Reagan, who was providing information to the FBI about fellow actors, joined HICCASP at the same time, part of a broader struggle over the political orientation and future of the organization.

HICCASP Executive Director George Pepper encouraged LaCour to join the Communist Party. LaCour claimed that she was a Communist Party member for only six weeks, quitting when she was told she had to choose between the party and her therapist. Other accounts claim that LaCour was kicked out of the Communist Party because she was in therapy with psychologist Phil Cohen, who was known for encouraging clients to inform.

LaCour met future husband Adrian Scott, when she was working as the stage manager of a mass meeting in support of the Hollywood Ten. They married in 1955.

== The Blacklist ==
With Adrian Scott unemployable because of the blacklist, LaCour began to seek work, initially as his front. She took his work to story conferences, managed revisions, and took notes so that he could rewrite at home. She wrote under a pseudonym, Joanne Court. These were economically difficult years for the couple, although Joan credited them with teaching her how to be a writer.

But in the early 1950s, while she was employed as executive secretary of the Television Writers of America union, a Hollywood columnist wrote an attack piece alleging that Scott was part of a plot to get Communist propaganda into TV scripts. She was blacklisted and called to testify before the House committee investigating subversives in the movie and television industries.

Unlike other blacklisted writers and producers, the Scotts could not seek work in Europe or Mexico. For Joan and Adrian Scott, caring for their mentally ill adopted son meant that relocation to Europe was not possible. As Adrian wrote in a letter to a friend, "The problem [to taking a job in France] was Mike – our Mike. You may remember that he was on his way to being a bona fide delinquent during the period we lived in Hollywood. There were thefts, endless hooky playing, skirmishes with the police and finally a court appearance. In the past two years all this has stopped . . . . By taking him abroad, Joan and I felt convinced that we would undo all the good work that has been done so far.

Producer Hannah Weinstein, who had fled Hollywood when the blacklist began, was hiring blacklisted writers for work with her new production company, Sapphire Films, in England. Adrian wrote a letter to Weinstein, "You will not accuse me of nepotism, I know, if I recommend my wife, Joan, who though new to TV has just cracked through with some excellent scripts."

Over the next few years, the Scotts contributed more than a dozen scripts to Sapphire Productions' The Adventures of Robin Hood and Lancelot.

LaCour died at the age of 91, in Woodland, California, on June 19, 2012.

== Papers ==
Joan and Adrian Scott's papers can be found at the American Heritage Center in Laramie, Wyoming. http://www.uwyo.edu/ahc/
