= Creeps by Night =

American old-time radio horror program

- Country of origin: United States
- Language: English
- Syndicates: Blue Network
- Starring: Boris Karloff
- Written by: Gene Wang; Alonzo Dean Cole; Ruth Fenisong
- Directed by: Dave Drummond
- Produced by: Robert Maxwell
- Original release: February 15 – August 15, 1944

Creeps by Night is an American old-time radio horror program. It was broadcast on the Blue Network February 15, 1944 - August 15, 1944.

== Format ==
Using an anthology series format, Creeps by Night presented stories of suspense and mystery, described in a newspaper brief as "subtle, psychological chillers". The first episode, "The Voice of Death", dealt with a widow who was made to commit murders after hearing the voice of her dead husband.

On June 3, 1944, a columnist in the publication Showmen's Trade Review wrote about another episode:

We were literally scared out of our skin the other evening while listening to a half-hour broadcast of "The Strange Burial of Alexander Jordan," one in the Blue Network's horror series, Creeps by Night. Star of the piece was Edmund Gwenn. Still thinking about it long after the station break, we couldn't help but ponder over the fact that radio has successfully adapted any number of short stories to the broadcasting medium...

A review in the trade publication Variety described the same episode as "a suspenseful dramatization", adding "Script was well written and acted, although ending was fairly obvious."

== Personnel ==
Creeps by Night provided Boris Karloff with his first full-time role on a radio program, as he was host and narrator for the show when it was launched. However, when production of the show moved from the West Coast to New York City, Karloff was dropped and replaced by a new host, "Dr. X", effective May 23, 1944. The name of the actor who played "Dr. X" was unknown not only to the listening audience but also to other members of the cast. Variety's reviewer called the "Dr. X" development an "obvious attempt to build up audience interest in a narrator who has little or no public appeal when appearing under his own name."

Others frequently heard in the program included Abby Lewis, Gregory Morton, Everett Sloane, Jackson Beck, Ed Begley, Mary Patton, and Juano Hernandez.

Writers for the program were Gene Wang, Alonzo Dean Cole and Ruth Fenisong. Robert Maxwell was the producer, and Dave Drummond was the director.
