= Never Too Late (1965 film) =

1965 film by Bud Yorkin

- Directed by: Bud Yorkin
- Screenplay by: Sumner Arthur Long
- Based on: Never Too Late (1962 play) by Sumner Arthur Long
- Produced by: Norman Lear
- Starring: Paul Ford; Connie Stevens; Maureen O'Sullivan; Jim Hutton
- Cinematography: Philip H. Lathrop
- Edited by: William H. Ziegler
- Music by: David Rose
- Production company: Tandem Productions
- Distributed by: Warner Bros. Pictures
- Release date: November 4, 1965
- Running time: 105 minutes
- Country: United States
- Language: English
- Box office: $2.1 million (est. US/Canada rentals)

Never Too Late is a 1965 comedic feature film directed by Bud Yorkin and produced by Norman Lear. It stars 54-year-old Maureen O'Sullivan as the wife of a businessman (played by 64-year old Paul Ford) who discovers, after 25 years of marriage, that she is to become a mother for the second time. Adding to the complications is the fact that their married daughter (Connie Stevens) and her husband (Jim Hutton) live with them.

== Plot ==
Harry Lambert is a New England lumber company executive in a humdrum life with his wife Edith. He feels his life has grown stale since his recent defeat in an election for town mayor. Adding to his frustrations, the mayor who defeated him in the election is a neighbour. His adult daughter Kate is of little or no help to anybody; she and her husband Charlie live with Harry and Edith, and Charlie lives a freeloader's life, working at the lumber company.

Bothered by unexplained fatigue, Edith is persuaded by her friend Grace (Jane Wyatt) to go see a doctor. Edith learns she is pregnant. Her daughter Kate wishes she were also pregnant. Kate begins pressuring her husband Charlie to get her pregnant, without success.

Harry doesn't want to be a father again at his age; in his sixties, he worries that he will be in his eighties when the child graduates from college, leaving him embarrassed and feeling foolish. He also complains about Edith's spending, particularly after a misjudged prank by Charlie and himself insulting the mayor leads to their losing a lumber supply contract for a new stadium.

Despite his many complaints, Harry is genuinely taken aback when Edith announces she is leaving him to move to Boston and have the baby by herself. Harry pursues Edith to bring her back, while Charlie finally comes through by winning back the stadium contract.

== Cast ==
- Paul Ford as Harry Lambert
- Maureen O'Sullivan as Edith Lambert
- Connie Stevens as Kate Clinton
- Jim Hutton as Charlie Clinton
- Jane Wyatt as Grace Kimbrough
- Henry Jones as Dr. James Kimbrough
- Lloyd Nolan as Mayor Crane

additional uncredited cast members included:

- Gino Cappelletti (the professional football player) as Lumberyard Man
- Tommy Farrell as Ainsley
- Pamelyn Ferdin as Little Girl in Elevator
- Timothy Hutton as Boy Running to His Daddy
- Barbara Kelley as Woman in Elevator
- Richmond Shepard as Indian Chief

== Production ==
The film is based on the 1962 Broadway play of the same name by Sumner Arthur Long which also starred Ford and O'Sullivan. The play ran for a total of 1,007 performances until its end in 1965, shortly before its Technicolor motion picture release.

Bob Crane auditioned for the role that went to Jim Hutton.

It was filmed in Concord, Massachusetts, in 1964 and 1965.

== Release ==
According to the November 10, 1965, edition of The New York Times, the film was playing at Radio City Music Hall the previous evening, on the night of the Northeast blackout of 1965.

FilmInk called it "very old time-y".

== See also ==
- List of American films of 1965
