= Robert Maxwell (producer) =

American radio and television producer, screenwriter

- Born: Robert Maxwell Joffe; January 31, 1908; Brooklyn, New York
- Died: February 3, 1971 (aged 63); Toronto, Ontario, Canada
- Other names: Robert Joffe Maxwell; Robert J. Maxwell; Robert Maxwell; Bob Maxwell; Richard Fielding; Claire Kennedy
- Occupations: Radio and television producer, screenwriter
- Spouses: Jessica Fielding Maxwell; Dusty Bruce Maxwell; Barbara Maxwell

Robert Maxwell Joffe (January 31, 1908 – February 3, 1971) was an American radio and television producer, screenwriter, and entertainment executive. He was one of the producers (and a writer and director) of The Adventures of Superman radio show and a producer of several TV series, including the early episodes of both Adventures of Superman (1951–1954) and Lassie (1954–1957; executive producer 1957–1958). Maxwell acquired the rights to Lassie in 1953 for $2,000 and sold the popular television program starring the collie to Jack Wrather in 1956 for a reported $3.5 million.

He also was the producer of Creeps by Night (1944) on the Blue Network.

He also wrote episodes of the Superman radio and TV series as Richard Fielding (a pseudonym that he shared with fellow producers Whitney Ellsworth and Maxwell's then wife, Jessica Fielding Maxwell).

Many early episodes of Lassie, as well as episodes of National Velvet, were written by Robert Maxwell under the pseudonym Claire Kennedy.

At the time of his death in Toronto, Canada, he was married to Barbara Maxwell and had two sons.
