= Eric Freiwald =

Eric Freiwald (September 24, 1927 – January 29, 2010) was an American TV writer scripting the daytime television serial, The Young and the Restless.

== Life and career ==
From the mid-1950s to 1984 with partner Robert Schaefer, he wrote for such shows as The Gene Autry Show, The Adventures of Kit Carson, Tales of the Texas Rangers, Maverick, Whirlybirds, Texas John Slaughter, Zorro, 77 Sunset Strip, The Adventures of Wild Bill Hickok, Buffalo Bill, Jr., The Adventures of Champion and many others.

They also wrote 188 episodes of Lassie and, between 1957 and 1965, wrote comic book adaptations of TV shows and movies for Western Publishing.

His writing partner was his daughter Linda Schreiber. They both lived in Prescott Valley, Arizona.

== Death ==
Freiwald died on January 29, 2010, at his home in Prescott, Arizona of natural causes.

== Positions held ==
- The Young and the Restless - Script writer (1980 – December 2007; April 2, 2008 – February, 8, 2010)

== Awards and nominations ==
Daytime Emmy Awards

- 4 Wins (1992, 1997, 2000, 2006; Best Writing; The Young and the Restless)
- NOMINATIONS (1986–1987, 1990–1995, 1997–2001, 2003–2006; Best Writing; Y&R)

Writers Guild of America Award

- 2 WINS (2001 & 2005 season; The Young and the Restless)
- 4 NOMINATIONS (1999, 2001, 2005–2006 season; The Young and the Restless)
