= Adrian Scott =

American film producer (1911–1972)

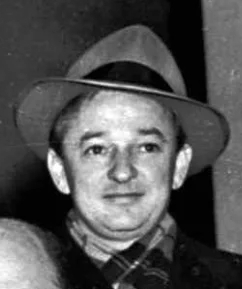
- Scott in 1948
- Born: Robert Adrian Scott; February 6, 1911; Arlington, New Jersey
- Died: December 25, 1972 (aged 61); Sherman Oaks, California
- Occupations: Screenwriter, film producer
- Spouses: Anne Shirley (m. 1945; div. 1948) Joan LaCour Scott (m. 1955)
- Relatives: Allan Scott (brother); Pippa Scott (niece)

Robert Adrian Scott (February 6, 1911 – December 25, 1972) was an American screenwriter and film producer. He was one of the Hollywood Ten and later blacklisted by the Hollywood movie studio bosses.

== Life and career ==
=== Early life ===
Scott was born in Arlington, New Jersey, the son of successful Irish Catholic parents — his father worked in middle management for the New York Telephone Company. Arlington was one of the centers of the American textile industry, a key site in the history of industrial capitalism and a hotbed of radical labor agitation. Arlington is 12 miles south of Paterson, where the 1913 strike of 25,000 silk workers brought together socialists, Wobblies, and Greenwich Village intellectuals. In 1926, when Scott was 15, 20,000 textile workers in nearby Passaic, New Jersey, closed down the mills.

Scott's older brother Allan was a playwright (and later screenwriter), whose comedy Goodbye Again ran on Broadway for most of 1933.

Adrian's college yearbook in Amherst College described him: "Hat cocked back at a rakish angle, cigar in the corner of his mouth, his fingers playing nimbly over the typewriter keys, the inimitable R.A.L. Scott." Scott graduated from Amherst in 1934. He was a film critic and associate editor of Stage magazine from 1936 through 1938. He moved to Hollywood, California, in 1939.

=== Screenwriter ===
Scott broke into Hollywood as a screenwriter. He worked on the script for Keeping Company (1940) at MGM, We Go Fast (1941) at 20th Century Fox, and The Parson of Panamint (1941) at Paramount. Scott wrote Mr. Lucky (1943) at RKO, which was a hit.

=== Producer ===
RKO signed Scott to work as a producer. His first credit in that capacity was My Pal Wolf (1944). He went on to produce Murder, My Sweet (1944), an adaptation of Farewell My Lovely by Raymond Chandler by John Paxton that was directed by Edward Dmytryk. It was a critical and commercial success. The cast included Dick Powell, who revitalized his career in the role of Philip Marlowe, and Anne Shirley, whom Scott married. Scott, Dmytryk, Powell, and Paxton reunited on Cornered (1945). Scott then produced Deadline at Dawn (1946), the only feature film directed by Harold Clurman. Dmytryk, Paxton, and he reunited on So Well Remembered (1947) shot in England. More successful was Crossfire (1947), another collaboration among the three men. Crossfire was nominated for the Academy Award for Best Picture and was a popular success.

Scott produced The Boy with Green Hair (1948), directed by Joseph Losey, which was a box-office flop. He is credited on the script for Miss Susie Slagle's (1946) at Paramount.

=== Blacklisting ===
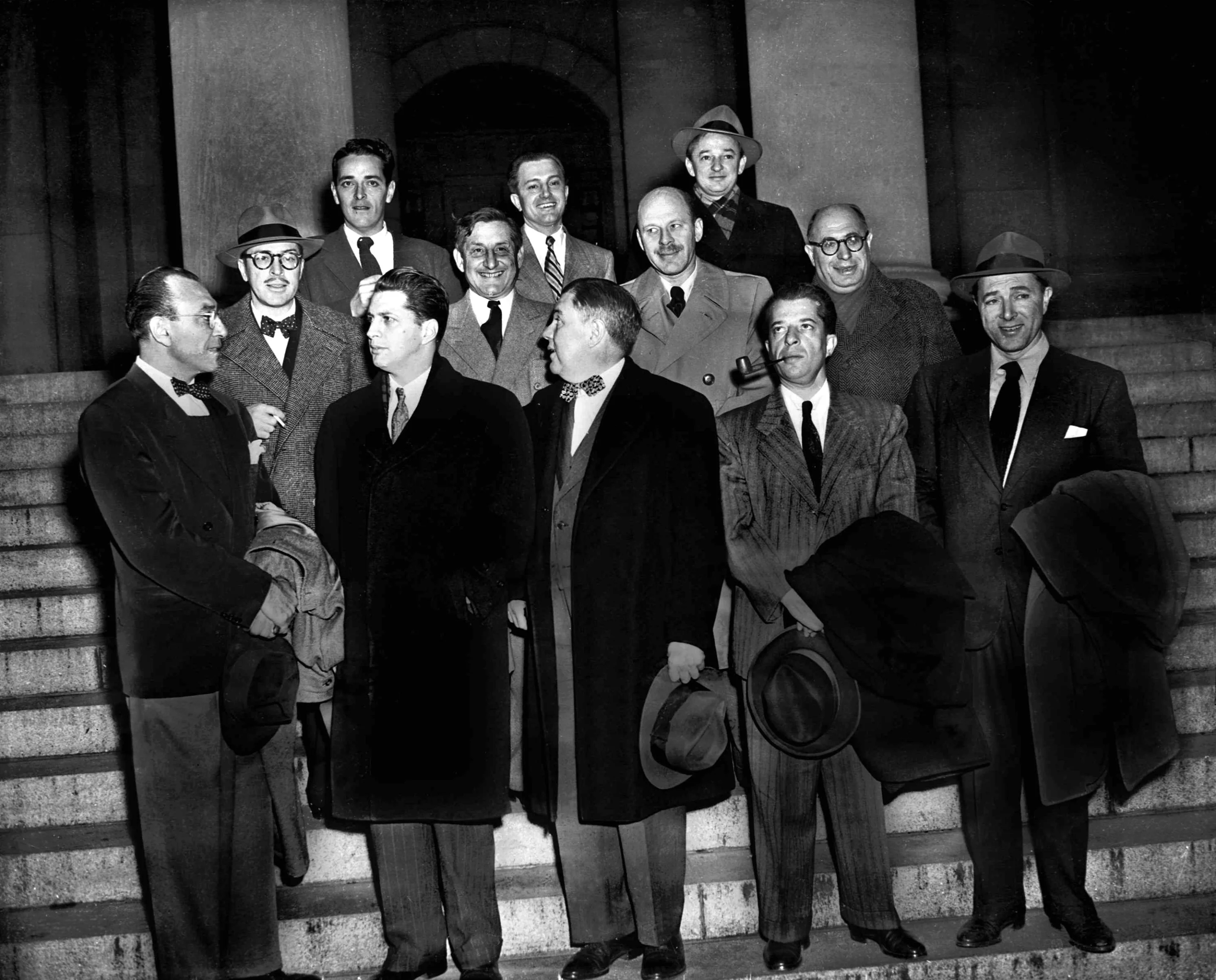
"The Hollywood Ten" stand with their attorneys outside district court in Washington, D.C. before arraignment on contempt of Congress charges. The ten were charged for refusing to cooperate with the House Un-American Activities Committee. (Front row, L-R): Herbert Biberman, attorney Martin Popper, attorney Robert W. Kenny, Albert Maltz and Lester Cole. (Second row, L-R): Dalton Trumbo, John Howard Lawson, Alvah Bessie and Samuel Ornitz. (Top row, L-R): Ring Lardner Jr., Edward Dmytryk and Adrian Scott.

Scott joined the Communist Party USA in 1944. In October 1947, Scott was called to testify during the House Committee on Un-American Activities hearings on Hollywood, but as did nine others, refused to testify. RKO fired him on October 29, 1947, for refusing to answer questions.

For the first year of the blacklist, he returned to journalism, contributing to the London journal Cine-Technician. He was sentenced to prison along with the other members of the Hollywood Ten. Edward Dmytryk, another of the Hollywood Ten, chose to become a 'friendly' witness and testified before the HUAC in 1951 that Scott pressured him to put communist propaganda in his films.

In 1955, Scott published an essay titled "Blacklist: The Liberal's Straightjacket and Its Effect on Content" in Hollywood Review.

From 1954 to 1961, Scott made a living writing for television. These shows included The Adventures of Robin Hood and The Adventures of Sir Lancelot. He provided the story for Conspiracy of Hearts (1960) under a pseudonym.

He moved to England in 1961.

In 1963, MGM-British hired Scott as a production executive, effectively ending his blacklisting.

=== Later career ===
Scott attempted to make a return to feature-film production in 1967 by producing a new adaptation of Monsieur Lecoq; the film was never finished. Film stills featuring the movie's actress Julie Newmar were featured in the September 1969 edition of Playboy.

Shortly before his death, Scott made a television adaptation of The Great Man's Whiskers and was credited with his legal name.

== Personal life ==
Scott was married to actress Anne Shirley, who subsequently married another screenwriter, Charles Lederer, nephew of Marion Davies. He later married Joan Scott (née LaCour), fellow screenwriter and producer. Joan sometimes served as Adrian's front when he was unable to publish under his own name, and later the surname LaCour was used by both when writing in Hollywood.

Adrian was the brother of screenwriter Allan Scott, who is the father of actress Pippa Scott. Adrian Scott died from lung cancer in 1972 in Sherman Oaks, California.

== Papers ==
Joan and Adrian Scott's papers can be found at the American Heritage Center in Laramie, Wyoming.
