= Sumner Arthur Long =

American dramatist

- Born: March 31, 1921; Boston, Massachusetts, U.S.
- Died: January 6, 1993 (aged 71); Los Angeles, California, U.S.
- Occupations: Playwright, screenwriter, author
- Spouse: Beulah
- Children: 2
- Writing career
- Genre: Comedy
- Notable work: Never Too Late

Sumner Arthur Long (31 March 1921 – 6 January 1993) was an American playwright, screenwriter, and author.

He wrote the comedy play Never Too Late. A film adaptation was released in 1965.

Long began writing for television in 1951, and wrote many episodes of Lassie, Father Knows Best, The Danny Thomas Show, The Many Loves of Dobie Gillis, and The Donna Reed Show. He also wrote Waldo, an unsold television pilot that aired as an episode of the 1960 anthology series New Comedy Showcase.
