= Dwight Hauser =

American actor

- Born: Dwight Arthur Hauser; July 4, 1911; Idaho, U.S.
- Died: January 18, 1969 (aged 57); Lake Sherwood, California, U.S.
- Spouse: Geraldine T. Hauser (? – January 18, 1969; his death)
- Children: 4, including Wings
- Relatives: Cole Hauser (grandson)

Dwight Arthur Hauser (July 4, 1911 – January 18, 1969) was an American film screenwriter, actor, and film producer, also the father of actors Wings Hauser and Erich Hauser and grandfather of actor Cole Hauser.

He was blacklisted as a Communist in the McCarthy Era.

== Death ==
Hauser died on January 18, 1969, in Lake Sherwood, California, at the age of 57.

== Filmography ==
=== Writer ===
- Disneyland (1961–1964) (TV series) (3 episodes)
  - Nikki, Wild Dog of the North: Part 1 (1964) TV Episode (writer)
  - Nikki, Wild Dog of the North: Part 2 (1964) TV Episode (writer)
  - A Fire Called Jeremiah (1961) TV Episode
- The Legend of Lobo (1962)Disney
- People and Places (1962) (TV series) (unknown episodes)
- Nikki, Wild Dog of the North (1961)
- Wales (1958) (short film)
- Nature's Strangest Creatures (1959) (narrative)
- Ama Girls (1958) Academy Award for Walt Disney
- Lapland (1957)
- Portugal (1957/I)

Lassie (TV Series) (writer - 4 episodes, 1962 - 1963) (teleplay - 1 episode, 1961) Weasel Warfare (1963) ... (writer) Gentle Savage (1962) ... (writer) Quick Brown Fox (1962) ... (writer) The Musher (1962) ... (writer) The Badger Game (1961) ... (teleplay)
