= Lassie (1954 TV series) =

American television series (1954–1973)

- Title screen of Lassie (seasons 1–4)
- Also known as: Jeff's Collie (episodes 1–116); Timmy & Lassie (episodes 117–352)
- Genre: Family; Adventure/Drama
- Created by: Robert Maxwell and Rudd Weatherwax
- Starring: Tommy Rettig; Jan Clayton; George Cleveland; Jon Provost; Cloris Leachman; Jon Shepodd; June Lockhart; Hugh Reilly; George Chandler; Robert Bray; Jack De Mave; Jed Allan; Clyde Howdy; Ron Hayes; Larry Wilcox; Richard Garland; Pamelyn Ferdin
- Theme music composer: Les Baxter
- Opening theme: Whistle
- Composer: Raoul Kraushaar
- Country of origin: United States
- Original language: English
- No. of seasons: 19
- No. of episodes: 591 (list of episodes)

Production
- Producers: Robert Golden; Robert Maxwell; Dusty Bruce; Rudolph E. Abel; Bonita Granville; Leon Fromkess
- Production location: California
- Running time: 26 minutes
- Production companies: Lassie Television; Robert Maxwell Associates; Jack Wrather Productions

Original release
- Network: CBS (1954–1971); Syndication (1971–1973)
- Release: September 12, 1954 – March 24, 1973

Related
- Lassie's Rescue Rangers; The New Lassie

Lassie is an American television series that follows the adventures of a female Rough Collie dog named Lassie and her companions, both human and animal. The show was the creation of producer Robert Maxwell and animal trainer Rudd Weatherwax and was televised from September 12, 1954, to March 24, 1973, making it the ninth longest-running scripted American primetime television series. The show ran for 17 seasons on CBS before entering first-run syndication for its final two seasons. Initially filmed in black and white, the show transitioned to color in 1965.

== Production ==
=== Narration ===
Associate producer Bonita Granville Wrather (wife of producer Jack Wrather), narrated numerous episodes throughout the run of the series, usually the beginning or ending of multi-part episodes.

=== Writers ===
Many early episodes were written by Robert Maxwell under the pseudonym Claire Kennedy. In later years, the writing partnership of Robert Schaefer and Eric Freiwald was responsible for over 150 episodes. They were also responsible for developing the idea of having Lassie with a forest ranger.

=== Theme music ===
Lassie used several pieces of theme music during its long broadcast history. For the first season, "Secret of the Silent Hills (Theme from the Lassie TV series)", is used for both the opening and ending theme. Composed by William Lava, the orchestral theme was originally created for the 1940 radio show The Courageous Dr. Christian.

For the second and third season a variation of this theme, titled simply "Lassie Main & End Title", was used for the opening and ending theme. Raoul Kraushaar, the music director for the series, is the listed composer for the theme; however the changes he made to the original are so slight that only a trained ear can tell the difference. The third theme used for the series is an orchestral rendition of the aria, "Dio Possente" (Even Bravest Hearts May Swell) from Charles Gounod's opera, Faust. The exact time this theme started being used is uncertain due to conflicting records; however it is agreed that it was the third series, and was used for at least part of season four for the change of ownership of Lassie.

The most famous of the Lassie theme songs appeared at the start of the fifth season. Copyrighted as "Lassie Main & End Title", the song was created by Les Baxter, with the whistling itself performed by Muzzy Marcellino. Nicknamed "The Whistler," it remained the series theme for the rest of the "Martin years". With the coming of the "Ranger years", the opening and ending theme was changed to an orchestral version of "The Whistler". Beginning in season 17 (where Lassie traveled alone), and continuing throughout the Holden Ranch era, the theme was changed again, this time to Nathan Scott's arrangement of the traditional folk tune Greensleeves, which became the series theme song for the rest of its run. For the final two seasons, the familiar closing visual of Lassie standing on a hill and lifting her paw, was replaced by the credits on a green background, and flashing from one slate to the other instead of scrolling as in most of the series run. Television composer Nathan Scott scored the music to nearly every episode between 1963 and 1973, except for four episodes.

== Plot and themes ==
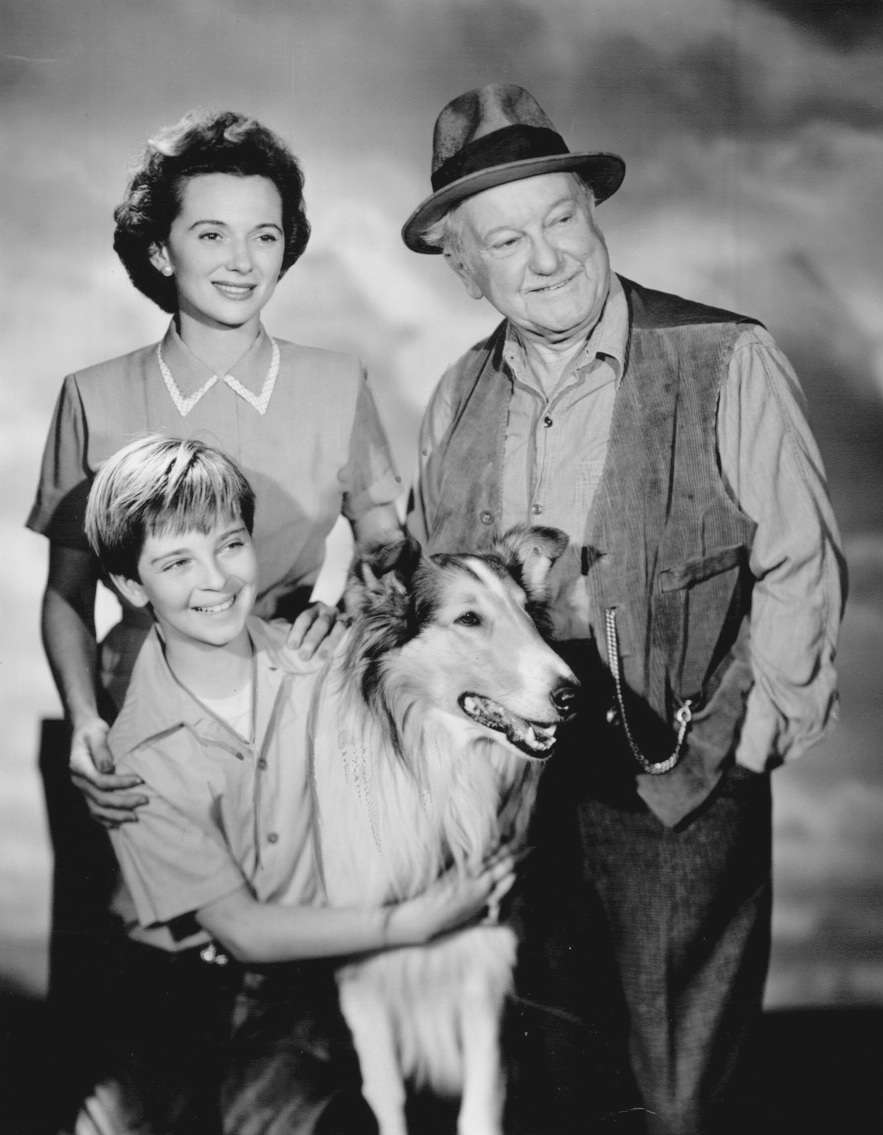
Original series stars Jan Clayton (as Ellen Miller—top left), George Cleveland (as Gramps—top right), and Tommy Rettig (as Jeff Miller—at bottom with Lassie)

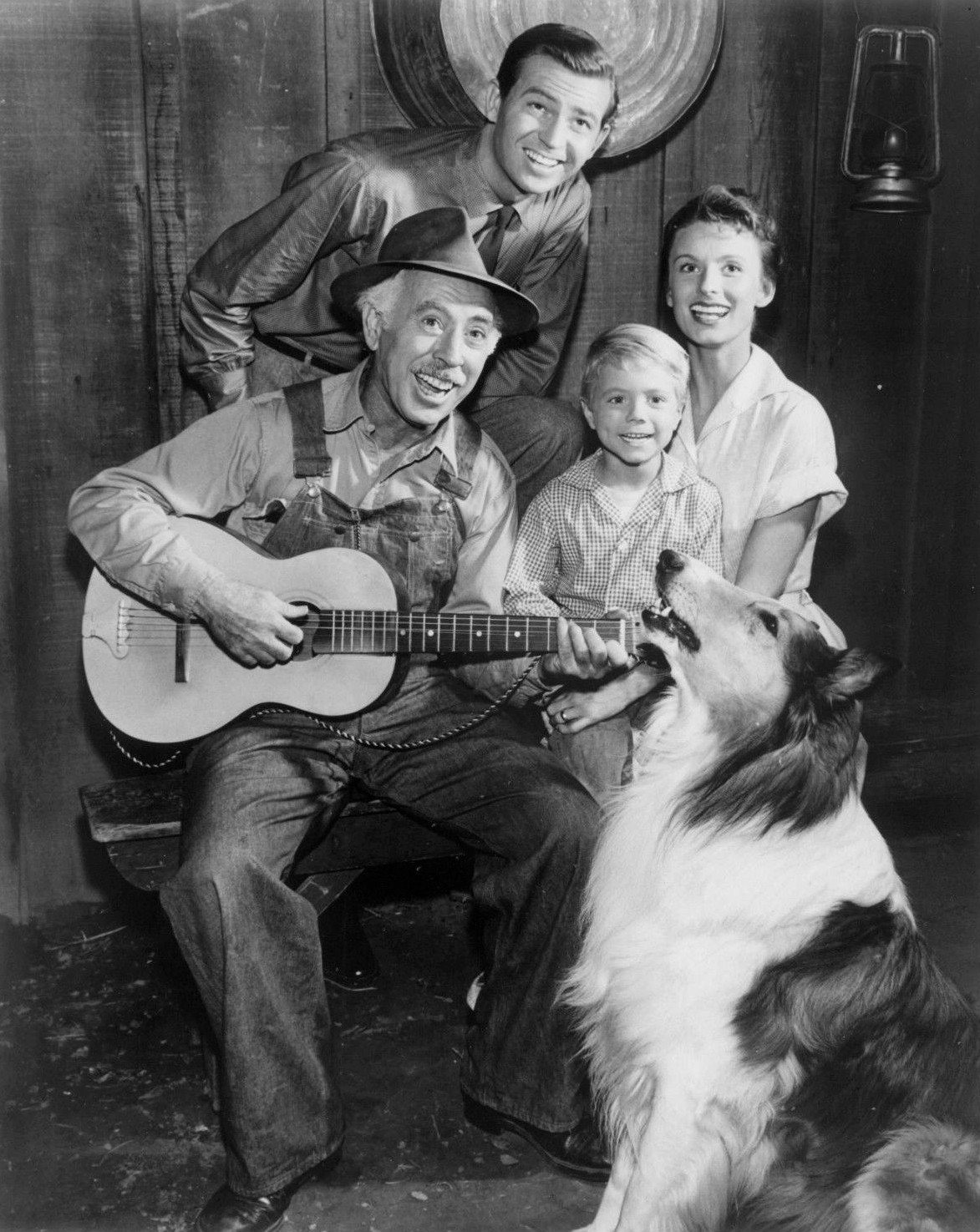
From left to right—George Chandler (as Uncle Petrie), Jon Shepodd (the original Paul Martin), Jon Provost (as Timmy Martin) and Cloris Leachman (the original Ruth Martin) during season 4 when the show transitioned from the Millers to the Martins

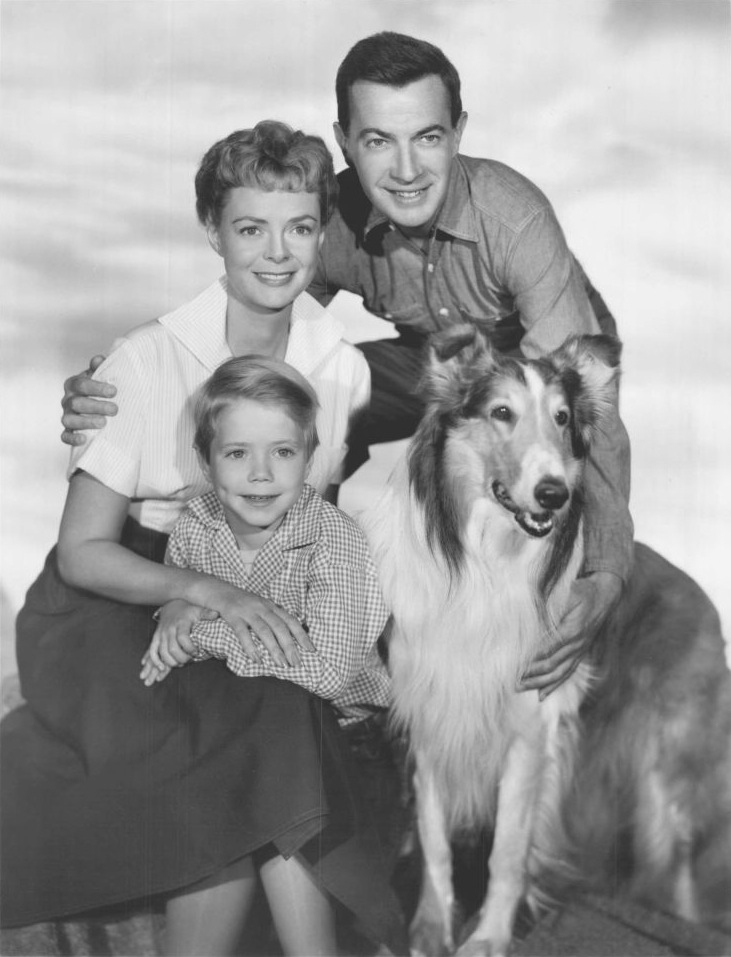
Hugh Reilly and June Lockhart took over as Paul and Ruth Martin from 1958 to 1964 (seasons 5–10).

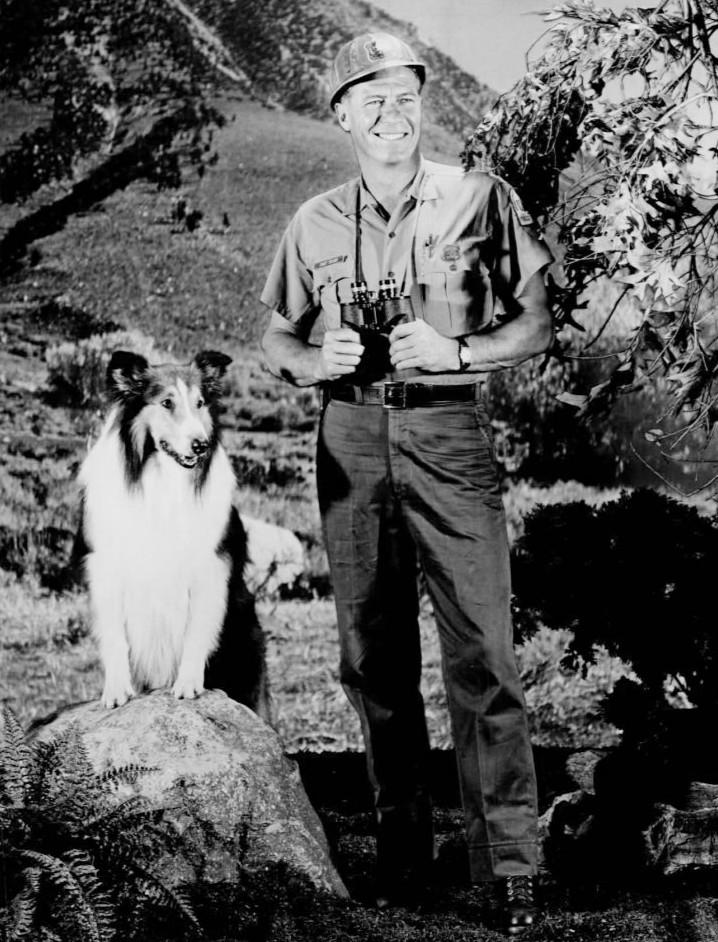
After 10 seasons on the farm with the Millers and the Martins, the series shifted to Lassie's adventures with the U.S. Forest Service during seasons 11–16, the bulk of that time featuring Robert Bray as Ranger Corey Stuart.

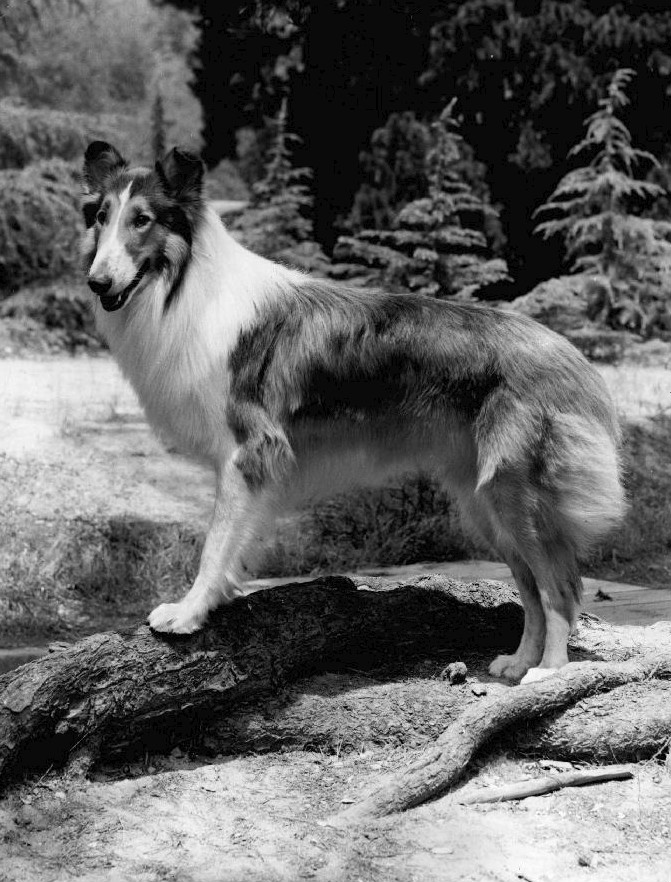
Season 17—the final CBS season—saw Lassie on her own, getting into different adventures each week. In seasons 18 and 19 (with the series airing in syndication), Lassie settled in at the Holden Ranch to close out the show's run.

The first 10 seasons of the series saw Lassie living on a farm. The first four seasons Lassie lived with the Miller family (Jeff, his mother Ellen, and her father-in-law George—who was called "Gramps" by Jeff). Ellen’s husband and Jeff’s father, John Miller, a soldier, was killed during World War II. Season 4 saw the Millers taking in young orphan Timmy, who then lived with them on the farm, as well as the unexpected death of Gramps (reflecting the real life death of actor George Cleveland, who played the character), and with that the Millers moved off the farm, but Timmy and Lassie would stay behind with his new foster parents, Paul and Ruth Martin, who also took over the farm. All 10 of the Miller/Martin farm seasons would for the most part focus on "boy and his dog" adventures with Jeff or Timmy getting involved in some sort of trouble, and Lassie eventually coming to the rescue.

Seasons 11–16 were the "Ranger years" of the series, as Lassie (because she was not able to go to Australia with the Martins when Paul got a job teaching agriculture there) was taken in by U.S. Forest Ranger Corey Stuart (who appeared in a few episodes of season 10) and began to work with the U.S. Forest Service. Color filming was exploited during the Ranger years with Lassie and her friends sent to exotic locations such as Sequoia National Forest and Monument Valley, creating mini-travelogues for viewers. Other rangers would be featured during the latter part of this era when Robert Bray (who played Stuart) left the series.

Season 17, showed Lassie traveling on her own, getting into different adventures each week (similar in format to The Littlest Hobo and, later, to Here's Boomer). No explanation was given as to why Lassie was no longer with the Forest Service. Some episodes during this final CBS season were animals only.

During seasons 18 and 19 (with the series having moved to first run syndication), Lassie was taken in by Garth Holden (played by Ron Hayes) who was in charge of the Holden Ranch—a home for orphaned boys—which he ran with his college-age son and his friend. This (somewhat) brought the show back to its roots by giving Lassie a farm/ranch home base, which is where she settled in for the final two years of the series.

== Episodes ==
Season	Setting	Episodes	Originally released		
Season	Setting	Episodes	First released	Last released	Network
1	Miller years (Jeff's Collie)	26	September 12, 1954	March 6, 1955	CBS
2	Miller years (Jeff's Collie)	39	September 11, 1955	June 3, 1956	CBS
3	Miller years (Jeff's Collie)	38	September 9, 1956	May 26, 1957	CBS
4	Martin years (Timmy & Lassie)	40	September 8, 1957	June 8, 1958	CBS
5	Martin years (Timmy & Lassie)	39	September 7, 1958	May 31, 1959	CBS
6	Martin years (Timmy & Lassie)	37	September 6, 1959	May 22, 1960	CBS
7	Martin years (Timmy & Lassie)	36	September 11, 1960	May 28, 1961	CBS
8	Martin years (Timmy & Lassie)	36	September 10, 1961	May 27, 1962	CBS
9	Martin years (Timmy & Lassie)	32	September 30, 1962	May 19, 1963	CBS
10	Martin years (Timmy & Lassie)	29	September 29, 1963	May 3, 1964	CBS
11	Ranger years	33	September 6, 1964	May 16, 1965	CBS
12	Ranger years	32	September 12, 1965	May 1, 1966	CBS
13	Ranger years	30	September 11, 1966	April 30, 1967	CBS
14	Ranger years	28	September 10, 1967	March 24, 1968	CBS
15	Ranger years	28	September 29, 1968	April 13, 1969	CBS
16	Ranger years	22	September 28, 1969	March 8, 1970	CBS
17	On her own	22	September 20, 1970	March 21, 1971	CBS
18	Holden Ranch years	20	October 7, 1971	March 10, 1972	Syndication
19	Holden Ranch years	24	September 16, 1972	March 24, 1973	Syndication

== Characters and cast ==
=== Human leads ===
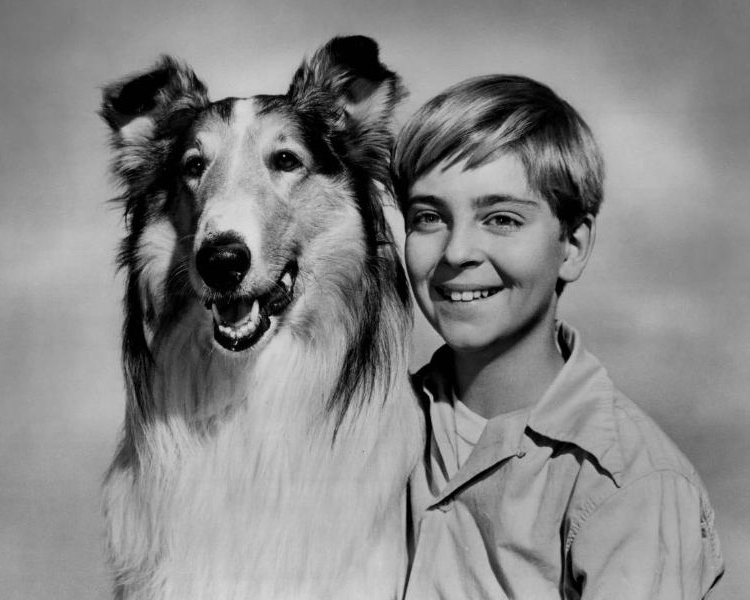
Tommy Rettig starred as Jeff Miller during the early years of the series (1954–1957), which were syndicated as Jeff's Collie.

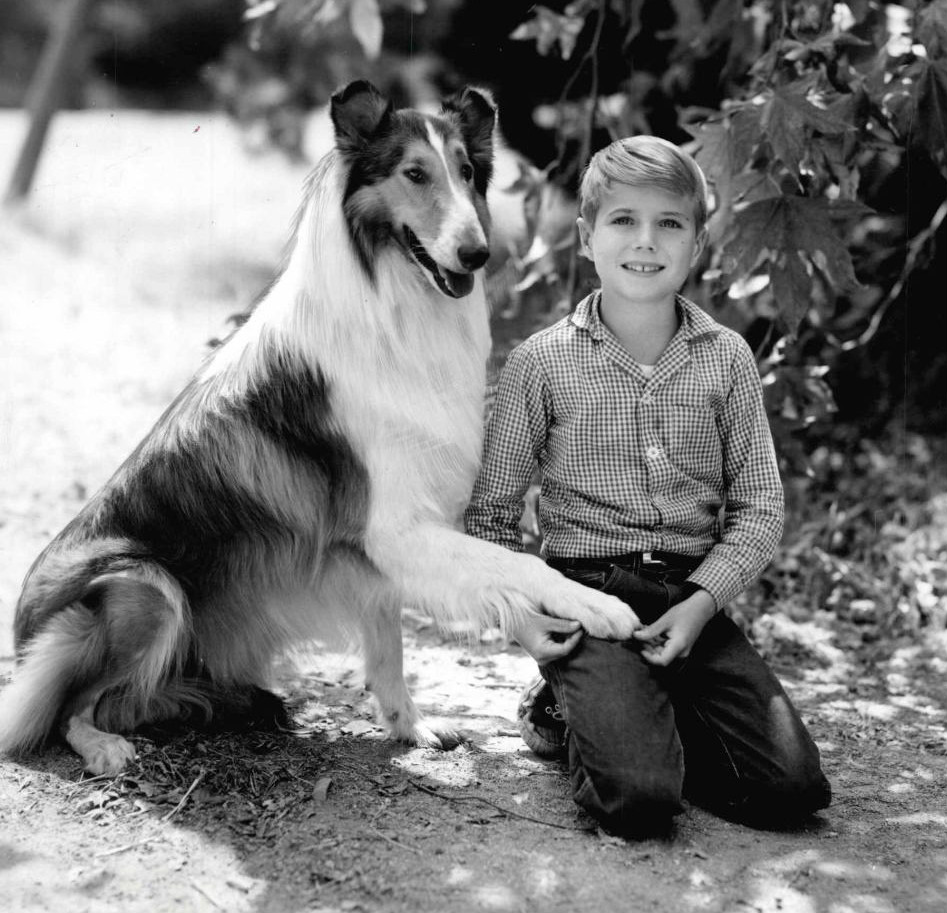
Jon Provost starred as Timmy Martin during the middle years of the series (1957–1964), which were syndicated as Timmy & Lassie.

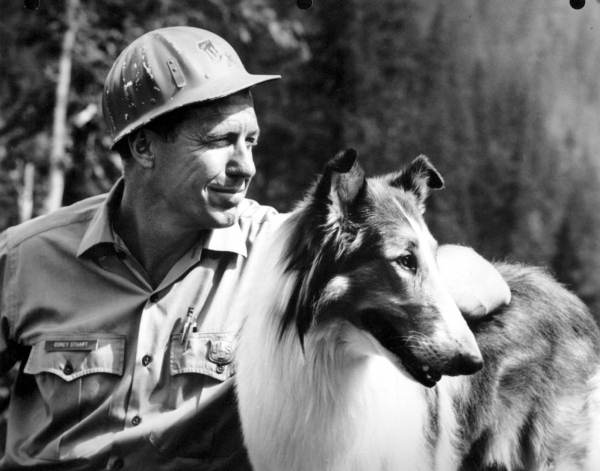
Robert Bray starred as Ranger Corey Stuart during the majority of the Forest Service years of the series from 1964–1968.

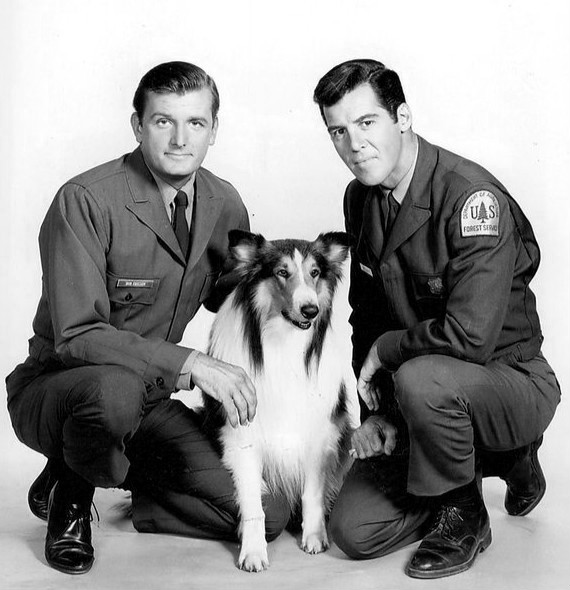
Jack De Mave (left) and Jed Allan (right) starred as Rangers Bob Erickson and Scott Turner, respectively, during the later Forest Service years of the series from 1968–1970.

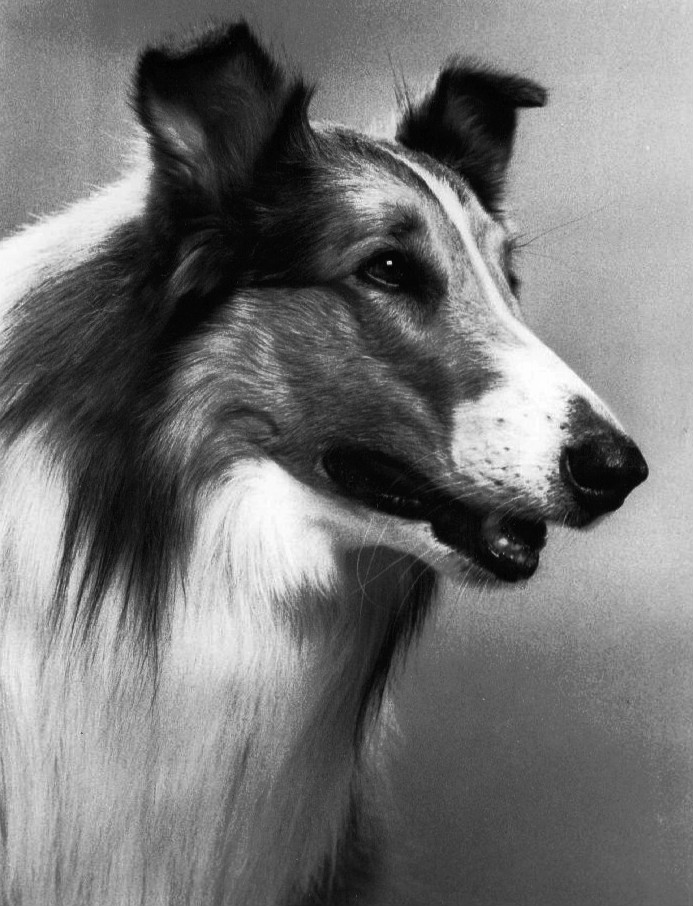
Lassie traveled on her own in the final CBS season (1970–71), getting into various adventures before settling in at the Holden Ranch for the final two seasons of the series once it moved to first-run syndication (1971–1973).

==== 1954–1957: Miller Family (Jeff's Collie) ====
- Ellen Miller – war-widowed farm woman (Jan Clayton)
- Jeff Miller – Ellen's eleven-year-old son (Tommy Rettig)
- George "Gramps" Miller – Ellen's father-in-law and Jeff's paternal grandfather (George Cleveland)
- Sylvester "Porky" Brockway – a farm boy and Jeff's friend (Joey D. Vieira – using the stage name "Donald Keeler")
- Constable Clay Horton – the sheriff (Richard Garland)

==== 1957–1964: Martin Family (Timmy & Lassie) ====
- Timmy Martin – a foster boy on the Miller farm (Jon Provost)
- Paul Martin – a young farmer, Ruth's husband and Timmy's adoptive father (Jon Shepodd 1957–1958; Hugh Reilly 1958–1964)
- Ruth Martin – Paul's wife and Timmy's adoptive mother (Cloris Leachman 1957–1958; June Lockhart 1958–1964)
- Uncle Petrie J. Martin – Paul's uncle (George Chandler) (1957–1959)
- Cully Wilson – a neighbor of the Martins, who was a farmer and nature lover (Andy Clyde) (1959–1964)
- Ralph "Boomer" Bates – a neighbor of the Martins who owned a dog named Mike and was Timmy's best friend (Todd Ferrell) (1958–1959)
- Scott Richards, another of Timmy's friends (Kelly Junge Jr.) (1958)

==== 1964–1970: U.S. Forest Service ====
- Forest Ranger Corey Stuart (Robert Bray) (1964–1968)
- Assistant Forest Ranger Hank Whitfield (Clyde Howdy) (1964–1966)
- Forest Ranger Bob Erickson (Jack De Mave) (1968–1970)
- Forest Ranger Scott Turner (Jed Allan) (1968–1970)

==== 1970–1971: Traveling on her own ====
- No human leads

==== 1971–1973: Holden Ranch ====
- Garth Holden – director of the Holden Ranch (Ron Hayes)
- Ron Holden – Garth's son (Skip Burton)
- Dale Mitchell – Ron's friend (Larry Wilcox)
- Keith Holden – Garth's brother (Larry Pennell)
- Lucy Baker – a deaf child living near the Holden Ranch (Pamelyn Ferdin)

=== Dog actors as Lassie ===
- Pal (Pilot episodes)
- Lassie Junior (1954–1959)
- Spook (1960)
- Baby (1960–1966)
- Mire (1966–1971)
- Hey Hey (1971–1973)

== Media information ==
=== Broadcast history ===
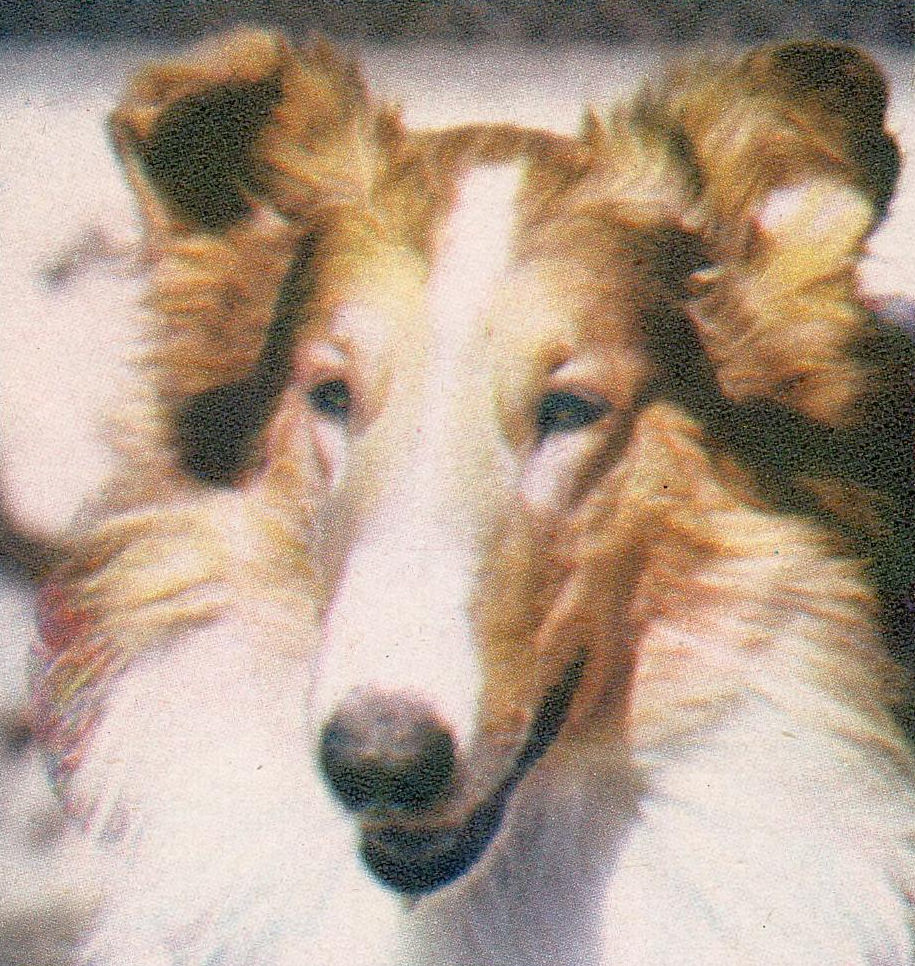
Lassie c. 1954

First-run Lassie was televised September 12, 1954 to March 24, 1973 with its first 17 seasons airing on CBS Sundays at 7:00 p.m. EST. In 1971, in order to promote community-related programming among local affiliates, the Federal Communications Commission moved primetime Sundays to 8:00 P.M. EST with the institution of the Prime Time Access Rule. CBS executives felt Lassie would not be well received in a time slot other than its traditional 7:00 p.m. slot, and, with the network's other family programs set, along with network being forced to air late afternoon football games in their entirety during the fall months beginning in 1970 as part of its contract with the NFL, the show was canceled. (Lassie was among several shows that CBS canceled during this time period as part of a change in its target demographics.) Lassie then entered first-run syndication with Jack Wrather and Campbell's Soup still on board, and remained on the air for another two years with its final episode airing in March 1973. All totaled, 591 episodes were produced.

An animated reworking, Lassie's Rescue Rangers, followed in fall 1973, immediately after the original series ended (the pilot movie aired in 1972 while the live-action series was still on the air). Lassie's Rescue Rangers was denounced by both Weatherwax and the National Association of Broadcasters, the latter of which made note of the animated series' "violence, crime and stupidity."

=== Later series ===
In 1973, ABC created an animated Saturday-morning program called Lassie's Rescue Rangers produced by Filmation.

In 1989, what was essentially a sequel series, The New Lassie – featuring Jon Provost as Steve McCullough – aired in first-run syndication. In its seventh episode ("Roots"), June Lockhart reprised her Ruth Martin role when Steve McCullough is revealed to be the adult Timmy Martin. It is revealed that Timmy was never properly adopted by the Martins and consequently was forced to remain in the U.S. when Ruth and Paul emigrated to Australia. Timmy was then subsequently adopted by the McCullough family and began going by his middle name Steven. In 1992, Tommy Rettig made a guest appearance in the final episode, "The Computer Study". This would be his last television appearance prior to his death in 1996.

In 1997, a modified remake – also called Lassie – debuted, airing in the U.S. on the then new Animal Planet cable network. This show (which was filmed in Canada and set in Vermont) also revolved around a boy named Timmy and his dog, though differences in setting and character circumstances precluded it from being an exact remake of the original series.

From 2014 to 2020, an animated series called Lassie or The New Adventures of Lassie was aired. Lassie lives with the Parker family, 10-year-old red-headed Zoe and her family, Ranger Graham Parker and Dr. Sarah Parker (a veterinarian), in the Grand Mountain National Park. Her best friend is Harvey Smith, whose mother Beth works in the park visitor center. Harvey's late father was a mountain climber. The children's antagonist is a snooty rich girl named Samantha Humphrey. Two seasons were done, the first with traditional drawn animation and the second season with computer-generated animation.

=== DVD releases ===
The series was released to DVD between 2001–2007.

DVD Name	# Ep	Release Date
Lassie's Great Adventure	5	June 26, 2001
Lassie: Best of the Lassie Show	3	November 25, 2003
Lassie: Lassie's Christmas Stories	3	November 25, 2003
Lassie: Best of Jeff's Collie	3	November 25, 2003
Lassie: Lassie's Birthday Surprise	3	November 25, 2003
Lassie: Lassie's Gift of Love	3	November 25, 2003
Lassie: 50th Anniversary Collection	24	September 14, 2004
Lassie: Flight of the Cougar	3	March 6, 2006
Lassie: A Mother's Love	4	May 1, 2007
Lassie's Greatest Adventures Collection (similar release of Lassie: 50th Anniversary Collection)	18	September 17, 2019

== Comics ==
The TV series was adapted into a comic book by Dan Spiegle, and published by Gold Key Comics.

== Reception ==
=== Ratings ===
Every year of its 17-year run on CBS, Lassie placed first in its time slot, Sunday 7:00 P.M. EST, and often ranked among the top 25 shows on television. The show's highest ranking years in the Nielsen ratings were the Martin years when the show placed #24 in 1957, #22 in 1958, #15 in 1959, #15 in 1961, #21 in 1962, #13 in 1963, and #17 in 1964. The only Martin year Lassie did not climb into the top twenty-five was 1960, when it ran opposite Walt Disney Presents on ABC and Shirley Temple Theater on NBC. Lassie still ran opposite Disney when the Disney anthology television series moved to NBC in 1961, and managed to climb back into the Top 25. With the advent of the Forest Service seasons, the show began a steady decline in ratings.

Season	Rank
1954–1955	Not in the Top 30
1955–1956	Not in the Top 30
1956–1957	#24
1957–1958	#22
1958–1959	Not in the Top 30
1959–1960	#29
1960–1961	Not in the Top 30
1961–1962	#15
1962–1963	#19
1963–1964	#12
1964–1965	#17
1965–1966	#27
1966–1967	#33
1967–1968	#30
1968–1969	Not in the Top 30
1969–1970	Not in the Top 30
1970–1971	Not in the Top 30

=== Awards and honors ===
(All awards listed given during the time of, or specifically related to the TV series)

- Two-time Emmy Award winner for Best Children's Program (1955, 1956)
- 1956 Peabody Award
- Three stars on the Hollywood Walk of Fame (Lassie – 1960, June Lockhart – 1960 for television, Jon Provost – 1994)
- 1967 U.S. Department of Agriculture Conservation Award (awarded to Lassie for promoting conservation during the series' Forest Service era)
- Timmy Martin's shirt, jeans, and Keds displayed at the Smithsonian Institution

=== Cultural impact ===
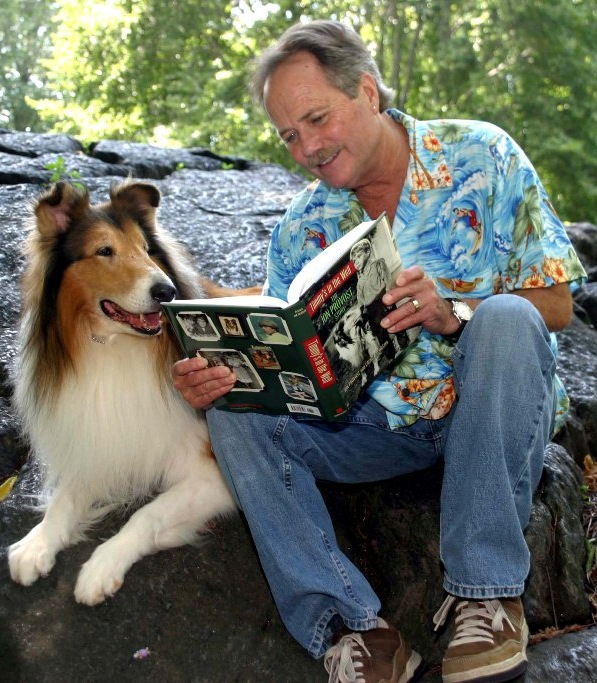
Jon Provost in a promotional photo for his autobiography Timmy's in the Well! (essentially portraying "Timmy" reading to "Lassie")

Jon Provost called his autobiography Timmy's in the Well! because a well was the one place Timmy never fell into—abandoned mine shafts, off cliffs, into rivers, lakes, and quicksand, but never a well.

Mad parodied the show as "Lizzy", where it was revealed that the collie was actually a circus midget in a dog suit, while the real Lizzy was a dimwitted mutt. In an episode of The Flintstones ("Dino Goes Hollyrock"), the character Dino wins an appearance on the smash hit TV show "Sassie" starring a heavily made-up and snobby girl dinosaur and her Lassie-like adventures.

Belgian comics artist Willy Vandersteen created his own version of the TV show with a collie named Bessy in 1954. Apart from the fact that his comic strip starred the same dog breed with a similar name, it had little to do with the series overall, since the comic was a Western comic.
