= Oh, God! (film series) =

Comedy film series

- Official film series logo
- Based on: Oh, God! by Avery Corman
- Starring: George Burns; Various actors; (See details)
- Production company: Warner Bros. Pictures
- Distributed by: Warner Bros.
- Release dates: October 7, 1977 (Oh, God!); October 3, 1980 (Oh, God! Book II); November 7, 1984 (Oh, God! You Devil)
- Country: United States
- Language: English
- Box office: $87,104,323 (Total of 3 films)

The Oh, God! film series consists of American comedy films, which explore Christianity in a contemporary setting. The plot, which is based on the novel of the same name by Avery Corman, centers around various characters as they encounter God and are asked to share their experiences with society, only for their sanity to be questioned by society. The movies star George Burns in the recurring role of the Supreme Being, and feature a different supporting cast in each installment.

Upon the release of each film, the installments were met with a range of critical reception. The original received critical acknowledgement, including accolades through becoming the recipient of multiple Saturn Awards, a Writers Guild of America Award, and a nomination for an Academy Award. The movie earned $51 million, turning a profit at the box office. Its success overshadowed the performance of its sequel however, as the second film was deemed by various analyses as inferior, while its financial gains were also lower in profit. The third installment, earned praise from a number of critics deeming its status as superior to its predecessor, with praise given to Burns in his dual-role. Reactions to the series among Christians ranged from questioning the intentions of the filmmakers, to praising the moral of the story through the lens of contemporary comedy.

The Oh, God! films were later released in a Blu-ray collection through Shout! Factory's Shout Select label.

== Development ==
The original novel, Oh, God! by Avery Corman, serves as the basic premise for the film series, and was originally published by Bantam Books on January 1, 1971. With a plot similar to the film, the story follows a struggling journalist who receives an offer in the mail to interview God. Though he initially believes this invitation to be a hoax, he pursues his curiosity and is pleasantly surprised to find the opportunity legitimate. Through a series of comedic circumstances, the value of Christianity in the modern-world is discussed, while God reveals that through various forms he is always present in mankind's lives.

== Film ==
Film	U.S. release date	Director	Screenwriter(s)	Story	Producer
Oh, God!	October 7, 1977	Carl Reiner	Larry Gelbart	Larry Gelbart	Jerry Weintraub
Oh, God! Book II	October 3, 1980	Gilbert Cates	Josh Greenfeld and Hal Goldman and Fred S. Fox and Seaman Jacobs and Melissa Miller	Josh Greenfeld	Gilbert Cates
Oh, God! You Devil	November 7, 1984	Paul Bogart	Andrew Bergman	Andrew Bergman	Robert M. Sherman

=== Oh, God! (1977) ===
Jerry Landers works tirelessly as the assistant manager at a local supermarket. One day while he works, God appears to him in the form of an unsuspecting elderly man, and informs Jerry that after repeated attempts of contact the former has been chosen become a modern-day messenger in the vein of Moses from the Old Testament era of The Bible. Though initially reluctant, Jerry ultimately agrees to the assignment of telling the world about the visit from the Almighty Creator of all things. As Jerry begins to tell the people he comes into however, including his wife Bobbie, he discovers to his dismay that his sanity comes into question. Continuing to receive visits from God and asked to convey additional messages, Jerry continues to fulfill his calling as best as he can. After conducting an interview with a religious report for the Los Angeles Times, Jerry finds himself confronted with legal action and must prove himself in a court of law that he is innocent of the accusations from his accusers. Jerry prays earnestly that God will be with him throughout the trial.

=== Oh, God! Book II (1980) ===
One day while a child named Tracy Richards is at a restaurant with her parents, she meets God in the form of an elderly man. Excited by her encounter and deeply impressed by the interaction she had, Tracy determines to start an advertisement campaign with the slogan of "Think God" spread throughout her city. While her intentions are for all of society to focus on God and shift their daily focus towards spiritual influences of their religion, she is surprised to receive a negative response from adults around her who believe that as a child she is inexperienced and doesn't understand life as they do. Refusing to state that her experience was a figment of her imagination, her divorced parents Don and Paula become concerned for her mental state and take her to see a doctor. As a panel of medical experts led by the psychiatrist Dr. Jerome Newell gives their extreme diagnosis and her parents pray for her, divine intervention comes to her aid when God reenters her life.

=== Oh, God! You Devil (1984) ===
Bobby Shelton is an amateur musician, who despite every effort of his own can't attain the professional success that he and his family needs. One day after a particularly discouraging performance, he offhandedly states that he would sell his soul to be in a better situation. Later while performing at a client's wedding, Shelton is approached with a proposition by a man who introduces himself as a producer named Harry O. Tophet. Tophet states that Bobby will have seven years of fame and stardom, if he will sign a contract which sells his eternal destiny. Desperate to make ends meet Shelton signs the document, but immediately realizes his mistake as his signature transforms into something different the man reveals that he is actually the devil Satan. The devil explains that through his demonic powers Bobby Shelton is now a world renown rockstar named Billy Wayne, a celebrity he is familiar with. As he initially enjoys the success he has attained Shelton is horrified to discover that he and Wayne have traded lives when his wife, and his children do not recognize him. Learning that prior to these events, Wendy had become pregnant with a baby, Shelton calls out to a higher power through a prayer. Immediately approached by God in the form of an elderly man, Shelton is initially hesitant to find a physical resemblance of this form and the previously presented Tophet. Learning through a parable that he must be wary of those around him that may be wolves in sheep's clothing, Shelton is relieved that God has come to save his soul. As the devil reappears to keep the contract intact however, God agrees to a climatic poker game where the deceived man's eternal destiny is at stake.

=== Potential future ===
In August 2004, a remake was announced to be in development by Warner Bros. Pictures, with Ellen DeGeneres cast as God. Based on an original pitch from DeGeneres, where the titular Christian deity would take the form of a female talk show host. Jerry Weintraub said he was to return in his role as producer, while acknowledging that he had green-lit the concept, after being impressed with the story that DeGeneres conceived; while also saying that Reiner and Gelbart had given their blessing towards realizing the modern film adaptation. Weintraub had intended for DeGeneres assist with writing the film. While the studio searched for a director; principal photography was planned to start during the hiatus of The Ellen DeGeneres Show in 2005.

Though the project continued through various development stages and production delays, Weintraub continued to try to develop a new Oh, God! film. In July 2010, Weintraub had pitched the film to studios, with the filmmaker suggesting Betty White as God alongside Paul Rudd as the mortal man character. The project entered development hell, and later Weintraub died in July 2015.

== Main cast and characters ==
List indicators

This section includes characters who will appear or have appeared in the franchise in main roles.

- An empty grey cell indicates the character was not in the film, or that the character's official presence has not yet been confirmed.
- ^{V} indicates a voice-only role.

Character	Films		
Character	Oh, God!	Oh, God! Book II	Oh, God! You Devil
God	George Burns	George Burns	George Burns
the Devil "Harry O. Tophet"			George Burns
Jerry Landers	John Denver		
Bobbi Landers	Teri Garr		
Adam Landers	Moosie Drier		
Becky Landers	Rachel Longaker		
Dr. Harmon	Donald Pleasence		
Sam Raven	Ralph Bellamy		
George Summers	William Daniels		
Judge Baker	Barnard Hughes		
Tracy Richards		Louanne Sirota	
Don Richards		David Birney	
Paula Richards		Suzanne Pleshette	
Judge Thomas Miller		Wilfrid Hyde-White	
Charles Benson		Conrad Janis	
Dr. Barnes		Hans Conried	
Bobby Shelton "Billy Wayne"			Ted Wass
Wendy Shelton			Roxanne Hart
Bobby's daughter			Brandy Gold
Arthur Shelton			John Doolittle
Bea Shelton			Julie Lloyd
Billy Wayne "Bobby Shelton"			Robert Desiderio
Charlie Gray			Eugene Roche

== Additional crew and production details ==
Title	Crew/Detail					
Title	Composer	Cinematographer	Editor	Production companies	Distributing company	Running time
Oh, God!	Jack Elliott	Victor J. Kemper	Bud Molin	Warner Bros. Pictures	Warner Bros.	1 hr 38 mins
Oh, God! Book II	Charles Fox	Ralph Woolsey	Peter E. Berger	Warner Bros. Pictures	Warner Bros.	1 hr 34 mins
Oh, God! You Devil	David Shire	King Baggot	Andy Zall	Warner Bros. Pictures	Warner Bros.	1 hr 37 mins

== Reception ==
=== Box office and financial performance ===
Film	Box office gross			Box office ranking		Total home video sales	Worldwide gross total income	Budget	Worldwide net total income	Ref.
Film	North America	Other territories	Worldwide	All-time North America	All-time worldwide	Total home video sales	Worldwide gross total income	Budget	Worldwide net total income	Ref.
Oh, God!	$51,061,196	—N/a	$51,061,196	#1,830	#3,033	Information not publicly available	>$51,061,196	$2,100,000	>$48,961,196	
Oh, God! Book II	$14,504,277	—N/a	$14,504,277	#4,582	#6,464	Information not publicly available	>$14,504,277	Information not publicly available	≤$14,504,277	
Oh, God! You Devil	$21,538,850	—N/a	$21,538,850	#3,665	#5,254	Information not publicly available	>$21,538,850	Information not publicly available	≤$21,538,850	
Totals	$87,104,323	—N/a	$87,104,323	x̄ #6,718	x̄ #4,917	>$0	>$87,104,323	>$2,100,000	≤$28,334,774	

=== Critical and public response ===
Title	Rotten Tomatoes	Metacritic
Oh, God!	75% (28 reviews)	56/100 (9 reviews)
Oh, God! Book II	43% (7 reviews)	35/100 (6 reviews)
Oh, God! You Devil	36% (11 reviews)	49/100 (7 reviews)
