= The Long Days of Summer =

- Genre: Drama
- Written by: Hindi Brooks; Lee Hutson
- Directed by: Dan Curtis
- Starring: Dean Jones; Joan Hackett; Ronnie Scribner; Louanne; Donald Moffat; Andrew Duggan; David Baron; Michael McGuire
- Narrated by: Charles Aidman
- Music by: Walter Scharf
- Country of origin: United States
- Original language: English

Production
- Executive producer: Dan Curtis
- Producers: Lee Hutson; Joseph Stern
- Cinematography: Charles Correll
- Editor: Bernard Gribble
- Running time: 81 minutes
- Production company: Dan Curtis Productions
- Budget: $750,000

Original release
- Network: ABC
- Release: May 23, 1980

The Long Days of Summer is a 1980 American made-for-television drama film and a sequel to When Every Day Was the Fourth of July (1978). Taking place one year later, the story follows now 13-year-old Danny (Ronnie Scribner, taking over the role played Chris Peterson in the 1978 film) and the Cooper family in 1938, as they begin to experience the effects of growing antisemitism in their small New England town, paralleling what is happening overseas in Adolf Hitler's Germany. The film was produced and directed by Dan Curtis and stars Dean Jones, Donald Moffat, Scribner and Louanne.

== Plot ==
In the summer of 1938 in Bridgeport, Connecticut, Jewish 13-year-old, Daniel Cooper finds himself tangling with the bigoted playground bully, Freddy Landauer. As the talk of Bridgeport centers around the pending rematch between boxing heavyweight champ Joe Louis and his German challenger Max Schmeling, Danny is challenged to a boxing match with Freddy, to which he feels he has no choice but to accept.

Paralleling Danny's plight, his father Ed also begins to experience antisemitism when he takes in a Jewish boarder from Germany, Josef Kaplan, who has come to the United States to warn of the increasing menace overseas in the form of Adolf Hitler. As Danny and his family are faced with their own pressures from within their small-town community, they must each make difficult decisions about standing up for what is right in the face of discrimination and intimidation.

== Cast ==
- Dean Jones as Ed Cooper
- Joan Hackett as Millie Cooper
- Ronnie Scribner as Daniel Cooper
- Louanne as Sarah Cooper
- Donald Moffat as Josef Kaplan
- Andrew Duggan as Sam Wiggins
- David Baron as Freddy Landauer Jr.
- Michael McGuire as Lieutenant O'Hare
- Lee de Broux as Fred Landauer Sr.
- Baruch Lumet as Rabbi
- Gloria Calomee as Clementine
- Leigh French as Frances Haley
- John Karlen as Duane Haley
- Tiger Williams as Charlie Wilson
- Adam Gunn as Howie Martin
- Brian Andrews as Marty Albert
- Danny Appel as Dave Zimmer
- Dave Shelley as Tom Wade
- Joe Medalis as Coach Dowd
- Stephen Roberts as Franklin D. Roosevelt
- Richard Reicheg as Bill Elliott
- Paula Brook as June Riley
- Steve Wayne as Butler
- Charles Aidman as Narrator

== Production ==
When Every Day Was the Fourth of July originally aired on the NBC network and was intended to be a pilot for a potential series. However, when the series was not picked up, Dan Curtis made The Long Days of Summer as a sequel, but this time airing on the ABC network instead.

Although a few of the original actors did return to reprise their roles, including Tiger Williams and Gloria Calomee, Dean Jones was the only lead to reprise his role, with the rest of the Cooper family portrayed by different actors for the sequel. Veteran film and television actor, Charles Aidman also returned to narrate as the voice of adult Danny Cooper, but was uncredited in both films. Child actress Louanne was cast to take over the role of Sarah for the sequel from Katy Kurtzman, becoming her very first role before rising to stardom in such films as Oh, God! Book II and A Night in the Life of Jimmy Reardon.

As with the first film, the decision was made to shoot "Bridgeport, Connecticut" in California. Curtis returned to the same neighborhood in Echo Park, Los Angeles, and shot many of the outdoor scenes for the sequel in the same locations that were used in the original film.

== Awards ==
Year	Award	Category	Recipient	Result	Ref.
1980	Youth In Film Award (now known as the Young Artist Award)	Best TV Special for Family Entertainment	–	Nominated	

== See also ==
- When Every Day Was the Fourth of July
