= Oh, God! You Devil =

- Theatrical release poster
- Directed by: Paul Bogart
- Written by: Andrew Bergman
- Produced by: Robert M. Sherman
- Starring: George Burns; Ted Wass; Ron Silver; Roxanne Hart; Eugene Roche
- Cinematography: King Baggot
- Edited by: Andy Zall
- Music by: David Shire
- Distributed by: Warner Bros. Pictures
- Release date: November 7, 1984
- Running time: 97 minutes
- Country: United States
- Language: English
- Box office: $21 million (domestic)

Oh, God! You Devil is a 1984 American comedy film, directed by Paul Bogart from a script written by Andrew Bergman. The movie is a sequel to Oh, God! Book II (1980) and serves as the third and final installment overall in Oh, God! film series. It stars George Burns, Ted Wass, Ron Silver, and Roxanne Hart. Produced by Robert M. Sherman, the screenplay is by Andrew Bergman. with a premise based on the 1971 novel of the same title by Avery Corman.

George Burns received a Saturn Award nomination for Best Actor for his performance.

== Plot ==
Struggling rock musician/songwriter Bobby Shelton cannot get a break. Bobby, desperate to support his wife, Wendy, and start a family, muses that he would sell his soul to the devil to get ahead. The Devil appears to Bobby as a prospective agent named Harry O. Tophet (Note: Tophet is a Hebrew word for "Hell".) and offers Shelton a deal: seven years of unprecedented fame and fortune. Shelton balks, and Tophet renegotiates, claiming that it will be for a "trial period," urging Bobby to leave his earnest agent Charlie. Shelton signs the document, but his signature transforms into that of rock star Billy Wayne, the last person to whom Tophet offered this deal. Bobby realizes that he has sold his soul to the Devil.

Shelton discovers that though he now has success, he has lost his identity and is now Billy Wayne. As such, Billy Wayne has assumed his identity and his family no longer recognize him. He also discovers that his wife is pregnant with his child. Realizing that he is trapped, Bobby asks for help from God, who has been watching over him. When Bobby is in Las Vegas for an important show, God appears after Bobby has "the Lord" paged in a hotel lobby and offers to help Bobby.

During a climactic poker game between God and the Devil over Bobby's soul, God raises the stakes while Bobby attempts suicide. God claims that if He loses, in addition to Bobby's soul, He will stop protecting all those on "His list". If God wins, the Devil would be prevented from meddling with any of those on the list, even if they beg for his assistance. Considering the stakes too high, Tophet folds and finds that God had been bluffing, winning by (in God's words) "put[ting] the fear of ME in YOU", and that part of the reason He intervened for Bobby was because the Devil had become too arrogant and cocky.

Bobby rises from the floor of the dressing room and slips away as staffers discover the corpse of Billy Wayne, who had died by suicide. God meets with Bobby and tells him about how his father once prayed for him when he was a sick child, and that since then, God has kept His eye on him. After warning Bobby that He will not bail him out next time, Shelton regains happiness by returning to a simple life with his loving wife and daughter. Years later, his daughter becomes sick, and Bobby says the same prayer that his father did. Bobby, God, and the spirit of Bobby's father later sing to his daughter the same song Bobby's father used to sing to him, "Fugue for Tinhorns" from the musical Guys and Dolls.

== Cast ==
- George Burns as God and the Devil (Harry O. Tophet)
- Ted Wass as Bobby Shelton
- Ron Silver as Gary Frantz
- Roxanne Hart as Wendy Shelton
- Eugene Roche as Charlie Gray
- Janet Brandt as Mrs. K
- Robert Desiderio as Billy Wayne
- John Doolittle as Arthur Shelton
- Julie Lloyd as Bea Shelton
- Belita Moreno as Mrs. Vega
- Jason Wingreen as hotel manager
- Susan Peretz as Louise
- Robert Picardo as Joe Ortiz
- Arthur Malet as houseman
- James Cromwell as priest
- Arnold Johnson as preacher
- Brandy Gold as Bobby's daughter
- Lois Wilde as casino patron (uncredited)

== Production ==
After the success of Oh, God, Warner Bros. approached other writers for sequels. They commissioned Josh Greenfield to write one and Andrew Bergman another. Bergman rewrote a play he had on his shelf about a songwriter who sells his soul to the devil: "Not a good play, but it was there sitting on my shelf. For me it was just an attempt to salvage something that I thought was a cute idea and was going nowhere. Also, I wanted to work with George Burns. This to me was linking up with a previous era of comedy... George was just the most fantastic person. He's so smart. Every single thing he said was funny."

== Reception ==
Based on 11 reviews, the film has a 36% rating on Rotten Tomatoes.
