= Gary Dubin =

American actor (1959–2016)

- Born: Gary Michael Dubin; May 5, 1959; Los Angeles, California, U.S.
- Died: October 8, 2016 (aged 57); Burbank, California, U.S.
- Other names: Gary Michaels; Garry Michaels
- Occupation: Actor
- Years active: 1966–2013
- Spouse: Marietha Zumaran (m. 2006)

Gary Michael Dubin (May 5, 1959 – October 8, 2016) was an American actor. He was best known for his portrayal of Punky Lazaar, a friend of Danny Partridge on The Partridge Family. He also voiced Toulouse in The Aristocats in 1970 and played the part of ill-fated teenager Eddie Marchand, who was eaten by the shark in Jaws 2.

Dubin portrayed a runaway boy on Green Acres in 1968. In 1969, he portrayed deaf boy Dal in the season 1 episode 25 of Land of the Giants titled, "Shell Game". He appeared in the James Bond film Diamonds Are Forever in the carnival scene, where he lost to Jill St. John at the water balloons, complaining that he had been cheated, and that she needed more wins to get the stuffed animal that, unknowing, contained the diamonds. Dubin was also a prominent voice actor in dubbing for Japanese animation throughout the 1990s to the early 2000s.

== Personal life and death ==
He has also acted in many other projects, his most recent being RockBarnes: The Emperor in You. Dubin died on October 8, 2016, from bone cancer, a sibling of his revealed. He was 57 years old.

== Filmography ==
Year	Title	Role	Notes
1966	Jericho	Younger Ferretti Boy	Episode: "Two for the Road: Part 2"
1967	Fitzwilly	Kid	Uncredited
1967	Family Affair	Eddie	Episode: "Our Friend Stanley"
1967	Accidental Family	George	Episode: "Sandy Gets Tough"
1967	Green Acres	Gilbert Henshaw; Kenny Mullen	Two Episodes: "Home is Where You Run Away From" and "Instant Family"
1968	Here Come the Brides	Charlie	Episode: "The Stand Off"
1969	Family Affair	Peter	Episode: "A Diller, a Dollar"
1969	The Doris Day Show	Freddie	Episode: "The Musical"
1969	Land of the Giants	Dal Ekorb	Episode: "Shell Game"
1969	The April Fools	Stanley Brubaker	
1969	Marcus Welby, M.D.	Peter	Episode: "Hello, Goodbye, Hello"
1969	Franchette: Les Intrigues	Himself	as Gary Michaels
1969–1970	Bracken's World	Mark Grant	
1970	Adam-12	Boy	Episode "Log 14: SWAT"
1970	The Young Lawyers	Jerry	Episode "Are You Running with Me, Jimmy?"
1970	The Aristocats	Toulouse	Voice
1971	Marcus Welby, M.D.	Gary Ledesma	Episode: "Elegy for a Mad Dog"
1971	Getting Together	Milton	Episode: "All Shook Up"
1971	Mannix	Mark	Episode: "Run Till Dark"
1971	The Mod Squad	Scooter Emory	Episode: "Feet of Clay"
1971	Diamonds Are Forever	Boy	Uncredited
1971–1974	The Partridge Family	Punky Lazaar	
1972	The Good Life	Lamar	Episode: "Dial 'M' for Merger"
1973	The F.B.I.		Episode: "The Disinherited"
1973	Marcus Welby, M.D.	Chris Bailey	Episode: "Gemini Descending"
1973	The Letters	Paul Anderson Jr.	The Andersons segment
1974	Shazam!	Mitch	Episode: "The Braggart"
1978	Jaws 2	Eddie Marchand	
1978	CHiPs	Teenager	Episode: "Trick or Trick"
1980	Eight Is Enough	Jeff	Episode: "Finally Grad Night"
1980	The Facts of Life	Boy #2	Episode: "Who Am I?"
1981	Midnight Offerings		TV movie
1981	Vega$	Cab Driver	Episode: "French Twist"
1981	Splendor in the Grass	Rusty	TV movie
1981	Jessica Novak	Jeff Baker	Episode: "The Boy Most Likely"
1982	Time Walker	Michael Goldstein	
1983	Super Dimension Century Orguss	Robert	Voice, English Version
1983	The Paper Chase		Two episodes
1985	V	Visitor Messenger	Episode: "The Betrayal"
1986	Outlanders	Nao	Voice, Animaze English Version
1987	Black Magic M-66	Leakey	Voice, English Version
1989–1990	The Guyver: Bio-Booster Armor	Oswald A. Lisker / Guyver II; Zector; Aptom	Voice, English Version
1990	Pump Up the Volume	TV Announcer #2	
1992	Bastard!!	Lars Ul Metallicana, Additional Voices	Voice, English Version as Gary Michaels
1992	Super Dimensional Fortress Macross II: Lovers Again	Matsui	Voice, English Version as Gary Michaels
1993	Ambassador Magma	Sakita	Voice, English Version as Gary Michaels
1995	Rakusho! Hyper Doll	Matsushita	Voice, English Version as Gary Dubois
1995	Super Dimension Century Orguss 02	Thug; Council; Gunner	Voice, English Version
1996	Mobile Suit Gundam: The 08th MS Team	Arth	Voice, English Version
1997	Battle Athletes Victory	Additional Voices	Voice, English Version as Gary Michaels
1998	USA High	Customer #2	Episode: "Lottery Fever"
1998	Mobile Suit Gundam: The 08th MS Team Miller's Report	Arth	Voice, English Version
1998	Martial Law	Morgan	Episode: "Shanghai Express"
1998	Mom's Outta Sight	Officer #1	
1992–1998	Giant Robo: The Animation - The Day the Earth Stood Still	Ivan the Terrible	Voice, USR / Manga Ent. English Version
1998	God, Sex & Apple Pie	—N/a	Casting associate
1999	Cowboy Bebop	George	Episode: "Wild Horses"; Voice, English version as Gary Michaels
1999	Fallout	Worker	
1999	Black Heaven	Additional Voices	Voice, English Version as Gary Michaels
1999	Bohemian Moon	Grandfather	as Gary Michaels
1999	Fist of the North Star	Bart	Voice, English Version as Gary Michaels
2000	Getting Away with Murder: The JonBenet Ramsey Story		
2000	The Big O	Additional Voices; Cop #1	Voice, English Version as Gary Michaels
2000	Beverly Hills, 90210	Customer Service Agent	Episode: "Eddie Waitkus"
2001	Power Rangers Time Force	Reporter #1	A Parting of Ways
2002	The Division	Bartender	Episode: "Beyond the Grave"
2002	The District	Dr. Fred	Episode: "Payback"
2002	Under the Gun	Larry	
2002	King's Highway	Mr. Kemer	
2003	Fake Stacy	Wex Waterhouse	Short
2004	Little Black Book	Father	
2005	Cursed	Police Officer #1	
2006	The Nine	FBI #1	Episode: "Pilot"
2008	Speedie Date	Giovanni	TV series short
2009	The Lodger	Male TV Reporter	
2010	Sonny with a Chance	Pilot	Episode: "Sonny with a Secret"
2011	Snatch Adams	Dean Spermin	Short
2011	No Guts No Glory	Fighter #2	Short as Gary Michaels
2012	Up All Night	Passenger	Episode: "Travel Day"
2012	The Jizzmaster	The JizzMaster	Short; Also co-producer
2012	The Jizzmaster Part 2	The Jizzmaster	Short; Also producer and director
2013	RockBarnes: The Emperor in You	Tim	(final film role)

== See also ==
- Dubbing (filmmaking)#United States and English-speaking Canada
- Voice acting in Japan
