= Which Way to the Front? =

1970 film by Jerry Lewis

- Theatrical release poster
- Directed by: Jerry Lewis
- Written by: Gerald Gardner; Dee Caruso; Dick Miller
- Produced by: Jerry Lewis
- Starring: Jerry Lewis; Jan Murray; Willie Davis; Joe Besser; Kathleen Freeman; Paul Winchell; Neil Hamilton
- Cinematography: W. Wallace Kelley
- Edited by: Russel Wiles
- Music by: Louis Y. Brown; Pete King
- Color process: Technicolor
- Distributed by: Warner Bros.
- Release date: July 1970
- Running time: 96 minutes
- Country: United States
- Language: English
- Box office: 1,474,881 admissions (France)

Which Way to the Front? is a 1970 American comedy film produced, directed by and starring Jerry Lewis, which was his first film for Warner Bros.

== Plot ==
Brendan Byers III is a rich playboy who enlists to fight in the war against the Axis powers, but is classified 4-F. He really wants to fight, so he enlists other 4-Fs and some loyal volunteers from his own service staff and forms his own mercenary army, financing their training and equipment. Once completed, they travel to the front in Italy, with Byers impersonating a Nazi general named Eric Kesselring.

The plan is to pull back the German lines, since the front has remained static for too long, enabling the Allies to push forward again. The mission does not go smoothly and they must overcome several obstacles, including the fiery wife of the local mayor who is the real Kesselring's lover, and the real Kesselring's involvement in an assassination attempt on Hitler. Afterwards, they face their next mission: infiltrating the Imperial Japanese command to influence the outcome of the Battle of Kwajalein.

== Cast ==
- Jerry Lewis as Brendan Byers III/Field Marshal Erik Kesselring
- Jan Murray as Sid Hackle
- Dack Rambo as Terry Love
- Steve Franken as Peter Bland
- John Wood as Finkel
- Willie Davis as Lincoln
- Kaye Ballard as Senora Messina
- Paul Winchell as Schroeder
- Kathleen Freeman as Bland's Mother
- Bobo Lewis as Camille Bland
- Harold J. Stone as General Buck
- Neil Hamilton as Chief of Staff
- Sidney Miller as Adolf Hitler
- George Takei as Yamashita
- Robert Middleton as Colonico
- Danny Dayton as Man in Car
- Robert Kino and Richard Loo as Japanese Naval Officers (uncredited)

== Production ==
Which Way to the Front? was filmed from November 30, 1969, through February 1, 1970 and received a G rating from the MPAA. It marked the final film appearance for actors Joe Besser, Neil Hamilton, and Kenneth MacDonald.

== Critical reception ==
In his review of the film for The New York Times, critic Howard Thompson wrote that it "has a rather original idea. The trouble is that each gag is painstakingly repeated, flattening the pace and squelching the sparkle," that "Lewis is quite funny for a while. But it wears thin," and that it "shine[s] momentarily with some truly fine, funny mimicry." A review of the film on Turner Classic Movies noted that it has the "ludicrous elements and dumb gags that Lewis fans are accustomed to," that it "contains enough stupid gags to keep a talented cast of comedians coasting on fumes regardless of whether the story makes any sense at all," and that "the tone of the film [is] utterly reckless, slapdash, and zany."

The film received a "BOMB" rating in Leonard Maltin's Movie Guide in which it is described as "one of Jerry's worst."

== Home media ==
Warner Archive released the film on made to order DVD in the United States on May 18, 2010.
