= Ralph Senensky =

American television director and writer (1923–2025)

- Born: May 1, 1923; Mason City, Iowa, U.S.
- Died: November 1, 2025 (aged 102); Carmel-by-the-Sea, California, U.S.
- Occupations: Director; screenwriter
- Years active: 1940–1988; 2001; 2013
- Notable work: Star Trek; The Waltons
- Website: senensky.com

Ralph Abbott Senensky (May 1, 1923 – November 1, 2025) was an American television director and screenwriter.

== Life and career ==
Senensky was born in Mason City, Iowa, on May 1, 1923 to William, the co-owner of a clothing store, and Jenny Senensky, a homemaker. He attended Mason City High School. He served in Europe during World War II from 1943 to 1945 and was eventually stationed in Belgium. He studied at the Pasadena Playhouse and worked as a stage director of 45 productions and as a production supervisor on Playhouse 90 before directing for television. Senensky directed multiple episodes for dozens of television shows, as well as made-for-TV films from 1958 to 1988, including The Fugitive, Naked City, Route 66, Mission: Impossible, Dynasty, The Paper Chase, The Big Valley, The Wild Wild West, Eight Is Enough, The Rookies, Trapper John, M.D., Dr. Kildare, Breaking Point, 12 O'Clock High, The F.B.I., The Courtship of Eddie's Father, Dan August, Nanny and the Professor, Barnaby Jones, Insight, Hart to Hart, Death Cruise, The New Adventures of Heidi, the original series of Star Trek, The Twilight Zone, Ironside, The Partridge Family and The Waltons. He also directed most of the feature film Harper Valley PTA. For Breaking Point, he directed an episode that had one of the first gay storylines in a TV show. He directed six full Star Trek episodes and was fired partway through the filming of "The Tholian Web". Among the episodes of The Waltons directed by Senensky was "Grandma Comes Home", which earned an Emmy Award nomination for Ellen Corby.

He retired in 1988, but has had small stints directing since, including a theatre production and a film short. He turned 100 on May 1, 2023. With the death of Robert Butler on November 3, 2023, Senensky was the last surviving person to have directed an episode of the original series of Star Trek, before his own death in a hospital in Carmel-by-the-Sea, California, on November 1, 2025, at the age of 102.

== Filmography ==
=== Films ===
Year	Film	Credit	Notes
1970	The Cliff	Director	Television movie
1973	A Dream for Christmas	Director	Television movie
1973	Winesburg, Ohio	Director	Television movie
1974	The Family Kovac	Director	
1974	Death Cruise	Director	Television movie
1975	The Family Nobody Wanted	Director	Television movie
1976	Jeremiah of Jacob's Neck	Director	Television movie
1978	Harper Valley PTA	Director (Uncredited)	
1978	The New Adventures of Heidi	Director	Television movie
1980	Dan August: Once Is Never Enough	Director	Edit of his prior TV work for movie form
1980	Dan August: Murder, My Friend	Director	Edit of his prior TV work for movie form
1980	Treachery and Greed on the Planet of the Apes	Director	
1981	Big Bend Country	Director	Television movie
2013	The Right Regrets	Director	Short

=== Television ===
Year	TV Series	Credit	Notes
1958–1959	Playhouse 90	Production supervisor, production coordinator	4 episodes
1961–1965	Dr. Kildare	Director	5 episodes
1962	Checkmate	Director	1 episode
1963	Channing	Director	1 episode
1963	East Side/West Side	Director	1 episode
1963	Naked City	Director	3 episodes
1963	Route 66	Director	2 episodes
1963	The Twilight Zone	Director	1 episode
1963–1964	Arrest and Trial	Director	2 episodes
1963–1964	Breaking Point	Director	3 episodes
1963–1964	The Nurses	Director	2 episodes
1963–1965	Kraft Suspense Theatre	Director	3 episodes
1964–1965	The Fugitive	Director	4 episodes
1965	Bob Hope Presents the Chrysler Theatre	Director	1 episode
1965	The Long, Hot Summer	Director	1 episode
1965	Slattery's People	Director	1 episode
1965	12 O'Clock High	Director	4 episodes
1966	The Big Valley	Director	1 episode
1966	The Wild Wild West	Director	2 episodes
1966–1972	The F.B.I.	Director	16 episodes
1967	The High Chaparral	Director	1 episode
1967	Judd, for the Defense	Director	1 episode
1967	Mission: Impossible	Director	1 episode
1967–1968	Ironside	Director	2 episodes
1967–1968	Star Trek	Director	6 1/2 episodes
1968	I Spy	Director	1 episode
1968	Mannix	Director	1 episode
1968	The Name of the Game	Director	1 episode
1969	Then Came Bronson	Director	1 episode
1969–1970	The Bill Cosby Show	Director	4 episodes
1969–1970	The Courtship of Eddie's Father	Director	6 episodes
1969–1980	Insight	Director	15 episodes
1970	The Interns	Director	1 episode
1970	Matt Lincoln	Director	1 episode
1970–1971	Nanny and the Professor	Director	6 episodes
1970–1971	The Partridge Family	Director	7 episodes
1971	Dan August	Director	5 episodes
1971	Getting Together	Director	3 episodes
1972	Banyon	Director	3 episodes
1972	Night Gallery	Director	1 episode
1972–1973	The Rookies	Director	2 episodes
1973	Search	Director	1 episode
1973–1975	Barnaby Jones	Director	3 episodes
1973–1978	The Waltons	Director	12 episodes
1974	Planet of the Apes	Director	1 episode
1975	The Blue Knight	Director	1 episode
1975	The Family Holvak	Director	2 episodes
1975	Medical Story	Director	1 episode
1975	Three for the Road	Director	2 episodes
1976	City of Angels	Director	1 episode
1977	Eight Is Enough	Director	1 episode
1977	Family	Director	1 episode
1977	Westside Medical	Director	1 episode
1978	James at 16	Director	1 episode
1979	How the West Was Won	Director	1 episode
1979	Trapper John, M.D.	Director	1 episode
1979–1984	Hart to Hart	Director	7 episodes
1980	Lou Grant	Director	1 episode
1980	Young Maverick	Director	1 episode
1981	Dynasty	Director	4 episodes
1983	Casablanca	Director	2 episodes
1984	Paper Dolls	Director	3 episodes
1985–1986	The Paper Chase	Director	7 episodes

== See also ==
- List of centenarians (actors, filmmakers and entertainers)
