= The New Adventures of Heidi =

- Genre: Musical; Comedy; Drama
- Based on: Heidi characters created by Johanna Spyri
- Written by: John McGreevey
- Directed by: Ralph Senensky
- Starring: Burl Ives; Katy Kurtzman; John Gavin; Marlyn Mason
- Music by: Buz Kohan
- Country of origin: United States
- Original language: English

Production
- Executive producer: Pierre Cossette
- Producer: Charles B. Fitzsimons
- Production locations: Westin Bonaventure Hotel & Suites - 404 S. Figueroa Street, Downtown, Los Angeles, California; Sisters of the Immaculate Heart of Mary - 3431 Waverly Drive, Los Angeles, California; Ahmanson Mansion - 401 South Hudson Place, Hancock Park, Los Angeles, California; Culver Studios - 9336 W. Washington Blvd., Culver City, California; Snowmass, Colorado; Warner Brothers Burbank Studios - 4000 Warner Boulevard, Burbank, California
- Cinematography: John Nickolaus
- Editor: Gene Fowler Jr.
- Running time: 98 minutes
- Production company: Pierre Cossette Enterprises

Original release
- Network: NBC
- Release: December 13, 1978

The New Adventures of Heidi (alternate title Heidi's Christmas) is a 1978 American made-for-television musical comedy-drama film updating the Heidi character to the present time and shifting the action from Switzerland to New York City. The film was released theatrically in Spain and Australia. Charles B. Fitzsimons had the idea to turn the film into a musical with comedy writer Buz Kohan writing ten songs for the film, sung by the stars Katy Kurtzman, Burl Ives, John Gavin and Marlyn Mason who played Heidi on stage in 1954 at the Player's Ring Theatre in Hollywood.

== Plot ==
When Heidi's grandfather finds he is losing his sight he does not wish to tell Heidi, but he makes her live with her relatives, Cousins Tobias and Martha to attend school in a large city. There Heidi meets the troubled Elizabeth Wyler who is fascinated by Heidi and her rural life. Through his secretary Mady, Heidi joins Elizabeth and her busy widowed father Dan Wyler for a Christmas in New York City.

== Cast ==
- Katy Kurtzman as Heidi
- Burl Ives as Grandfather
- John Gavin as Dan Wyler
- Marlyn Mason as Mady
- Sherrie Wills as Elizabeth Wyler
- Sean Marshall as Peter
- Alex Henteloff as Chef Andre
- Charles Aidman as The Hermit
- Walter Brooke as Cousin Tobias
- Amzie Strickland as Cousin Martha
- Molly Dodd as Mother Gertrude
- Adrienne Marden as Sister Agnes
- Arlen Stuart as Telephone Operator
- Barry Cahill as Hotel Manager Krebbs
- Bartlett Robinson as Oscar the Butler

== Production ==
With the low budget of the television film precluding having the film shot in Switzerland or New York City, the crew shot Swiss sequences in Snowmass, Colorado with imitation red poppies and the Westin Bonaventure Hotel in Los Angeles, California with imitation snow.

== Novelization ==
A paperback novelization of the film was written by John Pearson and published by Dell Publishing in December 1978 as a promotional tie-in.

== See also ==
- List of Christmas films
