= Oh, God! (film) =

1977 American film by Carl Reiner

- Theatrical release poster
- Directed by: Carl Reiner
- Screenplay by: Larry Gelbart
- Based on: Oh, God! by Avery Corman
- Produced by: Jerry Weintraub
- Starring: George Burns; John Denver; Teri Garr; Donald Pleasence
- Cinematography: Victor J. Kemper
- Edited by: Bud Molin
- Music by: Jack Elliott
- Distributed by: Warner Bros.
- Release date: October 7, 1977
- Running time: 98 minutes
- Country: United States
- Language: English
- Budget: $2.1 million
- Box office: $51 million

Oh, God! is a 1977 American comedy film starring George Burns and John Denver. Based on the 1971 novel by Avery Corman, the film was directed by Carl Reiner from a screenplay by Larry Gelbart. The story centers on supermarket manager Jerry Landers (Denver), who is chosen by God (Burns) to spread His message despite skepticism of the media, religious authorities, and his own wife (Teri Garr).

The movie's success spawned its titular film series, which included two sequels: Oh, God! Book II (1980) and Oh, God! You Devil (1984). Both featured Burns reprising his role, but no other characters from the original story.

== Plot ==
God appears as a kindly old man to Jerry Landers, an assistant supermarket manager. He tells Jerry that he has been selected to be his messenger to the modern world, much like a contemporary Moses. He tells Jerry to tell people that God exists, and that things on Earth can work out well, but that it's up to people to make it happen. Landers tells his wife, children and a religion editor of the Los Angeles Times of his encounters with God and becomes a national icon of comedic fodder.

Jerry appears on television with Dinah Shore and describes the look God takes when He encounters him. The next day, after Jerry is stranded from a car breakdown, God appears as a taxi driver to take him home, where they are met by a bunch of chanting "religious nuts". Before He disappears, God consoles Jerry that he has the "strength that comes from knowing".

Landers finds his life turned upside down as a group of theologians attempt to discredit him. They challenge him to answer a series of questions in Aramaic while locked in a hotel room alone, to prove God is contacting him directly. After an agonizing wait, God delivers food to Jerry and answers the questions.

After being sued for slander by a charismatic preacher whom God directed Jerry to call a "phony", Jerry decides to prove his story in a court of law. He argues that if God's existence is a reasonable possibility, he can materialize and sit in the witness chair if he chooses. At first, God fails to appear and the judge threatens to charge Jerry with contempt. Jerry argues that when everyone waited a moment to see what would happen when he raised the mere possibility of God appearing, it proved he at least deserved the benefit of the doubt.

Suddenly God appears and asks to be sworn in. He provides some miracles, first in the form of card tricks for the judge. Then He leaves the stand, walks a few steps, and, with everyone watching, disappears. God's voice does not appear on the court tape recording, nor on the court stenographer's tape. The judge has no choice but to dismiss the case.

Some time later, Jerry meets God again. God states that he is going on a trip to spend some time with animals. Jerry expresses worry that they failed, but God compares him to Johnny Appleseed, saying he was given the best seeds and they will take root. God prepares to leave and says he will not be coming back. Jerry then asks what to do if he needs to talk with him. God says, "I'll tell you what, you talk. I'll listen.” Jerry smiles as God departs.

== Cast ==
- George Burns as God
- John Denver as Jerry Landers
- Teri Garr as Bobbie Landers
- Donald Pleasence as Doctor Harmon
- Ralph Bellamy as Sam Raven
- William Daniels as George Summers
- Barnard Hughes as Judge Baker
- Paul Sorvino as Reverend Willie Williams
- Barry Sullivan as Bishop Reardon
- Dinah Shore as Herself
- Carl Reiner as Dinah's Guest
- Jeff Corey as Rabbi Silverstone
- George Furth as Briggs
- David Ogden Stiers as Mr McCarthy, District Produce Manager
- Titos Vandis as Greek Bishop
- Moosie Drier as Adam Landers
- Rachel Longaker as Becky Landers
- Jerry Dunphy as Newscaster
- Mario Machado as TV Reporter
- Connie Sawyer as Mrs. Green
- Jane Lambert as Mrs. Levin
- Kres Mersky as Check-out Girl
- Byron Paul as TV Engineer
- Hector Morales as Waiter
- Wonderful Smith as Court Clerk
- Murphy Dunne as Stenographer
- Boyd Bodwell as Religious Fanatic
- Zane Buzby as Girl
- Dennis Kort as Norman
- Bob McClurg as Mechanic
- Celeste Cartier as Second Check-out Girl

=== Casting ===
Gelbart originally wanted Woody Allen to play Jerry Landers and Mel Brooks to play God but Allen declined because he was already making his own film dealing with God, Stardust Memories.

== Release ==
The film was released on October 7, 1977, in 198 theaters and earned $1.9 million on its opening weekend. It ultimately grossed $51,061,196 domestically, making it the ninth-highest-grossing film of 1977.

== Reception ==
Oh, God! was a critical and commercial success. It was regarded in many reviews as one of the best films of 1977, including Gene Siskel, who placed it on his top 10 list for the year. Roger Ebert gave the film 3.5 stars out of possible 4, praising the casting of Burns and Denver and noting that Oh God! struck the right tone by avoiding both pious religious platitudes and "cheap shots" about faith.

The film holds a 72% "Fresh" rating on the review aggregate website Rotten Tomatoes from 29 reviews. The site's consensus states: "Oh, God!'s Biblical playfulness makes for more cute farce than divine comedy, but George Burns' sly performance as the Almighty gives this high concept gravitas".

=== Awards ===
Larry Gelbart's screenplay received an Oscar nomination for Best Adapted Screenplay and a Saturn Award nod for Best Writing. The screenplay also won the Writers Guild award for Best Comedy Adapted from Another Medium.

Oh, God! was also awarded two Saturn Awards for Best Fantasy Film and Best Actor for George Burns. It received an additional nomination for Carl Reiner's direction.

=== Legacy ===
Oh, God! has become a cornerstone of the On Cinema parody film review series, appearing as a recurring joke for several years. Its filming locations are featured repeatedly in the "On Cinema On Location" segments, as well as a segment in the "On Cinema Live" touring show, where Gregg Turkington presented "a slideshow detailing the career trajectories of actors who starred in Oh, God!".
