= Meredith Salenger =

American actress (born 1970)

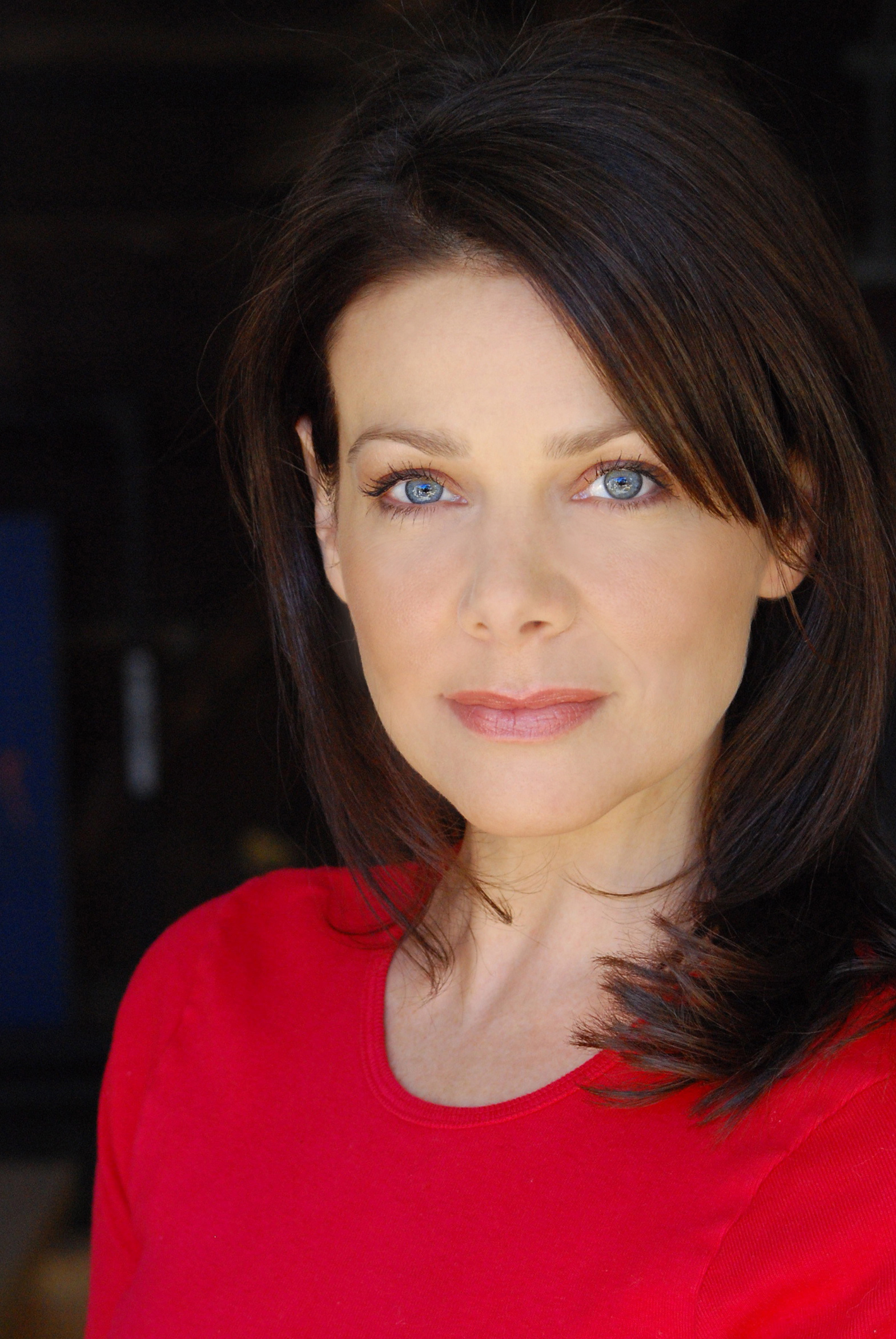
- Salenger in 2008
- Born: March 14, 1970 (age 56); Malibu, California, U.S.
- Education: Harvard University
- Occupation: Actress
- Years active: 1982–present
- Spouse: Patton Oswalt (m. 2017)

Meredith Salenger (born March 14, 1970) is an American actress. Her credits include the 1985 film The Journey of Natty Gann, as the title character, and the 1989 teen comedy Dream a Little Dream.

== Early life ==
Salenger was born in Malibu, California and is the daughter of Dorothy, an interior designer, and Gary Salenger, a dentist. She is Jewish; her family was originally from Austria and Russia.

Salenger enrolled at Harvard University and graduated cum laude with a degree in psychology in 1992. She received certificates in "Court-Based Mediation of Family Law Matters" and "Mediating the Litigated Case" from the Straus Institute for Dispute Resolution at Pepperdine University School of Law in 2009 and 2011, respectively. She works as a mediator for the Agency for Dispute Resolution in Beverly Hills, California, when she is not filming.

== Career ==
Salenger's first starring role was in the Disney film The Journey of Natty Gann. After starring in four more films by her eighteenth birthday, including A Night in the Life of Jimmy Reardon, The Kiss (1988) and Dream a Little Dream (1989), she left Hollywood for Harvard to further her education.

Salenger resumed her acting career upon her return to Hollywood with credits including Lake Placid and The Third Wheel. Salenger has also appeared in independent films, including Quality Time and Sparkle & Charm.

Salenger appeared in a 1998 episode of Buffy the Vampire Slayer. She also recorded a song titled "Flow Through Me" with Koishii and Hush; and she appeared as a background member of the Counting Crows video for "Hanging Around".

Salenger appeared in two episodes of Dawson's Creek in 2002 as film critic Amy Lloyd, and guest-starred on Cold Case playing victim Sloane Easton on the episode "Ravaged". Salenger had a cameo in the Disney film Race to Witch Mountain in 2009, where she played a television reporter named Natalie Gann.

Salenger has performed the voices of several characters in Cartoon Network's Star Wars: The Clone Wars, including Jedi Padawan Barriss Offee and Ione Marcy during the second season, Che Amanwe Papanoida during the third season, and Pluma Sodi during the fourth season. She also appeared as Lisa Sanders in the one-hour Nick at Nite drama series Hollywood Heights which lasted 80 episodes, as well as several characters in Mad and Robot Chicken television series. In addition, Salenger voiced a Nightsister ghost in a season three episode of Star Wars Rebels. She can be seen opposite Elias Koteas in Jake Squared along with Virginia Madsen and Jennifer Jason Leigh.

In November 2024, it was announced that Salenger and her husband, Patton Oswalt, would produce the short film Sardinia.

== Personal life ==
Salenger and comedian Patton Oswalt were engaged in July 2017, marrying on November 4 of that year.

== Filmography ==
=== Film ===
Year	Title	Role	Notes
1982	Annie	Orphan #2	Uncredited
1985	The Journey of Natty Gann	Natty Gann	
1988	A Night in the Life of Jimmy Reardon	Lisa Bentwright	
1988	The Kiss	Amy Halloran	
1989	Dream a Little Dream	Lainie Diamond	
1991	Edge of Honor	Alex	
1994	Dead Beat	Donna	
1995	Village of the Damned	Melanie Roberts	
1995	Venus Rising	Maria	Direct-to-video
1997	Sparkle and Charm	Gwen	
1998	Sour Grapes	Degan	
1998	No Code of Conduct	Rebecca Peterson	
1998	Bug Buster	Veronica Hart	
1999	Matters of Consequence	Reiko	
1999	Lake Placid	Deputy Sharon Gare	
2001	Good Advice	Amy	
2001	My Best Friend's Wife	Ami Meyer	
2002	The Third Wheel	Sara	
2006	The Work and the Glory III: A House Divided	Caroline Mendenhall	
2008	My Apocalypse	Susan Stone	
2009	Race to Witch Mountain	Natalie Gann	
2011	The Lamp	Lisa Walters	
2017	Lego DC Super Hero Girls: Brain Drain	Lashina	Voice role, direct-to-video
2017	An American Dog Story	Daniella	
2018	The Second Coming of Christ	Dr. Clea	
2018	Lego DC Super Hero Girls: Super-Villain High	Lashina	Voice role, direct-to-video
2018	Teen Titans Go! To the Movies	Supergirl	Voice cameo
2019	The Secret Life of Pets 2	Cat Lady	Voice role
2020	Jelly Bean	Mom	Short film
2022	The Prank	Julie Palmer	
2024	Sardinia	N/A	Executive producer

=== Television ===
Year	Title	Role	Notes
1986	The Last Frontier	Tina Adamson	Television film
1986–1987	The Magical World of Disney	Amber Wheeler / Natty Gann	3 episodes
1988	April Morning	Ruth Simmons	Television film
1993	Tales from the Crypt	Mona	Episode: "House of Horror"
1995	Legacy of Sin: The William Coit Story	Robin Coit	Television film
1996	Pier 66	Kate Kelly	Television film
1996	L.A. Firefighters	Michelle Goldstein	3 episodes
1996	The Sentinel	Amber	Episode: "Ice Man"
1997	Poltergeist: The Legacy	Emma Scott	Episode: "Dark Angel"
1998	Buffy the Vampire Slayer	Grace Newman	Episode: "I Only Have Eyes for You"
1999	Chicks	Nic	Television film
2000	H.U.D.	Mason Noble	Television film
2001	Resurrection Blvd.	Jane Ensler	3 episodes
2002	Dawson's Creek	Amy Lloyd	2 episodes
2004–05	Super Robot Monkey Team Hyperforce Go!	Aurora Six	Voice role, 2 episodes
2005	Cold Case	Sloane Easton	Episode: "Ravaged"
2005	Out of the Woods	Linda	Television film
2005	Close to Home	Diane Walker	Episode: "Under Threat"
2007	Life	Leslie Stark	Episode: "Tear Asunder"
2008	The Cleaner	Cristina Alvarez	Episode: "Let It Ride"
2008	House Poor	Meredith	Unknown episode
2009	24	Linda Gadsen	Episode: "Day 7: 10:00 p.m.-11:00 p.m."
2009–2013	Star Wars: The Clone Wars	Barriss Offee, additional voices	Voice / recurring roles, 9 episodes
2010	Men of a Certain Age	Jessica	Episode: "Same as the Old Boss"
2011	Damages	Jessica Lowry	2 episodes
2011, 2018	Robot Chicken	Jeannie, Jyn Erso, Malika Meerkat	Voice role, 2 episodes
2011–2013	Mad	Various	Voice / recurring roles, 8 episodes
2012	Hollywood Heights	Lisa Sanders	Main role, 71 episodes
2013	Anger Management	Meredith	Episode: "Charlie Loses It at a Baby Shower"
2013	Jodi Arias: Dirty Little Secret	Jennifer Willmott	Television film
2016	Grey's Anatomy	Daphne	Episode: "My Next Life"
2016	The Perfect Daughter	Julie Cahill	Television film
2016	Star Wars Rebels	Nightsister Ghost Kanan	Voice role, episode: "Visions and Voices"
2017	Sleepovers	Barbara	Television film
2018	Daredevil	Lily Ellison	Episode: "No Good Deed"
2018	Into the Dark	Rose Tooms	Episode: "Flesh & Blood"
2019	My Little Pony: Friendship Is Magic	Clear Sky	Voice role, episode: "Common Ground"
2019	Happy!	Antonia De Sica	Episode: "Five Chicken Fingers and a Fun"
2019	Will & Grace	Lucy	Episode: "The Chick or the Egg Donor"
2020	Home Movie: The Princess Bride	Count Rugen	Episode: "Chapter Nine: Have Fun Storming the Castle"
2021	M.O.D.O.K.	Brandi, Whitney Frost	Voice role, 2 episodes
2024	Star Wars: Tales of the Empire	Barriss Offee	Voice role, 3 episodes
2026	Criminal Minds	Mrs. Ryan	Episode: "Cluster"

== Awards and nominations ==
Year	Award	Category	Title of work	Result
1986	Young Artist Award	Best Starring Performance by a Young Actress - Motion Picture	The Journey of Natty Gann	Won
1988	Saturn Award	Best Supporting Actress	The Kiss	Nominated
1989	Young Artist Award	Best Young Actress in a Motion Picture - Drama	A Night in the Life of Jimmy Reardon	Nominated
