= Larry (1974 film) =

- Genre: Drama
- Based on: Larry: Case History of a Mistake by Robert T. McQueen
- Screenplay by: David Seltzer
- Directed by: William A. Graham
- Starring: Frederic Forrest; Tyne Daly; Michael McGuire
- Music by: Peter Matz
- Country of origin: United States
- Original language: English

Production
- Executive producer: Herbert Hirschman
- Producers: Mitchell Brower; Robert Lovenheim
- Cinematography: Terry K. Meade
- Editor: Ronald J. Fagan
- Running time: 80 minutes
- Production company: Tomorrow Entertainment

Original release
- Network: CBS
- Release: April 23, 1974

Larry is a 1974 American drama film starring Frederic Forrest and Tyne Daly. It is based on Robert T. McQueen's 1973 book Larry: Case History of a Mistake.

== Plot ==
Larry Herman, a man wrongly confined in a mental hospital for his first 26 years, is discovered to have average intelligence. Upon being released, social worker Nancy Hockworth guides him in his learning process of how to cope with the real world.

== Selected cast ==
- Frederic Forrest as Larry Herman
- Tyne Daly as Nancy Hockworth
- Michael McGuire as Dr. McCabe
- Robert Walden as Tom Corman
- Katherine Helmond as Maureen Whitten
