= Home to Stay =

- Genre: Drama
- Based on: Grandpa and Frank by Janet Majerus
- Written by: Suzanne Clauser
- Directed by: Delbert Mann
- Starring: Henry Fonda; Michael McGuire; Frances Hyland; Doris Petrie
- Music by: Micky Erbe; Hagood Hardy
- Countries of origin: Canada; United States
- Original language: English

Production
- Executive producers: Frederick H. Brogger; David Susskind
- Producer: Donald W. Reid
- Production locations: Stouffville, Ontario; Toronto
- Cinematography: Reginald H. Morris
- Editors: Kent Anthony; Gene Milford
- Running time: 77 minutes
- Production companies: D.W. Reid Film Corporation; Time-Life Films
- Budget: CAD1,200,000 (estimated)

Original release
- Network: CBS
- Release: May 1, 1978

Home to Stay is a 1978 Canadian-American made-for-television drama film directed by Delbert Mann and starring Henry Fonda, Michael McGuire and Frances Hyland. It was originally broadcast on CBS on May 1, 1978.

== Plot ==
Fonda portrays an old man who runs away from home with his young granddaughter rather than be placed in an old folks home.

== Cast ==
- Henry Fonda as Grandpa George
- Michael McGuire as Frank McDermott
- Frances Hyland as Aunt Martha
- David Stambaugh as Joey Brewster
- Pixie Bigelow as Clara Hirshman
- Louis Del Grande as Richard
- Trudy Young as Hildy
- Doris Petrie as Mrs. Strickmeyer
- Eleanor Beecroft as Frances
- Kristen Vigard as Sarah
- Dave Thomas as Petrie
- David Hughes as Bill Brewster
- Judy Sinclair as Edith Brewster
- Len Doncheff as Farmer
- James D. Morris as Policeman

== Filming Locations ==
- Seagrave, Ontario: the bed and breakfast
- 12 Scugog Line: the farm
- Toronto, Ontario: the city scenes
