= Redmond Gleeson =

Irish actor (1935–2020)

- Born: Martin Gleeson; January 26, 1935; Dublin, Ireland
- Died: May 6, 2020 (aged 85)
- Occupation: Actor
- Spouse(s): Melissa Penelope Gleeson (1963–?) Mardiah Gleeson (? – present)
- Children: 9 (+1 deceased)

Redmond Gleeson (born Martin Gleeson; January 26, 1935 – May 6, 2020) was an Irish-born American stage, film, and television actor.

== Life and career ==
Martin Gleeson was born in Dublin on January 26, 1935. He won a scholarship to study theatre arts at Miami University in Ohio. After graduating he lived in Aspen, Colorado where he co-founded and acted with the High Country Players.

In 1968 he moved from Aspen to Los Angeles where he has appeared in many stage productions, including Look Homeward Angel, Buddy's Girl, for which he won a Drama-Logue Award, and Kevin's Bed, for which he won a Back Stage Garland Award.

In addition to his film and television work, he produced, directed and has acted for years in the adaptation of Bloomsday, he co-wrote with T.S. Kerrigan. Gleeson had nine children. Another, the eldest, Raynard Martin Gleeson, predeceased his parents. When not acting, Gleeson resided in Kalimantan, Indonesia with his wife, Mardiah. He died on May 6, 2020, at the age of 85.

== Filmography ==
=== Films ===
Year	Film	Role	Notes
2007	Sibling Rivalry	Redmond	Short
2006	The Tripper	Dylan/Father	
2003	A Foreign Affair	Funeral director	Released on DVD as 2 Brothers & a Bride
2002	Project Viper	Local Man	television film
2002	It Could Happen	Father Murphy	Short
2001	Hunger	Old Man	
1997	St. Patrick's Day	Thomas	
1996	Entertaining Angels: The Dorothy Day Story	Irish Man	
1992	Sinatra	Cop No. 1	TV Mini-Series
1991	Shout	Minister (credited as Redmond M. Gleeson)	
1990	Backstreet Dreams	Dempsey	
1990	Young Guns II	Murphy Man	
1990	Too Young to Die?	Janitor (credited as Redmond M. Gleeson)	television film
1988	Bulletproof	Father Riley (credited as Redmond M. Gleeson)	
1987	The Dead	Nightporter	
1986	Hollywood Harry	Skeeter	
1984	Dreamscape	Snead	
1983	Starflight: The Plane That Couldn't Land	Bud	television film, re-released on video as Starflight One
1982	Mae West	Reverend Bragg	television film
1982	Thou Shalt Not Kill		television film
1981	Sizzle	Minister	television film
1981	St. Helens	Hendricks	
1981	Cattle Annie and Little Britches	Red Buck	
1980	Alcatraz: The Whole Shocking Story	Jackson	television film
1980	A Rumor of War	Sgt. Furth	television film
1980	The Octagon	Duffy	
1979	Steel	Harry	
1979	The Best Place to Be		television film
1979	The Ordeal of Patty Hearst	Sheriff's Deputy	television film
1978	True Grit: A Further Adventure	Harrison	television film, also called True Grit: A Further Adventure
1977	Captains Courageous	Phillips	television film
1976	Pipe Dreams	Hollow Legs	
1976	Wanted: The Sundance Woman	(credited as Redmond M. Gleeson)	television film
1976	Midway	Pvt. Dombrowski – Radio Man (uncredited)	
1976	Law and Order	Rev. Martin O'Malley	television film
1975	Last Hours Before Morning	Hopkins	television film
1975	Capone	N.Y. Cop No. 2	
1974	Roll, Freddy, Roll!	Man	television film
1974	Trapped Beneath the Sea	PO1 Stanton	television film
1974	Airport 1975	Passenger (uncredited)	
1974	Mr. and Mrs. Cop	Officer Irv Pyle (credited as Redmond Gleason)	television film
1971	The Ski Bum	Head Dope Dealer	

=== Television ===
Year	Title	Role	Notes
1991	My Life and Times	Hawker	"Millennium"
1990	L.A. Law	Foreperson (credited as Redmond M. Gleeson)	"Armand's Hammer"
1989	Guns of Paradise	Judge Prine (credited as Redmond Glesson)	"A Matter of Honor: Part 1"
1987	Santa Barbara	Will Morton	Episode #1.717
1985	George Burns Comedy Week	Hanlon	"The Dynamite Girl"
1984	Weekend		TV short
1983	St. Elsewhere	Mr. Landrum	"Under Pressure"
1983	St. Elsewhere	Garth Landrum	"Entrapment"
1982	Cagney & Lacey	Sammy	"High Steel"
1981	The Dukes of Hazzard	Ben Wilkenson	"10 Million Dollar Sheriff Part 1"
1980	Lou Grant	Francie Fitzgerald	"Guns"
1979	Ike: The War Years	Riley	TV mini-series
1978	The Paper Chase	Red	"Da Da"
1976	Arthur Hailey's the Moneychangers	Vernon Jax	TV mini-series
1976	Columbo	George Thomas	"Now You See Him"
1975	Columbo	Arnold	"A Deadly State of Mind"
1975	M*A*S*H	Sergeant Callan	"Dear Ma"
1975	Kojak	Det. Houston	"How Cruel the Frost, How Bright the Stars"
1975	Cannon	Gas Station Attendant	"Coffin Corner"
1974	The Snoop Sisters	O'toole	"Black Day for Bluebeard"
