= When Every Day Was the Fourth of July =

- DVD cover art
- Genre: Drama
- Written by: Dan Curtis; Lee Hutson
- Directed by: Dan Curtis
- Starring: Dean Jones; Louise Sorel; Chris Petersen; Katy Kurtzman; Geoffrey Lewis
- Narrated by: Charles Aidman
- Music by: Walter Scharf
- Country of origin: United States
- Original language: English

Production
- Producers: Dan Curtis; Steven P. Reicher
- Cinematography: Frank Stanley
- Editor: Dennis Virkler
- Running time: 104 minutes
- Production company: Dan Curtis Productions

Original release
- Network: NBC
- Release: March 12, 1978

When Every Day Was the Fourth of July is a 1978 American made-for-television drama film about a Jewish-American family in 1937 Bridgeport, Connecticut. The film was written, produced and directed by Dan Curtis, and stars Dean Jones, Geoffrey Lewis, Chris Petersen, and Katy Kurtzman.

Narrated in first person flashback, the story follows Daniel Cooper (Petersen), a 12-year-old boy and his family who find themselves defending the town misfit Albert "Snowman" Cavanaugh (Lewis) after he is accused of murder. It was followed by the 1980 ABC television film sequel The Long Days of Summer.

== Plot ==
It's the summer of 1937 in Bridgeport, Connecticut and 12-year-old Daniel Cooper along with his 10-year-old sister Sarah are looking forward to summer vacation, most particularly, the annual 4th of July festivities. Sarah soon befriends the town's gentle misfit, Albert Cavanaugh, known by the town's children as "Snowman", a highly decorated and now brain-damaged World War I veteran, after she defends him from the town's resident bully, "Red" Doyle.

When Snowman finds himself accused of a terrible murder, Sarah, believing him to be innocent, convinces her successful attorney father, Ed Cooper to defend him. Amid courtroom allegations of communism and insinuations of a potentially inappropriate relationship with Sarah, Ed and the town's children must try to prove Snowman's innocence, before he can be convicted of the murder.

== Cast ==
- Dean Jones as Ed Cooper
- Louise Sorel as Millie Cooper
- Chris Petersen as Daniel Cooper
- Katy Kurtzman as Sarah Cooper
- Harris Yulin as Joseph Antonelli
- Geoffrey Lewis as Albert "Snowman" Cavanaugh
- Scott Brady as Officer Michael Doyle
- Ronnie Claire Edwards as Mrs. Najarian
- Ben Piazza as Herman Grasser
- Henry Wilcoxon as Judge Henry J. Wheeler
- Moosie Drier as Howie Martin
- Scott Kimble as Dave Zimmer
- Johnny Timko as Marty Albert
- Tiger Williams as Charlie Wilson
- Eric Shea as Harold J. "Red" Doyle
- Michael Durrell as Assistant District Attorney
- Bruce French as Court Clerk
- Woodrow Parfrey as Dr. Moss
- Michael Pataki as Robert Najarian
- Gloria Calomee as Clementine
- Chris Charney as Miriam Grasser
- George Janek as Bobby Najarian
- John Clavin as Sergeant Fitzgerald
- H.B. Haggerty as Casey
- Ray Nadeau as Reporter
- Charles Aidman as Narrator

== Production ==
Although fictionalized, Dan Curtis wrote the story based on his own childhood growing up in Bridgeport, Connecticut, with the character of Danny Cooper (Chris Petersen) representing himself as a child. Many of the characters are based on real people Curtis knew growing up, including Danny and Sarah (Katy Kurtzman)'s friends in the film, who are each named after Curtis' own childhood friends, however, Curtis did not have a sister, and instead, the role of Sarah was based on co-writer/producer Lee Hutson's sister of the same name.

Curtis had originally wanted to shoot the film in his childhood hometown of Bridgeport, but for financial and logistical reasons, the decision was made to film in California, using Echo Park, Los Angeles for the outdoor "neighborhood" scenes.

Just one day before principal photography was set to begin, Curtis had still yet to find a boy who was right for the part of Harold "Red" Doyle, when veteran child actor Eric Shea came in to read for the role and was hired on the spot. Seventeen years old at the time of filming, this would be Shea's final role before leaving show business. Matt Groening has stated that his first job in Los Angeles was as an extra in this film.

== Awards ==
Year	Award	Category	Recipient	Result	Ref.
1979	Edgar Allan Poe Award	Best Television Feature or Miniseries	Lee Hutson	Nominated	

== See also ==
The Long Days of Summer (1980 sequel)
