= Jan Murray =

American comedian, actor, game show host (1916–2006)

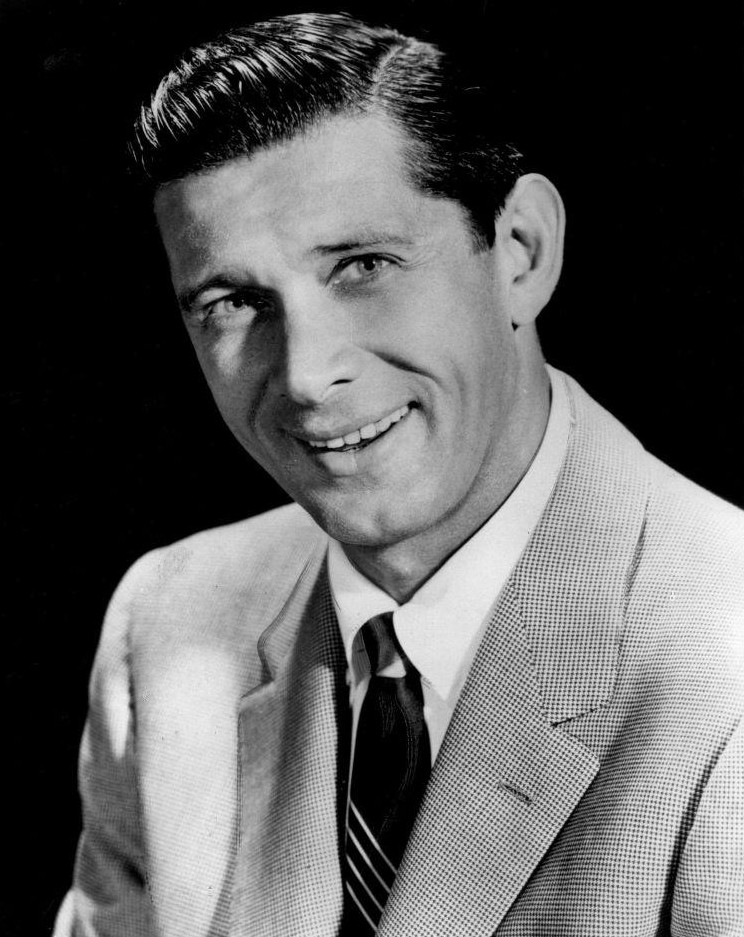
- Murray in 1961
- Born: Murray Janofsky; October 4, 1916; New York City, New York, U.S.
- Died: July 2, 2006 (aged 89); Beverly Hills, California, U.S.
- Resting place: Hillside Memorial Park Cemetery
- Occupations: Actor; comedian; game show host
- Years active: 1951–1999
- Spouse(s): Pearl Cohen (m. 1939; div. 194?) Kathleen (Toni) Mann (m. 1949)
- Children: 4

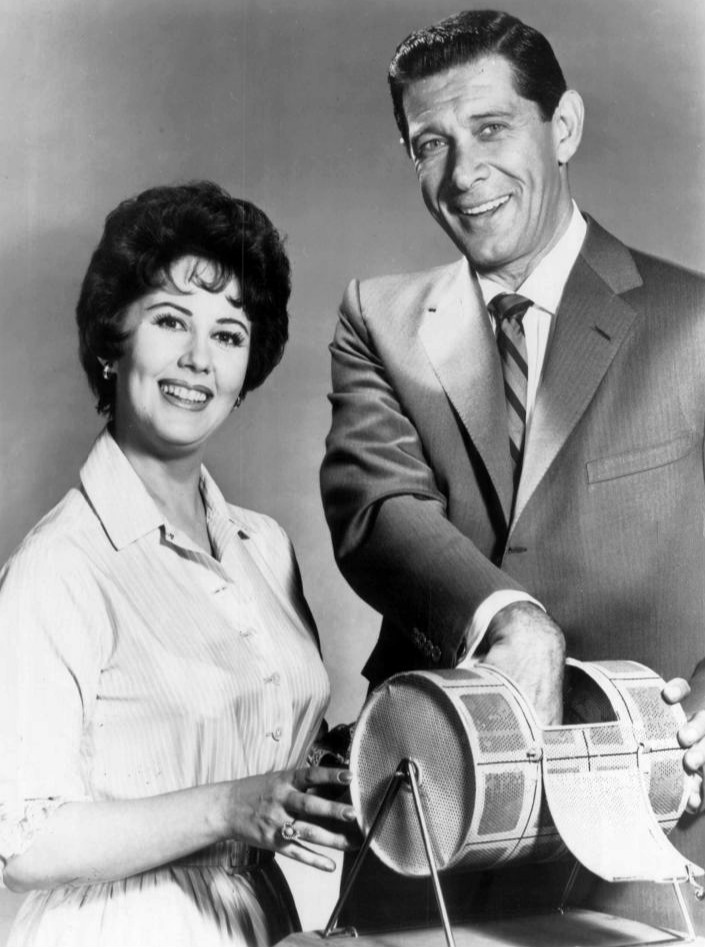
With Micki Marlo on The Jan Murray Show (1961)

Jan Murray (born Murray Janofsky; October 4, 1916 – July 2, 2006) was an American comedian, actor, and television presenter. He originally made his name on the Borscht Belt and later was known for his frequent television appearances over several decades, including as the host of several game shows.

== Early life ==
Murray was born in the Bronx, New York City, New York, to Jewish parents. His interest in comedy began during his childhood, when he would often act out comedy routines he had seen at the local theatre for his bedridden mother.

== Career ==
Murray began performing on the vaudeville stage at the age of 18. During the 1930s, he entertained at the "Borscht Belt" Catskills resorts popular with Jewish vacationers. In the 1940s and early 1950s, he became a Las Vegas marquee performer, including headlining at the Flamingo Hotel during its first year of operation.

Starting in the late 1940s, Murray moved into television, appearing several times on Texaco Star Theater hosted by Milton Berle, and later as a guest on comedy/ variety programs hosted by Jerry Lewis, Steve Allen, Garry Moore, Dean Martin, and Jackie Gleason, among others. During the 1950s and 1960s, he made numerous appearances on The Ed Sullivan Show, The Tonight Show (including several as guest host), and The Joey Bishop Show (including several as guest host). He co-hosted the annual West Coast Chabad Lubavitch telethon for 18 years.

In the 1950s and early 1960s, Murray hosted a number of TV game shows, such as Go Lucky (CBS, 1951), Blind Date (DuMont, 1953), Dollar a Second (1953–1957), his creation Treasure Hunt (1956–1959), Charge Account (also known as The Jan Murray Show, 1960–1962), and Chain Letter (1966). Between 1966 and 1980, he was a regular panelist on The Hollywood Squares, appearing in nearly 250 episodes. He appeared as a participant on many game shows that featured celebrities, including Funny You Should Ask, Match Game, Celebrity Bowling, Celebrity Sweepstakes, and Break the Bank (1976).

From the 1960s through the 1980s, Murray had acting roles in episodes of many TV comedy and drama series, including Dr. Kildare; The Lucy Show; The Man From U.N.C.L.E.; The Name of the Game; Love, American Style; Mannix; Kolchak: The Night Stalker; Fantasy Island; The Fall Guy; and Hardcastle and McCormick. He appeared playing himself on a 1962 episode of the police comedy Car 54, Where Are You? and also played himself on a 1964 episode of the courtroom drama The Defenders. In 1977, he appeared in the final episode of the NBC situation comedy The Practice. His last TV acting role was as Uncle Raymond on a 1989 episode of My Two Dads.

Murray also occasionally acted in films, including Of Love and Desire (1963), Who Killed Teddy Bear? (1965), The Busy Body (1967), Tarzan and the Great River (1967), Thunder Alley (1967), A Man Called Dagger (1968), Which Way to the Front? (1970), The Day of the Wolves (1971), Roll, Freddy, Roll! (1974 TV movie), The Dream Merchants (1980 TV miniseries), and Mel Brooks' History of the World, Part I (1981).

Murray retired from show business at the age of 83, as he felt his asthma was affecting his timing.

== Honors ==
For his career contributions to television, Murray received a star on the Hollywood Walk of Fame in 1960.

A Golden Palm Star on the Palm Springs, California, Walk of Stars was also dedicated to him, in 1997.

== Personal life ==
Murray married Pearl Cohen in 1939, and had a child with her, but they later divorced. In October 1949, he married Kathleen (Toni) Mann, had three children with her, and remained married to her until his death. Murray's production company, Jantone, took its name from their first names.

Murray was an avid golfer and had many fellow comedians as partners. Among them were Jack Carter, Jerry Lewis, Joey Bishop, and others, from whom he created comedy routines often related at various golf charity events. He chaired the Comedians' Golf Classic for several years, held both in New York and California.

=== Death ===
Murray died at the age of 89 in Beverly Hills, California, on July 2, 2006. He is entombed at the Hillside Memorial Park Cemetery in Culver City, California.

== Partial filmography ==
- Of Love and Desire (1963) – Pete Madsen
- Who Killed Teddy Bear? (1965) – Lt. Dave Madden
- The Busy Body (1967) – Murray Foster
- Tarzan and the Great River (1967) – Captain Sam Bishop
- Thunder Alley (1967) – Pete Madsen
- A Man Called Dagger (1968, filmed in 1966) – Rudolph Koffman / Hans Leitel
- The Angry Breed (1968) – Mori Thompson
- Which Way to the Front? (1970) – Sid Hackle
- The Day of the Wolves (1971) – No. 1
- Roll, Freddy, Roll! (1974) - Big Sid Kane
- Kolchak: The Night Stalker (1974) – Ichabod Grace
- History of the World, Part I (1981) – Nothing Vendor – The French Revolution
