= Dean Jones (actor) =

American actor (1931–2015)

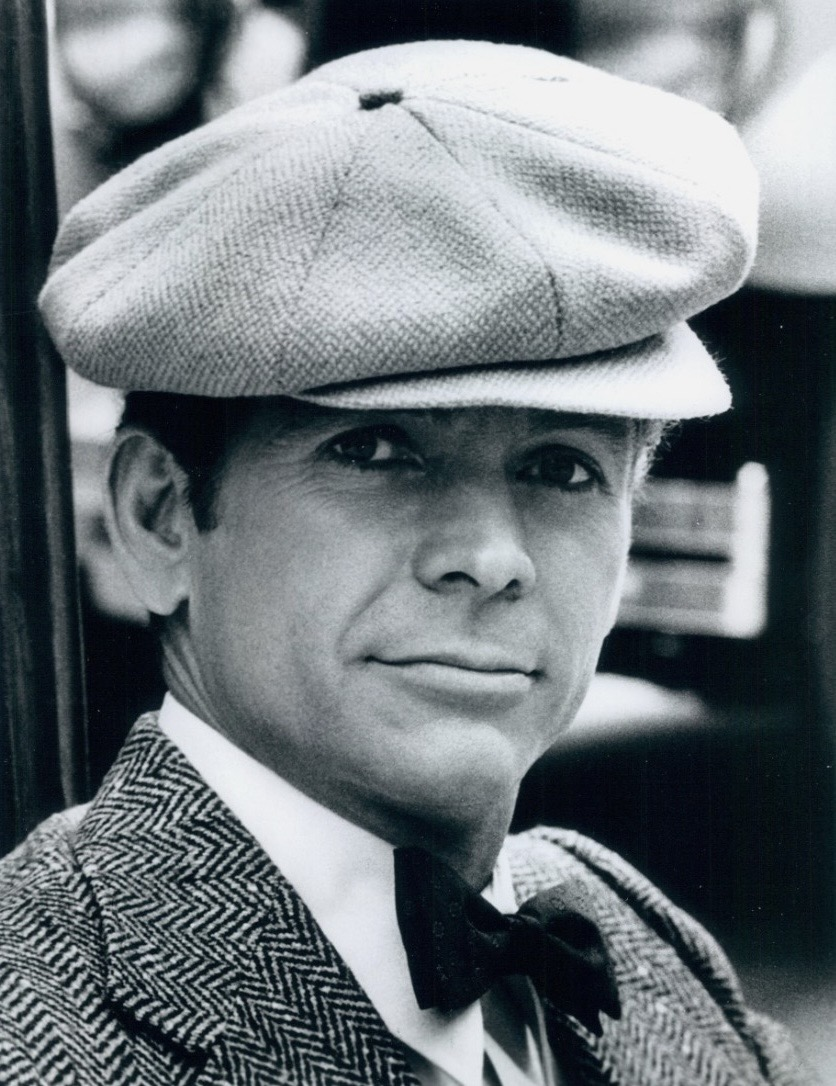
- Jones in The Chicago Teddy Bears, 1971
- Born: Dean Carroll Jones; January 25, 1931; Decatur, Alabama, U.S.
- Died: September 1, 2015 (aged 84); Los Angeles, California, U.S.
- Occupation: Actor
- Years active: 1955–2009
- Spouses: Mae Entwisle (m. 1954; div. 1971); Loretta Basham (m. 1973)
- Children: 2

Dean Carroll Jones (January 25, 1931 – September 1, 2015) was an American actor. He was best known as the Walt Disney Company's main leading man in the 1970s with his roles as Agent Zeke Kelso in That Darn Cat! (1965), Jim Douglas in the Herbie franchise (1969–1997), and with other film companies such as Dr. Herman Varnick in Beethoven (1992). He was nominated for a Golden Globe Award for his performance as Albert Dooley in The Million Dollar Duck (1971). In 1995, he was inducted as a Disney Legend for his film work.

== Early life ==
Jones was born on January 25, 1931, in Decatur, Alabama, to Andrew Guy Jones, a traveling construction worker, and the former Nolia Elizabeth Wilhite.

As a student at Riverside High School in Decatur, Jones had his own local radio show, Dean Jones Sings. He served in the U.S. Navy during the Korean War, and after his discharge worked at the Bird Cage Theater at Knott's Berry Farm in Buena Park, California.

Jones attended Asbury College in Wilmore near Lexington, Kentucky. A member of its Class of 1953, he did not graduate, but the university in 2003 awarded him an honorary degree. On March 4, 2011, he addressed the community during the dedication ceremony of Asbury's Andrew S. Miller Center for Communications Arts.

== Stage ==
After appearing in minor film and television roles, Jones made his Broadway debut in the 1960 play There Was a Little Girl. He stepped into the role in Boston, with only one day's notice. In 1960, he also played Dave Manning in the Broadway comedy Under the Yum-Yum Tree, a role he repeated in the 1963 film version starring Jack Lemmon and Carol Lynley.

After working in film and television, Jones was set to return to Broadway as the star of Stephen Sondheim's musical Company in 1970. Shortly after opening night, he withdrew from the show, due to stress that he was undergoing from ongoing divorce proceedings. Director Harold Prince agreed to replace him with Larry Kert if Jones would open the show and record the cast album. He agreed, and his performance is preserved on the original cast album, although it was Kert who received the Tony nomination for Best Actor in a Musical.

In 1986, Jones, by then having become a fervent born-again Christian, starred in Into the Light, a musical about scientists and the Shroud of Turin, which closed after only six performances.He had far more success touring in the one-man show St. John in Exile as the last surviving Apostle of Jesus Christ, reminiscing about his life while imprisoned on the Greek island of Patmos. One performance was filmed in 1986. He made one more Broadway appearance, in 1993, at the Vivian Beaumont Theater, in a special two-day concert staging of Company featuring most of the original Broadway cast.

== Television and film ==
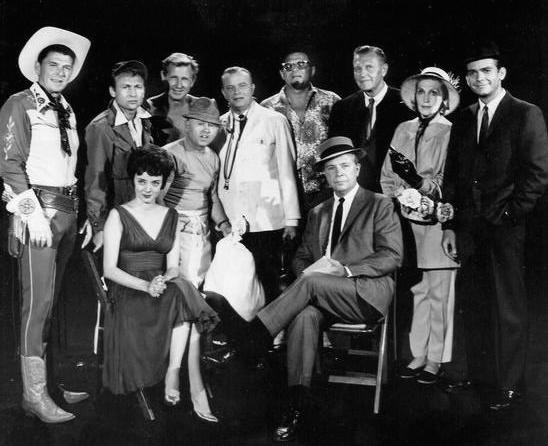
Guest stars for the premiere episode of The Dick Powell Show, "Who Killed Julie Greer?" Standing, from left: Ronald Reagan, Nick Adams, Lloyd Bridges, Mickey Rooney, Edgar Bergen, Jack Carson, Ralph Bellamy, Kay Thompson, Dean Jones. Seated, from left, Carolyn Jones and Dick Powell.

Jones began as a contract performer for MGM, beginning with a small role as a soldier in Somebody Up There Likes Me (1956) and he later played disc jockey Teddy Talbot in the Elvis Presley film Jailhouse Rock (1957). He portrayed a soldier in both Imitation General (also 1957) with Glenn Ford and Never So Few (1959) with Frank Sinatra. He gave a powerful performance as an ex-con trying to reform (with Joe's help) on Bonanza Season 3 Episode 8 "The Friendship" which aired on November 11, 1961.

Jones subsequently starred in the NBC television sitcom Ensign O'Toole (1962–63), produced by Four Star Television, portraying an easygoing and inexperienced officer on a U.S. Navy destroyer. His costars included Jack Mullaney, Jack Albertson, Jay C. Flippen, Harvey Lembeck, and Beau Bridges. He also recorded a singing album, Introducing Dean Jones, for Valiant Records.

As Ensign O'Toole was the lead-in show on NBC to Walt Disney's The Wonderful World of Color, Disney ordered a print of Jones' latest film Under the Yum Yum Tree to study. Disney signed Jones for Disney film productions beginning with That Darn Cat!. His performance was well-received. Jones continued with Disney for many years, starring in films such as The Ugly Dachshund (1966), Monkeys, Go Home! (1966), Blackbeard's Ghost (1968), The Horse in the Gray Flannel Suit (1968). The Love Bug (1969), The Million Dollar Duck (1971), Snowball Express (1972), The Shaggy D.A. (1976), and Herbie Goes to Monte Carlo (1977).

Jones' signature Disney role would be as race car driver Jim Douglas in the successful Herbie series. In addition to the two feature films, Jones starred in the short-lived television series Herbie, the Love Bug (1982) and the television film The Love Bug (1997). In 1969, he was the host of a short-lived sketch-comedy hour on ABC-TV titled What's It All About, World? that became a variety show midway into its run, when the title was changed to The Dean Jones Variety Hour.

Away from Disney, Jones costarred with Broadway-era co-star Jane Fonda in the romantic comedy Any Wednesday (1966). In a dramatic turn, in the NBC television film When Every Day Was the Fourth of July (1978) he portrayed Ed Cooper, an attorney in the 1930s who agrees to defend a man who has been accused of murder, accepting the case only after urging from his daughter. He reprised the role of Ed Cooper in the ABC television sequel The Long Days of Summer (1980). He appeared with Gregory Peck and Danny DeVito as Bill Coles, the president of Peck's company, which was fighting a hostile takeover by DeVito, in Other People's Money (1991).

Jones, who was known for playing pleasant characters, took on the role of Dr. Herman Varnick, the evil veterinarian in the family film Beethoven (1992). He employed method acting for the first time in his career and did not break character off-set throughout the film's shooting period much to the surprise of cast members as well as family and friends who had never seen him so immersed in a role. He maintained his relationship to the Beethoven franchise by providing the voice of George Newton in the animated television version of Beethoven. He also appeared in a small role as Director of Central Intelligence Judge Arthur Moore in the film adaptation of Tom Clancy's Clear and Present Danger (1994), which starred Harrison Ford.

He also played Kelly Kapowski's grandfather Harry Bannister in the 1992 film Saved By The Bell: Hawaiian Style.

Jones also appeared in two episodes of the Angela Lansbury series Murder, She Wrote in 1984 and 1988.

== Personal life ==
Jones was married to Mae Entwisle from 1954 to 1971; the couple had two daughters. He was married to actress Lory Patrick from 1973 until his death in 2015.

Jones became a born-again Christian in 1973 or 1974. His book Under Running Laughter (1982) recounts his experience of Christianity. He had previously suffered from bouts of depression. His wife, Lory, said, "One night he got down on his knees and prayed that God would free him from the miserable moods that he had always suffered. He told me that in an instant it was gone and he felt peace and joy flood into his heart."

Jones appeared in several Christian films. In 1977 he portrayed Charles Colson in the feature film Born Again. He voiced the narrator in Birdwing Records' 1979 studio album Nathaniel the Grublet. Jones also voiced the standard English narration for the 80-minute Bible overview God's Story: From Creation to Eternity, and was the voice of Father Tim for Focus on the Family Radio Theatre audio drama At Home in Mitford in 2003.

In July 1994, Jones was a guest on 100 Huntley Street, a Canadian Christian discussion program.

In 1998, Jones founded the Christian Rescue Committee (CRC), an organization that helps provide a "way of escape to Jews, Christians, and others persecuted for their faith".

=== Death ===
Jones died of Parkinson's disease in Los Angeles on September 1, 2015, at age 84. His remains were cremated.

== Filmography ==
=== Film ===
Year	Title	Role	Notes
1956	Somebody Up There Likes Me	Private in Rocky's Tent	Uncredited
1956	These Wilder Years	Hardware Clerk	
1956	Tea and Sympathy	Ollie	
1956	The Opposite Sex	Assistant Stage Manager	Uncredited
1956	The Rack	Lieutenant	Uncredited
1956	The Great American Pastime	Buck Rivers	
1957	Slander	Newscaster	Uncredited
1957	Ten Thousand Bedrooms	Dan	
1957	Designing Woman	Assistant Stage Manager (Boston)	Uncredited
1957	Until They Sail	US Marine Lieutenant	Uncredited
1957	Jailhouse Rock	Teddy Talbot	
1958	Handle with Care	Zachary Davis	
1958	Imitation General	Cpl. Terry Sellers	
1958	Torpedo Run	Lieutenant Jake "Fuzz" Foley	
1959	Night of the Quarter Moon	Lexington Nelson	
1959	Never So Few	Sgt. Jim Norby	
1963	Under the Yum Yum Tree	David Manning	
1964	The New Interns	Dr. Lew Worship	
1965	Two on a Guillotine	Val Henderson	
1965	That Darn Cat!	FBI Agent Zeke Kelso	
1966	The Ugly Dachshund	Mark Garrison	
1966	Any Wednesday	Cass Henderson	
1967	Monkeys, Go Home!	Hank Dussard	
1968	Blackbeard's Ghost	Steve Walker	
1968	The Horse in the Gray Flannel Suit	Fred Bolton	
1969	The Love Bug	Jim Douglas	
1970	Mr. Superinvisible	Peter Denwell	
1971	The Million Dollar Duck	Professor Albert Dooley	
1972	Snowball Express	Johnny Baxter	
1976	The Shaggy D.A.	Wilby Daniels	
1977	Herbie Goes to Monte Carlo	Jim Douglas	
1978	Born Again	Charles Colson	
1986	St. John in Exile	St. John	
1991	Other People's Money	Bill Coles	
1992	Beethoven	Dr. Herman Varnick	
1994	Clear and Present Danger	Judge Arthur Moore	
1994	The Visual Bible: Acts	Luke the Evangelist	
1996	A spasso nel tempo	Professor Mortimer, Joe	
1997	That Darn Cat	Mr. Flint	
1998	Batman & Mr. Freeze: SubZero	Dean Arbagast	Voice, direct-to-video
2007	Lavinia's Heist	Tony Cavaletti	Short film
2009	Mandie and the Secret Tunnel	Jason Bond	
2009	God Provides	Abraham	Direct-to-video film (final film role)

=== Television ===
Year	Title	Role	Notes
1960	Zane Grey Theatre	Deputy Bill Devlin	Episode: "The Sunday Man"
1960	The Aquanauts	John Anderson	Episode: "The Stowaway"
1960	Outlaws	Danny Cannon	Episode: "Beat the Drum Slowly"
1960	Stagecoach West	Joe Brady	Episode: "Red Sand"
1961	The Dick Powell Show	Detective Phil Winslow	Episode: "Who Killed Julie Greer?"
1961	Bonanza	Danny Kidd	Episode: "The Friendship"
1961	Tales of Wells Fargo	Jamie Coburn	Episode: "A Killing in Calico"
1962	Target: The Corruptors!	Barry Steele	Episode: "Play It Blue"
1962	Wagon Train	Lt. Burton	Episode: "The Lieutenant Burton Story"
1962–1963	Ensign O'Toole	Ensign O'Toole	Main role (32 episodes)
1963	Ben Casey	Dr. Richard Connell	Episode: "Fire in a Sacred Fruit Tree"
1963	Burke's Law	Rudy Davis	Episode: "Who Killed Eleanora Davis?"
1965	Kraft Suspense Theatre	Eddie Carew	Episode: "The Rise and Fall of Eddie Carew"
1965	Vacation Playhouse	Alec Tate	Episode: "Alec Tate"
1968	Walt Disney's Wonderful World of Color	Narrator	Voice, episode: "The Mickey Mouse Anniversary Show"
1971	The Chicago Teddy Bears	Linc McCray	Main role (13 episodes)
1972	The Great Man's Whiskers	James E. Cooper	Television film
1973	Guess Who's Sleeping in My Bed?	George Gregory	Television film
1973	Walt Disney: A Golden Anniversary Salute	Himself – Host	Television special
1974	Medical Center	Dr. Ronston	Episode: "Spectre"
1976	Good Heavens	Brad	Episode: "Coffee, Tea, or Gloria"
1977	Once Upon a Brothers Grimm	Jacob Grimm / Grandmother	Television film
1978	When Every Day Was the Fourth of July	Ed Cooper	Television film
1978	The Wonderful World of Disney	Himself – Guest star	Episode: "Mickey's 50"
1980	The Long Days of Summer	Ed Cooper	Television film
1981	Aloha Paradise	Alex	Episode: "Alex and Annie"
1982	Kraft Salutes Walt Disney World's 10th Anniversary	Mr. Lane	Television special
1982	Herbie, the Love Bug	Jim Douglas	Main role (5 episodes)
1983	The Gospel According to Scrooge	Narrator	Television film
1984	Don't Ask Me, Ask God	Future Father	Television special
1984	The Love Boat	Marty Chenault	Episode: "Julie and the Producer" (Part 1 & 2)
1984	Finder of Lost Loves	Steve Marsh	Episode: "Yesterday's Child"
1984	Murder, She Wrote	Marcus Boswell	Episode: "It's a Dog's Life"
1988	Murder, She Wrote	Leonard Palmer	Episode: "Harbinger of Death"
1989	Fire and Rain	Jack Ayers	Television film
1992	The Greatest Adventure: Stories from the Bible	Ahasuerus	Voice, episode: "Queen Esther"
1992	Saved by the Bell: Hawaiian Style	Harry Bannister	Television film
1994	Beethoven	George Newton	Voice, main role (26 episodes)
1995	The Computer Wore Tennis Shoes	Dean Webster Carlson	Television film
1995	Nowhere Man	Jonathan Crane	Episode: "Father"
1996	Special Report: Journey to Mars	Dr. Scott Berlin	Television film
1996	The Real Adventures of Jonny Quest	Dr. Karel	Voice, episode: "DNA Doomsday"
1997	Nightmare Ned	Abraham Lincoln	Episode: "Monster Ned"
1997	Superman: The Animated Series	Sam Lane	Voice, episode: "Monkey Fun"
1997	The Love Bug	Jim Douglas	Television film
1998	Adventures from the Book of Virtues	Chauncey	Voice, episode: "Trustworthiness"
2001	Scrooge & Marley	Ebenezer Scrooge	Television film

== Stage productions ==
Dates	Title	Role	Theatre venue
February 29, 1960 – March 12, 1960	There Was a Little Girl	Stan Walters	Cort Theatre
November 16, 1960 – April 15, 1961	Under the Yum Yum Tree	Dave Manning	Henry Miller's Theatre
April 26, 1970 – May 28, 1970	Company	Robert	Alvin Theatre
October 22, 1986 – October 26, 1986	Into the Light	James Prescott	Neil Simon Theatre
April 11, 1993 – April 12, 1993	Company	Robert	Vivian Beaumont Theater
