= Roll, Freddy, Roll! =

1974 film by Bill Persky

- Genre: Comedy
- Written by: Bill Persky; Sam Denoff
- Directed by: Bill Persky
- Starring: Tim Conway; Jan Murray; Moosie Drier; Barra Grant; Scott Brady; Robert J. Hogan; Ruta Lee
- Music by: Jack Elliott; Allyn Ferguson
- Country of origin: United States
- Original language: English

Production
- Producers: Bill Persky; Sam Denoff
- Cinematography: John Morley Stephens
- Editor: Jerry Shepard
- Production company: ABC Circle Films

Original release
- Network: ABC
- Release: December 17, 1974

Roll, Freddy, Roll! is a 1974 American comedy television film directed by Bill Persky and starring Tim Conway.

== Synopsis ==
Freddy is a computer engineer working at Menlo Computer Machine. His secretary notifies him that his ex-wife had a whirlwind romance with flamboyant, successful used car dealer Big Sid and is marrying him in days. Freddy agrees to take in Tommy, his eight-year-old son, while they're on their honeymoon. He meets them at Sid's opulent mansion, where he also meets Sid's attractive daughter, Sidni.

Tommy comes to idolize Big Sid for his wealth, while the low-key Freddie feels inadequate and fumes. Mr. Menlo is depending on Freddy to convince Admiral Norton to buy a $10 million mainframe computer, but the gung-ho officer is unimpressed by computers. Freddy's co-worker Don hatches a plan to use the computer to predict football game results that will allow Norton to win his betting pool. It succeeds, and Freddy uses his newfound connection with the admiral to request a visit to a navy ship for himself and Tommy.

Big Sid lands a world-record bluefin tuna while fishing on his honeymoon, which Freddy resents even more. Sid returns early with an idea to run an event on his car lot where people can try to break records of all types. Freddy and Tommy's visit to the USS Enterprise is cancelled as the aircraft carrier is delayed at sea by bad weather, so he takes Tommy to a roller skating rink. Tommy would rather go to Big Sid's record event and Freddy finally acquiesces. But the rink has lost his shoes. When the rink's owner questions whether Freddy came in wearing shoes, an exasperated Freddy leaves wearing the skates, vowing not to return them until he gets his shoes back.

At Big Sid's, a news crew mistakes Freddy for one of the record-seekers and interviews him. Freddy calls the rink and finds out they have recovered his shoes. As he's about to change out of his skates, he sees his interview on the snack bar television. Other customers are impressed and wish him luck, which makes him think he can impress Tommy with the record. He returns the shoes, promising to pick them up after he has broken the endurance record in another 142 hours.

Driving home, his skates jam on the pedals and he's stopped by a police officer, who eventually comes to understand and drives him the rest of the way. Without a car, he tells Tommy to take a taxi to go to his apartment. Sidni drives him instead and they have dinner together. Tommy is impressed by his dad's record attempt.

At Menlo, Freddy's co-workers are incredulous and Mr. Menlo is furious, especially as Freddy's skates mark his office floor. He gives Freddy an ultimatum to remove the skates, but after thinking it over, Freddy decides to stand up for himself and quits. He spends the next few days looking for a new job as well as skating everywhere. Admiral Norton calls Don, looking for the computer's predictions for the coming weekend. When told that Freddy has quit, he refuses to recommend the purchase. Mr. Menlo grudgingly re-hires Freddy, who demands a promotion to head of the research department. Freddy feigns an injury and uses a wheelchair to avoid being seen skating during the presentation to the admirals.

Immediately after the presentation, Freddy hastily skates to meet a news crew on the street to be certified for the record. His family watches on TV, reacting in horror as he helplessly rolls backward down a ramp at the end of the interview. After a madcap careen down hilly streets, he hits the side of a tour bus, ending up in a full body cast. Sidni informs him he has been given three world records: for the length of time on skates, for the highest speed on skates (over 70 mph) and for breaking the most bones in one accident, beating Evel Knievel's record.

== Cast ==
- Tim Conway as Freddy Danton
- Jan Murray as Big Sid Kane
- Moosie Drier as Tommy Danton
- Barra Grant as Sidni Kane
- Scott Brady as Adm. Norton
- Robert J. Hogan as Don Talbert
- Ruta Lee as Evelyn Danton Kane
- Henry Jones as Theodore Menlo
- Danny Wells as Skating Rink Attendant
- Edwina Gough as Rita
- Sam Denoff as Gas Station Attendant
- Richard Caine as Policeman
- Richard Patterson as Ted Comden
- Ed Peck as Adm. Frigate
- Clifford A. Pellow as Guard
- Roy West as Announcer L.A.
- Patti Heider as Cashier
- Richmond Shepard as Pogo Stick Champion
- Diane Sommerfield as Helen
- Wally Dalton as Counterman
- Redmond Gleeson as Man

== See also ==
- List of American films of 1974
