= Katy Kurtzman =

American actress

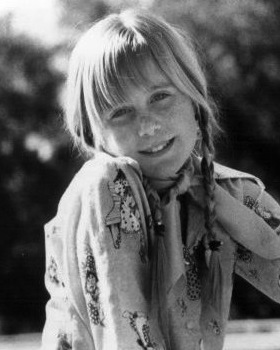
- Kurtzman, circa 1977
- Born: September 16, 1965 (age 60); Washington, D.C., U.S.
- Occupation: Actress
- Years active: 1976–2013

Katy Kurtzman (born September 16, 1965) is an American actress and modelist.

== Biography ==
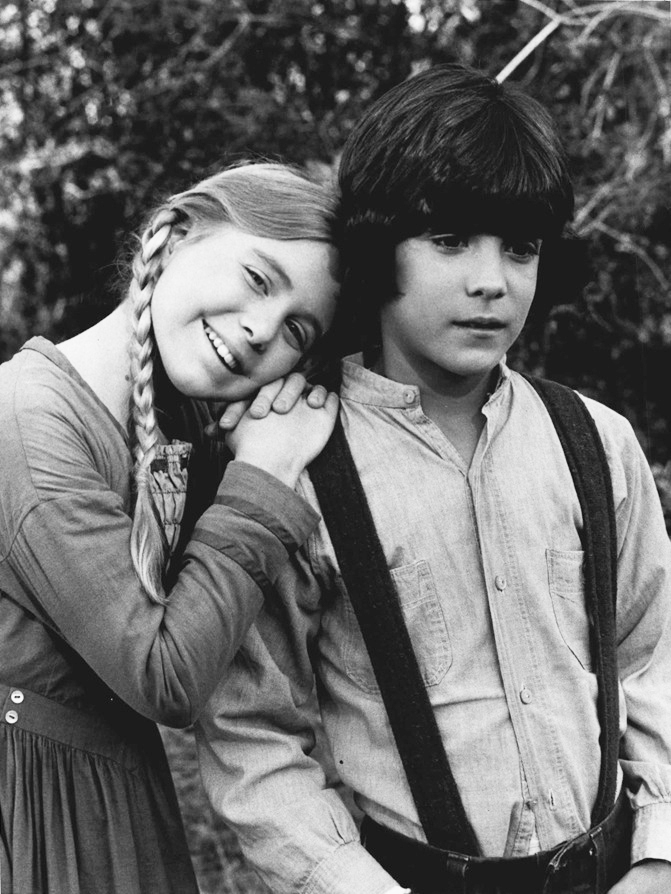
Kurtzman and Matthew Labyorteaux on Little House on the Prairie, 1977

Born on September 16, 1965 in Washington, D.C., Kurtzman was, by her own account, an exceedingly shy child, a fact which, she further acknowledged, was at least indirectly responsible for her becoming an actress, inasmuch as it was while attending the "drama lessons" in which Kurtzman's mother had enrolled her for the purpose of lessening that shyness that she first caught the acting bug.

Kurtzman began her career as a child actress. In 1977, Michael Landon cast Kurtzman as stuttering Anna (who was abused by Nellie) in the third-season episode "The Music Box" on Little House on the Prairie. She also starred in the "Little House on the Prairie" fourth season episode "I Remember, I Remember" with Matthew Labyorteaux, playing young Caroline and young Charles, respectively. This episode aired on January 23, 1978, and is Production No. 4016.

She is probably best remembered for her roles as Heidi in The New Adventures of Heidi (1978) and as Lindsay Blaisdel in the television drama Dynasty (1981). She starred in the NBC pilot Allison Sydney Harrison with Ted Danson, playing an amateur detective. She played Nettie in episode 21 (The Scavengers) of How the West Was Won. In 2001, she wrote and directed the 14-minute short titled The Pool Boy. Her most recent acting role came in 2013 when she guest-starred on an episode of Grey's Anatomy.

== Filmography ==
- Little House on the Prairie (1977 and 1978) (TV)
- Mulligan's Stew (1977)
- ABC Afterschool Specials - Very Good Friends/Beat The Turtle Drum (1977)
- The Awakening Land (1978)
- When Every Day Was the Fourth of July (1978)
- Child of Glass (1978)
- Hunters of the Reef (1978)
- The New Adventures of Heidi (1978)
- Long Journey Back (1978)
- Donovan's Kid (1979)
- Sex and the Single Parent (1979)
- Diary of a Teenage Hitchhiker (1979)
- Hawaii Five-0 (1979)
- Trapper John, M.D. (1980)
- Dynasty (1981)
- God, Sex & Apple Pie (1998)
- Out in Fifty (1999)
- The Pool Boy (2001)
- Strong Medicine (2004)
- Grey's Anatomy (2013)
