= Into the Light (musical) =

- A Musical in 2 Acts
- Broadway Playbill cover
- Music: Lee Holdridge
- Lyrics: John Forster
- Book: Jeff Tambornino
- Setting: Los Alamos
- Premiere: October 22, 1986: Neil Simon Theatre
- Productions: 1986 Broadway

Into the Light is a short-lived musical about a physicist who attempts to determine the truth behind the Shroud of Turin. His quest for the truth eventually takes a toll on his relationships with his wife and son.

== Synopsis ==
A physicist from Los Alamos, James Prescott is attempting to prove (or disprove) the truth about the Shroud of Turin. James' obsession with this task strains his relationship with his wife (Kate) and his young son (Matthew). To compensate for his absent father, Matthew instead begins to trust his imaginary friend.

== Musical Numbers ==
Act 1
- Prologue: Poltergiests - Matthew, Kate
- Neat/Not Neat - James, Father Frank, Kate
- It Can All Be Explained - James, Father Frank
- The Data - James, The Team
- A Talk About Time - James, Kate
- Trading Solos - Father Frank, Matthew, Friend
- Let There Be Light - James, Don, Father Frank, Signor Bocciarelli, Archbishop Parisi
- Wishes - Matthew
- The Three of Us - Kate, James
- Rainbow Logic - James

Act 2

- Fede Fede - Don, Archbishop Parisi, Team
- To Measure the Darkness - James, Kate
- The Testing - James, Team
- The Rose and I - Kate
- The Testing (continued) - James, Team
- Measure the Darkness (reprise) - James
- Be There - James, Matthew
- Epilogue: Into the Light - Company

== Productions ==
=== 1986 Broadway ===
The show previewed at the Fisher Theatre in Detroit, opening September 9, 1986 and running through October 4.

It opened at the Neil Simon Theatre on October 22, 1986 and closed on October 26, 1986 after playing 13 previews and 6 performances. It starred Dean Jones as James Prescott. The production was directed by Michael Maurer, with choreography from Mary Jane Houdina and music direction from Peter Howard. The production team consisted of Neil Peter Jampolis (Scenic/Projection/Lighting Design), Hervig Libowitzky (Scenic/Projection Design), Karen Roston (Costume Design), and Jack Mann (Sound Design).

Character	Original Broadway Production
James Prescott	Dean Jones
Archbishop Parisi	Thomas Batten
Kate Prescott	Susan Bigelow
Paul Cooper	Alan Brasington
Colonel	Ted Forlow
Matthew Prescott	Danny Gerard
Vijay Bannerjee	Mitchell Greenberg
Phyllis Terwillinger	Kathryn McAteer
Friend	Alan Mintz
Father Frank Girella	William Parry
Don Cesare	Casper Roos
Signor Bocciarelli	Gordon Stanley
Nathan Gelb	Peter Walker
Peter Vonn	Lenny Wolpe
Major/Ensemble	David Young
Ensemble	Valerie De Pena
Ensemble	Michael Duran
Ensemble	Terri Homberg

=== Critical reception ===
The Detroit production received universally poor reviews. In the Detroit Free Press, Lawrence DeVine said "...the musical in its guts lacks genuine character." and that the book had an inability to get beyond the commonplace. Christopher Potter of The Ann Arbor News predicted "In its present, floundering form, "Into the Light" won't last a week on Broadway without first undergoing radical surgery during its three hurried weeks at the Fisher." Other reviews cited an improbable premise and lousy lyrics as the show's downfall.

Upon opening on Broadway, Frank Rich of The New York Times called the solemn staging "more appropriate to a requiem than a musical entertainment," and the Italian clerics "clownish" adding "The creative team at hand tries and fails to conquer the meaning of the universe with esthetic means that would be a tad lightweight for The Tap Dance Kid." In the New York Daily News, Howard Kissel states "But you don't need faith or scientific data to know that 'Into the Light', a musical in which the Shroud plays a key role, is fake through and through. He also lambasts the laser effects in the show saying, "Flashy technology is invariably a way to camouflage the lack of solid ideas.
