= Michael McGuire (actor) =

American actor (1930–2017)

- Born: Michael J. McGuire; June 30, 1930; Wisconsin, U.S.
- Died: December 15, 2017 (aged 87); Burbank, California, U.S.
- Occupation: Actor
- Years active: 1968–2008

Michael J. McGuire (June 30, 1930 – December 15, 2017) was an American film, television and theatre actor.

== Life and career ==
McGuire was born in Wisconsin. He attended Beloit College. He began his stage career in 1964, appearing in the Broadway play The Passion of Josef D. He appeared in such other Broadway plays as Child's Play, Hay Fever, and That Championship Season, for which he won a Drama Desk Award for Outstanding Performance, shared with Charles Durning, Walter McGinn, Richard Dysart and Paul Sorvino, in 1972. He also received an Outer Critics Circle Award for the same performance.

McGuire began his screen career in 1968, playing Dr. Bryan Angell in the television soap opera One Life to Live. From the 1970s to the 2000s McGuire guest-starred in television programs including Hawaii Five-O, The Six Million Dollar Man, Columbo, Mannix, Kojak, Wonder Woman, The Streets of San Francisco, The Rockford Files, Taxi, The Long Days of Summer, Family Ties, All in the Family, M*A*S*H, The Golden Girls, Knots Landing, Dark Shadows, Newhart, Remington Steele, Highway to Heaven and The West Wing. He also appeared as Professor Sumner Sloan in three episodes of Cheers, including the pilot episode. He also starred in the short-lived comedy series Empire.

McGuire's film credits include Coming Apart, They Might Be Giants, The Ballad of Gregorio Cortez, Blade, Larry, Report to the Commissioner, Hard Times, The Hunted Lady, The Great Wallendas, Home to Stay, Like Normal People, Sanctuary of Fear, The Ordeal of Dr. Mudd, Blinded by the Light, Jekyll and Hyde... Together Again, Bird, The Karen Carpenter Story, and A More Perfect Union: America Becomes a Nation.

McGuire retired in 2008, last appearing in the Broadway play August: Osage County, as the patriarch Beverly Weston.

== Death ==
McGuire died in Burbank, California on December 15, 2017, at the age of 87.

== Partial filmography ==
- Coming Apart (1969)
- Where's Poppa? (1970)
- They Might Be Giants (1971)
- Blade (1973)
- Larry (1974)
- The Gun (1974)
- Report to the Commissioner (1975)
- Hard Times (1975)
- The Keegans (1976)
- The Hunted Lady (1977)
- The Great Wallendas (1978)
- Home to Stay (1978)
- Like Normal People (1979)
- Sanctuary of Fear (1979)
- The Ordeal of Dr. Mudd (1980)
- The Long Days of Summer (1980)
- Blinded by the Light (1980)
- The Ballad of Gregorio Cortez (1982)
- Partners (1982)
- Jekyll and Hyde... Together Again (1982)
- Shakedown on the Sunset Strip (1988)
- Bird (1988)
- The Karen Carpenter Story (1989)
- A More Perfect Union: America Becomes a Nation (1989)
- The Golden Girls (1989), episodes: "Sick and Tired", parts 1 and 2
