= Under the Yum Yum Tree =

1963 film by David Swift

- Theatrical release poster
- Directed by: David Swift
- Screenplay by: Lawrence Roman; David Swift
- Based on: Under the Yum Yum Tree; 1960 play by Lawrence Roman
- Produced by: Frederick Brisson
- Starring: Jack Lemmon; Carol Lynley; Dean Jones; Edie Adams; Imogene Coca; Paul Lynde; Robert Lansing
- Cinematography: Joseph Biroc
- Edited by: Charles Nelson
- Music by: Frank De Vol
- Production company: Sonnis
- Distributed by: Columbia Pictures
- Release date: October 23, 1963
- Running time: 110 minutes
- Country: United States
- Language: English
- Box office: $5 million (US and Canada rentals)

Under the Yum Yum Tree is a 1963 American romantic sex comedy film directed by David Swift and starring Jack Lemmon, Carol Lynley, Dean Jones, and Edie Adams, with Imogene Coca, Paul Lynde, and Robert Lansing. The film received two Golden Globe Award nominations in 1964: Best Motion Picture – Musical or Comedy and Best Actor – Motion Picture Musical or Comedy for Lemmon.

The film is based on the Broadway play of the same name by Lawrence Roman that first ran in 1960–61, which featured Jones in the same role.

== Plot ==
Hogan is a lecherous landlord and a bachelor who ogles and tries to seduce his female tenants. He is also a master con man. His bachelor pad consists of blood-red walls, African sculptures, a well-stocked cocktail bar, a switch-operated fireplace, and mechanized violins. He walks around wearing a scarlet cardigan (with matching socks and shirts) and carries a devilish smirk. His apartment block that includes tropical plants. He rents rooms only to gorgeous single women at just $75 a month. An older married couple, handyman Murphy and maid Dorcas, work for Hogan.

Irene, a recently divorced tenant, has just ended a relationship with Hogan. She is moving out of the apartment with the assistance of her friend Charles. The apartment is immediately snapped up by her niece, Robin. Hogan is thrilled at the prospect of yet another beautiful tenant to seduce, but is initially unaware that Robin's short-tempered, frustrated, bumbling boyfriend David is moving in with her in a 'platonic' capacity only, to determine their compatibility.

Hogan does his best to prevent David and Robin from consummating their relationship. Irene, who has come to realize the extent of Hogan's promiscuity, is determined to prevent him from getting his hands on her niece. Irene confronts him at his barber, and Hogan is self-defensive and comically self-deluded.

== Cast ==
- Jack Lemmon as Hogan
- Carol Lynley as Robin Austin
- Dean Jones as David Manning
- Edie Adams as Irene Wilson
- Paul Lynde as Murphy
- Robert Lansing as Charles Howard
- Imogene Coca as Dorcas Murphy
- Joy Harmon as Ardice
- Pamela Curran as Dolores
- Asa Maynor as Cheryl
- Laurie Sibbald as Eve
- Jane Wald as Liz (woman in shower)
- Celeste Yarnall as New Girl in Van
- Bill Bixby as Track Team Coach
- Bill Erwin as Teacher
- Matty Jordan as Maitre D'
- James Millhollin as The Thin Man

== Other versions ==
The film was adapted from a Broadway play by Lawrence Roman. The stage production opened on November 16, 1960, at Henry Miller's Theatre and ran for 173 performances. The original cast included Gig Young as Hogan, Sandra Church as Robin, and Dean Jones as David.

An hour-long unsold television pilot titled Under the Yum Yum Tree and directed by E. W. Swackhamer premiered on ABC on September 2, 1969. The manager of the apartment complex was played by Jack Sheldon and among the cast were Ryan O'Neal and Leigh Taylor-Young, who were married from 1967 to 1971. Both were stars of ABC's primetime serial Peyton Place, which had broadcast its final episode three months earlier, on June 2.

== Song ==
The song "Under the Yum Yum Tree", written by Sammy Cahn and Jimmy Van Heusen, is sung by James Darren during the opening credits, and its melody is used thematically throughout the picture.

== Novelization ==
Slightly in advance of the film's release, as was the custom of the era, a paperback novelization of the film was published by Dell Books. The author was renowned crime and western novelist Marvin H. Albert, a prolific author of movie tie-ins, especially light comedies.

== See also ==
- List of American films of 1963
