= James Deuter =

American actor

- Born: March 19, 1939; Chicago, Illinois, U.S.
- Died: August 29, 2010 (aged 71); Chicago, Illinois, U.S.
- Occupation: Actor
- Years active: 1983–1999

James Deuter (March 19, 1939 – August 29, 2010) was an American actor who appeared on film and television. He is most known for playing Boswell on Early Edition.

He died on August 29, 2010, of congestive heart failure and circulatory disease.

== Filmography ==
Year	Title	Role	Notes
1983	American Playhouse	Mr. Whitley	Episode: Under the Biltmore Clock
1983	Vital Signs	Golfer #2	TV movie
1983	Charley Hannah	The Pop	TV movie
1987	Weeds	Motel Manager	
1988	A Night in the Life of Jimmy Reardon	Mr. Spaulding	
1989	Major League	Phil Butler	
1991	Only the Lonely	Waiter	
1992	The Babe	Society Man	
1992	Mo' Money	Mr. Shift	
1994	Missing Persons	Lyle Lewis	Episode: I've Got a Siren!
1994	The Hudsucker Proxy	New Year’s Mob	
1994	With Honors	Judge	
1994	Ri¢hie Ri¢h	News Reporter	
1996–1997	Early Edition	Boswell	9 Episodes
1998	Cupid	Dean Wetland	Episode: The Linguist
1999	Payback	Tailor	(final film role)
