= Leigh French =

American actress

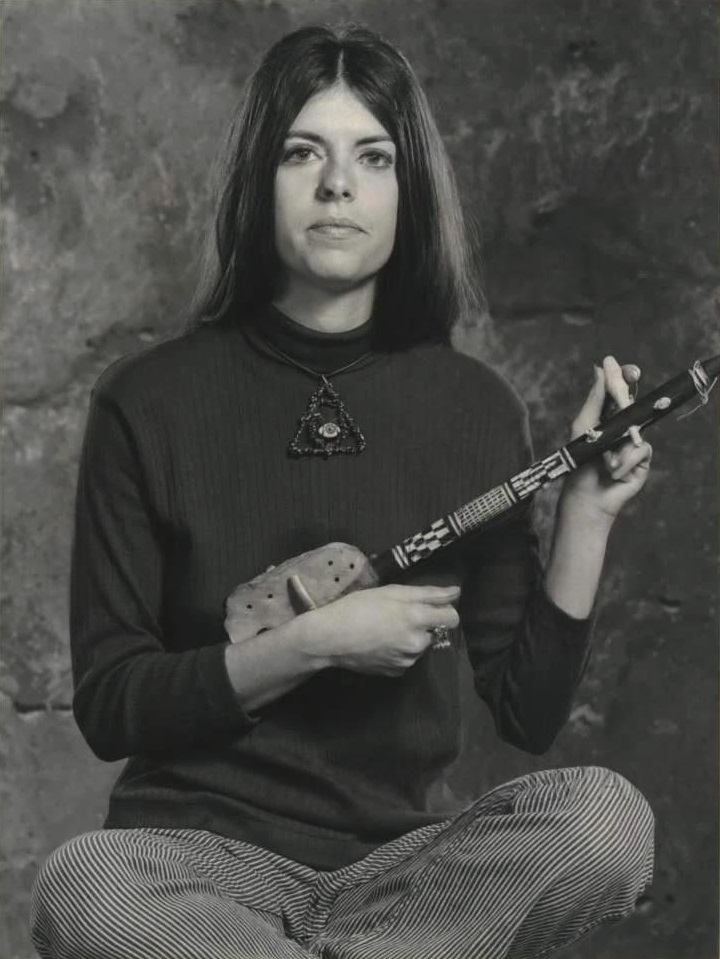
- French in 1977
- Born: July 14, 1945 (age 80); Ashland, Kentucky, U.S.
- Occupation: Actress
- Years active: 1966–2014

Leigh French (born July 14, 1945) is an American actress.

== Early life ==
French was born in Ashland, Kentucky.

== Career ==
In her early career as a regular on The Smothers Brothers Comedy Hour of the late-1960s, French portrayed a hippie named Goldie O'Keefe. The character was originally introduced, in an ostensible studio-audience interview segment, as Goldie Keif; both "Goldie" and "Keif" were slang terms for marijuana at the time. Reportedly, the slight name change to O'Keefe when she became a semi-regular was at the television network's insistence. Her segment of the show was called "Share a Little Tea with Goldie". At the time, "sharing tea" was a popular euphemism for getting high on marijuana. Following suit, her segment consisted largely of "helpful" household advice loaded with sex- and drug-related double entendres.

French played a similar character, a San Francisco hippie type named Cobalt-Blue, in a 1968 episode ("Tag, You're It") of the I Spy series. She and Rob Reiner (both of whom had been members of The Committee improv group in San Francisco) also played hippies in the 1969 "Flower Power" episode of Gomer Pyle, U.S.M.C. French can also be seen in the films WUSA (1970), The Drowning Pool (1975), Aloha, Bobby and Rose (1975), The Hollywood Knights (1980), and The Long Days of Summer (1980). She appeared as Goober Pyle's (George Lindsey) sister on a pilot episode for a sitcom called Goober & the Truckers' Paradise. The show, in which Goober and his sister managed a highway truck stop, was not picked up by networks.

French's acting work continued steadily through 2010, with her primarily performing behind the scenes and in voiceover roles in animated features up to 2014.

== Filmography ==
=== Film ===
Year	Title	Role	Notes
1968	How Sweet It Is!	Maria	
1970	WUSA	Girl	
1970	Norwood	Vernell Bird	
1973	The All-American Boy	Lovette	
1973	The Laughing Policeman	Porno Cashier	
1975	Aloha, Bobby and Rose	Donna Sue	
1975	The Drowning Pool	Red Head	
1975	White Line Fever	Lucy	
1977	The Great Smokey Roadblock	Glinda	
1980	The Hollywood Knights	Jacqueline Freedman	
1981	History of the World, Part I	Prehistoric Woman	
1981	Halloween II	Gary's Mother	
1985	Summer Rental	Announcer	
1985	Stoogemania	Television voice	
1986	Children of a Lesser God	Announcer	
1987	Summer School	Student	
1988	Bright Lights, Big City	Additional voices	
1988	Talk Radio	Newscaster	
1989	Uncle Buck	Additional voices	
1990	The Spirit of '76	Voice of the Future	
1991	Career Opportunities	Voiceover	
1991	An American Tail: Fievel Goes West	Various voices	Uncredited
1992	Glengarry Glen Ross	Additional voice	
1995	A Goofy Movie	Additional voice	Uncredited
1996	Ghosts of Mississippi	Bridge Lady	
1998	Homegrown	Waitress	
2004	The Big Bounce	Rell	
2005	Rumor Has It	Charity Dinner Guest	
2006	Barnyard	Additional voices	
2007	Shrek the Third	Baby Ogres	Uncredited

=== Television ===
Year	Title	Role	Notes
1966	The John Bartholomew Tucker Show	Various roles	Episode #1.7
1966–1967	Hey, Landlord	Various roles	3 episodes
1968	I Spy	Cobalt-Blue	Episode: "Tag, You're It"
1969	Gomer Pyle, U.S.M.C.	Michele	Episode: "Flower Power"
1973	Chase	Rita	Episode: "A Bit of Class"
1975	Delancey Street: The Crisis Within	Mary	Television film
1975	The Fireman's Ball	Angelina	Television film
1976	How to Break Up a Happy Divorce	Marilyn	Television film
1978	Goober & the Truckers' Paradise	Pearl Pyle	Television film
1980	The Long Days of Summer	Frances Haley	Television film
1981	CHiPs	Jackie	Episode: "Crash Course"
1984	St. Elsewhere	Alisha	Episode: "Attack"
1984	It's Your Move	Miss Feldman	Episode: "Put to the Test"
1984	E/R	Mrs. Forman	Episode: "Only a Nurse"
1985	This Child Is Mine	Carol	Television film
1985	Knots Landing	Phyllis Elliot	Episode: "Rise and Fall"
1987	Warm Hearts, Cold Feet	Nancy Carmel	Television film
1990	Midnight Caller	Sunny / Sunny Farina	2 episodes
1994	Reform School Girl	Velmont Announcer	Television film
1994	Rebel Highway	Velmont Announcer	Episode: "Reform School Girl"
1995	Original Sins	The Voice	Television film
2009	Children of the Corn	Additional voice	Television film
