= Louanne Sirota =

American actress and singer

- Other name: Louanne
- Years active: 1978–present

Louanne Sirota, also known as simply Louanne, is an American actress and singer. She played the title role in Annie in the 2nd National Company in Los Angeles in 1979. At the time, she was the youngest ever picked for the role. She acted as a wise-beyond-her-years Iowa teenager in the short-lived comedy-drama Two Marriages on ABC. She was seen as herself in the 2006 documentary Life After Tomorrow, about the women who have played orphans in Annie.

== Filmography ==
=== As Louanne ===
- Chuck Barris Rah Rah Show (TV) (1978) as Louanne
- The Long Days of Summer (1980) (TV) as Sarah
- Oh, God! Book II (1980) (Film) as Tracy Richards
- The Last Song (1980) (TV) as Abby Newman
- Aloha Paradise (1 episode, 1981)
- Mork & Mindy (1 episode, 1981) as Miss Geezba
- The Love Boat (1 episode, 1982) as Lybie Warner
- Seven Brides for Seven Brothers (1 episode, 1983) as Jenny Barrett
- Missing Pieces (1983) (TV) as Valerie Scott
- Two Marriages (2 seasons, 1983–1984) as Shelby Armstrong
- Anything For A Laugh (TV) (Chuck Barris Show) (1986) as Louanne
- True Confessions (1 episode, 1986)
- The Bronx Zoo (1 episode, 1987) as Sandy Gillian
- Cowboy Joe 1987 as Isabelle Tidmunk
- A Night in the Life of Jimmy Reardon (1988) (film) as Suzie Middleburg

=== As Louanne Sirota ===
- McBride: It's Murder, Madam (2005) (TV) as Forensics Officer
- Detective (2005) (TV) as Judith Pallacio
- McBride: Requiem (2006) (TV) as Forensics Officer
- Accidentally in Love (2011) (TV) as Mama Crowne
