= A Night in the Life of Jimmy Reardon =

1988 film by William Richert

- Theatrical release poster
- Directed by: William Richert
- Screenplay by: William Richert
- Based on: Aren't You Even Gonna Kiss Me Goodbye? by William Richert
- Produced by: Russell Schwartz
- Starring: River Phoenix; Ann Magnuson; Meredith Salenger; Ione Skye; Louanne; Matthew Perry; Paul Koslo
- Cinematography: John J. Connor
- Edited by: Suzanne Fenn
- Music by: Bill Conti (US version); Elmer Bernstein (Non-US version)
- Production company: Island Pictures
- Distributed by: 20th Century Fox
- Release date: February 26, 1988
- Running time: 90 minutes
- Country: United States
- Language: English
- Budget: $4 million
- Box office: $6,264,058

A Night in the Life of Jimmy Reardon, also known as Aren't You Even Gonna Kiss Me Goodbye?, is a 1988 American coming-of-age drama film written and directed by William Richert and starring River Phoenix, Ann Magnuson, Meredith Salenger, Matthew Perry (in his film debut), Ione Skye, and Louanne. It is based upon Richert's 1966 novel Aren't You Even Gonna Kiss Me Goodbye?. The story centers on a high school graduate who must decide if he wants to go to business school at the request of his father, or go his own way and find a full-time job, while also deciding on who he wants to be in life and if he should leave his house.

A Night in the Life of Jimmy Reardon was filmed in late 1986 and released in early 1988. The released film deviates considerably from the original director's cut, which is now available under the title Aren't You Even Gonna Kiss Me Goodbye?.

== Plot summary ==
In a wealthy Chicago suburb during the early 1960s, middle-class Jimmy Reardon hangs out with his upper-class best friend, Fred Roberts, and sleeps with Fred's snobby girlfriend, Denise Hunter. He spends his time writing poetry and drinking coffee while he decides what to do after high school. His parents won't help him pay for tuition unless he attends the same business college as his father did, but Jimmy doesn't want to follow that path. Instead, he focuses on coming up with enough money for a plane ticket to go to Hawaii with his wealthy yet chaste girlfriend, Lisa Bentwright. On the night of a big party, Jimmy is given the task of driving home his mother's divorced friend and things spiral out of control from there. Soon, Jimmy finds himself on the verge of losing Lisa, being thrown out of the house, and facing a final confrontation with his father which neither saw coming in a million years.

== Cast ==
- River Phoenix as Jimmy Reardon
- Ann Magnuson as Joyce Fickett
- Meredith Salenger as Lisa Bentwright
- Ione Skye as Denise Hunter
- Louanne Sirota as Suzie Middleberg
- Matthew Perry as Fred Roberts
- Paul Koslo as Al Reardon
- Jane Hallaren as Faye Reardon
- Jason Court as Mathew Hollander
- James Deuter as Mr. Spaulding
- Marji Banks as Emma Spaulding
- Margaret Moore as Mrs. Bentwright
- Anastasia Fielding as Elaine
- Kamie Harper as Rosie Reardon
- Johnny Galecki as Toby Reardon
- Alan Goldsher as Musician #2

== Release ==
On August 19, 1987, 20th Century Fox had acquired domestic theatrical distribution rights of the film from production company Island Pictures, with plans for a broad release early next year, and the possibility of other titles following in the future, which was originally granted to Island an August 28, 1987 date, but the screenings were cancelled, and the film caught the attention of Fox executives, whose production company Island Pictures already had done a video agreement with CBS/Fox Video to handle home video domestic distribution rights to its titles.

== Reception ==
The film barely broke even at the box office, grossing a little over $6.2 million against a $4 million budget.

On Rotten Tomatoes the film has a 38% rating based on 8 reviews. Time Out magazine wrote: "While the film has the charm of rose-tinted retrospect and is often very funny, the pacing is wrong (it seems much longer than it is) and the sex scenes fail to convince." TV Guide stated that the film has been "Unjustly ignored by the vast majority of the critics and public".
