= Moosie Drier =

American television and film actor

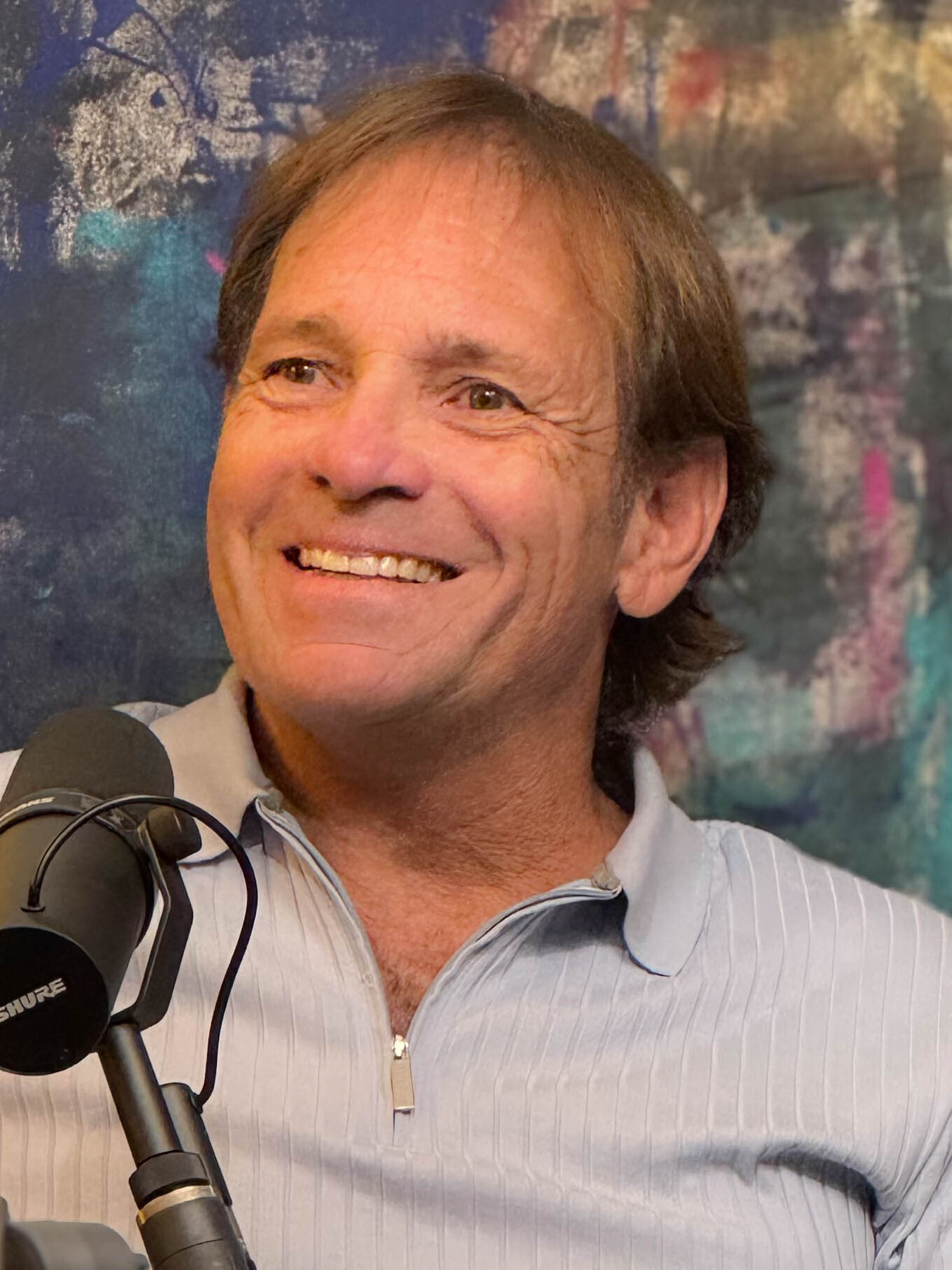
- Drier in 2025
- Born: August 6, 1964 (age 61); Chicago, Illinois, U.S.
- Occupation: Actor
- Years active: 1971–present
- Children: 1

Moosie Drier (born August 6, 1964) is an American television and film actor. He is best known for his roles as Adam Landers in Oh, God! and Riley on Kids Incorporated. Drier had regular appearances on Rowan & Martin's Laugh-In and The Bob Newhart Show. He has also worked as a voice actor and as a director.

== Life and career ==
Drier was born in Chicago but raised in California. He was named after former New York Yankee Bill "Moose" Skowron, who was a friend of Drier's father. He attended U.S. Grant High School, Van Nuys, California.

Drier began his television career as a recurring performer on Rowan & Martin's Laugh-In from the middle of season three until the final season in 1973, hosting a "Kid News for Kids" segment. His first dramatic role was as a deaf boy in two 1972 episodes of Lassie. During this period, Drier had movie roles in the 1972 Jack Lemmon comedy, The War Between Men and Women, the 1972 Barbra Streisand comedy Up the Sandbox, and the made-for-TV comedies Roll, Freddy, Roll! (1974) and All Together Now (1975). In 1977 he was cast in Oh, God! starring John Denver and George Burns. He followed this with a prominent role in the Alan Freed screen biography American Hot Wax (1978), in which the adolescent Drier recounts his reaction to Buddy Holly's death in a broken voice.

At age 10, Drier began voice-acting as a regular character on ABC’s 1974 These Are the Days. Other recurring television roles included Howie Borden, the son of series regular Howard (Bill Daily) on The Bob Newhart Show, and on CBS’s short-lived series Executive Suite as B.J. Koslo. He made appearances on The Waltons (1973), Adam-12 (1973), Apple's Way (1974), Police Story (3 episodes, 1974–75), Emergency! (2 episodes; 1975), Doc (1975), and Little House on the Prairie (1976), CHiPs (1980), Family Ties (1983), Kids Incorporated (1984), Diff'rent Strokes (1986), The A-Team (1986), Highway to Heaven (1986), Blacke's Magic (1986), Cagney & Lacey (1986), Hunter (1986), Just the Ten of Us (1988), The Munsters Today (1990), and Jack & Jill (2000).

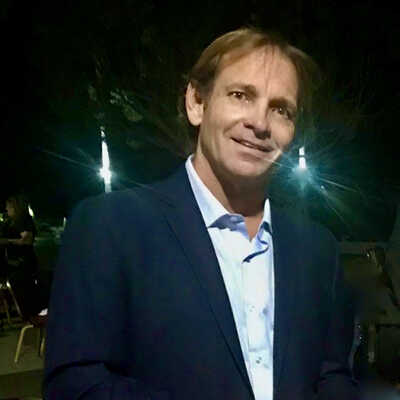
Drier attending television academy event honoring Lily Tomlin

During his early acting career, Drier also appeared in three ABC Afterschool Specials, in one of which, Hewitt's Just Different, Drier had a lead role as Willie Arthur, the friend of the developmentally disabled title character. His late 1970s and early 1980s roles included When Every Day Was the Fourth of July (1978) and Peter Benchley's thriller Hunters of the Reef (1978). Other teen roles consist primarily of biographical dramas; most notably, Drier played a young Mickey Rooney in the 1978 Judy Garland biography Rainbow. The year 1978 also saw the filming of the made-for TV Jack Albertson vehicle Charlie and the Great Balloon Chase, which was not released until three years later. In the 1980s made-for-TV movie Homeward Bound, he played a terminally ill young man, Bobby Seaton, who spends a last summer vacation repairing his relationship with his father, Jake, played by David Soul.

During the late 1990s, Drier accepted minor roles in the sci-fi space-ship hijack thriller Velocity Trap (1997) and Storm (1999), a thriller about a secret military weather control machine gone awry. Since 2000, he has specialized in voice-over work in such films as Teaching Mrs. Tingle (1999), American Beauty (1999), What Lies Beneath (2000) Shrek (2001), 40 Days and 40 Nights (2002), The Shape of Things (2003), Jungle Book 2 (2003), the Lion King 1½ (2004), The Chronicles of Riddick (2004), Hauru no ugoku shiro (Eng: Howl's Moving Castle) in 2004, and Madagascar (2005).

Drier directed episodes of such series as Reba (2005) and Too Late with Adam Carolla (2005). He directed a well-received children's musical, Precious Piglet and Her Pals at the Whitefire Theatre in Sherman Oaks as well as the critically acclaimed Love Like Blue in 2007, also at the Whitefire Theatre.

== Selected filmography ==
=== Television ===
- 1968 : Rowan & Martin's Laugh-In: Regular Performer (1971–1973)
- 1972 : Lassie: Tommy
- 1972 : Here Comes the Judge: First child
- 1972 : The Bob Newhart Show: recurring character: Howie Borden (1972–1977)
- 1973 : The Waltons: Georgie
- 1973 : Adam-12: Dennis Wingard
- 1974 : Apple's Way: Craig Carlson
- 1974 : Runaways (special): Freddie Britton
- 1974 : These Are the Days (voice)
- 1974 : Roll, Freddy, Roll!: Tommy Danton
- 1975 : Police Story: Mike Brenner, Kevin Prescott
- 1975 : All Together Now: Rafe
- 1975 : Doc: Michael
- 1975 : Emergency!: Rick Jenkins
- 1976 : Little House on the Prairie: Junior Barrett
- 1976 : Executive Suite: B.J. Koslo (a recurring character)
- 1977 : Hewitt's Just Different (special): Willie Arthur
- 1977 : It Happened at Lakewood Manor): Tommy West
- 1978 : When Every Day Was the Fourth of July (special): Howie Martin
- 1978 : Rainbow: Mickey Rooney
- 1980 : Homeward Bound (TV movie)
- 1980 : CHiPs: Wayne
- 1981 : Charlie and the Great Balloon Chase (TV movie): Morris O'Neill (produced 1978)
- 1983 : Andrea's Story: A Hitchhiking Tragedy (special): David
- 1983 : Family Ties: Arnie
- 1984 : Kids Incorporated: Riley (1984–1988)
- 1986 : Diff'rent Strokes: John
- 1986 : The A-Team: Bobby Sherman
- 1986 : Highway to Heaven: Tim Charles Jr
- 1986 : Blacke's Magic: Dale
- 1986 : Cagney & Lacey: Gorham
- 1986 : Hunter: Phillip Epperson
- 1988 : Just the Ten of Us: Warren
- 1990 : The Munsters Today: The Gateman's Son
- 2000 : Jack & Jill

=== Filmography (actor) ===
- 1972 : The War Between Men and Women: David Kozlenko
- 1972 : Up the Sandbox: Billy
- 1973 : The Toy Game: Matthew Norris
- 1977 : Oh, God!: Adam Landers
- 1978 : American Hot Wax: Artie Moress, Buddy Holly Fanclub President
- 1980 : The Hollywood Knights: Moosie
- 1989 : The 'burbs: voice
- 1997 : Velocity Trap: E.D. Officer
- 1999 : Storm: Radar Tech
- 2018 : Charming: Additional voices

=== Filmography (director) ===
- 1988 : Kids Incorporated (TV): Kahuna Kids
- 2005 : Reba (TV)
- 2005 : Too Late with Adam Carolla (TV)
- 2009 : The Peacemaker (TV pilot)

=== Theater (director/producer) ===
- 2005: Precious Piglet and Her Pals
- 2007: Love Like Blue
- 2012: Cat on a Hot Tin Roof
- 2013: God of Carnage
- 2014: Hollywood Shorts, Lend Me a Tenor, Littlest Angel
- 2015: Hollywood Shorts, Dead Pilots Society, Hound of the Baskervilles

== Bibliography ==
- Holmstrom, John. The Moving Picture Boy: An International Encyclopaedia from 1895 to 1995. Norwich, Michael Russell, 1996, p. 349-350.
