= Seaman Jacobs =

American screenwriter

- Born: Seaman Block Jacobs; February 25, 1912; Kingston, New York, U.S.
- Died: April 8, 2008 (aged 96); Los Angeles, California, U.S.
- Other name: Seamen Jacobs
- Occupation: Television screenwriter
- Years active: 1949–1991

Seaman Block Jacobs (February 25, 1912 – April 8, 2008) was an American screenwriter. He wrote episodes for several TV shows, such as The Addams Family, The Lucy Show, I Dream of Jeannie, F-Troop, The Andy Griffith Show, Here's Lucy and Diff'rent Strokes. He was nominated for an Emmy Award in 1978 for Outstanding Writing in a Comedy-Variety or Music Special for The George Burns One-Man Show in 1977. He co-wrote for I Love Lucy and The Love Boat with Freddie Fox (screenwriter).

On April 8, 2008, Jacobs died of cardiac arrest at the age of 96.

== Selected filmography ==
Film
| Year | Film | Notes |
|---|---|---|
| 1963 | It Happened at the World's Fair | Written by |
| 1980 | Oh, God! Book II | Writer |
Television
| Year | Title | Notes |
| 1949–1950 | The Ed Wynn Show | 7 episodes |
| 1957–1959 | How to Marry a Millionaire | 7 episodes |
| 1959–1962 | Bachelor Father | 28 episodes |
| 1960 | The Dennis O'Keefe Show | 1 episode |
| 1963–1964 | Petticoat Junction | 6 episodes |
| 1964–1965 | The Addams Family | Pilot episode |
| 1965–1966 | F Troop | 8 episodes |
| 1967–1968 | The Mothers-in-Law | 5 episodes |
| 1967–1970 | Family Affair | 4 episodes |
| 1968–1970 | The Red Skelton Show | 41 episodes |
| 1971 | The Jimmy Stewart Show | Unknown episodes |
| 1972 | Temperatures Rising | 2 episodes |
| 1973 | Wait Till Your Father Gets Home | 1 episode |
| 1973–1975 | Sigmund and the Sea Monsters | 1 episode |
| 1975–1976 | Maude | 2 episodes |
| 1976 | The Dumplings | 1 episode |
| 1976–1977 | Wonderbug | 3 episodes |
| 1976–1981 | The Jeffersons | 5 episodes |
| 1983 | Bob Hope's All-Star Super Bowl Party | Television special |
| 1986 | All-Star Tribute to General Jimmy Doolittle | Television special |
| 1987 | NBC Investigates Bob Hope | Television special |
| 1991 | Bob Hope & Friends: Making New Memories | Television special |
