= Oh, God! Book II =

1980 film by Gilbert Cates

- Theatrical release poster
- Directed by: Gilbert Cates
- Screenplay by: Josh Greenfeld; Hal Goldman; Fred S. Fox; Seaman Jacobs; Melissa Miller
- Produced by: Gilbert Cates
- Starring: George Burns; Suzanne Pleshette; David Birney; Louanne Sirota
- Cinematography: Ralph Woolsey
- Edited by: Peter E. Berger
- Music by: Charles Fox
- Distributed by: Warner Bros. Pictures
- Release date: October 3, 1980
- Running time: 94 minutes
- Country: United States
- Language: English
- Box office: $14 million

Oh, God! Book II is a 1980 American comedy film, directed by Gilbert Cates from a script co-written by Josh Greenfeld, Hal Goldman, Fred S. Fox, Seaman Jacobs, and Melissa Miller. The movie is a sequel to Oh, God! (1977) (though the only character returning was George Burns' God character), and was the second of three installments in the Oh, God! film series. Starring George Burns, Louanne Sirota, Suzanne Pleshette, and David Birney, the film also featured cameo appearances by Joyce Brothers and Hugh Downs.

== Synopsis ==
In the second film in the Oh, God! series, God (George Burns) asks the help of 11-year-old Tracy Richards (Louanne Sirota) to help Him promote Himself; He feels that people have forgotten about Him. Tracy and her best friend, Shingo (John Louie), create the slogan "Think God"; they soon have everyone spreading the slogan by posters, graffiti, and a multitude of other ways. Tracy's divorcing parents (played by Suzanne Pleshette and David Birney) find out over a Chinese dinner, and are concerned, whereupon they take their daughter Tracy to a psychiatric center for a battery of tests, worried that their young girl might be mentally or neurologically ill. God is the only one that can straighten out the situation.

== Main cast ==
- George Burns as God
- Suzanne Pleshette as Paula Richards
- David Birney as Don Richards
- Louanne Sirota as Tracy Richards (billed as Louanne)
- John Louie as Shingo
- Wilfrid Hyde-White as Judge Thomas Miller
- Conrad Janis as Charles Benson, School Principal
- Hans Conried as Dr Barnes

== Reception ==
As of 2021, this film has a 43% rating on Rotten Tomatoes, based on seven reviews with an average rating of 5.1/10.
