= God, Sex & Apple Pie =

- Directed by: Paul Leaf
- Written by: Jerome Courshon
- Produced by: Jerome Courshon
- Starring: Greg Wrangler, Penelope Crabtree, Mark Porro, Katy Kurtzman, Jerome Courshon, Andrea Leithe, Steve Rifkin, Maria McCann, Phil Palisoul
- Cinematography: Scott E. Steele
- Edited by: Karen Rasch
- Music by: John Boegehold
- Distributed by: Warner Bros.
- Release date: April 1998 (Arizona International Film Festival)
- Running time: 97 Minutes
- Country: United States
- Language: English

God, Sex & Apple Pie is a 1998 film directed by Paul Leaf.
