= Avery Corman =

American writer (born 1935)

- Born: November 28, 1935 (age 90); New York City, U.S.
- Education: DeWitt Clinton High School; New York University
- Occupation: Novelist
- Spouse: Judy Lishinsky (died 2004)
- Children: 2

Avery Corman (born November 28, 1935) is an American novelist. He is known for the books Oh, God! (1971) and Kramer Versus Kramer (1977), each adapted into a successful film.

== Early life, family and education ==
Corman was born in the Bronx, New York. He is a graduate of the New York City public schools; he attended P.S. 33 and DeWitt Clinton High School in the Bronx. He graduated from New York University in 1956.

== Career ==
After graduating college, Corman worked in magazine publishing, then became a freelance writer of educational films and humor articles. He then began writing novels.

Corman is the author of the novels Oh, God! (1971), the basis for the 1977 film; The Bust-Out King (1977); Kramer Versus Kramer (1977), adapted into the Academy Award-winning 1979 film; The Old Neighborhood (1980); 50 (1987); Prized Possessions (1991); The Big Hype (1992); A Perfect Divorce (2004); and The Boyfriend from Hell (2006). He is the author of a memoir, My Old Neighborhood Remembered (2014). He also wrote the text for Bark in the Park! Poems for Dog Lovers (2019), a children's picture book.

Critic Stefan Kanfer wrote in Time of Corman's novel 50: "Avery Corman has a literary gift for dialogue and predicament. Sealed in a time capsule, 50 could tell future generations more about contemporary middle-aged mores than a library of sociological theses." The combination of the novel Kramer Versus Kramer and the film changed the attitude of the public and the courts about divorce and custody in the US and internationally. Greg Ferrara, on Turner Classic Movies' web site, wrote: "His story would explode accepted views on custody and parenting...Kramer vs. Kramer didn't just set box office records for family drama, it changed the very way people thought about divorce, family and child custody."

Corman has authored articles and essays in several publications, including The New York Times.

After seeing a 2010 stage adaptation of Kramer vs. Kramer in Paris written by Didier Caron and Stephane Boutet, Corman wrote his own play based on his novel. The stage adaptation of Kramer vs. Kramer by Corman was produced in Greece, Hungary, Italy, and the Netherlands in 2012. There have been subsequent productions in Slovakia, The Czech Republic, China, and Estonia.

== Personal life ==
A gift by Corman to the City of New York of a restored basketball court in his childhood schoolyard became the catalyst for the creation of the City Parks Foundation. Established in 1989, the foundation has become a multimillion-dollar nonprofit organization creating and funding parks programs throughout New York City. Corman has served on its board of directors since the foundation's inception.

He was married for 37 years to Judy Corman (née Lishinsky), who died in 2004. At the time of her death, she was senior vice president, director of corporate communications and media relations at Scholastic, Inc. Judy Corman masterminded the publicity for the launch and subsequent publications of the Harry Potter books in the United States. She was a 2001 winner of a Matrix Award from New York Women in Communications. The Cormans' two children are Matthew, a screenwriter, and Nicholas, who works in business development in Silicon Valley.

== Novels ==
- Oh, God! (1971)
- The Bust-Out King (1977)
- Kramer Versus Kramer (1977)
- The Old Neighborhood (1980)
- 50 (1987)
- Prized Possessions (1992)
- The Big Hype (1992)
- A Perfect Divorce (2004)
- The Boyfriend from Hell (2006)

== Memoir ==
- My Old Neighborhood Remembered (2014)
