= List of American films of 1969 =

More than 182 American films were released in 1969.

== Box office ==
The highest-grossing American films released in 1969, by domestic box office gross revenue as estimated by The Numbers, are as follows:

Highest-grossing films of 1969
Rank	Title	Distributor	Domestic gross
1	Butch Cassidy and the Sundance Kid	20th Century Fox	$102,308,900
2	The Love Bug	Walt Disney	$50,576,808
3	Midnight Cowboy	MGM	$44,785,053
4	Easy Rider	Columbia Pictures	$41,728,598
5	Hello, Dolly	20th Century Fox	$33,208,099
6	Bob & Carol & Ted & Alice	Columbia Pictures	$31,897,253
7	Paint Your Wagon	Paramount	$31,678,778
8	True Grit	Paramount	$31,132,592
9	Cactus Flower	Columbia Pictures	$25,889,208
10	Goodbye, Columbus	Paramount	$22,939,805

== January–March ==
Opening		Title	Production company	Cast and crew	Ref.
J A N U A R Y	15	More Dead Than Alive	United Artists / Aubrey Schenck Productions	Robert Sparr (director); George Schenck (screenplay); Clint Walker, Vincent Price, Anne Francis, Paul Hampton, Mike Henry, William Woodson, Beverly Powers	
J A N U A R Y	15	Riot	Paramount Pictures / William Castle Productions	Buzz Kulik (director); James Poe (screenplay); Jim Brown, Gene Hackman, Mike Kellin, Gerald S. O'Loughlin, Ben Carruthers, Clifford David, Bill Walker, Frank Eyman, Jerry Thompson, Ricky Summers, Mr. Gerri, John Neiderhauser	
J A N U A R Y	23	Some Girls Do	The Rank Organisation / Ashdown Film Productions / Pinewood Studios	Ralph Thomas (director); David D. Osborn, Liz Charles-Williams (screenplay); Richard Johnson, Daliah Lavi, Beba Lončar, James Villiers, Ronnie Stevens, Vanessa Howard, Maurice Denham, Sydne Rome, Virginia North, Robert Morley, Adrienne Posta, Florence Desmond, Nicholas Phipps, Yutte Stensgaard, Richard Hurndall, Doug Sheldon, Joanna Lumley, Maria Aitken, Shakira Caine, Johnny Briggs, John Paul, George Belbin, Marga Roche, Dora Graham, Doris Graham	
J A N U A R Y	27	The Extraordinary Seaman	Metro-Goldwyn-Mayer / John Frankenheimer Productions	John Frankenheimer (director); Phillip Rock, Hal Dresner (screenplay); David Niven, Faye Dunaway, Alan Alda, Mickey Rooney, Jack Carter, Juano Hernandez, Manu Tupou, Barry Kelley, Jerry Fujikawa, Winston Churchill, Charles de Gaulle, Olivia de Havilland, Errol Flynn, Adolf Hitler, Van Johnson, Dorothy Lamour, Vivien Leigh, Douglas MacArthur, Benito Mussolini, Gregory Peck, Franklin D. Roosevelt, Ann Sheridan, Joseph Stalin, Robert Taylor, Hideki Tôjô, Bess Truman	
F E B R U A R Y	5	The Wrecking Crew	Columbia Pictures / Meadway-Claude Productions Company	Phil Karlson (director); William McGivern (screenplay); Dean Martin, Elke Sommer, Sharon Tate, Nancy Kwan, Nigel Green, Tina Louise, John Larch, John Brascia, Weaver Levy, Wilhelm von Homburg, Pepper Martin, Ted Jordan, Lynn Borden, Noel Drayton, Joe Gray, Rex Holman, Joe Lewis, Carey Loftin, Byron Morrow, Chuck Norris, Ed Parker, Bartlett Robinson, Fred Stromsoe, Frank Tallman, Dick Winslow, Bill Saito, Fuji	
F E B R U A R Y	12	The Candy Man	Allied Artists Pictures / Sagittarius Productions	Herbert J. Leder (director/screenplay); George Sanders, Leslie Parrish, Manolo Fábregas, Gina Romand, José Ángel Espinosa 'Ferrusquilla', Pixie Hopkin, Félix Gonzalez, Pedro Galván, Nancy Rodman, Chuck Anderson, Carlos Cortés, John Kelly, Lupita Ferrat	
F E B R U A R Y	19	The Night of the Following Day	Universal Pictures / Gina Productions	Hubert Cornfield (director/screenplay); Robert Phippeny (screenplay); Marlon Brando, Richard Boone, Rita Moreno, Pamela Franklin, Jess Hahn, Jacques Marin, Al Lettieri, Gérald Buhr, Hugues Wanner	
M A R C H	5	The Big Bounce	Warner Bros.-Seven Arts / Greenway Productions	Alex March (director); Robert Dozier (screenplay); Ryan O'Neal, Leigh Taylor-Young, Van Heflin, Lee Grant, James Daly, Robert Webber, Cindy Eilbacher, Noam Pitlik, Charles Cooper, Paul Sorensen, Phyllis Davis	
M A R C H	11	2000 Years Later	Warner Bros.-Seven Arts	Bert Tenzer (director/screenplay); Terry-Thomas, Edward Everett Horton, Pat Harrington Jr., Lisa Seagram, John Abbott, John Myhers, Murray Roman, Casey Kasem, Rudi Gernreich, Tom Melody, Myrna Ross, Monti Rock III, Michael Christian, Bert Tenzer	
M A R C H	12	Where Eagles Dare	Metro-Goldwyn-Mayer / Winkast Film Productions	Brian G. Hutton (director); Alistair MacLean (screenplay); Richard Burton, Clint Eastwood, Mary Ure, Patrick Wymark, Michael Hordern, Donald Houston, Peter Barkworth, William Squire, Robert Beatty, Brook Williams, Neil McCarthy, Vincent Ball, Anton Diffring, Ferdy Mayne, Derren Nesbitt, Victor Beaumont, Ingrid Pitt, Richard Beale, Ivor Dean, Guy Deghy, Harry Fielder, Nigel Lambert, Olga Lowe, Ian McCulloch, Derek Newark, Anton Rodgers, Philip Stone, Fred Wood	
M A R C H	13	Charro!	National General Pictures	Charles Marquis Warren (director/screenplay); Elvis Presley, Ina Balin, Victor French, Barbara Werle, Solomon Sturges, Lynn Kellogg, James Sikking, Paul Brinegar, Harry Landers, Tony Young, James Almanzar, Charles H. Gray, John Pickard, Garry Walberg, Duane Grey, Rodd Redwing, J. Edward McKinley, Robert Luster, Robert Karnes, Christa Lang	
M A R C H	13	The Love Bug	Walt Disney Productions	Robert Stevenson (director); Bill Walsh, Don DaGradi (screenplay); Dean Jones, Michele Lee, David Tomlinson, Buddy Hackett, Joe Flynn, Benson Fong, Joe E. Ross, Barry Kelley, Iris Adrian, Gary Owens, Chick Hearn, Andy Granatelli, Ned Glass, Robert Foulk, Gil Lamb, Nicole Jaffe, Wally Boag, Peter Renaday, Pedro Gonzalez Gonzalez, Dale Van Sickel, Fred Stromsoe, Russ Caldwell, Brian Fong	
M A R C H	26	100 Rifles	20th Century Fox / Marvin Schwartz Productions	Tom Gries (director/screenplay); Clair Huffaker (screenplay); Jim Brown, Raquel Welch, Burt Reynolds, Fernando Lamas, Dan O'Herlihy, Eric Braeden, Michael Forest, Aldo Sambrell, Soledad Miranda, José Manuel Martín, Sancho Gracia, Lorenzo Lamas, Alberto Dalbés, Charly Bravo	
M A R C H	27	Support Your Local Sheriff!	United Artists	Burt Kennedy (director); William Bowers (screenplay); James Garner, Joan Hackett, Walter Brennan, Harry Morgan, Jack Elam, Henry Jones, Bruce Dern, Willis Bouchey, Kathleen Freeman, Walter Burke, Chubby Johnson, Gene Evans, Dick Peabody, Dick Haynes, Paul Sorensen	

== April–June ==
Opening		Title	Production company	Cast and crew	Ref.
A P R I L	1	Model Shop	Columbia Pictures	Jacques Demy (director/screenplay); Anouk Aimée, Gary Lockwood, Alexandra Hay, Carol Cole, Tom Fielding, Severn Darden, Anne Randall, Hilarie Thompson, Fred Willard, Neil Elliot, Jacqueline Miller, Duke Hobbie, Craig Littler, Jon Lawson, Jeanne Sorel, Jon Hill	
A P R I L	1	Sam Whiskey	United Artists / Brighton Pictures / Levy-Gardner-Leven	Arnold Laven (director); William W. Norton (screenplay); Burt Reynolds, Clint Walker, Ossie Davis, Angie Dickinson, William Schallert, Woodrow Parfrey, Del Reeves, Anthony James, William Boyett, Chubby Johnson, Sidney Clute, Tracey Roberts, John Quijada, Tom Steele, Rick Davis, John Damler, Bob Adler, Ayllene Gibbons, Amanda Harley	
A P R I L	1	Sweet Charity	Universal Pictures	Bob Fosse (director); Peter Stone (screenplay); Shirley MacLaine, John McMartin, Chita Rivera, Paula Kelly, Stubby Kaye, Barbara Bouchet, Ricardo Montalbán, Sammy Davis Jr., Suzanne Charny, Alan Hewitt, Dante DiPaolo, Ben Vereen, Lee Roy Reams, John Wheeler, Toni Basil, Henry Beckman, Chelsea Brown, Lonnie Burr, Jeff Burton, Noble "Kid" Chissell, Bud Cort, Linda Clifford, Alfred Dennis, George DeNormand, Kathryn Doby, Tom Hatten, Buddy Joe Hooker, Nolan Leary, Lance LeGault, Buddy Lewis, Judith Lowry, Joseph Mell, Maudie Prickett, Georgina Spelvin, Kristoffer Tabori, Roger Til, Lorene Yarnell	
A P R I L	2	Angel in My Pocket	Universal Pictures	Alan Rafkin (director); James Fritzell, Everett Greenbaum (screenplay); Andy Griffith, Lee Meriwether, Jerry Van Dyke, Kay Medford, Henry Jones, Edgar Buchanan, Gary Collins, Parker Fennelly, Jack Dodson, Elena Verdugo, Herbie Faye, Margaret Hamilton, Ruth McDevitt, Bob Hastings, Jim Boles, Leonard Stone, Steve Franken, Larry D. Mann, Al Checco, Maggie Peterson, Peggy Mondo, Joy Harmon, Benny Rubin, George Tapps, Eddie Quillan, Buddy Foster, Todd Starke, Claudia Bryar, Ellen Corby, Rufe Davis, Jesslyn Fax, Mary Gregory, Kathryn Minner, Stuart Nisbet, Susan Seaforth Hayes, Duke Fishman, Ray Kellogg, Jack Perkins, Joe Ploski, Johnny Silver, Herb Vigran	
A P R I L	3	Goodbye, Columbus	Paramount Pictures / Willow Tree	Larry Peerce (director); Arnold Schulman (screenplay); Richard Benjamin, Jack Klugman, Nan Martin, Ali MacGraw, Royce Wallace, Mari Gorman, Jan Peerce, Johnny Carson, Susan Lucci, Bette Midler, Michael Nouri, Jaclyn Smith, Michael Meyers, Lori Shelle, Monroe Arnold, Kay Cummings, Sylvie Strause	
A P R I L	9	The Wedding Party	Troma Entertainment / Ondine Productions	Brian De Palma, Wilford Leach, Cynthia Munroe (directors/screenplay); Robert De Niro, Jill Clayburgh, William Finley, Jennifer Salt, Andra Akers, Tony Converse, Jared Martin, Velda Setterfield, Raymond McNally, John Braswell, Charles Pfluger	
A P R I L	16	Hook, Line & Sinker	Columbia Pictures / Jerry Lewis Productions	George Marshall (director); Rod Amateau (screenplay); Jerry Lewis, Peter Lawford, Anne Francis, Pedro Gonzalez Gonzalez, Jimmy Miller, Jennifer Edwards, Eleanor Audley, Henry Corden, Sylvia Lewis, Phillip Pine, Felipe Turich, Kathleen Freeman, Murray Alper, Larry J. Blake, Scatman Crothers, Frankie Darro, George DeNormand, Byron Foulger, Stella Garcia, George Holmes, Hubert H. Humphrey, Norman Leavitt, Del Moore, William O'Connell, Barbara Pepper, Davis Roberts, Andy Romano, Benny Rubin, Harlan Warde, Kenneth Washington, William Wellman Jr.	
A P R I L	17	Salesman	Maysles Films	Albert Maysles, David Maysles (directors/screenplay); Paul Brennan, Charles McDevitt, James Baker, Raymond Martos, Kennie Turner, Melbourne I. Feltman, Margaret McCarron	
A P R I L	24	If It's Tuesday, This Must Be Belgium	United Artists / Wolper Pictures Ltd.	Mel Stuart (director); David Shaw (screenplay); Suzanne Pleshette, Ian McShane, Mildred Natwick, Murray Hamilton, Michael Constantine, Norman Fell, Sandy Baron, Peggy Cass, Marty Ingels, Pamela Britton, Reva Rose, Aubrey Morris, Hilarie Thompson, Luke Halpin, Mario Carotenuto, Patricia Routledge, Marina Berti, Paul Esser, Jenny White, Senta Berger, John Cassavetes, Joan Collins, Vittorio De Sica, Donovan, Anita Ekberg, Ben Gazzara, Virna Lisi, Elsa Martinelli, Catherine Spaak, Robert Vaughn, Paul Esser, Carol Cleveland, Frank Latimore, Jeremy Lloyd, Yutte Stensgaard	
A P R I L	30	The Big Cube	Warner Bros.-Seven Arts	Tito Davison (director); William Douglas Lansford (screenplay); Lana Turner, George Chakiris, Richard Egan, Daniel O'Herlihy, Augusto Benedico, Victor Junco, Norma Herrera, Regina Torné, Carlos Agostí, José Roberto Hill, Alma Muriel, Carlos Riquelme, Karin Mossberg, Pamela Rodgers, Carlos East, Pedro Galván	
M A Y	1	The Mad Room	Columbia Pictures	Bernard Girard (director); Garrett Fort, Reginald Denham (screenplay); Shelley Winters, Stella Stevens, Carole Cole, Severn Darden, Beverly Garland, Michael Burns, Lloyd Haynes, Jennifer Bishop, Gloria Manon, Emil Sitka, Kam Tong, Skip Ward, Lou Kane	
M A Y	6	Slaves	Continental Distributing	Herbert J. Biberman (director/screenplay); John O. Killens, Alida Sherman (screenplay); Stephen Boyd, Dionne Warwick, Ossie Davis, Nancy Coleman, Julius Harris, David Huddleston, Eva Jessye, Robert Kya-Hill, Gale Sondergaard, Shepperd Strudwick, Barbara Ann Teer, Marilyn Clark, James Heath, Oscar Paul Jones, Aldine King	
M A Y	7	Sinful Davey	United Artists / The Mirisch Corporation	John Huston (director); James R. Webb (screenplay); John Hurt, Pamela Franklin, Nigel Davenport, Ronald Fraser, Robert Morley, Fidelma Murphy, Maxine Audley, Fionnula Flanagan, Donal McCann, Allan Cuthbertson, Eddie Byrne, Niall MacGinnis, Noel Purcell, Judith Furse, Francis de Wolff, Paul Farrell, Brenda Fricker, Anjelica Huston	
M A Y	10	Mackenna's Gold	Columbia Pictures / Highroad Productions, Inc.	J. Lee Thompson (director); Carl Foreman (screenplay); Gregory Peck, Omar Sharif, Telly Savalas, Camilla Sparv, Keenan Wynn, Julie Newmar, Ted Cassidy, Lee J. Cobb, Raymond Massey, Burgess Meredith, Anthony Quayle, Edward G. Robinson, Eli Wallach, Eduardo Ciannelli, Dick Peabody, Rudy Diaz, Robert Phillips, Shelley Morrison, Trevor Bardette, Victor Jory, Ron Soble	
M A Y	14	Krakatoa, East of Java	Cinerama Releasing Corporation	Bernard L. Kowalski (director); Bernard Gordon, Clifford Newton Gould (screenplay); Maximilian Schell, Diane Baker, Brian Keith, Barbara Werle, Sal Mineo, Rossano Brazzi, John Leyton, J.D. Cannon, Jacqui Chan, Marc Lawrence, Midori, Niall MacGinnis, Sumi Haru, Geoffrey Holder, Peter Graves, Robert Hall, Victoria Young, Joseph Hann, Alan Hoskins, Peter Kowalski	
M A Y	15	Nightmare in Wax	Avatar Communications / Crown International Pictures	Bud Townsend (director); Rex Carlton (screenplay); Cameron Mitchell, Anne Helm, Scott Brady, Berry Kroeger, Johnny Cardos, Victoria Carroll, James Forrest, Virgil Frye, Kent Osborne	
M A Y	25	Midnight Cowboy	United Artists / Jerome Hellman Productions / Mist Entertainment	John Schlesinger (director); Waldo Salt (screenplay); Jon Voight, Dustin Hoffman, Sylvia Miles, John McGiver, Brenda Vaccaro, Barnard Hughes, Ruth White, Jennifer Salt, Gilman Rankin, Georgann Johnson, Anthony Holland, Bob Balaban, Viva, International Velvet, Ultra Violet, Paul Jabara, Taylor Mead, Paul Morrissey, Pat Ast, Randall Carver, Marlene Clark, Sandy Duncan, Waldo Salt, Larry Sherman, M. Emmet Walsh, Paul Rossilli, Craig Carrington, Cecelia Lipson	
M A Y	27	Popi	United Artists	Arthur Hiller (director); Tina Pine, Lester Pine (screenplay); Alan Arkin, Rita Moreno, Reuben Figueroa, Miguel Alejandro, Arny Freeman, Joan Tompkins, Anthony Holland, Louis Zorich, Antonia Rey, Richard Hamilton, John Harkins, Judith Lowry, Gary Morgan	
M A Y	28	The April Fools	National General Pictures / Cinema Center Films / Jalem Productions	Stuart Rosenberg (director); Hal Dresner (screenplay); Jack Lemmon, Catherine Deneuve, Peter Lawford, Jack Weston, Myrna Loy, Charles Boyer, Janice Carroll, Sally Kellerman, Gary Dubin, Melinda Dillon, Kenneth Mars, David Doyle, Harvey Korman, Sherry Lansing, Felix Silla, Susan Barrett, Dee Gardner, Lisa Todd	
M A Y	29	Carry On Camping	The Rank Organisation	Gerald Thomas (director); Talbot Rothwell (screenplay); Sid James, Kenneth Williams, Joan Sims, Charles Hawtrey, Terry Scott, Barbara Windsor, Bernard Bresslaw, Hattie Jacques, Peter Butterworth, Julian Holloway, Dilys Laye, Betty Marsden, Sandra Caron, Trisha Noble, Amelia Bayntun, Brian Oulton, Patricia Franklin, Derek Francis, Michael Nightingale, George Moon, Elizabeth Knight, Georgina Moon, Anna Karen, Valerie Leon, Angela Grant, Walter Henry, Valerie Shute, Vivien Lloyd, Jennifer Pyle, Lesley Duff, Jackie Pool, Sally Kemp	
M A Y	30	Che!	20th Century-Fox	Richard Fleischer (director); Michael Wilson, Sy Bartlett (screenplay); Omar Sharif, Jack Palance, Cesare Danova, Robert Loggia, Woody Strode, Barbara Luna, Frank Silvera, Albert Paulsen, Linda Marsh, Tom Troupe, Sid Haig, Adolph Caesar, Paul Picerni, Perry Lopez, Abraham Sofaer, Gil Serna, Rodolfo Acosta, Jesús Franco, Joe Gray, John F. Kennedy, Adlai Stevenson, Valerian Zorin, Rudy Diaz, Richard Angarola, Sarita Vara, Paul Bertoya, Ray Martell	
J U N E	8	That Cold Day in the Park	Commonwealth United	Robert Altman (director); Gillian Freeman (screenplay); Sandy Dennis, Michael Burns, Susanne Benton, Luana Anders, Linda Sorenson, Michael Murphy, David Garfield, Edward Greenhalgh, Lloyd Berry, Rae Brown, Doris Buckingham, Frank Wade, Alicia Ammon	
J U N E	11	The First Time	United Artists / The Mirisch Production Company	James Neilson (director); Jo Heims, Roger Smith (screenplay); Jacqueline Bisset, Wes Stern, Rick Kelman, Wink Roberts, Gerard Parkes, Cosette Lee, Sharon Acker	
J U N E	12	Blue Movie	Andy Warhol Films	Andy Warhol (director/screenplay); Louis Waldon, Viva	
J U N E	13	True Grit	Paramount Pictures	Henry Hathaway (director); Marguerite Roberts (screenplay); John Wayne, Glen Campbell, Kim Darby, Jeremy Slate, Robert Duvall, Dennis Hopper, Alfred Ryder, Strother Martin, Jeff Corey, Ron Soble, John Fiedler, James Westerfield, John Doucette, Donald Woods, Edith Atwater, Carlos Rivas, H.W. Gim, John Pickard, Elizabeth Harrower, Ken Renard, Wilford Brimley, Albert Cavens, Chuck Hayward, Myron Healey, James McEachin, Stuart Randall, Clark Ross, Connie Sawyer, Jay Silverheels, Dean Smith, Max Wagner, Guy Wilkerson, Hank Worden, Isabel Boniface, Jay Ripley, Kenneth Becker	
J U N E	18	Eye of the Cat	Universal Pictures	David Lowell Rich (director); Joseph Stefano (screenplay); Michael Sarrazin, Gayle Hunnicutt, Eleanor Parker, Tim Henry, Laurence Naismith, Jennifer Leak, Linden Chiles, Mark Herron	
J U N E	18	The Wild Bunch	Warner Bros.-Seven Arts	Sam Peckinpah (director); Walon Green (screenplay); William Holden, Ernest Borgnine, Robert Ryan, Edmond O'Brien, Warren Oates, Jaime Sánchez, Ben Johnson, Emilio Fernández, Strother Martin, L.Q. Jones, Albert Dekker, Bo Hopkins, Jorge Russek, Alfonso Arau, Dub Taylor, Chano Urueta, Elsa Cárdenas, Fernando Wagner, Rayford Barnes, Sonia Amelio, Aurora Clavel, Enrique Lucero, Elizabeth Dupeyrón, Robert 'Buzz' Henry, Sheb Wooley, Paul Harper, Bill Bart, Stephen Ferry	
J U N E	19	Last Summer	Allied Artists / Alsid Productions	Frank Perry (director); Eleanor Perry (screenplay); Barbara Hershey, Richard Thomas, Bruce Davison, Catherine Burns, Ernesto Gonzalez, Conrad Bain, Eileen Letchworth, Maeve McGuire, Peter Turgeon, Ralph Waite	
J U N E	24	Chastity	American International Pictures / Progress Motion Pictures	Alessio de Paola (director); Sonny Bono (screenplay); Cher, Stephen Whittaker, Barbara London, Tom Nolan	
J U N E	25	The Bridge at Remagen	United Artists / The Wolper Organization, Ltd.	John Guillermin (director); William Roberts, Richard Yates (screenplay); George Segal, Robert Vaughn, Ben Gazzara, Bradford Dillman, E.G. Marshall, Peter van Eyck, Hans Christian Blech, Heinz Reincke, Joachim Hansen, Sonja Ziemann, Anna Gaël, Bo Hopkins, Matt Clark, Steve Sandor, Tom Heaton, Richard Münch, Günter Meisner, Rudolf Jelínek, Vít Olmer, Robert Logan, Frank Webb, Paul Prokop	
J U N E	26	The Chairman	20th Century Fox / APJAC Productions	J. Lee Thompson (director); Ben Maddow (screenplay); Gregory Peck, Anne Heywood, Arthur Hill, Alan Dobie, Conrad Yama, Zienia Merton, Ori Levy, Eric Young, Burt Kwouk, Alan White, Keye Luke, Francesca Tu, Gordon Sterne, Robert Lee, Helen Horton, Simon Cain, Anthony Chinn, Janet Key, Judy Matheson	
J U N E	27	Hello Down There	Paramount Pictures / Ivan Tors Productions	Jack Arnold (director); John McGreevey, Frank Telford (screenplay); Tony Randall, Janet Leigh, Roddy McDowall, Jim Backus, Ken Berry, Charlotte Rae, Richard Dreyfuss, Lou Wagner, Arnold Stang, Harvey Lembeck, Merv Griffin, Lee Meredith, Bruce Gordon, Henny Backus, Pat Henning, Kay Cole, Gary Tigerman, Frank Schuller, Jay Laskey, Bud Hoey	

== July–September ==
Opening		Title	Production company	Cast and crew	Ref.
J U L Y	7	How to Commit Marriage	Cinerama Releasing Corporation / Naho Productions	Norman Panama (director); Michael Kanin, Ben Starr (screenplay); Bob Hope, Jackie Gleason, Jane Wyman, Leslie Nielsen, Maureen Arthur, Tina Louise, Tim Matheson, Paul Stewart, Irwin Corey, Joanna Cameron, Don Brodie, David Burns, Lauren Gilbert, Anne Seymour	
J U L Y	10	Putney Swope	Cinema V / Herald Productions	Robert Downey Sr. (director/screenplay); Arnold Johnson, Stan Gottlieb, Allen Garfield, Robert Downey Sr., Alan Abel, Antonio Fargas, Allan Arbus, Ronnie Dyson, Shelley Plimpton, Elżbieta Czyżewska, Ramon Gordon, Bert Lawrence, Joe Madden, David Kirk, Don George, Tom Odachi, Ching Yeh, Spunky-Funk Johnson, Joe Fields, Robert Staats, Sol Brawerman, Ben Israel, Catherine Lojacano, JohnJohn Robinson, Walter Jones, Khaula Bakr, Laura Greene, Eric Krupnik, George Morgan, William H. Boesen, Cerves McNeill, Charles Green, Pepi Hermine, Ruth Hermine, Lawrence Wolf, Jeff Lord, Tom Boya, Lloyd Kagin, Perry Gewritz, George Marshall, Fred Hirshhorn, Donahl Breitman, Peter Benson	
J U L Y	11	The Lost Man	Universal Pictures	Robert Alan Aurthur (director/screenplay); Sidney Poitier, Joanna Shimkus, Al Freeman Jr., Michael Tolan, Leon Bibb, Richard Dysart, David Steinberg, Beverly Todd, Paul Winfield, Bernie Hamilton, Richard Anthony Williams, Dolph Sweet, Arnold Williams, Virginia Capers, Vonetta McGee, Frank Marth, Maxine Stuart, George Tyne, Paulene Myers, Lee Weaver, Lincoln Kilpatrick, Sonny Landham	
J U L Y	13	Me, Natalie	National General Pictures / Cinema Center Films / Nob Hill Productions	Fred Coe (director); A. Martin Zweiback (screenplay); Patty Duke, James Farentino, Salome Jens, Elsa Lanchester, Martin Balsam, Nancy Marchand, Philip Sterling, Deborah Winters, Ron Hale, Bob Balaban, Matthew Cowles, Al Pacino, Catherine Burns, Robyn Morgan, Peter Turgeon, Milt Kamen, Susan Lucci, Ann Thomas, Robert Frink, Dennis Allen	
J U L Y	14	Easy Rider	Columbia Pictures / The Pando Company / Raybert Productions	Dennis Hopper (director/screenplay); Peter Fonda, Terry Southern (screenplay); Peter Fonda, Dennis Hopper, Jack Nicholson, Luke Askew, Phil Spector, Karen Black, Toni Basil, Warren Finnerty, Luana Anders, Sabrina Scharf, Robert Walker Jr., Michael Pataki, Bridget Fonda, Virgil Frye, Dan Haggerty, Randee Lynne Jensen, Helena Kallianiotes, Carrie Snodgress, Antonio Mendoza, Mac Mashourian, Tita Colorado, Sandy Brown Wyeth	
J U L Y	18	The Appointment	Metro-Goldwyn-Mayer	Sidney Lumet (director); James Salter (screenplay); Omar Sharif, Anouk Aimée, Lotte Lenya, Didi Perego, Fausto Tozzi, Gigi Proietti, Paola Barbara, Ennio Balbo	
J U L Y	19	The Mighty Gorga	American General Pictures	David L. Hewitt (director); Robert Vincent O'Neil (screenplay); Anthony Eisley, Megan Timothy, Scott Brady, Kent Taylor, Gary Kent, Greydon Clark, Gary Graver, David L. Hewitt, Sheldon Lee, Lee Parrish, John Parker, William Bonner, Bruce Kimball	
A U G U S T	6	The Learning Tree	Warner Bros.-Seven Arts	Gordon Parks (director/screenplay); Kyle Johnson, Alex Clarke, Estelle Evans, Dana Elcar, Mira Waters, Joel Fluellen, Malcolm Atterbury, Richard Ward, Russell Thorson, Peggy Rea, Kevin Hagen, James Rushing, Dub Taylor, Felix Nelson, George Mitchell, Don Dubbins, Jon Lormer, Thomas Anderson, Hope Summers, Zooey Hall, Lynn Hamilton	
A U G U S T	9	The Love God?	Universal Pictures	Nat Hiken (director/screenplay); Don Knotts, Anne Francis, Edmond O'Brien, James Gregory, Maureen Arthur, Maggie Peterson, Jesslyn Fax, Jacques Aubuchon, Marjorie Bennett, Jim Boles, Ruth McDevitt, Roy Stuart, Herb Voland, James Westerfield, Bob Hastings, Larry McCormick, Willis Bouchey, Herbie Faye, Johnny Seven, Joseph V. Perry, Jim Begg, Carla Borelli, Aleshia Brevard, B.S. Pully, Barbara Bosson, Albert Cavens, Frank Coghlan Jr., Minta Durfee	
A U G U S T	9	Take the Money and Run	Cinerama Releasing Corporation / ABC Pictures / Palomar Pictures International	Woody Allen (director/screenplay); Mickey Rose (screenplay); Woody Allen, Janet Margolin, Marcel Hillaire, Lonny Chapman, Jan Merlin, James Anderson, Howard Storm, Mark Gordon, Dan Frazer, Louise Lasser, Jackson Beck, Dwight D. Eisenhower, Roy Engel, Kaiser Wilhelm II, Richard Nixon, Janos Prohaska, Mickey Rose, Jacquelyn Hyde, Micil Murphy, Minnow Moskowitz, Nate Jacobson, Grace Bauer, Ethel Sokolow, Henry Leff, Mike O'Dowd	
A U G U S T	18	Alice's Restaurant	United Artists	Arthur Penn (director/screenplay); Venable Herndon (screenplay); Arlo Guthrie, Pat Quinn, James Broderick, Pete Seeger, Lee Hays, William Obanhein, Tina Chen, Vinnette Carroll, Shelley Plimpton, M. Emmet Walsh, Graham Jarvis, Joni Mitchell, Michael McClanathan, Geoff Outlaw, Kathleen Dabney, James Hannon, Seth Allen, Monroe Arnold, Joseph Boley, Sylvia Davis, Simm Landres, Eulalie Noble, Louis Beachner, MacIntyre Dixon, Arthur Pierce Middleton, Donald Marye	
A U G U S T	20	What Ever Happened to Aunt Alice?	Cinerama Releasing Corporation / Palomar Pictures Corporation / The Associates & Aldrich Company	Lee H. Katzin (director); Theodore Apstein (screenplay); Geraldine Page, Ruth Gordon, Rosemary Forsyth, Robert Fuller, Mildred Dunnock, Peter Bonerz, Claire Kelly, Martin Garralaga, Jack Bannon, Seth Riggs, Joan Huntington, Peter Brandon, Michael Barbera, Richard Angarola, Valerie Allen	
A U G U S T	27	Medium Cool	Paramount Pictures / H & J Pictures	Haskell Wexler (director/screenplay); Robert Forster, Verna Bloom, Peter Bonerz, Marianna Hill, Peter Boyle, Felton Perry, China Lee, Richard J. Daley, Jesse Jackson, Robert F. Kennedy, Martin Luther King, Haskell Wexler, Harold Blankenship, Charles Geary, Sid McCoy, Christine Bergstrom	
A U G U S T	28	The Gypsy Moths	Metro-Goldwyn-Mayer / Edward Lewis Productions / John Frankenheimer Productions / Landers-Roberts Productions	John Frankenheimer (director); William Hanley (screenplay); Burt Lancaster, Deborah Kerr, Gene Hackman, Scott Wilson, William Windom, Bonnie Bedelia, Sheree North, Carl Reindel, Ford Rainey, John Napier, Wendell Burton, Amzie Strickland, Bill Zuckert	
S E P T E M B E R	3	The Trouble with Girls	Metro-Goldwyn-Mayer	Peter Tewksbury (director); Arnold Peyser, Lois Peyser (screenplay); Elvis Presley, Marlyn Mason, Nicole Jaffe, Sheree North, Edward Andrews, John Carradine, Anissa Jones, Vincent Price, Joyce Van Patten, Dabney Coleman, Bill Zuckert, Anthony Teague, Med Flory, Robert Nichols, Frank Welker, John Rubinstein, Chuck Briles, Patsy Garrett, Charles P. Thompson, Brett Parker, Danny Bonaduce, Bill Lee, Gene Merlino, William H. O'Brien, Susan Olsen, Thurl Ravenscroft, Del "Sonny" West	
S E P T E M B E R	5	The Valley of Gwangi	Warner Bros.-Seven Arts / Charles H. Schneer Productions	Jim O'Connolly (director); William Bast, Julian More, Willis H. O'Brien (screenplay); James Franciscus, Gila Golan, Richard Carlson, Laurence Naismith, Freda Jackson, Gustavo Rojo, Mario de Barros, Dennis Kilbane, Jose Burgos, Curtis Arden	
S E P T E M B E R	5	The Bushbaby	Metro-Goldwyn-Mayer	John Trent (director); Robert Maxwell, William Stevenson (screenplay); Margaret Brooks, Louis Gossett, Donald Houston, Laurence Naismith, Marne Maitland, Geoffrey Bayldon, Jack Gwillim, Noel Howlett, Harold Goodwin, Charles Hyatt, Simon Lack, Victor Maddern, Martin Wyldeck	
S E P T E M B E R	17	Bob & Carol & Ted & Alice	Columbia Pictures / Frankovich Productions	Paul Mazursky (director/screenplay); Larry Tucker (screenplay); Natalie Wood, Robert Culp, Elliott Gould, Dyan Cannon, Lee Bergere, K.T. Stevens, Celeste Yarnall, Lynn Borden, Greg Mullavey, Andre Philippe, John Brent, Garry Goodrow, Bill Cosby, George DeNormand, Leif Garrett, Michael Z. Gordon, Hawk Koch, Paul Mazursky, John S. Ragin, Connie Sawyer, Larry Tucker, Renata Vanni, Joey D. Vieira, Horst Ebersberg, Noble Lee Holderread Jr.	
S E P T E M B E R	29	De Sade	American International Pictures	Cy Endfield (director); Richard Matheson (screenplay); Keir Dullea, Senta Berger, Lilli Palmer, Anna Massey, Sonja Ziemann, John Huston, Christiane Krüger, Uta Levka, Barbara Stanek, Susanne von Almassy, Friedrich Schoenfelder, Herbert Weissbach, Maria Caleita, Barboura Morris	

== October–December ==
Opening		Title	Production company	Cast and crew	Ref.
O C T O B E R	4	Hail, Hero!	National General Pictures / Cinema Center Films	David Miller (director); David Manber (screenplay); Michael Douglas, Arthur Kennedy, Teresa Wright, John Larch, Louise Latham, Charles Drake, Peter Strauss, Deborah Winters, Mercer Harris, Virginia Christine, Mario Alcalde, Carmen Zapata, Heather Menzies, James Nusser, John Qualen, Charles Wagenheim, Marjorie Eaton, Burt Mustin, Walter Baldwin, Peter Brocco	
O C T O B E R	5	A Walk with Love and Death	20th Century Fox	John Huston (director); Dale Wasserman (screenplay); Anjelica Huston, Assaf Dayan, Anthony Corlan, John Hallam, Robert Lang, Guy Deghy, Michael Gough, George Murcell, Anthony Nicholls, Joseph O'Connor, John Huston, Melvyn Hayes, Nicholas Smith, Gilles Ségal, Med Hondo, Robert Rietti, Eileen Murphy, John Franklyn, Francis Heim, Barry Keegan, Antoinette Reuss, Luis Masson, Eugen Ledebur, Otto Dworak, Max Sulz, John Veenenbos, Dieter Tressler, Paul Hör, Myra Malik, Michael Baronne, Yvan Strogoff	
O C T O B E R	6	The Royal Hunt of the Sun	National General Pictures / Cinema Center Films / Security Pictures	Irving Lerner (director); Philip Yordan (screenplay); Robert Shaw, Christopher Plummer, Nigel Davenport, Michael Craig, Andrew Keir, William Marlowe, James Donald, Leonard Whiting, Alexander Davion, Shmulik Kraus, Percy Herbert, David Bauer, Robert Rietti	
O C T O B E R	8	The Good Guys and the Bad Guys	Warner Bros.-Seven Arts	Burt Kennedy (director); Ronald M. Cohen, Dennis Shryack (screenplay); Robert Mitchum, George Kennedy, Martin Balsam, David Carradine, Tina Louise, Douglas V. Fowley, Lois Nettleton, John Davis Chandler, John Carradine, Marie Windsor, Dick Peabody, Kathleen Freeman, Garrett Lewis, Nick Dennis, Dorothy Adams, Thordis Brandt, David Cargo, David S. Cass Sr., Noble "Kid" Chissell, George Dunn, Richard Farnsworth, Bobby Gilbert, Angela Greene, Buddy Hackett, Darby Hinton, Jackie Joseph, Christopher Mitchum, Jack Perkins, John Wheeler	
O C T O B E R	8	The Monitors	Commonwealth United Entertainment / Bell & Howell Productions / Wilding Inc. / Second City Productions	Jack Shea (director); Myron J. Gold (screenplay); Guy Stockwell, Susan Oliver, Larry Storch, Avery Schreiber, Sherry Jackson, Shepperd Strudwick, Keenan Wynn, Ed Begley, Mike Nussbaum, Murphy Dunne, Peter Boyle, Jackie Vernon, Alan Arkin, Adam Arkin, Matthew Arkin, Xavier Cugat, Barbara Dana, Everett Dirksen, Stubby Kaye, Lynne Lipton	
O C T O B E R	12	The Madwoman of Chaillot	Warner Bros.-Seven Arts / Commonwealth United Entertainment	Bryan Forbes (director); Edward Anhalt (screenplay); Katharine Hepburn, Charles Boyer, Claude Dauphin, Edith Evans, John Gavin, Paul Henreid, Oskar Homolka, Margaret Leighton, Giulietta Masina, Nanette Newman, Richard Chamberlain, Yul Brynner, Donald Pleasence, Danny Kaye, Henri Virlogeux, Gordon Heath, George Hilsdon, Gerald Sim, Gilles Ségal, Fernand Gravey, Michael Wilding	
O C T O B E R	15	Paint Your Wagon	Paramount Pictures / Alan Jay Lerner Productions / The Malpaso Company	Joshua Logan (director); Alan Jay Lerner (screenplay); Lee Marvin, Clint Eastwood, Jean Seberg, Harve Presnell, Ray Walston, Tom Ligon, Alan Dexter, William O'Connell, Ben Baker, Alan Baxter, Paula Trueman, Robert Easton, H.B. Haggerty, John Mitchum, Sue Casey, Eddie Little Sky, H.W. Gim, Roy Jenson, Nitty Gritty Dirt Band, Rodney Bingenheimer, Joe Brooks, Tony Epper, Richard Farnsworth, Tony Giorgio, Harry Lauter, John McEuen, Dar Robinson, David Sharpe, Patricia Smith, Buddy Van Horn, Geoffrey Norman, Terry Jenkins, Karl Bruck, Harvey Parry, William Mims, Pat Hawley	
O C T O B E R	22	Marlowe	Metro-Goldwyn-Mayer	Paul Bogart (director); Stirling Silliphant (screenplay); James Garner, Gayle Hunnicutt, Carroll O'Connor, Rita Moreno, Sharon Farrell, William Daniels, H.M. Wynant, Jackie Coogan, Kenneth Tobey, Bruce Lee, Christopher Cary, George Tyne, Corinne Camacho, Paul Stevens, Roger Newman, Read Morgan, Anna Lee Carroll, Warren Finnerty, Greta Garbo, Hoke Howell, Nicole Jaffe, Tom Monroe, Bartlett Robinson, Mary Wilcox, Jason Wingreen	
O C T O B E R	22	The Sterile Cuckoo	Paramount Pictures	Alan J. Pakula (director); Alvin Sargent (screenplay); Liza Minnelli, Wendell Burton, Tim McIntire, Sandy Faison, Elizabeth Harrower, Margaret Markov	
O C T O B E R	24	Butch Cassidy and the Sundance Kid	20th Century Fox / Campanile Productions / Newman-Foreman Company	George Roy Hill (director); William Goldman (screenplay); Paul Newman, Robert Redford, Katharine Ross, Strother Martin, Henry Jones, Jeff Corey, George Furth, Cloris Leachman, Ted Cassidy, Kenneth Mars, Donnelly Rhodes, Jody Gilbert, Timothy Scott, Don Keefer, Charles Dierkop, Pancho Córdova, Nelson Olmstead, Paul Bryar, Sam Elliott, Eric Sinclair, Ken Drake, Percy Helton, Enrique Lucero, Jorge Russek	
N O V E M B E R	6	Downhill Racer	Paramount Pictures / Wildwood	Michael Ritchie (director); James Salter (screenplay); Robert Redford, Gene Hackman, Camilla Sparv, Karl Michael Vogler, Jim McMullan, Kathleen Crowley, Dabney Coleman, Jerry Dexter, Peter Rohr, Christian Doermer, Michael Gempart, Noam Pitlik, Kenneth Kirk, Oren Stevens, Rip McManus	
N O V E M B E R	10	Change of Habit	Universal Pictures / NBC Productions	William A. Graham (director); James Lee, S.S. Schweitzer, Eric Bercovici (screenplay); Elvis Presley, Mary Tyler Moore, Barbara McNair, Jane Elliot, Leora Dana, Edward Asner, Robert Emhardt, Regis Toomey, Doro Merande, Ruth McDevitt, Richard Carlson, Virginia Vincent, Ji-Tu Cumbuka, William Elliott, Rodolfo Hoyos, Jim Beach, Timothy Carey, Steve Conte, Stella Garcia, Pepe Hern, Darlene Love, A Martinez, Troy Melton, Lenny Montana, Charlie Hodge, Nefti Millet, Laura Figueroa, Lorena Kirk, David Renard	
N O V E M B E R	10	Flareup	Metro-Goldwyn-Mayer / GMF	James Neilson (director); Mark Rodgers (screenplay); Raquel Welch, James Stacy, Luke Askew, Don Chastain, Ron Rifkin, Jean Byron, Sandra Giles, Mary Wilcox, Steve Conte, Tom Fadden, Douglas Rowe, Gordon Jump, Ike Williams, Pat Delaney, Kay Peters, Joe Billings, Carol-Jean Thompson, Carl Byrd, Michael Rougas, David Moses, Will J. White	
N O V E M B E R	10	Marooned	Columbia Pictures	John Sturges (director); Mayo Simon (screenplay); Gregory Peck, Richard Crenna, David Janssen, James Franciscus, Gene Hackman, Lee Grant, Nancy Kovack, Mariette Hartley, Scott Brady, Frank Marth, Walter Brooke, George Gaynes, Martin Caidin, John Forsythe, Mauritz Hugo, John S. Ragin, George R. Robertson, Craig Huebing, John Carter, Vincent Van Lynn, Tom Stewart, Bill Couch	
N O V E M B E R	10	Don't Drink the Water	Avco Embassy Pictures	Howard Morris (director); R.S. Allen, Harvey Bullock (screenplay); Jackie Gleason, Estelle Parsons, Ted Bessell, Joan Delaney, Michael Constantine, Howard St. John, Danny Meehan, Richard Libertini, Avery Schreiber, Mark Gordon, Phil Leeds, Pierre Olaf, Howard Morris	
N O V E M B E R	15	The Arrangement	Warner Bros.-Seven Arts	Elia Kazan (director/screenplay); Kirk Douglas, Faye Dunaway, Deborah Kerr, Richard Boone, Hume Cronyn, Michael Higgins, Carol Rossen, William Hansen, Harold Gould, Michael Murphy, John Randolph Jones, Anne Hegira, Charles Drake, E.J. Andre, Philip Bourneuf, Dianne Hull, Donna Anderson, Brian Andrews, Steve Bond, Stephen Coit, Francis de Sales, Ann Doran, Clint Kimbrough, Maureen McCormick, Philo McCullough, Paul Newlan, Robert Shayne, Barry Sullivan	
N O V E M B E R	19	The Comic	Columbia Pictures / Acre Enterprises	Carl Reiner (director/screenplay); Aaron Ruben (screenplay); Dick Van Dyke, Michele Lee, Mickey Rooney, Cornel Wilde, Nina Wayne, Pert Kelton, Steve Allen, Barbara Heller, Ed Peck, Jeannine Riley, Gavin MacLeod, Jay Novello, Paulene Myers, Fritz Feld, Jerome Cowan, Isabel Sanford, Jeff Donnell, Carl Reiner, Lillian Adams, Paul Bradley, Peter Brocco, Calvin Coolidge, Billy Curtis, Maurice Dallimore, Geoff Edwards, Paul Frees, Leonard Frey, Ethelreda Leopold, Mantan Moreland, Howard Morris, Ottola Nesmith, William H. O'Brien, Mark Russell, Cosmo Sardo, Johnny Silver, Irene Tedrow, Johnny Weissmuller, Jean Willes, Dick Winslow, Bill Zuckert	
N O V E M B E R	26	Angel, Angel, Down We Go	American International Pictures	Robert Thom (director/screenplay); Jennifer Jones, Jordan Christopher, Holly Near, Lou Rawls, Charles Aidman, Davey Davison, Roddy McDowall, Marty Brill	
N O V E M B E R	27	The Undefeated	20th Century Fox	Andrew V. McLaglen (director); James Lee Barrett (screenplay); John Wayne, Rock Hudson, Antonio Aguilar, Roman Gabriel, Marian McCargo, Lee Meriwether, Merlin Olsen, Melissa Newman, Bruce Cabot, Jan-Michael Vincent, Ben Johnson, Edward Faulkner, Harry Carey Jr., Paul Fix, Royal Dano, Richard Mulligan, Carlos Rivas, John Agar, Guy Raymond, Don Collier, Big John Hamilton, Dub Taylor, Henry Beckman, Victor Junco, Robert Donner, Pedro Armendáriz Jr., James Dobson, James McEachin, Gregg Palmer, Juan García, Kiel Martin, Hal Needham, Chuck Roberson	
D E C E M B E R	4	A Boy Named Charlie Brown	National General Pictures / Cinema Center Films / Lee Mendelson/Bill Melendez Productions / United Feature Syndicate	Bill Melendez (director); Charles M. Schulz (screenplay); Peter Robbins, Pamelyn Ferdin, Glenn Gilger, Andy Pforsich, Sally Dryer, Bill Melendez, Anne Altieri, Erin Sullivan, Lynda Mendelson, Christopher DeFaria, Hilary Momberger-Powers	
D E C E M B E R	10	They Shoot Horses, Don't They?	Cinerama Releasing Corporation / ABC Pictures / Palomar Pictures	Sydney Pollack (director); Robert E. Thompson, James Poe (screenplay); Jane Fonda, Michael Sarrazin, Susannah York, Gig Young, Red Buttons, Bonnie Bedelia, Michael Conrad, Bruce Dern, Al Lewis, Robert Fields, Severn Darden, Allyn Ann McLerie, Madge Kennedy, Jacquelyn Hyde, Felice Orlandi, Arthur Metrano, Paul Mantee, Tim Herbert, Noble "Kid" Chissell, Ian Abercrombie, John Alvin, Teddy Buckner, Fritzi Burr, Jack Colvin, Minta Durfee, Teddy Edwards, Marilyn Hassett, Ethelreda Leopold, Philo McCullough, Beverlee McKinsey, Cynthia Myers, Tucker Smith, Arthur Tovey	
D E C E M B E R	14	John and Mary	20th Century Fox	Peter Yates (director); John Mortimer (screenplay); Dustin Hoffman, Mia Farrow, Michael Tolan, Stanley Beck, Tyne Daly, Marian Mercer, Olympia Dukakis, Cleavon Little, Marilyn Chris, Kristoffer Tabori, Hy Anzell, Jennifer Salt, Bill Weeden, Stephen Young, Sunny Griffin, Alix Elias, Julie Garfield, Marvin Lichterman, Susan Taylor	
D E C E M B E R	14	Generation	AVCO Embassy Pictures	George Schaefer (director); William Goodhart (screenplay); David Janssen, Kim Darby, Carl Reiner, Pete Duel, Andrew Prine, James Coco, Sam Waterston, David Lewis, Don Beddoe, Jack Somack, Lincoln Kilpatrick	
D E C E M B E R	16	Cactus Flower	Columbia Pictures / Frankovich Productions	Gene Saks (director); I.A.L. Diamond (screenplay); Walter Matthau, Ingrid Bergman, Goldie Hawn, Jack Weston, Rick Lenz, Vito Scotti, Irene Hervey, Barbara Randolph, Lucy Saroyan, Eve Bruce, Irwin Charone, Matthew Saks	
D E C E M B E R	16	Gaily, Gaily	United Artists / The Mirisch Corporation	Norman Jewison (director); Abram S. Ginnes (screenplay); Beau Bridges, Melina Mercouri, Brian Keith, George Kennedy, Hume Cronyn, Margot Kidder, Wilfrid Hyde-White, John Randolph, Bill Durham, Merie Earle, Claudia Bryar, Eric Shea, Roy Barcroft, Harry Holcombe, Harvey Jason, Peter Brocco, Cliff Emmich, Don Keefer, Nora Marlowe, Roy Poole, Melodie Johnson, Joan Huntington	
D E C E M B E R	16	Hello, Dolly!	20th Century Fox / Chenault Productions	Gene Kelly (director); Ernest Lehman (screenplay); Barbra Streisand, Walter Matthau, Michael Crawford, Marianne McAndrew, E. J. Peaker, Danny Lockin, Tommy Tune, David Hurst, Fritz Feld, J. Pat O'Malley, Louis Armstrong, Rutanya Alda, Frank Baker, George Barrows, William "Billy" Benedict, Billy Bletcher, James Chandler, Scatman Crothers, Billy Curtis, Linda Dano, Frank Delfino, George DeNormand, Lester Dorr, Sam Edwards, Jeannie Epper, Morgan Farley, William Fawcett, Jennifer Gan, James Hibbard, Shep Houghton, Charles Lampkin, Nolan Leary, Ted Mapes, Jerry Maren, Michael Mark, Robert Neal Marshall, Philo McCullough, James McEachin, Tyler McVey, Gary Menteer, Harry Monty, Patrick O'Moore, Joe Ploski, Eddie Quillan, Jack Raine, Cosmo Sardo, Tucker Smith, Georgina Spelvin, Marilyn Tindall, Arthur Tovey, USC Trojan Marching Band, Charles Wagenheim, Guy Wilkerson, Melissa Stafford, Gilda Maiken, Joyce Ames, Judy Knaiz, Richard Collier	
D E C E M B E R	18	On Her Majesty's Secret Service	United Artists / Eon Productions	Peter R. Hunt (director); Richard Maibaum (screenplay); George Lazenby, Diana Rigg, Telly Savalas, Gabriele Ferzetti, Ilse Steppat, Lois Maxwell, George Baker, Bernard Lee, Bernard Horsfall, Desmond Llewelyn, Yuri Borienko, Virginia North, James Bree, Angela Scoular, Catherine Schell, Julie Ege, Joanna Lumley, Anouska Hempel, Jenny Hanley, Honor Blackman, Shakira Caine, David de Keyser, Takis Emmanuel, Judy Geeson, Richard Graydon, Peter R. Hunt, George Leech, Bessie Love, Luciana Paluzzi, Steve Plytas, Robert Rietty, Nikki Van Der Zyl, Brian Worth, Geoffrey Cheshire, Irvin Allen, Terry Mountain, John Gay	
D E C E M B E R	18	Tell Them Willie Boy Is Here	Universal Pictures	Abraham Polonsky (director/screenplay); Robert Redford, Katharine Ross, Robert Blake, Susan Clark, Barry Sullivan, John Vernon, Charles Aidman, Charles McGraw, Shelly Novack, Lloyd Gough, Ned Romero, John Wheeler, Garry Walberg, George Tyne, Lee de Broux, Lou Frizzell, Robert Lipton, Erik Holland, Jerry Velasco, Wayne Sutherlin, Jerome Raphael	
D E C E M B E R	19	Topaz	Universal Pictures	Alfred Hitchcock (director); Samuel A. Taylor (screenplay); Frederick Stafford, Dany Robin, John Vernon, Karin Dor, Claude Jade, Michel Subor, Michel Piccoli, Philippe Noiret, Roscoe Lee Browne, Per-Axel Arosenius, John Forsythe, Edmon Ryan, Tina Hedström, John van Dreelen, Donald Randolph, Roberto Contreras, Carlos Rivas, Roger Til, Sándor Szabó, Anna Navarro, Fidel Castro, Richard Derr, Ann Doran, Noel Drayton, Abel Fernandez, Gregory Gaye, Ernesto "Che" Guevara, Alfred Hitchcock, Shep Houghton, Ray Kellogg, Henry Kingi, Al Lewis, Lawrence Montaigne, William H. O'Brien, John Stephenson, Sonja Kolthoff, Lewis Charles, Lew Brown, John Roper, George Skaff	
D E C E M B E R	24	The Computer Wore Tennis Shoes	Walt Disney Productions / Buena Vista Distribution	Robert Butler (director); Joseph L. McEveety (screenplay); Kurt Russell, Cesar Romero, Joe Flynn, William Schallert, Alan Hewitt, Richard Bakalyan, Michael McGreevey, Jon Provost, Frank Welker, Bing Russell, Pat Harrington, Fritz Feld, Pete Renoudet, Ed Begley Jr., David Canary, John Cliff, Howard Culver, George DeNormand, William Fawcett, Robert Foulk, Myron Healey, Shep Houghton, Heather Menzies, Byron Morrow, George N. Neise, Judson Pratt, Mark Russell, Cosmo Sardo, Olan Soule, Debbie Paine, Frank Webb, Alexander Clarke, Fabian Dean, Hillyard Anderson, Gail Bonney, Gregory Morton	
D E C E M B E R	25	The Reivers	National General Pictures / Cinema Center Films / Duo Films / Solar Productions	Mark Rydell (director); Harriet Frank Jr., Irving Ravetch (screenplay); Steve McQueen, Sharon Farrell, Mitch Vogel, Ruth White, Michael Constantine, Clifton James, Juano Hernandez, Lonny Chapman, Will Geer, Rupert Crosse, Diane Shalet, Diane Ladd, Ellen Geer, Dub Taylor, Allyn Ann McLerie, Bill Durham, Shug Fisher, Raymond Guth, Logan Ramsey, Vinnette Carroll, Lou Frizzell, John McLiam, Roy Barcroft, Billy Green Bush, Owen Bush, Burgess Meredith, Frank Baker, Beverlee McKinsey, Max Wagner, Lindy Davis, Pat Randall	

== See also ==
- List of 1969 box office number-one films in the United States
- AFI Catalog of Feature Films
- 1969 in the United States
