= Clyde Howdy =

American actor and stuntman

- Born: Clyde Woodard Houdeshell; May 31, 1921; Ohio, U.S.
- Died: October 2, 1969 (aged 48); Los Angeles County, California, U.S.
- Occupations: Actor, stuntman
- Years active: 1955–1969
- Spouse: Kay Howdy
- Children: 3

Clyde Woodard Houdeshell (May 31, 1921 – October 2, 1969) was an American actor and stuntman. He was known for playing the recurring role of assistant park ranger Hank Whitfield in the American children's adventure television series Lassie. He was also known for his appearances in the American western television series Cheyenne and as a double for actor Clint Walker.

== Life and career ==
Howdy was born in Ohio. He served in the United States Navy. He began his career in 1955, first appearing in the western television series The Life and Legend of Wyatt Earp. He then made an appearance to the western television series Annie Oakley. He served as a member of the Freedom Riders since 1960 for which he had earned popularity. He was also a member of the Viewfinders Motorcycle Club.

In 1959, Howdy made his stunt debut in the film The Young Land, which starred Patrick Wayne and Yvonne Craig. In the same year, he served as a stunt for actor Clint Walker in the film Yellowstone Kelly. Howdy appeared in the films such as 4 for Texas, The Shakiest Gun in the West, The Chase, Bonnie and Clyde, PT 109 (as Leon Drawdy), Black Gold, Fort Dobbs and Send Me No Flowers.

Howdy guest-starred in television programs including Gunsmoke, Bonanza, Lawman, Get Smart, Daniel Boone, The Virginian, Maverick, F Troop, The Jack Benny Program, The Big Valley and Death Valley Days. He made numerous appearances in various roles in Cheyenne. Howdy was also a double for actor Clint Walker. He was considered a friend of Walker. His final credit was from the 1970 film There Was a Crooked Man..., which was released after his death.

== Death ==
Howdy died in October 1969 of lung cancer at the Altadena Hospital in Los Angeles County, California, at the age of 48.
