= Lawrence Sherman =

Lawrence Sherman may refer to:

- Lawrence Y. Sherman (1858–1939), Republican politician from the State of Illinois
- Lawrence W. Sherman (born 1949), experimental criminologist

== See also ==
- Larry Sherman, co-founder of Trax Records
- Larry Sherman (actor) (?–2017), American actor
