= Once You Kiss a Stranger =

1969 film by Robert Sparr

- Theatrical release poster
- Directed by: Robert Sparr
- Screenplay by: Frank Tarloff; Norman Katkov
- Based on: Strangers on a Train by Patricia Highsmith
- Produced by: Harold A. Goldstein
- Starring: Paul Burke; Carol Lynley; Martha Hyer; Peter Lind Hayes; Philip Carey; Stephen McNally; Whit Bissell
- Cinematography: Jacques R. Marquette
- Edited by: Marjorie Fowler
- Music by: Jimmie Fagas
- Production company: Warner Bros.-Seven Arts
- Distributed by: Warner Bros.-Seven Arts
- Release date: November 12, 1969
- Running time: 106 minutes
- Country: United States
- Language: English

Once You Kiss a Stranger is a 1969 American thriller film directed by Robert Sparr and written by Norman Katkov and Frank Tarloff. The film stars Paul Burke, Carol Lynley, Martha Hyer, Peter Lind Hayes, Philip Carey, Stephen McNally and Whit Bissell. The film is a loose remake of Strangers on a Train and was released by Warner Bros.-Seven Arts on November 12, 1969.

== Plot ==
Jerry is a professional golfer. When a woman named Diana recognizes how much Jerry hates a rival player, Mike, she offers to commit murder if Jerry will do likewise for her.

The person she wants killed is Dr. Haggis, a psychiatrist who believes Diana to be dangerously disturbed and wants her institutionalized. Jerry doesn't take Diana seriously until she runs down Mike with a golf cart, then beats him to death with one of Jerry's clubs.

Threatening to give the murder weapon to the police, Diana insists that Jerry now get rid of the doctor. He doesn't know what to do, consulting estranged wife Lee while looking for a way out. The longer he delays doing Diana's murder, the angrier she gets, eventually attacking Lee.

== Cast ==
- Paul Burke as Jerry
- Carol Lynley as Diana
- Martha Hyer as Lee
- Peter Lind Hayes as Pete
- Philip Carey as Mike
- Stephen McNally as Lt. Gavin
- Whit Bissell as Dr. Haggis
- Elaine Devry as Sharon
- Kathryn Givney as Aunt Margaret
- Jim Raymond as Johnny Parker
- George Fenneman as Announcer
- Orville Sherman as Raymond
- Maura McGiveney as Harriet Parker
- Ann Doran as Lee's Mother

== See also ==
- List of American films of 1969
- Remakes of films by Alfred Hitchcock
