= More Dead Than Alive =

1969 film by Robert Sparr

- Movie Poster
- Directed by: Robert Sparr
- Written by: George Schenck
- Produced by: Aubrey Schenck; Hal Klein
- Starring: Clint Walker; Vincent Price; Anne Francis; Mike Henry; Beverly Powers; Paul Hampton
- Cinematography: Jack Marquette
- Edited by: John F. Schreyer
- Music by: Philip Springer
- Production company: Aubrey Schenck Productions
- Distributed by: United Artists
- Release date: January 15, 1969
- Running time: 101 min.
- Country: United States
- Language: English

More Dead Than Alive is a 1969 American Western film directed by Robert Sparr and produced by Aubrey Schenck. It was filmed at Agua Dulce, California.

== Plot ==
A killer named Cain is released from prison after 18 years and wants to settle down as a rancher without ever having to touch a gun again. But no one will give him a job and people are after him for his earlier crimes. He finally takes an offer from showman Ruffalo to perform as "Killer Cain" in his traveling shooting show. However, after 18 years without practice, Cain is not as good as he once was with a gun. He tries to find redemption and peace when he falls in love and eventually marries Monica Alton, an artist from the east who came out west to paint. Yet Cain's reputation continues to dog him; Luke Santee tries to settle an old score, while Billy Valence, a young rival sharpshooter (with mental issues) in Ruffalo's show, is looking to build his reputation by killing Cain. Billy, struggling against the comparisons to Cain lower pay and belittling by Ruffalo, snaps and shoots an unarmed Ruffalo and steals the shows profits. Billy rides out to a deserted town and as he admires the stolen money, Santee enters and says he could use the money. Billy invites him to take the money, draws his gun and attempts to fire multiple times having forgotten to reload. Santee draws his gun and shoots Billy who begs for his life with Santee shooting him a second time, killing him.

== Cast ==
Actor	Role
Clint Walker	Cain
Vincent Price	Dan Ruffalo
Anne Francis	Monica Alton
Paul Hampton	Billy
Mike Henry	Luke Santee
William Woodson	Warden
Beverly Powers	Sheree

== Critical reception ==
Reviewer Howard Thompson of The New York Times in 1969 praised the performances of Clint Walker and Anne Francis, but did not care for the movie, saying "More Dead Than Alive is a dogged but dinky little Western with the perfect title." He described Paul Hampton in the role of Billy as an "incredibly poor young actor" and concluded that "the title still fits: 'Dead' western."

== See also ==
- List of American films of 1969
