= Riot (1969 film) =

1969 drama film from the United States directed by Buzz Kulik

- Directed by: Buzz Kulik
- Written by: James Poe
- Based on: novel The Riot by Frank Elli
- Produced by: William Castle
- Starring: Gene Hackman; Jim Brown; Mike Kellin; Gerald S. O'Loughlin; Ben Carruthers; Clifford David; Bill Walker; Jerry Thompson; Ricky Summers; Mr. Gerri; John Neiderhauser; Frank Eyman
- Cinematography: Robert B. Hauser
- Edited by: Edwin H. Bryant
- Music by: Krzysztof Komeda
- Production company: William Castle Productions
- Distributed by: Paramount Pictures
- Release date: January 15, 1969
- Running time: 96 minutes
- Country: United States
- Language: English
- Box office: $1.3 million (US/ Canada rentals)

Riot is a 1969 American drama film produced by William Castle, directed by Buzz Kulik and starring Gene Hackman and Jim Brown.

== Plot ==
While the warden (real-life warden Frank A. Eyman) of a state prison is away, the isolation block erupts and 35 of the most violent criminals stage a riot and take over their portion of the prison. Cully Briston, in for five years and awaiting his eventual parole, wants no part of the riot. He impulsively gets involved, defending a prison guard and protecting him from the maniacs in the block.

== Cast ==
| Actor | Role |
|---|---|
| Jim Brown | Cully Briston |
| Gene Hackman | Red Fraker |
| Mike Kellin | Bugsy |
| Gerald S. O'Loughlin | Grossman |
| Ben Carruthers | Surefoot |
| Clifford David | Mary Sheldon |
| Clair Sullivan | the Doctor |

== Production ==
The film is based on a non-fiction novel by Frank Elli, which chronicled an actual riot that took place in an Arizona prison.

In addition to using real-life warden Frank A. Eyman, the production utilized a number of real-life prisoners as extras.

The film was partially shot at the Yuma Territorial Prison. Alan Rudolph worked on the film as an assistant director. He recalled, "It was quite an experience. The top instructions were to never go anywhere inside the walls without a guard and absolutely no running whatsoever. Real sharpshooters were in the towers and real killers on the ground. By the third week the director and star weren’t speaking. So there I was, low man on the production pole, sprinting unaccompanied across the yard and to retrieve our star from his trailer, where he went after each take just to piss off the director – only in the movies!"

== Release ==
The film was given a theatrical release in the United States by Paramount Pictures in 1969.

The film was given a belated release on VHS by Paramount Home Video in 1993.

The film was sub-licensed to Olive Films by Paramount and released on DVD by in 2010. It was released on Blu-ray in Germany in 2022 by Wicked Vision as Black Cinema Edition #12.

== See also ==
- List of American films of 1969

== Reviews ==
- Prison Movies review
