= Fort Dobbs =

1958 film by Gordon Douglas

- Theatrical release poster
- Directed by: Gordon Douglas
- Screenplay by: George W. George; Burt Kennedy
- Based on: the story "Backtrack" by George W. George; Burt Kennedy
- Produced by: Martin Rackin
- Starring: Clint Walker; Virginia Mayo; Brian Keith
- Cinematography: William H. Clothier
- Edited by: Clarence Kolster
- Music by: Max Steiner
- Production company: Warner Bros. Pictures
- Distributed by: Warner Bros. Pictures
- Release date: April 18, 1958 (United States)
- Running time: 93 minutes
- Country: United States
- Language: English

Fort Dobbs is a 1958 American Western film, the first of three directed by Gordon Douglas to star Clint Walker. The other two were: Yellowstone Kelly in 1959 and Gold of the Seven Saints in 1961.

Released by Warner Bros. Pictures and based on a screenplay by George W. George and Burt Kennedy, the film runs for 93 minutes with black-and-white photography provided by William H. Clothier. It was intended to capitalize on Walker's success in the Cheyenne TV series, but box office returns were modest.

== Plot ==
Gar Davis has to get out of Largo in a hurry because a man he threatened to kill has been found dead. He comes across a man in Comanche territory killed by an arrow. Gar trades jackets with the dead man and then shoves the corpse over a cliff, hoping the posse pursuing him will think he's the one who is dead.

Trying to steal a horse, Gar's face is grazed by a bullet shot by young Chad Grey, whose mother Celia tends to the stranger's wound. Indians attack the house. Gar helps fend them off, after which he and the Greys take off on horseback toward the safety of Fort Dobbs.

On the trail, an outlaw called Clett kills a Comanche who's about to bushwhack Gar, saving his life. Gar doesn't trust him, though, because Clett is carrying rifles that he could be selling to the Indians rather than to buyers in Santa Fe.

Clett tries to take advantage of Celia, but even though Gar comes to her aid, Celia no longer trusts him because she's found the jacket Gar stole. It belonged to her husband, so Celia is now convinced that Gar murdered him, making her a widow.

Gar successfully escorts Celia and Chad to the fort and then rides away so he won't be arrested. Celia and Chad enter the fort, but all of the soldiers are dead. Gar turns around when he hears Comanche war cries and helps the citizens of Largo who are fleeing toward the fort for protection. A sheriff appreciates Gar's help fighting the Indians, but lets him know he must place Gar under arrest. Gar claims he killed the Largo man in self-defense after an argument. Permitted to ride to Santa Fe to get help, Gar ends up killing Clett for the rifles, bringing them back to save the fort and to win the widow's trust.

== Cast ==
- Clint Walker as Gar Davis
- Virginia Mayo as Celia Grey
- Brian Keith as Clett
- Richard Eyer as Chad Grey
- Russ Conway as the Sheriff
- Michael Dante as Billings

== Production ==
Parts of the film were shot in Duck Creek, Aspen Mirror Lake, Paria, Kanab Canyon, Cave Lakes Canyon, Kanab movie fort, Colorado River, Mat Martin Wash, and Professor Valley in Utah.

== Reception ==
=== Critical response ===
Howard Thompson of The New York Times gave the film a mixed review, writing, "As for the plot, written by Burt Kennedy and George W. George, Mr. Walker plays a murder fugitive who rescues a widow and her small son from some Comanches and finally clears his name by leading a stockade defense against a mass attack. For the first two-thirds of this Martin Rackin production almost nothing happens, as the hero, Miss Mayo and young Richard Eyer drag across the prairie. The picture drags right along with it. Gordon Douglas, its director, has given the climax a neat turn or two. And toward the end, a couple of nice sideline performances click into place—namely, Brian Keith, as a renegade, and Russ Conway, as a sheriff. Miss Mayo also perks up considerably at the homestretch, minus her initial Southern accent. What happened, honey chile?"

== See also ==
- List of American films of 1958
