= Kuklík =

- Municipality
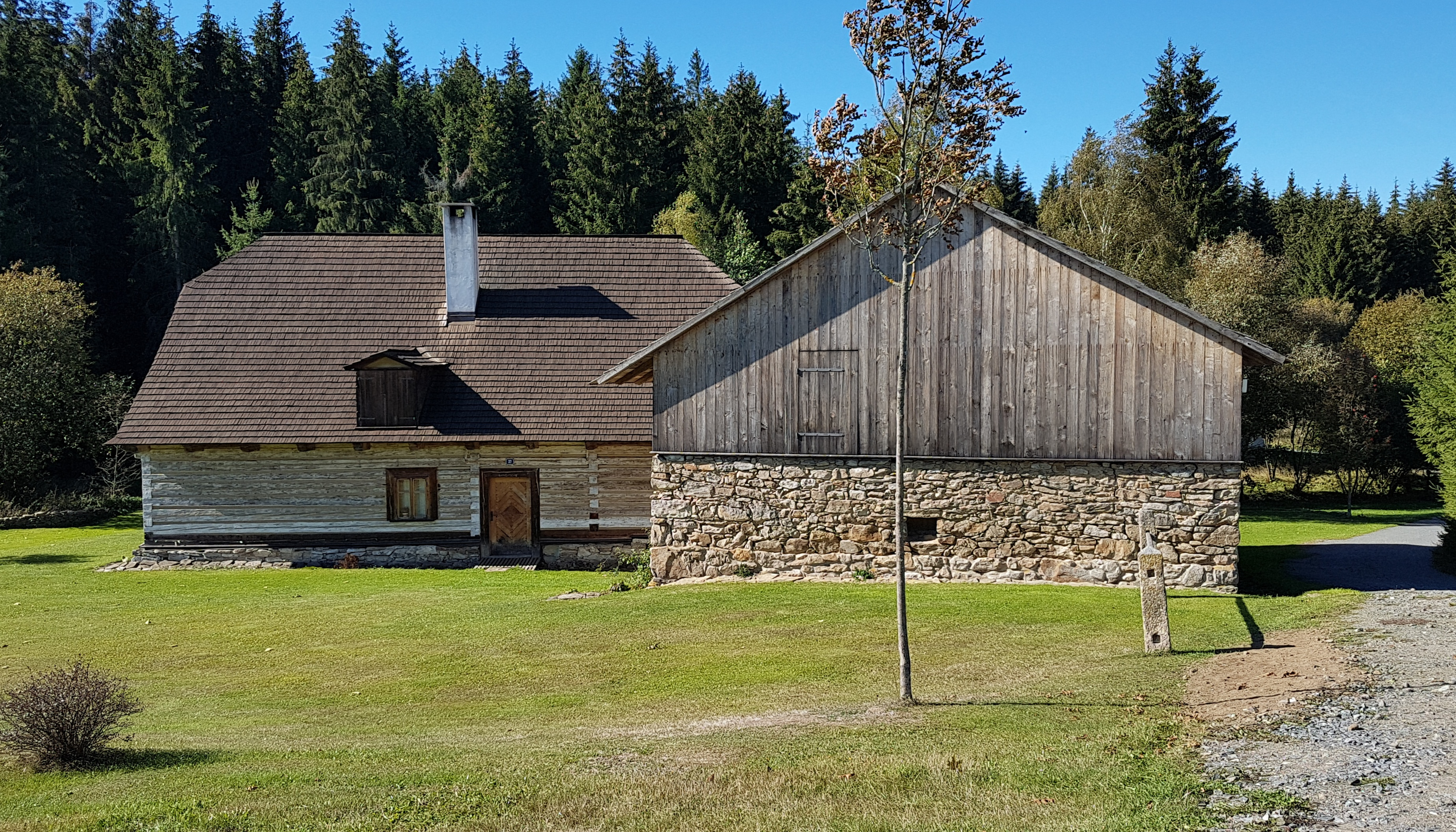
- House No. 37, a cultural monument

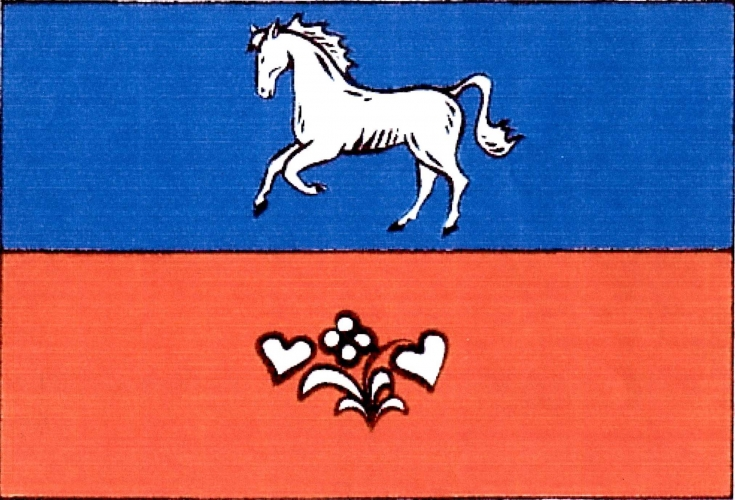
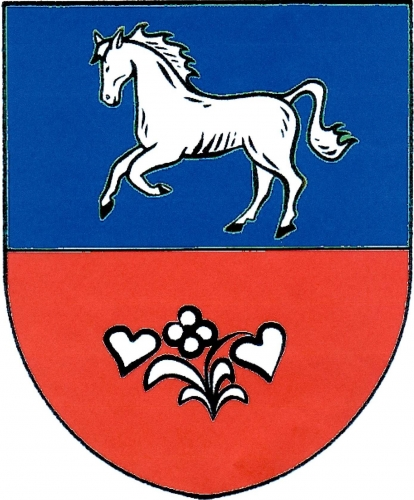
- Flag Coat of arms

- Location in the Czech Republic
- Coordinates: 49°37′48″N 16°6′47″E
- Country: Czech Republic
- Region: Vysočina
- District: Žďár nad Sázavou
- First mentioned: 1534

Area
  - Total: 7.86 km^{2} (3.03 sq mi)
- Elevation: 640 m (2,100 ft)

Population (2026-01-01)
  - Total: 196
  - Density: 24.9/km^{2} (64.6/sq mi)
- Time zone: UTC+1 (CET)
  - Summer (DST): UTC+2 (CEST)
- Postal code: 592 03
- Website: www.obeckuklik.cz

Kuklík is a municipality and village in Žďár nad Sázavou District in the Vysočina Region of the Czech Republic. It has about 200 inhabitants.

Kuklík lies approximately 15 kilometres (9 mi) north-east of Žďár nad Sázavou, 46 km (29 mi) north-east of Jihlava, and 132 km (82 mi) south-east of Prague.

== Demographics ==
Historical population
Year	Pop.	±%
1869	586	—
1880	560	−4.4%
1890	596	+6.4%
1900	532	−10.7%
1910	474	−10.9%
1921	414	−12.7%
1930	442	+6.8%
1950	270	−38.9%
1961	251	−7.0%
1970	222	−11.6%
1980	205	−7.7%
1991	180	−12.2%
2001	173	−3.9%
2011	165	−4.6%
2021	191	+15.8%
Source: Censuses
