= Clint Walker =

American actor (1927–2018)

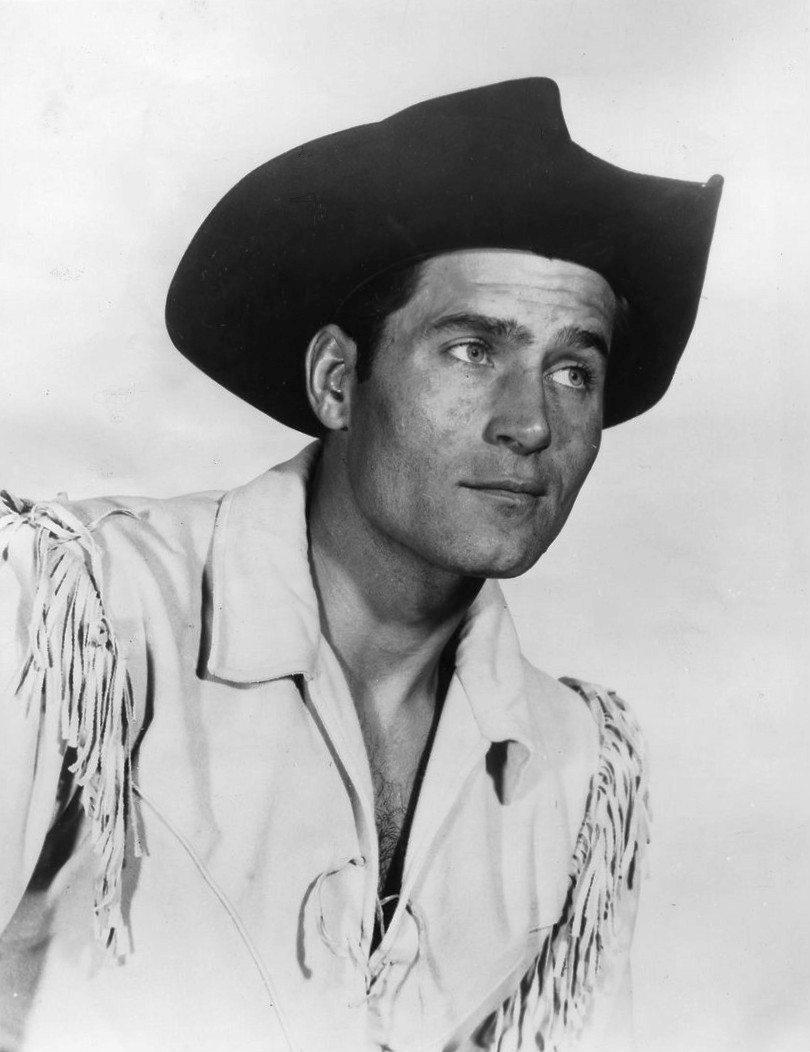
- Walker in 1960
- Born: Norman Eugene Walker; May 30, 1927; Hartford, Illinois, U.S.
- Died: May 21, 2018 (aged 90); Grass Valley, California, U.S.
- Other name: Jett Norman
- Occupation: Actor
- Years active: 1954–1998
- Spouses: Verna Garver (m. 1948; div. 1968) Giselle Hennesy (m. 1974; died 1994) Susan Cavallari (m. 1997)
- Children: Valerie Walker

Norman Eugene "Clint" Walker (May 30, 1927 – May 21, 2018) was an American actor. He rose to stardom for playing the title character in the Western series Cheyenne (1955–1962).

Walker launched his Hollywood career by appearing in Cecil B. DeMille's epic The Ten Commandments (1956). He starred in numerous Western films, including Fort Dobbs (1958), Yellowstone Kelly (1959), Gold of the Seven Saints (1961), The Night of the Grizzly (1966), More Dead Than Alive (1969), Sam Whiskey (1969), and Pancho Villa (1972). He also explored other genres, taking on a comedic role in Send Me No Flowers (1964), and starring in war films such as Frank Sinatra's None but the Brave (1965) and Robert Aldrich's The Dirty Dozen (1967). His final film role was a voice part in Small Soldiers (1998).

In addition to his acting career, Walker ventured into music, first showcasing his singing in a 1957 episode of Cheyenne. He later released an album titled Inspiration in 1959, performed on The Jack Benny Program in 1963, and sang in The Night of the Grizzly (1966).

== Early life ==
Clint Walker was born in Hartford, Illinois. His mother, Gladys Henrietta née Schwanda, was born in Uljanik, Croatia-Slavonia, Austria-Hungary (today Croatia) to a Moravian Evangelical couple from Kuklík and Sebranice. His father, Paul Arnold Walker, worked as a laborer for Shell Oil. He had a fraternal twin sister, Neoma Lucille "Lucy" Westbrook and another half-sister. Their parents separated. Walker left school to work at a factory and on a riverboat, then joined the United States Merchant Marine at the age of 17.

After leaving the Merchant Marine, he did odd jobs in Brownwood, Texas; Long Beach, California; and Las Vegas, Nevada, where he worked as a doorman at the Sands Hotel before reuniting with the Merchant Marine during the Korean War.

== Career ==
=== Early films ===
Walker became a client of Henry Willson, who renamed him "Jett Norman".

=== Cheyenne ===
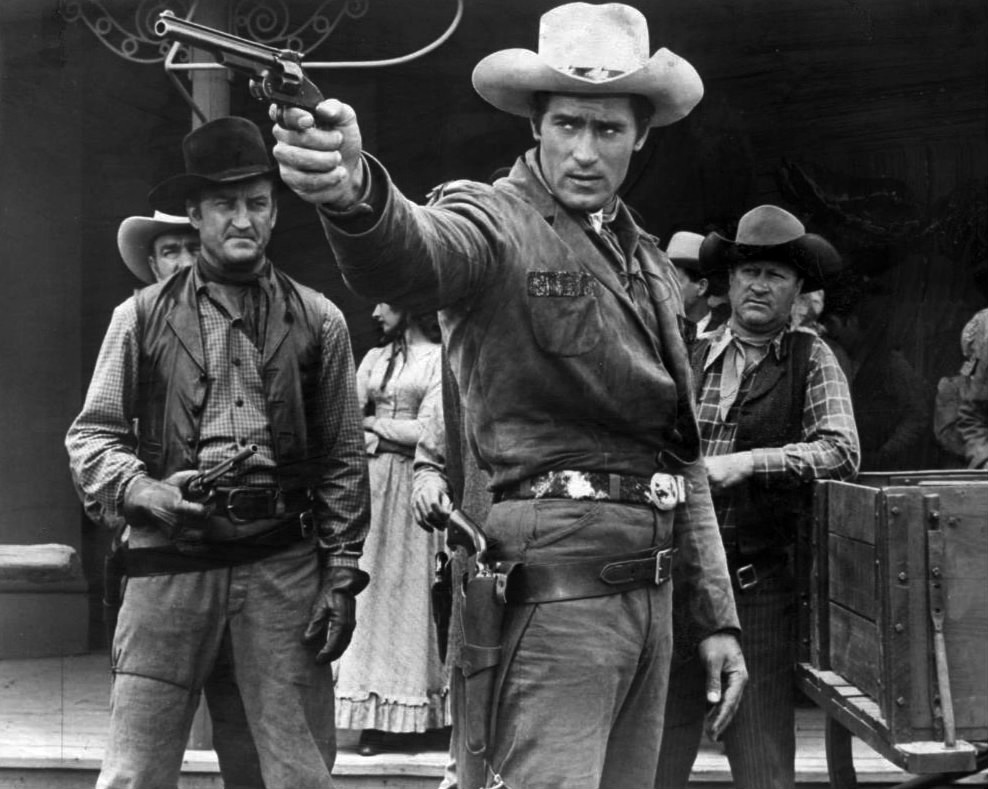
Walker as Cheyenne Bodie in 1956

Walker's good looks and imposing physique (he stood 6 ft 6 in (1.98 m) tall with a 48 in (120 cm) chest and a 32 in (81 cm) waist) helped him land an audition where he won the lead role in the TV series Cheyenne.

Billed as "Clint Walker", he was cast as Cheyenne Bodie, a roaming cowboy hero in the post-American Civil War era. His casting was announced in June 1955.

Cheyenne originally appeared as part of Warner Bros. Presents rotating with adaptations of Kings Row and Casablanca. Cheyenne turned out to be the breakout hit.

The series regularly capitalized on Walker's rugged frame with frequent bare-chested scenes, and was popular for seven seasons. Walker's pleasant baritone singing voice was also occasionally utilized on the series and led Warner Brothers to produce an album of Walker performing traditional songs and ballads.

Early in the series run, Warners announced they would star Walker in a feature, The Story of Sam Houston. It was not made.

In April 1956 Walker said "I don't think I'd want any other roles ... Westerns keep me outdoors and active."

Warners cast Walker in the lead of a Western feature film, Fort Dobbs (1958), directed by Gordon Douglas. Howard Thompson described the actor as "the biggest, finest-looking Western hero ever to sag a horse, with a pair of shoulders rivaling King Kong's".

Box office returns were modest. Warners tried him in another Douglas-directed Western, Yellowstone Kelly (1959), co-starring Edd Byrnes from another Warners TV show, 77 Sunset Strip. It was a minor success.

A number of Cheyenne episodes were cut into feature films and released theatrically in some markets, and a brief clip of Walker galloping on horseback as Bodie was featured in an episode of Maverick starring Jack Kelly. He also guest starred on an episode of 77 Sunset Strip. Warners tried Walker in a third Western feature directed by Douglas, Gold of the Seven Saints (1961), this time co-starring Roger Moore, who was also under contract to Warners.

=== Post-Cheyenne ===
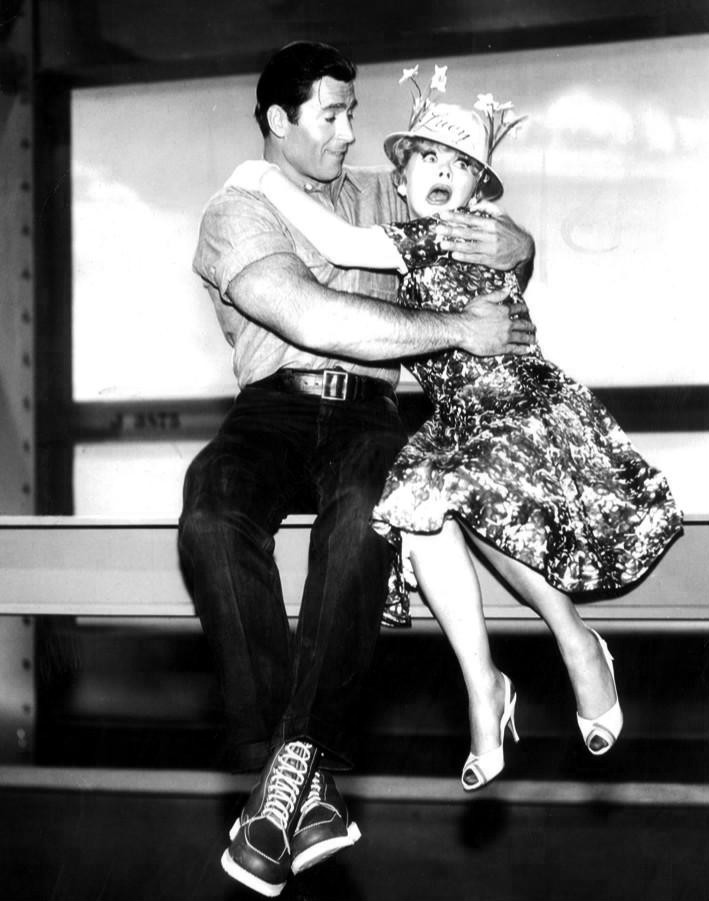
Walker on The Lucy Show

Walker had a role in Kraft Suspense Theatre (episode "Portrait of an Unknown Man", alongside Robert Duvall). He had a supporting role in the Rock Hudson–Doris Day comedy, Send Me No Flowers (1964).

Frank Sinatra cast him in the leading role in the war drama None but the Brave (1965), the only film Sinatra directed. After doing some guest appearances in The Lucy Show he fought a grizzly bear in Paramount's Western, The Night of the Grizzly (1966). He starred in a family adventure movie shot in India, Maya (1966).

Walker had his biggest feature film hit to date when he played the meek convict Samson Posey in the war drama The Dirty Dozen (1967).

Walker returned to Westerns with More Dead Than Alive (1969). The New York Times described the actor as "a big, fine-looking chap and about as live-looking as any man could be. And there is something winning about his taciturn earnestness as an actor, although real emotion seldom breaks through".

Walker had support roles in two comic Westerns, Sam Whiskey (1969) and The Great Bank Robbery (1969).

=== 1970s ===
Walker was one of many names in The Phynx (1970) and returned to TV with the leads in some television pilots that appeared as made for television movies on the ABC Movie of the Week, Yuma (1971), Hardcase (1972), and The Bounty Man (1972). In May 1971, he was seriously injured in a skiing accident on Mammoth Mountain when one of his ski poles went through his chest but he recovered.

Walker supported Telly Savalas in the biopic Pancho Villa (1972) and starred in a short-lived series in 1974 called Kodiak, playing an Alaska State Trooper. He starred in the made-for-television cult film Killdozer! the same year as well as Scream of the Wolf (1974).

Walker starred in Baker's Hawk (1976) and had supporting roles in Snowbeast (1977), and The White Buffalo (1977). He starred in the Canadian Deadly Harvest (1977) and had a small role in Centennial and Mysterious Island of Beautiful Women (1979).

== Literary pursuits ==
Walker met western author Kirby Jonas through James Drury, a mutual friend. Jonas and Walker subsequently spent two years collaborating on a storyline by Walker involving gold and the Yaqui. The partnership led to the publication of the 2003 Western novel Yaqui Gold (ISBN 978-1-891423-08-6).

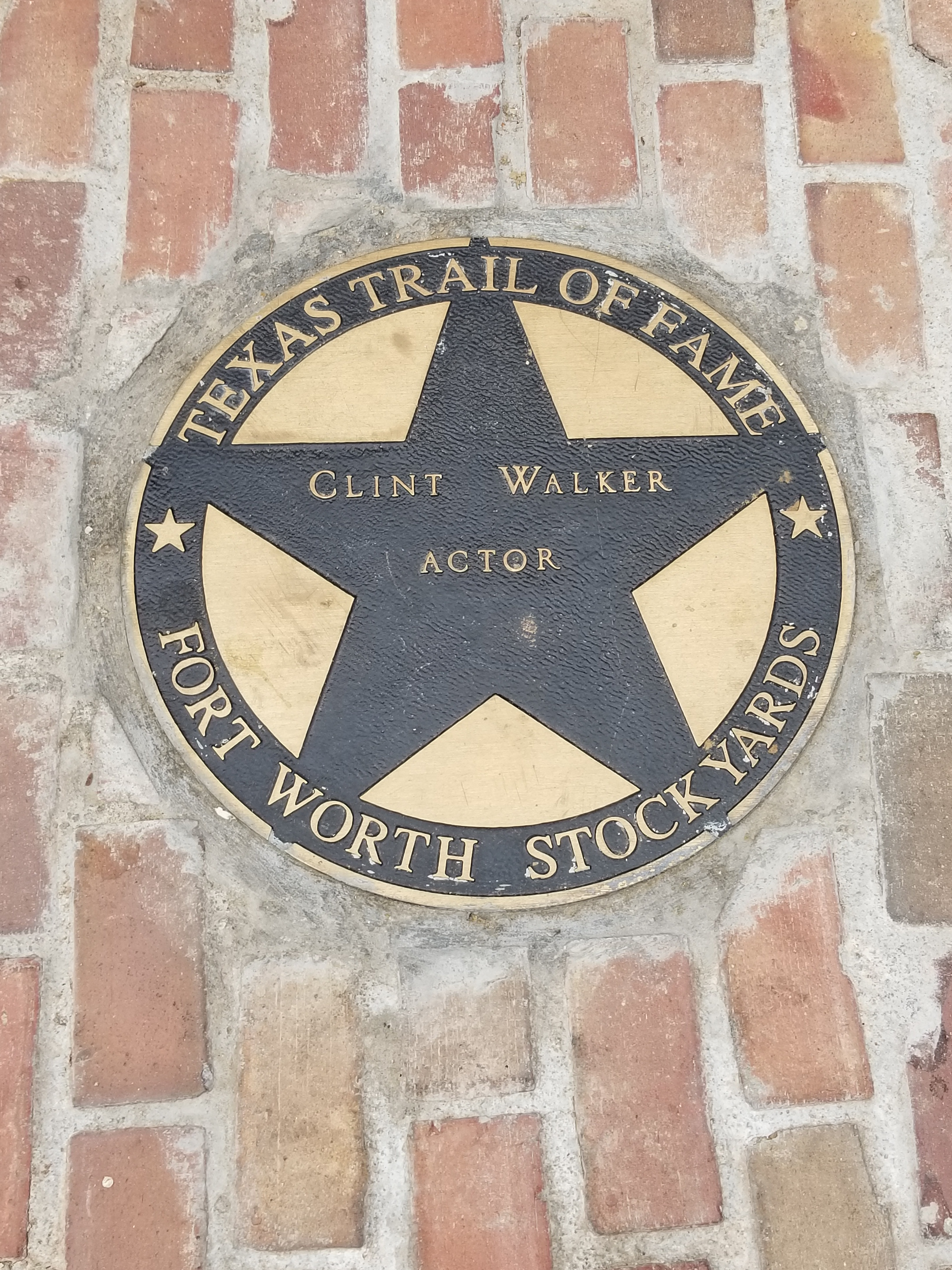
Clint Walker Star on Texas Trail of Fame

== Honors ==
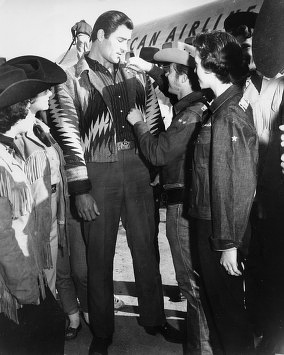
Walker being pinned with a Sheriff's Badge at Frontier Fiesta at the University of Houston (circa 1950s)

Walker has a star on the Hollywood Walk of Fame at 1505 Vine Street, near its intersection with Sunset Boulevard (approximate coordinates: 34.098084°N 118.326643°W).

In 2004, he was inducted into the Hall of Great Western Performers at the National Cowboy & Western Heritage Museum in Oklahoma City, Oklahoma.

He received the Golden Boot Award in 1997.

In 2017, he was presented an inlaid bronze star medallion on the Texas Trail of Fame in the Fort Worth Stockyards National Historic District.

== Personal life and death ==
Walker had three marriages, each of which lasted approximately twenty years. Walker married Verna Garver in 1948. The marriage produced one daughter, Valerie (born 1950) before ending in divorce in 1968. Valerie became one of the first female airline pilots. Walker then married Giselle Hennesy in 1974 and they remained married until her death in 1994. His final marriage was to Susan Cavallari, which lasted from 1997 until his death.

Walker was a pesce-pollotarian, stating, "we don't eat beef, but we eat chicken and salmon."

Walker supported Barry Goldwater in the 1964 United States presidential election.

In May of 1971, Walker narrowly escaped death in a skiing accident at Mammoth Mountain, California. While following the contours of the twisting, irregular terrain, Walker began tumbling out of control before coming to an abrupt, violent stop in which he was pierced through the heart with a ski pole. He was taken to a hospital and pronounced dead by two doctors. During his time being clinically dead, he stated that he had a near-death experience, in which he experienced being in a "spirit body" state, feeling "more alive, more alert, more aware, suddenly know things you never knew before...no aches and pains", and that he "wasn't all that concerned with going back" [to life]. However, a third doctor passing by checked on Walker, resuscitated him and rushed him to surgery, where his damaged heart was repaired. Within two months, Walker was working again.

Walker died of congestive heart failure in Grass Valley, California, on May 21, 2018, shortly before his 91st birthday. He was survived by his daughter, his third wife, as well as his half sister and grandson. His twin sister, Lucille Westbrook, died in 2000.

== Filmography ==
- 1954: Jungle Gents as Tarzan Type (uncredited)
- 1955–1962: Cheyenne (TV series) as Cheyenne Bodie / Ace Black / Jim Thornton Merritt
- 1956: The Ten Commandments as Sardinian Captain
- 1957: The Travellers as Cheyenne Bodie
- 1958: Fort Dobbs as Gar Davis
- 1959: Yellowstone Kelly as Luther 'Yellowstone' Kelly
- 1960: Requiem to Massacre as Cheyenne Bodie
- 1961: Gold of the Seven Saints as Jim Rainbolt
- 1963: The Jack Benny Program
- 1964: Send Me No Flowers as Bert Power
- 1965: None but the Brave as Capt. Dennis Bourke
- 1965–1966: The Lucy Show (TV series, 2 episodes) as Frank / Frank Wilson
- 1966: The Night of the Grizzly as Jim Cole
- 1966: Maya as Hugh Bowen
- 1967: The Dirty Dozen as Samson Posey
- 1969: More Dead Than Alive as Cain
- 1969: Sam Whiskey as O. W. Bandy
- 1969: The Great Bank Robbery as Ranger Ben Quick
- 1970: The Phynx as Cheyenne
- 1971: Yuma (TV movie) as Marshal Dave Harmon
- 1972: Hardcase (TV movie) as Jack Rutherford
- 1972: The Bounty Man (TV movie) as Kinkaid
- 1972: Pancho Villa as Scotty
- 1974: Kodiak (13 episodes) as Cal "Kodiak" McKay
- 1974: Scream of the Wolf (TV movie) as Byron Douglas
- 1974: Killdozer! (TV movie) as Lloyd Kelly
- 1976: Baker's Hawk as Dan Baker
- 1977: The White Buffalo as Whistling Jack Kileen
- 1977: Snowbeast (TV movie) as Sheriff Paraday
- 1977: Deadly Harvest as Grant Franklin
- 1978: Centennial (TV mini-series) as Joe Bean
- 1979: Mysterious Island of Beautiful Women (TV movie) as Wendell
- 1983: Hysterical as Sheriff
- 1983: The Love Boat (Episode: "Friend of the Family/Affair on Demand/Just Another Pretty Face") as Bill
- 1985: The Serpent Warriors as Morgan Bates
- 1985: The All American Cowboy (TV movie)
- 1991: The Gambler Returns: The Luck of the Draw (TV movie) as Cheyenne Bodie
- 1993: Tropical Heat (TV) – episode "The Last of the Magnificent"
- 1994: Maverick as Sheriff (cameo appearance) (Scene deleted)
- 1995: Kung Fu: The Legend Continues (TV) as Cheyenne Bodie, episode "Gunfighters"
- 1998: Small Soldiers as Nick Nitro (Voice) (final film role)
