= H.W. Gim =

Chinese-American character actor (1908–1973)

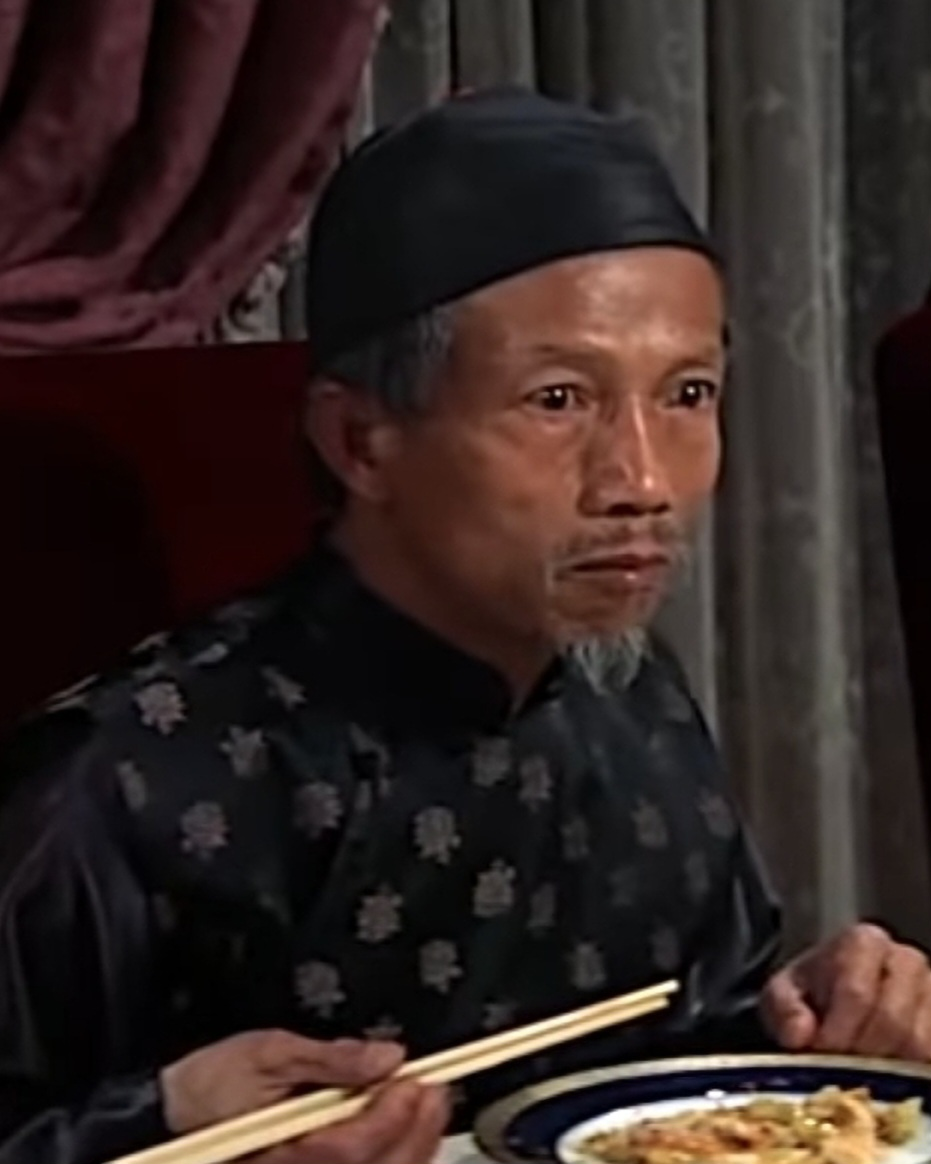
- H.W. Gim in McLintock! (1963)
- Born: Hom Wing Gim; January 22, 1908; China
- Died: March 15, 1973 (aged 65); Los Angeles, California, U.S.
- Occupation: Actor
- Years active: 1938–1972

Hom Wing Gim (January 22, 1908 – March 15, 1973), known professionally as H.W. Gim, was a Chinese film and television character actor who had a career from 1937 to 1972. While most of his parts were smaller, often-uncredited roles, Gim was occasionally given a more substantial supporting roles such as in many John Wayne films such as In Old California (1942) and McLintock! (1963).

== Biography ==
Gim was born in January 1908 in China as Hom Wing Gim. His acting debut was in the 1937 film The Good Earth. Noted as one of the busiest character actors in Hollywood, he was known as "Peanuts" to casting directors. By 1965, his 30th year acting, the five-foot actor had been in 159 films.

Gim died on March 15, 1973, in Los Angeles, California.

== Filmography ==
=== Film ===
Year	Title	Role	Notes
1937	The Good Earth		
1938	Mr. Moto Takes a Chance	Rajah Ali Retainer	Uncredited
1942	In Old California	Townsman	Uncredited
1945	Back to Bataan	Japanese Secret Agent	Uncredited
1947	Her Husband's Affairs	Acrobat	Uncredited
1950	The Breaking Point	Chinese Immigrant	Uncredited
1951	Peking Express	Chinese Mess Boy	Uncredited
1951	Never Trust a Gambler	Chinese Restaurant Waiter	Uncredited
1952	Okinawa	Japanese Submariner	Uncredited
1952	Macao	Sampan Pilot	Uncredited
1957	Battle Hymn	Minor Role	Uncredited
1957	The Joker Is Wild	Janitor	Uncredited
1958	Hong Kong Confidential	Man Celebrating New Year	Uncredited
1960	Heller in Pink Tights	Bartender	Uncredited
1960	Ice Palace	Asian Worker	Uncredited
1961	Flower Drum Song	Citizen	Uncredited
1962	The Chapman Report	Gardner	Uncredited
1962	Gypsy	Waiter	Uncredited
1963	Donovan's Reef	Chinese Man	Uncredited
1963	McLintock!	Ching	Uncredited
1965	Fluffy	Assistant Cook	Uncredited
1966	7 Women	Culi	
1969	True Grit	Chen Lee	
1969	Paint Your Wagon	Wong	

=== Television ===
Year	Title	Role	Notes
1954	The Lone Wolf	Citizen	Episode: "The Chinese Story", Uncredited
1957	The Silent Service	2nd Guerrilla	Episode: "The Gar Story"
1959	Peter Gunn	Waiter	Episode: "Lady Windbell's Fan ", Uncredited
1959	Laramie	Fight Spectator	Episode: "Bare Knuckles", Uncredited
1960–1961	Bachelor Father	Gregory / Cousin Gregory / Harry	5 episodes
1965	Rawhide	Townsman	Episode: "The Book", Uncredited
1965	I Spy	Busboy #1	Episode: "Danny Was a Million Laughs"
1965	The Man from U.N.C.L.E.	Representative	Episode: "The Cherry Blossom Affair", Uncredited
1966	Scalplock	Workman	TV movie, Uncredited pilot for Iron Horse
1968	It Takes a Thief	Commuter at Airport	Episode: "When Thieves Fall In", Uncredited
1972	The Odd Couple	Cho San	Episode: "Partner's Investment", (final appearance)
