= Robert Sparr =

American film director

- Born: Robert Tyrone Sparr; September 15, 1915; Wilkes-Barre, Pennsylvania, U.S.
- Died: August 28, 1969 (aged 53); Colorado, U.S.
- Occupations: Television director, film director, editor
- Years active: 1952—1969

Robert Sparr (September 10, 1915 – August 28, 1969) was an American screenwriter, television director, and film director. He died as a result of a plane crash in Colorado while scouting filming locations for the 1970 film Barquero with fellow Star Trek crew member, cameraman Gerald Finnerman. The pilot was also killed but Finnerman survived. The plane crash prompted a drawn-out legal battle involving Sparr's son for a wrongful death suit, which went to the United States Court of Appeals, Tenth Circuit.

== Selected filmography as a director ==
- The Alaskans (1959)
- Lawman (1959–1960)
- Hawaiian Eye (1961)
- The Roaring 20's (1961)
- Bonanza (1961)
- Bronco (1960–1962)
- Surfside 6 (1962)
- Cheyenne (1960–1962)
- The Gallant Men (1963)
- 77 Sunset Strip (1961–1963)
- A Swingin' Summer (1965)
- Perry Mason
- Star Trek (1966)
- The Wild Wild West (1966–1967)
- Batman (1967)
- The High Chaparral (1967)
- The Rat Patrol (1967)
- Voyage to the Bottom of the Sea (1967–1968)
- Lassie (1967–1968)
- More Dead Than Alive (1968)
- The Outcasts (1969)
- Once You Kiss a Stranger (1969)
