= Frank Eyman =

- Born: 1898; Illinois, United States
- Died: 1984 (aged 85–86); Phoenix, Arizona
- Occupation: Prison warden
- Employer: Arizona State Prison Complex – Florence
- Known for: Involvement in the capture of John Dillinger, starring in 2 films
- Military career
- Branch: United States Army; United States Navy
- Units: 5th Cavalry Regiment; Office of Naval Intelligence
- Conflicts: World War I World War II

Sheriff of Pima County, Arizona
- In office 1951–1955
- Preceded by: Jerome P. Martin
- Succeeded by: Benjamin Julius McKinney

Frank A. Eyman (1898–1984) was a U.S. prison warden, who appeared in a couple of movies as a prison warden. One of them was the 1969 film Riot that starred Jim Brown and Gene Hackman. He was also one of the policemen that captured John Dillinger.

== Career ==
He was born in Illinois. In World War I he served in the 5th Cavalry, on horseback. Before he was a prison warden, he was a policeman. In 1921, he began his career in law in Joliet, Illinois. He then moved to Tucson, Arizona and in 1926 joined its police department, eventually becoming captain. During World War II, he resigned to join the U.S. Navy Intelligence. After the war, he briefly worked for the Federal Bureau of Prisons and later returned to Tucson. In 1950, he successfully ran for Pima County Sheriff. At the beginning of his third term as County sheriff in 1955, he was appointed as superintendent of the prison by Governor Ernest McFarland. From 1955 to 1972, he was the warden of Arizona State Prison in Florence, Arizona.

When he retired in 1972 at the age of 74, he said that he'd never rehabilitated anyone in his life. Rather he re-educated and trained them. That was his philosophy.

He retired in Casa Grande and died in Phoenix in 1984.

== Film ==
He appeared in two feature films. The first, in 1957 was The Way to the Gold, directed by Robert D. Webb, starring Jeffrey Hunter and Sheree North. In that film he played himself. The other film was Riot in 1969, directed by Buzz Kulik. In that film he played The Warden.
