= Paint Your Wagon (film) =

1969 film by Joshua Logan

- Original film poster by Ron Lesser
- Directed by: Joshua Logan
- Screenplay by: Alan Jay Lerner; Paddy Chayefsky (adaptation)
- Based on: Paint Your Wagon (1951 musical) by Lerner and Loewe
- Produced by: Alan Jay Lerner
- Starring: Lee Marvin; Clint Eastwood; Jean Seberg; Ray Walston; Harve Presnell
- Cinematography: William A. Fraker
- Edited by: Robert C. Jones
- Music by: Frederick Loewe; André Previn; Nelson Riddle (adaptation)
- Production companies: Alan Jay Lerner Productions; The Malpaso Company
- Distributed by: Paramount Pictures
- Release date: October 15, 1969
- Running time: 154 minutes
- Country: United States
- Language: English
- Budget: $20 million
- Box office: $31.6 million

Paint Your Wagon is a 1969 American Western musical film directed by Joshua Logan, adapted by Paddy Chayefsky and screenplay by producer Alan Jay Lerner from the 1951 Lerner and Loewe stage musical. It stars Lee Marvin, Clint Eastwood, Jean Seberg, Ray Walston and Harve Presnell. The plot centers on a love triangle in a mining camp in Gold Rush-era California.

The film was released on October 15, 1969, in the United States by Paramount Pictures. It received mixed-to-negative reviews and was a commercial disappointment, though it earned an Academy Award nomination for Best Music, Score of a Musical Picture (Original or Adaptation). This was the last film directed by Logan, who died in 1988.

== Plot ==
When a wagon crashes into a ravine, prospector Ben Rumson finds two adult occupants, brothers, one of whom is dead and the other of whom has a broken arm and leg. During the dead man's burial, gold dust is discovered at the grave site. Ben stakes a claim on the land and adopts the surviving brother as his "Pardner" while he recuperates.

Pardner hopes to make enough in the gold rush to buy some land and is suspicious of the fast-living Ben. Ben claims that while he is willing to fight, steal, and cheat at cards, he will never betray a partner. Ben will share the spoils of prospecting on the condition that Pardner take care of him in his moments of drunkenness and melancholy.

After the discovery of gold, "No Name City" springs up as a tent city, with the miners alternating between wild parties and bouts of loneliness. The men become frustrated with the lack of female companionship, and the arrival of Jacob Woodling, a Mormon with two wives, is enough to catch everyone's attention. The miners persuade Woodling to sell one of his wives to the highest bidder. Elizabeth, Jacob's younger wife, agrees to be sold, as she is unsatisfied with her current husband.

Still drunk, Ben winds up with the highest bid for Elizabeth. After being readied for the wedding by the other miners, he is married to Elizabeth under "mining law", with Ben being granted exclusive rights to her. Elizabeth, not content to be seen as property, threatens to shoot Ben on their wedding night if she is not treated with respect. Despite believing Ben is not the type to settle down, she views their arrangement as acceptable if he will build a cabin to provide her with some security for when he inevitably leaves. Ben, impressed by her determination, enlists the miners to help him keep this promise, and Elizabeth rejoices in having a proper home.

News comes of the pending arrival of "six French tarts" to a neighboring town via stagecoach. A plan is hatched to divert the stagecoach under false pretenses and bring the women to "No Name City", thus providing the other miners with female companionship. Ben heads up the mission and leaves Elizabeth in the care of Pardner. The two fall in love. Elizabeth, also still loving Ben, convinces them that "if a Mormon man can have two wives, why can't a woman have two husbands?" The polyandrous arrangement works until the town becomes large enough that civilized people begin to settle there. A parson begins to make a determined effort to persuade the townsfolk to give up their evil ways. Meanwhile, Ben and a group of miners discover that gold dust is dropping through the floor boards of many saloons. They tunnel under all the businesses to get the gold.

A group of new settlers is rescued from the snow, and the strait-laced family is invited to spend the winter with Elizabeth and Pardner, who is assumed to be her only husband. Ben is left to fend for himself. In revenge, he introduces one of the family, the naive Horton Fenty, to the pleasures of a local saloon and brothel. This leads to Elizabeth dismissing both Ben and Pardner from the log cabin, and Pardner takes to gambling. During a bull-and-bear fight, the rampaging bull falls into the tunnel complex dug by Ben and the others and knocks out all of the support beams, causing the streets and buildings to collapse. Eventually, the town is destroyed entirely. Ben departs for other gold fields. Before this, Pardner reveals his real name to Ben: Sylvester Newel. Elizabeth and Pardner reconcile and plan to stay.

== Cast ==
- Lee Marvin as Ben Rumson
- Clint Eastwood as Sylvester Newel/"Pardner"
- Jean Seberg as Elizabeth
- Harve Presnell as Rotten Luck Willie
- Ray Walston as "Mad Jack" Duncan
- Tom Ligon as Horton Fenty
- Alan Dexter as The Parson
- William O'Connell as Horace Tabor
- Ben Baker as Haywood Holbrook
- Alan Baxter as Mr. Fenty
- Paula Trueman as Mrs. Fenty
- Robert Easton as Atwell
- Geoffrey Norman as Foster
- H.B. Haggerty as Steve Bull
- Terry Jenkins as Joe Mooney
- Karl Bruck as Schermerhorn
- John Mitchum as Jacob Woodling
- Sue Casey as Sarah Woodling
- Eddie Little Sky as Indian
- Harvey Parry as Higgins
- H.W. Gim as Wong
- William Mims as Frock-coated man
- Roy Jenson as Hennessey
- Pat Hawley as Clendennon

== Musical numbers ==
All songs written by Alan Jay Lerner and Frederick Loewe, unless otherwise noted.

1. "I'm on My Way" – Chorus
2. "I Still See Elisa" – Pardner
3. "The First Thing You Know" (Lerner/André Previn) – Ben
4. "Hand Me Down That Can o' Beans" – Chorus, including the Nitty Gritty Dirt Band
5. "They Call the Wind Maria" – Rotten Luck Willie and Chorus
6. "Whoop-Ti-Ay!" – Chorus
7. "A Million Miles Away Behind the Door" (Lerner/Previn) – Elizabeth
8. "I Talk to the Trees" – Pardner
9. "There's a Coach Comin' In" – Rotten Luck Willie and Chorus
10. "The Gospel of No Name City" (Lerner/Previn) – Parson
11. "Best Things" (Lerner/Previn) – Ben, Mad Jack, and Pardner
12. "Wand'rin' Star" – Ben and Chorus
13. "Gold Fever" (Lerner/Previn) – Pardner and Chorus
14. "Finale (I'm on My Way)" – Ben, Mad Jack, and Chorus

=== Charts ===
Chart (1970)	Position
Australia (Kent Music Report)	6

== Production ==
=== Development ===
Multiple attempts were made to adapt Alan Jay Lerner's Paint Your Wagon into a film. Warner Bros. considered making the film with Doris Day and Paramount Pictures considered making it with Bing Crosby. Louis B. Mayer purchased the film rights before his death in 1957, and Paramount bought the rights from his estate.

Lerner, who wrote the screenplays for An American in Paris (1951), Gigi (1958), and My Fair Lady (1964), produced the film. Lerner selected Joshua Logan, who previously directed the film adaption of Lerner's Camelot (1967), to direct Paint Your Wagon. Blake Edwards had wanted to direct the film, but Lerner declined his offer and Edwards instead directed Darling Lili (1970). The plot was significantly changed from the stage play. Lerner attempted to have Frederick Loewe compose the film's soundtrack, but he declined and instead suggested André Previn.

Logan did not like the plot of the original stage play as he found it boring. Lerner agreed with Logan and hired Paddy Chayefsky to make changes to the script. However, Logan felt that Chayefsky's was too detailed and difficult to understand.

Clint Eastwood was selected instead of George Maharis. Lee Marvin accepted the lead role instead of appearing in The Wild Bunch (1969). He received $1 million, while Eastwood was paid $750,000. Faye Dunaway, Mia Farrow, and Tuesday Weld turned down the role of Elizabeth before Jean Seberg was cast. Julie Andrews, Sally Ann Howes, and Diana Rigg were also considered for the role. Lesley Ann Warren, who was under contract to Paramount, had to bow out after she became pregnant.

=== Filming ===
Logan suggested filming all of the interiors on a backlot in Hollywood but was overruled by John Truscott, the film's production designer, and Lerner who insisted that it be shot on location and that a whole town be built in Oregon.

Eastwood and Marvin did their own singing, while Seberg's songs were dubbed by Anita Gordon. Agnes de Mille was asked to choreograph the film, but declined.

Paint Your Wagon was shot near Baker City, Oregon, with filming beginning in May 1968 and ending that October. Other locations included Big Bear Lake, California, and the San Bernardino National Forest; the interiors were filmed at Paramount Studios, with Joshua Logan directing. The film's initial budget was $10 million, before it eventually doubled to $20 million. A daily expense of $80,000 was incurred to transport cast and crew to the filming location, as the closest hotel was nearly 60 miles away. The elaborate camp used in the film cost $2.4 million to build.

A rainstorm destroyed the road connecting the set to Baker City and Paramount had to pay $10,000 per mile to rebuild the road. Lerner almost fell down a 400-foot cliff during filming. Hippies who had been cast as extras formed a union and threatened to strike unless their daily pay was increased to $25.

The film was released at a time when movie musicals were going out of fashion, especially with younger audiences. Its overblown budget and nearly three-hour length became notorious in the press. Eastwood was frustrated by the long delays in the making of the film, later saying that the experience strengthened his resolve to become a director. According to Robert Osborne, Marvin drank heavily during filming, which may have enhanced his screen appearance, but led to delays and many retakes.

== Release ==
Paramount Pictures attempted to secure a G rating for Paint Your Wagon, but the Motion Picture Association of America (MPAA) instead gave the film an "M" (for mature audiences) rating. Martin S. Davis, executive vice-president for Gulf and Western, Paramount's parent company, appealed the decision and used Sweet Charity (1969) as a precedent. However, the MPAA was not convinced, and Paramount's appeal was defeated by a vote of 10 to 9.

Paint Your Wagon opened at Loew's State II theatre in New York City on October 15, 1969. In the UK, Paint Your Wagon had a 79-week 70mm roadshow run at the Astoria Theatre in London.

=== Home media ===
Paint Your Wagon was first released on VHS 1991 by Paramount Home Entertainment with an original PG rated from MPAA. In 2001, Paramount released this film on DVD, and it was re-rated to PG-13 for thematic material by the MPAA. In the digital versions, the intermission was removed from the film. In March 2024, Kino Lorber released Paint Your Wagon on 4K Ultra Blu-Ray and standard Blu-Ray versions.

== Reception ==
=== Box office ===
Paint Your Wagon grossed $50,506 in its first week. It opened in Los Angeles the following week and immediately expanded to another 12 cities. It reached number one at the US box office in its eighth week of release. Due to the film's expensive production budget and disappointing returns, Paramount took an initial write-off of $11 million; however, the film performed better during the summer of 1970. They later reversed around $6 million of the write-off.

Paint Your Wagon became Paramount's sixth-largest success up to that point (and the seventh highest-grossing film of 1969); over its release, it grossed $31.6 million, although the earnings never offset the cost of production and marketing.

=== Critical response ===
Paint Your Wagon received mixed reviews from film critics. Variety felt Paint Your Wagon was a "visually beautiful film", though they acknowledged: "What the film lacks in a skimpy story line it makes up in the music and expert choreography." They wrote that "the acting was fine, although Marvin tends to become too broad in certain comedy scenes. His dramatic scenes are tops, however, as are Eastwood's and Miss Seberg's." Vincent Canby of The New York Times wrote that the film was "an amiable, $20-million musical. That's a high price to pay for something that is more an expression of good intentions than evidence of sustained cinematic accomplishment." He acknowledged the three lead actors were "not singers by the stretch of anybody's imagination, but they are appealing performers and they come on with such legitimate, graceful good humor that they disarm the sort of criticism demanded by more aggressive personalities."

Roger Ebert of the Chicago Sun-Times gave this film two stars out of four, describing the film as "a big, heavy lump. But in the midst of it, like a visitor from another movie, Lee Marvin desperately labors to inject some flash and sparkle." He also felt the soundtrack was "loud and officially stereophonic, all right. But it's studio music — cold, aloof". Gene Siskel of the Chicago Tribune wrote: "Paint Your Wagon might have been a fine musical, might have been a fine western, or it might have been a fine western musical. Unfortunately, Paint Your Wagon is none of these and ends up being the year's biggest disappointment. The story is intricate; it occasionally glitters, but it certainly isn't gold."

Charles Champlin of the Los Angeles Times felt "the root problem is that the Lerner and Loewe musical, which can't succeed without wit and charm, succeeds only in making a spectacle of itself." While he was favorable towards Eastwood and Seberg's performances, he wrote negatively of Marvin's character, stating he "never wins our (my) sympathy as a proud loner with any kind of oblique dignity. Drunks stopped being funny some time back." Pauline Kael of The New Yorker panned the film, writing, "Paint Your Wagon plays it so safe that it has been directed by a man whose qualification is having directed Camelot, which was also a failure, but in the same financial class. Here he is, making another big musical with stars who can neither sing nor dance; their qualification is that two of them appeared a year earlier on the lists of top box-office stars."

On the review aggregator website Rotten Tomatoes, 45% of 20 critics' reviews are positive, with an average rating of 4.8/10. Metacritic, which uses a weighted average, assigned the film a score of 50 out of 100, based on 7 critics, indicating "mixed or average" reviews.

Logan stated that his career never recovered from Paint Your Wagon. This was the last film directed by him until his death in 1988.

=== Awards and nominations ===
Award	Year	Category	Nominee	Result	Ref.
Academy Award	1970	Best Music, Score of a Musical Picture (Original or Adaptation)	Nelson Riddle	Nominated	
Fotogramas de Plata	1971	Best Foreign Performer	Lee Marvin	Won	
Golden Globes	1970	Best Motion Picture – Musical or Comedy		Nominated	
Golden Globes	1970	Best Actor in a Motion Picture – Musical or Comedy	Lee Marvin	Nominated	

== Soundtrack ==
- Tom Scott Quartet, Paint Your Wagon (Flying Dutchman, 1970)

Marvin's rendition of "Wand'rin' Star," accompanied by the film's choir, became a number one hit in the UK. His voice was described by Jean Seberg as "like rain gurgling down a rusty pipe". Interviewed on NPR, Marvin said that the song was a hit in Australia, and someone there described it as "The first 33⅓ recorded at 45."

== In popular culture ==
- Paint Your Wagon was parodied in "All Singing, All Dancing", which is the eleventh episode of the ninth season of the American animated television series The Simpsons.

== Bibliography ==
- Hughes, Howard (2009). Aim for the Heart: The Films of Clint Eastwood. London: I.B. Tauris. ISBN 978-1-84511-902-7.
- Kennedy, Matthew (2014). Roadshow!: The Fall of Film Musicals in the 1960s. Oxford University Press. ISBN 978-0-199-92567-4.
- Logan, Joshua (1978). Movie Stars, Real People and Me. New York: Delacorte Press. ISBN 978-0-440-16117-2.
- Munn, Michael (1992). Clint Eastwood: Hollywood's Loner. London: Robson Books. ISBN 978-0-860-51790-0.
- Medved, Harry; Medved, Michael (1984). The Hollywood Hall of Shame: The Most Expensive Flops in Movie History. Angus & Robertson. ISBN 978-0-207-14929-0.
- Parish, James Robert (2006). Fiasco: A History of Hollywood's Iconic Flops. Hoboken, New Jersey: John Wiley & Sons. pp. 61–79. ISBN 978-0-471-69159-4.
