= Alan Dexter =

American film, stage and television actor

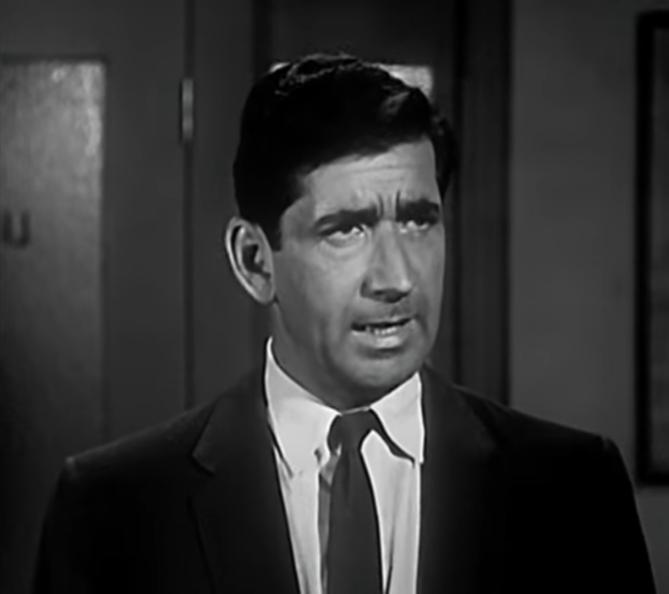
- Dexter in Man with a Camera, 1960
- Born: Alan Persching Dexter; October 21, 1918; Oklahoma, U.S.
- Died: December 19, 1983 (aged 65); Oxnard, California, U.S.
- Occupations: Film, stage and television actor
- Years active: 1943–1978
- Spouse: Betty Dexter

Alan Persching Dexter (October 21, 1918 – December 19, 1983) was an American film, stage and television actor.

== Life and career ==
Dexter was born in Oklahoma. He began his career in 1943, appearing in an uncredited role in the film This Is the Army. Later in his career, he guest-starred in numerous television programs including The Andy Griffith Show, Bonanza, Shotgun Slade, The Dick Van Dyke Show, That Girl, The Virginian, The Many Loves of Dobie Gillis, Perry Mason, Gomer Pyle - U.S.M.C., The Jack Benny Program, The George Burns and Gracie Allen Show, Navy Log, The Twilight Zone, The Odd Couple, The Fugitive, Man with a Camera, Get Smart, Have Gun – Will Travel, The Untouchables, Ironside and Gunsmoke. Dexter also played Frank Ferguson in the soap opera television series Days of Our Lives from 1965 to 1966.

In his film career, Dexter appeared in films such as, Forbidden, Operation Petticoat, The Enemy Below, The Mississippi Gambler, My Man and I, Cell 2455, Death Row, The Eternal Sea, Voice in the Mirror, Down Three Dark Streets, Column South, Sailor Beware, Girls in the Night, City of Bad Men, and It Came from Outer Space. He played Roy the Photographer in the 1958 film Step Down to Terror, as well as playing the role of Bill Farrell's friend "Sam Benson" in the film I Married a Monster from Outer Space in the same year. Dexter also appeared as Joe in the 1964 film The Brass Bottle and as Parson in the 1969 film Paint Your Wagon.

== Death ==
Dexter died in December 1983 of a heart attack in Oxnard, California, at the age of 65.
