= Paul Hampton =

American actor (born 1937)

- Born: Paul Schwartz; August 20, 1937 (age 88); Oklahoma City, Oklahoma, US
- Occupations: Actor; singer; composer

Paul Hampton (born August 20, 1937) is an American actor, singer, lyricist and writer.

== Career ==
While he was a sophomore at Dartmouth College, he was signed to Columbia Records and Columbia Pictures at the same time to write music with Hal David and Burt Bacharach. In 1960, with Bacharach he co-composed and performed the strange death disc "Two Hour Honeymoon" (Dot Records). After this initial outing he co-wrote hits for Don Gibson ("Sea of Heartbreak"), Gene Pitney ("Donna Means Heartbreak"), Johnny Tillotson ("I Rise, I Fall") and hits for overseas artists ("Angry at the Old Oak Tree.") Also he wrote the theme for "My Mother the Car" and sang it under the group name Albuquerque. He made two albums, "Beautiful Beginnings" and "Rest Home For Children."

Some of his songs have been recorded by Sammy Davis Jr., Bette Midler, Eddy Arnold, Tom Jones, Merle Haggard, Ricky Nelson, Elvis Presley, Gene Pitney and Johnny Cash.

His film career began in 1958 starring in Senior Prom. Many television appearances ensued such as The New Phil Silvers Show, The Doris Day Show, The Smothers Brothers Comedy Hour, McCloud, Ironside, Combat!, Benson and others. Some notable movie appearances were in Lady Sings the Blues, Shivers, Hit!, More Dead Than Alive, as a trigger-happy punk, and the award-winning television show Never Forget. Hampton continues to act and compose today (2010).

In 2008 Tony Award-winning actress and singer Idina Menzel recorded Hampton's song "Hope" for the Major League Baseball Stand Up To Cancer charitable program.

He is the ASCAP award-winning songwriter for "Sea of Heartbreak", used in the soundtrack for the films The Butcher Boy, A Perfect World, Heartbreak Ridge and Clay Pigeons. In 2010 singer Rosanne Cash covered the song in a duo with Bruce Springsteen which received a Grammy nomination and was promoted as the single from her album The List.

== Selected filmography ==
- 1958 Senior Prom as Tom Harper
- 1966 Women of the Prehistoric Planet as Wilson
- 1968 More Dead Than Alive as Billy
- 1970 Black Water Gold as Roger
- 1970 WUSA as Rusty Fargo
- 1971 Private Duty Nurses as Dewey
- 1972 Lady Sings the Blues as Harry
- 1973 Hit! as Barry Strong
- 1975 Shivers as Roger St. Luc
- 1979 CHiPs as Gary Bennett
- 1982 Butterfly as Norton
- 1987 Winners Take All as Frank Bushing
- 1992 Waxwork II: Lost in Time as Prosecution
- 1993 The Thing Called Love as Doug Siskin
- 1993 Babylon 5: The Gathering as The Senator
- 1995 The Stranger as Buck

== Music ==
- 1957: Play it Cool b/w Classy Babe
- 1957: Rockin' Doll b/w Please Love Me
- 1957: Slam Bam Thank You Ma'am b/w Live A Life of Love
- 1958: Love b/w The Longer I Love You
- 1959: Write Me b/w Don't Unless You Love Me
- 1960: Two Hour Honeymoon b/w Creams
- 1963: I'm In Love With A Bunny* (At The Playboy* Club) b/w Bandera
- 1965: My Mother the Car – composer: theme music. Song performed by Hampton under the name Albuquerque.
- 1970: ALBUM – Beautiful Beginnings, Barnaby Records
- 1974: ALBUM – Rest Home For Children, Crested Butte Records
