= Roberto Contreras =

Mexican-American actor (1928–2000)

- Born: December 12, 1928; St. Louis, Missouri, U.S.
- Died: July 18, 2000 (aged 71); Los Angeles, California, U.S.
- Occupation: Actor
- Years active: 1954–1993
- Known for: The High Chaparral (1967–1971)
- Children: Luis Contreras

Roberto Contreras (December 12, 1928 – July 18, 2000) was a Mexican-American actor, best known for portraying Pedro on the Western television series The High Chaparral (1967–1971).

== Life and career ==
Contreras was born in St. Louis, Missouri in 1928. His father, Jamie Contreras, was a Mexican filmmaker. The family moved to Mexico City when Contreras was 10-years-old, where he was raised.

He made his first film appearances in Mexico in 1954. Later in the decade, he moved to the United States. His film and television career spanned nearly 40 years from 1954 to 1993, including featured roles in Topaz and Scarface.

He played the bartender in “Heritage of Anger” S2 E37 of Have Gun Will Travel 6-6-59.

== Personal life and death ==
Contreras was the father of actor Luis Contreras (1950–2004). He died on July 18, 2000, in Los Angeles.

== Filmography ==
- La rebelión de los colgados (1954)
- En carne viva (1954)
- The Beast of Hollow Mountain (1956) - Carlos (uncredited)
- The Black Scorpion (1957) - Chumacho (uncredited)
- Ride a Violent Mile (1957) - Abruzo (uncredited)
- The Flame Barrier (1958) - Village Indian
- The Badlanders (1958) - Pepe (uncredited)
- Holiday for Lovers (1959) - Policeman (uncredited)
- The Miracle (1959) - Knife Grinder (uncredited)
- Have Gun, Will Travel (1960)- Duke of Texas- as a Peasant. Season 4, Episode 31.
- The Magnificent Seven (1960) - Villager (uncredited)
- Gold of the Seven Saints (1961) - Armenderez, Gondora Gunman
- California (1963) - Lt. Sanchez
- Rio Conchos (1964) - Mexican at Corral (uncredited)
- Mara of the Wilderness (1965) - Friday
- Brainstorm (1965) - Asylum Inmate (uncredited)
- Marriage on the Rocks (1965) - Assistant (uncredited)
- Alvarez Kelly (1966) - Sanchez (uncredited)
- The Appaloosa (1966) - Flacco the Pulqueria Bartender (uncredited)
- The Professionals (1966) - Bandit (uncredited)
- Chubasco (1967) - Wheelman (uncredited)
- The Last Challenge (1967) - Hotelero (uncredited)
- Topaz (1969) - Muñoz
- El extraño caso de Rachel K (1973)
- Pets (1973) - The Gardener
- Cantata de Chile (1976)
- Black Samurai (1977) - Chavez
- The Dark (1979) - Max
- The Day Time Ended (1979) - Gas station attendant
- Barbarosa (1982) - Cantina Owner
- Scarface (1983) - Emilio Rebenga
- Blue City (1986) - Hot Dog Vendor
- The Underachievers (1987) - Hispanic Man
- Blood In, Blood Out (1993) - Cruz's Grandfather (final film role)
