= Gold of the Seven Saints =

1961 film

- Theatrical release poster
- Directed by: Gordon Douglas
- Screenplay by: Leigh Brackett; Leonard Freeman
- Based on: Desert Guns; 1957 novel by Steve Frazee
- Produced by: Leonard Freeman
- Starring: Clint Walker; Roger Moore; Robert Middleton; Chill Wills; Letícia Román
- Cinematography: Joseph F. Biroc
- Edited by: Folmar Blangsted
- Music by: Howard Jackson
- Production company: Warner Bros. Pictures
- Distributed by: Warner Bros. Pictures
- Release date: February 18, 1961
- Running time: 88 minutes
- Country: United States
- Language: English

Gold of the Seven Saints is a 1961 American Western film adaptation of a 1957 Steve Frazee novel titled Desert Guns. Released by Warner Bros. Pictures, the 88-minute film stars Clint Walker, Roger Moore, Letícia Román, Robert Middleton, and Chill Wills. It was directed by Gordon Douglas, who had earlier directed Walker in 1958's Fort Dobbs and 1959's Yellowstone Kelly. Leigh Brackett wrote the screenplay and Joseph F. Biroc provided the black-and-white photography, most of which was shot in and around Arches National Park in Utah. The film did not do very well at the box office.

== Plot ==
Two fur traders, Jim Rainbolt (Clint Walker) and Shaun Garrett (Roger Moore), stumble across a big gold strike. Shaun goes to a nearby town to buy a pack horse for the gold, but makes the mistake of paying for the animal with a gold nugget. This lets the bandits who run the town, led by the ruthless McCracken (Gene Evans), know that they've stuck gold. McCracken and his men follow Shawn back to the strike. Jim and Shaun set out for the town of Seven Saints, but soon realize they are being followed. Knowing they can't outrun their pursuers while weighed down with 250 lbs. of gold, they hide the gold behind a giant boulder. In a shootout with the bandits Shaun is wounded, but Doc Gates (Chill Wills), who had also seen Shaun in town and knows about the gold, shows up out of nowhere to help them fight off the bandits. He then patches Shaun up and is made a full partner. The three men take refuge at the ranch of Amos Gondora, an old friend of Jim's. There they are introduced to Gondora's so-called "ward," an Indian maiden called Tita (Letícia Román). That night some of McCracken's men stage a stampede of Gondora's cattle to draw Jim and Gondora away. While they are gone, McCracken and his men ride up to the ranch and search for the gold. When they don't find it, they take Shaun and Doc captive. McCracken kills Doc because he is unable to tell the hiding place of the gold.

Shaun does not know how to find the hiding place and even under torture cannot lead anyone to the gold. Rainbolt tracks and finds McCracken and his men. After a shootout, McCracken is the only one left of his gang, but he has a gun to Shaun's head and compels Rainbolt to lead him to the gold. When they get there, Rainbolt feigns being unable to move the boulder alone, drawing McCracken in close enough for Rainbolt to roll another boulder onto McCracken's leg, trapping him. Rainbolt and Garrett intend to leave McCracken there to die, but Gondora and his men show up and kill McCracken.

Everything seems fine until Gondora puts friendship aside and demands the gold for himself. Jim and Shaun run from them and must cross a rushing river to get away. The bags of gold fall apart in the river and the gold is lost. After they laugh at this turn of events, Gondora pledges his friendship again and Rainbolt and Garrett set out to return to their fur trapping.

== Cast ==
- Clint Walker as Jim Rainbolt
- Roger Moore as Shaun Garrett
- Robert Middleton as Gondora
- Chill Wills as Doc Gates
- Letícia Román as Tita
- Gene Evans as McCracken
- Roberto Contreras as Armenderez, Gondora Gunman
- Jack Williams as Ames
- Art Stewart as Ricca
- Nestor Paiva as Gondora Henchman
- Christopher Dark as Frank
- Lalo Rios as Mexican Robber
- Vito Scotti as Gondara's Cook

== Production ==
Parts of the film were shot in Professor Valley, Fisher Towers, Arches, Dead Horse Point, Kane Creek Canyon, King's Bottom, Sevenmile Wash, and Klondike Flats in Utah.
