= Sam Whiskey =

1969 film

- Theatrical release poster
- Directed by: Arnold Laven
- Screenplay by: William W. Norton
- Produced by: Jules V. Levy; Arthur Gardner; Arnold Laven
- Starring: Burt Reynolds; Angie Dickinson; Clint Walker; Ossie Davis
- Cinematography: Robert C. Moreno
- Edited by: John Woodcock
- Music by: Herschel Burke Gilbert
- Production companies: Brighton Pictures; Levy-Gardner-Laven
- Distributed by: United Artists
- Release date: April 1, 1969 (United States)
- Running time: 96 minutes
- Country: United States
- Language: English

Sam Whiskey is a 1969 American Western comedy film shot in DeLuxe Color and directed by Arnold Laven, starring Burt Reynolds, Angie Dickinson, Clint Walker and Ossie Davis. "Way ahead of its time," said Reynolds of the film. "I was playing light comedy and nobody cared."

== Plot ==
Sam Whiskey, an adventurer and rogue in the Old West, is seduced by Laura Breckenridge, a wealthy widow and daughter of a prominent Oklahoma political family, into promising to retrieve $250,000 in gold bars from a riverboat that recently sank in Colorado's Platte River. The gold had been stolen by Laura's late husband, Congressman Phillip Breckenridge, from the Denver Mint during an official visit and replaced with plated lead fakes. Once the mint receives its next inspection, due in one week, it will resume minting coins and discover the theft. Laura offers Sam $20,000 to recover and return the gold before her family name is ruined and she is convicted as an accomplice to her husband's crime. Sam enlists the help of Jedidiah Hooker, a blacksmith, and O. W. Bandy, an Army friend turned inventor, offering them shares of the reward.

They locate the sunken riverboat, unaware that they are being watched by Fat Henry Hobson and his gang. The gold is fifteen feet below the river's surface, so Bandy fashions a diving helmet for Sam out of a bucket and bellows, but Fat Henry and his gang capture Jed and Bandy. Thinking they have drowned Sam, who hides in the riverboat's half-submerged smokestack, they recover the gold and prepare to kill their captives, but Sam turns the tables with the help of one of Bandy's homemade machine guns. As Sam and his partners travel to Denver with the gold, they consider absconding to Mexico, but rein in the temptation when Laura rendezvouses with them to provide blueprints of the mint.

After kidnapping and assuming the identity of government inspector Thorston Bromley, Sam enters the mint and deliberately damages a gold-plated bronze bust of George Washington displayed in the lobby. He then insists on having it repaired and takes it to a local smithy, where Jed makes a mold of the bust and recasts the recovered gold. Again, they are spied on by Fat Henry's gang. While Sam and company bring the new bust to the mint, the gang breaks into the shop and steals the bronze original, mistaking it for the gold one. Sam continues his false inspection of the mint, and Jed and Bandy infiltrate the premises as plumbers and hide when the mint closes at nightfall. Under the noses of the guards, the trio use the mint's smelter to recast the bust back into gold bars and restock the vault. They then escape via the roof just as the mint's manager, who realized the plumbers were a sham, rushes back and notices the bust is missing from its plinth. Elsewhere, Fat Henry despairs upon discovering his pilfered bust is worthless. On a train leaving Denver the next morning, Sam splits the $20,000 with Jed and Bandy, but keeps Laura for himself.

== Cast ==
- Burt Reynolds as Sam Whiskey
- Clint Walker as O.W. Bandy
- Ossie Davis as Jed Hooker
- Angie Dickinson as Laura Breckenridge
- William Schallert as Mr. Perkins
- Woodrow Parfrey as Thorston Bromley
- Rick Davis as The Fat Man / Heney "Fat Henry" Hobson
- Del Reeves as The Fisherman
- Anthony James as Cousin Leroy
- John Damler as Hank
- Bob Adler as Pete
- William Boyett as Corporal
- Chubby Johnson as The Blacksmith
- Ayllene Gibbons as Annie "Big Annie"
- Amanda Harley as Mrs. Perkins

== Production ==
The film was made by the producing team of Levy-Gardner-Laven, who had collaborated on numerous films and TV movies.

It was based on an original screenplay by William Norton. It was originally called The Renegades, and then Whiskey's Renegades, and was acquired by Levy Gardner Laven in July 1967, along with another Norton script, Lions, Tigers and Bears. Norton had previously written The Scalphunters for the producers.

Burt Reynolds was signed in February 1968. Angie Dickinson was the female lead; she did a nude scene which she was reluctant to do but said the script required it.

Filming began 22 April 1968 at Universal Studios (although the film was released through United Artists).

== Mary McCarty ==
Throughout the film bits and pieces of a song about a saucy lady named Mary McCarty are revealed by Sam Whiskey (Burt Reynolds) with the final verse given to the viewers by Jed Hooker (Ossie Davis).

=== Whiskey and Gin ===
Mary McCarty was shy as a primrose,
her face was as fair as a morning in May.
Though many times tempted, she'd never surrender
her virtue more often than three times a day!

(the Chorus)
Whiskey and gin, whiskey and gin,
Mary McCarty loved whiskey and gin.

The Girls in the city are skinny and pretty.
Girls in the country have meat on their bones.
But Mary McCarty could give them all lessons
In contorted embraces and delicate moans.

(Chorus)

Mary McCarty had one simple failing:
She liked to have men three or four at a time.
Mary McCarty'd jump over the table —
She liked to be chased in the days of her prime.

(Chorus)

Mary McCarty has gone up to heaven.
She's mourned by her friends who recall her sad fate.
She perished one night in the arms of her lover
And passed from this world ... she was just eighty-eight.

(Chorus)

== Release ==
=== Film Rating ===
The film was one of the first to have a scene cut under the new MPAA rating system. The version submitted by director Laven to the MPAA included "a bare-from-the-waist-up shot" of Angie Dickinson. When faced with the prospect of an "R" rating (at the time an entirely new concept) Laven substituted a tighter shot of Dickinson from the shoulders up to avoid the "R" rating.

== Reception ==
=== Critical response ===
Film critic Vincent Canby wrote of the film, "Comedy Westerns aren't my favorite form of entertainment and Sam Whiskey is certainly not one of the best of the breed, but its pleasures are so unexpected that they deserve some modest appreciation ... The movie, written by William Norton (The Scalphunters) and directed by Arnold Laven, has a kind of clumsy charm, most of it contributed by the performances of Reynolds, who bears a creepy resemblance to Marlon Brando; Miss Dickinson, and Ossie Davis and Clint Walker, who help Reynolds execute a reversal on the usual movie heist."

More recently film critic Dennis Schwartz gave the film a mixed review, writing, "An amiable Western, whose tagline is "Don't mix with Sam Whiskey. It's risky!", that nevertheless proves tiresome under the belabored direction of Arnold Laven ... The cornball antics, the uninspired acting and the wearisome plot so slackly handled all add up leaving this dull Western in a state of mediocrity. This one might appeal only to die-hard fans of Reynolds."

== Legacy ==
Although the film was not a commercial success, it helped establish Burt Reynolds' screen persona as a cocky hero, which he would use to great success in the 1970s. Norton would write several Reynolds films, including White Lightning and Gator.
