= Larry Sherman (actor) =

American actor

Larry Sherman (February 2, 1923 – August 26, 2017) was an American actor, television writer, former sports journalist, and publicist. On screen, Sherman, a New York City-based actor, was best known for his recurring role as Judge Colin Fraser in Law & Order, as well as films like North by Northwest (1959) and Midnight Cowboy (1969). Off screen, Sherman served as the head writer of the television game show, The Joker's Wild during its original run on CBS in the 1970s. In 1982, Sherman was hired by businessman Donald Trump as the head of public relations for the Trump-owned New Jersey Generals football team, thereby becoming Trump's first publicist.

Sherman was a native of Syracuse, New York. He received bachelor's degrees in theater and journalism from the University of North Carolina at Chapel Hill. Sherman began his acting career on Broadway during the 1940s with stage roles in Maid in the Ozarks (1946), The Traitor (1949), Marriage Is for Single People, and I Gotta Get Out.

Sherman died from natural causes in New York on August 26, 2017, at the age of 94. He was survived by his wife of 60 years, Marion, and two children: a daughter, Flory, and a son, Charles Sherman, an entertainment publicist.

== Filmography ==
- Deadline – U.S.A. (1952) - Reporter (uncredited)
- North by Northwest (1959) - Cab driver (uncredited)
- Midnight Cowboy (1969) - Homeless man (uncredited)
- Manhattan (1979) - Atmosphere (uncredited)
- When Harry Met Sally... (1989) - Dinner (uncredited)
- Reversal of Fortune (1990) - Atmosphere (uncredited)
- Scenes from a Mall (1991) - Man on Carphone
- Robot in the Family (1994) - Man in Bathtub
- One Fine Day (1996) - Daily News Visitor
- Catch Me If You Can (2002) - Cab driver (uncredited)
- Boricua (2004) - Baseball Play-by-Play
- The Terminal (2004) - Man at the airport (uncredited)
- The Comedian (2016) - Man in bar (uncredited) (final film role)
