= Sidekicks (1974 film) =

- DVD cover
- Genre: Comedy; Western
- Written by: William Bowers
- Directed by: Burt Kennedy
- Starring: Larry Hagman; Louis Gossett Jr. Blythe Danner; Jack Elam; Harry Morgan
- Music by: David Shire
- Country of origin: United States
- Original language: English

Production
- Executive producer: James Garner
- Producer: Burt Kennedy
- Cinematography: Robert B. Hauser
- Editor: Michael Pozen
- Running time: 73 minutes
- Production companies: Cherokee Productions; Warner Bros. Television

Original release
- Network: CBS
- Release: March 21, 1974

Related
- Skin Game

Sidekicks is a 1974 American made-for-television comedy Western film directed by Burt Kennedy and starring Larry Hagman and Louis Gossett Jr. The film was a pilot for a proposed television show as a continuation of the 1971 theatrical release Skin Game, with James Garner and Gossett.

== Plot ==
Quince and Jason, two grifters traveling the Old West, are arrested by Prudy Jenkins, the zealous, rifle-wielding daughter of a small-town sheriff. The charge: They look like typical criminals. She delivers her quarry to the sheriff, but he orders her to release them. Later, though, the sheriff witnesses the two in a gunfight outside a saloon. This time, he locks them up. Then he makes his first blunder. He leaves Prudy in charge of the prisoners while he goes on an errand. Sure enough, two outlaws, Sam and Ed, break into the jail, tie up Prudy, and abscond with Quince and Jason, mistaking them for two suspected bank robbers.

The quartet ride out of town where they meet Sam and Ed's boss. As one would never suspect, his name is Boss, and he does what most bosses do—he throws a temper tantrum. He then lays into Sam and Ed for breaking the wrong criminals out of jail. Later, Prudy stumbles upon the gang's encampment. Boss has another tantrum. This time, he's so mad he decides to rob the town's bank. But the gang arrives too late as they witness the "right" criminals pulling off the job. Boss has another tantrum. He then orders his gang to overtake the bandits and their loot—which they do. Then the sheriff and his posse wander onto the scene. In the resulting confusion, all criminals are arrested, Quince and Jason are kicked out of the county, and Prudy is saved from a fate worse than sanity.

== Cast ==
- Larry Hagman as Quince Drew
- Louis Gossett Jr. as Jason O'Rourke
- Blythe Danner as Prudy Jenkins
- Jack Elam as Boss
- Harry Morgan as Sheriff Jenkins
- Hal Williams as Max
- Gene Evans as Sam
- Noah Beery Jr. as Tom
- Dick Peabody as Ed
- Denver Pyle as Drunk
- John Beck as Luke
- Dick Haynes as Man
- Bill Shannon as Carl (as Billy Shannon)
- Tyler McVey as Jones
