= Shootout in a One-Dog Town =

1974 TV film

- VHS cover art
- Screenplay by: Larry Cohen; Dick Nelson
- Story by: Larry Cohen
- Directed by: Burt Kennedy
- Starring: Richard Crenna; Stefanie Powers; Jack Elam; Michael Ansara
- Music by: Hoyt Curtin
- Country of origin: United States
- Original language: English

Production
- Executive producers: Joseph Barbera; William Hanna
- Producer: Richard E. Lyons
- Production locations: Durango, Mexico; Sierra de Organos, Sombrerete, Zacatecas, Mexico; Bavispe, Sonora, Mexico; Pilares de Nacozari, Sonora, Mexico
- Cinematography: Robert B. Hauser
- Editor: Warner E. Leighton
- Running time: 78 minutes
- Production company: Hanna-Barbera Productions

Original release
- Network: ABC
- Release: January 9, 1974

Shootout in a One-Dog Town is a 1974 American Western television film produced by Hanna-Barbera Productions starring Richard Crenna and Stefanie Powers and directed by Burt Kennedy. It was originally written by Larry Cohen and rewritten by others. The film was broadcast as the ABC Movie of the Week on January 9, 1974.

== Plot ==
A mortally-wounded courier (Michael Ansara) arrives in a small town, and asks the town banker (Richard Crenna) to safeguard the valuable shipment which he has given his life to protect. Crenna agrees to do so, much to the chagrin of the townspeople who fear that the vicious gang of bad guys will now tear up the town to finally get their hands on the $200,000 stored in his bank.

== Cast ==
- Richard Crenna as Zack Wells
- Stefanie Powers as Letty Crandell
- Jack Elam as Handy
- Arthur O'Connell as Henry Gills
- Michael Ansara as Reynolds
- Dub Taylor as Halsey
- Gene Evans as Gabe
- Michael Anderson Jr. as Billy Boy
- Richard Egan as Petry
