= All the Kind Strangers =

- DVD cover
- Genre: Thriller
- Written by: Clyde Ware
- Directed by: Burt Kennedy
- Starring: Stacy Keach; Samantha Eggar; John Savage; Robby Benson
- Music by: Ron Frangipane
- Country of origin: United States
- Original language: English

Production
- Executive producer: Jerry Gross
- Producer: Roger Lewis
- Production location: Lebanon, Tennessee
- Cinematography: Robert B. Hauser; Gene Polito
- Editor: Folmar Blangsted
- Running time: 73 minutes
- Production company: Cinemation Industries

Original release
- Network: ABC
- Release: November 12, 1974

All the Kind Strangers, also known as Evil in the Swamp, is a 1974 American television film directed by Burt Kennedy. It originally aired as an ABC Movie of the Week on November 12, 1974.

== Plot summary ==
All the Kind Strangers

Jimmy Wheeler, a photojournalist driving through the rural United States while listening to folk country music spots a young boy walking. The boy, Gilbert, is carrying a large load of groceries. Taking pity on Gilbert, Jimmy offers to give him a ride, a journey that proves ominous and foreshadows danger.

Gilbert directs Jimmy, and the route is strange, leading to a river crossing and taking them well off the beaten path. The boy's home is remote. Guard dogs are also owned by the property-keeper proving a further threat. Inside, the photo journalist is introduced to "the family" consisting of multiple children with flat expressions. Most are taciturn and one, Martha, is mute. There is also "Baby", a boy who can barely communicate and has infantile behaviours and mannerisms.

The children insist that their parents will soon return home, but instead, Jimmy is greeted by Peter, the oldest child, who is imposing, strictly religious and patriarchal, despite appearing to look up to Jimmy. An adult woman named Carol is eventually discovered to be living there, the children's apparent "Mama", who behaves in a ditzy and somewhat clueless manner; when Peter's back is turned, however, she writes the word "HELP" in a pile of bleached white flour on the counter for Jimmy to see.

Peter finally admits to Jimmy, alongside Carol, that the father of the children was an abusive bootlegger who died by falling off the roof of the shack in a drunken stupor, while their mother had died birthing Baby several years earlier. Peter demands that Jimmy and Carol stay and become new surrogate parents for the children; they are free to leave if they wish, but previous "parents" who tried to leave in the past after being lured to the shack have all mysteriously disappeared. Peter's vicious attack dogs guard the property, Peter himself has a gun, and the area is totally remote so fleeing is next to impossible. That night, while the children sing Christian songs and hymns together, Jimmy and Carol discuss leaving. Jimmy notices that Martha listens in on every conversation since, as Carol notes, "Martha can't sing", but Martha harbours a crush on Jimmy and wants him to stay because of this. John, a bizarre older teenage boy, plays a cruel prank by leaving Gilbert's pet rattlesnake in Jimmy's bed, after which Peter shoots the snake dead and Gilbert sobs over the loss.

Jimmy attempts to flee the property after being ordered by Peter to punish John for the snake prank by giving the boy a spanking with a willow branch; John is surprised and touched when Jimmy orders John to think about the consequences of his actions rather than using corporal punishment. Twice as Jimmy and Carol attempt to flee the property, Peter deters them with his gun or with the dogs, while the high river across the property also acts as a further deterrent. Jimmy takes the children swimming and discovers numerous cars abandoned at the bottom of the swimming hole, suggesting that Peter has murdered previous visitors and dumped their assets there to hide evidence. Growing suspicious and frustrated, Peter has the children vote on whether to keep Jimmy and Carol as parents, something that they reluctantly agree to do, but Peter goes against the wishes of his siblings and drags Jimmy out to be shot early the next morning. The children group up upon the front porch and catch Peter in the act, revealing that they were all unaware that Peter was murdering the previous visitors and that they are shocked and horrified by Peter keeping this secret from them. Jimmy, taking a fatherly role and pitying Peter, offers to take Peter into the city for psychological help where people will understand his situation, leaving Carol to watch over the children until police can arrive and help them. Peter walks with Jimmy up the road and comes to appreciate Jimmy as the father he needed all along.

== Cast ==
- Stacy Keach as Jimmy Wheeler
- Samantha Eggar as Carol Ann
- John Savage as Peter
- Robby Benson as John
- Arlene Farber as Martha
- Tim Parkison as Gilbert
- Patti Parkison as Rita
- Brent Campbell as James
- John Connell as Baby

== Soundtrack ==
- Robby Benson - "All The Kind Strangers" (Music and lyrics by Regis Mull)
- Regis Mull - "What Are You Living For" (Music and lyrics by Regis Mull)

== See also ==
- List of American films of 1974
