= William Bowers =

American writer

- Born: January 17, 1916; Las Cruces, New Mexico, United States
- Died: March 27, 1987 (aged 71); Woodland Hills, California, United States
- Occupation: Writer

William Bowers (January 17, 1916 – March 27, 1987) was an American reporter, playwright, and screenwriter. He worked as a reporter in Long Beach, California and for Life magazine, and specialized in writing comedy-westerns. He also turned out several thrillers.

== Biography ==
Bowers was born in Las Cruces, New Mexico, the son of a local doctor. His family moved to Dallas, Texas when Bowers was five and then to Long Beach, California, where he attended Long Beach Poly High School in 1933. He attended the University of Missouri from 1933 to 1937.

He worked on newspapers for United Press. Bowers's first play was Where Do We Go From Here?, which was produced by Oscar Hammerstein and was based on his fraternity house at the University of Missouri. The play ran for 15 performances in 1938. This led to Bowers being offered a seven-year contract with Columbia Pictures to write movies starting at $100 a week. According to William Froug, "During the following twenty years he turned out scores of features ranging from wild comedies to melodramas to Westerns. His best work often combines elements of all three."

=== RKO ===
Bowers signed with RKO. His first credited screenplay was My Favorite Spy for Kay Kyser in 1942. Also at that studio Bowers helped write the musical comedy Seven Days' Leave (1942), which was a considerable hit, and The Adventures of a Rookie (1943) with the team of Carney and Brown. He also did Higher and Higher (1943), Frank Sinatra's second movie.

=== War service ===
During World War II, Bowers served in the United States Army Air Forces Civilian Pilot Training Program where he met Arch Hall Sr. Bowers later wrote a screenplay based on his experiences, The Last Time I Saw Archie, where Jack Webb played Bowers.

=== Post war ===
He wrote Sing Your Way Home (1945) with Jack Haley for RKO.

For Columbia he helped write The Notorious Lone Wolf (1946). Cary Grant arranged for him to be hired on the Cole Porter biopic Night and Day (1946). Bowers said "that was one of those insane things when what I wrote in the morning, I mean this literally, they shot in the afternoon, and what I wrote in the afternoon, they shot the next morning. It was the first time I ever had this experience." He disliked the final movie but it was very popular.

For Republic Pictures he provided the story for The Fabulous Suzanne (1946) and he worked on Paramount's Ladies' Man (1947) for Eddie Bracken.

=== Universal ===
At Universal Bowers wrote The Web (1947), a noir, and Deanna Durbin's second last film Something in the Wind (1947). He provided the story for the Abbott and Costello comedy The Wistful Widow of Wagon Gap (1948) which he wrote with Bud Beauchamp, an old army friend of Bowers who comtimes collaborated with him; they sold it for $2,500.

Bowers wrote the Yvonne de Carlo-Dan Duryea Westerns Black Bart, Highwayman (1948) and River Lady (1948). He did some uncredited work on United Artists' Pitfall (1948).

He wrote a noir, Larceny (1948) then did a Sonja Henie musical, The Countess of Monte Cristo (1948).

A play he wrote entitled West of Tomorrow was filmed by 20th Century Fox as Jungle Patrol. Bowers did some uncredited work on Criss Cross (1949) and provided the story for the de Carlo vehicle, The Gal Who Took the West (1949). Bowers said he wrote the latter in four weeks at $750 a week; he claims Billy Wilder wanted to buy the latter and offered $100,000 but Universal decided to make it themselves.

He did some script work on Abandoned (1949).

He recalled in 1971 that " I think the guys who remember the studio system now remember it all wrong. Actually, it was one of the most pleasant systems in the world. I mean, they made fifty pictures a year, each one of them. They needed ail this material desperately. And if you were somebody who likes to do pictures, that was just heaven. I could do three or four a year, if I wanted to do them, if I wanted to work that hard."

=== The Gunfighter ===
In 1950 he was Oscar nominated for the gritty Gregory Peck Western, The Gunfighter at Fox. Bowers originally wrote this script, based on his own story, on "spec" for John Wayne. He says Wayne wanted to make it but only offered $10,000 so Bowers sold it to Fox for $70,000. He said " In a Western, like any other kind of story, the important thing is the story, not the authenticity. You have to first get a really good story then, if you put it in 1870, you go to your research department... But don't do that first. You'll waste more damn time trying to make it authentic before you ever even get a good story. The story is the important thing, the characterizations are the important thing, then you just put those characters in a Western."

Bowers wrote Convicted (1950) for Columbia, Mrs. O'Malley and Mr. Malone (1951) for MGM, Cry Danger (1951) for Robert Parrish at RKO, The Mob (1951) for Parrish at Columbia, and The San Francisco Story (1952) for Parrish at RKO.

He did Assignment: Paris (1952) for Parrish at Columbia and Split Second (1953) for Dick Powell at RKO. He did "The Girl on the Park Bench" (1953) for Powell's Four Star Theatre and some work on Beautiful But Dangerous (1954) for RKO.

For Where's Raymond? (1953) Bowers wrote the episodes "Christmas" and "Redecorate the Coffeeshop". He did "Trouble with Youth" for Ford Television Theatre (1954).

At Columbia he did Tight Spot (1955) and 5 Against the House (1955) for Phil Karlson. Bowers wrote "Prosper's Old Mother" (1955) and "It's Sunny Again" (1956) for General Electric Theatre and "Shoot the Moon" (1956) for Jane Wyman Presents The Fireside Theatre. At Fox he did a musical The Best Things in Life Are Free (1956). In May 1955 it was reported he was writing Lisbon for Ray Milland.

Universal hired him for the remake of My Man Godfrey in 1957. He later said that in 1957 his rate was around $5,000 a week. "I would take any job that interested me, and a lot of them were stories that they were having trouble with, and I would go on them and fix them up. I enjoyed what I was doing. I loved the studio life. I thought eating in the commissary was about as much fun as you could have. I was still the big movie fan. I just couldn't believe that I was working in pictures, that I was really working for those people.

=== The Sheepman ===
At MGM he wrote The Sheepman (1958) which earned him a second Oscar nomination. He stayed on at MGM to do The Law and Jake Wade (1958), and Imitation General (1959). Bowers said he turned the latter from a serious story into a comedy.

Bowers wrote a Bob Hope comedy in collaboration with Beauchamp, Alias Jesse James (1959). He did two films for Jack Webb, Deadline Midnight (1959) and The Last Time I Saw Archie (1961), the latter based on his war experiences. In May 1961 it was announced he was writing a film for Webb about heroin called Purple is the Color but that appears to have not been made.

Bowers was reunited with Glenn Ford in Company of Cowards? (1964). He wrote a Jerry Lewis comedy, Way... Way Out (1966) and a Western The Ride to Hangman's Tree (1967).

=== Support Your Local Sheriff ===
Bowers produced the last film that he is credited for, the Western parody Support Your Local Sheriff! (1969). In 1971 Bowers said he sold the script for $150,000 plus a percentage of the profits and estimated that he would earn in total half a million dollars off the movie. He also said by that stage had written almost fifty five produced films, with more than ten of them uncredited.

Bowers had a bit part as an actor in The Godfather Part II (1974).

He wrote a TV movie for Burt Kennedy, Sidekicks (1974). During his later career he focused on TV movies and an independent production: The Gun and the Pulpit (1974), Mobile Two (1975) (which he produced) Kate Bliss and the Ticker Tape Kid (1978), Shame, Shame on the Bixby Boys (1978), The Wild Wild West Revisited (1979), and More Wild Wild West (1980).

== Personal life ==
Bowers was an alcoholic for much for his career. He later recalled " It's very expensive to drink. You gotta work all the time because it's a messy life, drinking. You know, I was always being sued by somebody and I was suing somebody else."

== Filmography ==
=== Writer ===
- My Favorite Spy (1942)
- The Fabulous Suzanne (1946)
- Larceny (1948)
- The Gunfighter (1950)
- Assignment – Paris! (1952)
- Imitation General (1958)
- -30- (1959)
- The Last Time I Saw Archie (1961)
- Support Your Local Sheriff (1969)

=== Actor ===
- The Godfather Part II (1974) - Senate Committee Chairman

== Notes ==
- Froug, William (1991). The screenwriter looks at the screenwriter. Silman-James press.
