= Henry Jones (actor) =

American actor (1912–1999)

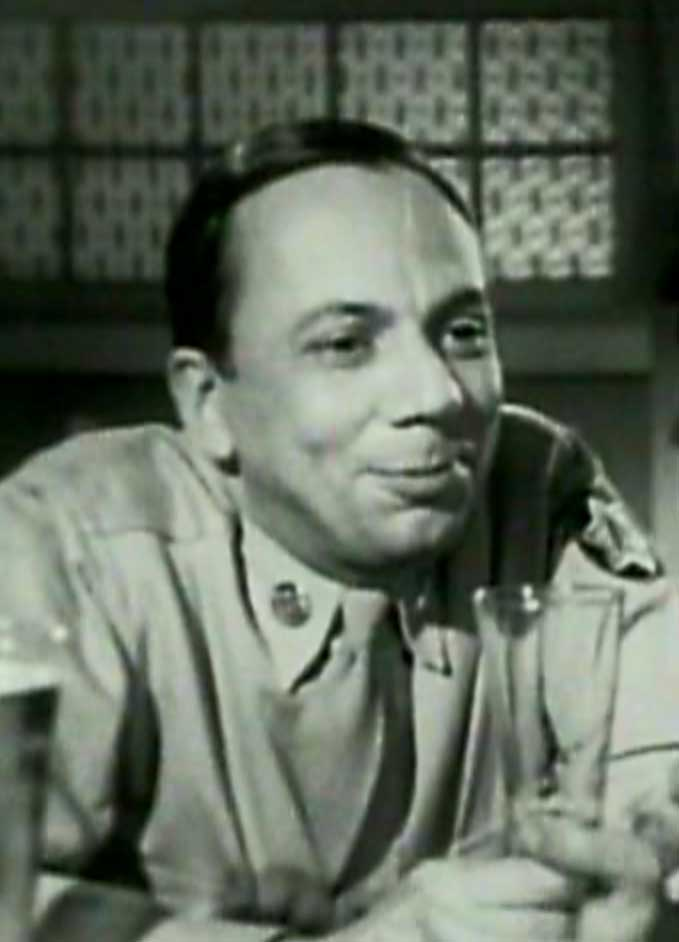
- Jones in The Lady Says No (1952)
- Born: Henry Burk Jones; August 1, 1912; New Jersey, US
- Died: May 17, 1999 (aged 86); Los Angeles, California, US
- Occupation: Actor
- Years active: 1938–1996
- Spouse(s): Yvonne Bergere (1942; her death); Judy Briggs (1946–61; divorce; 2 children)
- Relatives: Henry Burk (grandfather)

Henry Burk Jones (August 1, 1912 – May 17, 1999) was an American actor of stage, film, and television.

== Early years ==
Jones was born in New Jersey, and was raised in Philadelphia, Pennsylvania. He was the son of Helen (née Burk) and John Francis Xavier Jones. He was the grandson of Pennsylvania Representative Henry Burk, a German immigrant. Jones attended the St. Joseph's Preparatory School.

== Career ==
Early in his career, he performed with the Hedgerow Theatre near Philadelphia. His first Broadway appearance was in Maurice Evans's 1938 Hamlet. During World War II, he served in the Army and was cast in Irving Berlin's This is the Army.

Jones is remembered for his role as handyman Leroy Jessup in the movie The Bad Seed (1956), a role he originated on Broadway. Other theater credits included My Sister Eileen, The Time of Your Life, They Knew What They Wanted, The Solid Gold Cadillac, and Sunrise at Campobello, for which he won the Tony Award for Best Performance by a Featured Actor in a Play, and the Outer Critics Circle Award for Performance in a Drama. His last Broadway role was in Advise and Consent in 1960–1961.

Jones appeared in more than 180 films and television shows. His screen credits included The Girl Can't Help It with Jayne Mansfield, 3:10 to Yuma with Van Heflin, Will Success Spoil Rock Hunter? with Jayne Mansfield and Tony Randall, Alfred Hitchcock's Vertigo with James Stewart, Cash McCall with James Garner, The Bramble Bush with Richard Burton, Rascal with Bill Mumy, Butch Cassidy and the Sundance Kid with Paul Newman and Robert Redford, Dirty Dingus Magee with Frank Sinatra, Support Your Local Sheriff with James Garner and Walter Brennan, Support Your Local Gunfighter with James Garner, 9 to 5 with Dolly Parton and Lily Tomlin, and Arachnophobia with Jeff Daniels.

On television, Jones' best-remembered role was as the title character's father-in-law in the 1970s sitcom Phyllis. Jones portrayed Jed McCoy on a 1961 episode of the sitcom The Real McCoys. He had a regular role on the drama Channing, with Jason Evers.

Jones also appeared on Appointment with Adventure; Alfred Hitchcock Presents; The Investigators; The Eleventh Hour; Bewitched; Night Gallery; The Big Valley; Emergency!; The Mod Squad; Daniel Boone; Gunsmoke; The Twilight Zone; Thriller; Adam-12; The Doris Day Show; Father Knows Best; The Dukes of Hazzard; Flo; Magnum, P.I.; The Untouchables; Hawkins; Kolchak: The Night Stalker; MacGyver; Mr. Belvedere; The George Burns and Gracie Allen Show; The Mary Tyler Moore Show and Falcon Crest.

He played Dr. Smith's cousin in a 1966 episode of Lost in Space, "Curse of Cousin Smith". He appeared as R.J. Hoferkamp in the 1968 made-for-television movie Something for a Lonely Man. In 1967, he guest-starred as mysterious time traveling villain Mr. Pem in the S4E11 episode "A Time to Die" of the Sci-Fi TV show Voyage to the Bottom of the Sea. Jones returned as Pem in the 110th and last episode (S4E26) of the series, "No Way Back". He had earlier appeared in the S3E4 episode "Night of Terror" as a different character. Starting in 1974, he guest-starred three times on The Six Million Dollar Man as Dr. Jeffrey/Chester Dolenz. This character was a brilliant scientist who built lifelike robots, but although every plot was foiled, he still managed to escape to fight another day. In 1978, he appeared in the Barney Miller episode "The Prisoner".

In the mid-1980s, Jones appeared at local dining theater productions, including Winnipeg's Stage West.

== Personal life and death ==
Jones was married twice; his first wife Yvonne Bergere died in 1942 with the marriage lasting only 10 months. His second marriage was to Judy Briggs in 1948; they had two children, one of them being actress Jocelyn Jones. They divorced in 1961.

Jones died at UCLA Medical Center, Los Angeles, aged 86 from complications from injuries suffered in a fall at his home.

== Filmography ==
=== Film ===
Year	Title	Roles	Notes
1943	This Is the Army	Mr. Brown/World War One Bugle Audition Observer	Musical film produced by Hal B. Wallis and Jack L. Warner and directed by Michael Curtiz, uncredited
1949	Strawhat Cinderella	Stage Director	Short film directed and written by Justin Herman, uncredited
1950	Cowboy Crazy	Papa in His Study	Short film directed by and written by Justin Herman
1951	The Lady Says No	Potsy	Comedy film directed by Frank Ross
1953	Society Man	Narrator	Short film directed and produced by Justin Herman
1953	Taxi	Thorndike	Drama film directed by Gregory Ratoff, uncredited
1956	The Bad Seed	Leroy Jessup	Thriller film directed by Mervyn LeRoy
1956	The Girl He Left Behind	Hanson	
1956	The Girl Can't Help It	Mousie	
1957	Will Success Spoil Rock Hunter?	Henry Rufus	Satirical comedy film directed by Frank Tashlin
1957	3:10 To Yuma	Alex Potter	Western film directed by Delmer Daves
1958	Vertigo	Coroner	Drama film directed by Alfred Hitchcock
1960	Cash McCall	Gilmore Clark	Romantic drama film directed by Joseph Pevney
1960	The Bramble Bush	Parker Welk	
1961	Angel Baby	Ben Hays	
1965	Never Too Late	Dr. James Kimbrough	Comedy film directed by Bud Yorkin
1967	The Champagne Murders	Mr. Clarke	
1968	Stay Away, Joe	Hy Slager	Western-comedy film directed by Peter Tewksbury
1968	Project X	Dr. Crowther	
1969	Support Your Local Sheriff!	Henry Jackson	
1969	Angel in My Pocket	Mayor Will Sinclair	Comedy film feature directed by Alan Rafkin
1969	Rascal	Garth Shadwick	
1969	Butch Cassidy and the Sundance Kid	Bike Salesman	Western film directed by George Roy Hill
1970	The Cockeyed Cowboys of Calico County	Hanson	
1970	Rabbit, Run	Mr. Angstrom	
1970	Dirty Dingus Magee	Rev. Green	
1971	Support Your Local Gunfighter	Ez	Comedy-western film directed by Burt Kennedy
1971	Skin Game	Sam	
1972	Napoleon and Samantha	Mr. Gutteridge	
1972	Pete 'n' Tillie	Mr. Tucker	
1973	Tom Sawyer	Mr. Dobbins	Musical film directed by Don Taylor
1973	The Outfit	Doctor	
1977	Tail Gunner Joe	Armitage	TV movie
1980	9 to 5	Hinkle	Comedy film directed by Colin Higgins
1982	Deathtrap	Porter Milgrim	Drama film directed by Sidney Lumet
1983	Balboa	Jeffry Duncan	
1989	Nowhere to Run	Judge Culbert	
1990	Enid Is Sleeping	Old Man	
1990	Dick Tracy	Night Clerk	Action comic film directed by Warren Beatty
1990	Arachnophobia	Dr. Sam Metcalf	Thriller film directed by Frank Marshall
1990	The Grifters	Mr. Simms	Neo-noir film directed by Stephen Frears
1994	Breathing Lessons	Sam	TV movie

=== Television ===
year	title	role	notes
1949	Hands of Murder	Guest	Episode: "A Room Full of Water" (S 1:Ep 12)
1950	Studio One	Guest	Episode: "The Dusty Godmother: (S 2:Ep 27)
1950	The George Burns and Gracie Allen Show	Charles Jones	Episode: "The Kleebob Card Game" (S 1:Ep 1)
1950	Danger	Guest	Episode: "Another Man's Poison" (s 1:Ep 11)
1950	The Ford Theatre Hour	Guest	Episode: "Father Malachy's Miracle" (S 2:Ep 16)
1950	Actors Studio	Guest	Episode: "The Timid Guy" (S 2:Ep 18)
1950	Danger	Guest	Episode: "Surprise for the Boys" (S 1:Ep 14)
1951	Danger	Guest	Episode: "Footfalls" (S 1:Ep 16)
1951	Armstrong Circle Theatre	Guest	Episode: "The Big Rainbow" (S 2:Ep 47)
1951	The Web	Himself	Episode:"A Switch in Time" (S 1:Ep 47)
1951	Prudential Family Playhouse	Guest	Epispode: "Ruggles of Red Gap" (S 1:Ep 11)
1951	Big Town	Guest	Episode: "The Return" (S 1:Ep 28)
1951	Danger	Guest	Episode: "Death Gambles" (S 1:Ep 45)
1951	The Philco Television Playhouse	Guest	Episode: "Ephraim Tutt's Clean Hands" (S 3:Ep 48)
1951	The Web	Himself	Episode: "The Dishonorable Thief" (S 1:Ep 60)
1951	Big Town	Guest	Episode: "Neighborhood Story" (S 1:Ep 42)
1951	The Web	Himself	Episode: "All the Way to the Moon" (S 2:Ep 2)
1951	Armstrong Circle Theatre	Guest	Episode: "Marionettes" (S 3:Ep 13)
1951	Schlitz Playhouse	Guest	Episode: "Still Life" (S 1:Ep 4)
1951	Suspense	Man at Train Station	Episode: "The Far-Off House" (S 4:Ep 12)
1951	Lux Video Theatre	Sanford	Episode: "Dames Are Poison" (S 2:Ep 14)
1952	Gulf Playhouse	Guest	Episode: "The Duel" (S 1:Ep 7)
1952	Short Short Dramas	Guest	Episode: "Meet Me at the Liberty" (S 1:Ep 14)
1952	Gulf Playhouse	Guest	Episode: "Our Two Hundred Children" (S 1:Ep 10)
1952	Schlitz Playhouse	Guest	Episode: "P.G." (S 1:Ep 17)
1952	Short Short Dramas	Guest	Episode: "Night School" (S 1:Ep 23)
1952	Schlitz Playhouse	Guest	Episode: "Apple of His Eye" (S 1:Ep 22)
1952	Tales of Tomorrow	Guest	Episode: "A Bird in Hand" (S 1:Ep 45)
1952	Short Short Dramas	George Woodhull	Episode: "Equal Partners" (S 1:Ep 56)
1952	Lights Out	Guest	Episode: "A Lucky Piece" (S 4:Ep 34)
1952	Lux Video Theatre	Dan	Episode: "The Orchard" (S 2:Ep 51)
1952	The Philco Television Playhouse	Guest	Episode: "The Gift" (S 5:Ep 6)
1953	The Revlon Mirror Theater	Guest	Episode: "The Little Wife" (S 1:ep 1)
1953	Eye Witness	Guest	Episode: "The Righteous" (S 1:Ep 6)
1953	Suspense	Mr. Matches	Episode: "Mr. Matches" (S 5:Ep 13)
1953	The Doctor	Joey Martin	Episode: "Song for a Banker" (S 1:Ep 26)
1953	Tales of Tomorrow	Irwin	Episode: "The Spider's Web" (S 2:Ep 38)
1954	You Are There	Captain Kidd	Episode: "The Hanging of Captain Kidd (May 23, 1701)" (S 2:Ep 25)
1956	Alfred Hitchcock Presents	Wally Long	Season 2 Episode 3: "De Mortuis"
1957	Alfred Hitchcock Presents	Harry Parker	Season 2 Episode 16: "Nightmare in 4-D"
1957	Alfred Hitchcock Presents	George Tiffany	Season 2 Episode 35: "The West Warlock Time Capsule"
1958	Father Knows Best	Mr. Kermit	Episode: "Margaret's Other Family" (S4:Ep19)
1959	Alfred Hitchcock Presents	John Treadwell	Season 5 Episode 8: "The Blessington Method"
1959	The Twilight Zone	J. Hardy Hempstead	Episode: "Mr. Bevis" (S1:Ep 33)
1960	The Untouchables	Brooks Wells	Episode: "Portrait of a Thief" (S1:Ep 25)
1961	Thriller	Erik Borg	Episode: "The Weird Tailor" (S2:Ep 4)
1961	The Investigators	Gov	Episode: "The Dead End Man" (S 1:Ep 13)
1962	Alfred Hitchcock Presents	Miles Cheever	Season 7 Episode 23: "Profit-Sharing Plan"
1962	Route 66	Asa Turnbull	Episode: "Two on the House" (S2:Ep 27)
1962	Wagon Train	Ben Morrell	Episode: "The Teri Morrell Story" (S5:Ep 30)
1964	Bonanza	King Arthur / Uncle Leo	Episode: "A Knight to Remember" (S6:Ep 13)
1965	The Alfred Hitchcock Hour	Alex Marrow	Season 3 Episode 25: "The World's Oldest Motive"
1966	Lost in Space	Colonel Jeremiah Smith	Episode: "Curse of Cousin Smith" (S2:Ep 10)
1966	Voyage to the Bottom of the Sea	Dr. Sprauge	Episode: "Night of Terror" (S3:Ep 04)
1966	Bewitched	Brian O'Brian	Episode: "The Leprechaun" (S2:Ep 27)
1967	The Big Valley	General Alderson	Episode: "Court Martial"
1967	Gunsmoke	Harvey Cagle	Episode: "Stranger in Town"
1967	Daniel Boone	Landers	Episode: "The Spanish Horse"
1967	That Girl	T.L. Harrison	Season 2 Episode 3: "Black, White and Read All Over"
1967	Voyage to the Bottom of the Sea	Mr. Pem	Episode: "A Time To Die" (S4:Ep 11)
1968	Voyage to the Bottom of the Sea	Mr. Pem	Episode: "No Way Back" (S4:Ep 26)
1968	The Mod Squad	Herbert Milne	Episode: "My What A Pretty Bus" (S1:Ep 3)
1969	The Name of the Game	The Reverend Mr. McKim	Episode: "Love-In at Ground Zero" (S1:Ep 19)
1970	Gunsmoke	Papa Steiffer	"The Badge" (S15:Ep19)
1970	The Name of the Game	George	Episode: "Island of Gold and Precious Stones" (S2:Ep 16)
1970	Nanny and the Professor	Mr. Abercrombie	Episode: "I Think That I Shall Never See a Tree" (S1:EP 10)
1970	The Virginian	Ned Cochran	Episode: "No War for the Warrior" (S8:Ep 20)
1971	Love Hate Love	Tom Blunden	ABC Movie of the Week
1971	The Mod Squad	Paulie	Episode: "And a Little Child Shall Bleed Them" (S4:Ep 11)
1972	The Daughters of Joshua Cabe	Codge Collier	ABC Movie of the Week
1972	Emergency!	Dr. Alexander Knott	Episode: "Show Biz" (S2:Ep 3)
1972	Adam-12	Harry Craig	Episode: "Harry Nobody" (S5:Ep 7)
1972	Bonanza	Sheriff	Episode: "The Younger Brothers' Younger Brother" (S13: Ep 23)
1973	The Letters	The Mailman	ABC Movie of the Week
1973	The Doris Day Show	Sam Johnson	Episode: "The Last Huzzah" (S5:Ep 16)
1973	Hawkins	George Davis	Episode: "Die, Darling, Die" (S1:Ep 2)
1973	The Partridge Family	Mr. Phelps	Episode: "The Partridge Connection" (S3: Ep 22)
1973	Letters from Three Lovers	The Mailman	ABC Movie of the Week
1974	Owen Marshall, Counselor at Law	Dr. Metz	Episode: "The Desertion of Keith Ryder" (S3: Ep 22)
1974	Petrocelli	Wheaton	Episode: "A Life for a Life" (S1: Ep 5)
1974	The Six Million Dollar Man	Dr. Chester Dolenz	Episode: "Day Of The Robot" (S1: Ep 4) Episode: "Run, Steve, Run" (S1: Ep 13) and Episode: "Return Of The Robot Maker" (S2: Ep 15)
1974	Roll, Freddy, Roll!	Theodore Menlo	ABC Movie of the Week
1975–1977	Phyllis	Judge Jonathan Dexter	
1979	Mrs. Columbo	Josh Alden	Episode: "Word Games" (S1: Ep 01)
1981	CHiPs	Dutton	Episode "Diamond in the Rough" (S5:EP 8)
1982	The Love Boat	Frank Jensen	Episode "Good Neighbors/Captain's Portrait/Familiar Faces" (S5:Ep 14)
1985–1986	Falcon Crest	B. Riley Wicker	
1986	MacGyver	Charles 'Papa Chuck' Banning	Episode "The Eraser" (S2:Ep 2)
1987	Magnum, P.I.	The Butler	Episode "Murder by Night" (S7:Ep 13)
1988	Murder, She Wrote	Morris Penroy	Episode "Mr. Penroy's Vacation" (S5:Ep 3)
1990	Coach	Mr. Newbower	Episode "Cabin Fever" (S3:Ep 9)
