= Dick Peabody =

American actor (1925–1999)

- Born: April 6, 1925; Kansas City, Missouri
- Died: December 27, 1999 (aged 74); Camino, California
- Spouse: Tina

Richard Peabody (April 6, 1925 – December 27, 1999) was an American actor best known for his role as six-foot-six Pfc. Littlejohn on the 1960s series Combat!. Peabody worked in television, movies, radio, and print. He was tall and typecast himself as a western villain.

== Biography ==
Peabody was a World War II Navy veteran, and had an early career in radio commercial production.

He anchored a TV news broadcast, hosted a radio talk show, wrote commercials and, in later years, wrote "Peabody's Place", a weekly newspaper column for the Mountain Democrat in Placerville, California.

He was in the movies Support Your Local Sheriff! and The Good Guys and the Bad Guys in 1969; both films were directed by Burt Kennedy who worked on Combat!. He also appeared in Your Money or Your Wife in 1972.

His main TV credit was all five seasons of Combat!. He was also in various episodes of Cannon, Gunsmoke, Bonanza, and Daniel Boone.

== Personal life ==
His wife Tina, a former model, wrote "Young Sarge", a song Dick Peabody recorded in 1965.

He died of prostate cancer at the age of 74.

== Filmography ==
Year	Title	Role
1966	Bonanza "Destiny's Child" S7 E19	Sonny
1969	Mackenna's Gold	Avila
1969	Support Your Local Sheriff!	Luke Danby
1969	The Good Guys and the Bad Guys	Boyle
1970	The Moonshine War	Boyd Caswell
1971	Adam-12 "The Search" S4 E5	Boone

== See also ==
- Vic Morrow
- Rick Jason
