= Bonanza season 7 =

Bonanza
- Season 7
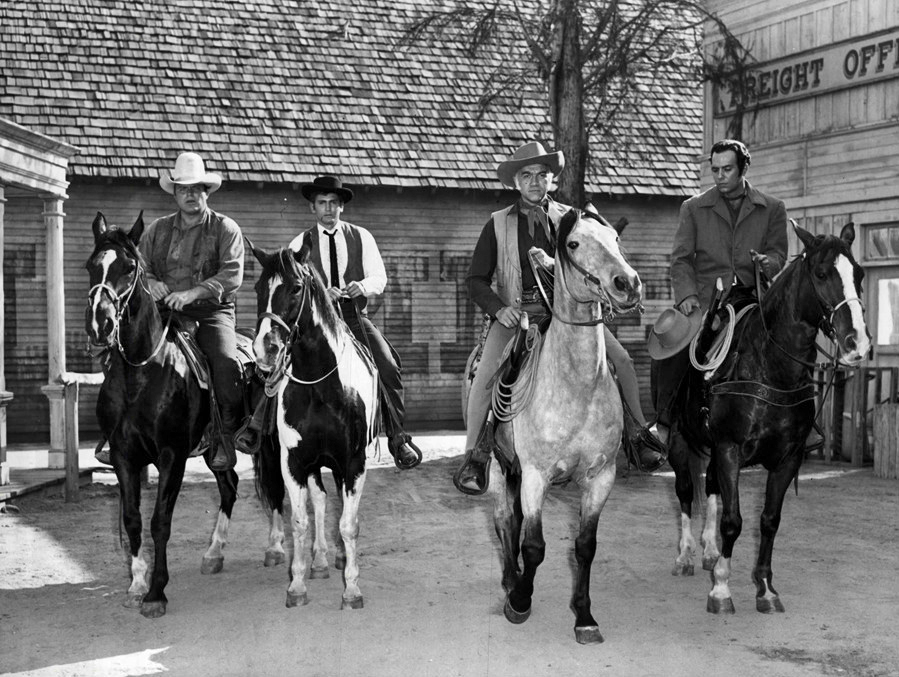
- Cast of Bonanza in 1959
- Starring: Lorne Greene; Dan Blocker; Michael Landon
- No. of episodes: 33

Release
- Original network: NBC
- Original release: September 12, 1965 – May 15, 1966

Season chronology
- ← Previous; Season 6 Next → Season 8

The seventh season of the American Western television series Bonanza premiered on NBC on September 12, 1965, with the final episode airing May 15, 1966. The series was developed and produced by David Dortort. Season seven starred Lorne Greene, Dan Blocker, and Michael Landon. It was the first season without Pernell Roberts. The season consisted of 33 episodes of a series total 431 hour-long episodes, the entirety of which was produced in color. Season seven was aired on Sundays at 9:00 p.m. It ranked #1 in the Nielsen ratings for the 1965-1966 season, the second of three straight seasons in the top spot.

== Synopsis ==
Bonanza is set around the Ponderosa Ranch near Virginia City, Nevada and chronicles the weekly adventures of the Cartwright family, consisting of Ben Cartwright and his three sons (each by a different wife), Adam, Eric ("Hoss"), and Joseph ("Little Joe"). A regular character is their ranch cook, Hop Sing.

== Cast and characters ==
=== Main cast ===
- Lorne Greene as Ben Cartwright
- Dan Blocker as Eric "Hoss" Cartwright
- Michael Landon as Joseph "Little Joe" Cartwright

=== Recurring ===
- Victor Sen Yung as Hop Sing
- Ray Teal as Sheriff Roy Coffee

=== Guest cast ===
- Mabel Albertson
- Mari Aldon
- Ina Balin
- Majel Barrett
- Robert V. Barron
- Ivor Barry
- Ed Begley
- Brooke Bundy
- Walter Burke
- Michael Burns
- Rod Cameron
- Lonny Chapman
- Robert Colbert
- Michael Conrad
- Tim Considine
- Glenn Corbett
- Jose De Vega
- John Doucette
- Robert Ellenstein
- Ross Elliott
- Jean Engstrom
- Stuart Erwin
- Hampton Fancher
- Brioni Farrell
- Eric Fleming
- Nancy Gates
- Steve Gravers
- Wayne Heffley
- Anne Helm
- Mitzi Hoag
- Eddie Hodges
- Clint Howard
- Sam Jaffe
- Victor Jory
- Sally Kellerman
- DeForest Kelley
- Jack Kruschen
- Wesley Lau
- Ken Lynch
- Gene Lyons
- Robert McQueeney
- Strother Martin
- George Montgomery
- Wayne Newton
- Ramon Novarro
- Dick Peabody
- Phillip Pine
- Ford Rainey
- Sue Randall
- Gilbert Roland
- Tommy Sands
- Jan Shepard
- Louise Sorel
- Liam Sullivan
- Tom Tully
- Victoria Vetri
- Marie Windsor
- Michael Witney

== Production ==
=== Casting ===
After trying for years to exit his six-year contract early, Pernell Roberts left the show at the end of season six. Season seven was the first to air without Roberts in the main cast.

=== Writing ===
With the departure of Pernell Roberts, the original plan was to kill off the character. However, the decision was made to have the character travel away from the Ponderosa. Should Roberts have changed his mind, he could have been written back into the series.

=== Filming ===
Filming locations for season seven included:

- Incline Village - "The Debt", "The Dublin Lad", "The Code", "Big Shadow on the Land", "The Fighters"
- Toiyabe National Forest and Incline Village - "The Other Son", "The Lonely Runner", "All Ye His Saints"
- Iverson's Movie Ranch - "The Strange One"
- Golden Oak Ranch - "Her Brother's Keeper"
- Vasquez Rocks - "The Last Mission"

== Episodes ==
Bonanza, season 7 episodes
No. overall	No. in season	Title	Directed by	Written by	Original release date
203	1	"The Debt"	William F. Claxton	William Blinn	September 12, 1965
Wiley Kane (Tommy Sands) and his sister Annie (Brooke Bundy) come to the Ponderosa to work off a debt from when their father Sam (Ford Rainey) who swindled Ben.
204	2	"The Dilemma"	William F. Claxton	John Hawkins and Ward Hawkins	September 19, 1965
Ben is appointed as a temporary circuit judge, but he faces a dilemma when a man he helped to parole is suspected of robbing the bank. Tom Tully guest stars.
205	3	"The Brass Box"	William F. Claxton	Paul Schneider	September 26, 1965
Old teller of tall tales Don Jose Ortega (Ramon Novarro) claims to have a brass box of land grants that gives him ownership over most of the area around Virginia City, including the Ponderosa.
206	4	"The Other Son"	William F. Claxton	Thomas Thompson	October 3, 1965
Ben hires mule skinner Clint Watson (Ed Begley) and his sons to take nitroglycerin to California.
207	5	"The Lonely Runner"	William Witney	Thomas Thompson	October 10, 1965
A judge awards horse breeder Jim Acton (Gilbert Roland)'s beloved prize mare to rancher Sam Whipple (Ken Lynch).
208	6	"Devil on Her Shoulder"	Virgil W. Vogel	Suzanne Clauser	October 17, 1965
The Cartwrights try to help a woman who is the member of a religious group: she is being accused of being possessed and being a witch. Ina Balin, John Doucette and Victoria Vetri guest star.
209	7	"Found Child"	Ralph E. Black	Frank Cleaver	October 24, 1965
Hoss protects and becomes attached to a little girl called Lisa (Eileen Baral), whose parents were killed in a stagecoach robbery.
210	8	"The Meredith Smith"	John Florea	Lois Hire	October 31, 1965
Ben must figure which person, all claiming to be Meredith Smith, is the true heir to the estate of Jake Smith, a friend of his who asked him to make sure his estate would be given to a relative. Robert Colbert, Anne Helm, Strother Martin guest star.
211	9	"Mighty is the Word"	William F. Claxton	Story by : Robert Goodwin; Teleplay by : Thomas Thompson	November 7, 1965
One of the Ponderosa's ranch hands plots revenge against the gunfighter-turned-preacher who killed his brother. Glenn Corbett, Michael Witney and Sue Randall guest star.
212	10	"The Strange One"	Gerd Oswald	Story by : Stephen Lord; Teleplay by : Jo Pagano and Stephen Lord	November 14, 1965
A woman suspected of being a witch takes refuge on the Ponderosa—where she amazes the Cartwrights with her ability to see the future. While recuperating, she predicts a future misfortune for Little Joe. Louise Sorel, Robert McQueeney and Jean Engstrom guest star.
213	11	"The Reluctant Rebel"	R. G. Springsteen	Wally George	November 21, 1965
Young rebel Billy Penn (Tim Considine) has second thoughts about life as an outlaw when the Cartwrights catch him stealing cattle.
214	12	"Five Sundowns to Sunup"	Gerd Oswald	William L. Stuart	December 5, 1965
A family of outlaws, guided by the mother, Elizabeth Lassiter (Marie Windsor), embarks on a kidnapping spree in order to prevent one of their own from being executed.
215	13	"A Natural Wizard"	Robert Totten	Story by : Suzanne Clauser; Teleplay by : William Blinn	December 12, 1965
Skeeter Dexter (Eddie Hodges) is a boy who loves animals and he helps Hoss take care of a pregnant cow. Skeeter had a brutal stepfather and he is now being blamed by his mother for his father abandonment.
216	14	"All Ye His Saints"	William F. Claxton	William Blinn	December 19, 1965
Little Michael Thorpe (Clint Howard) sets out to find God in the hope that he can heal his gravely wounded father.
217	15	"A Dublin Lad"	William F. Claxton	Mort Thaw	January 2, 1966
Joe serves on a jury intent on convicting Terrence O'Toole (Liam Sullivan) of murder.
218	16	"To Kill a Buffalo"	William F. Claxton	Michael Fisher	January 9, 1966
A badly injured Indian, affected by prejudice, reacts violently to Hoss's helping hand. Hoss tries to teach him to overcome his hostility to the white man. Jose De Vega and Steve Gravers guest star.
219	17	"Ride the Wind"	William Witney	Paul Schneider	January 16, 1966
220	18	"Ride the Wind"	William Witney	Paul Schneider	January 23, 1966
Part 1: Ben is not pleased with Joe's decision to join the Pony Express. Victor Jory, Rod Cameron and DeForest Kelley guest star. Part 2: In spite of increasing Indian attacks, Curtis Wade (Rod Cameron) is determined to keep the Pony Express going.
221	19	"Destiny's Child"	Gerd Oswald	Robert V. Barron	January 30, 1966
Ben tries to find jobs for a pair of strangers who helped him pull his wagon out of the mud. Robert V. Barron, Dick Peabody and Walter Burke guest star.
222	20	"Peace Officer"	William Witney	Don Mullally	February 6, 1966
Ruthless lawman Wes Dunn (Eric Fleming) is hired to halt the violence in Virginia City while Sheriff Coffee is out of town.
223	21	"The Code"	William F. Claxton	Sidney Ellis	February 13, 1966
Joe must decide whether to obey the code of the west and answer a gunfighter's challenge. George Montgomery, Jan Shepard and Robert Ellenstein guest star.
224	22	"Three Brides for Hoss"	Ralph E. Black	Jo Pagano	February 20, 1966
And ordinary day becomes everything but ordinary when Hoss receives three mail-order brides. Stuart Erwin, Majel Barrett and Mitzi Hoag guest star.
225	23	"The Emperor Norton"	William F. Claxton	Story by : Gerry Prince Young and Robert Sabaroff; Teleplay by : Robert Sabaroff	February 27, 1966
Joshua A. Norton (Sam Jaffe), a friend of Ben's who fancies himself an emperor, is about to be committed to an insane asylum.
226	24	"Her Brother's Keeper"	Virgil W. Vogel	Story by : Lee Pickett; Teleplay by : Mort Thaw	March 6, 1966
Claire Armory (Nancy Gates) falls in love with Ben, but her invalid brother Carl (Wesley Lau) complicates her courtship with him.
227	25	"The Trouble with Jamie"	R. G. Springsteen	Helen B. Hicks	March 20, 1966
Ben's cousin Matthew (Ross Elliott) from the East brings his wife Elizabeth (Tracy Olsen) and his spoiled son Jamie (Michael Burns) for a visit to the Ponderosa, requesting that Ben keeps an eye on Jamie for the next 2 months while on a business trip.
228	26	"Shining in Spain"	Maurice Geraghty	Elliott Gilbert	March 27, 1966
Joe falls for Wendy Daniels (Judi Rolin), a beautiful girl who's anticipating the arrival of her father Taylor (Gene Lyons).
229	27	"The Genius"	R. G. Springsteen	Don Mullally	April 3, 1966
Hoss tries to help poet William Warlock Evans (Lonny Chapman) beat his alcoholism by hiring him as a ranch hand for the Ponderosa.
230	28	"The Unwritten Commandment"	Gerd Oswald	Story by : Dan Ullman; Teleplay by : Jo Pagano and William Blinn	April 10, 1966
Young singer Andy Walker (Wayne Newton) wants to develop his talents against his stern father's wishes.
231	29	"Big Shadows on the Land"	William F. Claxton	William F. Leicester and Richard H. Bartlett	April 17, 1966
The Cartwrights deal with an immigrant winemaker family setting up business on Ponderosa land. Jack Kruschen and Brioni Farrell guest star.
232	30	"The Fighters"	R. G. Springsteen	Robert Goodwin	April 24, 1966
Hoss badly injures an over-the-hill boxer in a fight and refuses all other offers to box professionally. Michael Conrad, Phillip Pine and Mari Aldon guest star.
233	31	"Home from the Sea"	Jean Yarbrough	George F. Slavin and Stanley Adams	May 1, 1966
An old shipmate of Adam's plans to steal a shipment of gold from the Cartwrights. Ivor Barry and Wayne Heffley guest star.
234	32	"The Last Mission"	R. G. Springsteen	Story by : S. S. Schweitzer; Teleplay by : William Douglas Lansford and S. S. Schweitzer	May 8, 1966
Ben accompanies old Army buddy Colonel Keith Jarrell (R. G. Armstrong) on a mission to make peace with the Paiutes, but Hoss becomes suspicious about the Colonel's real intentions.
235	33	"A Dollar's Worth of Trouble"	Donald R. Daves	Robert Goodwin	May 15, 1966
Hoss has his palm read and is told that two people—a blonde and a gunman—will affect his life. Sally Kellerman, Mabel Albertson and Hampton Fancher guest star.

== Release ==
Season seven aired on Sundays from 9:00 pm–10:00 pm on NBC.

The two-part episode "Ride the Wind" was combined into a full-length theatrical release and released internationally in 1967.

== Reception ==
Season seven held the #1 position in the Nielsen ratings. It was the second season of three straight seasons to hold that position.

=== Awards and nominations ===
Award	Year (Note: Indicates the year of ceremony.)	Category	Nominee(s) / Work	Result	Ref(s)
Primetime Creative Arts Emmy Awards	1966	Outstanding Dramatic Series	David Dortort (producer)	Nominated	
Primetime Creative Arts Emmy Awards	1966	Individual Achievements in Music—Composition	David Rose	Nominated	
Primetime Creative Arts Emmy Awards	1966	Individual Achievements in Cinematography—Cinematography	Haskell Boggs and William F. Whitley	Nominated	
Primetime Creative Arts Emmy Awards	1966	Individual Achievements in Cinematography—Special	Edward Ancona (color coordinator)	Nominated	
Primetime Creative Arts Emmy Awards	1966	Individual Achievements in Film Editing	Marvin Coil, Everett Douglas and Ellsworth Hoagland	Won	
