= Kate Bliss and the Ticker Tape Kid =

- Print advertisement
- Genre: Comedy; Western
- Written by: William Bowers
- Directed by: Burt Kennedy
- Starring: Suzanne Pleshette; Don Meredith; Harry Morgan; David Huddleston; Tony Randall
- Music by: Jeff Alexander
- Country of origin: United States
- Original language: English

Production
- Executive producers: Aaron Spelling; Douglas S. Cramer
- Producer: Richard E. Lyons
- Cinematography: Lamar Boren
- Editor: Jack Harnish
- Running time: 90 minutes
- Production company: Aaron Spelling Productions

Original release
- Network: ABC
- Release: May 26, 1978

Kate Bliss and the Ticker Tape Kid is a 1978 American made-for-television comedy Western film. It was written by William Bowers and directed by Burt Kennedy.

== Cast ==
- Suzanne Pleshette as Kate Bliss
- Don Meredith as Clint Allison
- Harry Morgan as Hugo Peavey
- David Huddleston as Sheriff
- Tony Randall as Lord Seymour Devery
- Burgess Meredith as William Blackstone
- Buck Taylor as Joe
- Jerry Hardin as Bud Dozier
- Gene Evans as Fred Williker
- Harry Carey Jr. as Deputy Luke
- Alice Hirson as Beth Dozier
- Don Collier as Tim
- Don 'Red' Barry as Devery's Foreman
- Richard Herd as Donovan

== Reception ==
The Los Angeles Times called it "pure bliss".
