= The Canadians (1961 film) =

1961 film by Burt Kennedy

- Movie poster
- Directed by: Burt Kennedy
- Written by: Burt Kennedy
- Produced by: Herman E. Webber
- Starring: Robert Ryan; John Dehner; Torin Thatcher
- Cinematography: Arthur Ibbetson
- Edited by: Douglas Robertson
- Music by: Douglas Gamley
- Production company: Associated Producers
- Distributed by: 20th Century-Fox
- Release date: 11 March 1961
- Running time: 85 minutes
- Countries: United Kingdom; Canada
- Language: English

The Canadians is a 1961 Anglo–Canadian CinemaScope Western film written and directed by Burt Kennedy. It starred Robert Ryan, John Dehner and Torin Thatcher.

It was Kennedy's directorial debut. He later called it "a disaster" and "a terrible thing".

== Plot ==
A group of Sioux come to shelter in Canada from the Indian wars in the United States following Custer's last stand at the Battle of the Little Bighorn. They are given permission to remain by the Canadian government represented by three Mounties. Indian-fighters from Montana searching for 40 stolen horses discover the Sioux settlement and mistakenly assume their horses are theirs. In the white men's surprise attack they murder many Indians, steal many horses, and kidnap an integrated white young woman recognized as having been kidnapped in a raid years earlier. The Mounties promise justice, track, capture, and begin the week-long ride to a trial at court. During the week tables turn back and forth, backstories shared, some discussion about American gun culture and violence, and the woman is killed. Eventually the men are lured to what may be their lost horses but a stampede erupts and the Sioux manage to drive the white men over the cliff like buffaloes to their death. Without a shot fired and the deal maintained the Sioux remain in Canada while the Mounties return to their fort where the senior will finally retire.

In response the North-West Mounted Police are formed, the forerunner to the Royal Canadian Mounted Police.

== Cast ==
- Robert Ryan as Inspector William Gannon
- John Dehner as Frank Boone
- Torin Thatcher as Sgt. McGregor
- Burt Metcalfe as Constable Springer
- John Sutton as Superintendent Walker
- Jack Creley as Greer
- Scott Peters as Ben
- Richard Alden as Billy
- Teresa Stratas as White woman
- Michael Pate as Chief Four Horns

== Production ==
The film was the directorial debut of Burt Kennedy, who had established himself by the late 1950s as one of the leading writers of Westerns. It was originally called Royal Canadian Mounted.

Kennedy later recalled, "I didn't know what I was doing. I remember the first shot had like 400 horses in it, and I got the shot and the cameraman said, 'What do we do now?' And I thought, 'You mean I gotta do more?' So that's the reason I went into television [after The Canadians] to find out how you shoot pictures."

He also said "I had a wonderful cameraman... it was beautiful country... the story was pretty good actually, because it was based on an actual event, but – I was so used to playing scenes in Randy [Randolph Scott] pictures, I thought I could get away with them. But I couldn't. You can play good scenes with bad actors and (they're going to be) bad scenes. So I trapped myself... [Robert Ryan looked] like he didn't know what he was doing. It wasn't his fault. He was so grim in it. And the picture was so grim."
