= Where the Hell's That Gold? =

1988 TV film

- VHS cover under the different title
- Also known as: Dynamite and Gold
- Genre: Western
- Written by: Burt Kennedy
- Directed by: Burt Kennedy
- Starring: Willie Nelson; Jack Elam; Delta Burke; Alfonso Arau; Gerald McRaney; Annabelle Gurwitch
- Music by: Arthur B. Rubinstein
- Country of origin: United States
- Original language: English

Production
- Executive producers: Frank Konigsberg; Larry Sanitsky
- Producer: Burt Kennedy
- Production locations: Cumbres & Toltec Scenic Railroad, Chama, New Mexico; Eaves Movie Ranch - 105 Rancho Alegre Road, Santa Fe, New Mexico
- Cinematography: John Elsenbach
- Editor: Warner E. Leighton
- Running time: 91 minutes
- Production companies: Brigade Productions; Konigsberg/Sanitsky Company

Original release
- Network: CBS
- Release: November 13, 1988

Where the Hell's That Gold? (stylized as Where the Hell's That Gold?!!?) is a 1988 American Western television film written, directed and produced by Burt Kennedy and starring Willie Nelson, Jack Elam and Delta Burke. It was broadcast on the CBS Sunday Movie on November 13, 1988.

== Premise ==
In 1895, outlaws Cross and Boone (Willie Nelson and Jack Elam) and Cross's moll Germany (Delta Burke) scrounge for a hidden fortune in stolen gold, fending off other outlaw gangs, Mexican revolutionaries, Indians and Wells Fargo Agents.

== Cast ==
- Willie Nelson as Cross
- Delta Burke as Germany
- Jack Elam as Boone
- Alfonso Arau as Indio
- Gerald McRaney as Jones
- Annabelle Gurwitch as Jesse

== Home video release ==
- The film was released on videocassette under the alternate title of Dynamite and Gold.
- On December 26, 2006, it was released on DVD and restored back to its original title.
