= Suzanne Pleshette =

American actress (1937–2008)

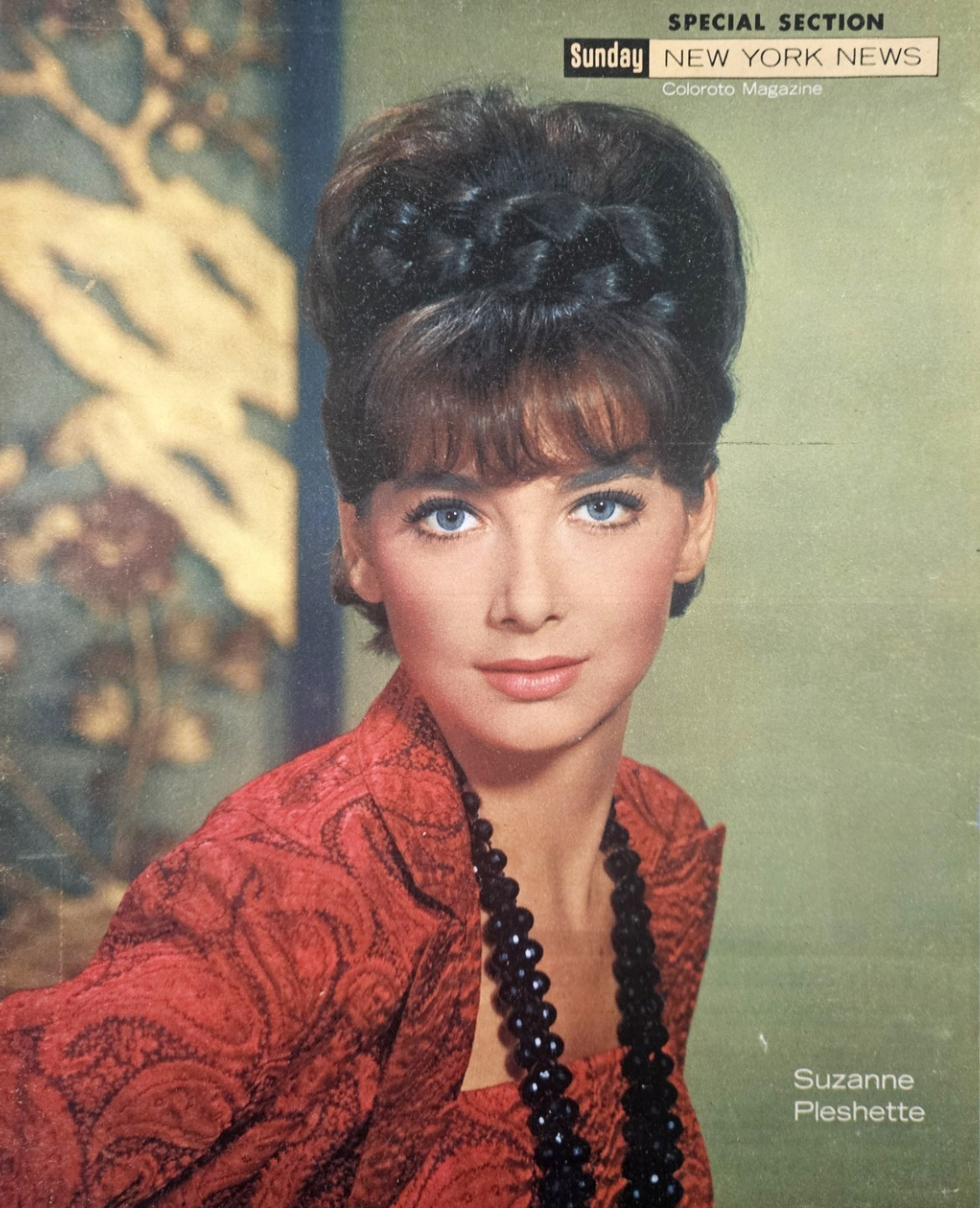
- Pleshette in 1963
- Born: January 31, 1937; New York City, U.S.
- Died: January 19, 2008 (aged 70); Los Angeles, California, U.S.
- Resting place: Hillside Memorial Park Cemetery
- Education: Finch College; Neighborhood Playhouse School of the Theatre
- Occupation: Actress
- Years active: 1957–2004
- Known for: The Bob Newhart Show; The Birds; Rome Adventure; Support Your Local Gunfighter; Hot Stuff
- Spouses: Troy Donahue (m. 1964; div. 1964); Tommy Gallagher (m. 1968; died 2000); Tom Poston (m. 2001; died 2007)
- Relatives: John Pleshette (cousin)

Suzanne Pleshette (January 31, 1937 – January 19, 2008) was an American actress known for her roles in theatre, film, and television. She was nominated for three Emmy Awards and two Golden Globe Awards. For her role as Emily Hartley on the CBS sitcom The Bob Newhart Show (1972–1978), she received two nominations for the Primetime Emmy Award for Outstanding Lead Actress in a Comedy Series.

Pleshette started her career in the theatre before gaining attention for her role in Alfred Hitchcock's horror-thriller The Birds (1963), a turn which earned her a Laurel Award. Her other notable film roles include Rome Adventure (1962), Support Your Local Gunfighter (1971), and Hot Stuff (1979). For her portrayal of Leona Helmsley in Leona Helmsley: The Queen of Mean (1990), she received nominations for the Primetime Emmy Award and Golden Globe Award for Best Actress in a Miniseries or Movie. She later voiced roles in The Lion King II: Simba's Pride (1998) and Spirited Away (2001).

== Early life ==
Suzanne Pleshette was born on January 31, 1937, in the New York City borough of Brooklyn, to Geraldine (née Kaplan) and Eugene Pleshette. Her parents were Jewish, the children of immigrants from Russia and Austria-Hungary. Her mother was a dancer and artist who performed under the stage name Geraldine Rivers. Her father was a stage manager of the Paramount Theater in Manhattan and of the Paramount Theater in Brooklyn, and later, a network executive. She graduated from Manhattan's High School of Performing Arts and attended Syracuse University for one semester, then transferred to Finch College. She later graduated from the Neighborhood Playhouse School of the Theatre in Manhattan and was under the tutelage of acting teacher Sanford Meisner.

== Career ==
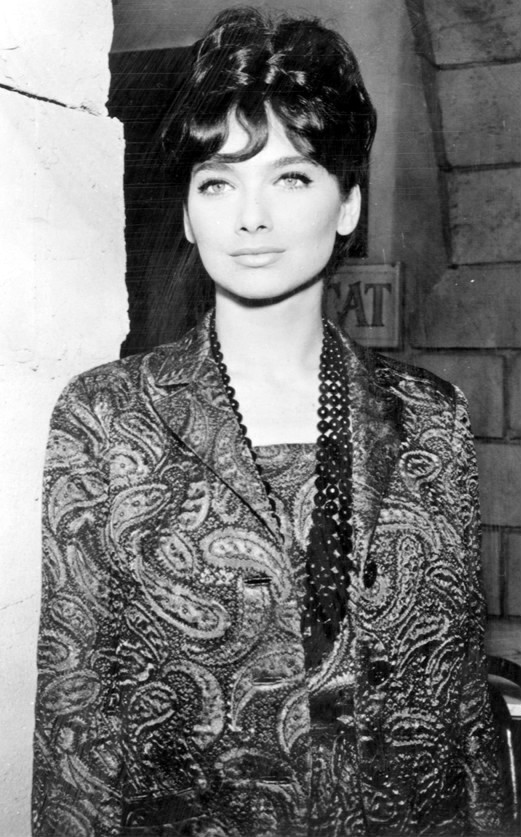
Publicity photo of Pleshette from the television program The Contenders c. 1963

The Boston Globe described her appearance and demeanor as sardonic and her voice as sultry. Pleshette began her career at age 20 as a stage actress. She made her Broadway debut in Meyer Levin's 1957 play Compulsion, adapted from his novel inspired by the Leopold and Loeb case. The following year, she performed in the debut of The Cold Wind and the Warm by S. N. Behrman at the Shubert Theatre in New Haven, Connecticut, directed by Harold Clurman and produced by Robert Whitehead. In 1959, she was featured in the comedy Golden Fleecing, starring Constance Ford and Tom Poston. (Poston would eventually become her third husband.) That same year, she was one of two finalists for the role of Louise/Gypsy in the original production of Gypsy. During the run of The Cold Wind and the Warm, she spent mornings taking striptease lessons from Jerome Robbins for the role in Gypsy. In his autobiography, Arthur Laurents, the play's author, stated, "It came down to between Suzanne Pleshette and Sandra Church. Suzanne was the better actress, but Sandra was the better singer. We went with Sandra." In February 1961, she succeeded Anne Bancroft as Anne Sullivan Macy opposite 14-year-old Patty Duke's Helen Keller in The Miracle Worker.

Her early screen credits include The Geisha Boy (1958), Rome Adventure (1962), Fate Is the Hunter (1964), and Youngblood Hawke (1964), but she was best known at that time for her role in Alfred Hitchcock's suspense film The Birds (1963). Immediately following The Birds, Pleshette was cast in 40 Pounds of Trouble (1962), a comedy film co-starring Tony Curtis and Phil Silvers, which Curtis was producing through his own film production company, Curtis Enterprises. The movie 40 Pounds of Trouble was the first motion picture ever filmed at Disneyland, and was distributed by Universal-International Pictures in late 1962. She worked with Steve McQueen in the 1966 western drama film Nevada Smith, was nominated for a Laurel Award for her starring performance in the comedy If It's Tuesday, This Must Be Belgium opposite Ian McShane, and co-starred with James Garner in a pair of films, Support Your Local Gunfighter (1971) and the drama Mister Buddwing (1966).

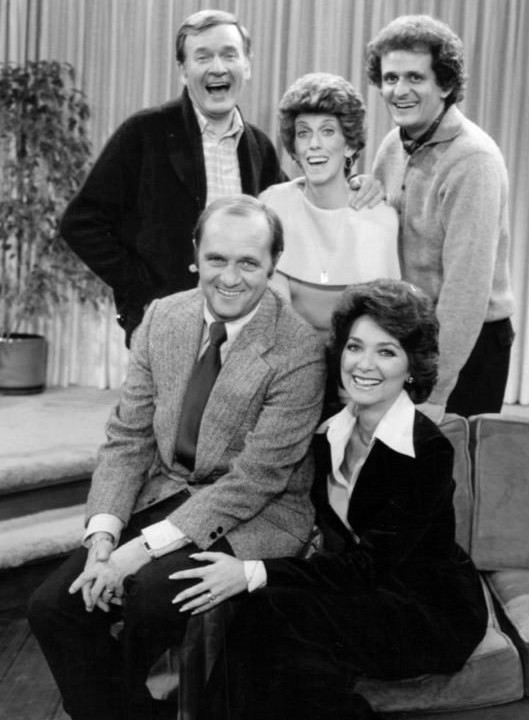
(L to R): Bill Daily, Bob Newhart, Marcia Wallace, Pleshette, and Peter Bonerz in The Bob Newhart Show

Pleshette's first television role was in the episode "Night Rescue" (December 5, 1957) of the CBS adventure/drama television series Harbormaster, starring Barry Sullivan and Paul Burke. Her other early television appearances include Playhouse 90, Decoy, Have Gun – Will Travel, One Step Beyond, Riverboat, Alfred Hitchcock Presents, The Tab Hunter Show, Channing, Ben Casey, Naked City, Gunsmoke, Wagon Train, the pilot episode of The Wild Wild West, and Dr. Kildare, for which she was nominated for her first Emmy Award. She guest-starred more than once as different characters in each of the following 1960s TV series: Route 66, The Fugitive, The Invaders, The F.B.I., Columbo ("Dead Weight") (1971), and The Name of the Game.

Her 1970 game show appearances include It Takes Two, with her husband, and Name Droppers. On August 5, 1971, TV producers saw her on The Tonight Show Starring Johnny Carson and noticed a certain chemistry between Suzanne and fellow guest Bob Newhart. She was cast as the wife of Newhart's character on the CBS sitcom The Bob Newhart Show (1972–1978) for all six seasons, as part of CBS television's Saturday-night lineup. During this time, she was nominated twice for the Primetime Emmy Award for Outstanding Lead Actress in a Comedy Series. She reprised her role of Emily Hartley in the final episode of Newhart's subsequent comedy series, Newhart, in which viewers discovered that the entire later series had been her husband Bob's dream when he awakens next to her in the bedroom set from the earlier series.

During this time, she starred in films such as the Western comedy Support Your Local Gunfighter (1971) starring James Garner. She also appeared in a number of Walt Disney family films, most notably The Adventures of Bullwhip Griffin (1967), opposite Roddy McDowall, Blackbeard's Ghost (1968) starring Peter Ustinov and Dean Jones and The Shaggy D.A. (1976) with Jones and Tim Conway.

She was the lead actress in the comedies Hot Stuff (1979) opposite Dom DeLuise and Ossie Davis and Oh, God! Book II (1980) starring George Burns. Her 1984 situation comedy, Suzanne Pleshette Is Maggie Briggs, was canceled after seven episodes. In 1989, she played the role of Christine Broderick in the NBC drama, Nightingales, which lasted one season. In 1990, Pleshette portrayed Manhattan hotelier Leona Helmsley in the television movie Leona Helmsley: The Queen of Mean, which garnered her nominations for the Primetime Emmy Award for Outstanding Lead Actress in a Limited or Anthology Series or Movie and the Golden Globe Award for Best Actress – Miniseries or Television Film.

In addition, she starred opposite Hal Linden in the 1994 sitcom The Boys Are Back. She had a starring role in Good Morning, Miami, as Mark Feuerstein's grandmother Claire Arnold in season one and played the mother of Katey Sagal's character in the ABC sitcom 8 Simple Rules for Dating My Teenage Daughter following John Ritter's death. Pleshette provided the voices of Yubaba and Zeniba in the English dub of Japanese director Hayao Miyazaki's Academy Award-winning film Spirited Away and the voice of Zira in Disney's direct-to-video film The Lion King II: Simba's Pride in 1998 (replacing Kathleen Turner) and sang the song "My Lullaby". In her last role, she appeared as the estranged mother of Megan Mullally's character Karen Walker in three episodes of the NBC sitcom Will & Grace.

== Personal life ==
Pleshette wrote screenplays under a pen name. She also wrote poems, with some recited on The Tonight Show with Johnny Carson.

Suzanne Pleshette was the cousin of the actor John Pleshette.

Madlyn Rhue was her "oldest friend".

Pleshette appears in beach home movies filmed by Roddy McDowall in 1965.

=== Marriages ===
Pleshette's 1964 marriage to her Rome Adventure and A Distant Trumpet co-star Troy Donahue ended in divorce after six months. She dated actors Dean Stockwell and David Janssen.

Her second husband was oilman Thomas "Tommy" Joseph Gallagher III (born January 28, 1934, in Galveston, Texas, to Thomas Joseph Gallagher Jr., and Toy Fay née Rice), to whom she was married from March 16, 1968, to his death on January 21, 2000. He survived lung cancer, and later died of E. coli. She suffered a miscarriage during her marriage to Gallagher, and they were childless. Asked about children in an October 2000 interview, Pleshette stated: "I certainly would have liked to have had Tommy's children. But my nurturing instincts are fulfilled in other ways. I have a large extended family; I'm the mother on every set. So if this is my particular karma, that's fine."

In 2001, Pleshette married fellow actor Tom Poston, who had been a recurring guest star on The Bob Newhart Show in the 1970s and a Newhart cast member. Long before they worked together on television, though, Poston and Pleshette had been involved romantically in 1959, when they acted together in the Broadway comedy Golden Fleecing. During the subsequent 40 years, they married others, but remained friends. After they were both widowed, the deaths of their spouses brought Poston and Pleshette together again, and they married in 2001. They remained married until his death from respiratory failure in Los Angeles on April 30, 2007.

Gallagher, Pleshette, and Poston are all interred close to each other in the Jewish Hillside Memorial Park Cemetery.

=== Designer ===
From 1969 to 1980, Pleshette and Harriet Rosalind Dolin Stuart designed sheets for J.P. Stevens & Co.

== Illness and death ==
Pleshette was a smoker until her 1998 cancer scare whereupon she quit. She made her last public appearance with the Bob Newhart Show cast at The Bob Newhart Show 35th Anniversary Reunion at PaleyLive LA, held on September 5, 2007 at the Paley Center for Media in Beverly Hills. She died January 19, 2008.

On August 11, 2006, Pleshette's agent Joel Dean announced that she was being treated for lung cancer at Cedars-Sinai Medical Center. Three days later, The Herald-Palladium reported that Dean said the cancer was the size of "a grain of sand" when it was found during a routine X-ray, that the cancer was "caught very much in time", that she was receiving chemotherapy as an outpatient and that Pleshette was "in good spirits".

She was later hospitalized for a pulmonary infection and developed pneumonia, which caused her to remain in the hospital for an extended period of time. She arrived at a Bob Newhart Show cast reunion in September 2007 in a wheelchair, which raised concern about her health, although she insisted that she was "cancer-free". (She was seated in a regular chair during the actual telecast.) During an interview in USA Today given at the time of the reunion, Pleshette stated that she had been released four days earlier from the hospital where, as part of her cancer treatment, part of one of her lungs had been removed.

Pleshette died on January 19, 2008, in her Los Angeles home, aged 70. She is buried close to her third husband, Tom Poston (who died the previous year), in the Hillside Memorial Park Cemetery in Culver City, California. She received a star on the Hollywood Walk of Fame for Television on January 31, 2008, the walk's 2,355th star, which was placed (at her request) in front of Frederick's of Hollywood. Bob Newhart, Arte Johnson, and Marcia Wallace spoke at the star's unveiling, which had been planned before Pleshette's death. Tina Sinatra accepted the star on Pleshette's behalf.

== Filmography ==
=== Films ===
Year	Title	Role	Notes
1958	The Geisha Boy	Sgt. Betty Pearson	First feature film
1962	Rome Adventure	Prudence Bell	
1962	40 Pounds of Trouble	Chris Lockwood	
1963	The Birds	Annie Hayworth	
1963	Wall of Noise	Laura Rubio	
1964	A Distant Trumpet	Kitty Mainwarring	
1964	Fate Is the Hunter	Martha Webster	
1964	Youngblood Hawke	Jeanne Greene	
1965	A Rage to Live	Grace Caldwell Tate	
1966	The Ugly Dachshund	Fran Garrison	
1966	Nevada Smith	Pilar	
1966	Mister Buddwing	Fiddle Corwin	
1967	The Adventures of Bullwhip Griffin	Arabella Flagg	
1968	Blackbeard's Ghost	Jo-Anne Baker	
1968	The Power	Professor Margery Lansing	
1969	If It's Tuesday, This Must Be Belgium	Samantha Perkins	
1969	Target: Harry	Diane Reed	
1970	Suppose They Gave a War and Nobody Came?	Ramona	
1971	Support Your Local Gunfighter	Patience	
1976	The Shaggy D.A.	Betty Daniels	
1979	Hot Stuff	Louise Webster	
1980	Oh, God! Book II	Paula Richards	
1980	Arch of Triumph	Joan Madou	Never completed. Also filmed in 1948 and 1984.
1998	The Lion King II: Simba's Pride	Zira	Voice; direct-to-video
2001	Spirited Away	Yubaba/Zeniba	Voice, 2002 English dub Final film role.

=== Television ===
Year	Title	Role	Notes
1958	Decoy	Wendy Jenkins	Episode: " The Sound of Tears"
1958	Have Gun-Will Travel	Maria	Episode: "Death of a Gun Fighter"
1959	Summer of Decision	Susan	Television movie
1959	Adventures in Paradise	Minette	Episode: "The Lady from South Chicago"
1959	One Step Beyond	Martha Wizinski	Episode: "Delusion"
1960	Alfred Hitchcock Presents	Anne Underhill	Season 5, Episode 21: "Hitch Hike"
1960	Riverboat	Marie Tourette	Episode: "The Two Faces of Grey Holden"
1960	Naked City	Nora Condon	Episode: "The Pedigree Sheet"
1960	The Islanders	Iris	Episode: "Forbidden Cargo"
1960	Route 66	Various	2 episodes
1961	Hong Kong	Diane Dooley	Episode: "Lesson in Fear"
1961–64	Dr. Kildare	Various	3 episodes
1962	Target: The Corruptors	Hank	2 episodes
1962	Alcoa Premiere	Carla Hammond	Episode: "The Contenders"
1963	Wagon Train	Myra Marshall	Episode: "The Myra Marshall Story"
1963	The Fugitive	Ellie Burnett / Peggy Franklyn	2 episodes
1965	The Wild Wild West	Lydia Monteran	Episode: "Night of the Inferno"
1967	Wings of Fire	Kitty Sanborn	Television Movie
1967–68	The Invaders	Vikki / Anne Gibbs	2 episodes
1968	It Takes a Thief	Angela	Episode: "A Sour Note"
1968	Flesh and Blood	Nona	Television movie
1970	Gunsmoke	Glory Bramley	Episode: "Stark"
1970	Marcus Welby, M.D.	Ann Logan	Episode: "Daisy in the Shadows"
1970	The Courtship of Eddie's Father	Valerie Bessinger	Episode: "Hello, Miss Bessinger, Goodbye"
1970	Along Came a Spider	Anne Banning / Janet Furie	Television movie
1970	Hunters Are for Killing	Barbara Soline	Television movie
1971	River of Gold	Anna	Television movie
1971	In Broad Daylight	Kate Todd	Television movie
1971	Columbo	Helen Stewart	Episode: "Dead Weight"
1971	Ironside	Shelly Kingman	Episode: "But When She Was Bad"
1972	Bonanza	Performer	Episode: "A Place to Hide"
1972–78	The Bob Newhart Show	Emily Hartley	Main; 142 episodes
1975	The Legend of Valentino	June Mathis	Television movie
1976	Law and Order	Karen Day	Television movie
1976	Richie Brockelman: The Missing 24 Hours	Elizabeth Morton	Television movie
1978	Kate Bliss and the Ticker Tape Kid	Kate Bliss	Television movie
1979	Flesh & Blood	Kate Fallon	Television movie
1980	If Things Were Different	Janet Langford	Television movie
1981	The Star Maker	Margot Murray	Television movie
1982	Help Wanted: Male	Laura Bingham	Television movie
1982	Fantasies	Carla Webber	Television movie
1983	Dixie: Changing Habits	Dixie Cabot	Television movie
1983	One Cooks, the Other Doesn't	Joanne Boone	Television movie
1984	For Love or Money	Joanna Piper	Television movie
1984	Maggie Briggs	Maggie Briggs	6 episodes
1985	Kojak	Dana Sutton	Episode: "The Belarus File"
1985	Bridges to Cross	Tracy Bridges	6 episodes
1985	The Belarus File	Dana Sutton	Television movie
1987	A Stranger Waits	Kate Bennington	Television movie
1988	Alone in the Neon Jungle	Captain Janet Hamilton	Television movie
1989	Nightingales	Christine Broderick	13 episodes
1990	Newhart	Emily Hartley	Episode: "The Last Newhart"
1990	Leona Helmsley: The Queen of Mean	Leona Helmsley	Television movie
1992	Battling for Baby	Marie Peters	Television movie
1993	A Twist of the Knife	Dr. Rachel Walters	Television movie
1994–95	The Boys Are Back	Jackie Hansen	18 episodes
1996–97	The Single Guy	Sarah Eliot	3 episodes
2002–03	Good Morning, Miami	Claire Arnold	14 episodes
2002–04	Will and Grace	Lois Whitley	3 episodes Final role
2003	8 Simple Rules	Laura	3 episodes

=== Theatre ===
Year	Title	Role	Venue
1957	Compulsion	Fourth Girl	Ambassador Theatre, Broadway
1958	The Cold Wind And The Warm	Leah	Morosco Theatre, Broadway
1958	Golden Fleecing	Julie	Henry Miller's Theatre, Broadway
1959	The Miracle Worker	Annie Sullivan	Playhouse Theatre, Broadway
1982	Special Occasions	Amy Ruskin	Music Box Theatre, Broadway

== Awards and nominations ==
Year	Association	Category	Project	Result	Ref.
1977	Primetime Emmy Award	Outstanding Lead Actress in a Comedy Series	The Bob Newhart Show	Nominated	
1978	Primetime Emmy Award	Outstanding Lead Actress in a Comedy Series	The Bob Newhart Show	Nominated	
1990	Primetime Emmy Award	Outstanding Lead Actress in a Miniseries or Movie	Leona Helmsley: The Queen of Mean	Nominated	
1963	Golden Globe Award	Best New Star of the Year – Actress	The Birds	Nominated	
1990	Golden Globe Award	Best Actress in a Miniseries or Television Movie	Leona Helmsley: The Queen of Mean	Nominated	
1963	Laurel Award	Top New Female Personality	The Birds	Won	
1969	Laurel Award	Female Comedy Performance	If It's Tuesday, This Must Be Belgium	Nominated	
1998	Annie Awards	Outstanding Individual Achievement for Voice Acting	The Lion King II: Simba's Pride	Nominated	
