= Skin Game =

1971 film by Gordon Douglas, Paul Bogart

- Theatrical release poster
- Directed by: Paul Bogart; Gordon Douglas (uncredited)
- Screenplay by: Peter Stone (credited as "Pierre Marton")
- Story by: Richard Alan Simmons
- Produced by: Harry Keller
- Starring: James Garner; Lou Gossett; Susan Clark; Brenda Sykes; Ed Asner; Andrew Duggan
- Cinematography: Fred J. Koenekamp
- Edited by: Walter Thompson
- Music by: David Shire
- Distributed by: Warner Bros.
- Release date: September 30, 1971
- Running time: 102 minutes
- Country: United States
- Language: English

Skin Game is a 1971 American western comedy film directed by Paul Bogart and Gordon Douglas, and starring James Garner and Lou Gossett. The supporting cast features Susan Clark, Ed Asner, Andrew Duggan, Parley Baer and Royal Dano.

== Plot ==
Partners Quincy Drew, a white con-man, and Jason O'Rourke, a black man who was born free and is well-educated, travel from town to town in Missouri and Kansas during the late slavery era. They had first met when Quincy sold Jason a horse that had been stolen from the local sheriff. They meet again in jail after pulling various con jobs, and work out a new con in which Quincy claims to be a down-on-his-luck slave-owner who is selling his last slave. Quincy then gets the bidding rolling, and sells Jason, who quickly escapes from his new owner, after which the two meet to split the profits. The con is complicated when Jason is sold to a savvy slave trader who is intent on taking him farther south to make a profit.

== Cast ==
- James Garner as Quincy Drew / Captain Nathaniel Mountjoy
- Lou Gossett as Jason O'Rourke
- Susan Clark as Ginger / Miss Abigail Blodgett
- Brenda Sykes as Naomi, Slave
- Edward Asner as Plunkett (runaway slave hunter)
- Andrew Duggan as Howard Calloway, Plantation Owner
- Henry Jones as Sam Cutler, Slave Buyer In Fair Shake
- Neva Patterson as Mrs. Claggart
- Parley Baer as Mr. Claggart
- George Tyne as Henry P. Bonner, Man Who Bought Jason In Dirty Shame
- Royal Dano as John Brown, Abolitionist
- Pat O'Malley as William, Slave Buyer In Fair Shake
- Jason Wingreen as 2nd Speaker
- Joel Fluellen as Uncle Abram, Head Slave At Calloway Manor
- Napoleon Whiting as Ned, Calloway Cook
- Juanita Moore as Viney, Calloway Slave
- Robert Foulk as Sheriff

== Production ==
In January 1966, Harry Keller, a producer at Universal Studios, announced he was developing the project based on a story by Richard Alan Simmons.

In March 1968, Peter Stone signed on to write the script. In October 1968, Universal announced the film for the following year.

In April 1969, Universal put the film on its slate for the following year. Keller would produce with Peter Stone, who wrote the script.

The film did not go ahead. By September 1970, Keller announced the film would be made by James Garner's Cherokee Productions, released through Warner Bros., with Burt Kennedy to direct. By December, Kennedy had dropped out and was replaced by Paul Bogart. Kennedy said he walked off the film when the producer started telling him where to put the camera. He said when he quit he was doing tests for the black lead with Lou Gossett and Cleavon Little.

In January 1971, Lou Gossett signed to co-star.

In March, Bogart fell ill with hepatitis, and Gordon Douglas took over directing for a period of filming.

Stone later claimed Garner radically changed the film's last third to give himself more screen time. These changes annoyed Stone, who used a pseudonym on the film.

Garner said it was "a funny movie if you don't mind jokes about slavery. Paul Bogart did a masterly job."

== Sequel ==
A sequel was made three years later as a television film called Sidekicks, with Larry Hagman playing Garner's role and Gossett reprising his part.

== See also ==
- List of films featuring slavery
