= Support Your Local Sheriff! =

1969 film by Burt Kennedy

- Theatrical release poster
- Directed by: Burt Kennedy
- Written by: William Bowers
- Produced by: William Bowers; Bill Finnegan
- Starring: James Garner; Joan Hackett; Walter Brennan; Harry Morgan; Jack Elam; Bruce Dern
- Cinematography: Harry Stradling Jr.
- Edited by: George W. Brooks
- Music by: Jeff Alexander
- Distributed by: United Artists
- Release date: March 26, 1969
- Running time: 92 minutes
- Country: United States
- Language: English
- Budget: $750,000
- Box office: $5 million (US/ Canada rentals)

Support Your Local Sheriff! is a 1969 American comedy Western film directed by Burt Kennedy and starring James Garner, Joan Hackett, and Walter Brennan. The supporting cast features Harry Morgan, Jack Elam, Bruce Dern, and Henry Jones. The picture was distributed by United Artists and produced by William Bowers (who also wrote the screenplay), and Bill Finnegan.

The film is a parody of a common Western trope - the selfless, rugged stranger who tames a lawless frontier town. Its title was derived from the popular 1960s campaign slogan "Support Your Local Police". (Note: When the director and screenwriter struggled with the original working title, The Sheriff, Garner came up with the new title after seeing a police poster.)

== Plot ==
The Old West town of Calendar in the Colorado Territory springs up almost overnight when clumsy, hotheaded Prudy Perkins notices gold in a freshly dug grave during a funeral. Her father, bumbling farmer Olly, becomes the first mayor, but soon the town is at the mercy of the corrupt Danby family, who force the prospectors to pay a toll to use the only road in or out of Calendar. There is no sheriff, as the few who have taken the job have been run out of town or killed.

Jason McCullough, a confident and exceptionally skilled gunfighter planning to emigrate to Australia, watches Joe Danby kill a man over a card game in the saloon. Needing money after Calendar's high prices leave him broke, McCullough takes the job of sheriff, impressing the mayor and council with his uncanny marksmanship. He breaks up a street brawl and becomes attracted to Prudy. McCullough arrests Joe and holds him in the town's unfinished jail.

McCullough acquires a reluctant deputy, Jake, who was previously the "town character". Joe's arrest infuriates his father, Pa Danby, who is unaccustomed to being challenged. After McCullough disarms and humiliates him in a failed intimidation attempt, Pa sends a string of hired guns to kill him, all of whom the sheriff handles easily. Meanwhile, McCullough enlists Jake's help in an unsuccessful attempt to prospect for gold, and spars romantically with Prudy. The Danbys try to tear the bars off the jail window with their horses, but are pulled off their mounts, before Jake chases them off with a shotgun.

A fed-up Pa enlists all of his relatives to ride into town and free his son. When the news reaches McCullough, he initially tells Prudy he intends to leave, but when she expresses her approval of this sensible idea, he declares it cowardly and announces he'll stay. Mayor Perkins persuades the townsfolk to vote against helping the sheriff, despite Prudy trying to convince them otherwise. Thus, the Danby clan rides in faced only by McCullough, Jake, and Prudy. After a lengthy but unproductive gunfight, McCullough bluffs his way to victory using Joe as a hostage and the old cannon mounted in the center of town. As the Danbys are marched off to jail, the supposedly unloaded cannon fires, smashing the local brothel and scattering the prostitutes and the councilmen they were servicing.

McCullough and Prudy become engaged. In a closing monologue, Jake breaks the film's fourth wall to directly inform the audience that after his wedding, McCullough went on to a long and prosperous career as the first governor of Colorado and never made it to Australia (although he reads about it a lot), while Jake takes his place as sheriff of Calendar and becomes "one of the most beloved characters in Western folklore".

== Cast ==
- James Garner as Jason McCullough
- Joan Hackett as Prudy Perkins
- Walter Brennan as Pa Danby
- Harry Morgan as Olly Perkins
- Jack Elam as Jake
- Henry Jones as Henry Jackson
- Bruce Dern as Joe Danby
- Willis Bouchey as Thomas Devery
- Kathleen Freeman as Mrs. Danvers
- Walter Burke as Fred Johnson
- Chubby Johnson as Brady
- Gene Evans as Tom Danby
- Dick Peabody as Luke Danby
- Dick Haynes as Bartender

== Production ==
Support Your Local Sheriff! was the first producing effort by Garner and his Cherokee Productions, completed on a shoestring budget of $750,000. It was based on an original script by Bill Bowers, who sold it to Garner for $150,000 plus a percentage of the profits. Bowers wanted to direct, but said Garner asked him not to. The writer recalled, "He talked me out of it by saying, 'Look, I've made five bad pictures in a row, and I really need a good picture, and I'd be scared to death to go with a new director. So why don't you produce this one?'"

During preproduction, Paramount Pictures threatened a lawsuit when the studio contended that the first scene was "lifted" from their Paint Your Wagon (1969), where a similar gold mine discovery is featured. Eventually, Garner was able to show where the original screenplay found its source material, and the lawsuit was dropped.

Bowers later said, "I should have directed it. Not that Burt (Kennedy) didn't do a perfectly good job, but it was my script and there were things in it that I would have gotten that he didn't get."

== Reception ==
According to Garner, Support Your Local Sheriff was initially considered a "bomb" and did not do much business in its first week, with United Artists threatening to pull the film. Garner challenged them to match his $10,000 stake to keep the film in one theatre for a week. The result was impressive: "Word of mouth" increased attendance until crowds were around the theatre by the end of the engagement. Support Your Local Sheriff was the 20th-most popular film at the U.S. box office in 1969.

Support Your Local Sheriff received mixed-to-positive critical reviews. It holds a 80% rating on Rotten Tomatoes based on 16 reviews.

In 1971, Bower estimated he would earn $500,000 on the film due to his percentage.

== Follow-up ==
In 1971, director Burt Kennedy reteamed with James Garner, Harry Morgan, and Jack Elam on another Western comedy, Support Your Local Gunfighter, with different characters, but a similar tone.

== See also ==
- List of American films of 1969
