= Kathleen Freeman =

American actress (1923–2001)

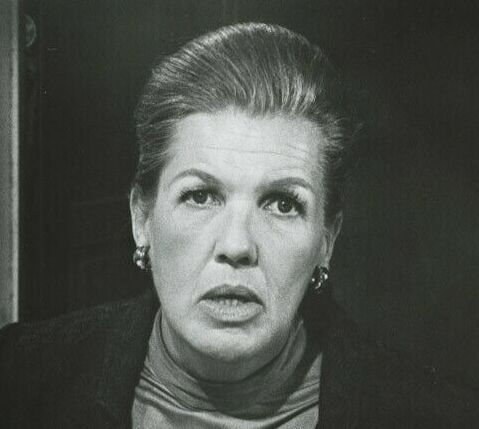
- Freeman in 1972
- Born: February 17, 1923; Chicago, Illinois, U.S.
- Died: August 23, 2001 (aged 78); New York City, U.S.
- Resting place: Hollywood Forever Cemetery
- Occupations: Actress; Voice actress
- Years active: 1925–2001
- Height: 5 ft 6 in (168 cm)

Kathleen Freeman (February 17, 1923 – August 23, 2001) was an American actress. In a career that spanned more than 50 years, she portrayed acerbic maids, secretaries, teachers, busybodies, nurses, and battle-axe neighbors and relatives, almost invariably to comic effect. In film, she is perhaps best remembered for appearing in 12 Jerry Lewis comedies in the 1950s and 1960s and The Blues Brothers (1980).

== Early life ==
Freeman was born on February 17, 1923 in Chicago, to Jessica Dixon, a soprano known as "The Overseas Girl" at the end of World War I, and Frank Freeman, known as "The Minstrel Man". Dixon entertained American troops in England, France, and post-war Germany, while Freeman headed Freeman's Forty Musical Minstrels in 1918. The couple married in 1922.

Freeman began her career at age 2, dancing in her parents' vaudeville act, Dixon and Freeman. She reported that eventually she "got caught" at around age 10, and then began attending school.

Freeman attended the University of California at Los Angeles, majored in music to be a classical pianist, "got in a play and got a laugh".

== Career ==
=== Stage ===
After college, Freeman joined the Circle Players on Santa Monica Boulevard.

"I became part of a theater group that came from UCLA, the Circle Players, which got to be at one point fairly internationally famous. And then we split off from that and started our own, Player's Ring and Gallery Theater." - Kathleen Freeman

Later in life she appeared in national tours of Deathtrap, Annie (as Miss Hannigan) and Woman of the Year with Lauren Bacall. She appeared on Broadway in The Full Monty. For her role as Jeannette Burmeister, the company's pianist, she was nominated for a 2001 Tony Award and won a Theatre World Award, which is usually given to younger performers. She died five days after giving her final performance in the show.

=== Television ===
In 1948, Peggy Webber saw Freeman on stage at the Circle Theatre, and hired her for Webber's live local series "Treasures of Literature", her first television job. From 1988 to 2001, Freeman appeared in more than 50 productions of the California Artists Radio Theatre, which records live performances of classic books and plays for KPCC (FM), KPFK NPR Playhouse, and National Public Radio, for Peggy Webber, the executive director.

In addition to teaching acting classes in the Los Angeles area, Freeman was a familiar presence on television. In 1958–59, she appeared three times on Buckskin, a children's program set in a hotel in a fictitious Montana town. She appeared from the 1950s until her death in regular or recurring roles on many sitcoms, including six episodes of The Bob Cummings Show (as Bertha Krause), Topper (as Katie the maid), and The Donna Reed Show (as Mrs. Celia Wilgus, the Stones' busybody next door neighbor). In 1964, she appeared in five episodes of The Lucy Show. Later, she was cast in a recurring role on Hogan's Heroes as Frau Gertrude Linkmeyer. In 1973, she had a co-starring role with Dom DeLuise in the sitcom Lotsa Luck (based on the British sitcom On the Buses).

She appeared in several episodes of Wagon Train, Funny Face (as Kate Harwell), I Dream of Jeannie (as a grouchy supervisor in a fantasy preview of Major Nelson's future, and later as a hillbilly), the short-lived prehistoric sitcom It's About Time (as Mrs. Boss), and as a nurse in Love, American Style.

Freeman played Sgt. Carter's mother in a 1969 episode of Gomer Pyle, U.S.M.C., as well as appearing as a different character in a 1968 episode of the same series. She also made multiple appearances on The Beverly Hillbillies as various characters.

She appeared as the voice of Peg Bundy's mom, an unseen character in several episodes of Married... with Children. She also appeared in episodes of Mama's Family, Growing Pains, Simon & Simon, ALF, L.A. Law, The Golden Girls, Doogie Howser, M.D., Roseanne, Coach, ER, Home Improvement, and many other shows in the 1980s and 1990s.

Besides her role in The Full Monty, she remained active in her final years with a regular voice role in As Told by Ginger, a voice bit in the animated feature film Shrek, and a guest appearance on the sitcom Becker. In her final episode of As Told by Ginger, "No Hope for Courtney", Freeman's character Mrs. Gordon retires from her teaching job. The script originally was written to have Gordon return to Lucky Elementary School, but Freeman died during production, so the episode was rewritten to have Gordon die as well and was dedicated in Freeman's memory.

=== Film ===
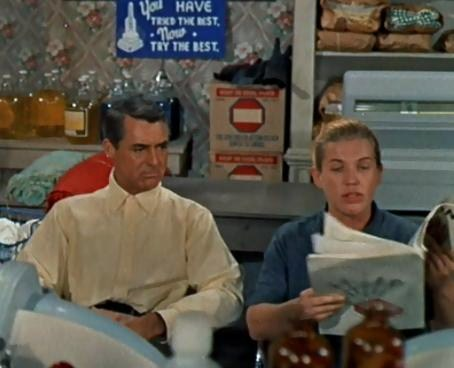
Cary Grant and Freeman (in uncredited role) as a laundromat gossip in Houseboat (1958)

For a short time in the early 1950s, Freeman was a Metro-Goldwyn-Mayer contract player, appearing mostly in small and uncredited bit parts. Her most notable early role was an uncredited part in the 1952 MGM musical Singin' in the Rain as Jean Hagen's diction coach Phoebe Dinsmore.

Beginning with the 1954 film 3 Ring Circus, Freeman became a favorite foil of Jerry Lewis, playing opposite him in 11 films. These included most of Lewis's better-known comedies, including The Disorderly Orderly as Nurse Higgins, The Errand Boy as the studio boss's wife, and The Nutty Professor as Millie Lemon. Over 30 years later, she made a brief appearance in Nutty Professor II: The Klumps.

Her other film roles included appearances in The Missouri Traveler (1958), The Fly (1958), the Western spoofs Support Your Local Sheriff! (1969) and Support Your Local Gunfighter (1971), and appearances in a spate of comedies in the 1980s and 1990s. Freeman played Sister Mary Stigmata (referred to as the Penguin) in John Landis' The Blues Brothers (1980) and Blues Brothers 2000 (1998). She also played a foul-mouthed apartment building manager in Dragnet (1987), a teacher in Hocus Pocus (1993), and a gangster mother in Naked Gun 33 1/3: The Final Insult (1994). She also had cameos in Joe Dante's Innerspace (1987) and Gremlins 2: The New Batch (1990) (as tipsy cooking host Microwave Marge). Her final film role was in Shrek (2001), where she played an old woman, Donkey's original owner, who tried selling him for money.

In the 1973 film The Sting, Freeman appeared in a family photo for Kid Twist’s character (played by Harold Gould) in the Western Union office scene.

== Personal life and death ==
Weakened by illness, Freeman was forced to withdraw from the Full Monty cast. Five days later, she died of lung cancer at age 78 at Lenox Hill Hospital. She was cremated and her ashes interred in a niche at Hollywood Forever Cemetery.

Freeman never married and had no children. The report of her death in the British newspaper The Guardian mentioned her "long-time companion Helen Ramsey"; Playbill's report referred to Ramsey as Freeman's "longtime and best friend", and similarly Variety called her Freeman's "best friend". Helen Ramsey and Freeman were University of California at Los Angeles students at the same time.

== Filmography ==
=== Film ===
Year	Title	Role	Notes
1948	The Naked City	Stout Girl on Elevated Train	Uncredited
1948	Casbah	American Woman	Uncredited
1948	The Saxon Charm	Nurse	Uncredited
1948	Behind Locked Doors	Nurse	Uncredited
1949	Mr. Belvedere Goes to College	Gwendolyn	Uncredited
1949	Annie Was a Wonder	Annie Swenson	Short film
1949	The Story of Molly X	Seamstress Con	Uncredited
1950	No Man of Her Own	Clara Larrimore	Uncredited
1950	The Secret Fury	Jury Member	Uncredited
1950	House by the River	Effie Ferguson, Party Guest	
1950	The Reformer and the Redhead	Lily Rayton Parker	
1950	Once a Thief	Phoebe	
1950	Lonely Heart Bandits	Bertha Martin	
1950	A Life of Her Own	Switchboard Operator, Betsy Ross Hotel	Uncredited
1950	The Second Face	Shirley	Uncredited
1951	The Company She Keeps	Jessie, Parolee with Child	Uncredited
1951	Cry Danger	Second Cigarette Clerk	Uncredited
1951	Cause for Alarm!	Woman	Uncredited
1951	A Place in the Sun	Factory Worker, Prosecution Witness	Uncredited
1951	Appointment with Danger	Nun	Uncredited
1951	Strictly Dishonorable	Silent Movie Organist	Uncredited
1951	Yes Sir, Mr. Bones	Chick Watts	Uncredited
1951	Behave Yourself!	Pet Shop Proprietor's Wife	Uncredited
1951	Come Fill the Cup	Lil, Newspaper Switchboard Operator	Uncredited
1951	Let's Make It Legal	Reporter	Uncredited
1951	The Wild Blue Yonder	Nurse Baxter	Uncredited
1952	The Greatest Show on Earth	Spectator	
1952	Love Is Better Than Ever	Mrs. Kahrney	
1952	Singin' in the Rain	Phoebe Dinsmore	Uncredited
1952	Talk About a Stranger	Rosa, Grocery Clerk	Uncredited
1952	Kid Monk Baroni	Maria Baroni	
1952	Skirts Ahoy!	Sarcastic Seamstress	Uncredited
1952	Wait 'til the Sun Shines, Nellie	The Burdges' Maid	Uncredited
1952	O. Henry's Full House	Mrs. Dorset	Uncredited; Segment: "The Ransom of Red Chief"
1952	Monkey Business	Mrs. Brannigan, Neighbor	Uncredited
1952	The Prisoner of Zenda	Gertrud Holf	Uncredited
1952	The Bad and the Beautiful	Miss March	Uncredited
1953	The Magnetic Monster	Nelly	
1953	She's Back on Broadway	Annie	Uncredited
1953	Confidentially Connie	Mother of Twins	Uncredited
1953	The Glass Wall	Zelda, Fat Woman	
1953	A Perilous Journey	Leah	
1953	Dream Wife	Chambermaid	Uncredited
1953	The Affairs of Dobie Gillis	'Happy Stella' Kowalski	
1953	Half a Hero	Welcomer	
1953	The Glass Web	Mrs. O'Halloran	Uncredited
1954	Battle of Rogue River	Sis Pringle	Uncredited
1954	The Far Country	Grits	
1954	Athena	Miss Seely	
1954	3 Ring Circus	Custard-Pie Gag Victim	Uncredited
1955	The Seven Year Itch	Woman at Vegetarian Restaurant	Uncredited
1955	Artists and Models	Mrs. Muldoon	Uncredited
1957	The Midnight Story	Rosa Cuneo	
1957	Pawnee	Mrs. Carter	
1957	Kiss Them for Me	Nurse Wilinski	Uncredited
1958	The Missouri Traveller	Serena Poole	
1958	Too Much, Too Soon	Miss Magruder	Uncredited
1958	The Fly	Emma	
1958	Houseboat	Laundromat Gossip	Uncredited
1958	The Buccaneer	Tina	
1960	North to Alaska	Lena Nordquist	
1961	Madison Avenue	Miss Thelma Haley	
1961	The Ladies Man	Katie	
1961	The Errand Boy	Mrs. Helen Paramutual / Mrs. T.P.	
1962	Wild Harvest	Goldie	
1963	The Nutty Professor	Millie Lemmon	
1963	Who's Minding the Store?	Mrs. Glucksman	
1964	Mail Order Bride	Sister Sue	
1964	The Patsy	Katie	Uncredited
1964	The Disorderly Orderly	Nurse Maggie Higgins	
1965	The Rounders	Agatha Moore	
1965	That Funny Feeling	Woman at Phone Booth	
1965	Marriage on the Rocks	Miss Blight	
1966	Three on a Couch	Murphy	
1967	The Big Mouth	Little Old Lady	Uncredited
1967	Point Blank	First Citizen	
1968	The Helicopter Spies	Mom	
1969	Support Your Local Sheriff!	Mrs. Danvers	
1969	Hook, Line & Sinker	Mrs. Hardtack, Baby Sitter	
1969	Death of a Gunfighter	Mary Elizabeth	
1969	The Good Guys and the Bad Guys	Mrs. Stone, Mother	
1969	Love American Style	Nurse	
1970	The Ballad of Cable Hogue	Mrs. Jensen	
1970	Myra Breckinridge	Bobby Dean Loner	
1970	Which Way to the Front?	Bland's Mother	
1971	Support Your Local Gunfighter!	Mrs. Perkins	
1971	Head On	Nadine	
1972	Stand Up and Be Counted	Sarah	
1972	Where Does It Hurt?	Mrs. Mazzini	
1972	The Unholy Rollers	Karen's Mother	
1973	Your Three Minutes Are Up	Mrs. Wilk	
1974	So Evil, My Sister	Hilda	
1975	The Strongest Man in the World	Officer Hurley	
1978	The Norseman	Old Indian Woman	
1980	The Blues Brothers	Sister Mary Stigmata, a.k.a. The Penguin	
1981	Heartbeeps	Helicopter Pilot	
1986	The Best of Times	Rosie	
1986	Inside Out	Mother	Voice
1986	The Malibu Bikini Shop	Loraine Bender	
1987	In the Mood	Beulah Marver	
1987	Dragnet	Enid Borden	
1987	Innerspace	Dream Lady	
1987	Teen Wolf Too	Admissions Lady	
1988	The Wrong Guys	Grunskis' Mom	
1989	Chances Are	Mrs. Handy	
1989	Little Nemo: Adventures in Slumberland	Dance Teacher	Voice
1989	The Princess and the Dwarf	Unknown	
1989	Hollywood Chaos	Unknown	
1990	Gremlins 2: The New Batch	Microwave Marge	
1990	The Willies	Miss Titmarsh	
1991	Joey Takes a Cab	Lola	
1991	Dutch	Gritzi	
1992	FernGully: The Last Rainforest	Elder #1	Voice
1993	Reckless Kelly	Mrs. Delance	
1993	Hocus Pocus	Miss Olin	
1994	Naked Gun 33 1/3: The Final Insult	Muriel	
1996	Two Guys Talkin' About Girls	Rhonda's Grandma	
1996	Candysack	Elderly Marilyn Monroe Impersonator	Voice, direct-to-video
1996	Carpool	Franklin's Mom	Voice
1997	Hercules	Heavyset Woman	Voice
1998	Blues Brothers 2000	Mother Mary Stigmata	
1998	Richie Rich's Christmas Wish	Miss Peabody	Direct-to-video
1998	I'll Be Home for Christmas	Tom Tom Girl Gloria	
1999	Baby Geniuses	Lenny's Noisy Neighbor	Uncredited
1999	Seven Girlfriends	Ms. Hargrove	
2000	Ready to Rumble	Jane King	
2000	Nutty Professor II: The Klumps	Denise's Nosy Neighbor	Uncredited
2001	Joe Dirt	Joe Dirt's Foster Mother	Uncredited
2001	Shrek	Old Woman	Voice; final film role

=== Television ===
Year(s)	Title	Role	Notes
1950–1954	Fireside Theatre	Mrs. Chernowitz	8 episodes
1952	Dragnet	Unknown	Episode: "The Big Death"
1952	Big Town	Unknown	Episode: "Marry My Past"
1952	I Married Joan	Customer in Dress Shop	Episode: "Birthday"
1952	Our Miss Brooks	Miss Atterberry	Episode: "The Embezzled Dress"
1952	Schlitz Playhouse	Ripplehissian Gang	Episode: "The Pussyfootin' Rocks"
1953	Cavalcade of America	Unknown	Episode: "The Indomitable Blacksmith"
1953	I Married Joan	Betty	2 episodes
1953	The Loretta Young Show	Freida Foss	Episode: "Girl on a Flagpole"
1953–1954	Topper	Katie	19 episodes
1954	Mr. & Mrs. North	Mary Farrell	Episode: "The Girl in Cell 13"
1954–1955	Mayor of the Town	Marilyn "Marilly" the Housekeeper	39 episodes
1954–1956	The Loretta Young Show	Jessie	3 episodes
1955	Lux Video Theatre	Connie	Episode: "Not All Your Tears"
1955	The George Burns and Gracie Allen Show	Helga	Episode: "Harry Morton's Cocktail Party"
1955–1956	Matinee Theatre	Village Shopkeeper	3 episodes
1955–1958	The Bob Cummings Show	Bertha Krause	6 episodes
1956	Father Knows Best	Fussy Woman	Uncredited; Episode: "The Bus to Nowhere"
1956	It's Always Jan	Mrs. Johnson	2 episodes
1956	Warner Bros. Presents	Unknown	Episode: "Strange World"
1956	The Loretta Young Show	Cousin Phemie	Episode: "His Inheritance"
1958	December Bride	Marie	Episode: "The Fred MacMurray Show"
1958	Tombstone Territory	Hannah Woolsey	Episode: "The Outcasts"
1958	Lassie	Mrs. Graff	Episode: "The Raffle"
1959	Wagon Train	Sairy Hogg	Episode: "The Kitty Angel Story"
1959	Lux Playhouse	Emma	Episode: "The Miss and Missiles"
1959–1962	General Electric Theatre	Girdle Woman	2 episodes
1959–1963	77 Sunset Strip	Hannah Wells / Mrs. Ryan / WAF Secretary / Mrs. Holmes	4 episodes
1959–1964	The Donna Reed Show	Mrs. Celia Wilgus	4 episodes
1960	Hawaiian Eye	Opal Jensen	Episode: "Then There Were Three"
1960	Bourbon Street Beat	Elsie	Episode: "Wagon Show"
1960	The Many Loves of Dobie Gillis	Mrs. Metzger	Episode: "Rock-A-Bye Dobie"
1960	The Case of the Dangerous Robin	Unknown	Episode: "The Nightmare"
1960–1961	Bachelor Father	Hilda	2 episodes
1961	Guestward Ho!	Mrs. Laughing Water	Episode: "The Hootons Versus Hawkeye"
1962	Margie	Mrs. Botts	Episode: "Flaming Youth"
1962	The Detectives	Betty	Episode: "Pandora's Box"
1962	Rawhide	Mrs. Beamish	Episode: "The Greedy Town"
1962	Wagon Train	Mrs. Benson	Episode: "The Caroline Casteel Story"
1962	Laramie	Edna Holtzhoff	Episode: "Justice in a Hurry"
1962	The Dick Powell Theatre	Unknown	Episode: "Pericles on 31st Street"
1962	87th Precinct	Miss Wilson	Episode: "Girl in the Case"
1962–1971	The Beverly Hillbillies	Mabel Johnson / Agnes / Flo Shaffer	6 episodes
1963	Arrest and Trial	Mrs. Hinch	Episode: "The Quality of Justice"
1963	The Alfred Hitchcock Hour	Mrs. McCleod	Episode: "You'll Be the Death of Me"
1964–1965	The Dick Van Dyke Show	Mrs. Campbell / Hotel Maid	2 episodes
1965	The Alfred Hitchcock Hour	Angela Morrow	Episode: "The World's Oldest Motive"
1966–1971	Hogan's Heroes	Gertrude Linkmeyer	4 episodes
1967	Dragnet	Mrs. Sunshine Pound	Episode: "The Gun"
1967–1970	Bonanza	Miss Hibbs / Ma Brinker	2 episodes
1968–1969	Gomer Pyle, U.S.M.C.	Alice Whipple / Mom	2 episodes
1969	The Bill Cosby Show	Eloise Parker	Episode: "A Word from Our Sponsor"
1973	The Mod Squad	Martha	Episode: "Cry Uncle"
1973–1974	Lotsa Luck	Iris Belmont	22 episodes
1975	The Daughters of Joshua Cabe Return	Essie	Television film
1975	Kolchak: The Night Stalker	Bella Sarkof	Episode: "The Youth Killer"
1976	Father O Father	Housekeeper	Television film
1977	Kojak	Ma Wonderly	Episode: "Case Without a File"
1977	ABC Weekend Special	Mrs. Stetson	Episode: "Soup and Me"
1978	Police Woman	Landlady	Episode: "Sons"
1980	CHiPs	Outraged Lady	Episode: "To Your Health"
1983	Sutter's Bay	Unknown	Television film
1985	AfterMASH	Mrs. Poulos	Episode: "Saturday's Heroes"
1985	Snorks	Additional Voices	Voice; Episode: "Snorkitis Is Nothing to Sneeze At/The Whole Toot and Nothing But..."
1985	Simon & Simon	Felix's Customer	Episode: "Facets"
1986	My Sister Sam	Mrs. Pink	Episode: "Patti's Party"
1987	Hunter	Ann Ridley	Episode: "Requiem for Sergeant McCall"
1987	Mama's Family	Big Joan McCall	Episode: "Mama with the Golden Arm"
1987	She's the Sheriff	Bessie	Episode: "Hildy Gets Shot"
1988	Bring Me the Head of Dobie Gillis	Marie	Television film
1988	The Facts of Life	Noreen Grisbee	2 episodes
1988	The Canterbury Ghost	Mrs. Umney	Voice, television film
1988	Glitz	Mrs. Magyk	Television film
1988	Simon & Simon	Stella Brunansky	Episode: "The Merry Adventures of Robert Hood"
1988	Murphy Brown	Mrs. Caldwell	Episode: "Respect"
1988	ALF	Betty Susla	Episode: "Alone Again, Naturally"
1988–1990	Growing Pains	Madge / Marge / Estelle / Sophie	5 episodes
1988–1990	The Hogan Family	Mother Poole	2 episodes
1989	L.A. Law	Joan Ackerman	Episode: "Izzy Ackerman or Is He Not"
1989	TV 101	Landlady	Episode: "First Love: Part 3"
1989	The Magical World of Disney	Mrs. Crackshell	Voice, episode: "Super DuckTales"
1989	Generations	Mrs. Brezinski	7 episodes
1989	Mr. Belvedere	Woman	Episode: "Fear of Flying"
1989	Christine Cromwell	Kathryn	Episode: "Things That Go Bump in the Night"
1989–1990	Head of the Class	Nurse	2 episodes
1989–1990	DuckTales	Mrs. Crackshell / Nurse Hatchet	Voice, 10 episodes
1990	Chip 'n Dale: Rescue Rangers	Ma	Voice, episode: "Short Order Crooks"
1990	A Family for Joe	Mrs. Lee	Episode: "Law and Order"
1990	Sydney	Louisa	Episode: "36-24-36"
1990	The Golden Girls	Mother Superior	Episode: "How Do You Solve a Problem Like Sophia?"
1991	The Munsters Today	Grandma	Episode: "A House Divided"
1991	Sons and Daughters	Debbie	Episode: "Deep Throat"
1991	Out of This World	Miss Ogilvy	Episode: "Educating Kyle"
1991	Tales from the Crypt	Mrs. Parker	Episode: "Loved to Death"
1991	Beverly Hills, 90210	Pawn Shop Clerk	Episode: "Anaconda"
1991	Matlock	Lucy Lewis	Episodes "The Witness Killings"
1991	MacGyver	Rose Magruta	Episode: "Off the Wall"
1992	Major Dad	Edna	Episode: "Close Encounters"
1992	Martin	Saleslady	Episode: "The Gift Rapper"
1992	Doogie Howser, M.D.	Mrs. Mickling	Episode: "The Patient in Spite of Himself"
1993	Chairman's Choice	Unknown	Television film
1993	Nurses	Sister Mary Alma	Episode: "Smokin' in the Boys' Room"
1993–1994	Phenom	Maureen De La Rosa	2 episodes
1994	Herman's Head	Mrs. Debusher	Episode: "Bedtime for Hermo"
1994	Party of Five	Mona	Episode: "Kiss Me Kate"
1995	The Mommies	Rona	Episode: "Enter Ken"
1995	Renegade	Felipe's Mother	Episode: "Most Wanted"
1995	Bless This Mess	Jimmy's Mother	Voice, episode: "The Postman Always Moves Twice"
1995	Married... with Children	Peg's Mom	Voice, 5 episodes
1996	Dave's World	Waitress	Episode: "Loves Me Like a Rock"
1996	Melrose Place	Madge	Episode: "The Circle of Strife"
1996	The Real Adventures of Jonny Quest	Mrs. Evans	Voice, episode: "Return of the Anasazi"
1996	Common Law	Danish Lady	Episode: "In the Matter of: Luis in Love"
1996	Roseanne	Seaweed Attendant / Edna	2 episodes
1996	ER	Rhonda's Patient	Episode: "No Brain, No Gain"
1996–1997	Duckman	Nurse	Voice, 2 episodes
1997	Coach	Magda	Episode: "The Stench of Death"
1998	Cow and Chicken	Greta	Voice, episode: "Sumo Cow"
1998	Night Man	Fern	Episode: "Bad to the Bone"
1998	Home Improvement	Gwen	Episode: "The Son Also Mooches"
1998	Love Boat: The Next Wave	Maw-Maw Cranston	Episode: "How Long Has This Been Going On?"
1998	Clueless	Pearl	Episode: "Cashless"
1999	Caroline in the City	Grandma Duffy	2 episodes
1999	Arli$$	Helen Krupp	Episode: "The Changing of the Guard"
1999	Providence	Miss Van Gundy	Episode: "The Third Thing"
1999	Grown Ups	Mona	Episode: "Online Romance"
1999–2000	Rugrats	Margaret, Woman	Voice, 2 episodes
1999–2000	Detention	Eugenia P. Kisskillya	Voice, 13 episodes
2000	Becker	Edith / Evelyn	Episode: "The Hypocratic Oath"
2000	Honey, I Shrunk the Kids: The TV Show	Community Center Cook	Episode: "Honey, I'm the Wrong Arm of the Law"
2000	Batman Beyond	Ma Mayhem	Voice, episode: "The Eggbaby"
2000–2002	As Told by Ginger	Mrs. Gordon	Voice, 13 episodes

=== Stage ===
Year	Title	Role	Notes
1948	The Adding Machine	Mrs. Zero	Coronet Theatre
1948	The Lady of Larkspur Lotion	Mrs. Wire	Carthay Circle Theatre
1948	Hindle Wakes	Mrs. Hawthorn	Carthay Circle Theatre
1949	Major Barbara	Lady Britomart Undershaft	Carthay Circle Theatre
1963	Bye Bye Birdie	Mae Peterson	Melodyland Christian Center
1964	Bye Bye Birdie	Mae Peterson	Santa Monica Civic Auditorium
1972	Cabaret	Fräulein Schneider	Union Plaza Hotel
1973	Funny Girl	Mrs. Rosie Brice	Union Plaza Hotel
1974	No, No, Nanette	Pauline	Dayton Memorial Hall
1974	No, No, Nanette	Pauline	Sacramento Music Circus
1978	13 Rue de L'Amour	Madame Spritzer	Circle in the Square Theatre, Broadway
1979	Deathtrap	Helga ten Dorp	National Tour
1980	Annie	Miss Hannigan	National Tour
1983	Woman of the Year	Helga (Replacement)	National Tour
2000	The Full Monty	Jeanette Burmeister	Eugene O'Neill Theatre, Broadway

=== Video game ===
Year	Title	Voice
1997	The Curse of Monkey Island	Madame Xima
