= Support Your Local Gunfighter =

1971 film

- Theatrical release poster
- Directed by: Burt Kennedy
- Written by: James Edward Grant; Burt Kennedy (uncredited)
- Produced by: Bill Finnegan; Burt Kennedy
- Starring: James Garner; Suzanne Pleshette; Harry Morgan; Jack Elam; John Dehner; Marie Windsor; Joan Blondell; Kathleen Freeman; Ellen Corby
- Cinematography: Harry Stradling Jr.
- Edited by: William B. Gulick
- Music by: Jack Elliot; Allyn Ferguson
- Distributed by: United Artists
- Release date: May 26, 1971
- Running time: 91 minutes
- Country: United States
- Language: English

Support Your Local Gunfighter is a 1971 American comic Western film directed by Burt Kennedy and starring James Garner and Suzanne Pleshette. The screenplay was originally written by James Edward Grant, who died in 1966; Kennedy rewrote it but let Grant keep sole credit. The picture shares many cast and crew members and plot elements with the earlier Support Your Local Sheriff! but is not a sequel. The supporting cast features Jack Elam, Harry Morgan, John Dehner, Marie Windsor, Dub Taylor, Joan Blondell and Ellen Corby.

Garner later wrote that the film was, "not as good as Support Your Local Sheriff".

== Plot ==
Latigo Smith, a gambler and confidence man, is traveling by train in frontier-era Colorado with the rich and powerful Goldie. Goldie wants desperately to marry him, a fate he wants to avoid. He hands the train's headwaiter a generous tip to assist him off the train without letting Goldie realize that he is fleeing. He sneaks off the train at Purgatory, a small mining town.

He discovers that two mining companies, run by bitter rivals Taylor Barton and Colonel Ames, are vying to find a "mother lode" of gold buried somewhere nearby. Dynamite blasts periodically rock the town to its foundations.

Latigo consults the town doctor about an embarrassing problem that is not immediately revealed, but turns out to be a large tattoo of Goldie on his chest. Latigo's great weakness is a periodic uncontrollable urge to bet on roulette; he soon loses all of his money playing his "lucky" number, 23. Penniless, he starts romancing local saloon keeper Miss Jenny. Being mistaken for infamous gunslinger "Swifty" Morgan gives Latigo an idea. He talks amiable ne'er-do-well Jug May into impersonating Swifty. Latigo attracts the attention of Patience Barton, the hot-tempered daughter of Taylor (the townsfolk call her "The Sidewinder"), who, desperate to escape her frontier existence, wants to attend "Miss Hunter's College on the Hudson River, New York, for Young Ladies of Good Families", and live a life of refinement in New York City. When Latigo and Jug side with the Bartons in a dispute, Ames sends a telegram to the real Swifty Morgan, informing him of their deception.

Swifty arrives in town and immediately challenges the hapless Jug to a gunfight, but at the appointed time and place, Latigo is there in his place, sitting atop a donkey loaded with crates of dynamite. Swifty calls Latigo's bluff, but he is startled by the next mine explosion and accidentally shoots himself. The blast also panics the donkey, which charges into the Bartons' saloon. The dynamite explodes, blowing up the building, uncovering the mother lode, and removing Latigo's troublesome tattoo but leaving him otherwise uninjured.

Latigo finally wins big at roulette after betting $10,000 of the Bartons' money on number 23. From the back of a train taking Latigo and Patience to Denver to get married, Jug narrates the outcomes: Patience never goes to Miss Hunter's College, but her seven daughters do; Taylor gets his flat fixed and marries Miss Abigail; the Colonel goes broke; "Swifty Morgan's still trying to get his boots off", and Jug goes on to become a big star in Italian Westerns.

== Cast ==
- James Garner^{A} as Latigo Smith
- Suzanne Pleshette as Patience Barton
- Harry Morgan^{A} as Taylor Barton
- Jack Elam^{A} as Jug May
- John Dehner as Col. Ames
- Marie Windsor as Goldie
- Roy Glenn as Headwaiter
- Dick Curtis as Bud Barton
- Dub Taylor as Doc Shultz
- Joan Blondell as Jenny
- Ellen Corby as Abigail Ames
- Kathleen Freeman^{A} as Mrs. Martha Perkins
- Virginia Capers as Effie
- Henry Jones^{A} as Ez
- Ben Cooper as Colorado
- Grady Sutton as Storekeeper
- Pedro Gonzalez Gonzalez as Ortiz
- Gene Evans^{A} as Butcher
- Chuck Connors as "Swifty" Morgan (uncredited)

A. Also appeared in Support Your Local Sheriff!

== Production ==
The film was known as Latigo. It was shot in August and September 1970. When finishing, Kennedy wrote in his diary, "Might be a good picture. Had a fight with Jim Garner next-to-the-last night. He played movie star on me."

Bill Bowers, who wrote Support Your Local Sheriff, later recalled:

Burt had dug up an old Jimmy Grant story called Latigo, and he wanted me to do the screenplay, and I didn't like it. I said, "I'd rather start from scratch." Well anyway, Burt sat down and he did a rewrite on it, and he got Jim Garner to do it, and they made Latigo. It was at the last minute they decided to change the title to Support Your Local Gunfighter. But it was kind of crappy of them to do that.

== Reception ==
Support Your Local Gunfighter received mixed critical reviews. It holds a 62% rating on Rotten Tomatoes based on thirteen reviews.

In the commentary on the Kino Lorber DVD, Michael Schlesinger observes that the story parodies Yojimbo, with the protagonist riding into a quarreling town and hiring himself out to both sides to con everyone. He also notes the plethora of beloved character actors in the cast and believes the picture is much better than its reputation would have it.

A year later, United Artists used B-roll of the train chugging through the mountains for the title sequence of Man of the East.

== See also ==
- List of American films of 1971
