= Burt Kennedy =

American film director and screenwriter

- Born: September 3, 1922; Muskegon, Michigan, U.S.
- Died: February 15, 2001 (aged 78); Sherman Oaks, California, U.S.
- Resting place: Arlington National Cemetery
- Occupations: Film director, writer, producer
- Years active: 1955–2000

Burton Raphael Kennedy (September 3, 1922 – February 15, 2001) was an American screenwriter and director known mainly for directing Westerns. Budd Boetticher called him "the best Western writer ever."

== Biography ==
Kennedy was born in 1922 in Muskegon, Michigan. His parents were dancers in vaudeville and he joined their act, the Dancing Kennedys, when he was 4 years old. They moved to Michigan, where Kennedy attended high school. He graduated school in 1941 and enlisted in the army the following year. Kennedy was commissioned and saw World War II service in the 1st Cavalry Division during the Liberation of the Philippines as a first lieutenant. He received the Silver Star, Bronze Star, and Purple Heart with oak leaf cluster.

=== Early writing work ===
Kennedy studied at the Pasadena Playhouse, where he did some acting. "I'd walk out on stage and it felt like I'd been there my whole life," he recalled, but he found acting unsatisfactory. "I could see that you could be around this town for a long time before you could be a success as an actor, but writing, no one could stop you from writing. You're never out of work if you're a writer, you could just sit down and write."

Kennedy found work writing for radio in 1948. He began to specialise in Westerns, in part due to the advice of James Edward Grant, who told him, "Why compete with all the big writers when there are hardly any good Western writers as such?" Some good writers have written Westerns, but there were very few genuine Western writers in this town that were really good writers. He said that the competition was easier that way, and if you write a good Western, you're apt to go further faster. And it turned out, he was right. Because I never stopped, from 1953 to 1954 up until the mid-'70s, I never stopped working at all."

Kennedy used his training as a cavalry officer to secure a job as a fencing trainer and fencing stunt double in films.

=== Batjac ===
Kennedy wrote 13 episodes for a proposed TV series about a Mexican, which John Wayne read and tried to get financed as a vehicle for Pedro Gonzalez Gonzalez through Wayne's Batjac Productions.

Although the TV program was never produced, it led Kennedy to write Seven Men from Now (1956) for Batjac. It was written for Wayne, but having just completed John Ford's The Searchers, he wanted to take a break from Westerns, so it was made with Randolph Scott; Wayne later expressed regret over having passed on the film. It was directed by Budd Boetticher and was the first of what became known as the "Ranown Cycle".

Also for Batjac, Kennedy wrote Gun the Man Down (1956) starring James Arness, and Man in the Vault (1956), a contemporary thriller. Both were directed by Andrew V. McLaglen.

Kennedy also wrote The Tall T for Batjac, based on a story by Elmore Leonard. When Wayne broke up with his partner Robert Fellows, Fellows took The Tall T script and made it with Scott and Boetticher. Boetticher, Kennedy, and Scott were reteamed on Buchanan Rides Alone (1958).

=== Warner Bros. ===
Kennedy was put under contract by Warner Bros., for whom he wrote Fort Dobbs (1958) and Yellowstone Kelly (1959). He wrote two other scripts, including an adaptation of A Distant Trumpet that was not used.

Then for Boetticher and Scott again, he wrote Ride Lonesome (1959) and Comanche Station (1960). He did some uncredited work on The Alamo (1960).

=== Directing ===
Kennedy made his directorial debut with the Western The Canadians (1961) with Robert Ryan, which he also wrote, but it did poorly at the box office. He began directing episodic TV, including Lawman, The Virginian, and Combat!. Kennedy often wrote the episodes he directed, and he also served as a producer on Combat. He wrote but did not direct the Audie Murphy Western Six Black Horses (1962).

Kennedy returned to features as director with the Western comedy Mail Order Bride (1964) with Buddy Ebsen. He followed it with comedy Western The Rounders (1965), starring Glenn Ford and Henry Fonda, which Kennedy also wrote and produced. It was a sleeper hit and led to a TV series, for which Kennedy produced and directed some episodes.

Kennedy directed a contemporary film The Money Trap (1966), starring Ford and Rita Hayworth, then returned to Westerns with Return of the Seven (1966), a sequel to The Magnificent Seven with Yul Brynner returning and Robert Fuller replacing Steve McQueen as Vin Tanner.

Kennedy directed The War Wagon (1967) with John Wayne and Kirk Douglas and Welcome to Hard Times (1967) with Henry Fonda. His story formed the basis of Return of the Gunfighter (1967), though he did not direct it and he did some work on the script of Stay Away, Joe (1968).

Kennedy had a huge success directing the comedy Western Support Your Local Sheriff! (1969) starring James Garner, though Kennedy did not write the script.

Kennedy directed two films with Robert Mitchum, Young Billy Young (1969) and The Good Guys and the Bad Guys (1969), then directed Frank Sinatra in another comedy Western Dirty Dingus Magee (1970), co-written by Joseph Heller.

=== 1970s ===
Kennedy directed Richard Crenna in The Devil's Backbone (1970), after which Garner and he tried to repeat the success of Support Your Local Sheriff with Support Your Local Gunfighter (1971).

Kennedy made Hannie Caulder (1971) with Raquel Welch and was reunited with John Wayne in The Train Robbers (1973).

He turned to television for Shootout in a One Dog Town (1974) with Crenna, and Sidekicks (1974), the pilot for a TV series based on the film Skin Game (1971). He also directed a contemporary thriller, All the Kind Strangers (1974).

Kennedy started directing Drum (1976), but was replaced by producer Dino De Laurentiis with Steve Carver during the shoot. He directed The Killer Inside Me (1976), based on the Jim Thompson (writer) novel. His story provided the basis for Escape from the Dark (1976).

Kennedy returned to television doing episodes of Big Hawaii, How the West Was Won, The Rhinemann Exchange, and Concrete Cowboys. He also did the TV movies Kate Bliss and the Ticker Tape Kid (1978), The Wild Wild West Revisited (1979), and More Wild Wild West (1980).

=== 1980s ===
Kennedy wrote and directed Wolf Lake (1981) with Rod Steiger and directed more episodic television: Seven Brides for Seven Brothers, Magnum, P.I., The Yellow Rose, Simon and Simon, Rowdies, and Snoops.

He did a feature with Donald Sutherland, The Trouble with Spies (shot 1984 released 1987), the TV movies Louis L'Amour's Down the Long Hills, The Alamo: Thirteen Days to Glory (1987), Once Upon a Texas Train (1988), Where the Hell's That Gold? (1989), and Big Bad John (1990).

=== Final years ===
Kennedy's last credits as director were the Hulk Hogan comedy Suburban Commando (1991) and the TV movie Comanche (2000). He also worked on the script for the Clint Eastwood movie White Hunter Black Heart (1990).

In 1996, a Golden Palm Star on the Palm Springs Walk of Stars was dedicated to him.

Kennedy died of cancer at home on February 15, 2001, in Sherman Oaks, California. He was buried at Arlington National Cemetery on March 2, 2001.

His companion was Nancy Pendleton and he had two daughters. A documentary was made about the suspicious circumstances of his death, which included interviews with his children and details allegations that Nancy Pendleton and Costa Mesa, Orange County, Police Chief David Snowden were involved in Burt's death and the appropriation of his estate after his death.

== Filmography ==
=== Film ===
Year	Title	Director	Writer	Producer
1956	Seven Men From Now		Yes	
1956	Gun the Man Down		Yes	
1956	Man in the Vault		Yes	
1957	The Tall T		Yes	
1959	Ride Lonesome		Yes	
1960	Comanche Station		Yes	
1961	The Canadians	Yes	Yes	
1962	Six Black Horses		Yes	
1964	Mail Order Bride	Yes	Yes	
1965	The Rounders	Yes	Yes	
1965	The Money Trap	Yes		
1966	Return of the Seven	Yes		
1967	Return of the Gunfighter		Yes	
1967	Welcome to Hard Times	Yes	Yes	
1967	The War Wagon	Yes		
1969	Support Your Local Sheriff!	Yes		
1969	Young Billy Young	Yes	Yes	
1969	The Good Guys and the Bad Guys	Yes		
1970	Dirty Dingus Magee	Yes		Yes
1970	The Deserter	Yes		
1971	Support Your Local Gunfighter	Yes		Executive
1971	Hannie Caulder	Yes	Yes	
1973	The Train Robbers	Yes	Yes	
1976	The Killer Inside Me	Yes		
1976	Escape from the Dark		Yes	
1981	Wolf Lake	Yes		
1987	The Trouble with Spies	Yes	Yes	Yes
1990	Big Bad John	Yes	Yes	
1990	White Hunter Black Heart		Yes	
1991	Suburban Commando	Yes		
2000	Comanche	Yes	Yes	

=== Television ===
TV movies

Year	Title	Director	Producer	Writer
1974	Shootout in a One-Dog Town	Yes		
1974	Sidekicks	Yes	Yes	
1974	All the Kind Strangers	Yes		
1978	Kate Bliss and the Ticker Tape Kid	Yes		
1979	The Wild Wild West Revisited	Yes		
1980	More Wild Wild West	Yes		
1986	Louis L'Amour's Down the Long Hills	Yes		
1987	The Alamo: Thirteen Days to Glory	Yes		
1988	Once Upon a Texas Train	Yes	Yes	Yes
1988	Where the Hell's That Gold?	Yes	Yes	Yes
