= Robert B. Hauser =

American cinematographer (1919–1994)

- Born: March 25, 1919; Spokane, Washington, U.S.
- Died: July 8, 1994 (aged 75); Los Angeles, California, U.S.
- Occupation: Cinematographer

Robert B. Hauser, A.S.C., (March 25, 1919, Spokane, Washington – July 8, 1994, Los Angeles, California) was an American cinematographer that worked on more than 70 television and film projects from 1958 to his death in 1994, at age 75.

== Biography ==
=== Film and television ===
For a period of 10 years from 1958 to 1968 he worked mainly in television as director of photography. From 1958 to 1959 he worked on 12 episodes of Man with a Camera that starred Charles Bronson. In 1960 he did four episodes of The Untouchables. Others he worked on were Combat!, Breaking Point, Peyton Place, The Man from U.N.C.L.E., Mission: Impossible and Trapper John, M.D.. From 1968 to 1981 he worked on many films including The Odd Couple, Riot, Mean Dog Blues and Killjoy.

=== Nominations ===
He was nominated twice for Primetime Emmy awards. Once in 1963 for TV series Combat and again in 1978 for Roll of Thunder, Hear My Cry.
