= Jack Elam filmography =

This is the filmography of American actor Jack Elam (November 13, 1920 – October 20, 2003), including his film and television appearances, between 1949 and 1995.

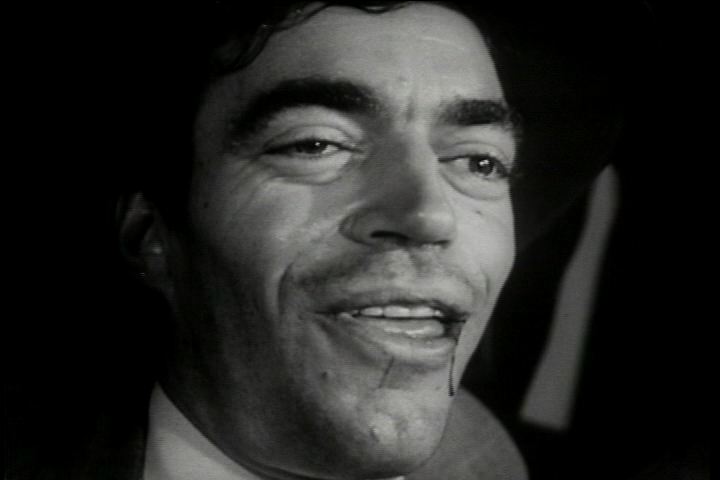
Jack Elam in Kansas City Confidential

== Selected filmography ==
Year	Title	Role	Notes
1947	Mystery Range	Burvel Lambert	
1949	She Shoulda Said No!	Henchman Raymond	also known as Wild Weed and The Devil's Weed
1950	The Sundowners	Earl Boyce	
1950	Key to the City	Councilman	Uncredited
1950	Quicksand	Bar patron	With Mickey Rooney and Peter Lorre; Uncredited
1950	One Way Street	Arnie	Uncredited
1950	A Ticket to Tomahawk	Fargo	Uncredited
1950	Love That Brute	Henchman No 2 in Cigar Store	Uncredited
1950	High Lonesome	Smiling Man	
1950	American Guerrilla in the Philippines	The Speaker	
1950	The Texan Meets Calamity Jane	Henchman	Uncredited
1951	Bird of Paradise	The Trader	
1951	Rawhide	Tevis	
1951	The Bushwackers	Cree	also known as The Rebel
1952	Finders Keepers	Eddie	
1952	The Battle at Apache Pass	Mescal Jack	
1952	Rancho Notorious	Mort Geary	With Tyrone Power
1952	High Noon	Drunken Charlie in jail	Uncredited
1952	Montana Territory	Gimp	
1952	Lure of the Wilderness	Dave Longden	
1952	My Man and I	Celestino Garcia	
1952	The Ring	Harry Jackson	
1952	Kansas City Confidential	Pete Harris aka Johnson	With Neville Brand, and Lee Van Cleef
1953	Count the Hours	Max Verne	also known as Every Minute Counts
1953	Ride Vaquero!	Barton	
1953	Gun Belt	Rusty Kolloway	
1953	The Moonlighter	Slim	
1953	Appointment in Honduras	Castro	With Glenn Ford
1954	Jubilee Trail	Whitey	
1954	Ride Clear of Diablo	Tim Lowerie	
1954	Princess of the Nile	Basra	
1954	The Far Country	Frank Newberry	With Jimmy Stewart
1954	Cattle Queen of Montana	Yost	
1954	Vera Cruz	Tex	
1955	Tarzan's Hidden Jungle	Burger	
1955	The Man From Laramie	Chris Boldt, the town liar	With Jimmy Stewart
1955	Man Without a Star	Knife Murderer	With Kirk Douglas; Uncredited
1955	Kiss Me Deadly	Charlie Max	
1955	Moonfleet	Damen	
1955	Wichita	Al Mann	With Joel McCrea
1955	Artists and Models	Ivan	With Dean Martin, Jerry Lewis, and Eva Gabor
1955	Kismet	Hassan-Ben	
1956	Jubal	McCoy, Bar 8 Rider	
1956	Pardners	Pete	With Dean Martin and Jerry Lewis
1956	Thunder Over Arizona	Deputy Slats Callahan	
1957	Dragoon Wells Massacre	Tioga	
1957	Lure of the Swamp	Henry Bliss	
1957	Gunfight at the O.K. Corral	Tom McLowery	With Kirk Douglas and Burt Lancaster
1957	Night Passage	Shotgun	With Jimmy Stewart
1957	Baby Face Nelson	Fatso Negel	
1958	The Gun Runners	Arnold	
1959	Edge of Eternity	Bill Ward, miner at the Grand Canyon	
1959	The Girl in Lovers Lane	Jesse	
1961	The Last Sunset	Ed Hobbs	With Kirk Douglas, & Rock Hudson
1961	The Comancheros	Horseface (Comanchero)	With John Wayne
1961	A Pocketful of Miracles	Cheesecake	With Glenn Ford
1963	4 for Texas	Dobie	With Dean Martin, Anita Ekberg, Charles Bronson, and Mike Mazurki
1966	The Rare Breed	Simons	With Jimmy Stewart, Maureen O'Hara, Brian Keith, Ben Johnson
1966	The Night of the Grizzly	Hank	
1967	The Way West	Preacher Weatherby	With Robert Mitchum, Kirk Douglas, and Richard Widmark, and Harry Carey, Jr.
1967	The Last Challenge	Ernest Scarnes	With Glenn Ford, & Angie Dickinson
1968	Firecreek	Norman	With Jimmy Stewart, and Henry Fonda
1968	Never a Dull Moment	Ace Williams	With Dick Van Dyke & Edward G. Robinson
1968	Sartana Does Not Forgive	Slim Kovacs	
1968	Once Upon a Time in the West	Snaky, member of Frank's gang	With Henry Fonda, Charles Bronson, & Claudia Cardinale
1969	Support Your Local Sheriff!	Deputy Jake	With James Garner, Walter Brennan, Bruce Dern, Harry Morgan, and Gene Evans
1969	The Over-the-Hill Gang	Sheriff Clyde Barnes	With Walter Brennan, Andy Devine, Chill Wills
1970	Cockeyed Cowboys of Calico County	Kittrick	
1970	Dirty Dingus Magee	John Wesley Hardin	With George Kennedy
1970	The Wild Country	Thompson	
1970	Rio Lobo	Philips, a rancher	With John Wayne
1971	Support Your Local Gunfighter	Jake	With James Garner, Suzanne Pleshette, Dub Taylor, Harry Morgan, and Chuck Connors
1971	The Last Rebel	Matt	
1971	Hannie Caulder	Frank Clemens	With Robert Culp, Strother Martin, and Ernest Borgnine
1973	The Red Pony	Granddad	With Henry Fonda, Maureen O'Hara, Ben Johnson
1973	Pat Garrett & Billy the Kid	Alamosa Bill	With Kris Kristofferson, James Coburn. Richard Jaeckel
1974	Knife for the Ladies	Jarrod (Sheriff)	
1976	Creature from Black Lake	Joe Canton	
1976	Hawmps!	Bad Jack Cutter	
1976	The Winds of Autumn	J. Pete Hankins	
1976	Pony Express Rider	Crazy Charlie	
1977	Grayeagle	Trapper Willis	With Alex Cord, Ben Johnson, and Iron Eyes Cody
1978	Hot Lead and Cold Feet	Rattlesnake	With Don Knotts, and Darren McGavin
1978	The Norseman	Death Dreamer	
1979	Louis L'Amour's The Sacketts	Ira Bigelow	Tom Selleck, Sam Elliott, Ben Johnson, Glenn Ford, John Vernon, Slim Pickens, James Gammon, and Gene Evans; TV Mini-Series
1979	The Apple Dumpling Gang Rides Again	Big Mack	With Don Knotts, Tim Conway, and Harry Morgan
1979	The Villain	Avery Simpson	With Kirk Douglas, Arnold Schwarzenegger, Ann-Margret, Paul Lynde, Foster Brooks, Strother Martin, and Ruth Buzzi
1981	The Cannonball Run	Doctor Nikolas Van Helsing	With Burt Reynolds, Roger Moore, Dom DeLuise, Farrah Fawcett, John Fiedler, Adrienne Barbeau, Sammy Davis, Jr., & Dean Martin
1981	Soggy Bottom, U.S.A.	Troscliar Boudreaux	
1982	Jinxed!	Otto	
1983	Sacred Ground	Lum Witcher	With L.Q. Jones
1983	Lost	Mr. Newsome	
1984	Cannonball Run II	Doctor Nikolas Vans Helsing	With Burt Reynolds, Dean Martin, Telly Savalas, Jackie Chan, Ricardo Montalbán, Dom DeLuise, Abe Vigoda, Jim Nabors, Tim Conway, Dub Taylor, Fred Dryer, Sammy Davis, Jr, & Shirley MacLaine
1985	The Aurora Encounter	Charlie	
1987	Hawken's Breed	Tackett	
1988	Once Upon a Texas Train	Jason Fitch	With Willie Nelson, Richard Widmark, Chuck Connors, Gene Evans, Dub Taylor, Harry Carey, Jr., Hank Worden, Stuart Whitman, Angie Dickinson, & Royal Dano; TV Movie
1988	Where The Hell's That Gold?	Boone	With Willie Nelson, Delta Burke, and Gerald McRaney; TV Movie
1990	Big Bad John	Jake Calhoun	With Ned Beatty, Bo Hopkins, Buck Taylor, Jeff Osterhage, & Anne Lockhart
1991	The Giant of Thunder Mountain	Hezekiah Crow	
1991	Suburban Commando	Col. Dustin "Dusty" McHowell	With Hulk Hogan, & Christopher Lloyd, & Shelley Duvall
1993	Shadow Force	Tommy	With Dirk Benedict, Lance LeGault, & Bob Hastings
1993	Bonanza: The Return	Buckshot	TV movie
1993	Uninvited	Grady	
1995	Bonanza: Under Attack	Buckshot	TV movie, (final film role)

== Television ==
Year	Title	Role	Notes
1954	Mr and Mrs North	Matt Weber	Episode: "Loon Lake"
1954	Four Star Playhouse	Vic	Episode: "The Hard Way"
1954	Stories of the Century	Black Jack Ketchum	
1954–55	The Lone Ranger	(a) Reno Lawrence (b) Jack Miles	Episodes (a) "Outlaw's Trail" and (b) "The Sheriff's Wife"
1955	Frontier	(a) Father Matias (b) Ness Fowler	Episodes (a) "Ferdinand Meyer's Army" and (b) "Cattle Drive to Casper"
1955	The Adventures of Rin Tin Tin	Shields	Episode: "Bounty Hunters"
1957	Wagon Train	Charlie Otis	episode "The John Cameron Story"
1957–58	The Restless Gun		2 episodes
1958	Zorro	Gomez the coachman	episodes "Shadow of Doubt"/"Garcia Stands Accused"/"Slaves of the Eagle"
1958–63	The Rifleman	Various	Appearances in 5 episodes: "Duel of Honor" as Sim Groder; "Tension" as Gavin Martin; "Knight Errant" as Gates; "Shotgun Man" as Gus Smith; and "Shattered Idol" as Russell the pool shark.
1958–59	Richard Diamond, Private Detective	(a) Danny; (b) Perk Butler	Episodes: (a) "The Dark Horse" (1958); (b) "One Dead Cat" (1959)
1959	Tombstone Territory	Wally Jobe	Episode "Day of the Amnesty"
1959	The Texan	Luke Watson	Episode "South of the Border"
1959-1962	Have Gun Will Travel	Joe Gage, Shaffner	Episode: "The Man Who Lost"; Episode:(2/171962) "one, two, three"
1959	Mackenzie's Raiders	Trooper Colin Grimes	Episode "Desertion"
1960	Zane Grey Theatre	Jimmy	Episode "Miss Jenny"
1959–72	Gunsmoke	Various characters	15 episodes
1959–1961	Sugarfoot	Toothy Thompson	2 episodes
1959–1961	The Twilight Zone	Avery	Episode "Will the Real Martian Please Stand Up?"
1959–1961	The Rebel	Lawyer	Episode S01/Ep14 "Angry Town" (1/10/1960)
1959–1961	The Rebel	Uncle Luce	Episode S02/Ep33 "Helping Hand"
1959–1961	The Untouchables	Nick Bravo	Episode: (1/07/1960) S01/Ep13 "Syndicate Sanctuary"
1959–1961	National Velvet	Black Barr	Episode "The Desperado"
1959–1961	The Americans	Loper Johnson	Episode "The Gun"
1959–1961	Lawman	Herm Forrest	Episode "The Four"
1961–62	Cheyenne	Count Nicholas Potosi/Deputy J.D. Smith/Calhoun Durango	Episodes "Massacre at Gunsight Pass"/"A Man Called Ragan" (The Dakotas pilot) /"The Durango Brothers"
1961	Laramie	Charlie	Episode "The Tumbleweed Wagon"
1962	Target: The Corruptors	Stickface	Episode "A Man's Castle"
1962	Ben Casey	Felix Gault	Episode "The Night That Nothing Happened"
1963	The Dakotas	Deputy J.D. Smith	series regular
1963–64	Temple Houston		
1965	Daniel Boone	Petch	Episode 18 "The Sound of Fear"
1965	F Troop	Sam Urp	Episode "Dirge for the Scourge"
1965–66	The Legend of Jesse James	Deacon Smith	Guest star
1966	Gunsmoke	Jim Barrett	Guest star
1967	Hondo	Diablo	Episode "Hondo and the Rebel Hat"
1967	Tarzan	Beliak	Episode "Circus"
1967	The Guns of Will Sonnett	Sheriff Sam	Episode "A Son for a Son"
1968	The High Chaparral	Mackdin (comanchero)	Episode "North to Tucson"
1969	Ride a Northbound Horse		Part of Disney's Wonderful World series
1961–70	Bonanza	Dodie Hoad/Buford Buckalaw/Honest John	Episodes "The Spitfire"/"A Bride for Buford"/"Honest John"
1970	The Virginian	Harve Yost	Episode "Rich Man, Poor Man"
1971	Gunsmoke	U.S. Marshal Lucas Murdoch	
1972	Gunsmoke	Pierre	Episodes S18/Ep01-Ep02 "The River"
1972	Alias Smith and Jones	Boot Coby	Episode "Bad Night in Big Butte"
1972	Nichols	Marcus A.F. Baxter	Episode "About Jesse James"
1973	Kung Fu	Marcus Taylor	Episode "The Squawman"
1974	The Brian Keith Show		Guest star
1975	Walt Disney's Wonderful World of Color	Thompson	Episode "Wild Country: Part 2"
1974–75	The Texas Wheelers		Situation comedy with co-star Gary Busey
1977–78	How the West Was Won	Cully Madigan	Episodes "#1.2-#1.4"
1979	Struck by Lightning	Frankenstein's monster	In an interview, in variety, Elam recalled that when he was approached to take the part, he was told he would not need makeup; his appearance was already perfect for the part. This statement convinced him to accept the role. The program only lasted about three weeks before it was canceled, either due to low ratings or because its use of dark humor made it inappropriate for American audiences at the time.
1985	Detective in the House	Nick Turner	series regular
1986	Easy Street	Uncle Alvin "Bully" Stevenson	series regular
1986	Simon & Simon	Bud Krelman	Episode "D-I-V-O-R-C-E"
1986	Louis L'Amour's Down the Long Hills	Squires	TV movie
1992	Lucky Luke	Axel Ericson	Episode "Ghost Train"
1992	Home Improvement	Hick Peterson	Episode "Birds of a Feather Flock to Taylor"
1994–95	Lonesome Dove: The Series	Curtis	Episodes "High Lonesome"/"The List"
