= List of Western films of the 1980s =

A list of Western films released in the 1980s.

Title	Director	Cast	Country	Subgenre/notes
1980
Belle Starr	John A. Alonzo	Elizabeth Montgomery, Cliff Potts, Michael Cavanaugh, Gary Combs, Fred Ward, Jesse Vint, Sam Vint, Geoffrey Lewis, Sandy McPeak, David Nell, Michelle Stacy, Peter Hobbs, Morgan Paul	United States	Traditional Western
Bronco Billy	Clint Eastwood	Clint Eastwood, Sondra Locke, Geoffrey Lewis, Scatman Crothers, Bill McKinney, Sam Bottoms, Dan Vadis, Sierra Pecheur, Walter Barnes, Woodrow Parfrey, Doug McGrath, Hank Worden, Merle Haggard	United States	Contemporary Western
Heaven's Gate	Michael Cimino	Kris Kristofferson, Christopher Walken, John Hurt, Sam Waterston, Brad Dourif, Isabelle Huppert, Joseph Cotten, Jeff Bridges, Geoffrey Lewis, Paul Koslo, Richard Masur, Ronnie Hawkins, Terry O'Quinn, Tom Noonan, Mickey Rourke, Willem Dafoe, Roseanne Vela, Nicholas Woodeson	United States	Epic Western
High Noon, Part II: The Return of Will Kane	Jerry Jameson	Lee Majors, David Carradine, Pernell Roberts, Katherine Cannon, Michael Pataki, M. Emmet Walsh, Frank Campanella, J. A. Preston, Tracey Walter, Britt Leach, Sanford Gibbons	United States	Made for television Western
Honeysuckle Rose	Jerry Schatzberg	Willie Nelson, Dyan Cannon, Amy Irving, Slim Pickens	United States	Contemporary Western
Kenny Rogers as The Gambler	Dick Lowry	Kenny Rogers, Bruce Boxleitner, Harold Gould, Clu Gulager, Lance LeGault, Lee Purcell, Ronnie Scribner, Noble Willingham, Christine Belford	United States	Made for television Western
The Legend of Alfred Packer	Jim Roberson	Patrick Dray, Ronald Haines	United States	Biographical Western
Lobo Negro	Rafael Romero Marchent		Spain	
The Long Riders	Walter Hill	James Keach, Stacy Keach, David Carradine, Keith Carradine, Robert Carradine, Dennis Quaid, Randy Quaid, Christopher Guest, Nicholas Guest, James Whitmore, Jr., Harry Carey, Jr., Pamela Reed, James Remar	United States	Outlaw Western
More Wild Wild West	Burt Kennedy	Robert Conrad, Ross Martin, Victor Buono, Jonathan Winters, René Auberjonois, Avery Schreiber, Dave Madden, Liz Torres, Candi Brough, Randi Brough, Harry Morgan, Hector Elias, Gino Conforti, Joe Alfasa	United States	Made for television science fiction Western (based on TV series The Wild Wild West)
The Mountain Men	Richard Lang	Charlton Heston, Brian Keith, Victoria Racimo, Stephen Macht, John Glover, Seymour Cassel, Cal Bellini, Victor Jory, David Ackroyd, William Lucking	United States	Traditional Western
Rodeo Girl	Jackie Cooper	Katharine Ross, Bo Hopkins, Candy Clark, Jacqueline Brookes, Wilford Brimley, Parley Baer, Nancy Priddy, Dee Croxton, Bob Tallman, Lex Connelly	United States	Rodeo Western
Tom Horn	William Wiard	Steve McQueen, Linda Evans, Richard Farnsworth, Billy Green Bush, Slim Pickens, Peter Canon, Elisha Cook, Roy Jenson, James Kline, Geoffrey Lewis, Harry Northup, Steve Oliver, Bill Thurman, Bert Williams, Mickey Jones, Clark Coleman, Chuck Hayward	United States	Traditional Western biography of Tom Horn
Urban Cowboy	James Bridges	John Travolta, Debra Winger, Scott Glenn, Madolyn Smith, Barry Corbin, Brooke Alderson, Cooper Huckabee, James Gammon, Mickey Gilley, Johnny Lee, Bonnie Raitt, Charlie Daniels, Gator Conley, Tamara Champlin, Jerry Hall, Steve Strange, Norman Tucker, Jessie La Rive, Connie Hanson, Sherwood Cryer, Christopher Saylors	United States	Contemporary Western
Wild Times	Richard Compton	Sam Elliott, Ben Johnson, Bruce Boxleitner, Penny Peyser, Timothy Scott, Dennis Hopper, Trish Stewart, Harry Carey, Jr., Buck Taylor, Pat Hingle, Cameron Mitchell, Gene Evans, Leif Erickson, L.Q. Jones	United States	Traditional Western
Windwalker	Kieth Merrill	Trevor Howard, Nick Ramus, James Remar, Serene Hedin, Dusty McCrea, Silvana Gallardo, Emerson John, Bart the Bear	United States	Traditional Western
1981
Cattle Annie and Little Britches	Lamont Johnson	Burt Lancaster, John Savage, Rod Steiger, Diane Lane, Amanda Plummer, Scott Glenn, Ken Call, Redmond Gleeson, William Russ, Buck Taylor, Michael Conrad, Perry Lang, John Quade, Steven Ford, John Quade, Roger Cudney Jr., Chad Hastings, Yvette Sweetman, Jerry Gatlin	United States	Outlaw Western
Comin' at Ya!	Ferdinando Baldi	Tony Anthony, Victoria Abril, Gene Quintano	Italy; Spain; United States	3-D Western
Death Hunt	Peter R. Hunt	Charles Bronson, Lee Marvin, Andrew Stevens, Carl Weathers, Ed Lauter, Scott Hylands, Angie Dickinson, Henry Beckman, William Sanderson, Jon Cedar, James O'Connell, Len Lesser, Maury Chaykin, August Schellenberg, Dick Davalos, Tantoo Cardinal	United States	Northern
Duelo a muerte	Rafael Romero Marchent	Fernando Allende	Spain	
Fire on the Mountain	Donald Wrye	Buddy Ebsen, Ron Howard, Julie Carmen, Ross Harris, Ed Brodow, Michael Conrad, Gary Graham, Richard Chaves, Harvey Vernon, Will Hare	United States	Contemporary Western
Hard Country	David Greene	Jan-Michael Vincent, Kim Basinger, Michael Parks, Gailard Sartain, Tanya Tucker, Daryl Hannah, Lewis Van Bergen, Ted Neeley, Richard Lineback, Richard Moll, Cisse Cameron, Teri Foster Brooks, A'leisha Brevard, Henry G. Sanders, Michael Martin Murphey, Katy Moffatt	United States	Contemporary Western
The Legend of the Lone Ranger	William A. Fraker	Klinton Spilsbury, Michael Horse, Christopher Lloyd, Matt Clark, Juanin Clay, Jason Robards, John Bennett Perry, John Hart, Richard Farnsworth, Ted Flicker, Buck Taylor, Tom Laughlin, Merle Haggard, Lincoln Tate	United States; United Kingdom	Fantasy Western
Outland	Peter Hyams	Sean Connery, Frances Sternhagen, Peter Boyle, James Sikking, Kika Markham, Nicholas Barnes, Clarke Peters, Steven Berkoff, John Ratzenberger, Manning Redwood, Angus MacInnes, Eugene Lipinski, Sharon Duce, P.H. Moriarty, Doug Robinson, Angelique Rockas	United States	Space Western
Pruncul, petrolul şi ardelenii	Dan Piţa	Mircea Diaconu, Ilarion Ciobanu, Ovidiu Iuliu Moldovan, Tania Filip	Romania	Comedy western
La venganza del Lobo Negro	Rafael Romero Marchent		Spain	
Zorro, The Gay Blade	Peter Medak	George Hamilton, Lauren Hutton, Brenda Vaccaro, Ron Leibman	United States, Mexico	Comedy Western
1982
The Avenging	Lyman Dayton	Michael Horse, Sherry Hursey	United States	B Western
Barbarosa	Fred Schepisi	Willie Nelson, Gary Busey, Gilbert Roland, Isela Vega, Danny De La Paz, Alama Martinez, George Voskovec, Sharon Compton, Howland Chamberlain, Wolf Muser, Kai Wulff, Roberto Contreras, Luis Contreras, Jake Busey	United States	B Western
The Grey Fox	Phillip Borsos	Richard Farnsworth, Jackie Burroughs, Ken Pogue, Wayne Robson, Timothy Webber, Gary Reineke, Don Mackay, Samantha Langevin, Tom Heaton, James McLarty, Sean Sullivan, Frank Turner	Canada	Traditional Western
Harry Tracy	William A. Graham	Bruce Dern, Helen Shaver, Gordon Lightfoot, Michael C. Gwynne, Jacques Hubert, Daphne Goldrick, Lynne Kolber, Alec Willows, Frank C. Turner, Fred Diehl, Jack Ackroyd, Walter Scott	Canada	Comedy Western
Honkytonk Man	Clint Eastwood	Clint Eastwood, Kyle Eastwood, John McIntire, Alexa Kenin, Verna Bloom, Matt Clark, Barry Corbin, Jerry Hardin, Tim Thomerson, Charles Cyphers, Porter Wagoner, Macon McCalman, Joe Regalbuto, Gary Grubbs, Marty Robbins, Tracey Walter	United States	Contemporary Western
The Legend of Walks Far Woman	Mel Damski	Raquel Welch, Bradford Dillman, George Clutesi, Nick Mancuso, Eloy Casados, Frank Salsedo, Hortensia Colorado, Nick Ramus, Alex Kubik, Branscombe Richmond	United States	
The Man from Snowy River	George T. Miller	Tom Burlinson, Terence Donovan, Kirk Douglas, Tommy Dysart, Bruce Kerr, David Bradshaw, Sigrid Thornton, Jack Thompson, Tony Bonner, June Jago, Chris Haywood, Kristopher Steele, Gus Mercurio, Howard Eynon, Lorraine Bayly	Australia	Outback Western
Mother Lode	Charlton Heston	Charlton Heston, Nick Mancuso, Kim Basinger, John Marley, Dale Wilson, Rocky Zantolas, Marie George	United States	Contemporary Western
Mountain Charlie	George Stapleford	Dick Robinson, Denise Neilson	United States	Family Western
Plainsong	Ed Stabile	Jessica Nelson, Teresanne Joseph, Lyn Traverse	United States	Western drama
The Shadow Riders	Andrew McLaglen	Tom Selleck, Sam Elliott, Dominique Dunne, Katharine Ross, Ben Johnson, Scanlon Gail, Geoffrey Lewis, Jeff Osterhage, Gene Evans, R. G. Armstrong, Marshall R. Teague, Jane Greer, Harry Carey, Jr., Jeannetta Arnette, Owen Orr	United States	Traditional Western
Showdown at Eagle Gap	William Witney	Madison Mason, Rockne Tarkington, Petrus Antonius, Skip Homeier, Cherie Lunghi, Ulrich von Dobschütz, Mike Moroff, Leopoldo Salazar, Roger Cudney, Pilar Pellicer, Adriana Parra, Luz María Peña, William Witney	United States	B Western
Timerider: The Adventure of Lyle Swann	William Dear	Fred Ward, Belinda Bauer, Peter Coyote, Richard Masur, Tracey Walter, Ed Lauter, L.Q. Jones, Chris Mulkey, Macon McCalman	United States	Time travel Western
The Wild Women of Chastity Gulch	Philip Leacock	Priscilla Barnes, Lee Horsley, Joan Collins, Howard Duff, Morgan Brittany, Donny Osmond, Lisa Whelchel, Pamela Bellwood, Phyllis Davis, Jeanette Nolan, Paul Brinegar, Dennis Fimple	United States	Comedy Western
1983
Al oeste del Río Grande	José María Zabalza	Aldo Sambrell	Spain	
Cowboy	Jerry Jameson	James Brolin, Ted Danson, George DiCenzo, Robert Keith, Michael Pataki, Annie Potts, Randy Quaid	United States	Contemporary Western
Eyes of Fire	Avery Crounse	Dennis Lipscomb, Guy Boyd	United States	Horror Western
Gold Rush Boys	Steve Scott	J.W. King	United States	Gay pornographic Western
Un hombre llamado El Diablo	Rafael Villaseñor Kuri	Vicente Fernández	Mexico	
I Married Wyatt Earp	Michael O'Herlihy	Marie Osmond, Bruce Boxleitner, John Bennett Perry, Jeffrey De Munn, Allison Arngrim, Ross Martin, Ron Manning, Josef Rainer, Charles Benton, Earl W. Smith	United States	Traditional Western
Kenny Rogers as The Gambler: The Adventure Continues	Dick Lowry	Kenny Rogers, Bruce Boxleitner, Linda Evans, Johnny Crawford, Charlie Fields, David Hedison, Robert Hoy, Brion James, Paul Koslo, Cameron Mitchell, Mitchell Ryan, Gregory Sierra, Ken Swofford, Harold Gould	United States	Traditional Western
Lone Star	John Flynn	Lewis Smith, Alan Autry, Terri Garber, John McIntire, Chuck Connors	United States	B Western
Lone Wolf McQuade	Steve Carver	Chuck Norris, David Carradine, Barbara Carrera, Leon Isaac Kennedy, Robert Beltran, L.Q. Jones, Dana Kimmell, R.G. Armstrong, Sharon Farrell, William Sanderson	United States	Contemporary Western
Mercenários de la muerte	Gregorio Casal	Emilio Fernández	Mexico	
Sacred Ground	Charles B. Pierce	Tim McIntire, Jack Elam, L. Q. Jones, Eloy Casados	United States	
The Scout	Dshamjangijn Buntar, Konrad Petzold	Gojko Mitić, Battsetseg Natsagdorj	East Germany	Revisionist Western
Triumphs of a Man Called Horse	John Hough	Richard Harris, Michael Beck, Ana De Sade, Vaughn Armstrong, Anne Seymour, Buck Taylor, Lautaro Murúa, Simón Andreu, Roger Cudney, Gerry Gatlin, John Davis Chandler, Miguel Ángel Fuentes, Sebastian Ligarde, Erika Carlsson, Anaís de Melo	United States; Mexico; Canada; Spain	Revisionist Western
September Gun	Don Taylor	Robert Preston, Patty Duke Astin, Geoffrey Lewis, Sally Kellerman, David Knell, Jacques Aubuchon, Christopher Lloyd, Jonathan Gries, Clayton Landey, Pat Anderson, Gene Blakely, Don Collier	United States	B Western
Todo un hombre	Rafael Villaseñor Kuri	Vicente Fernández	Mexico	
1984
Al Este del Oeste	Mariano Ozores	Fernando Esteso, Fernando Sancho	Spain	Comedy Western
Calamity Jane	James Goldstone	Jane Alexander, Frederic Forrest, Ken Kercheval, Walter Olkewicz, Talia Balsam, Walter Scott, David Hemmings, Jack Murdock, Larry Cedar, Laurie O'Brien, Sara Gilbert, Gillian Eaton	United States	Traditional Western
Charrito	Roberto Gómez Bolaños	Roberto Gómez Bolaños, Rubén Aguirre	Mexico	Comedy Western
Draw!	Steven Hilliard Stern	Kirk Douglas, James Coburn, Alexandra Bastedo, Graham Jarvis, Derek McGrath, Jason Michas, Len Birman, Maurice Brand, Graham McPherson, Linda Sorenson, Gerard Parkes, Richard Donat, Frank Adamson, Stuart Gillard, Larry Musser, Frank C. Turner, Brian George	Canada	Comedy Western
No Man's Land	Rod Holcomb	Marc Alaimo, Wil Albert, Frank Bonner, Donna Dixon, Terri Garber, Jack Garner, Estelle Getty, Sam J. Jones, Ralph Michael, Melissa Michaelsen, Janis Paige, John Quade, Dack Rambo, John Rhys-Davies, Jeremy Ross, Stella Stevens, Tony Swartz, Buck Taylor, Robert Webber, Roz Witt, Tom Willett	United States	B Western
Yellow Hair and the Fortress of Gold	Matt Cimber	Laurene Landon, Ken Roberson, John Ghaffairi, Luis Lorenzo, Claudia Gravy, Aldo Sambrel, Eduardo Fajardo, Ramiro Oliveros, Suzannah Woodside, Cocha Marquez Piquer, Tony Tarruella, Daniel Martín, Román Ariz-Navarreta, Pablo G. Ortega, Frank Brana	Spain; United States	Mexico Western
1985
Alien Outlaw	Phil Smoot	Stephen Winegard, Sunset Carson, Lash LaRue	United States	Science fiction Western
All American Cowboy	Howell Upchurch	James Drury, Gene Autry, Chuck Connors, Johnny Crawford, Ken Curtis, Leo Gordon, Merle Haggard, Benton Jennings, Waylon Jennings, June Lockhart, Jock Mahoney, Charley Pride, Buck Taylor, Clint Walker	United States	Singing cowboy Western
Atkins	Helge Trimpert	Oleg Borisov	East Germany	Euro-Western
Forajidos en la mira	Alberto Mariscal	Sergio Goyri	Mexico	
El gatillo de la muerte	Fernando Durán Rojas	Fernando Almada	Mexico	
Lust in the Dust	Paul Bartel	Tab Hunter, Divine, Lainie Kazan, Cesar Romero, Geoffrey Lewis, Henry Silva, Courtney Gains, Gina Gallego, Nedra Volz, Woody Strode, Pedro Gonzalez Gonzalez	United States	Comedy Western
Los matones del Norte	Alfredo B. Crevenna	Armando Silvestre	Mexico	
Man Hunt	Larry Ludman	John Ethan Wayne, Raimund Harmstorf, Henry Silva, Bo Svenson, Ernest Borgnine, Terry Lynch, Don Taylor, Farris Castleberry, Susan Wilson, Robin Fugget, Jack Dunlap, Danny O'Haco, Claud Hereford, Austin Ludson, Charles Julian, Lawrence Niemi, Arthur Rothbard, Ed Adams	Italy	Contemporary spaghetti Western
Pale Rider	Clint Eastwood	Clint Eastwood, Michael Moriarty, Carrie Snodgress, Chris Penn, Richard Dysart, Sydney Penny, Richard Kiel, Doug McGrath, John Russell, Chuck Lafont, Jeffrey Weissman, S.A. Griffin, Billy Drago, John Dennis Johnston, Charles Hallahan, Richard Hamilton, Fran Ryan, Marvin J. McIntyre, Gerry Gatlin	United States	Revisionist Western
Robbery Under Arms	Donald Crombie, Ken Hannam	Sam Neill, Steven Vidler, Christopher Cummins	Australia	Outback Western
Rustlers' Rhapsody	Hugh Wilson	Tom Berenger, G.W. Bailey, Marilu Henner, Andy Griffith, Fernando Rey, Sela Ward, Brant Van Hoffman, Christopher Malcolm, Jim Carter, Paul Maxwell, Manuel Pereiro, Margarita Calahorra, Billy J. Mitchell, John Orchard, Emilio Linder, Alan Larson, Thomas Abbot, Patrick Wayne	United States	Comedy Western
Silverado	Lawrence Kasdan	Kevin Kline, Scott Glenn, Rosanna Arquette, John Cleese, Kevin Costner, Brian Dennehy, Danny Glover, Jeff Goldblum, Linda Hunt, Joe Seneca, Ray Baker, Thomas Wilson Brown, Jeff Fahey, Lynn Whitfield, Amanda Wyss, Richard Jenkins, Brion James, James Gammon, Sheb Wooley, Earl Hindman, Pepe Serna	United States	Traditional Western
Space Rage	Conrad E. Palmisano	Richard Farnsworth, Michael Paré, John Laughlin, Lee Purcell	United States	Space Western
Tex and the Lord of the Deep	Duccio Tessari	Giuliano Gemma, William Berger, Carlo Mucari, Isabel Russinova, Peter Berling, Flavio Bucci, Aldo Sambrell, Jose Luis de Vilallonga, Ricardo Petrazzi, Pietro Torrisi, Frank Brana, Ricardo Palacios	Italy	Spaghetti Western/fantasy based on the Tex Willer comics
Wild Horses	Dick Lowry	Kenny Rogers, Pam Dawber, Ben Johnson, David Andrews, Richard Masur, Karen Carlson, Richard Farnsworth, Richard Hamilton, Buck Taylor, Riders in the Sky	United States	Contemporary Western
The Wind Favors West	Dean Reading	Jack Dillon	United States	
1986
Ahora mis pistolas hablan	Fernando Orozco, Aldo Sambrell	Emilio Fernández, Aldo Sambrell	Spain; Mexico; Colombia	
Astucia	Mario Hernández	Ignacio López Tarso, Jorge Martínez de Hoyos	Mexico	
The Aurora Encounter	Jim McCullough, Sr.	Jack Elam, Peter Brown, Dottie West	United States	Science fiction Western based on the Aurora, Texas, UFO incident
Bianco Apache	Claudio Fragasso, Bruno Mattei	Sebastian Harrison, Lola Forner, Alberto Farnese	Italy; Spain	
Gone to Texas	Peter Levin	Sam Elliott, Claudia Christian, Devon Ericson, Ned Romero, Ivy Pryce, William Russ, John P. Ryan, Michael Beck, Bo Hopkins, James Stephens, Michael C. Gwynne, Donald Moffat, John Quade, G.D. Spradlin	United States	Biography of Sam Houston
The Last Days of Frank and Jesse James	William A. Graham	Johnny Cash, Kris Kristofferson, Marcia Cross, Gail Youngs, David Allan Coe, Andy Stahl, June Carter Cash, Ed Bruce, Darrell Wilks, Margaret Gibson, Kal Roberts, Willie Nelson	United States	Outlaw Western (filmed at the Tennessee Valley Railroad Museum)
Louis L'Amour's Down the Long Hills	Burt Kennedy	Bruce Boxleitner, Michael Wren, Bo Hopkins, Don Shanks, Ed Bruce, Buck Taylor, Thomas Wilson Brown, Lisa McFarlane, Jack Elam, David S. Cass, Sr., Peggy Matheson, Michael Ruud, Corky Randall, Roy J. Cohoe, Richard J. Martin, Fenton Quinn	United States	Traditional Western
La muerte de un pistolero	Ángel Rodríguez Vázquez	Hugo Stiglitz	Mexico	
The Rebellion of the Hanged	Juan Luis Buñuel	Manuel Ojeda, Roberto Sosa, Fernando Balzaretti, Elena Sofia Ricci, Günther Maria Halmer, Uwe Ochsenknecht, Reiner Schöne, Jean-François Stévenin, Patricia Reyes Spíndola, Miguel Ángel Rodríguez, José Carlos Ruiz, Jorge Russek, Enrique Lucero	Mexico	Based on B. Traven's The Rebellion of the Hanged
Red Headed Stranger	William Wittliff	Willie Nelson, Morgan Fairchild, R.G. Armstrong, Royal Dano, Katharine Ross, Sonny Carl Davis, Ted J. Crum, Marinell Madden, Bryan Fowler, Paul English, Bee Spears	United States	Traditional Western
The Return of Josey Wales	Michael Parks	Michael Parks, Rafael Campos, Everett Sifuentes, Suzie Humphreys, John Galt, Charles McCoy, Joe Kurtzo, Paco Vela, Bob Magruder, Benita Faulkner	United States	Traditional Western
Río de oro	Ralph E. Portillo	Henry Adriano	Mexico	
Stagecoach	Ted Post	Willie Nelson, Kris Kristofferson, Johnny Cash, Waylon Jennings, John Schneider, Elizabeth Ashley, Anthony Newley, Tony Franciosa, Merritt Butrick, Mary Crosby, June Carter Cash, Jessi Colter	United States	Traditional Western
Three Amigos	John Landis	Steve Martin, Chevy Chase, Martin Short, Alfonso Arau, Tony Plana, Patrice Martinez, Joe Mantegna, Phil Hartman, Jon Lovitz, Tino Insana, Loyda Ramos, Phillip Gordon, Kai Wulff, Norbert Weisser, Brian Thompson, Randy Newman, Rebecca Underwood	United States	Comedy Western
El tres de copas	Felipe Cazals	Humberto Zurita, Pedro Armendáriz, Jr.	Mexico	
Uphill All the Way	Frank Q. Dobbs	Roy Clark, Mel Tillis, Frank Gorshin, Richard Paul, Burl Ives, Glen Campbell, Burton Gilliam, Gailard Sartain, Elaine Joyce, Sheb Wooley, Trish Van Devere, Rockne Tarkington, Pedro Gonzalez Gonzalez, Burt Reynolds, Jo Perkins, David Logan Rankin	United States	Comedy Western
1987
The Alamo: Thirteen Days to Glory	Burt Kennedy	James Arness, Brian Keith, Alec Baldwin, Raul Julia, Lorne Greene, Kathleen York, Isela Vega, Gene Evans, Noble Willingham, Buck Taylor, Grainger Hines, Tom Everett, Ethan Wayne, John Furlong, Laura Harring	United States	Made for television movie about the Battle of the Alamo
Desperado	Virgil W. Vogel	Alex McArthur, David Warner, Yaphet Kotto, Donald Moffat, Stephen Davies, Lise Cutter, Robert Vaughn, Gladys Knight, Pernell Roberts, Dirk Blocker	United States	B Western
Django 2	Nello Rossati	Franco Nero, Christopher Connelly, Donald Pleasence, Licia Lee Lyon, Robert Posse, Alessandro Di Chio, Rodrigo Obregón, Miguel Carreno, William Berger, Bill Moore, Consuelo Reina	Italy	Spaghetti Western
Extreme Prejudice	Walter Hill	Nick Nolte, Powers Boothe, Michael Ironside, María Conchita Alonso, Rip Torn, Clancy Brown, William Forsythe, Matt Mulhern, Larry B. Scott, Dan Tullis, Jr., John Dennis Johnston, Marco Rodríguez, Luis Contreras, Tommy "Tiny" Lister, Mickey Jones, Thomas Rosales Jr.	United States	Contemporary Western action thriller
The Gunfighters	Clay Borris	Art Hindle, Reiner Schoene, Tony Addabbo, George Kennedy, Michael Kane, Lori Hallier, Wendell Smith, Howard Kruschke, Francis Damberger, Beverly Hendry, Moira Wally, Dale Wilson, Bryan Fustukian, Eric Kramer, Blair Haynes, Alex Green, Paul Whitney, Mike Evans, Jay Smith, Dennis Robinson. Glenn Beck, James DeFelice, Tom Glass, Paul Wood, Kevin Smith	United States	
Gunsmoke: Return to Dodge	Vincent McEveety	James Arness, Amanda Blake, Steve Forrest, Buck Taylor, Earl Holliman, Fran Ryan, Ken Olandt, W. Morgan Sheppard, Patrice Martinez, Tantoo Cardinal, Mickey Jones	United States	Made for television Western (sequel to the TV series Gunsmoke)
Hawken's Breed	Charles B. Pierce	Peter Fonda, Jack Elam, Serene Hadin, Chuck Pierce Jr., Sue Ane Langdon, Dennis Fimple, Royce Clark, Bill Thurman, Robert Lewis, Walker Flame, Lisa Garrison, Charles B. Pierce	United States	
Independence	John Patterson	John Bennett Perry, Isabella Hoffmann, Sandy McPeak, Anthony Zerbe, R.G. Armstrong, Amanda Wyss, Stehanie Dunnam, Macon McCalman, Joshua Julian, Joseph Brutsman, Christian Clemenson	United States	Traditional Western
Kenny Rogers as The Gambler, Part III: The Legend Continues	Dick Lowry	Kenny Rogers, Bruce Boxleitner, Linda Gray, George Kennedy, Marc Alaimo, Michael Berryman, Melanie Chartoff, Richard Chaves, Matt Clark, Charles Durning, Dean Stockwell, Jeffrey Jones	United States	Traditional Western
La leyenda del manco	Jaime Casillas	Julio Alemán	Mexico	
A Man from the Boulevard des Capucines	Alla Surikova	Andrei Mironov	Soviet Union	Ostern
Near Dark	Kathryn Bigelow	Adrian Pasdar, Jenny Wright, Lance Henriksen, Bill Paxton, Jenette Goldstein, Joshua John Miller, Marcie Leeds, Tim Thomerson, Troy Evans, Roger Aaron Brown, James LeGros, Billy Beck, S.A. Griffin, Neith Hunter, Theresa Randle, Leo Geter	United States	Horror Western
Poker Alice	Arthur Allan Seidelman	Elizabeth Taylor, Tom Skerritt, George Hamilton, Richard Mulligan, David Wayne, Susan Tyrrell, Pat Corley, Paul Drake, Annabella Price, Mews Small, Gary Bisig, Liz Torres, Gary Grubbs, John Bennett Perry	United States	Traditional Western
Proud Men	William A. Graham	Charlton Heston, Peter Strauss, Nan Martin, Alan Autry, Belinda Balaski, Maria Mayenzet, Red West, Billy Ray Sharkey, Buck Taylor, Greg Kupiec, Dale Swann, Steve Whittaker, Mark McIntire, John Woodbridge, Bud Walls, Darren Prentice	United States	Traditional Western
Scalps!	Claudio Fragasso, Bruno Mattei	Vassili Karis, Alberto Farnese	Spain; Italy	
Straight to Hell	Alex Cox	Dick Rude, Sy Richardson, Courtney Love, Joe Strummer, Miguel Sandoval, Jennifer Balgobin, Sara Sugarman, Biff Yeager, Shane MacGowan, Spider Stacy, Terry Woods, Xander Berkeley, Kathy Burke, Elvis Costello, Del Zamora, Edward Tudor-Pole, Dennis Hopper, Jim Jarmusch, Grace Jones, Graham Fletcher-Cook, Anne-Marie Ruddock, Zander Schloss, Fox Harris	United Kingdom	Punk rock spaghetti Western
Timestalkers	Michael Schultz	William Devane, Lauren Hutton, John Ratzenberger, Forrest Tucker, Klaus Kinski, Tracey Walter, James Avery, R.D. Call, John Considine, Danny Pintauro, Gail Youngs, Patrik Baldauff, Ritch Brinkley, Michael Strasser, A.J. Freeman, Tim Russ, Terry Funk	United States	Science fiction Western
Walker	Alex Cox	Ed Harris, Richard Masur, René Auberjonois, Keith Szarabajka, Sy Richardson, Xander Berkeley, John Diehl, Peter Boyle, Marlee Matlin, Alfonso Arau, Pedro Armendáriz, Jr., Gerrit Graham, William O'Leary, Blanca Guerra, Miguel Sandoval, Dick Rude, Joe Strummer	United States; Mexico	Traditional Western
Yo soy el asesino	José Loza	Carlos Canto	Mexico	
1988
Alamo: The Price of Freedom	Kieth Merrill	Merrill Connally, Casey Biggs, Enrique Sandino, Steve Sandor, Don Swayze, Derek Caballero, Martin Cuellar	United States	Drama Western
Bonanza: The Next Generation	William F. Claxton	John Ireland, Robert Fuller, Barbara Anderson, Michael Landon, Jr., Brian A. Smith, John Amos, Peter Mark Richman, Gillian Greene, Kevin Hagen, William Benedict, Dabbs Greer, Rex Linn, Jerry Gatlin	United States	Made for television sequel to the TV series Bonanza
BraveStarr: The Movie	Tom Tataranowicz	Pat Fraley (voice), Charlie Adler (voice), Susan Blu (voice), Ed Gilbert (voice), Alan Oppenheimer (voice)	United States	Animated Western (based on TV series BraveStarr)
The Cowboy and the Frenchman	David Lynch	Harry Dean Stanton, Frederic Golchan, Jack Nance, Tracey Walter, Michael Horse, Rick Guillory, Patrick Houser, Marie Laurin, Eddy Dixon, Leslie Cook, Talisa Soto	United States	Short comedy Western
Desperado: Avalanche at Devil's Ridge	Richard Compton	Alex McArthur, Hoyt Axton, Alice Adair, Dwier Brown, Lise Cutter, Rod Steiger, John David Garfield, Laura Martinez Harring, Steven Schwartz-Hartley	United States	B Western
Ghost Town	Richard Governor	Franc Luz, Catherine Hickland	United States	Horror Western
The Good, the Bad, and Huckleberry Hound	John Kimball, Charles A. Nichols, Bob Goe, Jay Sarbry	Daws Butler (voice), Don Messick (voice), Michael Bell (voice), Allan Melvin (voice), Charlie Adler (voice), Pat Fraley (voice), B. J. Ward (voice), Frank Welker (voice), Pat Buttram (voice), Howard Morris (voice)	United States	Made for television animated Western (based on TV series The Huckleberry Hound Show)
Kasam	Umesh Mehra	Anil Kapoor, Poonam Dhillon, Kader Khan, Aruna Irani, Gulshan Grover, Pran	India	Action Western
Longarm	Virgil W. Vogel	Daphne Ashbrook, René Auberjonois, Diedrich Bader	United States	Made for television movie
The Man from Snowy River II	Geoff Burrowes	Tom Burlinson, Sigrid Thornton, Brian Dennehy, Nicholas Eadie, Mark Hembrow, Bryan Marshall, Rhys McConnochie, Peter Cummins, Cornelia Frances, Tony Barry, Wynn Roberts, Alec Wilson, Peter Browne, Alan Hopgood, Mark Pennell	Australia	Outback Western
The Milagro Beanfield War	Robert Redford	Rubén Blades, Richard Bradford, Sônia Braga, Julie Carmen, James Gammon, Melanie Griffith, John Heard, Carlos Riquelme, Daniel Stern, Christopher Walken, Chick Vennera, Freddy Fender, Tony Genaro, Jerry Hardin	United States	Contemporary Western
Once Upon a Texas Train	Burt Kennedy	Willie Nelson, Richard Widmark, Shaun Cassidy, Chuck Connors, Ken Curtis, Royal Dano, Jack Elam, Gene Evans, Kevin McCarthy, Dub Taylor, Stuart Whitman, Angie Dickinson, Don Collier, Harry Carey, Jr., Hank Worden	United States	Made for television outlaw Western
Red River	Richard Michaels	James Arness, Bruce Boxleitner, Gregory Harrison, Laura Johnson, Stan Shaw, Ray Walston, Ty Hardin, Robert Horton, John Lupton, Guy Madison, Burton Gilliam, L.Q. Jones	United States	Cattle drive Western
The Return of Desperado	E.W. Swackhamer	Alex McArthur, Robert Foxworth, Vanessa Bell Calloway, Vivian Bonnell, Charles Boswell, Hal Havins, Victor Love, Billy Dee Williams	United States	B Western
Stranger on My Land	Larry Elikan	Tommy Lee Jones, Jeff Allin, Richard Anderson, Michael Paul Chan, Joseph Gordon-Levitt, Dee Wallace, Barry Corbin, Terry O'Quinn, Pat Hingle, Michael Flynn, Ben Johnson	United States	Contemporany Western
Sunset	Blake Edwards	Bruce Willis, James Garner, Malcolm McDowell, Mariel Hemingway, Kathleen Quinlan, Jennifer Edwards, Patricia Hodge, Richard Bradford, M. Emmet Walsh, Joe Dallesandro, Andreas Katsulas, Michael C. Gwynne, Dermot Mulroney, Miranda Garrison, Liz Torres, Castulo Guerra, John Dennis Johnston, Peter Jason, Richard Fancy, Maureen Teefy	United States	Traditional Western
The Tracker	John Guillermin	Kris Kristofferson, Scott Wilson, Mark Moses, David Huddleston, John Quade, Don Swayze, Geoffrey Blake, Leon Rippy, Ernie Lively, Karen Kopins, Celia Xavier, Jeff Celentano, Jennifer Snyder, Brynn Thayer, Jose Rey Toledo, Kip Allen, John Barks, Michael D. Blum, Brook Gamble, Jerry Gardner, Lois Geary	United States	Traditional Western
War Party	Franc Roddam	Billy Wirth, Kevin Dillon, Tim Sampson, Jimmie Ray Weeks, Kevyn Major Howard, Jerry Hardin, Tantoo Cardinal, Bill McKinney, Guy Boyd, R.D. Call, William Frankfather, M. Emmet Walsh, Dennis Banks, Saginaw Grant, Rodney A. Grant	United States	Contemporary Western
Where the Hell's That Gold?	Burt Kennedy	Willie Nelson, Delta Burke, Jack Elam, Alfonso Arau, Gerald McRaney, Annabelle Gurwitch, John David Garfield	United States	Made for television comedy Western
Young Guns	Christopher Cain	Emilio Estevez, Kiefer Sutherland, Lou Diamond Phillips, Charlie Sheen, Dermot Mulroney, Casey Siemaszko, Terence Stamp, Jack Palance, Terry O'Quinn, Sharon Thomas, Alice Carter, Geoffrey Blake, Brian Keith, Tom Callaway, Patrick Wayne, Lisa Banes, Cody Palance, Victor Izay, Tom Cruise	United States	Outlaw Western
Zalzala	Harish Shah	Dharmendra, Shatrughan Sinha, Rajiv Kapoor, Anita Raj, Kimi Katkar, Vijayta Pandit, Rati Agnihotri, Danny Denzongpa	India	Action Western
1989
Billy the Kid	William A. Graham	Val Kilmer, Duncan Regehr, Wilford Brimley, Julie Carmen, Albert Salmi, Ned Vaughn, Ric San Nicholas, Gore Vidal, René Auberjonois	United States	Outlaw Western
Blood Red	Peter Masterson	Eric Roberts, Giancarlo Giannini, Dennis Hopper, Burt Young, Carlin Glynn, Lara Harris, Joseph Runningfox, Al Ruscio, Michael Madsen, Elias Koteas, Francesca De Sapio, Marc Lawrence, Frank Campanella, Aldo Ray, Gary Swanson, Susan Anspach, Kevin Cooney, Julia Roberts, Charles Dierkop	United States	Western drama filmed in 1986
Cabalgando con la muerte	Alfredo Gurrola	Mario Almada, Blanca Guerra	Mexico	
Desperado: Badlands Justice	E.W. Swackhamer	Alex McArthur, John Rhys-Davies, James B. Sikking, Gregory Sierra, Robert O'Reilly, Anne Curry, Edward Wiley, Deborah Slaboda, Leslie Neale, Geoffrey Rivas, Patricia Charbonneau, Seth Jaffee, Steve Eastin	United States	B Western
Desperado: The Outlaw Wars	E.W. Swackhamer	Alex McArthur, Richard Farnsworth, James Remar, Brad Dourif, Tom Bower, Whip Hubley, Brion James, Debra Feuer, Buck Taylor, Deon Richmond, Lise Cutter, Geoffrey Lewis	United States	B Western
El fugitivo de Sonora	Alfredo B. Crevenna	Mario Almada	Mexico	
El loco Bronco	Alberto Mariscal	Ramiro Orci, Hugo Stiglitz	Mexico	
Lonesome Dove	Simon Wincer	Robert Duvall, Tommy Lee Jones, Danny Glover, Diane Lane, Robert Urich, Frederic Forrest, D.B. Sweeney, Ricky Schroder, Anjelica Huston, Chris Cooper, Timothy Scott, Glenne Headly, Barry Corbin, William Sanderson, Steve Buscemi	United States	Traditional Western
Old Gringo	Luis Puenzo	Jane Fonda, Gregory Peck, Jimmy Smits, Patricio Contreras, Jenny Gago, Gabriela Roel, Sergio Calderón, Guillermo Ríos, Jim Metzler, Samuel Valadez De La Torre, Anne Pitoniak, Pedro Armendáriz Jr., Pedro Damián	United States	
Sundown: The Vampire in Retreat	Anthony Hickox	David Carradine, Bruce Campbell, Morgan Brittany, Jim Metzler, Maxwell Caulfield, Deborah Foreman, M. Emmet Walsh, John Ireland, Dana Ashbrook, John Hancock, Marion Eaton, Dabbs Greer, Bert Remsen, Sunshine Parker, Helena Carroll, Elizabeth Gracen, Christopher Bradley, George Buck Flower	United States	Horror Western

== See also ==
- List of TV Westerns
