= John Welsh (actor) =

Irish actor (1914–1985)

- Born: 7 November 1914; Wexford, County Wexford, Ireland
- Died: 21 April 1985 (aged 70); London, England
- Occupation: Actor
- Years active: 1940 -1985
- Spouse: Audry Vigne McDaniel
- Children: 3

John Welsh (7 November 1914 – 21 April 1985) was an Irish actor.

== Biography ==
Welsh was born in Wexford. After an early stage career in Dublin, he moved into British film and television in the 1950s. His roles included James Forsyte in the 1967 BBC dramatisation of John Galsworthy's The Forsyte Saga and Sir Pitt Crawley in Thackeray's Vanity Fair, as well as the waiter, Merriman in The Duchess of Duke Street, Sgt. Cuff in The Moonstone and a brief scene as the barber in Brideshead Revisited. He also appeared in Hancock's Half Hour, The Brothers, Prince Regent, To Serve Them All My Days, 'The Frighteners' ('Bed and Breakfast' episode, 1972), and The Citadel, and played the assistant chief constable in the early series of Softly, Softly. Welsh also appeared in a number of different roles in Danger Man that included British diplomats and butlers. He died in London.

== Filmography ==
- The Accused (1953) - Mr. Tennant
- The Clue of the Missing Ape (1953) - Army Intelligence Officer (uncredited)
- An Inspector Calls (1954) - Shop Walker
- Diplomatic Passport (1954) - US Embassy Official (uncredited)
- The Divided Heart (1954) - Chief Marshall
- Isn't Life Wonderful! (1954) - Uncle James
- The Dark Avenger (1955) - Gurd
- Confession (1955) - Father Neil
- Track the Man Down (1955) - 'Smiling' Sam (uncredited)
- Lost (1956) - Police Scientist (uncredited)
- The Man in the Road (1956) - George White - the Gamekeeper
- The Man Who Never Was (1956) - Bank Manager (uncredited)
- Women Without Men (A.K.A. Blonde Bait) (1956) - Prison Chaplain
- The Long Arm (1956) - House Agent at Shepperton
- The Counterfeit Plan (1957) - Police Insp. Grant
- The Secret Place (1957) - Mr. Christian (uncredited)
- Brothers in Law (1957) - Mr. Justice Fanshawe
- The Long Haul (1957) - Doctor
- Man in the Shadow (1957) - Inspector Hunt
- Lucky Jim (1957) - The Principal
- The Surgeon's Knife (1957) - Insp. Austen
- The Birthday Present (1957) - Chief Customs Officer
- The Man Who Wouldn't Talk (1958 film) (1958) - George Fraser (uncredited)
- The Safecracker (1958) - Inspector Owing
- Dunkirk (1958) - Staff Colonel
- Indiscreet (1958) - Passport Official (uncredited)
- The Revenge of Frankenstein (1958) - Bergman
- Next to No Time (1958) - Steve, Bar Steward
- She Didn't Say No! (1958) - Inspector
- Behind the Mask (1958) - Colonel Langley
- Nowhere to Go (1958) - Second Mr. Dodds (uncredited)
- Room at the Top (1959) - Mayor (uncredited)
- Operation Bullshine (1959) - Brigadier
- Bobbikins (1959) - Admiral
- The Rough and the Smooth (1959) - Dr. Thompson
- The Night We Dropped a Clanger (1959) - Squadron Leader Grant
- Beyond the Curtain (1960) - Turner
- The Trials of Oscar Wilde (1960) - Café Royal Manager
- Follow That Horse! (1960) - Major Turner
- Circle of Deception (1960) - Maj. Taylor
- Snowball (1960) - Ted Wylie
- Konga (1961) - First Plain Clothes Officer
- Francis of Assisi (1961) - Canon Cattanei
- Johnny Nobody (1961) - Judge
- Scotland Yard (film series) (1961) - The Square Mile Murder- Inspector Hicks
- Go to Blazes (1962) - Chief Fire Officer
- The Inspector (1962) - Agriculture Officer
- Fog for a Killer (1962) - Governor
- Life for Ruth (1962) - Marshall
- The Quare Fellow (1962) - Carroll
- The Wild and the Willing (1962) - Publican
- The Playboy of the Western World (1963) - Philly Cullen
- Nightmare (1964) - Doctor
- Rasputin: The Mad Monk (1966) - The Abbot
- The Forsyte Saga (1967) - James Forsyte
- Attack on the Iron Coast (1968) - Admiral of the Fleet Lord William Cansley
- Subterfuge (1968) - Heiner
- Journey into Darkness (1968) - Bart Brereton (episode 'Paper Dolls')
- The Man Who Haunted Himself (1970) - Sir Charles Freeman
- Cromwell (1970) - Bishop Juxon
- Catweazle (1971) - The Walking Trees - Colonel Arnold Dickenson
- Lord Peter Wimsey (TV series), (The Unpleasantness at the Bellona Club, episode) (1972) - Mr. Murbles
- The Pied Piper (1972) - Chancellor
- A Story of Tutankhamun (1973) - Grandfather
- Yellow Dog (1973) - Bewsley
- Edward the King (1975) - Duke of Wellington
- Play For Today (1975) ('The Saturday Party') - Philip
- Kizzy (1976) - Admiral Twiss Wellington
- The Duchess of Duke Street (1976-1977) - Merriman
- Grayeagle (1977) - Lum Stroud
- The Norseman (1978) - Norseman
- The Thirty Nine Steps (1978) - Lord Belthane
- Les soeurs Brontë (1979)
- To Serve Them All My Days (1980) - Cordwainer
- From a Far Country (1981) - Priest
- Brideshead Revisited (1981) - Barber
- Krull (1983) - The Emerald Seer
- Blott on the Landscape (1985) - Lord Leakham
