= Hawken's Breed =

- Directed by: Charles B. Pierce
- Written by: Charles B. Pierce
- Produced by: Sandye Garrison; Charles B. Pierce
- Cinematography: Chuck Bryant
- Edited by: Stephan Rathsack; Robert Raitano
- Music by: Guido & Maurizio De Angelis
- Production companies: MLG Properties, Inc.
- Distributed by: Vidmark Entertainment
- Release date: November 18, 1988 (United States)
- Running time: 89 minutes
- Country: United States
- Language: English

Hawken's Breed is a 1988 American independent Western film written and directed by Charles B. Pierce. Set in 1840s Tennessee, the film stars Peter Fonda as a drifter who rescues and a young Shawnee woman (Serene Hedin) and has to protect her from a fur hunter (Jack Elam) and his posse of hired killers.

== Cast ==
- Peter Fonda as Hawken
- Jack Elam as Tackett
- Serene Hedin as Spirit
- Chuck Pierce Jr. as Noel Hickman
- Sue Ane Langdon as Holly Clawson
- Royce Clark as Luke
- Dennis Fimple as Crowley
- Bill Thurman as Jeb Kline

== Production ==
Filming took place on location in and around the city of Dover, Tennessee, Roan Mountain State Park, and at the Land Between the Lakes National Recreation Area in 1985.
