= The Shadow of Chikara =

1977 American horror film

- Directed by: Earl E. Smith
- Screenplay by: Earl E. Smith
- Produced by: Earl E. Smith; Barbara Pryor
- Starring: Joe Don Baker; Sondra Locke; Ted Neeley; Dennis Fimple; John Davis Chandler; Linda Dano; Slim Pickens
- Cinematography: James W. Roberson
- Edited by: Tom Boutross
- Music by: Jaime Mendoza-Nava
- Production company: Farwinds Productions
- Distributed by: Howco International Pictures
- Release date: June 10, 1977
- Running time: 114 minutes
- Country: United States
- Language: English

The Shadow of Chikara (also known as Demon Mountain, The Ballad of Virgil Cane, Thunder Mountain, Wishbone Cutter, and The Curse of Demon Mountain) is a 1977 American horror Western film written and directed by Earl E. Smith. The film stars Joe Don Baker, Sondra Locke, Ted Neeley, Dennis Fimple, John Davis Chandler, Linda Dano and Slim Pickens. It features the song The Night They Drove Old Dixie Down by The Band.

== Plot ==
Confederate veterans of the last battle of the American Civil War team up with a geologist and set out to find a hidden treasure: diamonds hidden in a cave in an Arkansas mountain. However, the soldiers find they are being followed by a mysterious hunter (or hunters) who may have a connection to a mythic eagle spirit, Chikara.

== Cast ==
- Joe Don Baker as Wishbone Cutter
- Sondra Locke as Drusilla Wilcox
- Ted Neeley as Amos Richmond
- Dennis Fimple as Posey
- John Davis Chandler as Rafe
- Linda Dano as Rosalie Cutter
- Slim Pickens as Virgil Cane

== Production ==
The Shadow of Chikara is the first feature film ever shot on the Buffalo National River. Principal photography commenced on October 21, 1976, in Yellville, Arkansas. Production moved to Bull Shoals-White River State Park by early November and continued in the area for seven weeks. NBC affiliate KYTV of Springfield, Missouri aired a behind-the-scenes program on November 21, 1976.

Locke's then-boyfriend Clint Eastwood flew in about three weeks into the shoot and spent his days touring the countryside and fishing while she worked.

== Release ==
It was released on June 10, 1977, by Howco International Pictures.

== Home media ==
The film was released on DVD by Mill Creek Entertainment on July 5, 2005. It was later released by Dead Of Night on February 20, 2006. It was re-released by Mill Creek on September 12, that same year. In 2015, it was released by Movies Unlimited and Willette Acquisition Corp. on July 10, and 20th respectively.
