= Boggy Creek II: And the Legend Continues =

1984 film

- Theatrical release poster
- Directed by: Charles B. Pierce
- Written by: Charles B. Pierce
- Based on: Characters created by Earl E. Smith
- Produced by: Charles B. Pierce
- Starring: Charles B. Pierce; Cindy Butler; Charles "Chuck" Pierce, Jr. Serene Hedin; Jimmy Clem; James Faubus Griffith
- Cinematography: Shirak Kojayan
- Edited by: Shirak Kojayan
- Music by: Frank McKelvey; Lori McKelvey
- Distributed by: Howco International Pictures
- Release date: March 23, 1984 (Fort Lauderdale, Florida)
- Running time: 91 minutes
- Country: United States
- Language: English

Boggy Creek II: And the Legend Continues is a 1985 American monster horror film written, produced by, directed by, and starring Charles B. Pierce. It is the sequel to 1972's The Legend of Boggy Creek. Prior to the release of this film, an unofficial sequel to The Legend of Boggy Creek was made in 1977 titled Return to Boggy Creek. The "Big Creature" in the film was portrayed by Hollywood stuntman and bodyguard James Faubus Griffith. Unlike the original film, which was met with positive reviews, Boggy Creek II was largely panned by critics.

== Plot ==
Dr. Brian Lockhart is a professor of anthropology at the University of Arkansas. He receives a call from a sheriff, who reports sighting a Bigfoot-like creature near a remote town in southwestern Arkansas. Lockhart recruits the help of two of his students, Tim and Tanya, as well as Tanya's friend Leslie.

The group heads for an area near Boggy Creek, close to the town of Fouke, set up camp in the woods with a pop-up camper trailer, and secure their perimeter with a SONAR system. Lockhart sets about investigating the recent sighting, while relating to the group tales he had heard centered around locals who had encountered the creature, presented in flashbacks. The tales include:

- Rancher W.L. Slogan, who, while having lunch, mysteriously lost his herd of cattle and saw the creature leave the scene.
- Otis Tucker, who encountered the creature while repairing a flat tire on his vehicle. Tucker was rendered unconscious in the encounter and never came out of it in order to relate his story to others (how Lockhart then knows of it is unexplained).
- Retired attorney Oscar Colpotter, who was in an outhouse that was attacked by the creature, soiling his pants in the encounter.
- Deputy Williams, who encountered the creature and its offspring behind his home following a fishing trip, having fought with him before running off with his catch; this is the story Lockhart has come to investigate.

While talking with locals, Lockhart is met with resistance and disbelief by most. Of those willing to talk with him, he is directed to speak with "Old Man Crenshaw", who lives in a shack along the river bank. Lockhart and the others lease a boat and take off to meet Crenshaw. (The film portrays Crenshaw as a sexagenarian man, fitting the stereotypical notion of a hillbilly or mountain man, living alone on his property.) While somewhat welcoming to Lockhart and his entourage, he seems unwilling to talk too much about the creature, or why he is maintaining a series of bonfires on his land. A severe storm develops in the area, making river travel hazardous. This forces Lockhart and the students to stay overnight in Crenshaw's cabin.

Believing Lockhart to be a medical doctor, Crenshaw enlists his help in tending to an animal he has caught. To Lockhart's amazement, it is the offspring of the creature detailed in the sheriff's tale (i.e., the "Little Creature"). Lockhart hypothesizes that the Big Creature has been more hostile in the area recently due to the capture of its child, who is now near death. The Big Creature attacks the cabin in the night, knocking down the front door, compelling Lockhart to return the Little Creature. With its young in its arms again, the Creatures leave the cabin without further incident. The following morning, Crenshaw agrees with Lockhart's assessment that the Creatures should be left alone. Lockhart decides not to tell others about his experiences while in the Boggy Creek area and returns down the river with his students. Meanwhile, the Big Creature and its now-recovered offspring make their way back into the wilderness.

== Cast ==
- Charles B. Pierce as Dr. Brian C. Lockhart
- Cindy Butler as Leslie Ann Walker
- Chuck Pierce as Tim Thornton
- Jimmy Clem as Old Man Crenshaw
- Serene Hedin as Tanya Yazzie
- James Faubus Griffith as Big Creature

== Mystery Science Theater 3000 ==
The film was featured on the comedy series Mystery Science Theater 3000, as the sixth episode of season 10. The episode premiered on May 9, 1999. Bill Corbett, performer and writer on the show, said: "It's the kind of movie that seems to hate you; to wish you active harm; to kick sand in your eyes and make you cry. And for me, this was personified by Mr. Charles B. Pierce, who is apparently responsible for every single aspect, every nano-second of this cruel and unusual bit of celluloid. He chose to write and play a grim, hostile, condescending, know-it-all of a man, a character who is proven superior to everyone else in the story again and again, who drills his lousy stinking voice-over narrative into our heads every freaking minute of this film, and who then has the temerity to wrap his movie up suggesting his sour Nazi of a character is really an ecological servant of God".

In an article in Paste, writer Jim Vorel ranked the episode highly, placing it at #23 among MST3K episodes. (Note: Ranking based on 197 episodes as of 2018.) Vorel calls Boggy Creek II the show's "most Southern" episode, which Mike and the 'bots use to make jokes "about moonshine, Waffle Houses and the shirtless men who dwell in and around them." Crenshaw, writes Vorel, "is far scarier and more unpleasant to look at than any monster ever featured on MST3K."

The MST3K version of Boggy Creek II: And the Legend Continues was included as part of the Mystery Science Theater 3000 Collection, Vol. 5 DVD collection, released by Rhino and re-released by Shout! Factory on May 16, 2017. The other episodes in the collection are Time Chasers (episode #821), Merlin's Shop of Mystical Wonders (episode #1003), and The Touch of Satan (episode #908).
