= Jaime Mendoza-Nava =

- Born: December 1, 1925; La Paz, Bolivia
- Died: May 31, 2005 (aged 79); Los Angeles, California
- Occupations: composer and conductor

Jaime Mendoza-Nava (December 1, 1925 – May 31, 2005) was a Bolivian-American composer and conductor.

== Early life and work ==
Mendoza-Nava was born in La Paz, Bolivia. He studied at The Juilliard School and Madrid Royal Conservatory, the Sorbonne, and with Nadia Boulanger. He won the Madrid Conservatory's First Prize in 1950, completing the five-year program in a year's time. Eventually, he was on the staff of Walt Disney Studios and his works were recorded by MGM Records.

Much of his music is inspired by the pentatonic music of the Andes.

In Hollywood, he also had several credits as a sound editor.

He died in Los Angeles, California, on May 31, 2005.

Mendoza-Nava's grandson, Nic Mendoza (born April 4, 1989), is a music and multimedia producer. Nic is the founder of his production entity, Uprise LLC, and co-founder of a production company and record imprint, Encore Endeavor One (EE1). Nic is the Producer of Up, Up & Away! a musical fable, starring Marilyn McCoo, Billy Davis Jr. and The Next Dimension, and continues to work with the duo on their forthcoming project with BMG.

== Selected filmography ==
- Five Minutes to Love (1963)
- Orgy of the Dead (1965)
- The Black Klansman (1966)
- The Hostage (1967)
- Fever Heat (1985)
- The Stewardesses (1969)
- The Wild Scene (1970)
- Brother, Cry for Me (1970)
- Dream No Evil (1970)
- The Brotherhood of Satan (1971)
- Blood Legacy (1971)
- The Female Bunch (1971)
- The Legend of Boggy Creek (1972)
- Grave of the Vampire (1972)
- House of Terror (1973)
- Bootleggers (1974)
- Smoke in the Wind (1975)
- Aloha, Bobby and Rose (1975)
- Psycho From Texas (1975)
- The Winds of Autumn (1976)
- Creature from Black Lake (1976)
- The Town That Dreaded Sundown (1976)
- The Shadow of Chikara (1977)
- Grayeagle (1977)
- The Boys in Company C (1978)
- Vampire Hookers (1978)
- The Norseman (1978)
- The Evictors (1979)
- The Legend of Alfred Packer (1980)
- Mausoleum (1983)

== Works ==
- Tres Danzas Bolivianas for piano
- Concerto for Piano and Orchestra
- "La niña que toca el arpa" (piano and soprano singer)
- Don Alvaro (symphonic poem)
- Gitana for piano
- Antawara (symphonic poem)
- Pachamama (symphonic poem)
- Estampas y Estampillas for Orchestra of 'Cellos
- Western Overture for orchestra, opening music for CBS Apollo 11 coverage
