= Psycho from Texas =

1975 American horror film

- Directed by: Jack Collins, Jim Feazell
- Written by: Jim Feazell
- Produced by: Jack Collins, Jim Feazell, Sherry Feazell
- Cinematography: Paul Hipp
- Edited by: Arjay
- Music by: Jaime Mendoza-Nava
- Release date: 1975
- Country: United States
- Language: English

Psycho from Texas is a 1975 American low-budget horror film directed by Jack Collins and Jim Feazell. The plot concerns a hitman being hired to kill an oil baron, who escapes and runs for his life. The movie was filmed in El Dorado, Arkansas.

The original title was Wheeler when it first came out in 1975. It was then refilmed in 1978 featuring the Linnea Quigley sequence. This was one of Quigley's first film appearances. Later, Quigley related unhappy memories of the shoot: "They made me take my clothes off and poured beer on me. It was stupid."

The film's 1976 promotional stunt in New York City attracted attention. In 1990, the New York Daily News said "This obscure slasher [film] is best remembered from its cowboy-style promo campaign, when a loudspeaker-equipped truck bearing an outsized Psycho from Texas banner struck terror into unwary Times Square pedestrians when the pic premiered here back in '76."

== Top Cast ==
- Herschel Mays as William Phillips
- John King III as Wheeler
- Reed Johnson as Steve Foster
- Tommy Lamey as Slick
- Jack Collins as Sheriff Tom Peterson
- Joanne Bruno as Bertha
- Candy Dee as Connie Phillips
- Janel King as Ellen Peterson
- Harold Grimmett as Mr. Willis
- Roger Ellis as Banker
- Marland Proctor as Deputy Carl
- Linnea Quigley as Barmaid
- Donald Moran as Man in Bar

== Crew ==
- Directed by Jack Collins and Jim Feazell
- Written by Jim Feazell
- Produced by Jack Collins, Jim Feazell, and Sherry Feazell
- Music by Jaime Mendoza-Nava
- Cinematography by Paul Hipp
- Film Editing by Arjay
- Production Management by Ron Johnson
- Second Unit Director or Assistant Director by Marland Proctor
- Sound Department by Bill Nelson and Darcy Vebber
- Camera and Electrical Department by Doug Armstrong, Bob McVay, and Mike Petrich
- Script and Continuity Department by Jeanne Scott

== Reception ==
Variety said, "After going through various title changes including Wheeler, The Mama's Boy and The Hurting, picture emerges as a modest example of regional filmmaking, with amateurish direction and playing suitable for undiscriminating viewers."

The Creature Feature Movie Guide said, "[The movie] finally reached the screen with the impact of a redneck's double-barreled shotgun missing both firing pins... Watch this to ogle Leanna Quigley stripped naked by King III in the middle of an empty barroom and jiggle her breasts while he pours a pitcher of beer over her head. Watch for Jack Collins as the stereotyped sheriff, Joann Bruno as a screaming maid, and Tommy Lamey as a demented southerner named Slick who spends half the film chasing the overweight oilman through the swamp."

Even the box art on the video release attracted criticism, with The Deep Red Horror Handbook saying, "Really atrocious box art may alert the consumer to a film with an undeniable retard charm. Positively the worst tape box graphic ever is the one devised for Psycho From Texas (1974). The eyes of Charles Manson are superimposed over an autistic child's cut-outs of a cowboy hat and firing gun done in garish Romper Room primary colors. It complements perfectly the film contained therein, probably assembled by Tobe Hooper-styled inbreds, about a chubby maniac terrorizing a hick town mayor."
