= The Winds of Autumn =

1976 American western film

- Directed by: Charles B. Pierce
- Written by: Charles B. Pierce; Earl E. Smith
- Produced by: Steve Lyons; Tom Moore; Charles B. Pierce
- Starring: Dub Taylor; Jack Elam; Jeanette Nolan; Andrew Prine; Jimmy Clem
- Cinematography: James W. Roberson
- Edited by: Tom Boutross
- Music by: Jaime Mendoza-Nava
- Production company: Charles B. Pierce Films
- Distributed by: Howco International Pictures
- Release date: August 11, 1976
- Running time: 100 minutes
- Country: United States
- Language: English

The Winds of Autumn is a 1976 American Western film directed by Charles B. Pierce and starring Jack Elam, Jeanette Nolan and Andrew Prine.

== Plot ==
In 1884, after freeing a convict from a prison work detail, a family of outlaws take refuge with a Quaker family consisting of two parents, an eleven year old son, Joel, and a slightly older daughter. After the killing of the parents and daughter, Joel sets out on his own to seek revenge against the outlaws who senselessly murdered his family.

== Cast ==
- Jack Elam as J. Pete Hankins
- Jeanette Nolan as Ora Mae Hankins
- Andrew Prine as Wire Hankins
- Earl E. Smith as Mr. Pepperdine
- Chuck Pierce Jr. as Joel Rigney
- Jimmy Clem as Hog Hankins
- Belinda Palmer as Catherine Rigney
- Perry Harris as Lester Hankins
- Robert Birchall as Kermit Rigney
- Joyce Workman as Martha Rigney
- Charles B. Pierce as Ferd Hankins
- Cheri Johnson as Maydell
- Dub Taylor as Rattler S. Gravely
- Lisa Baker as Maydell's Girl
- Nancy Cameron as Maydell's Girl
- Daina House as Maydell's Girl
- Joyce Mandel as Maydell's Girl
- Ann Pennington as Maydell's Girl
- Martha Smith as Maydell's Girl
- Katie Willoughby as Maydell's Girl
- Linda Wickland as Maydell's Girl
- Laura Love as Maydell's Girl
- Flo Pierce as Maydell's Girl

== Bibliography ==
- Carlo Gaberscek & Kenny Stier. In Search of Western Movie Sites. 2014.
