= The Legend of Boggy Creek =

1972 American docudrama horror film

- Theatrical release poster
- Directed by: Charles B. Pierce
- Written by: Earl E. Smith
- Produced by: Charles B. Pierce
- Starring: William Stumpp; Chuck Pierce, Jr. Vern Stierman; Willie E. Smith
- Cinematography: Charles B. Pierce
- Edited by: Tom Boutross
- Music by: Jaime Mendoza-Nava
- Distributed by: Howco International Pictures
- Release date: August 23, 1972
- Running time: 87 minutes
- Country: United States
- Language: English
- Budget: $160,000
- Box office: $20,000,000 or $4.8 million

The Legend of Boggy Creek is a 1972 American independent docudrama horror film about the Fouke Monster, a humanoid creature reportedly seen in and around the rural community of Fouke, Arkansas. The film combines staged interviews with local residents who claim to have encountered the creature, along with reenactments of these encounters. Director and producer Charles B. Pierce secured funding from a local trucking company and hired local high school students to help complete the film. Made on a budget of $160,000, the film was released theatrically on August 23, 1972.

In 2019, a remastered version premiered after Pamula Pierce Barcelou, Pierce's daughter, acquired the rights to the film.

== Plot ==
The film claims to be a true story, detailing the existence of the Fouke Monster, a 7 ft 0 in (2.13 m)-tall Bigfoot-like creature that has reportedly been seen by residents of the small Arkansas community since the 1940s. It is described as being completely covered in reddish-brown hair, leaving three-toed tracks and having a foul odor.

Several locals from the small town of Fouke recall their stories, claiming that the creature has killed many large animals over the years. One farmer claims that the beast carried off two of his 100 lb (45 kg) pigs with little effort, leaping a fence with the animals tucked under its arm. In one scene, a kitten is shown as having been "scared to death" by the creature. The narrator informs the audience that people have shot at the creature in the past, but it has always managed to escape. In another sequence, hunters attempt to pursue the creature with dogs, but the dogs refuse to give chase. A police constable states that while driving home one night, the creature suddenly ran across the road in front of his car.

In a later sequence, culled from the actual newspaper accounts inspiring the film, the creature is shown menacing a family in a remote country house. After being fired upon, the creature attacks, sending one family member to the hospital.

The creature was never captured and is said to still stalk the swamps of southern Arkansas to this day.

== Cast ==
- Vern Stierman as narrator
- Chuck Pierce Jr. as young Jim
- William Stumpp as adult Jim
- Willie E. Smith as Willie
- Buddy Crabtree as James Crabtree
- Jeff Crabtree as Fred Crabtree
- Judy Haltom as Mary Beth Searcy
- Mary B. Johnson as Mary Beth's sister
- George Dobson as George
- Dave Hall as Dave
- Jim Nicklus as Jim
- Flo Pierce as Bessie Smith
- Glenn Carruth as Bobby Ford
- Bunny Dees as Mrs. Sue Ford
- John Wallis as Mr. Don Ford
- Aaron Ball as Baby Ford
- Sarah Coble as Mrs. Carter
- Dave O'Brien as Mr. Charles Turner
- Sarah Coble as Mrs. Ann Turner
- Billy Crawford as Corky Hill
- Dennis Lamb as Mr. Kennedy
- Loraine Lamb as Mrs. Kennedy
- Lloyd Bowen as himself
- B.R. Barrington as himself
- J.E. "Smokey" Crabtree as himself
- Travis Crabtree as himself
- John P. Hixon as himself
- John W. Oates as himself
- Herb Jones as himself
- Anthony Newsom as himself
- Cecil Newsom as himself
- Denise Newsom as herself

== Production ==
The Legend of Boggy Creek was filmed in Fouke, Arkansas, Shreveport, Louisiana, and Texarkana, Texas. The preproduction, script and shoot were mired in controversy regarding the unethical behavior of the writers and directors towards the locals whose stories were used. The book Smokey and the Fouke Monster by Smokey Crabtree (copyright 1974 ISBN 0-9701632-0-7) purports to explain what happened.

== Releases ==
=== Initial release ===
The Legend of Boggy Creek was released theatrically in 1972. Pierce's daughter Amanda Squitiero claims to have autobiographical notes made by her father indicating that the film ultimately made $25 million ($166 million in 2021 dollars), but this cannot be verified.

According to Variety, the film earned another $4.8 million in 1975 theatrical rentals in North America.

=== Home media ===
The Legend of Boggy Creek has had several releases both on VHS and DVD. Between 2002 and 2011, multiple companies released copies of The Legend of Boggy Creek on Region 1 DVD. For years, The Legend of Boggy Creek was thought to be in the public domain and all VHS/DVD releases unofficial. Pamula Pierce Barcelou, daughter of director Charles B. Pierce, gained control of the movie in 2018, when Steve Ledwell, of Ledwell & Son, assigned her copyright of both The Legend of Boggy Creek and another Pierce film, Bootleggers. Mr Ledwell's father, L.W., helped finance The Legend of Boggy Creek.

Ahead of the home release, the restored print received its theatrical premier at the historic Perot Theater, Texarkana, TX on June 14, 2019 with additional screenings at select theaters nationwide.

=== 2019 re-release ===
The Legend of Boggy Creek was restored/remastered at the George Eastman Museum, Rochester, New York, & Audio Mechanics, Burbank, California, using many of the original elements.

The remastered film premiered at the historic Perot Theatre, Texarkana, Texas, on Friday, June 14, 2019. Additional showings began at midnight, June 15, and continued through Sunday, June 16 (Charles B. Pierce Day in Texarkana, Arkansas and Texarkana, Texas).

The next screening took place in Phoenixville, Pennsylvania, on Friday, July 5 at the Colonial Theatre. Additional screenings followed at select theaters nationwide.

== Reception ==
The Legend of Boggy Creek received generally favorable reviews upon its initial release.

The Arkansas Gazette, Little Rock publication wrote a favorable review, stating: "Scene after scene of almost pristine wilderness is a visual feast... its sheer honest... rigid adherence to authenticity... is highly persuasive that there is indeed, a “Fouke Monster.” It's scary and charming..." Variety was also positive, stating the film was "visually stunning and exciting... Pierce manages to create a sense of foreboding that brings audiences up sharply..."

Glen Lovell of the Hollywood Reporter wrote: "the film captures the eerie beauty of Arkansas’ primeval swamps and contains images of Southern American backwoods life unmatched in its rich rustic flavor since Robert Flaherty's Louisiana Story... Pierce's photography accents the Arkansas swampland's incredible beauty and unsettling mystery... an unusual blend of malevolence and melancholia... eminently successful in giving the imagination a good healthy jolt and in ultimately celebrating the unfathomable mysteries of nature..."

== Legacy ==
A book was written about the film's production called Smokey and the Fouke Monster by Smokey Crabtree. It purports ethical issues with the production team and their treatment of locals' stories used in the film.

Writer and director Daniel Myrick cited The Legend of Boggy Creek as an influence on his 1999 film The Blair Witch Project.

=== Sequels and related films ===
In 1977, Return to Boggy Creek was released. It was directed by Tom Moore. Charles B. Pierce was not involved with the film's production, and the film carries over none of the original's docudrama elements. It stars Dawn Wells and Dana Plato. Wells portrays the mother of three children who become lost in the swamp until the creature comes to their rescue.

In 1985 Boggy Creek II: And the Legend Continues was released. Pierce returned to direct this film which is a direct sequel to the original film, ignoring Return to Boggy Creek. It follows the adventures of a University of Arkansas professor (Pierce) and his students, one of which is Pierce's son, on their trip to Fouke, Arkansas, to find and study the creature. A few scenes in the beginning of the movie were shot at the university, including an Arkansas Razorbacks football game. The movie was featured in an episode of Mystery Science Theater 3000. The "Big Creature" in the film was portrayed by James Faubus Griffith, a Hollywood stuntman, actor and bodyguard.

In 2010, Boggy Creek, a film with no narrative connection to the original or its 1985 sequel, was released as a straight-to-DVD movie. It concerns a Bigfoot-like creature who attacks a group of teenagers that are vacationing in the fictional area of Boggy Creek, Texas. The film was written and directed by Brian T. Jaynes. It was originally produced in 2010 and released on September 13, 2011.

The Legacy of Boggy Creek, another unrelated film inspired by the original, was released in 2011.

== See also ==
- Creature from Black Lake, 1976 film
- Peter C. Byrne
