= Bootleggers (1974 film) =

1974 film by Charles B. Pierce

- Directed by: Charles B. Pierce
- Starring: Paul Koslo; Dennis Fimple
- Cinematography: Tak Fujimoto
- Music by: Jaime Mendoza-Nava
- Release date: 1974
- Country: United States
- Language: English
- Box office: $5.3 million (US)

Bootleggers is a 1974 American comedy-drama film directed by Charles B. Pierce and starring Paul Koslo and Dennis Fimple.

== Plot ==
Bootleggers (also released as Deadeye Dewey and the Arkansas Kid) is a period piece crime comedy drama set in the rural Arkansas Ozarks. The first part of the film is set 1921, where 10-year-old Othar Pruitt witnesses his bootlegger father being murdered by a member of a rival bootlegger family. The film then skips forward to 1933 which details the adult Othar and his partner-in-crime, Dewey Crenshaw, who make a living as moonshiners and cross-state bootleg runners. The film follows an episodic plotline of Othar and Dewey working Othar's grandfather's distillery on the Buffalo River, harassing the local sheriff who demands bribes from the bootleggers, flirting with various women at local social ho-downs, and continuing to clash against the rival Woodall family, their chief competitors for control of the bootlegged trail runs. When Grandpa Pruitt is murdered by the Woodall clan, Othar and Dewey decide to take matters into their own hands, leading to a climatic shootout with the Woodall family. In the end, Othar kills the remaining members of the Woodall family and is arrested by the sheriff for murder. The closing credits scene shows Othar and Dewey driving moonshine once again.

== Cast ==
- Paul Koslo as Othar Pruitt
- Dennis Fimple as Dewey Crenshaw
- Slim Pickens as Grandpa Pruitt
- Jaclyn Smith as Sally Fannie Tatum
- Seamon Glass as Rufus Woodall
- Betty Bluett as Grandma Pruitt
- Steve Ward as Silas Pruitt
- James Tennison as Mr. Slayton
- Charles B. Pierce as Homer Dodd
- Steve Lyons as Deputy Carl Duggins
- Buddy Ledwell as Mr. McClusky
- Chuck Pierce Jr. as Othar Pruitt as a boy

== Reception ==
The film grossed over $5.3 million in the United States.
