= Charles B. Pierce =

American filmmaker and actor (1938–2010)

- Pierce in Boggy Creek II: And the Legend Continues (1985)
- Born: June 16, 1938; Hammond, Indiana, U.S.
- Died: March 5, 2010 (aged 71); Erin, Tennessee, U.S.
- Other names: Charles R. Pierce; Charles Pierce; Chuck Pierce
- Occupations: Actor, director, screenwriter, producer, set decorator, cinematographer
- Years active: 1966–1998
- Spouse(s): Florene Lyons (divorced); Cindy Butler (divorced); Beth Pulley Pierce

Charles Bryant Pierce (June 16, 1938 – March 5, 2010) was an American film director, screenwriter, producer, set decorator, cinematographer, and actor. Pierce directed thirteen films over the span of 26 years, but is best known for his cult hits The Legend of Boggy Creek (1972) and The Town That Dreaded Sundown (1976).

An Arkansas resident most of his life, Pierce made his directorial debut with Boggy Creek, a faux documentary-style film inspired by the legend of the Bigfoot-like Fouke Monster. Pierce followed that with several inexpensive, regional films set in the southern United States, including The Town That Dreaded Sundown, based on the true story of the Phantom Killer murders in Texarkana.

Pierce continued directing films into the 1980s. He is credited with co-writing the story for the Clint Eastwood film Sudden Impact (with Earl E. Smith). After years of pressure from producers, Pierce directed a Boggy Creek sequel, Boggy Creek II: And the Legend Continues, which he considered the worst film of his career. It was later riffed on by the comedy television series Mystery Science Theater 3000.

== Early life ==
I've always said that to be a decent director, you had to play well as a kid. I played cowboys and Indians and cars, built stick bridges and roads.

— Charles B. Pierce

Charles B. Pierce was born in Hammond, Indiana, on June 16, 1938, one of the three sons of Mack McKenny Pierce and Mayven Bryant Pierce. His family moved to the southwestern Arkansas city of Hampton when he was just a few months old. There he was a childhood friend and neighbor of future film and television director Harry Thomason, and the two made home movies together in their backyards using an old 8 mm camera. His first professional foray into media entertainment was in the mid-1960s as an art director at KTAL-TV in Shreveport, Louisiana. He later became a weatherman and hosted a children's cartoon show for that channel.

Pierce continued working in production jobs at television stations in Arkansas, Louisiana and Texas until 1969, when he moved to Texarkana, bought a 16 mm camera and started an advertising agency. He started a contract with Ledwell & Son Enterprises, a Texarkana-based firm that built 18-wheel trailers and farm equipment. Pierce developed commercials for the company that played throughout the Southwestern United States, using mostly footage he shot of trucks on the highway and farming equipment being used. He said the reputation he developed with those commercials later helped him launch his film career. Also during this time, Pierce played a character named Good Time Charlie, later Mayor Chuckles, on The Laffalot Club, also on KTAL-TV, a local Arkansas children's television show. Pierce launched his independent film career in the early 1970s, when he sought funding from L.W. Ledwell, the owner of Ledwell & Son Enterprises. Ledwell was skeptical of the idea, but ultimately agreed to provide about $100,000 of the $160,000 budget for Pierce's first film. Prior to his directorial debut, Pierce worked as a set decorator for television shows like the Western series Hondo and for films like Waco (1966) and Coffy (1973).

== The Legend of Boggy Creek ==
Pierce's directorial debut was The Legend of Boggy Creek, which was inspired by the Fouke Monster, a seven-foot-tall Bigfoot-like creature said to live in the swamps near Fouke, Arkansas. Pierce said he did not necessarily believe in the legend, but was fascinated with the stories. After interviewing Fouke residents who said they encountered the monster, Pierce became impressed with their authenticity and down-to-earth qualities. He approached Earl E. Smith, an acquaintance from the advertising business, to adapt those eyewitness tales into a screenplay. The film was shot at locations in Fouke, Texarkana and Shreveport, using a camera Pierce built himself at home. It was filmed in a faux documentary style, and included interviews with Fouke residents mixed with dramatizations of their supposed encounters with the creature. Like Pierce, the film's financial backers and many of the actors had never been involved in a film before.

Pierce cast the actors by approaching customers at a local gas station whenever he saw somebody that looked like they fit one of the parts. He hired high school students as crew members who helped load and move equipment. For the creature itself, he limited the sightings to shadowy figures because he felt the film would be more frightening if the creature was left to the viewer's imagination. Pierce sang the theme song featured in the film. Once the film was completed, he put the reel into the trunk of his car and drove to Los Angeles seeking post-production services. He met Jamie Mendoza-Nava, who owned a small post-production company and agreed to work on the film for limited up-front pay and a small percentage of the film's box-office receipts. Pierce could not find a major studio willing to distribute it, so he rented a local movie theater in Texarkana for one week to screen the film. He cleaned the property himself to prepare for the debut.

Released in 1972, The Legend of Boggy Creek premiered at what was later called the Perot Theatre, where lines stretched around the block to see it. Pierce did not expect it to become a financial success, but it made $55,000 in the first three weeks from that single theater. Eventually, Pierce entered into a distribution deal with Joy N. Houck, owner of the independent distribution company Howco, who paid Pierce $1.29 million for a 50 percent interest in the film. Pierce and Houck signed with American International Pictures for foreign and television distribution. It became a hit at drive-in movie theaters, eventually gaining a cult status and bringing Pierce a modicum of fame. At the time of the film's release, Pierce incorrectly predicted to newspapers that it would win several Academy Awards. Several similarly styled films about strange and allegedly true phenomena were released in subsequent years due to success of The Legend of Boggy Creek. Julius E. "Smokey" Crabtree, a Fouke resident who appeared as himself in the film, became disgruntled with the production company and filed a lawsuit against Pierce and his financial supporters. Pierce declined to speak to the media about the suit.

== Post-Boggy Creek career ==
I didn't want to do another Boggy Creek, not for a while. I was still trying to prove myself as a filmmaker; I didn't want to have to turn around and shoot the same thing all over again. I wanted to do something different.

— Charles B. Pierce

Following the success of The Legend of Boggy Creek, Pierce was encouraged to film a sequel, but resisted because he wanted to prove himself as a filmmaker rather than duplicate the same idea. He continued to make inexpensive regional films set in the southern United States, primarily targeting small-town and rural audiences. His family said Pierce liked to be continuously working and would start a new film immediately after finishing the last. His sophomore effort was Bootleggers (1974), a period action-comedy film about rival families making moonshine in the Ozark Mountains. It featured Slim Pickens and the first major performance of Jaclyn Smith, who went on to play Kelly Garrett in the television series Charlie's Angels. Pierce followed that film up with two Westerns released in 1976. The first, Winterhawk, was about violence erupting between Blackfoot Native Americans and white villagers. The film proved difficult for Pierce to shoot due to challenges from the weather and problems with the horses on the set. However, according to Pierce, Winterhawk was more widely seen than The Legend of Boggy Creek. His second Western was Winds of Autumn. Pierce co-wrote both films with his Boggy Creek partner, Earl E. Smith. Pierce made a trademark of casting his friends in his films, and Pierce himself performed minor roles in both Winterhawk and Winds of Autumn. During this period, Pierce continued working as a set decorator for films such as Black Belt Jones (1974).

Pierce returned to the horror genre with the 1976 film The Town That Dreaded Sundown, based on the true story of the Phantom Killer, an unidentified serial killer who murdered five people in Texarkana in 1946. Pierce remembered being scared by news stories about the killer during his youth in Hampton. He received some criticism for the graphic violence portrayed in the film, particularly one scene where the killer ties a woman to a tree, attaches a knife to the end of a trombone, then repeatedly stabs her while playing the instrument. Pierce said he purposely made the film violent because he felt the real-life situation was horrific and did not want to glaze over it. While filming horror scenes, he tried to create a suspenseful mood by clearing the set of everyone but the essential cast and staff, then refusing to let them talk to each other as the scenes were shot. Pierce appeared in The Town That Dreaded Sundown as police Patrolman A.C. "Spark Plug" Benson, an idiotic comic relief character. The name "Spark Plug" was a real-life nickname given to the director due to his energy. Pierce described The Town That Dread Sundown as a very easy and enjoyable shoot with no major problems on the set.

During this period, Pierce worked as set decorator on films The Outlaw Josey Wales (1976) and The Cheap Detective (1978). The year after The Town That Dreaded Sundown, Piece directed and co-wrote Grayeagle, a Western based on a Cheyenne legend of a white man whose child (with an Indian wife) is kidnapped by a young warrior named Grayeagle. Pierce appeared in the film as Bugler, a half-insane white man who takes on a Shoshone identity. He then wrote and directed The Norseman (1978), which starred Lee Majors as a Viking prince who traveled to America to rescue his father from Indians. Working with a multimillion-dollar budget, Pierce shot the film in the Florida locations Hillsborough River State Park and New Port Richey. The next year he co-wrote and directed The Evictors (1979), another documentary-style horror film about a young couple who move into a rural Louisiana farmhouse and find their lives endangered by a series of strange events. Pierce was inspired to write the script after reading a true story in a detective magazine about a Kansas family who murdered somebody trying to evict them from the property. In order to match the late-evening sunlight in his cinematography at the farmhouse set, Pierce set up reflectors outside and deflected the sunlight through the windows, which were fitted with sheer white curtains to give the actors an eerie glow. The Evictors was little-seen and did not do financially well, which was a disappointment to distributor American International Pictures, but Pierce believed it one of his better films. He also considered it his most downbeat film, and said of the unhappy ending, "I probably just didn't have any other way to end it."

== Later career ==
In the 1980s, to further his career as a filmmaker, Pierce moved to Carmel, California, where he met and befriended actor Clint Eastwood. Pierce shared a film treatment he had developed with Eastwood, who liked the story and helped Pierce develop it into Sudden Impact (1983), the fourth entry in Eastwood's Dirty Harry film series. Pierce was given a writer's credit for the story along with Earl E. Smith. Joseph C. Stinson is credited with the screenplay. Pierce claims to have written the phrase, "Go ahead, make my day," the film's most famous line, which went on to be identified as one of the ten best movie quotes of all time by the American Film Institute. The phrase was inspired by something his father once told Pierce in his youth while encouraging his son to mow the lawn: "When I come home tonight and the yard has not been mowed, you're going to make my day." However, whether Pierce truly invented the phrase has been brought into question, since the same line was used in the action-drama film Vice Squad (1982) the previous year. Around this time, Pierce also directed Sacred Ground (1983), which was released the same year as Sudden Impact.

I really didn't want to do Boggy Creek II. I think it's probably my worst picture. This time, I spent almost as much on the creature suit as I did on the film itself. ... I played too big a role in the picture, and I had too many of my friends in it. It's all right, but it's not one of my favorites.

— Charles B. Pierce

In 1985, Pierce released a sequel to The Legend of Boggy Creek called Boggy Creek II: And the Legend Continues. American International Pictures had been encouraging him to make a Boggy Creek sequel for years because they believed it would be financially profitable, but he was resistant to the idea. He did not participate in an earlier sequel, Return to Boggy Creek (1977), which was directed by Tom Moore, and did not like the final film. In his own Boggy Creek II: And the Legend Continues, Pierce starred as an anthropologist who brings three students on an expedition into the bayou to track down the creature. His son, Chuck Pierce Jr., co-starred as Tim, one of the students. Pierce ultimately considered Boggy Creek II his worst film, believing his own role was too large and that he cast too many of his friends in supporting roles. Boggy Creek II was featured in a 1999 episode of Mystery Science Theater 3000, a comedy television series in which the characters watch and make jokes about bad films. The episode ultimately increased Pierce's visibility to a wider audience.

Pierce largely fell from the movie industry's public eye shortly after the release of Boggy Creek II. In 1987, he directed Hawken's Breed, a Western film starring Peter Fonda as a drifter who meets and rescues a young Shawnee woman. While shooting that film, Pierce met the woman who became his second wife, Beth Pulley. In 1996, he directed Renfroe's White Christmas, an adaptation of the classic children's book Renfroe's Christmas. Starting in 1997, he began production on his western film Chasing the Wind (1998), a gritty epic about a mountain man. It proved to be Pierce's final directorial effort, although he continued working as a set decorator for several television shows including MacGyver, Remington Steele, The Twilight Zone and Fresno, a Carol Burnett miniseries parodying prime time soap operas. Pierce's work on the latter show earned him a Primetime Emmy Award nomination for Outstanding Art Direction for a Miniseries or a Special.

Pierce began writing the screenplay for a sequel to The Town That Dreaded Sundown, but the film never came to fruition. Around 2008, while developing the horror film The Wild Man of the Navidad, directors Duane Graves and Justin Meeks sought out Pierce, who they cited as a major influence on their work. Graves and Meeks wanted Pierce to work as a consultant on the film, but he turned them down because, according to Graves, "if he's not running the show, he's not interested."

== Death and legacy ==
He really did change the face of filmmaking. With his model, many filmmakers became successful with the drive-in creature feature, so to speak.

— Christopher Crane
Arkansas Film Commissioner

In 2008, Pierce was honored at the Little Rock Film Festival, where festival producers screened a retrospective of his films, and presented him with a Lifetime Achievement Award. Also that year, the festival's best film award was renamed in his honor to the Charles B. Pierce Award for Best Film Made in Arkansas, In October 2009, the Arkansas Arts Council honored Pierce with the Judges' Special Recognition Award at the Governor's Arts Awards ceremony in Hot Springs. Pierce died of natural causes on March 5, 2010, at the Signature Care nursing home in Dover, Tennessee, where he had moved a few years earlier. He was 71. Pierce directed thirteen films over the span of 26 years. He was considered one of the first modern independent filmmakers, and was credited with breaking new ground for other independent filmmakers, particularly for the Arkansas film industry.

Director Harry Thomason, Pierce's childhood friend and neighbor, praised him for finding success independently at a time when the film industry was so controlled by major studios. Daniel Myrick, co-director of the documentary-style The Blair Witch Project (1999), said he was strongly influenced by The Legend of Boggy Creek, which was one of his favorite films growing up. Myrick said he and fellow Blair Witch director Eduardo Sánchez wanted to "tap into the primal fear generated by the fact-or-fiction format like Legend of Boggy Creek". In an Orlando Sentinel article that ran on Halloween, Myrick identified The Legend of Boggy Creek as the one film that most inspired him. On September 2, 2010, Pierce was inducted into the Arkansas Entertainers Hall of Fame in a ceremony at the Arkansas Governor's Mansion in Little Rock.

Pierce is part of the plot of the 2014 film The Town That Dreaded Sundown, a meta-sequel to Pierce's 1976 film of the same name. The 2014 film is not a remake, but rather features the original film as part of its storyline: it is set in Texarkana, and includes a series of murders committed by someone posing as the Phantom Killer as depicted in the 1976 film. The new film opens with a brief summary mentioning Pierce and the impact of his original The Town That Dreaded Sundown. Pierce is also discussed by characters in the new film, and a fictionalized version of his son, Charles B. Pierce, is portrayed by Denis O'Hare as a crackpot with conspiracy theories about the killer and his father's film. The real-life Charles B. Pierce Jr. also makes a cameo in the film as a different character.

== Personal life ==
Pierce was married to Florene Lyons Pierce for 17 years and they had three children: Pamula Pierce Barcelou, Charles Bryant Pierce Jr., and Amanda Pierce Squitiero, along with six grandchildren. Pierce briefly married Cindy Butler, who appeared in several of his movies - The Town That Dreaded Sundown, Grayeagle and Boggy Creek II: And the Legend Continues; they also later divorced. He later married Beth Pulley, gaining two stepdaughters: Betsy Mathis Gillespie and Melissa Mathis Daley, and three step-grandchildren. Pierce was a fan of the Arkansas Razorbacks, the University of Arkansas college sports teams.

== Selected filmography ==
Film
Year	Title	Role	Notes
1966	Waco		Set decorator
1966	An Eye for an Eye		Set decorator
1970	The Strawberry Statement		Set decorator
1970	The Phantom Tollbooth		Set decorator
1970	Dirty Dingus Magee		Set decorator
1971	Pretty Maids All in a Row		Set decorator
1972	The Legend of Boggy Creek		Director, cinematographer, producer
1973	Coffy		Set decorator
1973	Dillinger		Set decorator
1974	Bootleggers	Homer Dodd	Director, writer, producer
1974	Black Belt Jones		Set decorator
1976	Winterhawk		Director, writer
1976	The Winds of Autumn		Director
1976	The Town That Dreaded Sundown	Patrolman A.C. Benson	Director, producer
1977	Grayeagle	Mad Bugler	Director, writer
1978	The Norseman		Director, writer
1978	The Cheap Detective		Set decorator
1979	The Triangle Factory Fire Scandal		Set decorator
1979	The Evictors		Director, producer, writer
1983	Sacred Ground		Director, cinematographer
1985	Boggy Creek II: And the Legend Continues	Professor Brian C. "Doc" Lockart	Director, producer, writer
1987	Hawken's Breed	Noel Hickman as an old man	Director, producer, writer
1996	Renfroe's White Christmas		Director
1998	Chasing the Wind		Director

Year	Title	Role	Notes
1966	T.H.E. Cat		Set decorator 1 episode
1966	Please Don't Eat the Daisies		Set decorator 1 episode
1986	The Ellen Burstyn Show		Set decorator 1 episode
1986	Fresno		Set decorator Miniseries
1991	MacGyver		Set decorator 8 episodes
