= Lost (1983 film) =

- Directed by: Al Adamson
- Written by: Don Buday
- Produced by: Andy and Beverly Innes; Corey Allen
- Cinematography: Gary Graver
- Production company: American National Enterprises
- Release date: 1983
- Running time: 92 minutes
- Country: United States
- Language: English

Lost is a 1983 low-budget movie directed by Al Adamson. It stars Sandra Dee, Gary Kent and Jack Elam. This was Dee's last film role, and the last film released to theatres that Adamson directed.

== Plot ==
Jeff Morrison, his new wife Penny and step-daughter Buddy move from the city to the Utah mountains. Relationships within the new family are tested by the condition of their new home which is nothing more than a dilapidated shack, Buddy's new situation of having both a father (contacted via telephone) and step-father, and the introduction of farm animals to the city-raised women. When Buddy's pet burro needs to be euthanized she runs off, getting lost in the mountains.

An initial search party is unable to locate the missing girl. Buddy is chased by a cougar, jumps into a river injuring herself, and is eventually found by Mr. Newsome, a reclusive mountain man. After initial distrust, Buddy lets the man care for her injury and listens to his stories through the evening. The next day Jeff starts looking for Buddy using a rented airplane, eventually finding her. Happy for her rescue, they return home together.

== Cast ==
- Sandra Dee as Penny Morrison
- Gary Kent as Stokes
- Jack Elam as Mr. Newsome
- Ken Curtis as Wyatt Cosgrove, the Morrison's neighbor
- Sheila Newhouse as Buddy Morrison
- Don Stewart as Jeff Morrison

== Production ==
Lost was filmed on location in Utah and Colorado.
