= Sacred Ground (film) =

1983 film

- Theatrical release poster
- Directed by: Charles B. Pierce
- Written by: Charles B. Pierce
- Produced by: Arthur R. Dubs
- Starring: Tim McIntire; L. Q. Jones; Jack Elam
- Cinematography: Charles B. Pierce
- Edited by: David E. Jackson; Stephen L. Johnson (as Steven L. Johnson); Lynne Southerland
- Music by: Don Bagley; Gene Kauer
- Production company: Wilderness Family Inc.
- Distributed by: Pacific International Enterprises
- Release date: January 28, 1983
- Running time: 100 minutes
- Country: United States
- Language: English

Sacred Ground is a 1983 American Western film directed by Charles B. Pierce and starring Tim McIntire, L. Q. Jones and Jack Elam. The film was shot in several outdoor locations in Oregon.

== Plot ==
Set in the year 1861, Matt Colter, a mountain man, is traveling across the great divide with his young Native bride, Little Doe. As they cross paths with a Paiute party, a beautiful young woman Wannetta watches the mountain man and his pretty Native bride. Ostracized by the white and Native communities, they are forced to leave and find a new home. They come across a trading post where the owner warns Matt about traveling through Paiute country.

The couple travels further, and after crossing a river they come across the ruins of a cabin. Matt and Little Doe rebuild the cabin and make it their home. Seasons change, and Matt affectionately pats his wife's belly as Little Doe is expecting. Little Doe finds bone remains and later tells Matt that that unbeknownst to him that the cabin they rebuiltis on a sacred Paiute burial ground. Little Doe tells Matt that the spirits of the ground surround her and her unborn child.

One day a Paiute party calls on Matt and yells. Due to the language barrier, they are unable to communicate. As Matt retreats back into the cabin, Little Doe goes into labor. The Paiutes attack the couple by destroying the cabin with little Doe inside. In labor, Little Doe is fatally injured and Matt pulls her out of the destroyed cabin. Matt carries his wife to the river as the Paiute warriors look on. Many Paiute women are crossing the river to bury their own dead near the destroyed cabin. As the Paiute party lifts their dead onto the scaffolds, they pray and sing. The beautiful woman who lost her child holds up her dead baby's cradleboard up to the scaffold. Matt is helping Little Doe deliver their child as she dies. Suddenly the young baby cries as the Paiutes leave their sacred burial ground.

Matt leaves with his newborn baby and meets with a lone mountain man who tells him that he needs to feed the child. Wannetta has recently had a child, but it had died. Matt and the crazy mountain man kidnap her to use as a wet nurse. She nurses and bonds with the baby. The Paiute war party later places a signal for Wannetta to kill the mountain man's horse so they will be forced to travel on foot. She does not and she and the child are later kidnapped by the Paiute war party.

Wannetta is later banished from the tribe as she disobeyed them for not killing the horse. She is stripped of her furs and told to leave. Both women and men yell and throw rocks at her. Determined to find his son, Colter seeks the help of his friend, mountain man Lum Witcher.

== Cast ==
- Tim McIntire as Matt Colter
- L. Q. Jones as Tolbert Coleman
- Jack Elam as Lum Witcher
- Mindi Miller as Wannetta
- Elroy Phil Casados as Prairie Fox
- Serene Hedin as Little Doe
- Lefty Wild Eagle as Medicine Man
- Larry Kenoras as Brave Beaver
- Vernon Foster as Wounded Leg
- Franklin Fritz as Baby Colter
- Danny Wilson as Lone Brave
- Ben Mitchell as Warriors
- Jerald Jackson, Jr. as Warriors
- Ronnie Wilson as Warriors
- Aaron Wright as Warriors
- Randy Sheppard as Warriors
- Donald Wilson as Warriors
- Thurman Parrish as Warriors
- Lesile Anderson as Warriors
- Fernando Herrera as Warriors
- Darin Wright as Warriors
- Arnold Gallagher as Warriors
- Cora Lee Joe as Native Woman
- Della Wilson as Native Woman
- Marjorie Jackson as Native Woman
- Natalie Jackson as Native Woman
- Mary Sheppard as Native Woman
- Bergie Jackson as Native Woman
- Glenda Foster as Native Woman
- Laura Hecocta as Native Woman
- Adeline Jackson as Native Woman

== DVD details ==
- Release date: January 1, 2003
- Full Screen
- Region: 1
- Aspect Ratio: 1.33:1
- Audio tracks: English
- Subtitles: English
- Running time: 100 minutes
