= Dennis Fimple =

American actor (1940–2002)

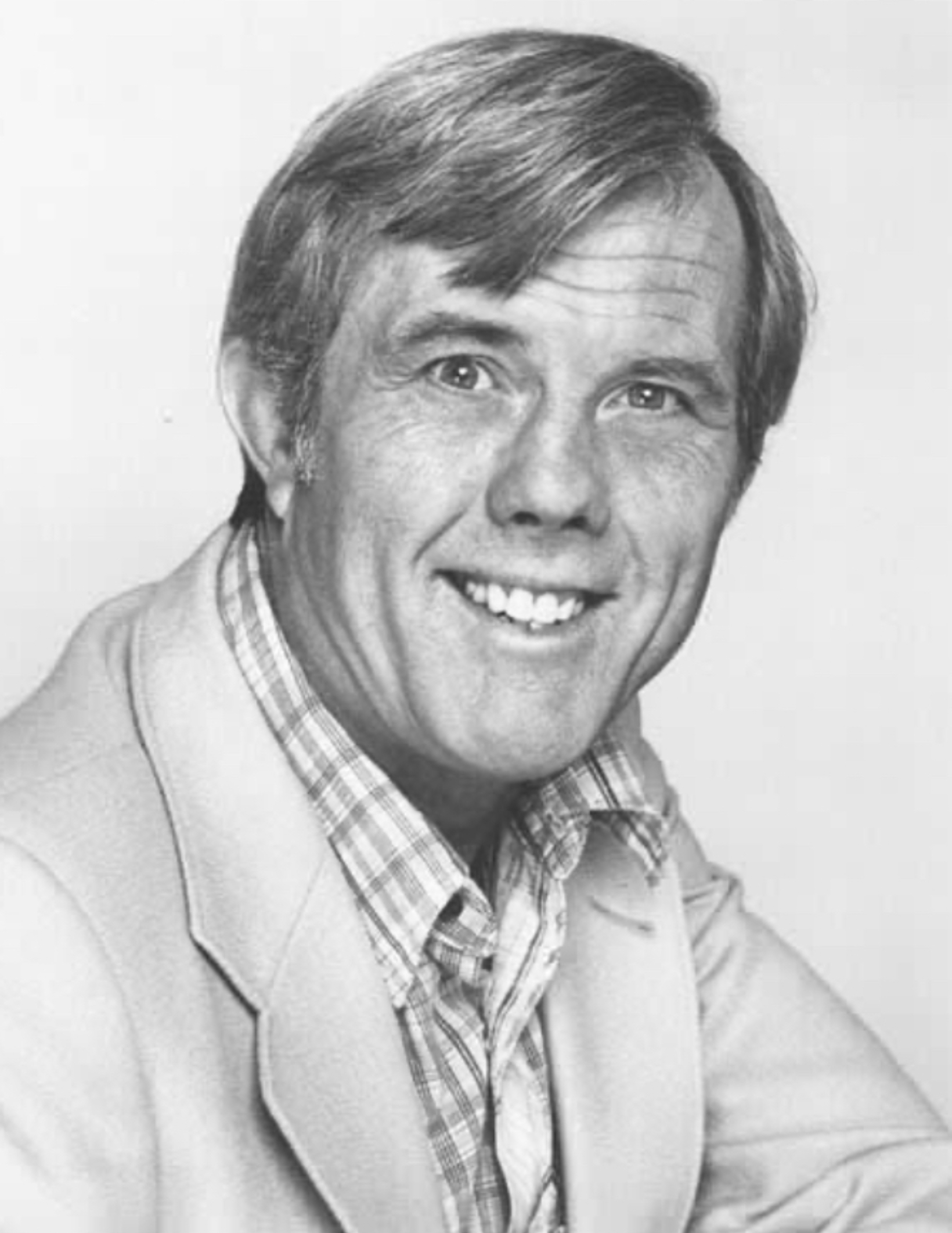
- Fimple in Matt Houston, 1982
- Born: Dennis Clarke Fimple; November 11, 1940; Taft, California, U.S.
- Died: August 23, 2002 (aged 61); Frazier Park, California, U.S.
- Occupation: Actor
- Years active: 1961–2002
- Children: 1

Dennis Clarke Fimple (November 11, 1940 – August 23, 2002) was an American actor.

== Biography ==
Fimple was born in Taft, California, the son of Dolly and Elmer Fimple. He graduated from Taft Union High School in 1958 and received a teaching certificate from San Jose State University, where he majored in Drama.

He appeared in a variety of TV shows including Here Come the Brides, Petticoat Junction, Matt Houston, M*A*S*H, Centennial, Simon & Simon, Highway to Heaven, Sledge Hammer!, Knight Rider, Quantum Leap and ER. He also had roles in films such as Truck Stop Women (1974), The Apple Dumpling Gang (1975), Mackintosh and T.J. (1975), Stay Hungry (1976), King Kong (1976), The Shadow of Chikara (1977), Goin' South (1978), The Wild Women of Chastity Gulch (1982) and Maverick (1994), and shared the lead in Bootleggers (1974) and Creature from Black Lake (1976).

He may be best known for his seven episodes as the lovable but none-too-bright Devil's Hole Gang member, Kyle Murtry, on the ABC comedy/western series, Alias Smith and Jones. In 1993–94, he appeared as Garral in seven episodes of the Beau Bridges/Lloyd Bridges comedy/western series Harts of the West on CBS. His last role was in the 2003 Rob Zombie horror film House of 1000 Corpses, as the foul-mouthed Grandpa Hugo.

Fimple died in his Frazier Park home on August 23, 2002, where he was recovering from injuries sustained in a car accident four days earlier.

== Partial filmography ==
- Summertree (1971) - Shelly
- Cactus in the Snow (1971) - Mr. Murray
- The Culpepper Cattle Co. (1972) - Wounded Man in Bar
- Truck Stop Women (1974) - Curly
- The Spectre of Edgar Allan Poe (1974) - Farron
- Bootleggers (1974) - Dewey Crenshaw
- You and Me (1974)
- The Apple Dumpling Gang (1975) - Rudy Hooks
- Winterhawk (1975) - Scoby
- Mackintosh and T.J. (1975) - Schuster
- White House Madness (1975) - Bob Haldeman
- Creature from Black Lake (1976) - Pahoo
- Stay Hungry (1976) - Bubba
- King Kong (1976) - Sunfish
- The Shadow of Chikara (1977) - Posey
- Goin' South (1978) - Hangman
- Smokey and the Good Time Outlaws (1978) - The Salt Flat Kid
- They Went That-A-Way & That-A-Way (1978) - Lem
- The Evictors (1979) - Mr. Bumford
- Swing Shift (1984) - Rupert George
- A Summer to Remember (1985) - Smitty (animal feeder)
- Body Slam (1986) - Elmo Smithfield
- Hawken's Breed (1987) - Crowley
- The Giant of Thunder Mountain (1991) - Henderson (Townsman)
- My Heroes Have Always Been Cowboys (1991) - Straw Hat
- Death Falls (1991) - Griff
- Maverick (1994) - Stuttering
- Down Periscope (1996) - Fisherman
- Bug Buster (1998) - Judediah
- Escape to Grizzly Mountain (2000) - Farmer
- Fangs (2002) - Willy Kramer
- House of 1000 Corpses (2003) - Grampa Hugo (released posthumously; final film role)
