= Howco =

American film company

Howco Howco International
- Company type: Corporation
- Founded: 1951
- Founder: Joy Newton Houck Sr. J. Francis White
- Headquarters: New Orleans, Louisiana
- Owner: independent

Howco Productions, later Howco International Pictures, was an American film production and distribution company based in South Carolina, specialising in low budget B pictures designed for double features.

In 1951 Joy Newton Houck Sr. (born 10 July 1900, Magnolia, Arkansas died 8 July 1999, Texarkana, Texas), owner of 29 Joy Theatres in Arkansas, Louisiana, and Mississippi, teamed up with producer/director Ron Ormond and J. Francis White, an officer of Consolidated Theatres and owner of 31 cinemas in Virginia, North and South Carolina, to contract with independent film producers to create product for their combined theatre chains. Their initials, "H, O, W," provided the name of the company.

Outlaw Women, started in November 1951, was its first production.

Initially Howco released Westerns from Ron Ormond's company featuring Lash LaRue, then moved into monster, science fiction, and exploitation films. In 1954 Howco expanded its production with four films announced, including Kentucky Rifle. The same year, it started a television distribution company called National Television Films. Howco released Roger Corman's Carnival Rock (paired with Teenage Thunder), Ed Wood's Jail Bait (paired with The Blonde Pickup, a reissue of 1951's Racket Girls), double features such as The Brain from Planet Arous and Teenage Monster (1957), and Lost, Lonely and Vicious and My World Dies Screaming (1958). One unusual exploitation effort was derived from an aborted television series, filmed in Europe and starring radio's hillbilly comedians Lum and Abner. Howco compiled the three half-hour pilot episodes into a feature film, Lum and Abner Abroad (1956), which played to the comedians' fan base in the rural South. Howco exploited the film as "a big dish of corn with a continental flavor."

Houck Sr.'s son Joy N. Houck Jr. directed two of the company's final double bills, Night of Bloody Horror and Women and Bloody Terror (1970). In the 1970s Howco achieved success with Charles B. Pierce's films including The Legend of Boggy Creek, Bootleggers and Winterhawk.

== Bibliography ==
- Craig, Rob (12 September 2009). Ed Wood, Mad Genius: A Critical Study of the Films. McFarland. ISBN 978-0-7864-5423-5.
- Doherty, Thomas Patrick (1988). Teenagers and Teenpics: The Juvenilization of American Movies in the 1950s. Unwin Hyman. ISBN 978-0-04-445139-6.
- Fischer, Dennis (14 December 2011). Science Fiction Film Directors, 1895-1998. McFarland. ISBN 978-0-7864-8505-5.
- Heffernan, Kevin (25 March 2004). Ghouls, Gimmicks, and Gold: Horror Films and the American Movie Business, 1953–1968. Duke University Press. ISBN 978-0-8223-8555-4.
- Lewis, Jack C. (16 October 2002). White Horse, Black Hat: A Quarter Century on Hollywood's Poverty Row. Bloomsbury Publishing PLC. ISBN 978-0-8108-4358-5.
- Monteith, Sharon; Jancovich, Mark; Grainge, Paul (11 January 2007). Film Histories: An Introduction and Reader. Edinburgh University Press. ISBN 978-1-4744-6155-9.
- Schauer, Bradley (3 January 2017). Escape Velocity: American Science Fiction Film, 1950–1982. Wesleyan University Press. ISBN 978-0-8195-7660-6.
- Wagner, Laura (7 April 2025). Hollywood Boozers, Brawlers and Hard-Luck Cases: Fifteen Ill-Fated Actors of the Golden Age. McFarland. ISBN 978-1-4766-5406-5.
- Warren, Bill (12 January 2017). Keep Watching the Skies!: American Science Fiction Movies of the Fifties, The 21st Century Edition. McFarland. ISBN 978-1-4766-2505-8.
