= The Norseman =

1978 American adventure film

- Directed by: Charles B. Pierce
- Written by: Charles B. Pierce
- Produced by: Charles B. Pierce
- Starring: Lee Majors; Cornel Wilde; Mel Ferrer; Jack Elam
- Cinematography: Robert Bethard
- Edited by: Robert Bell; Stephen Dunn; Aladar Klein; Shirak Kojayan; Sarah Legon
- Music by: Jaime Mendoza-Nava
- Production companies: Charles B. Pierce Film Productions; Fawcett-Majors Productions
- Distributed by: American International Pictures
- Release date: October 5, 1978
- Running time: 90 minutes
- Country: United States
- Language: English
- Budget: $3 million
- Box office: $1 million

The Norseman is a 1978 American adventure film starring Lee Majors and directed, produced and written by Charles B. Pierce.

== Plot ==
An 11th-century Viking prince sails to North America to find his father, who was captured by Native Americans during a previous voyage.

== Cast ==
- Lee Majors - Thorvald
- Cornel Wilde - Ragnar
- Mel Ferrer - King Eurich
- Jack Elam - Death Dreamer
- Susie Coelho - Winetta
- Christopher Connelly - Rolf
- Jimmy Clem - Olif
- Deacon Jones - Thrall
- Denny Miller - Rauric
- Kathleen Freeman - Old Indian Woman
- Jesse Pearson - Narrator (voice)

== Production ==
The film was a co-production between Charles Pierce and Lee Majors, with AIP handling the distribution. It was Pierce's first film with a major Hollywood studio.

Majors said it "took a lot of guts" to play a Viking but was persuaded by a fee of $500,000 and 10% of the profits. He later remarked, "I had a little time off, and they said, "It shoots in Florida, on the coast there, out of Tampa," and they had a bunch of Tampa Bay Buccaneers that were gonna play Vikings, so ... I don't know, I thought it'd be fun, so I did it."

The film was shot in Tampa, Florida. Postproduction was done at Pierce's $2 million facility at Shreveport, Louisiana.

"There is no character to develop here and hardly any dialogue," said Majors, "this is a formula film."

== Reception ==
The Los Angeles Times called it "tedious business".
