= Grayeagle =

1977 film by Charles B. Pierce

- Theatrical poster
- Directed by: Charles B. Pierce
- Written by: Brad White; Charles B. Pierce; Michael O. Sajbel
- Produced by: Charles B. Pierce; Tom Clark
- Starring: Ben Johnson
- Cinematography: James W. Roberson
- Edited by: James W. Roberson
- Music by: Jaime Mendoza-Nava
- Production company: Charles B. Pierce Film Productions
- Distributed by: American International Pictures
- Release date: December 28, 1977
- Running time: 104 minutes
- Country: United States
- Language: English
- Box office: $2.5 million

Grayeagle is a 1977 American Western film directed Charles B. Pierce, written by Pierce, Brad White, and Michael O. Sajbel, starring Ben Johnson, Iron Eyes Cody and Lana Wood. The theme is about kidnapping and interracial/cross-cultural romance.

== Plot ==
Set in 1848, in the Montana Territory, Ben Johnson plays John Coulter who lives on the plains with his daughter Beth and his friend Standing Bear. The story is told mainly from a Native American point of view.

Beth is kidnapped by Greyeagle of the Cheyenne nation, who was tasked by the chief to bring Beth to him. Coulter and Standing Bear go through various adventures to find Beth, to bring her back safely home.

== Cast ==
- Ben Johnson as John Coulter
- Iron Eyes Cody as Standing Bear
- Lana Wood as Beth Coulter
- Jack Elam as Trapper Willis
- Paul Fix as Running Wolf
- Alex Cord as Grayeagle
- Jacob Daniels as Scar
- Jimmy Clem as Abe Stroud
- Cindy Butler as Ida Coulter
- Charles B. Pierce as Bugler

== Reception ==
A review in Variety stated that "there are enough jolts of variety, as in the fight sequences and crazed hermit subplot, to hold audience interest," but "Standing Bear, as played by Iron Eyes Cody, is one end of a simplistic and basically racist attitude Pierce holds towards Indians. Standing Bear is the passive 'Injun,' the Warrior Tom figure. Then there are the ragamuffin savages who whoop, paint their faces and misuse their pronouns as in 'Me want 'em wampum.'" Linda Gross of the Los Angeles Times wrote, "Pierce's hammy performance is the nastiest thing in his film, which is flagrantly corny but good-natured, with colorful scenes of duels and tribal rituals." Ray Conlogue of The Globe and Mail commented, "The major casting weakness is Natalie Wood's sister, Lana, who is very wooden in a major role," while Cord as Grayeagle was "agreeable enough. On balance, 'agreeable' is a good word, and a fair one, for the movie. It's one step better than a blood 'n' feathers epic, a movie that hoped to have some integrity while remaining marketable, and has somewhat managed both."
