= Jack Elam =

American actor (1920–2003)

- Elam in 1979
- Born: William Scott Elam; November 13, 1920; Miami, Arizona, US
- Died: October 20, 2003 (aged 82); Ashland, Oregon, US
- Occupation: Actor
- Years active: 1944–1995
- Spouses: Jean L. Hodgert (m. 1937; died 1961) Margaret M. Jennison (m. 1961)
- Children: 3

William Scott "Jack" Elam (November 13, 1920 – October 20, 2003) was an American film and television actor best known for his numerous roles as villains in Western films, and later in his career, comedies (sometimes spoofing his villainous image). His most distinguishing physical quality was his misaligned eye. Before his career in acting, he took several jobs in finance and served two years in the U.S. Navy during World War II. Elam performed in 73 movies and in at least 41 television series.

== Early life ==
Born on November 13, 1920, in Miami, Arizona, a small mining town located 85 miles east of Phoenix, Jack was one of two children of Millard Elam and Alice Amelia, née Kerby. Jack's father supported the family by working assorted jobs over the years, including stints as a carpenter, millman, and accountant. (Note: The spellings of Alice Kerby's first name and maiden name vary in both official and unofficial records. They are spelled "Alyce" and "Kirby" in some records, including on her 1918 marriage documents to Millard Elam and on her 1924 death certificate. The surname of her parents, however, is consistently spelled "Kerby" on the family's grave markers. Refer to "Arizona, County Marriages, 1871–1964", license and certificate of Millard Elam and Alyce A. Kirby, September 28, 1918, Miami, Gila County, Arizona; original marriage documents preserved at Arizona Department of Libraries, Archives, and Public Records, Phoenix. Retrieved via FamilySearch, October 2, 2022.) The Elams by 1924 had moved from Miami to the nearby community of Globe, Arizona, where in September that year Alice died at the age of 40, succumbing to what state medical records cite as a three-year struggle with "general paralysis". After their mother's death, young Jack and his older sister Mildred went to live with various family members until Millard married again in April 1928 to Kansas native Flossie Varney. Federal census records show that two years later, the children, their father, stepmother, and Flossie's own mother were residing together in Globe, where Millard had a new job as an investigator for a loan company. Flossie was employed, as well, at the time as a public-school teacher, while Jack also contributed to the family's income by periodically working on nearby farms gleaning cotton.

=== Eye injury ===
In 1931, Elam suffered a severe injury to his left eye during an altercation with another boy, an injury that ultimately blinded him in that eye and permanently damaged the muscles surrounding it. As Jack grew older, the impaired muscles caused his eye increasingly to "drift" within its socket and not track in unison with his right eye, often giving him a cock-eyed appearance. Percy Shain, a veteran film and television critic for The Boston Globe, interviewed Elam in 1974 and quoted the actor's comments about the injury:

I lost my eye when I was 11 in a fight at—would you believe it?—a boy scout meeting...It was a big initiation night, but I got into a scrap with this other kid and he put a pencil through my eye. There was no doctor there and it wasn't looked at until sometime afterward. They finally took out the lens and made it sightless. It was 20 years, though, before it started drifting. If it became an issue I could have it operated on, but at this stage of life I probably won't.
There was a time, though, when I was making Rawhide, the movie [1951], that I mentioned to Darryl Zanuck [head of 20th Century-Fox] that I could have it fixed. He said, "Don't do it. It's part of your mystique." So I never got back to it and it's become my trademark, in a way. At this stage, it only causes me minor inconvenience. Sometimes I'm a little off center, or when I'm talking to someone I do it at a slight angle.

Zanuck's remarks about Elam's eye proved to be wise career advice, for despite any lifelong disadvantages that his "lazy eye" created for him personally, it proved to be an asset professionally, at least as a performer. His eye's distinctive appearance, combined with Elam's natural acting abilities, drew the attention of many casting directors of films and television series throughout the 1950s and 1960s.

=== Education, military service, and jobs prior to acting ===
Before becoming an actor, Elam completed his high-school education, got married, attended college, worked in a variety of jobs, and despite being blind in one eye, served two years in the U.S. Navy during World War II as a supply officer. He completed his secondary education in Arizona, graduating from Phoenix Union High School in the late 1930s and then moving to California, where he majored in "business studies" at Modesto and Santa Monica junior colleges. (Note: According to Jack Elam's entry in the 1940 federal census, by April that year he had attained the equivalent of "C-1" or one year of college education. See "Sixteenth Census of the United States: 1940 Population Schedule", household of Jack M. Elam and Jean L. Elam, Los Angeles City, Los Angeles County, California, April 29, 1940; digitized image of original census page, Enumeration District 14, 60–1131; NARA. Retrieved via FamilySearch, December 30, 2022.) During that time, he was also employed in several positions before entering military service, including work as a salesman for a "house trailer agency", as an accountant for the Standard Oil Company, a bookkeeper at the Bank of America, and a manager at the Hotel Bel-Air in Los Angeles.

For a few years after his discharge from the Navy, Elam continued to apply his business training as an accountant for Hopalong Cassidy Productions and as an independent auditor for Samuel Goldwyn and other moguls and companies associated with the film industry. That work required Jack to spend long hours each day reading and examining in detail large quantities of financial records, a routine that put too much strain on his right eye, his "good eye". "'I only see out of one eye'", he explained in an interview published in The Baltimore Sun in 1974, "'and that eye kept going shut.'" While Elam was widely recognized in Hollywood as "a leading independent auditor in motion pictures", by 1947, he found it necessary to quit that successful occupation entirely. He added, "'I had [my right eye] operated on several times and finally the doctor said he couldn't open it any more. He told me I had to get out of the business immediately or go blind.'"

== Acting career ==
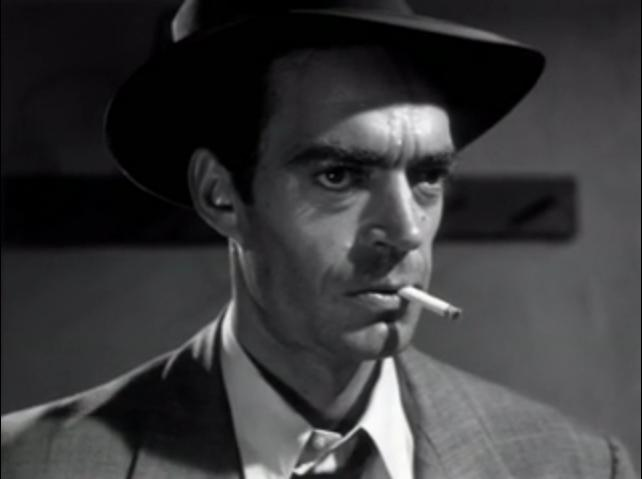
Elam in Kansas City Confidential (1952)

Elam made his screen debut in 1949 in She Shoulda Said No!, an exploitation film in which a chorus girl's habitual marijuana smoking ruins her career and then drives her brother to suicide. Over the next decade as an actor, Elam continued to perform most often in gangster films and Westerns, firmly establishing himself in those genres as a reliable and memorable villain or "heavy". In fact by the end of the 1950s, various American news outlets and moviegoers were referring to him as "the screen's most loathsome character".

On television in the 1950s and 1960s, he made multiple guest-star appearances on many popular Western series, including The Lone Ranger, Gunsmoke, The Rifleman, Lawman, Bonanza, Cheyenne, Have Gun – Will Travel, Zorro, The Rebel, F Troop, Tales of Wells Fargo, The Texan, and Rawhide. In 1961, he played a slightly crazed bus passenger on The Twilight Zone episode "Will the Real Martian Please Stand Up?". That same year, he also portrayed the Mexican historical figure Juan Cortina in "The General Without a Cause", an episode of the anthology series Death Valley Days. In 1962, Elam appeared as Paul Henry on Lawman in the episode titled "Clootey Hutter".

Elam was the antagonist of the 1960 film The Girl in Lovers Lane, which was subsequently the subject of a season-five episode of Mystery Science Theater 3000.

In 1963, Elam portrayed a heroic character, appearing as the reformed gunfighter Deputy US Marshal J. D. Smith in the ABC/Warner Bros. series The Dakotas, a Western intended as the successor of Cheyenne. The Dakotas ran for 19 episodes. He was then cast as George Taggart, "a former gunfighter who has become a U.S. marshal", in the 1963–1964 NBC/WB series Temple Houston.

In 1966, Jack Elam was cast in his first comedic role by Paramount Pictures, playing Hank in the Western film The Night of the Grizzly starring Clint Walker. The next year, for the Harold Hecht production The Way West, he was chosen for another light-hearted role, playing Preacher Weatherby and providing support to costars Robert Mitchum, Richard Widmark, and Kirk Douglas in a story about a wagon train traveling the Oregon Trail. Then in 1968, Elam performed in the opening scenes of Sergio Leone's celebrated "spaghetti Western" Once Upon a Time in the West. In that film, he portrays one of a trio of gunslingers sent to a train station to kill Charles Bronson's character. Elam, in one sequence, spends a good portion of his screen time simply trying to rid himself of an annoying fly, finally capturing the elusive insect inside the barrel of his pistol.

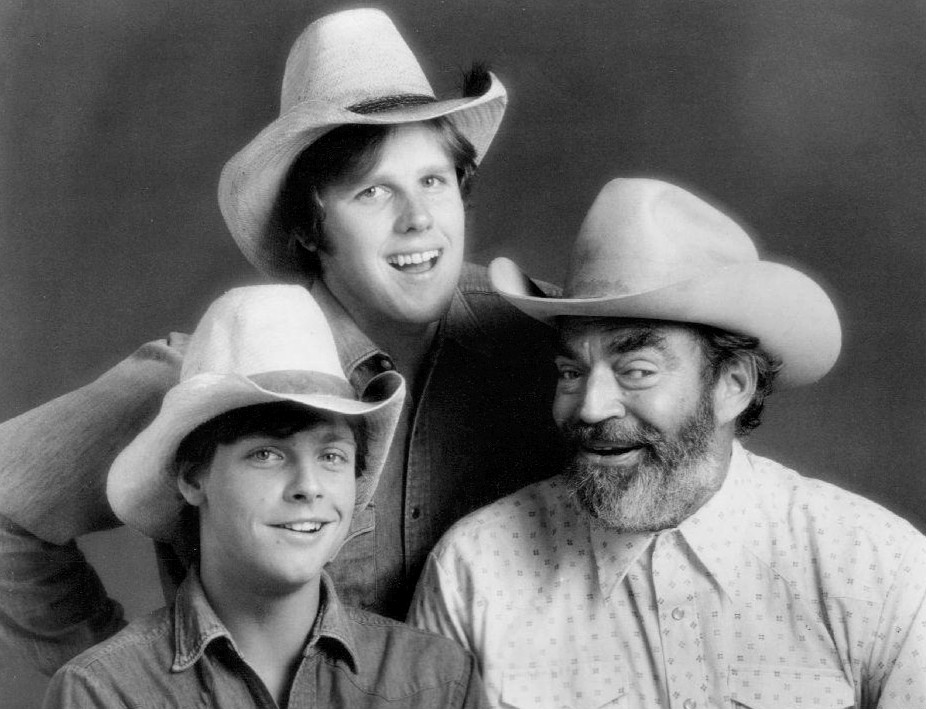
Gary Busey (standing), Mark Hamill (left) and Elam in The Texas Wheelers (1974)

In 1969, he played another comedic role in Support Your Local Sheriff!, which was followed two years later by Support Your Local Gunfighter, both opposite James Garner. After his performances in those two films, Elam found his villainous parts dwindling and his comic roles increasing. (Both films were also directed by Burt Kennedy, who had seen Elam's potential as a comedian and directed him a total of 15 times in features and television.) Between those two films, he also played a comically cranky old coot opposite John Wayne in Howard Hawks's Rio Lobo (1970). In 1974–1975, he was cast as Zack Wheeler in The Texas Wheelers, a short-lived comedy series in which he portrayed a long-lost father returning home to raise his four children after their mother dies. Also on television, in 1979, he performed as Frankenstein's monster on the CBS sitcom Struck by Lightning, but the show was canceled after only three of eleven episodes produced were aired (the remaining eight episodes remain unaired in the US while all episodes were aired in the UK the following year). He then appeared in the role of Hick Peterson in a first-season episode of Home Improvement alongside Ernest Borgnine (season one, episode 20, "Birds of a Feather Flock to Taylor").

Elam portrayed Doctor Nikolas Van Helsing, a "crazed proctologist", in the 1981 action-comedy film The Cannonball Run, and three years later, he reprised the role for the production's sequel, Cannonball Run II. Elam then played the character Charlie Hankins, a town drunk, in the 1986 "Weird Western" picture The Aurora Encounter. During production, Elam developed what would become a lifelong relationship with an 11-year-old boy in Texas named Mickey Hays, who suffered from progeria. The 1987 documentary I Am Not a Freak portrays the close friendship between Elam and Hays. Elam, in what may be an apocryphal quote, said, "You know I've met a lot of people, but I've never met anybody that got next to me like Mickey."

In 1986, Elam also co-starred on the short-lived comedy series Easy Street as Alvin "Bully" Stevenson, the down-on-his-luck uncle of Loni Anderson's character, L. K. McGuire. In 1988, Elam co-starred with Willie Nelson in the made-for-television movie Where the Hell's that Gold?

In 1994, Elam was inducted into the Hall of Great Western Performers of the National Cowboy and Western Heritage Museum in Oklahoma City, Oklahoma.

== Personal life and death ==
Elam was married twice, first to Jean Louise Hodgert from 1937 until her death from colon cancer on January 24, 1961. (Note: Although California marriage records document that Jack Millard Elam and Jean Louise Hodgert married in Los Angeles on April 20, 1944, the US Census of 1940 documents that the couple that year were already living together in the city as husband and wife. See the 1940 census reference previously cited herein as well as the "California, County Marriages, 1850–1952" database, which includes a microfilm copy of a 1944 marriage certificate of Jack Millard Elam and Jean Louise Hodgert.) Seven months later, in August 1961, Elam married again, to Margaret M. Jennison. The couple remained together for 42 years, until October 20, 2003, when Jack died of congestive heart failure at their home in Ashland, Oregon.

Elam was a practicing Episcopalian who cited how his faith helped guide him every step of the way between his difficult childhood as well as giving him the strength to overcome the lean times at the start of his career likewise establish the career he had in film and television. During his time of residence in California, he attended All Saints-by-the-Sea Episcopal Church in Santa Barbara, California, and Trinity Episcopal Church following his relocation to Ashland, Oregon.

In his own words regarding his faith:

"Hollywood is a town built on smoke and mirrors, where I spent days playing killers, outlaws, and dynamic characters under the hot lights. It’s easy to get lost in a business that chaotic, but for me, my faith in the Episcopal Church was the quiet anchor that kept my feet planted firmly on the ground. The liturgy, the tradition, and the grace I found in that church weren’t just something I looked to on Sundays—they were the very foundation of who I was when the cameras stopped rolling. My faith helped me dramatically in every role I ever played, as it helped me with life in general too. When I served my country in the Navy during World War II, it was that same inner spiritual strength that guided me through the uncertainty of war and brought me safely back home. It gave me the patience and steady heart to be a devoted husband and a present father to my children, ensuring my family always had a rock to lean on. And as an actor, it gave me the discipline to survive the dry spells and the deep empathy to find the human soul in even the most broken, villainous characters I portrayed. At the end of the day, all the fame and applause don't amount to much if you aren't doing some good with the time you're given; if I can bless the life of another and make that person smile, then I know I’ve done what God put me on this earth to do. I looked at a wild world, but my faith always pointed me back to what was real, what was decent, and what mattered most."

A staunch conservative Republican, he was active in the political landscape of the film industry as a member of both the Hollywood Republican Committee and the Motion Picture Alliance for the Preservation of American Ideals. He remained aligned with the party through the California State Republican Committee, Jackson County Republican Party, and the Oregon Republican Party. Throughout his life, Elam supported the presidential campaigns and administrations of Dwight D. Eisenhower, Barry Goldwater, Richard Nixon, Gerald Ford, Ronald Reagan, George H. W. Bush, Bob Dole, and George W. Bush.

Respectively speaking of his political beliefs:

“People talk about the American Dream like it’s some abstract idea written down in a book, but to me, it’s purely about what a man does with his own two hands. I've been a staunch conservative Republican my whole life because I believed in self-reliance, hard work, and the freedom to build your own destiny. Look at my life: I grew up with a rough, complicated childhood out in the Southwest, lost the sight in my left eye when I was just a kid, worked as an accountant, served my country in the Navy, and spent years starving in the lean times before Hollywood ever gave me a dime. Nobody handed me a career; I had to go out there, survive the grit, and pull myself up. You figure, if I could go through the hardest times imaginable, look adversity right in the face, and triumph on my own steam, then any individual in this great country of ours can do the exact same thing! The government shouldn't carry a man—it should just get out of the way and let his own grit prove what he's worth.”

Following his retirement in 1995, Elam settled into a quiet lifestyle in the Pacific Northwest, living in a secluded wooden home tucked behind a line of trees on the edge of Ashland, Oregon, where he moved in 1987. In stark contrast to the fierce, villainous persona he typically portrayed on screen, local accounts described him as an incredibly warm, humorous, kind-hearted, and generous family man. During this period, he remained active within the community and frequently dedicated his time to conservative grassroots projects and various charitable causes. Away from the spotlight, he spent much of his time enjoying simple outdoor activities, particularly playing golf and fishing along the local rivers. He also frequently hosted close friends at his Ashland residence, where he enjoyed brewing coffee and sharing humorous, behind-the-scenes reminiscences from his five decades in classic Hollywood cinema.

== Filmography ==
=== Film ===
List of performances in films
Title	Year	Roles	Notes
Mystery Range	1947	Burvel Lambert	
She Shoulda Said No!	1949	Raymond – Henchman	
The Sundowners	1950	Earl Boyce	
Key to the City	1950	Councilman	Uncredited
Quicksand	1950	Man at Bar	Uncredited
One Way Street	1950	Arnie	Uncredited
A Ticket to Tomahawk	1950	Fargo	Uncredited
Love That Brute	1950	Henchman No. 2 in Cigar Store	Uncredited
High Lonesome	1950	Smiling Man	
American Guerrilla in the Philippines	1951	The Speaker	
The Texan Meets Calamity Jane	1951	Henchman	Uncredited
Bird of Paradise	1951	The Trader	
Rawhide	1951	Tevis	
The Bushwackers	1951	Cree	
Finders Keepers	1952	Eddie	
Rancho Notorious	1952	Mort Geary	
The Battle at Apache Pass	1952	Mescal Jack	
High Noon	1952	Charlie – Drunk in Jail	Uncredited
Montana Territory	1952	Gimp	
Lure of the Wilderness	1952	Dave Longden	
My Man and I	1952	Celestino Garcia	
The Ring	1952	Harry Jackson	
Kansas City Confidential	1952	Pete Harris	
Count the Hours	1953	Max Verne	
Ride, Vaquero!	1953	Barton	
Gun Belt	1953	Rusty Kolloway	
The Moonlighter	1953	Slim	
Appointment in Honduras	1953	Castro	
Jubilee Trail	1954	Whitey	
Ride Clear of Diablo	1954	Tim Lowerie	
Princess of the Nile	1954	Basra	
The Far Country	1954	Frank Newberry	
Cattle Queen of Montana	1954	Yost	
Vera Cruz	1954	Tex	
Tarzan's Hidden Jungle	1955	Burger	
The Man from Laramie	1955	Chris Boldt	
Man Without a Star	1955	Knife Murderer	Uncredited
Kiss Me Deadly	1955	Charlie Max	
Moonfleet	1955	Damen	
Wichita	1955	Al	
Artists and Models	1955	Ivan	
Kismet	1955	Hasan-Ben	
Jubal	1956	McCoy – Bar 8 Rider	
Pardners	1956	Pete	
Thunder Over Arizona	1956	Deputy Slats Callahan	
Dragoon Wells Massacre	1957	Tioga	
Gunfight at the O.K. Corral	1957	Tom McLowery	
Lure of the Swamp	1957	Henry Bliss	
Night Passage	1957	Shotgun	
Baby Face Nelson	1957	Fatso Nagel	
The Gun Runners	1958	Arnold	
Edge of Eternity	1959	Bill Ward	
The Girl in Lovers Lane	1960	Jesse	
The Last Sunset	1961	Ed Hobbs	
The Comancheros	1961	Horseface (Comanchero)	
Pocketful of Miracles	1961	Cheesecake	
4 for Texas	1963	Dobie	
The Rare Breed	1966	Simons	
The Night of the Grizzly	1966	Hank	
The Way West	1967	Preacher Weatherby	
The Last Challenge	1967	Ernest Scarnes	
Firecreek	1968	Norman	
Never a Dull Moment	1968	Ace Williams	
Sartana Does Not Forgive	1968	Slim Kovacs	
Once Upon a Time in the West	1968	Snaky – Member of Frank's Gang	
Support Your Local Sheriff!	1969	Jake	
The Cockeyed Cowboys of Calico County	1970	Kittrick	
Dirty Dingus Magee	1970	John Wesley Hardin	
The Wild Country	1970	Thompson	
Rio Lobo	1970	Mr Phillips	
Support Your Local Gunfighter	1971	Jug May	
The Last Rebel	1971	Matt	
Hannie Caulder	1971	Frank Clemens	
Pat Garrett and Billy the Kid	1973	Alamosa Bill	
Knife for the Ladies	1974	Jarrod (Sheriff)	
Creature from Black Lake	1976	Joe Canton	
Hawmps!	1976	Bad Jack Cutter	
The Winds of Autumn	1976	J. Pete Hankins	
Pony Express Rider	1976	Crazy Charlie	
Grayeagle	1977	Trapper Willis	
Hot Lead and Cold Feet	1978	Rattlesnake	
The Norseman	1978	Death Dreamer	
The Apple Dumpling Gang Rides Again	1979	Big Mac	
The Sacketts	1979	Ira Bigelow	
The Villain	1979	Avery Simpson	
The Cannonball Run	1981	Doctor Nikolas Van Helsing	
Soggy Bottom, U.S.A.	1981	Troscliar Boudreaux	
Jinxed!	1982	Otto	
Sacred Ground	1983	Lum Witcher	
Lost	1983	Mr. Newsome	
Cannonball Run II	1984	Doctor Nikolas Van Helsing	
The Aurora Encounter	1986	Charlie Hankins	
Hawken's Breed	1988	Tackett	
Once Upon a Texas Train	1988	Jason Fitch	
Big Bad John	1990	Jake Calhoun	
The Giant of Thunder Mountain	1991	Hezekiah Crow	
Suburban Commando	1991	Col. Dustin 'Dusty' McHowell	
Shadow Force	1992	Tommy	
Uninvited	1993	Grady	

=== Television ===
List of performances in television
Title	Year	Role	Episode
Tales of Wells Fargo	1957	Chris	"The Hijackers" - S1.E11
The Restless Gun	1957	Link Jared	"Trail to Sunset"
Lawman	1958	Flynn Hawks	"The Deputy"
The Restless Gun	1958	Tony Molenauer	"Hornitas Town"
Have Gun – Will Travel	1958	Joe Gage	"The Man Who Lost" (Written by Ida Lupino)
The Texan	1958	Tug Swann	"The Eastener"
The Rifleman	1958	Sim Groder	"Duel of Honor"
Gunsmoke	1959	Dolph Quince	"Jayhawkers"
Gunsmoke	1959	Steed	"Saludos"
The Texan	1959	Luke Watson	"South of the Border"
The Texan	1959	Dud Parsons	"Lady Tenderfoot"
The Rifleman	1959	Gavin Martin	"Tension"
Tombstone Territory	1959	Wally Jobe	"Day of the Amnesty"
Gunsmoke	1960	Clint Dodie	"Where'd They Go"
Sugarfoot	1961	Toothy Thompson	"Toothy Thompson"
Sugarfoot	1961	Toothy Thompson	"Angel"
The Twilight Zone	1961	Crazy Man	"Will the Real Martian Please Stand Up?"
Bonanza	1961	Dodie Hoad	"The Spitfire"
Cheyenne	1961	Count Nicholas Potosi	"Massacre at Gunsight Pass"
Gunsmoke	1961	Ben	"Love Thy Neighbor"
The Untouchables	1962	Jug Alverson	"Pressure"
Cheyenne	1962	Deputy J. D. Smith	"A Man Called Ragan"
Cheyenne	1962	Calhoun Durango	"The Durango Brothers"
Have Gun – Will Travel	1962	Arnold Shaffner	"One, Two, Three"
Gunsmoke	1964	Hector	"Homecoming"
Gunsmoke	1964	Specter	"Help Me, Kitty"
Daniel Boone	1965	Petch	S1/E18 - "The Sound of Fear"
Gunsmoke	1965	Sam Band	"Clayton Thaddeus Greenwood"
Gunsmoke	1965	Del Ormand	"Malachi"
F-Troop	1965	Sam Urp	"Dirge for the Scourge"
Gunsmoke	1966	Jim Barrett	"My Father, My Son"
Bonanza	1967	Buford Buckalew	"A Bride for Buford"
The Wild Wild West	1967	Zack Slade	"The Night of Montezuma's Hordes"
Gunsmoke	1968	William Prange	"The First People"
The High Chaparral	1968	Macklin	"North To Tucson"
Gunsmoke	1969	Pack Landers	The Sisters
Ride a Northbound Horse	1969	The Sheriff	Walt Disney's Wonderful World of Color
Bonanza	1970	Honest John	"Honest John"
The Virginian	1970	Harve Yost	"Rich Man, Poor Man"
Gunsmoke	1971	Lucas Murdoch	"Murdoch"
Gunsmoke	1971	Titus Spangler	"P.S. Murry Christmas"
Gunsmoke	1972	Pierre Audubon	"The River – Parts 1 & 2"
The Daughters of Joshua Cabe	1972	Bitterroot	ABC Movie of the Week
The Texas Wheelers	1974–1975	Zack Wheeler	Main role; 8 episodes
Phyllis	1975–1976	Van Horn	A lovable wino, 3 episodes
How the West Was Won	1976	Cully Madigan	2 episodes
Eight is Enough	1978, 1980	Joe Simons	2 episodes
Sweepstakes	1979	Frank	Episode: "Billy, Wally and Ludmilla, and Theodore"
Easy Street	1986	Alvin "Bully" Stevenson	22 episodes
Home Improvement	1992	Hick Peterson	"Birds of a Feather Flock to Taylor"
Bonanza: The Return	1993	Buckshot	Television movie
Bonanza: Under Attack	1995	Buckshot	Television movie

== Awards and recognition ==
- 1983: The 1st Annual Golden Boot Awards
- 1994: National Cowboy Hall of Fame, at the Western Heritage Center.
