= List of Major Dad episodes =

This is a list of episodes for the television series Major Dad.

== Series overview ==
Season	Episodes	Originally released		Rank	Rating
Season	Episodes	First released	Last released	Rank	Rating
1	26	September 17, 1989	May 21, 1990	39	13.2
2	24	September 17, 1990	May 13, 1991	21	14.9 (Tied with In the Heat of the Night)
3	24	September 16, 1991	May 11, 1992	9	16.8
4	22	September 25, 1992	May 17, 1993	69	9.8

== Episodes ==
=== Season 1 (1989–90) ===
No. overall	No. in season	Title	Directed by	Written by	Original release date	Viewers (millions)
1	1	"Major Dad"	Will Mackenzie	Richard C. Okie, Earl Pomerantz	September 17, 1989	23.5
Polly writes a distressing article on the Marines and Major John D. MacGillis sets out to prove her wrong, and soon the (romantic) sparks fly.
2	2	"Just Polly & Me, and the Kids Make Five"	Will Mackenzie	Richard C. Okie, Earl Pomerantz	September 18, 1989	22.5
The Major proposes, but Polly's daughters must approve of him and they aren't too keen about it.
3	3	"Rescue Mission"	Will Mackenzie	Janet Leahy	September 25, 1989	22.1
Buzz, an old pal (Dann Florek), tries to persuade the Major to not marry Polly.
4	4	"Wedding"	Will Mackenzie	Richard C. Okie, Earl Pomerantz	October 2, 1989	22.2
An alert on the base interrupts the Major and Polly's wedding day.
5	5	"Wounded Flyboy and the Nurse Who Gave Him Reason to Live"	Linda Day	Lisa Albert	October 9, 1989	20.6
The Major and Polly have trouble finding time together because of their busy schedules.
6	6	"Twinkle"	Linda Day	Jeffrey Stepakoff	October 16, 1989	19.3
Polly asks the Major to straighten things out when Elizabeth falls for Lt. Holowachuk.
7	7	"Jane Wayne Day"	Linda Day	Miriam Trogdon	October 23, 1989	20.3
Polly endures a survival-training day for Marine wives.
8	8	"Robin's Awakening"	Ellen Gittelsohn	Richard C. Okie, Earl Pomerantz	November 6, 1989	19.0
A long-distance chess match comes to town for the final battle and it turns out that a young teen sparks an interest in boys for Robin.
9	9	"Major Mom"	Ellen Gittelsohn	Richard C. Okie, Peter Tilden	November 13, 1989	18.5
Polly goes to jail to protect a news source.
10	10	"Love Doctor"	Ellen Gittelsohn	Richard C. Okie, Peter Tilden	November 20, 1989	17.6
While trying to decide his future plans, Sgt. James makes a decision that ends up hurting Elizabeth. When he hears of the consequences, he makes a better choice.
11	11	"See the Hill... Over the Hill"	Ellen Gittelsohn	Richard C. Okie, Earl Pomerantz	November 27, 1989	19.1
The Major worries he may be over the hill and challenges a reluctant Holowachuk to a martial arts rematch.
12	12	"Boxer Rebellion"	Ellen Gittelsohn	Miriam Trogdon	December 4, 1989	17.5
The Major and Polly disagree about the dress code at Elizabeth's school. The Major says change the school board, and Polly says change the rules and she helps Elizabeth protest.
13	13	"Discipline"	Ellen Gittelsohn	Jeffrey Stepakoff	December 11, 1989	17.5
The Major and Polly think of how to punish Casey for losing one of The Major's medals.
14	14	"Lemon"	Ellen Gittelsohn	Deborah R. Baron	January 1, 1990	24.6
Clashing lifestyles send the family to a counselor after the Major dumps the girls' dead pet bird.
15	15	"That Connell Woman"	Ellen Gittelsohn	Lisa Albert	January 8, 1990	21.3
An old girlfriend and Lt. Colonel (Randee Heller) has romantic designs on the Major.
16	16	"Jr."	Michael Lembeck	Earl Pomerantz	January 29, 1990	20.0
Polly has morning sickness and gives the Major hopes of fatherhood.
17	17	"Major Coach"	Michael Lembeck	Richard C. Okie	February 5, 1990	19.2
Hard feelings arise after Polly asks the Major to coach Robin's basketball team. Lt. Holowachuk buys an expensive camera from a beautiful woman and the Major suspects she is a con artist.
18	18	"Camp MacGillis"	Ellen Gittelsohn	Janet Leahy	February 19, 1990	19.0
The Major takes the family on a camping trip.
19	19	"Not with My Daughter You Don't"	Ellen Gittelsohn	T : Peter Tilden; S/T : Jeffrey Stepakoff	February 26, 1990	19.8
The Major becomes an overprotective father when Elizabeth's new boyfriend Chip becomes more serious.
20	20	"Officer of the Day"	Ellen Gittelsohn	Lisa Albert	March 12, 1990	17.9
Lt. Holowachuk gets in trouble when he plans a secret country hoe-down birthday party for the Major.
21	21	"All Quiet on the Home Front: Part 1"	Ellen Gittelsohn	Rick Hawkins	April 2, 1990	15.8
The Major is put on alert for a top-secret mission. (The crisis in the fictional country of "Costa Negra" closely mirrors the U.S. Invasion of Panama, Operation Just Cause, which had successfully concluded in January 1990 only three months before this two-part episode aired.)
22	22	"All Quiet on the Home Front: Part 2"	Ellen Gittelsohn	Janet Leahy	April 9, 1990	18.1
The Major's family welcomes him back, but he thinks they resent his job. (The battle in which Maj. MacGillis and Lt. Holowachuk participate in "Costa Negra" closely mirrors Operation Just Cause in Panama, which had successfully concluded in January 1990 only three months before this two-part episode aired.)
23	23	"See the Bridge"	Michael Lembeck	Peter Tilden	April 30, 1990	16.9
After returning safely from combat, Lt. Holowachuk craves danger.
24	24	"Standing Tall"	Michael Lembeck	Earl Pomerantz	May 7, 1990	16.4
Casey takes the Major's advice on how to handle a bully.
25	25	"Face the Music... and Dance: Part 1"	Michael Lembeck	Jeffrey Stepakoff	May 14, 1990	19.7
The Major takes a job offer to be transferred to Camp Hollister in Virginia.
26	26	"Face the Music... and Dance: Part 2"	Michael Lembeck	Lisa Albert	May 21, 1990	21.5
The Major decides to quit the Corps.

=== Season 2 (1990–91) ===
No. overall	No. in season	Title	Directed by	Written by	Original release date	Prod. code	Viewers (millions)
27	1	"Safe at First Base"	Michael Lembeck	Rick Hawkins & Earl Pomerantz	September 17, 1990	66501	25.7
The Major adjusts to his new post at Camp Hollister, where the General's grandson takes pictures of Polly.
28	2	"Welcome to Hollister"	Michael Lembeck	Jim Evering	September 24, 1990	66502	24.3
The camp prepares for the Vice President's airplane refueling stop, of which General Craig puts the Major in charge.
29	3	"Get a Job"	Michael Lembeck	Barry Gold	October 1, 1990	66503	21.1
Polly gets a job at a newspaper on the base, "The Bulldog," writing the human interest stories.
30	4	"The Goat"	Michael Lembeck	Earl Pomerantz	October 8, 1990	66504	20.8
A news story mistakenly blames her baseball team's playoff loss on Robin.
31	5	"First Anniversary"	Michael Lembeck	Carrie Honigblum & Renee Phillips	October 15, 1990	66505	20.7
Gunny baby-sits on the Major and Polly's first anniversary.
32	6	"Wetting Down"	Michael Lembeck	Miriam Trogdon	October 22, 1990	66507	23.4
2nd Lt. Howlachuk gets promoted. To everyone's surprise, he says he does not want booze at his wetting-down. The Major wonders why Howlachuk is being uptight about a long drinking tradition, but when Howlachuk reveals he baled a cat while driving the tractor drunk, the Major agrees to a good solution.
33	7	"Infant-ry"	Michael Lembeck	Peter Garcia & Rick Parks	October 29, 1990	66511	24.4
Casey goes overboard to get the Major's attention and becomes a mini-Marine.
34	8	"Birthday Ball"	Michael Lembeck	Rick Hawkins	November 5, 1990	66508	23.5
The major needs a guest of honor for a base celebration of the Corps' 215th anniversary, and Vice President Dan Quayle (appearing as himself) responds to the invitation. However, November 10th is also Elizabeth's 16th birthday, and she feels neglected.
35	9	"Wish You Were Here"	Michael Lembeck	Barry Gold	November 12, 1990	66509	23.1
The Major tries to be spontaneous by taking the family on a last-minute trip to Hawaii.
36	10	"Love on the Run"	Michael Lembeck	Janet Leahy	November 19, 1990	66512	22.6
Lt. Holowachuk gets a Dear John letter, so Polly and Mac fix him up with another girl, but things move faster than anyone expected.
37	11	"Operation Fun Run"	Michael Lembeck	Jim Evering	November 26, 1990	66510	25.7
A hospital visit prevents the Major from completing a Navy Relief fund-raising project, so Gunny and Lt. Holowachuk must see it through.
38	12	"Gift of the Major"	Michael Lembeck	Rick Hawkins	December 17, 1990	66514	20.0
Mac tries to encourage Casey's belief in Santa, which is no small task as she asked for a hard-to-find toy. By chance the Major obtains it, but it gets mistaken as a donation to Toys for Tots. Casey's faith in Santa comes through in a way not even Polly or the Major can understand.
39	13	"Flying Solo"	Michael Lembeck	Leslie Rieder	January 7, 1991	66515	24.8
Polly and the kids find the Major in a suspicious situation — and in need of some quick explaining.
40	14	"A Bird in the Hand"	Michael Lembeck	Carrie Honigblum & Renee Phillips	January 14, 1991	66513	21.3
The Major wants Gunny to express her anger after he accidentally destroys her favorite possession, a ceramic eagle once owned by the Corps' most decorated Marine.
41	15	"Learning to Drive"	Michael Lembeck	Lisa Albert	January 21, 1991	66517	25.0
When Polly backs out of giving Elizabeth driving lessons, the Major steps in. Right after getting her license, Elizabeth hits the General's antique MG.
42	16	"The Name is Over Here"	Michael Lembeck	Rick Hawkins	February 4, 1991	66521	23.1
The Major and his family react to the start of the Persian Gulf War by settling a territorial dispute at home.
43	17	"Valentine's Day"	Michael Lembeck	Jim Evering	February 11, 1991	66520	23.6
The Major is embarrassed by Polly's valentine tribute to him in the base newspaper when it reveals his romantic side in the article; Elizabeth finally agrees to a date with Jesse.
44	18	"Sins of the Father"	Michael Lembeck	Barry Gold	February 18, 1991	66518	25.3
When cleaning the garage a Zorro watch is found, Mac tells the girls that he was a little boy he wanted that watch but could not afford it, so he stole it. The Major asks Polly what could be done to atone for it and show the girls that shoplifting is wrong.
45	19	"The Possible Dream"	Michael Lembeck	Mary Basanese	February 25, 1991	66516	24.0
The officers organize a Marine talent show; the general, whom no one thinks has talent, wants to perform and has to sing at the last minute. Robin runs for president of her student council.
46	20	"Private Affair"	Michael Lembeck	Carrie Honigblum & Renee Phillips	March 11, 1991	66522	21.8
Elizabeth's new beau is a practical-joking Marine the Major doesn't like.
47	21	"Polly's Choice"	Michael Lembeck	Miriam Trogdon	March 18, 1991	66519	24.7
Mac is worried when Polly is asked to collaborate on a photography book with her former wild and woolly boyfriend, Evan Charters (Jameson Parker).
48	22	"Silent Drill Team"	Michael Lembeck	Barry Gold	April 8, 1991	66523	21.2
All the Major dreams of is performing with the Silent Drill Platoon (appearing as themselves), but he is so out of practice his audition may be a nightmare for all involved.
49	23	"Elmo Come Home"	Michael Lembeck	Jim Evering	April 29, 1991	66524	21.3
Gunny reluctantly dog-sits a homeless puppy the Major hopes to adopt for Casey but becomes attached to it.
50	24	"Together"	Michael Lembeck	Rick Hawkins	May 13, 1991	66525	19.7
The Major is charged with writing a speech welcoming troops home from Saudi Arabia. He also decides he wants to adopt Polly's kids, but Elizabeth is reluctant.

=== Season 3 (1991–92) ===
No. overall	No. in season	Title	Directed by	Written by	Original release date	Viewers (millions)
51	1	"The Shut Down"	Michael Lembeck	Rick Hawkins	September 16, 1991	28.0
The Major is none too pleased when a report is received that the Defense Department wants to shut down Camp Hollister.
52	2	"Major Moonlighting"	Michael Lembeck	Jim Evering	September 23, 1991	26.8
To earn some extra cash, The Major gets a job at a service station owned by the Howlachuck family. His new boss: Lt. Howlachuck.
53	3	"Polly's Pen Pal"	Michael Lembeck	Neil Lebowitz	September 30, 1991	25.1
When a sailor whom Robin has been writing to as part of a military pen pal program comes seeking a serious relationship, Polly and the Major try to get to the bottom of it. Apparently, Robin has been lovesick and writing romantic letters to the Navy man, whilst including a picture of Polly as herself.
54	4	"A Few Good Men"	Michael Lembeck	Lisa Albert	October 7, 1991	26.5
The Major is chosen to represent Camp Hollister on a calendar depicting ideal servicemen.
55	5	"Poker Night"	Michael Lembeck	Renee Phillips, Carrie Honigblum	October 14, 1991	25.6
General Craig orders his staff to have a night of fun to boost sagging morale, so the gang decides to play poker, with unexpected results.
56	6	"Anything You Can Do I Can Do Perky"	Michael Lembeck	Ron Lux	October 21, 1991	22.7
A perky but secretly self-serving sergeant (Lorna Patterson) is superb as the new secretarial assistant. So good, in fact, that she upstages Gunny who is not pleased.
57	7	"Educating Casey"	Michael Lembeck	Barry Gold	October 28, 1991	23.6
The Major and Polly succumb to the pressure when Casey is chosen to apply for an accelerated school, which means interviews and tests.
58	8	"Lady in Waiting"	Michael Lembeck	Barry Gold	November 4, 1991	25.9
When Elizabeth is hired as a waitress, Polly and the Major object to her provocative uniform (short, fluffy black dress, white apron and pig ears) which leads Elizabeth to organize a revolt at work.
59	9	"General Unrest"	Michael Lembeck	Manny Basanese	November 11, 1991	24.4
The General decides to move in with the MacGillises when his wife throws him out.
60	10	"Steel Magnolia"	Michael Lembeck	Miriam Trogdon	November 18, 1991	26.1
The Major tangles with activist Pookie Pond (Vicki Lawrence) over potential layoffs. When Polly meets her, however, she finds her to be a peach.
61	11	"On the Line"	Michael Lembeck	Rick Hawkins	November 25, 1991	25.0
The Marines take over for civilian employees who strike to protest cutbacks at the base.
62	12	"The Shell Game"	Michael Lembeck	Jim Evering	December 9, 1991	24.3
A land developer's plan to build a mall on the site of Camp Hollister is thwarted by a nesting turtle.
63	13	"Who's That Blonde?"	Michael Lembeck	Renee Phillips, Carrie Honigblum	December 16, 1991	24.8
Gunny dyes her hair blond after the bill allowing women to be in combat fails; Lt. Holowachuk spruces up his "space."
64	14	"We've Got Trouble"	Michael Lembeck	Lisa Albert	January 6, 1992	24.9
Lt. Holowachuk and Gunny get competitive at pool.
65	15	"Three's a Crowd"	Michael Lembeck	Renee Phillips, Carrie Honigblum	January 13, 1992	25.1
Casey's new boyfriend likes hanging out with the Major.
66	16	"Three Angry Marines"	Michael Lembeck	Barry Gold	January 20, 1992	27.5
Gunny, Holowachuk, and the Major are assigned to a court-martial panel but have different opinions about the case. Meanwhile, General Craig is having difficulty with his temporary secretary.
67	17	"Close Encounters"	Michael Lembeck	Manny Basanese	February 3, 1992	27.2
The MacGillises participate in a marriage workshop during a weekend getaway.
68	18	"Base Desires"	Michael Lembeck	Dorothy Van	February 24, 1992	25.0
The MacGillises vie with another family to be military family of the year.
69	19	"When Gunny Talks"	Michael Lembeck	Barry Gold	March 2, 1992	24.5
Gunny gives successful investment tips to Elizabeth, who then becomes concerned only with making money.
70	20	"The 'L' Word"	Michael Lembeck	Renee Phillips, Carrie Honigblum	March 9, 1992	26.4
Elizabeth falls for her tutor (Eric Close); Gunny's beau says too much.
71	21	"Sick Bay"	Michael Lembeck	Manny Basanese	March 16, 1992	26.2
The Major writes an article on raising children for a bedridden Polly that doesn't sit well with her.
72	22	"Charlotte's Web"	Michael Lembeck	Lisa Albert	April 27, 1992	21.0
An "adopt-a-Marine" program pairs Holowachuk with a wild woman.
73	23	"The Noisy Drill Team"	Michael Lembeck	Jim Evering	May 4, 1992	21.8
General Craig prepares the base for inspection by the closure committee.
74	24	"In the Brick of Time"	Michael Lembeck	Rick Hawkins	May 11, 1992	23.7
Polly prepares an upbeat documentary on Camp Hollister's closing.

=== Season 4 (1992–93) ===
No. overall	No. in season	Title	Directed by	Written by	Original release date	Prod. code	Viewers (millions)
75	1	"The People's Choice: Part 1"	Howard Storm	Rick Hawkins	September 25, 1992	68601	15.3
The visit of the Major's father, Jake (Brian Keith), creates tension.
76	2	"The People's Choice: Part 2"	Howard Storm	Jim Evering	October 2, 1992	68602	15.2
Jake moves in with Lt. Holowachuk after a fight with the Major.
77	3	"Here's Looking at You, Pol"	Michael Lembeck	Barry Gold	October 16, 1992	68604	14.9
Just as Polly is running for mayor, revealing old photos of her hit the papers.
78	4	"Catered Affair"	Mary Lou Belli	Manny Basanese	October 23, 1992	68603	15.4
The Major must hire Elizabeth to cater a reception for a visiting general (Louis H. Wilson, Jr. as himself), which he is not too happy about.
79	5	"There's No Place Like Farlow"	Skip Collector	M.J. Cody & Chuck Bulot	October 30, 1992	68605	13.0
The effects of too much Halloween have gotten to Casey where she has nightmares that her sisters have zombified, then sees Lt. Howlachuck as Frankenstein's monster, Gunny as the Wicked Witch of the West and General Craig as the Phantom of the Opera. She is told it is not real by the Major, only to have him become a werewolf. Casey then wakes up with her family by her bed, realizing she only hallucinated from a bad fever.
80	6	"The Election Show"	Gerald McRaney	Carrie Honigblum & Renee Phillips	November 6, 1992	68608	14.0
The Major takes a leave of absence and goes with Polly on the election trail when she runs for mayor.
81	7	"Gunny's Veiled Threat"	Howard Storm	Liz Sage	November 13, 1992	68610	15.1
Gunny joins the Secret Service and becomes a harem member to guard a visiting emir.
82	8	"One for the Road"	Michael Lembeck	Carrie Honigblum & Renee Phillips	November 20, 1992	68607	14.7
Fearing a crash, Elizabeth won't drive her new car; General Craig is on crutches and creating havoc with them.
83	9	"Blue Tenant Holowachuk"	Jim Evering	Barry Gold	December 4, 1992	68609	13.4
Apartment manager Lt. Holowachuk backs a rent strike against the landlord, who happens to be General Craig.
84	10	"Old Acquaintance"	Skip Collector	Sydney Blake	December 18, 1992	68612	14.0
A change in her college friends disturbs a concerned Polly.
85	11	"About Face"	Jim Evering	Neil Lebowitz	January 8, 1993	68611	13.8
Everyone jumps to conclusions about General Craig's activities.
86	12	"I'll Be Seeing You"	Michael Lembeck	Liz Sage	January 15, 1993	68615	13.3
Polly is enlisted to be hostess of the '40s-themed USO ball, where new and old loves are sparked.
87	13	"Night School"	Michael Lembeck	Barry Gold	January 22, 1993	68614	12.2
In order to sharpen their service records, General Craig and the Major go to night school, where they are enrolled in a business course. As part of a project, the Major must "invent" something then pitch it, but his invention is stolen by the General. When Casey thinks of an idea for her troll doll, the Major pitches that, giving credit to Casey.
88	14	"Piano Lesson"	Michael Lembeck	Rick Hawkins	January 29, 1993	68613	N/A
The Major is embarrassed about taking piano lessons alongside little kids. Polly's middle name is revealed to be 'Esther', Polly Esther (polyester)
89	15	"Come Rain or Come Shine"	Michael Lembeck	Albert DaSilva & Kathryn Davison	February 5, 1993	68606	13.3
A corporate headhunter Mitch Hewitt (Gregory Itzin) woos several Marines.
90	16	"Colonel of Truth"	Michael Lembeck	Jim Evering	February 12, 1993	68619	16.2
After being denied a promotion, the Major considers leaving the Marines, much to the chagrin of his family. Meanwhile, Brigadier General Craig is promoted to Major General. He wears the two star rank the remainder of the series.
91	17	"From Russia with Like"	Michael Lembeck	Liz Sage	February 19, 1993	68620	15.2
The Major and a visiting Russian officer (Yakoff Smirnoff) compete. Complications arise when his son (who is visiting with him) and Elizabeth develop a mutual attraction to each other.
92	18	"The Spell of Grease Paint"	Michael Lembeck	Manny Basanese	March 5, 1993	68618	13.2
Polly's role in a play opposite Lt. Holowachuk makes the Major jealous, although he won't admit it.
93	19	"Gunny Gets Robbed"	Michael Lembeck	Carrie Honigblum & Renee Phillips	March 12, 1993	68616	13.1
Gunny's apartment is robbed. She seems matter-of-fact about it, but when she overreacts to someone not returning her pen, the Major sits her down to explain it is understandable to be upset about unfortunate events.
94	20	"Conduct Unbecoming"	Michael Lembeck	Manny Basanese & Carrie Honigblum	April 2, 1993	68621	14.3
Robin's new boyfriend is the son of another Marine officer. However, when the boy gets cut and Mac offers to dress the gash, he sees strange marks which lend evidence of abuse. The Major sees the boy's mother acts like a Stepford wife, so he asks Polly's help in getting her to open up. In a subplot, Lt. Holowachuk tries to fill his basketball team but finds complications when General Craig wants to play — and no one wants to guard him because he is the general. NOTE: Gerald McRaney and Nicole Dubuc, out-of-character, tell families about the rough nature of the episode in getting younger viewers to understand.
95	21	"General Disturbance"	Michael Lembeck	Liz Sage	April 9, 1993	68617	12.5
General Craig and Lt. Holowachuck are transferred to the White House. The new general is a stern disciplinarian whose aide behaves sycophantically. The new base commander has no tolerance for the Major's easygoing style of leadership, and creates extra work for Gunny with such minute details as ordering she dispose of colored thumbtacks. The Major and Gunny realize it was a good environment under General Craig and would give anything to work with him again. NOTE: This was the last episode shot, but debuted out of order as the penultimate. As such, it is considered the series finale.
96	22	"Oops, a Daisy"	Michael Lembeck	Jim Evering & Rick Hawkins & Barry Gold	May 17, 1993	68622	17.9
Casey has her 10th birthday and the Major gives her a Daisy rifle that he once owned as a little boy. This angers Polly, who does not want him teaching their daughters about shooting, whereas the Major protests he is passing on something he enjoyed.
