= List of Simon & Simon episodes =

The CBS television series Simon & Simon ran on CBS from November 24, 1981, to December 31, 1988, and subsequently in syndication from September 9 to 16, 1989 for its final two episodes. A total of 156 episodes were produced, spanning eight seasons.

== Series overview ==
Season	Episodes	Originally released	
Season	Episodes	First released	Last released
1	13	November 24, 1981	March 16, 1982
2	23	October 7, 1982	March 31, 1983
3	23	September 29, 1983	March 29, 1984
4	22	September 27, 1984	March 28, 1985
5	24	October 3, 1985	May 1, 1986
6	22	September 25, 1986	March 26, 1987
7	16	December 3, 1987	April 7, 1988
8	13	October 8, 1988	December 31, 1988

== Episodes ==
=== Season 1 (1981–82) ===
No. overall	No. in season	Title	Directed by	Written by	Original release date	Rating/share (households)
1	1	"Details at Eleven"	Corey Allen	Philip DeGuere	November 24, 1981	17.7/27
The Simons search for a newsanchor's stepdaugter who has connections to the mob.
2	2	"Love, Christy"	Bruce Bilson	James Crocker	December 1, 1981	12.3/19
The Simons attempt to bring back a stolen sports car.
3	3	"Trapdoors"	Alan J. Levi	Philip DeGuere	December 8, 1981	10.5/16
A bank official collaborates with a computer whiz to gain access to the bank's financial system.
4	4	"A Recipe for Disaster"	Mike Vejar	Richard Chapman	December 22, 1981	12.8/20
A kidnapping leads the Simons to cross paths with ruthless wildcatters.
5	5	"The Least Dangereous Game"	Alan J. Levi	Richard Chapman	December 29, 1981	15.9/25
At a zoo patron's request, the Simons investigate an animal keeper's death.
6	6	"The Dead Letter File"	Mike Vejar	Bob Shayne	January 5, 1982	15.4/22
A letter that's been lost in the mail for 20 years contains evidence vital to a murder case.
7	7	"The Hottest Ticket in Town"	Ray Austin	Bob Shayne	January 12, 1982	14.5/20
A rock-concert promoter gets suckered into an ingenious ticket-scalping operation.
8	8	"Ashes to Ashes, and None Too Soon"	Sigmund Neufeld, Jr.	Bob Shayne	January 19, 1982	15.1/23
A man commits suicide after the Simons serve him divorce papers.
9	9	"The Uncivil Servant"	Ray Austin	Karen Harris	January 26, 1982	16.4/25
Myron hires the Simons to find the thief who stole a file from his office.
10	10	"Earth to Stacey"	Paul Krasny	James Crocker	February 9, 1982	15.2/22
The Simons are forced to put up with a client's intention to humiliate the man who left her at the altar.
11	11	"Double Entry"	Alan J. Levi	Robert Bielak	March 2, 1982	13.4/20
The probing of a wayward husband becomes a kidnapping case.
12	12	"Matchmaker"	Vincent McEveety	Ruel Fischmann & Richard Pierce	March 9, 1982	11.0/17
An insurance-company rep hires the Simons to find stolen antiques - and their investigation leads them to a dating service.
13	13	"Tanks for the Memories"	Paul Krasny	Richard Chapman	March 16, 1982	12.8/20
The Simons wind up in the cross-fire between a gunrunner and the FBI during their search for class reunion grads.

=== Season 2 (1982–83) ===
No. overall	No. in season	Title	Directed by	Written by	Original release date	Prod. code	Rating/share (households)
14	1	"Emeralds Are Not a Girl's Best Friend"	Lawrence Doheny	Story by : Michael Sloan & Glen A. Larson & Philip DeGuere; Teleplay by : Bob Shayne & Richard Chapman	October 7, 1982	57511	24.8/36
The Simons team up with Thomas Magnum's associate Jonathan Higgins to catch a con artist who's headed to Latin America with money she stole from an orphanage benefit. Note: This episode concludes a crossover event that begins on Magnum, P.I. season 3 episode 3.
15	2	"Mike & Pat"	Sigmund Neufeld, Jr.	Richard Chapman	October 14, 1982	57509	20.5/32
A kidnapped dolphin's mate is the only witness the Simons have in the case.
16	3	"Guessing Game"	Vincent McEveety	James S. Crocker	October 21, 1982	57503	21.3/33
A psychic hires the Simons to find out if her visions are accurate.
17	4	"Art for Arthur's Sake"	Vincent McEveety	Bob Shayne	October 28, 1982	57501	19.8/31
The Simons are tasked with retrieving a painting stolen from a Navy museum.
18	5	"The Ten Thousand Dollar Deductible"	Bernard McEveety	Bill Dial	November 4, 1982	57507	20.2/31
When A.J. is robbed of a necklace he was delivering, the FBI suspects a scam.
19	6	"Rough Rider Rides Again"	Burt Kennedy	Michael Piller	November 18, 1982	57512	18.6/28
A former screen cowboy Stuart Whitman hires the Simons to clear him of the murder of his former producer Broderick Crawford, when a younger actor is hired for the upcoming movie. Pat Buttram as Jonathan Evans. Alan Hale Jr. cast as saloon keeper. John Russell, Jock Mahoney & Hal Needham portray former Western cowboy icons.
20	7	"Sometimes Dreams Come True"	Bernard McEveety	James S. Crocker	December 2, 1982	57504	22.3/34
A stewardess vanishes without a trace. Her identical twin sister, a 6th grade teacher, is haunted by lucid, semi-violent dreams about the disappearance. Although the authorities are hesitant to help, Janet, now an ADA, calls in a favor to Rick & AJ. It turns out that the twin is merely having a surreptitious affair with a local politician, however a wealthy, twisted stalker with a criminal record, and an undiscovered murder, is infatuated with the stewardess twin. Jonathan Banks plays Alan Wyncoop, the deranged stalker.
21	8	"The Last Time I Saw Michael"	Vincent McEveety	James S. Crocker	December 9, 1982	57505	20.6/31
A friend of the Simons' claims that her husband who was lost at sea is alive - and in need of $500,000.
22	9	"Fowl Play"	Burt Kennedy	Donald R. Boyle	December 16, 1982	57506	20.5/31
A pro football player intends to stop fixing games, but his employers have other plans.
23	10	"Thin Air"	Bernard McEveety	Teleplay by : Bob Shayne & Philip DeGuere; Based on a novel by: Howard Browne.	December 30, 1982	57502	19.9/33
Rick's ex-girlfriend gets arrested for her husband's murder after she hires the Simons to find him.
24	11	"Murder Between the Lines"	Sigmund Neufeld, Jr.	Mike Lloyd Ross	January 6, 1983	57514	21.5/32
A novelist (Ray Walston) recognizes two murders as being similar to the ones in his book, so he tries to forestall the third killing in his book - a novelist's electrocution - before the same thing happens to him.
25	12	"Psyched Out"	Sigmund Neufeld, Jr.	Paul Magistretti	January 13, 1983	57510	21.5/32
The Simons go undercover as students to probe a track star's fatal fall from the roof of his frat house.
26	13	"Pirate's Key"	Corey Allen	Philip DeGuere	January 20, 1983	83479	21.9/32
27	14	"Pirate's Key"	Corey Allen	Philip DeGuere	January 20, 1983	83479	21.9/32
When the Simons wreck an enemy's car, it reopens an old case that could cost them their licenses. They travel to Florida to investigate a husband's death only to have a run-in with the authorities.
28	15	"The Club Murder Vacation"	Burt Kennedy	Bill Dial	January 27, 1983	57523	24.0/35
While on vacation in Northern California, A.J. sees a possible murder, but the sheriff pays no mind.
29	16	"It's Only a Game"	Vincent McEveety	Richard Chapman	February 3, 1983	57522	20.7/30
The Simons' coroner friend entrusts them to deliver a supposed video game to Las Vegas.
30	17	"A Design for Killing"	Bernard McEveety	James S. Crocker	February 10, 1983	57519	14.6/20
The Simons' task of protecting a designer's collection is complicated by a photographer's murder.
31	18	"The List"	Burt Kennedy	Michael Piller	February 17, 1983	57521	21.5/32
A woman hires the Simons to prove she's innocent in the murder of a publisher who was about to name her as one of San Diego's sexiest women.
32	19	"What's in a Gnome?"	Sigmund Neufeld, Jr.	Paul Magistretti	February 24, 1983	57519	21.4/32
The Simons are hired to catch a phantom who's sabotaging an amusement park.
33	20	"The Secret of the Chrome Eagle"	Vincent McEveety	Mike Lloyd Ross	March 3, 1983	57525	21.5/32
The Simons are unaware that the classic car they're transporting contains secret cargo and a very dangerous passenger.
34	21	"Room 3502"	Sigmund Neufeld, Jr.	Alan Brennert	March 10, 1983	57524	21.5/32
A husband hires the Simons to find his wife when she vanishes from their hotel room in the middle of the night.
35	22	"Red Dog Blues"	Vincent McEveety	Deborah R. Baron & Patricia Rae Moran	March 24, 1983	57515	20.3/31
A politician kills someone who was about to expose him for taking bribes and frames the victim's bookkeeper.
36	23	"The Skeleton Who Came Out of the Closet"	Paul Krasny	James S. Crocker	March 31, 1983	57527	22.9/36
The Simons are hired to take an unstable mental patient to another hospital.

=== Season 3 (1983–84) ===
No. overall	No. in season	Title	Directed by	Written by	Original release date	Rating/share (households)
37	1	"Grand Illusion"	Vincent McEveety	E. Jack Kaplan	September 29, 1983	23.3/36
A magician dies performing a trick he was suspected of stealing from his rival.
38	2	"DJ DOA"	Christian I. Nyby II	James Crocker	October 6, 1983	21.8/34
An eccentric DJ believes she saw another DJ being kidnapped from a studio.
39	3	"I Heard It Was Murder"	Christian I. Nyby II	Story by : David Douglas Sher; Teleplay by : Bill Dial	October 13, 1983	26.0/39
The Simons are tasked with protecting a blind woman who heard a murder take place.
40	4	"Bail Out"	Vincent McEveety	Paul Magistretti	October 20, 1983	26.6/40
The Simons investigate the death of a record executive that may not have been accidental.
41	5	"Fly the Alibi Skies"	Vincent McEveety	Tom Porter	October 27, 1983	24.0/38
The Simons enlist the aid of whiz kid Richie Adler in a murder investigation. Note: This episode is a crossover with Whiz Kids.
42	6	"Shadow of Sam Penny"	Vincent McEveety	Michael Piller	November 3, 1983	23.0/34
The Simons help the detective who caught the original thieves in a missing-jewels case that has been reopened 30 years later.
43	7	"Caught Between the Devil and the Deep Blue Sea"	Sigmund Neufeld, Jr.	Gary Kemper	November 10, 1983	24.9/36
Detective Downtown Brown helps the Simons look for a cop who disappeared after a fur-theft bust left two officers dead.
44	8	"The Bare Facts"	Sigmund Neufeld, Jr.	Ruel Fischmann	November 17, 1983	25.2/37
Rick and A.J. go 'under cover' to infiltrate an exclusive nudist colony, the last known whereabouts of a missing contractor they've been hired to find.
45	9	"Too Much of a Good Thing"	Gary Grillo	George Geiger	December 1, 1983	24.0/36
The Simons track a missing chemist to a citrus farm that's using an illegal insecticide.
46	10	"Betty Grable Flies Again"	Burt Kennedy	Story by : Arthur Alsberg & Don Nelson; Teleplay by : Timothy Burns	December 8, 1983	24.7/37
A pilot who's been convicted of abandoning his crew during World War II hires the Simons to find a B-25 that may prove his innocence.
47	11	"Bon Voyage, Alonso"	Roy Campanella, Jr.	Story by : Mike Lloyd Ross and William M. Whitehead; Teleplay by : William M. Whitehead	December 15, 1983	22.5/35
A group of hijackers take over a cruise ship carrying Rick, Cecilia and their charges.
48	12	"All Your Favorite Games"	Vincent McEveety	Don M. Mankiewicz	December 22, 1983	24.7/37
The Simons attempt to protect a gambler whose testimony could put a gambling boss in jail.
49	13	"John Doe"	Gary Grillo	Bruce Cervi	January 5, 1984	25.4/38
A man who's unable to remember the last three months of his life hires the Simons to find out why he's been charged with murder.
50	14	"Dear Lovesick"	Bernard L. Kowalski	John Kostmayer	January 12, 1984	24.1/37
An advice columnist asks for the Simons' help when letters from a reader suggest that a murder is about to happen.
51	15	"Bloodlines"	Burt Kennedy	Phil Combest	January 19, 1984	24.1/35
While on the trail of a trainer's stolen mare, the Simons discover a connection to the death of the trainer's father, who was killed in a race accident years ago.
52	16	"Heels and Toes"	Georg Fenady	Jim Tisdale	February 2, 1984	22.7/33
The Simons are hired as a prima ballerina's protectors.
53	17	"The Wrong Stuff"	Vincent McEveety	Alan Brennert	February 9, 1984	26.4/38
The release of a porno film that's been in the vault for years could lead to consequences for the teacher who's the star and a former astronaut who's the producer.
54	18	"Double Play"	Burt Kennedy	Michael Piller	February 16, 1984	22.1/32
The Simons' search for the person who framed them for stealing securities leads to a celebrity-lookalike escort service.
55	19	"Under the Knife"	Gerald McRaney	Story by : Kenneth Brooten & Stuart Chapman and Timothy Burns; Teleplay by : Timothy Burns	February 23, 1984	23.9/36
A surgeon hires the Simons to find proof that the plaintiff in a malpractice suit is faking his paralysis just to get $6 million.
56	20	"Harm's Way"	Sigmund Neufeld, Jr.	Richard Chapman & Philip DeGuere	March 1, 1984	24.4/36
A woman who hired the Simons to find her ex-husband is actually part of group trying to bump off a Federal agent standing in the way of an assassination plot.
57	21	"The Dillinger Print"	Vincent McEveety	Story by : Harry Butler & Logan Clarke and William M. Whitehead; Teleplay by : William M. Whitehead	March 8, 1984	25.2/37
John Dillinger is implicated in the murder of a retired FBI agent.
58	22	"Corpus Delecti"	Kim Manners	Mike Lloyd Ross	March 22, 1984	23.7/36
Even though the Simons are expected to gain a $120,000 commission, they find it suspicious that the clues in an insurance investigation have come together too easily.
59	23	"The Disappearance of Harry the Hat"	Vincent McEveety	Phil Combest	March 29, 1984	25.0/39
The Simons are hired to help a timid accountant create a new identity, but the accountant has yet to reveal his old identity.

=== Season 4 (1984–85) ===
No. overall	No. in season	Title	Directed by	Written by	Original release date	Rating/share (households)
60	1	"C'est Simon"	Christian I. Nyby II	Philip DeGuere & Richard Chapman	September 27, 1984	18.2/29
61	2	"C'est Simon"	Christian I. Nyby II	Philip DeGuere & Richard Chapman	September 27, 1984	18.2/29
Cecilia calls the Simons to Paris where they suspect her missing gentleman friend of being a high-arms dealer. When Cecilia is kidnapped, the Simons must put their plan to go undercover as arms buyers on hold to rescue her. This was the final episode to be written or co-written by series creator Philip DeGuere.
62	3	"A Little Wine with Murder"	Vincent McEveety	Lee Maddux	October 4, 1984	22.0/33
The Simons investigate the murder of a food critic, who may have caused a deal to buy a restaurant chain to fall through.
63	4	"The Dark Side of the Street"	Sigmund Neufeld, Jr.	James Crocker	October 18, 1984	21.2/32
The Simons are hired to find out who's been sending threats to keep a groom-to-be from marrying the boss's daughter.
64	5	"Manna from Heaven"	Dennis Donnelly	Bob Shayne	October 25, 1984	24.2/37
Rick is charged with murder when the loan officer who repossessed his boat is found dead.
65	6	"What Goes Around Comes Around"	Dennis Donnelly	Story by : Bruce Ferber & David Lerner; Teleplay by : David Brown	November 1, 1984	18.7/28
A racecar driver hires the Simons to probe his streak of bad luck that's caused by mechanical malfunctions.
66	7	"Who Killed the Sixties?"	Vincent McEveety	Michael Piller	November 8, 1984	21.7/33
A.J.'s old girlfriend believes that her brother's murder happened somewhere other than at a peace concert 18 years ago.
67	8	"Break a Leg, Darling"	Kim Manners	Michael Genelin	November 15, 1984	23.6/37
The Simons must figure out who's trying to kill an actress whose feud with her co-star ex-husband has become widely publicized.
68	9	"Almost Completely Out of Circulation"	Sigmund Neufeld, Jr.	Paul Robert Coyle	November 22, 1984	19.5/34
A murdered cartoonist's work may give clues to the identity of the killer.
69	10	"Our Fair City"	Vincent McEveety	Ross Thomas	November 29, 1984	24.5/37
The prime suspect in the murder of a police chief is the town mayor - her ex-husband.
70	11	"Deep Cover"	Vincent McEveety	Thomas Perry	December 6, 1984	22.6/34
The Simons must protect a TV reporter who's put a hit on himself as part of a crime-organization exposé.
71	12	"Revolution #9 1/2"	Dennis Donnelly	Alan Brennert	December 13, 1984	20.6/31
The Simons attempt to help their uncle find his business partner - only to get involved in a revolution.
72	13	"Yes, Virginia, There Is a Liberace"	Vincent McEveety	James Crocker	December 20, 1984	23.4/35
The Simons spend Christmas Eve looking all over Las Vegas for a girl's missing father, who was trying to win enough to pay off debts.
73	14	"Almost Foolproof"	Gary Grillo	Timothy Burns	January 3, 1985	27.0/39
A woman is forcibly admitted to a hospital that's a front for a medical-payment scam - just like the skid-row denizens she'd been helping.
74	15	"Enter the Jaguar"	Roy Campanella, Jr.	Alan Brennert	January 17, 1985	22.5/33
The Simons are unwilling to believe evidence that suggests their client - a bird-watching professor - is actually an international jewel thief.
75	16	"Simon Without Simon: Part 1"	Vincent McEveety	Richard Chapman & Bill Dial	January 24, 1985	22.7/34
After the Simons solve a major case, the growing wealth and fame allow them to start separate careers.
76	17	"Simon Without Simon: Part 2"	Paul Krasny	George Geiger	January 31, 1985	22.5/32
The Simons become the prime suspects in their celebrated big bust.
77	18	"Slither"	Gerald McRaney	Gina Goldman	February 7, 1985	22.4/32
A teenager who's gotten off drugs runs away when he's framed for possession.
78	19	"The Mickey Mouse Mob"	Sigmund Neufeld, Jr.	Ross Thomas	February 14, 1985	22.8/34
The Simons get involved in a mob power struggle when a blackmail victim running for a union office hires them.
79	20	"Mummy Talks"	Kim Manners	Robert K. Wilcox and Terrell Tannen	February 21, 1985	22.4/34
A student intends to find out how the mummy of a Pharaoh wound up in a museum's storage room.
80	21	"Marlowe, Come Home"	Sigmund Neufeld, Jr.	Story by : David R. Toddman and Michael Piller; Teleplay by : Michael Piller	February 28, 1985	23.2/35
Rick takes the search for a show dog personally when the dog-nappers take his own dog.
81	22	"Out-of-Town Brown"	Vincent McEveety	Tim Reid	March 28, 1985	21.6/33
The Simons help Downtown look for his cousin - a student who's been framed for murder after discovering dead livestock on a ranch.

=== Season 5 (1985–86) ===
No. overall	No. in season	Title	Directed by	Written by	Original release date	Prod. code	Rating/share (households)
82	1	"Love and/or Marriage"	Vincent McEveety	Michael Piller	October 3, 1985	60116	19.3/29
Rick finds himself falling for a client just as he and A.J. are hired to find her missing husband.
83	2	"Burden of the Beast"	Sigmund Neufeld, Jr.	Story by : Paul Magistretti & Paul Robert Coyle; Teleplay by : Paul Robert Coyle	October 10, 1985	60105	20.2/31
A chimpanzee is the only witness to an animal researcher's murder.
84	3	"The Third Eye"	Burt Kennedy	Thomas & Jo Perry	October 17, 1985	60111	19.8/30
A writer who specializes in "participatory journalism" is set up for murder when he becomes an apprentice to the Simons.
85	4	"Enchilada Express"	Sigmund Neufeld, Jr.	Story by : B.W. Sandefur; Teleplay by : Reed Moran	October 24, 1985	60104	18.1/26
The Simons probe a quickie-divorce resort in Mexico that's costing some husbands a rather high price for their freedom.
86	5	"The Skull of Nostradamus"	Sigmund Neufeld, Jr.	Reed Moran	October 31, 1985	60122	17.0/26
The Simons must find out who's trying to scare an apprentice who's supposedly under a spell.
87	6	"Have You Hugged Your Private Detective Today?"	Kim Manners	Story by : Paul L. Ehrmann & Craig Buck; Teleplay by : Thomas & Jo Perry	November 7, 1985	60125	15.6/22
A TV-sex therapist hires the Simons to find out who murdered a sex surrogate.
88	7	"Reunion at Alcatraz"	Vincent McEveety	Michael Piller	November 14, 1985	60128	19.0/29
The Simons reunite with Sam Penny and help him catch a con artist who escaped from Alcatraz in 1962.
89	8	"Down Home Country Blues"	Vincent McEveety	Story by : Darrell Fetty & Ramsay King; Teleplay by : Terrell Tannen	November 21, 1985	60123	15.6/23
A country singer goes on the road with his son after accepting a seemingly generous offer for some of his songs.
90	9	"Quint is Out"	Sigmund Neufeld, Jr.	Bill Dial	December 5, 1985	60134	17.5/26
Quint, a vengeful ex-con whom the Simons helped put in jail, is unable to get near them, so he hatches a scheme to lure them to him.
91	10	"Walk a Mile in My Hat"	Vincent McEveety	Richard Chapman	December 12, 1985	60114	17.5/26
While A.J.'s on vacation, the agency is offered $10,000, seeking A.J.'s business acumen, which requires Rick to poses as him, to gain the client. When a million-dollar deal leads to murder, A.J. must pose as Rick upon returning. The Simon's live are in danger after Gerry is discovered hiding a corpse. Terry Kiser as Gerry Marsh.
92	11	"Facets"	Burt Kennedy	Diane Saunders	December 26, 1985	60103	17.8/28
While the Simons investigate a valuable gem theft, A.J. accidentally shoots a Romeo, sparking a feud between two families with rival jewelry businesses.
93	12	"Sunrise at Camp Apollo"	Kim Manners	Steve Stoliar	January 2, 1986	60131	18.3/26
The Simons work undercover as camp counselors at a camp for street kids to investigate burglaries in an upscale neighborhood, ones that have locals demanding the camp's shut-down. The proud teens resist help but when Julio is arrested for murder, the PI's have ideas about kindly Ross Garrett and the wealthy kids who hang out at his pharmacy.
94	13	"The Blue Chip Stomp"	Dennis Donnelly	Gary Rosen	January 16, 1986	60130	18.2/26
Stanley Tate is a highly recruited basketball star being pressured by his indebted brother Gordon, to make easy money from gamblers. When a recruiter is murdered, AJ and Rick are on the case, to help the young men suspected of the deed, while busting the gambling syndicate. Daphne Reid as reporter Temple Hill
95	14	"Something for Sarah"	Dennis Donnelly	Terrell Tannen	January 23, 1986	60124	21.2/31
Sarah Jean finds a cash filled suitcase on her porch and hires the Simon brothers to locate its owner. Rick and AJ trace it to her long missing father Ben, who admits it came from a disrupted drug transaction, making the dealer very angry and very anxious for its return.
96	15	"Mobile Home of the Brave"	Burt Kennedy	Story by : Paul Schiffer; Teleplay by : Elia Katz & Michael Cassutt	January 30, 1986	60113	17.6/25
A paparazzo named Harrison captures noted mobster Manny Crobett on film, but when pursued, switches the roll with the vacationing Johnson family. AJ and Rick take the family under their protection, but their vacation at a theme park is now plagued with disasters, making the park area a dangerous place to be.
97	16	"Family Forecast"	Burt Kennedy	Story by : Peter Fox; Teleplay by : Peter Fox and Thomas & Jo Perry	February 6, 1986	60118	17.5/25
The Simons go on a game show that the host believes is rigged - because he was once involved in a scandal himself.
98	17	"A Significant Obsession"	Gerald McRaney	Story by : Bonnie Parker; Teleplay by : Michael Piller	February 13, 1986	60137	15.6/22
The Simons' investigation of espionage at a laser lab is complicated by an old client who's become obsessed with A.J.
99	18	"For the People"	Judith Vogelsang	Story by : Bill Dial & Michael Genelin; Teleplay by : Michael Genelin	February 20, 1986	60117	15.7/23
When the Simons are made prosecution witnesses in a murder trial, they come to suspect that the accused may be innocent, so they start their own investigation.
100	19	"Full Moon Blues"	Burt Kennedy	Thomas & Jo Perry and Richard Chapman	March 6, 1986	60153	15.1/22
The Simons get caught between the Feds and the mob when they're blamed for a witness's death.
101	20	"Eye of the Beholder"	Sigmund Neufeld, Jr.	Story by : Seth Weisbord; Teleplay by : Phil Combest	March 13, 1986	60136	15.2/23
An industrialist hires the Simons to guard a cursed medallion and keep an eye on his daughters.
102	21	"D-I-V-O-R-C-E"	Burt Kennedy	Richard Chapman	March 27, 1986	60150	14.0/22
The Simons are hired by opposing sides in a divorce case - and come to suspect that someone wants the divorce more than the husband and wife.
103	22	"Act Five"	Sigmund Neufeld, Jr.	Michael Piller	April 3, 1986	60108	19.4/29
The Simons enlist Downtown's con artist cousin to swindle a client who swindled them.
104	23	"The Last Harangue"	Burt Kennedy	Tom Ropelewski	April 10, 1986	60155	15.4/23
A.J. is drawn into a race for city council, while Rick investigates a case that links his brother's opponent to toxic-waste dumping and murder.
105	24	"The Apple Doesn't Fall Far from the Tree"	Vincent McEveety	Michael Piller & Richard Chapman	May 1, 1986	60143	11.6/19
The Simons travel to Boston and Florida to find out why thugs are trying to steal the family journal.

=== Season 6 (1986–87) ===
No. overall	No. in season	Title	Directed by	Written by	Original release date	Rating/share (households)
106	1	"Competition--Who Needs It?"	Bob Sweeney	Stephen A. Miller	September 25, 1986	11.3/18
While investigating the explosion of a charter-boat operator's vessel, the Simons run afoul of the PI firm representing her insurance company.
107	2	"A.W.O.L."	Vincent McEveety	Story by : Andrew Sipes; Teleplay by : Richard C. Okie and Andrew Sipes	October 2, 1986	11.8/18
The Simons try to help a sailor who's gone AWOL after being set up for possession of coke.
108	3	"Still Phil After All These Years"	Vincent McEveety	Story by : Thomas Perry & Jo Perry; Teleplay by : Richard C. Okie	October 9, 1986	12.0/18
A.J. and Rick dig up a time capsule for Cecilia's high-school reunion - and discover evidence in a 40-year-old murder case.
109	4	"The Cop Who Came to Dinner"	Gerald McRaney	Story by : Michael Cassutt; Teleplay by : W. Reed Moran	October 16, 1986	13.0/20
Downtown is invited to stay with the Simons when he gets injured, but he forgets to tell them about the threat on his life.
110	5	"Treasure"	Bob Sweeney	David Moessinger	October 23, 1986	14.8/22
A.J. falls for the daughter of an industrialist, who's on a gold-prospecting expedition, and the girl has offered A.J. and Rick $20,000 to protect him.
111	6	"The Last Big Break"	Sigmund Neufeld, Jr.	Thomas Perry & Jo Perry	October 30, 1986	13.1/19
A surfer who supposedly drowned 20 years ago is alive - and a target for murder.
112	7	"The Rookie"	Michael Caffey	James J. Docherty	November 6, 1986	13.3/19
A rookie cop believes her partner is doing drugs.
113	8	"Like Father, Like Son"	Vincent McEveety	Story by : Fred McKnight and David Moessinger; Teleplay by : David Moessinger	November 13, 1986	13.1/19
The Simons are tasked with protecting the son of a TV reporter who was murdered before he could expose a boxing promoter.
114	9	"The Case of Don Diablo"	Sigmund Neufeld Jr.	Richard C. Okie	November 20, 1986	16.6/25
The owner of ad-agency that just had a contest gone awry asks the Simons to find the hidden case of Cucaracha Cooler before the public does.
115	10	"Mrs. Simon & Mrs. Simon"	Vincent McEveety	Thomas Perry & Jo Perry	December 4, 1986	12.4/18
The Simons fake marry a pair of Greek flight attendants to keep them in America since they witnessed a murder before they left Greece.
116	11	"Just Because I'm Paranoid"	Judith Vogelsang	Stephen A. Miller	December 11, 1986	11.7/18
At first, the Simons believe that a marathoner who asked them to protect them from an alleged stalker is just being paranoid - until someone bombs their office and assaults A.J.
117	12	"Tonsillitis"	Judith Vogelsang	Paul Magistretti	December 18, 1986	11.5/18
Rick goes to the hospital for a tonsillectomy where he thinks he saw a murder while under anesthesia.
118	13	"Deep Water Death"	Burt Kennedy	Fred McKnight	January 8, 1987	15.5/22
Old enemies are plotting to dig up payment in a coke deal.
119	14	"For Old Crime's Sake"	Sigmund Neufeld, Jr.	Lee Sheldon	January 15, 1987	13.4/19
The Simons try to stop three bank robbers from the Prohibition who intend to settle a 50-year-old score.
120	15	"Opposites Attack"	Michael Caffey	Story by : Paul Cajero; Teleplay by : Stephen A. Miller	January 29, 1987	14.2/20
The Simons make a reluctant alliance with a pair of female PIs in the search for stolen swords.
121	16	"Judgement Call"	Burt Kennedy	Richard C. Okie	February 5, 1987	12.9/19
Downtown puts his plan to propose to Temple on hold when they disagree on the innocence of a man arrested in a shootout.
122	17	"Tanner P.I. for Hire"	Sigmund Neufeld, Jr.	Rogers Turrentine	February 12, 1987	13.4/20
A charming TV detective gets abducted at a PI convention that made him the guest of honor.
123	18	"Ancient Echoes"	Burt Kennedy	Tim Reid	February 19, 1987	13.6/20
A Native American asks the Simons to find his nephew who had vanished upon discovering artifacts at a construction site.
124	19	"Second Story Simons"	Vincent McEveety	Story by : Bonnie Parker; Teleplay by : Jerome Lew	February 26, 1987	12.5/18
The Simons get back stolen top-secret files from a Yugoslavian envoy, then are told to return them to the FBI so they can catch the thief with the evidence.
125	20	"I Thought the War Was Over"	David Moessinger	Story by : Gerald McRaney and Bill Dial; Teleplay by : Gerald McRaney, Bill Dial and David Moessinger	March 5, 1987	13.7/20
Rick becomes obsessed with finding the people who killed his Vietnam War buddy.
126	21	"Lost Lady"	Vincent McEveety	Lee Sheldon	March 12, 1987	10.0/15
A.J.'s long-lost fiancee turns up at a hospital for a drug overdose - and has no memory of the last eight years.
127	22	"Walking Point"	Sigmund Neufeld, Jr.	Story by : Christopher Templeton; Teleplay by : Richard C. Okie	March 26, 1987	14.6/22
A.J.'s client thinks he's selling out to the doctor she's suing for malpractice.

=== Season 7 (1987–88) ===
No. overall	No. in season	Title	Directed by	Written by	Original release date	Rating/share (households)
128	1	"New Cop in Town"	David Moessinger	Fred McKnight	December 3, 1987	11.5/18
The Simons clash with Downtown's replacement, who prosecutes them for withholding evidence in a murder/auto-theft case.
129	2	"Desperately Seeking Dacody"	Vincent McEveety	Karen Klein	December 10, 1987	13.1/20
A reporter resumes her bumpy relationship with Rick when she hires him and A.J. to prove a man is innocent in a series of crimes.
130	3	"You, Too, Can Be a Detective"	Sigmund Neufeld, Jr.	Richard C. Okie	December 17, 1987	11.7/19
An overeager former flight attendant, who's impressed with Rick's recently-published exploits, appoints herself as a "sister" to the Simons to investigate her friend's suspicious behavior.
131	4	"Shadows"	Sigmund Neufeld, Jr.	Sylvia Stoddard & Steven C. Smith	January 7, 1988	15.4/23
A young runaway steals A.J.'s wallet and Rick's camera - because she's an abused prostitute trying to save her dying friend.
132	5	"Second Swell"	Gerald McRaney	Art Monterastelli	January 14, 1988	12.7/19
A.J. reunites with his high-school sweetheart, while a killer from his past comes back for revenge.
133	6	"Forever Hold Your Piece"	Sigmund Neufeld, Jr.	Rick Mittleman	January 21, 1988	13.0/19
When Rick's client in a divorce case gets accused of murder, he works with a pair of shabby PIs who claim to have information.
134	7	"Tale of the Tiger"	Sigmund Neufeld, Jr.	Story by : Michael Humm; Teleplay by : Karen Klein	January 28, 1988	12.8/20
Rick is unwilling to accept that his old Army buddy is the head of a Vietnamese mob.
135	8	"Nuevo Salvador"	Vincent McEveety	Richard C. Okie	February 4, 1988	11.9/18
A Salvadoran death squad tries to get past the Simons in order to apprehend a relief worker helping refugees.
136	9	"Bad Betty"	Bernard McEveety	Art Monterastelli	February 11, 1988	13.3/20
The Simons have to catch a thief before a determined bounty hunter can take him back to Detroit.
137	10	"Baja, Humbug"	Don Weis	Stephen A. Miller	February 18, 1988	12.6/18
A.J's attempts to write a novel and Rick's plan to open a charter business in Baja get sidetracked by their involvement with a weapon-trafficking ring.
138	11	"A Firm Grasp of Reality"	Sigmund Neufeld, Jr.	Jim McGrath	February 25, 1988	12.7/18
The Simons go undercover at a mental hospital to protect a biochemist who's had a breakdown after claiming to be assaulted.
139	12	"Ties That Bind"	Paul Cajero	Nancy Bond	March 3, 1988	12.1/18
The Simons investigate the cocaine-dealing brother of their trusting cop friend.
140	13	"Little Boy Dead"	Vincent McEveety	Fred McKnight	March 10, 1988	10.3/16
The Simons help Abby get through her guilt after she shoots a boy while chasing a robbery suspect.
141	14	"Sudden Storm"	David Moessinger	David Moessinger	March 17, 1988	12.7/20
Against Abby's direct orders, A.J. and Rick go after two likely suspects after Cecilia is raped.
142	15	"Something Special"	Vincent McEveety	Story by : Bonnie Parker; Teleplay by : Bonnie Parker and Norman Hudis	March 31, 1988	12.1/20
A charming architect asks the Simons for help when extortionist threatens her company and her life.
143	16	"May the Road Rise Up"	Vincent McEveety	Richard C. Okie	April 7, 1988	13.7/22
After seeing their father's old car, long thought to be destroyed in the accident that took his life, the brothers dig into the details of the crash and the real story behind their father's death, which forces them to face emotions long thought to be buried, as well as a possible cover-up.

=== Season 8 (1988–89) ===
No. overall	No. in season	Title	Directed by	Written by	Original release date	U.S. viewers (millions)	Rating/share (households)
144	1	"Beauty and Deceased"	Vincent McEveety	Tom Ropelewski, Bob Shayne and W. Reed Moran	October 8, 1988	11.1	7.3/13
A.J. goes undercover in the swimsuit portion of a modeling contest to catch a blackmailer.
145	2	"Simon & Simon and Associates"	Sigmund Neufeld, Jr.	Mark A. Burley & John Blumenthal	October 15, 1988	15.0	9.8/17
The Simons get more than they bargained for when they decide to add "& Associates" to their business.
146	3	"Zen and the Art of the Split Finger Fastball"	Vincent McEveety	Thomas Perry & Jo Perry	October 22, 1988	9.7	6.3/11
The Simons search for answers at a fantasy baseball camp where they're tasked with protecting a Japanese businessman from a killer.
147	4	"The Merry Adventures of Robert Hood"	Sigmund Neufeld, Jr.	Story by : Nicholas Green and Richard C. Okie; Teleplay by : Richard C. Okie	October 29, 1988	11.2	7.6/14
A.J. attempts to protect a damsel in distress from an evil banker when a modern-day Robin Hood steals his gold card and charges for the poor.
148	5	"Ain't Gonna Get It from Me, Jack"	Sigmund Neufeld, Jr.	Martin Pasko & Rebecca Parr	November 5, 1988	9.6	6.4/11
After ripping apart the Simons on his program, a talk-show host hires them to find out who's sending him death threats.
149	6	"Love Song of Abigail Marsh"	Judith Vogelsang	Jim McGrath	November 12, 1988	10.7	7.0/12
The romance between Abby and the Simons' latest client is jeopardized by the fact that they were once on different sides of the law.
150	7	"Simon & Simon, Jr."	Richard C. Okie	Jeffrey Stepakoff	November 19, 1988	9.4	6.5/11
Rick discovers he has a teenage son, who has a murderer after him because the boy saw him.
151	8	"Cloak of Danger"	Judith Vogelsang	Jim McGrath	December 3, 1988	8.6	5.7/10
A.J. produces a play based on an unsolved murder case, which attracts the real culprit bent on keeping the surprise ending a secret.
152	9	"The Richer They Are, the Harder They Fall"	Sigmund Neufeld, Jr.	Rick Mittleman	December 10, 1988	10.3	6.8/12
The death of an heir, who was A.J.'s best friend, seems suspicious, so the Simons break into high society to investigate.
153	10	"Play It Again, Simon"	Jackie Cooper	Richard C. Okie	December 17, 1988	10.5	6.8/12
A.J. takes on the personality of a hard-nosed detective in the search for a mystery writer's missing manuscript.
154	11	"First, Let's Kill All the Lawyers"	Sigmund Neufeld, Jr.	Story by : Alan Brennert; Teleplay by : Alan Brennert and Phil Combest	December 31, 1988	9.2	6.2/13
Rick tries to settle out of court after Cecilia's lawyer friend grills him on the stand in the case of a murdered law student.
155	12	"Photo Finished"	Jackie Cooper	Story by : Bonnie Parker; Teleplay by : Bonnie Parker and Rick Mittleman	September 9, 1989 (in syndication)	N/A	N/A
A politician hires the Simons to find out if his wife is having an affair, but when the woman is found dead, they end up investigating her murder.
156	13	"Simon Says Goodbye"	Gerald McRaney	Martin Pasko & Rebecca Parr	September 16, 1989 (in syndication)	N/A	N/A
The Simons are hired to find Abby's friend's old flame so the woman can see him again before her wedding.
