= An Accidental Cowboy =

2003 memoir by Jameson Parker

- Author: Jameson Parker
- Language: English
- Published: 2003 (Thomas Dunne Books)
- Publication place: United States
- Pages: 278
- ISBN: 0-312-31024-2
- OCLC: 52429557

An Accidental Cowboy is a memoir by Jameson Parker. It tells the story of the former Simon and Simon actor's physical recovery and psychological healing on a California ranch.

After being shot by a neighbor in 1992, Parker and his wife Darlene moved to the California hills to run a horse and cattle ranch. The book is notable for focusing more on life changes stemming from his tragedy than from the shooting itself, describing the Hollywood actor's transition to competent cowboy.

== Editions ==
- An Accidental Cowboy, Thomas Dunne Books, ISBN 0-312-31024-2
