= Jameson Parker =

American actor (born 1947)

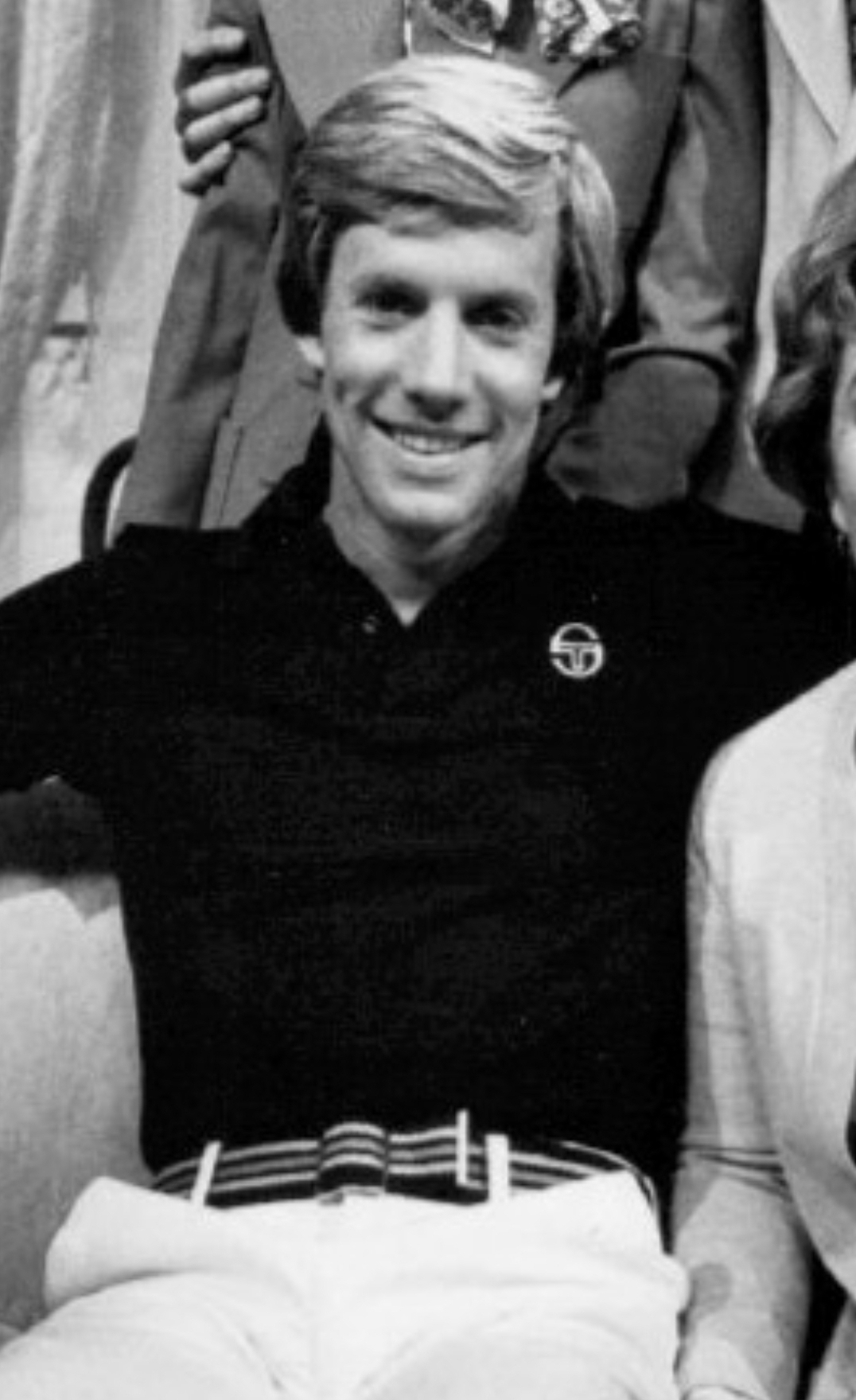
- Parker in One Life to Live (1977)
- Born: Francis Jameson Parker Jr. November 18, 1947 (age 78); Baltimore, Maryland, U.S.
- Occupation: Actor
- Years active: 1966–2009
- Spouses: Anne Taylor Davis (m. 1969; div. 1974) Bonnie Dottley (m. 1976–1992) Darleen Carr (m. 1992)
- Children: 4

Francis Jameson Parker Jr. (born November 18, 1947) is an American actor, best known for his roles as the first Brad Vernon in the soap opera One Life to Live, and as A.J. Simon on the 1980s television series Simon & Simon.

== Early life and education ==
Jameson Parker Jr. was born in Baltimore, Maryland, on November 18, 1947. He is the son of Jameson and Sydney Buchanan (née Sullivan) Parker. His father had been general legal counsel for the Parker family steel mill, an investment analyst, and government attorney (working first with the Maryland Public Expenditure Council and later with the United States Naval Reserve). In 1947, he was in private practice, but about to embark on a career as a diplomat with the United States Department of State.

His mother was the daughter of Mark Sullivan Sr., a former editor of Collier's and later columnist with the New York Herald Tribune newspaper. She was a short story author (under a pen name), and a reporter for The Washington Post. His parents eloped on June 8, 1933, and married in Rockville, Maryland.

Jameson Parker Sr. died in 1972. His widow married her husband's Harvard Law School friend, Lewis Metcalfe Walling, a former New Deal labor attorney, in 1974.

Jameson Jr. attended St. Albans School, Washington, D.C., and a Swiss prep school. He studied drama at Beloit College in Wisconsin.

== Acting career ==
At Beloit College, he acted in student theater productions, and, while living in Washington, D.C., he landed a job with a production of The Great White Hope at the Arena Stage and then acted in theatrical productions of Caligula and Indians. After completing his degree at Beloit College in 1971, he performed in dinner theater and summer stock in the Washington, D.C., area.

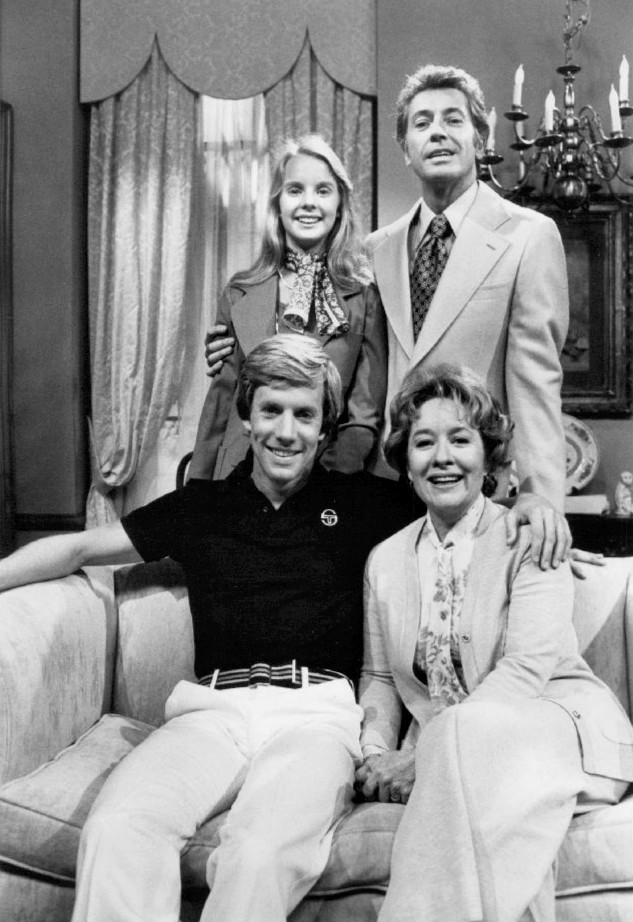
Cast of One Life to Live (1977). Front, L–R: Jameson Parker and Teri Keane. Back: Julia Montgomery and Farley Granger

In 1972, he moved to New York City, where he secured several television commercials and appeared in off-Broadway plays. He was cast as Dale Robinson in the daytime drama Somerset and created the role of Brad Vernon on One Life to Live. During this period, Parker guest-starred on the ABC series Family and Hart to Hart.

Parker made his motion picture debut in The Bell Jar (1979) and starred in A Small Circle of Friends (1980), in which he played one of three radical college students during the 1960s. The United Artists film received a limited theatrical release and grossed under $1 million. Another film from early in his acting career was the controversial White Dog (1982).

In addition, he played the leads in several CBS television movies: Women at West Point (1979), Anatomy of a Seduction (1979), The Gathering II (1979), The Promise of Love (1980), Callie and Son (1981), and A Caribbean Mystery (1983).

He became well known by co-starring as A.J. Simon in Simon & Simon from 1981 to 1989. Thanks to the hit show's popularity, in 1985, Beloit awarded him its Distinguished Service Citation. With his Simon & Simon co-star Gerald McRaney he appeared in the theatrical movie Jackals, which Parker co-produced. After completing this movie, he returned to Beloit College to star in a live summer stock theatrical production as Brick in Cat on a Hot Tin Roof. In 1987, starred alongside Donald Pleasence in John Carpenter's horror movie Prince of Darkness.

Parker guest-starred on the CBS series Walker, Texas Ranger as a corrupt cop. He appeared in the television movies Who Is Julia? (1986), Dead Before Dawn (1993), and Violation of Trust (1991). He guest starred on the sitcom Major Dad with his Simon & Simon co-star Gerald McRaney.

Parker's last known acting work was in 2003–2004, after a four-year hiatus, when he appeared in four episodes of JAG. In 2003, he co-hosted the show A Dog's Life with wife Darleen on the Outdoor Life Network (OLN). In 2009, Parker did voice-over work as the narrator for the documentary Endangered Species: California Fish and Game Wardens. He became a freelance writer for a variety of hard-copy and on-line magazines and wrote several books, among them the biography An Accidental Cowboy about his life after acting.

== Writing career ==
Parker has written five books:

- Parker, Jameson (2003). An Accidental Cowboy. ebook. ISBN 978-0984981236. recounts his life after Simon & Simon
- Parker, Jameson (2003). To Absent Friends: A Collection of Stories of the Dogs We Miss. Minocqua, WI: Willow Creek Press. ISBN 978-1572237063.
- Parker, Jameson (2012). American Riff. ebook. ISBN 978-0984981298.
- Parker, Jameson (2012). The Horseman at Midnight. ebook. ISBN 978-0984981267.
- Parker, Jameson (2016). Dancing with the Dead. BearManor Media. ISBN 978-1593939946.

== Personal life ==
Parker has been married three times. On July 19, 1969, he married Anne Taylor Davis in Fairfax County, Virginia, with whom he has one daughter. The two divorced on August 7, 1975, in Alexandria, Virginia. In 1976, Parker married Bonnie Dottley in New York City; the couple have three children. They divorced in 1992. He married Darleen Carr on June 18, 1992.

On October 1, 1992, Parker was shot in the left armpit and right arm by a neighbor during a verbal altercation concerning dog waste. He made a full recovery, and the neighbor was convicted of attempted murder and sentenced to nine years in prison.

== Filmography ==
| Year | Title | Role | Notes |
|---|---|---|---|
| 1975 | Crossfire | | TV movie |
| 1975–76 | Somerset | Dale Robinson | Daytime serial |
| 1976–78 | One Life to Live | Brad Vernon | Daytime serial |
| 1976 | Once an Eagle | | TV miniseries |
| 1977 | 79 Park Avenue | | TV miniseries |
| 1978 | The Immigrants | | TV movie |
| 1979 | Women at West Point | J.J. Palfrey | TV movie |
| 1979 | The Bell Jar | Buddy Willars | |
| 1979 | Anatomy of a Seduction | Ed Taggert | TV movie |
| 1979 | The Gathering, Part II | Bud | TV movie |
| 1980 | Family | Jack | Episode: "Jack of Hearts" |
| 1980 | Hart to Hart | Whitney Rogers | Episode: "A Question of Innocence" |
| 1980 | A Small Circle of Friends | Nick Baxter | |
| 1980 | The Promise of Love | Sam Daniels | TV movie |
| 1981 | Callie & Son | Randy Bordeaux | TV movie |
| 1981–89 | Simon & Simon | A.J. Simon | 156 episodes |
| 1982 | Bret Maverick | Whitney Delaworth III | Episodes: "Faith, Hope and Clarity" (Parts 1 & 2) |
| 1982 | White Dog | Roland Grale | |
| 1982 | Magnum, P.I. | A.J. Simon | Episode: "Ki'is Don't Lie" |
| 1983 | A Caribbean Mystery | Tim Kendall | TV movie |
| 1983 | Whiz Kids | A.J. Simon | Episode: "Deadly Access" |
| 1986 | Jackals | Dave Buchanon | |
| 1986 | Who Is Julia? | Don North | TV movie |
| 1987 | Prince of Darkness | Brian Marsh | |
| 1989 | Spy | Frank Harvey | TV movie |
| 1990 | Waiting for the Wind | David | Short |
| 1991 | Major Dad | Evan Charters | Episode: "Polly's Choice" |
| 1991 | She Says She's Innocent | Eric Reilly | TV movie |
| 1991 | Curse of the Crystal Eye | Luke Ward | |
| 1991 | Murder, She Wrote | Gordon Forbes | Episode: "The Skinny According to Nick Cullhane" |
| 1991 | Murder, She Wrote | Dane Kenderson | Episode: "Terminal Connection" |
| 1991 | Pros and Cons | Jace Novak | Episode: "May the Best Man Win" |
| 1992–93 | The Legend of Prince Valiant | Sir Kay (voice) | 5 episodes |
| 1993 | Dead Before Dawn | Robert Edelman | TV movie |
| 1994 | Burke's Law | Ben Hutchins | Episode: "Who Killed Nick Hazard?" |
| 1995 | Simon & Simon: In Trouble Again | A.J. Simon | TV movie |
| 1995 | ABC Afterschool Special | John Atkins | Episode: "Long Road Home" |
| 1996 | Have You Seen My Son | Mike Pritcher | TV movie |
| 1996 | Dead Man's Island | Lyle Stedman | TV movie |
| 1996 | Walker, Texas Ranger | Sgt. Bob Horne | Episode: "The Brotherhood" |
| 1997 | Something Borrowed, Something Blue | Richard Ives | TV movie |
| 1997 | Promised Land | Dr. Smith | Episode: "Take Back the Night" |
| 1998 | The Secret of NIMH 2: Timmy to the Rescue | Troy (voice) | Direct-to-video |
| 2003–04 | JAG | Harrison Kershaw | 4 episodes |
| 2009 | Endangered Species: California Fish and Game Wardens | Narrator (voice) | Documentary |
