= The Promise of Love =

- Print advertisement
- Genre: Drama; Romance
- Written by: Harry Longstreet; Renee Longstreet; Carol Saraceno
- Directed by: Don Taylor
- Starring: Valerie Bertinelli; Shelley Long; Craig T. Nelson
- Music by: Paul Chihara
- Country of origin: United States
- Original language: English

Production
- Executive producer: Pierre Cossette
- Producer: Jay Benson
- Production locations: Marine Corps Base Camp Pendleton, California
- Cinematography: Donald H. Birnkrant
- Editor: Anthony DiMarco
- Running time: 96 minutes
- Production company: Pierre Cossette Enterprises

Original release
- Network: CBS
- Release: November 11, 1980

The Promise of Love is a 1980 American made-for-television romantic drama film directed by Don Taylor. The film was originally titled Personal Effects.

== Plot ==
Starting in 1967 Oceanside, Kathy Emilio is a high school senior who, soon after graduation, marries her sweetheart, a Marine named Chuck Wakeman. Their lives as newlyweds is short-lived, as he is ordered to serve in Vietnam. During his absence, she spends her time at the local recreation center and befriends her neighbor Lorraine Simpson, whose husband is also away to fight in the war. When Kathy is informed that her husband has been killed, she is devastated and loses all lust for life. Her parents notice that she is unable to deal with his death and she joins a war widow support program. Her parents want her to move back to their house, but she refuses to.

At the urging of her family and friends, Kathy tries to adjust to normal life again, but she has trouble hiding the fact that she still feels lost. She is ordered to leave the apartment she lived in with her late husband, because they are meant for Marine Corps families only. She reluctantly packs to leave the only place that reminds her of Chuck and seeks refuge at the local swimming pool. There, she is noticed by Sam Daniels, the owner of the recreation center who was just closing up. Knowing about her past, he assumes that she is trying to commit suicide, despite her claims that she wasn't. Sympathizing with her, he offers Kathy a job as a swimming instructor. Although it doesn't pay well, she accepts the job.

When she tells her parents, they react enthusiastically, until she reveals that she is moving in with Lorraine, thereby not returning home. At the pool, she impresses the staff and is promoted to being a life guard. She soon becomes happier and grows closer to Sam. One evening, they get drunk and kiss. This makes her feel guilty, thinking she is somehow cheating on Chuck, who has been dead for only four months. She contacts a psychologist, who helps her to move on with her life. Before spending the night with him, Kathy admits to Sam that she only feels happy when she is around him. The next morning, she realizes that she isn't ready for a relationship. and turns back to her parents. She apologizes to them for her behavior, but tells them that they can't feel sorry for her. In the end, she leaves town to attend college.

== Cast ==
- Valerie Bertinelli as Kathy Wakeman
- Shelley Long as Lorraine Simpson
- Craig T. Nelson as Major Landau
- Jameson Parker as Sam Daniels
- Andy Romano as John Emilio, Kathy's father
- Joanna Miles as Toni Emilio, Kathy's mother
- David James Carroll as Chuck Wakeman
- Lauri Hendler as Laurie Emilio, Kathy’s sister
- Virginia Kiser as Beverly
- Karlene Crockett as Tracy
- Dey Young as Jennifer
