= Paul Chihara =

American composer (born 1938)

- Born: Paul Seiko Chihara; July 9, 1938 (age 88); Seattle, Washington, U.S.
- Education: University of Washington (B.A.); Cornell University (M.A., D.M.A.)
- Musical career
- Genres: Contemporary classical; film score
- Occupations: Composer, arranger, conductor, musical director

Paul Seiko Chihara (born July 9, 1938) is an American composer, arranger, and academic.

He was the first composer-in-residence of the Los Angeles Chamber Orchestra, and the Composer-in-Residence with the San Francisco Ballet for a decade. He founded and headed the Visual Media Program at the University of California, Los Angeles, and is an Artist Faculty at New York University.

Chihara's body of work includes ballets, film and television scores, symphonies, musicals, choral and chamber music. He has received two Primetime Emmy Award nominations for his television work.

== Early life and education ==
Chihara was born in Seattle, Washington in 1938. A Japanese American, he spent three years of his childhood with his family in an internment camp in Minidoka, Idaho due to Executive Order 9066.

Chihara received a BA and an MA in English literature from the University of Washington and Cornell University, respectively. He received a Doctorate in Musical Arts in 1965 from Cornell, studying with Robert Palmer. He also studied composition with Nadia Boulanger in Paris, Ernst Pepping in West Berlin, and Gunther Schuller in Tanglewood.

== Career ==
Chihara's prize-winning concert works, which include symphonies, concertos, chamber music, choral compositions, and ballets, have been performed to great acclaim both nationally and internationally. His works are concerned with the evolution and expression of highly contrasting colors, textures, and emotional levels, which are often dramatically juxtaposed with one another. His music reflects interest in a variety of musical styles, and often shows influence from Asian music and culture. He sometimes incorporates quotations and stylistic borrowings from jazz standards, folk songs, and the classical repertoire.

He was the first composer-in-residence of the Los Angeles Chamber Orchestra, conducted by Neville Marriner, from 1971 to 1974. He was also the Composer-in-Residence with the San Francisco Ballet from 1973 to 1986, The Tempest (the first full-length American ballet) and Shinju are among his well-known ballet scores.

Chihara's works have been commissioned by the Guggenheim Foundation, the Roger Wagner Chorale, the Naumberg Foundation, and the National Endowment for the Arts. He has also received commissions from the Boston Symphony Orchestra and the London Symphony, as well as the Los Angeles Philharmonic and Cleveland Orchestra. With Toru Takemitsu, he was composer-in-residence of the Marlboro Music Festival in 1971.

=== Film and television scores ===
Chihara has written scores for some 90 film and television productions, beginning with 1975's Death Race 2000, and came at a point that he decided to leave academia to pursue a living as a composer. His exit from the university environment, and into film music also produced a change in his concert music. It was at this point that he moved away from the 12-tone and freely chromatic styles he had employed up to then, and embraced a more tonal style.

He has worked with directors Sidney Lumet, Louis Malle, Michael Ritchie, and Arthur Penn. His film credits include Sweet Revenge (1976), I Never Promised You a Rose Garden (1977), The Bad News Bears Go to Japan (1978), A Fire in the Sky (1978), Prince of the City (1981), The Legend of Walks Far Woman (1982), The Survivors (1983), Crackers (1984), Impulse (1984), The Morning After (1986), Forever, Lulu (1987), The Killing Time (1987), Crossing Delancey (1988), and Penn & Teller Get Killed (1989). His television credits include The Dark Secret of Harvest Home, Dr. Strange, Brave New World, Noble House, Frederick Forsyth Presents (1989), and the pilot and theme music to Manimal, among others.

Chihara has been nominated for two Primetime Emmy Awards during his career: Outstanding Music Composition for a Limited Series, Movie or Special for San Francisco Ballet: The Tempest (aired on Great Performances) and Outstanding Music Direction for Live from Lincoln Center.

He was an arranger of the Broadway revue Sophisticated Ladies, based on the music of Duke Ellington. It won two Tony Awards (out of eight nominations, including for Best Musical). Chihara also composed the score for Shōgun: The Musical, based on James Clavell's novel. Shōgun had a short run on Broadway, from November 1990 to January 1991.

=== Academia ===
Chihara was an associate professor at UCLA from 1966 through 1971. He also had posts at the California Institute of Technology and the California Institute of the Arts during the 70s. He rejoined the faculty of UCLA's newly-formed Herb Alpert School of Music in 2009, where he founded and headed the Visual Media Program until 2015. As of 2026, Chihara is on the faculty of New York University as an Artist Faculty in Film Music.

His notable students include James Horner, Sean Friar, Joseph Trapanese, and Cynthia Tse Kimberlin.

== Partial list of works ==
- Concerto for viola and orchestra (1963)
- Magnificat (1965)
- Logs (double bass) (1966)
- Driftwood (string quartet) (1967)
- Branches (2 bassoons & percussion) (1968)
- Redwood for viola and percussion (1968)
- Prelude and Motet (Veni Domine) (organ) (1968)
- Willow Willow (flute, tuba & percussion) (1968)
- Forest Music (orchestra) (1970)
- Windsong (cello & orchestra) (1971)
- Ave Maria - Scarborough Fair (6 male voices) (1971)
- Ceremony I (oboe, 2 celli, double bass & percussion) (1972)
- Grass (double bass & orchestra) (1972)
- Ceremony III (flute & orchestra) (1973)
- Ceremony IV (orchestra) (1973)
- Ceremony II (amplified flute, 2 amplified celli & percussion) (1974)
- Elegy (piano trio) (1974)
- Piano Trio (1974)
- Guitar Concerto (1975)
- Symphony no.1 "Symphony in Celebration" (Ceremony V) (1975)
- Shinju (Lovers’ Suicide) (ballet after Chikamatsu) (1975)
- Missa Carminum (8 voices) (1975)
- The Beauty of the Rose is in its Passing (bassoon, 2 horns, harp, & percussion) (1976)
- String Quartet (Primavera) (1977)
- Mistletoe Bride (1978)
- The Infernal Machine revised as Oedipus Rag (musical after Jean Cocteau) (1978–80)
- The Tempest (ballet, after Shakespeare) (1980)
- Concerto for String Quartet & Orchestra ("Kisses Sweeter than Wine") (1980)
- Sinfonia concertante (9 instruments) (1980)
- Saxophone Concerto (1981)
- Symphony no.2 "Birds of Sorrow" (1981)
- Sequoia (string quartet & tape) (1984)
- Clarinet Trio (Shogun Trio) (1989)
- Duo Concertante for violin and viola (1989)
- Sonata "De Profundis" for viola and piano (1994, 2009)
- Forever Escher (saxophone quartet & string quartet) (1995)
- Minidoka (Reminiscences of ...) (ensemble & tape) (1996)
- Minidoka (chorus, percussion & tape) (1998)
- Double Concerto for Violin, Clarinet & Orchestra (1999)
- Clouds (orchestra) (2001)
- Songs of Love and Loss for solo viola and choir (2001)
- Amatsu Kaze (soprano and five instruments) (2002)
- An Afternoon on the Perfume River (chamber orchestra) (2004)
- Trio Nostalgico (2004)
- Magnificat: Hannah's Prayer (2007)
- Fantasy (violin/flute, cello & piano) (2008)
- Ami (piano, 4 hands) (2008)
- When Soft Voices Die (viola & orchestra) (2008)
- Images (clarinet, viola & piano) (2009)
- Second Piano Quintet, "Aka Tombo (Dragonfly)" (2009)
- Trouble in Tahiti (Suite) (2012), adaptation of Trouble in Tahiti, opera by Leonard Bernstein
- Ave Maria/Scarborough Fair (double chorus and solo oboe) (2015) - Commissioned by the Los Angeles Master Chorale, Grant Gershon, Music Director

=== Film and television scores ===
- Death Race 2000 (1975)
- Sweet Revenge (1976)
- Farewell to Manzanar (1976)
- I Never Promised You a Rose Garden (1977)
- The Bad News Bears Go to Japan (1978)
- The Dark Secret of Harvest Home (1978)
- Betrayal (1978)
- Dr. Strange (1978)
- A Fire in the Sky (1978)
- Brave New World (1980)
- The Legend of Walks Far Woman (1980)
- The Promise of Love (1980)
- Prince of the City (1981)
- Divorce Wars: A Love Story (1982)
- Miss All-American Beauty (1982)
- The Survivors (1983)
- Manimal (1983, main theme and pilot episode)
- Whiz Kids (1983-84, main theme and 12 episodes)
- Impulse (1984)
- Crackers (1984)
- Legmen (1984, pilot episode)
- Victims for Victims: The Theresa Saldana Story (1984)
- MacGruder and Loud (1985, main theme and pilot episode)
- The Bad Seed (1985)
- Cover Up (1985, 1 episode)
- A Bunny's Tale (1985)
- Right to Kill? (1985)
- ABC Weekend Special (1985, 1 episode)
- Toughlove (1985)
- American Playhouse (1985-87, 3 episodes)
- The Last Days of Frank and Jesse James (1986)
- American Justice (1986)
- When the Bough Breaks (1986)
- The Morning After (1986)
- Forever, Lulu (1987)
- The Killing Time (1987)
- Crossing Delancey (1988)
- China Beach (1988-91, 54 episodes)
- Noble House (1988)
- Shooter (1988)
- Killer Instinct (1988)
- Bridesmaids (1989)
- Gideon Oliver (1989, 1 episode)
- Penn & Teller Get Killed (1989)
- Kiki's Delivery Service (1989) - Additional music for 1998 English dub
- Dark Holiday (1989)
- Frederick Forsyth Presents (1989-90, 3 episodes)
- Family of Spies (1990)
- Rock Hudson (1990)
- Quicksand: No Escape (1992)
- Baby Snatcher (1992)
- 100 Centre Street (2001, 2 episodes)
- American Family (2002, 1 episode)
- Strip Search (2004)
- Romance & Cigarettes (2005)

=== Musicals ===
- Sophisticated Ladies (1981) - Arranger and music consultant
- Shogun: The Musical (1990)
