= Dead Before Dawn (1993 film) =

- Genre: Drama; Thriller
- Written by: Ricky Blackwood; John Ireland
- Directed by: Charles Correll
- Starring: Cheryl Ladd; Jameson Parker
- Music by: Sylvester Levay
- Country of origin: United States
- Original language: English

Production
- Executive producers: Joel Fields; Ronald H. Gilbert; Leonard Hill
- Producers: Bernadette Caulfield; Ardythe Goergens
- Cinematography: Jerry G. Callaway
- Editor: Mark W. Rosenbaum
- Running time: 97 minutes
- Production companies: Joel Fields Productions; Leonard Hill Films

Original release
- Network: ABC
- Release: January 10, 1993

Dead Before Dawn is a 1993 television film produced and directed by Charles Correll. The film is based on a true event involving the publicized mid-1980s bitter divorce of Linda and Robert Edelman.

== Plot ==
In 1983, Linda Edelman is married to a wealthy and successful Dallas real estate developer Robert. Living in a beautiful home with two children, the couple seems to have it all. Unbeknownst to many, however, is that Linda is physically abused by her husband. One day, she decides she has had enough, packs her stuff and moves back in with her parents John and Virginia. Advised by her lawyer, Linda leaves the children behind in the family's home, reasoning that this way their lives will not be drastically changed. Her parents are upset with this decision, and assign her to a well-established lawyer, Ike Vanden Eykel.

In order to acquire full custody, and to prevent a court case from being pursued, Robert hires a private investigator James Young, and offers him a large sum of money to kill her. A mutual friend, Fred Zabitowski brings Young in contact with the assassin, Zack. After Zack tracks her in the mall and on the highway, Linda starts to notice that she is being followed and rushes to Vanden Eykel's office for help. There, Zack reveals himself as an FBI agent in disguise. The FBI informs Linda that while they have enough evidence to put Young behind bars, they need more evidence to catch Robert. FBI agent Masterson specifically wants to wait until Robert makes the payment for the hit.

Zack tries to stall the murder as long as possible, in order for the FBI to collect as much evidence as possible, but soon Young and Robert grow impatient. Therefore, the FBI decides to stage her murder, taking all her valuable belongings as 'proof', while hiding Linda in a cabin by the lake. Robert, however, grows suspicious when her body does not show up, and stalls the payment. After the FBI informs him of Linda's 'disappearance', Robert starts to take procedures to legally keep his children. This upsets Linda, who considers going back to Dallas to stop Robert, but Zack convinces her to keep low for at least one more day. After Young makes the payment to Zack, he and Robert are arrested for conspiracy to commit attempted murder, and sentenced to 10 years in jail until Robert is released in 1993.

== Cast ==
- Cheryl Ladd as Linda DeSilva Edelman
- Jameson Parker as Robert Edelman
- G. W. Bailey as Masterson
- Kim Coates as Zack Bell
- Matt Clark as John DeSilva
- Keone Young as James Young
- Stanley Anderson as Ike Vanden Eykel
- Hope Lange as Virginia DeSilva
- Jensen Daggett as Dana Shoreham
- Hollis McCarthy as Miriam DeSilva
- Debra Bluford as Terri Beaumont
- Ken Boehr as Fred Zabitosky
- Kip Niven as Ken Fuller
- Andrew Gilchrist as Stephen Edelman
- Kimberly Horner as Kathleen Edelman
