= Brad Vernon =

- One Life to Live character
- Steve Fletcher as Brad Vernon
- Portrayed by: Jameson Parker (1976–78); Steve Fletcher (1978–86)
- Duration: 1976–1986
- First appearance: June 1976
- Last appearance: December 12, 1986
- Created by: Gordon Russell
- Introduced by: Doris Quinlan
In-universe information
- Occupation: Vernon Inn owner; Tennis player
- Parents: Will Vernon; Naomi Vernon
- Sisters: Samantha Vernon
- Spouse: Jenny Wolek (1978–81); Connie O'Neill (1986–88)
- Daughters: Kristine Karr; Mary Vernon (stillborn)
- Nieces and nephews: Sammi Garretson

Brad Vernon is a fictional character from the American soap opera One Life to Live.

== Creation ==
=== Casting ===
Actor Jameson Parker was cast on-the-spot by OLTL executive producer Doris Quinlan for the role of Brad following an encounter in a New York City elevator. Parker originated the role onscreen in June 1976 and played it through 1978. Actor Steve Fletcher assumed the role regularly from July 1978 through September 1986. Ted LePlat temporarily substituted in the role in the early months of 1980 when Fletcher took ill.

=== Characterization ===
Nicknamed "The Cad", Brad is an ambivalent, abusive philanderer. Soap opera critics describe the character as a villainous antihero who appealed to viewer empathy by possessing redeeming qualities.

== Storyline ==
=== 1976–81 ===
Jenny (Glass) and Brad (Parker), 1977

Brad (Parker) is introduced onscreen as a promising twentysomething tennis player in June 1976, but a knee injury soon cuts his pro-athlete dreams short. Bitter and self-pitying, Brad becomes a womanizing Lothario to fill his time. He romances several young women concurrently, including his father's secretary Jenny Wolek (Katherine Glass). Jenny resists his advances, eventually falling for him until uncovering his affair with waitress Lana McClain (Jacklyn Zeman), which resulted in Lana becoming pregnant.

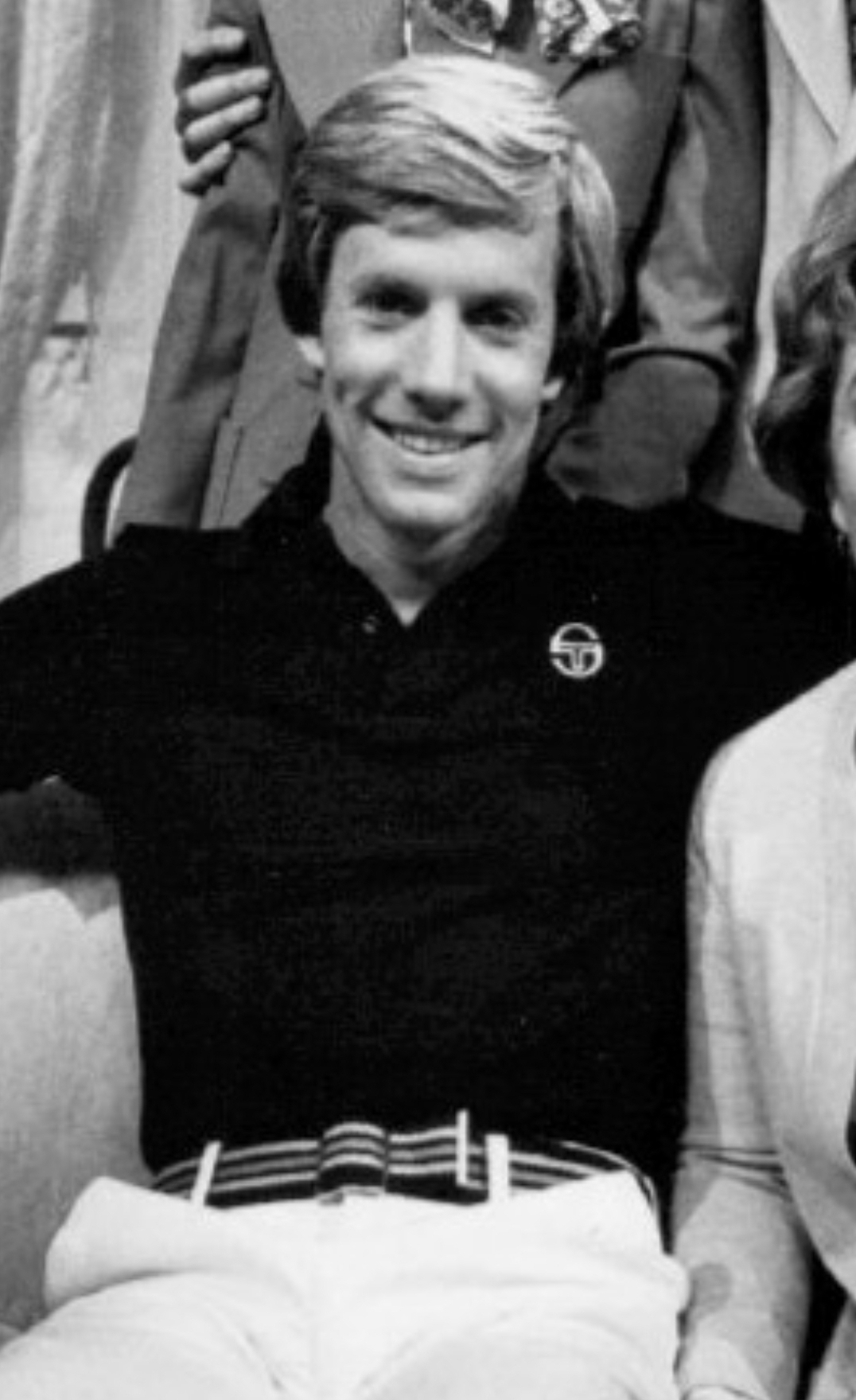
Jameson Parker as Brad Vernon in One Life to Live (1977)

One night during their romantic escapades, Brad gives a drunk Lana a glass of milk laced with sleeping pills, and she dies. Fearful he might be blamed for murdering her, Brad coaxes Jenny into providing him an alibi, but the police do not accept it. Brad and Jenny were married on January 3, 1978, preventing her from testifying against Brad in court. Nevertheless, Brad goes to jail for manslaughter. When Jenny realizes she was used, she begins divorce proceedings. Brad (Fletcher onward) becomes distraught over learning his sister Sam (Julia Montgomery) suffered a serious accident, and Jenny puts their annulment on hold to console him.

Jenny (Brynn Thayer onward) decides to continue with their marriage upon Brad's release from jail in October 1978, discovering herself pregnant by him months later in May. Brad soon rapes Jenny's sister Karen Wolek (Judith Light) and pressures Karen into secrecy by telling her any upsetting news would cause Jenny to miscarry. Ironically, with stress of Brad's constant womanizing exacerbated by finding out he raped her sister, Jenny blacks out, goes into premature labor, and unknowingly miscarries their child, Mary Vernon.

Stillborn Mary is soon switched in 1979 in a scheme by Karen and con man ex-boyfriend Marco Dane (Gerald Anthony) with the live-born child of Karen's fellow ex-prostitute and friend Katrina Karr (Nancy Snyder), Kristine Karr. Jenny and Brad's divorce is finalized in April 1981, and in a heartwrenching move, Jenny's "Mary", born Kristine Karr, is eventually returned to Katrina after she raises the child for over two years.

=== 1981–1988 ===
After Jenny divorces him, Brad soon engages in a brief romance with auto mechanic Georgina Whitman (Ilene Kristen). When Jenny plans to marry Dr. Peter Janssen (Denny Albee), a jealous Brad objects to the marriage, as he pined after ex-wife Jenny again. Jenny rebuffs his advances. She goes ahead with the marriage in 1981, but is widowed for a second time in 1982. Brad comforts her, proposing marriage to both Katrina and later Jenny, both of which never come to fruition. Brad soon opens and runs the eponymous Vernon Inn hotel for several years, marrying Connie O'Neill (Terry Donahue) and leaving Llanview in September 1986.

Upon returning to Llanview in 1988 for the funeral of her sister Didi, Connie (Elizabeth Keifer) and Brad tell Delilah and Rafe of their lives in France.

== Reception ==
The introduction of Jameson Parker was met with fanfare by fans enamored with the actor's good looks and easygoing portrayal. When Brad physically abused Jenny (Glass) onscreen in 1978, a group of angry viewers left a note at the OLTL New York City studios threatening violence if Parker did not "leave Jenny alone".

The onscreen October 1979 rape storyline of ex-hooker Karen (Light) by brother-in-law Brad (Fletcher) was highly controversial, garnering acclaim and criticism for OLTL and ABC Daytime for the frank nature of the story arc and moral implications of the sexual assault of a former prostitute.
