= The Legend of Walks Far Woman =

- Genre: Drama; Western
- Based on: Walks Far Woman by Colin Stuart
- Written by: Evan Hunter
- Directed by: Mel Damski
- Starring: Raquel Welch; Bradford Dillman
- Music by: Paul Chihara
- Country of origin: United States
- Original language: English

Production
- Executive producers: Tony Converse; Roger Gimbel
- Producers: William S. Gilmore; Lee Levinson
- Production locations: Billings, Montana; Hardin, Montana; Red Lodge, Montana
- Cinematography: Gayne Rescher
- Editor: David Finfer
- Running time: 111 minutes
- Production companies: EMI Television Programs; Lee Levinson Productions; Raquel Welch Productions; Roger Gimbel Productions

Original release
- Network: NBC
- Release: May 30, 1982

The Legend of Walks Far Woman is a 1982 American television film starring Raquel Welch and Bradford Dillman. It aired on NBC.

== Plot ==
An Indian woman kills her husband after he is violent towards her. She is banished from her tribe.

== Cast ==
- Raquel Welch as Walks Far Woman
- Bradford Dillman as Singer
- George Clutesi as Old Grandfather
- Nick Mancuso as Horses Ghost
- Eloy Casados
- Frank Salsedo as Many Scalps
- Hortensia Colorado as Red Hoop Woman
- Nick Ramus as Left Hand Bull
- Alex Kubik as Elk Hollering
- Branscombe Richmond as Big Lake

== Production ==
The film was announced in June 1979 and filming took place later that year. It was made by Raquel Welch's own production company. There were reportedly a number of clashes involving Raquel Welch and the director on set.

Welch admitted the role represented "a change of pace" for her.

== Reception ==
The film aired in the UK in 1980. It was not screened in the US until 1982 because some NBC executives thought it was "a disaster". Brandon Tartikoff of NBC cut 25 minutes from the film before it aired.

The New York Times said "there is nothing dreadfully wrong with Miss Welch's performance... it's just that the entire story is boring."

It was the highest-rated TV movie of the year.
