= Night of Bloody Horror =

- Theatrical poster
- Directed by: Joy N. Houck Jr.
- Written by: Joy N. Houck Jr. Robert A. Weaver
- Produced by: Joy N. Houck Jr.
- Starring: Gerald McRaney
- Cinematography: Robert A. Weaver
- Edited by: Robert A. Weaver
- Production companies: Cinema IV; Taste of Blood Inc.
- Distributed by: Howco Productions Inc.
- Release date: August 9, 1969 (New Orleans)
- Running time: 89 minutes
- Country: United States
- Language: English

Night of Bloody Horror is a 1969 American horror film directed by Joy N. Houck Jr. and starring Gerald McRaney in his feature film debut.

== Plot ==
Wesley Stuart, a mentally fragile youth who lives with his domineering mother, has recently been released from an asylum, where he spent 13 years for accidentally shooting and killing his brother. Plagued by headaches and sudden blackouts, he becomes the chief suspect when some of his recent acquaintances, including his girlfriend and a nurse, are violently murdered.

== Cast ==
- Gerald McRaney as Wesley Stuart
- Evelyn Hendricks as Agatha Stuart
- Gaye Yellen as Angelle Miliot
- Herbert Nelson as Dr. Bennett Moss
- Lisa Dameron as Susan Collins
- Charlotte White as Kay Jensen
- Michael Anthony as Mario Spanelli
- George Spelvin as Priest

== Production ==
The film was shot in New Orleans.

According to McRaney, he was cast by a “sometimes casting agent” who was the aunt of Al Salzer, one of the producers of the film.
