= A Small Circle of Friends =

1980 film by Rob Cohen

- Theatrical release poster
- Directed by: Rob Cohen
- Written by: Ezra Sacks
- Produced by: Tim Zinnemann
- Starring: Brad Davis; Karen Allen; Jameson Parker
- Cinematography: Michael Butler
- Edited by: Randy Roberts
- Music by: Jim Steinman
- Distributed by: United Artists
- Release date: March 12, 1980
- Running time: 113 minutes
- Country: United States
- Language: English
- Budget: $5-6 million
- Box office: $766,740

A Small Circle of Friends is a 1980 American drama film directed by Rob Cohen (in his directorial debut) and starring Brad Davis, Karen Allen and Jameson Parker. It was distributed by United Artists.

== Plot ==
In Boston, Nick Baxter (Jameson Parker) encounters Jessica Bloom (Karen Allen), prompting recollections of their college years. In 1967, Nick enters Harvard University and befriends aspiring journalist Leonardo "Leo" DaVinci Rizzo (Brad Davis). Leo becomes romantically involved with Jessica, an art student at Radcliffe College.

Amid opposition to the Vietnam War, the students celebrate President Lyndon B. Johnson's decision not to seek reelection. Leo's disregard for Jessica's artistic ambitions and jealousy of Nick strain their friendship. Jessica subsequently begins a relationship with Nick. When the 1969 draft lottery threatens Leo with military service, Nick fabricates medical records to secure his exemption, while Jessica creates a diversion.

In 1971, the three reconcile during a weekend away and share a sexual encounter. Leo later seeks to interview radical activist Haddox (John Friedrich) following a bank bombing. At Haddox's hideout, Leo attempts to dissuade him from further violence, but an accidental explosion kills everyone inside.

Returning to the present, Nick has become a psychiatrist and Jessica a divorced lawyer. After initially parting, Nick joins her taxi, and they agree to meet that evening.

== Cast ==
- Brad Davis as Leonardo DaVinci Rizzo
- Karen Allen as Jessica Bloom
- Jameson Parker as Nick Baxter
- Shelley Long as Alice
- John Friedrich as Alex Haddox
- Gary Springer as Greenblatt
- Craig Richard Nelson as Harry Norris
- Harry Caesar as Jimmy
- Nan Martin as Mrs. Baxter
- Daniel Stern as Crazy Kid

== Soundtrack ==
The soundtrack features instrumental music composed by Jim Steinman. Steinman later incorporated melodies from his score into the power ballad songs "Total Eclipse of the Heart", which became a number one hit for Bonnie Tyler in 1983, and "Making Love Out of Nothing at All", which simultaneously became a number two hit for Air Supply.

== Production ==
Some outdoor riot sequences were filmed some 37 miles (60 km) south of Harvard University's main campus in Cambridge, Massachusetts, at Bridgewater State University in Bridgewater, Massachusetts, after Harvard declined to allow the filming on their campus. Other scenes were filmed at MIT and other local colleges.
