= American Justice (film) =

- Theatrical release poster by Drew Struzan
- Directed by: Gary Grillo
- Written by: Dennis A. Pratt
- Produced by: Jack Lucarelli; Jameson Parker
- Starring: Jameson Parker; Gerald McRaney; Wilford Brimley
- Cinematography: Steve Yaconelli
- Edited by: Steve Mirkovich
- Music by: Paul Chihara
- Production company: Hunter/MFG Production
- Distributed by: The Movie Store
- Release date: September 19, 1986
- Running time: 97 minutes
- Country: United States
- Language: English

American Justice (also known as Jackals) is a 1986 American action crime drama film directed by Gary Grillo and starring Jameson Parker, Gerald McRaney and Wilford Brimley.

== Cast ==
- Jameson Parker as Dave Buchanon
- Jack Lucarelli as Joe Case
- Gerald McRaney as Jake Wheeler
- Wilford Brimley as Sheriff Mitchell
- Jeannie Wilson as Jess Buchanon
- Rosanna DeSoto as Manuela

== Reception ==
Leonard Maltin awarded the film two stars, calling it a "(p)redictable, forgettable action drama".
