= Major Dad =

1989–1993 American television series

- The cast of Major Dad.
- Genre: Sitcom
- Created by: John G. Stephens; Richard C. Okie
- Developed by: Earl Pomerantz
- Starring: Gerald McRaney; Shanna Reed; Beverly Archer; Jon Cypher; Nicole Dubuc; Chelsea Hertford; Matt Mulhern; Marisa Ryan
- Composers: Roger Steinman; Steve Dorff
- Country of origin: United States
- Original language: English
- No. of seasons: 4
- No. of episodes: 96 (list of episodes)

Production
- Executive producers: Rick Hawkins; Gerald McRaney; Richard C. Okie; Earl Pomerantz
- Producers: Jim Evering; Barry Gold; Janet Leahy; Liz Sage; Todd Stephens
- Editors: Skip Collector; John William Heath; Augie Hess
- Camera setup: 35mm Multi-camera
- Running time: 30 minutes
- Production companies: S.B.B. Productions; Spanish Trail Productions; Universal Television

Original release
- Network: CBS
- Release: September 17, 1989 – May 17, 1993

Major Dad is an American sitcom television series created by Richard C. Okie and John G. Stephens, developed by Earl Pomerantz, that originally ran from September 17, 1989, to May 17, 1993, on CBS, starring Gerald McRaney as Major John D. MacGillis and Shanna Reed as his wife Polly. The cast also includes Beverly Archer, Matt Mulhern, Jon Cypher, Marisa Ryan, Nicole Dubuc, and Chelsea Hertford.

== Synopsis ==
The first season is set at the fictional Camp Singleton (meant to represent Camp Pendleton), where hard-charging United States Marine Corps Major John D. MacGillis is commander of the infantry training school's acquisition division. MacGillis's life is changed when he falls in love with a liberal journalist, Polly Cooper. The show follows MacGillis in his work life, where he deals with Lt. Eugene Holowachuk (Matt Mulhern), Sgt. Byron James (Marlon Archey), and Merilee Gunderson (Whitney Kershaw), as well as his home life, as he learns to live with Polly's three daughters, Elizabeth, Robin, and Casey.

At the beginning of the second season, the MacGillis family moves to Camp Hollister (based on Marine Corps Base Quantico), where MacGillis must adapt to the role of staff secretary (or "staff weenie") and the crazy antics of Commanding (Brigadier) General Marcus C. Craig, Aide-de-Camp 1st Lt. Eugene Holowachuk (who transferred with Major MacGillis from Camp Singleton), and Gunnery Sgt. Alva "Gunny" Bricker, the General's secretary, a no-nonsense Marine, who despite her brusque nature and unprepossessing physical appearance, is the target of many enthusiastic (and unseen) suitors. Character development increased during the second season, such as the revelation that MacGillis is a former member of the United States Marine Corps Silent Drill Platoon.

Major Dad incorporated the 1991 Persian Gulf War into storylines, depicting MacGillis staying stateside instead of going to Saudi Arabia as he wanted. Scenes with Polly writing in her diary were shot as late as possible to incorporate breaking news. After rewriting the last six episodes of the 1990-1991 season because of the war, the show had to again modify episodes because the war ended sooner than expected.

== Cast ==
- Gerald McRaney as Maj. John D. MacGillis
- Shanna Reed as Pollyanna "Polly" Esther Cooper MacGillis
- Marisa Ryan as Elizabeth Cooper MacGillis
- Nicole Dubuc as Robin Cooper MacGillis
- Chelsea Hertford as Casey Cooper MacGillis
- Matt Mulhern as Lt. Eugene "Gene" Holowachuk
- Marlon Archey as Sgt. Byron James (season 1)
- Whitney Kershaw as Merilee Gunderson (season 1)
- Jon Cypher as Brig. Gen. Marcus C. Craig (seasons 2-4)
- Beverly Archer as GySgt. Alva "Gunny" Bricker (seasons 2-4)
- Timothy Schnabel as Billy Sparling (some episodes)

== Episode guide ==
Season	Episodes	Originally released		Rank	Rating
Season	Episodes	First released	Last released	Rank	Rating
1	26	September 17, 1989	May 21, 1990	39	13.2
2	24	September 17, 1990	May 13, 1991	21	14.9 (Tied with In the Heat of the Night)
3	24	September 16, 1991	May 11, 1992	9	16.8
4	22	September 25, 1992	May 17, 1993	69	9.8

== Scheduling ==
In its first three seasons, the show aired on Monday nights, where it attained solid ratings for most of its run, ultimately peaking at #9 in its third season. But for the fourth season, CBS moved Major Dad to Friday nights where ratings sagged, leading to its cancellation.

== Awards and nominations ==
Year	Award	Result	Category	Recipient
1992	BMI Film & TV Award	Won	BMI TV Music Award	Steve Dorff
1992	Emmy Award	Nominated	Outstanding Individual Achievement in Main Title Theme Music	Steve Dorff
1990	Young Artist Awards	Nominated	Best Young Actress Starring in a Television Series	Chelsea Hertford
1990	Young Artist Awards	Won	Best New Television Series	-
1991	Young Artist Awards	Nominated	Best Young Actress Starring in a Television Series	Marisa Ryan
1991	Young Artist Awards	Nominated	Best Young Actress Starring in a Television Series	Chelsea Hertford
1991	Young Artist Awards	Nominated	Best Young Actress Starring in a Television Series	Nicole Dubuc
1991	Young Artist Awards	Nominated	Best Young Actor Supporting or Re-Occurring Role for a TV Series	Chance Michael Corbitt
1992	Young Artist Awards	Nominated	Best Young Actress Starring in a Television Series	Marisa Ryan
1993	Young Artist Awards	Nominated	Outstanding Actress Under Ten in a Television Series	Chelsea Hertford
