= Simon & Simon =

American crime drama television series (1981–1988)

- Title screen from Season 1
- Genre: Mystery; Comedy-drama; Action
- Created by: Philip DeGuere
- Starring: Gerald McRaney; Jameson Parker; Mary Carver; Eddie Barth; Jeannie Wilson; Tim Reid; Joan McMurtrey
- Music by: Joseph Conlan
- Opening theme: Simon & Simon (instrumental version) by Barry De Vorzon; Michael Towers
- Ending theme: "Best of Friends" performed by The Thrasher Brothers
- Country of origin: United States
- Original language: English
- No. of seasons: 8
- No. of episodes: 156 (list of episodes)

Production
- Executive producers: Philip DeGuere; John G. Stephens; Richard Chapman
- Producers: Mark A. Burley; Richard Chapman; Mary Eagle; Bill Dial; George Geiger; Richard C. Okie
- Running time: 45–48 minutes
- Production company: Universal Television

Original release
- Network: CBS
- Release: November 24, 1981 – December 31, 1988

Simon & Simon is an American crime drama television series that originally ran from November 24, 1981, to December 31, 1988. The series was broadcast on CBS, and starred Gerald McRaney and Jameson Parker as dissimilar brothers who operate a two-man detective agency in San Diego, California.

== Premise ==
The show revolves around the decisively polar-opposite Simon brothers, Rick (McRaney) and Andrew Jackson/"A.J." (Parker). Together, the brothers run a private investigator agency in San Diego, California, during the 1980s. Their contrasting approaches to investigations and subsequent personality conflicts provide much of the drama and comedy in each week's episode. The brothers have genuine love for one another as well as intense loyalty and will go to great lengths to protect one another.

Rick is a United States Marine Corps Vietnam War veteran with an earthy, plain-speaking personality and a penchant for cowboy boots, denim, and pickup trucks. He lives on a boat in his brother A.J.'s yard. In contrast, A.J. is a college graduate with a polished, preppy look and a taste for classic cars. A.J. is a practicing Catholic while Rick is not, and though A.J. is a stickler for rules in life and at work, Rick is more of a free spirit with street smarts. Their odd couple style differences extend even to their cars, with Rick's Dodge Power Wagon used in one episode ("Love, Christy" (Season 1, Episode 2)) to crush the engine of a car contrasting with A.J.'s 1957 Chevrolet Bel Air convertible and customized Camaros (Chevrolet Camaro Z28 and 1968 Chevrolet Camaro RS) in the two-part episode, "Pirate's Key".

Although Rick is a few years older than A.J., McRaney and Parker were both born in 1947 and have only a three-month age difference.

== Cast ==
=== Main ===
- Gerald McRaney as Rick Simon
- Jameson Parker as A.J. Simon
- Mary Carver as Cecilia Simon, the brothers' mother
- Eddie Barth as Myron Fowler (seasons 1–2), A.J.'s ex-boss and their more successful competitor
- Jeannie Wilson as Janet Fowler (season 1–2, regular; seasons 3 and 6, guest), Myron's daughter. She works for her father, attends law school and helps the Simons from time to time, much to her father's annoyance. During season two, she works as an assistant D.A.
- Tim Reid as Lieutenant Marcel Proust "Downtown" Brown (seasons 3–6), the Simons' friend in the police department
- Joan McMurtrey as Lieutenant Abigail Marsh (seasons 7–8)

=== Recurring ===
- Daphne Reid as reporter Temple Hill (1983–1987)
- Scott Murphy as Police Officer Nixon (1984–1988)
- Donna Jepsen as Officer Susie Jepsen (1985–1989)
- Marlowe, Rick Simon's pet dog

== Episodes ==
Season	Episodes	Originally released	
Season	Episodes	First released	Last released
1	13	November 24, 1981	March 16, 1982
2	23	October 7, 1982	March 31, 1983
3	23	September 29, 1983	March 29, 1984
4	22	September 27, 1984	March 28, 1985
5	24	October 3, 1985	May 1, 1986
6	22	September 25, 1986	March 26, 1987
7	16	December 3, 1987	April 7, 1988
8	13	October 8, 1988	December 31, 1988

== Production ==
=== Development ===
The original 1980 television pilot, called Pirate's Key, was set in Florida. When CBS picked up the show, the characters' home was changed from Florida to San Diego, California, where the show was filmed for the first season. Due to the production costs and low ratings, filming and production moved to Los Angeles, although the show continued to be set in San Diego for the course of its eight-year run on CBS.

The series was created by executive producer Philip DeGuere, who credited his inspirations to a request from a CBS executive to create something like a modern "Butch and Sundance", and a spec pilot DeGuere had recently read about a divorced husband and wife detective team written by Bob Shayne, whom DeGuere hired to write during the first two seasons. Shayne continued to write episodes for the series during its run, and together, they went on to create the CBS series Whiz Kids.

=== Original run ===
Simon & Simon was almost canceled in 1982 due to low ratings. However, at DeGuere and Shayne's request, CBS decided to give the series another chance by moving it to Thursday nights at 9 p.m., following Magnum, P.I. The new season began with a two-hour crossover episode with a story that began on the already popular Magnum and continued on (the mostly unknown) Simon & Simon, in an attempt to carry Magnum's audience over to Simon & Simon. (see below) The effort worked, and the show's ratings quickly rose; it became a hit in that slot and continued to draw ratings for the next several seasons. The show's peak years in the ratings were seasons 2–4, where it landed at no. 7, no. 5 and no. 7, respectively. In September 1984, The Cosby Show premiered in the 8 p.m. time slot against Magnum and was an immediate ratings hit and also substantially increased the ratings of the following NBC comedy shows, such as Cheers airing at 9 p.m. against Simon & Simon. The show fell to 29th in the 85–86 season and never recovered.

Simon & Simon moved to Saturday nights late in its run, and the ratings dropped considerably. CBS only committed to a 13-episode season for the fall of 1988 but cancelled the series with two episodes left unaired, including the series finale, which eventually aired on September 9 and 16, 1989, as the show entered syndication.

=== Theme music ===
For the first season, the song "Best of Friends", composed by Linda Creed and Barry De Vorzon and performed by the Thrasher Brothers, served as the series' theme song. More specifically, the instrumental version of "Best of Friends" appeared at the beginning of each episode (and short clips of the instrumental version occasionally appeared within episodes, even after the first season), while the lyrical version appeared at the conclusion of each episode.

At the beginning of the second season, the second and more recognizable instrumental theme song, composed by Barry De Vorzon (who had previously composed the theme to the 1970s police drama, S.W.A.T.) and Michael Towers, was introduced. The theme consists primarily of an electric bottle-slide guitar lead with a saxophone interlude and remained until the last episode of the final season.

Both theme songs had extended versions released; the Thrasher Brothers in 1982, and De Vorzon/Towers's version in 1984.

=== Crossover with Magnum, P.I. ===
The episode "Emeralds Are Not a Girl's Best Friend" concludes a crossover that begins on the Magnum, P.I. episode "Ki'is Don't Lie", where Higgins helps the Simons track the woman with stolen Hawaiian artifacts to Latin America. For repeat and syndication purposes, a second conclusion was also shot, wherein the fleeing villain is caught, allowing the Magnum episode to be wrapped up and the episode to be rerun as a "stand alone" episode. Consequently, the Simon & Simon concluding hour, "Emeralds Are Not a Girl's Best Friend", did not appear in reruns for many years, nor did the original broadcast version of "Ki'Is Don't Lie". Both original versions have since been released on DVD.

Additionally, A.J. Simon appeared on the Whiz Kids episode "Deadly Access". In return, the Whiz Kids characters Richie Adler, Hamilton Parker, Jeremy Saldino, Alice Parker, and Irene Adler appeared on the Simon & Simon episode "Fly the Alibi Skies" the following night.

== Home media ==
On October 10, 2006, Universal Pictures Home Entertainment released the first season of Simon & Simon on DVD in Region 1. Due to poor sales, no subsequent seasons were immediately released, because of the synthesized background music scores, where it had entirely replaced the original music scores, due to music licensing issues.

In Fall 2008, Shout! Factory announced that they had acquired the distribution rights through an agreement with Universal Pictures Home Entertainment. They subsequently released seasons 2–8 on DVD, with seasons 5-8 originally released as Shout! exclusives.

Season 5 was re-released as a general retail release on May 9, 2017. Season 6 was re-released in general retail on September 19, 2017. Season 7 was re-released on November 14, 2017, Season 8 was re-released on December 12, 2017.

Mill Creek Entertainment released two "best-of" collections of Simon & Simon. On January 18, 2011, they released Simon & Simon – The Best of Season Two, while on July 19, 2011 they released Simon & Simon – The Best of Season Three.

In Region 4, Madman Entertainment released Season 1 on DVD in Australia on July 6, 2011.

DVD name	Ep #	Release date
Season 1	13	October 10, 2006
Season 2	23	February 10, 2009
Season 3	23	August 18, 2009
Season 4	22	April 6, 2010
Season 5	24	July 20, 2010♦ May 9, 2017 (re-release)
Season 6	22	February 21, 2012♦ September 19, 2017 (re-release)
Season 7	16	October 16, 2012♦ November 14, 2017 (re-release)
Season 8	13	January 15, 2013♦ December 12, 2017 (re-release)

♦- Shout! Factory Exclusives title, sold exclusively through Shout's online store

== Reunion movie and cultural references ==
=== Simon & Simon: In Trouble Again (1995) ===
In this reunion movie, which premiered on February 23, 1995 some years have passed, and a now-divorced A.J. (whose ex-wife is Janet Fowler from original series) works in Seattle as an attorney. Rick stops by to visit en route to delivering an expensive yacht. The trouble starts when the yacht, with Rick and A.J.'s mother Cecilia on board, is hijacked.

=== The Greatest Event in Television History (2012) ===
The Greatest Event in Television History premiered on Adult Swim, on October 12, 2012. Hosted by Jeff Probst, the program went behind the scenes during the making of a shot-for-shot remake of the Simon & Simon opening sequence with Adam Scott and Jon Hamm in the roles of A.J. and Rick, respectively. The special also featured the appearances of Paul Rudd, Gus van Sant, Megan Mullally, Paul Scheer, and Kathryn Hahn.
