= Gerald McRaney =

American actor (born 1947)

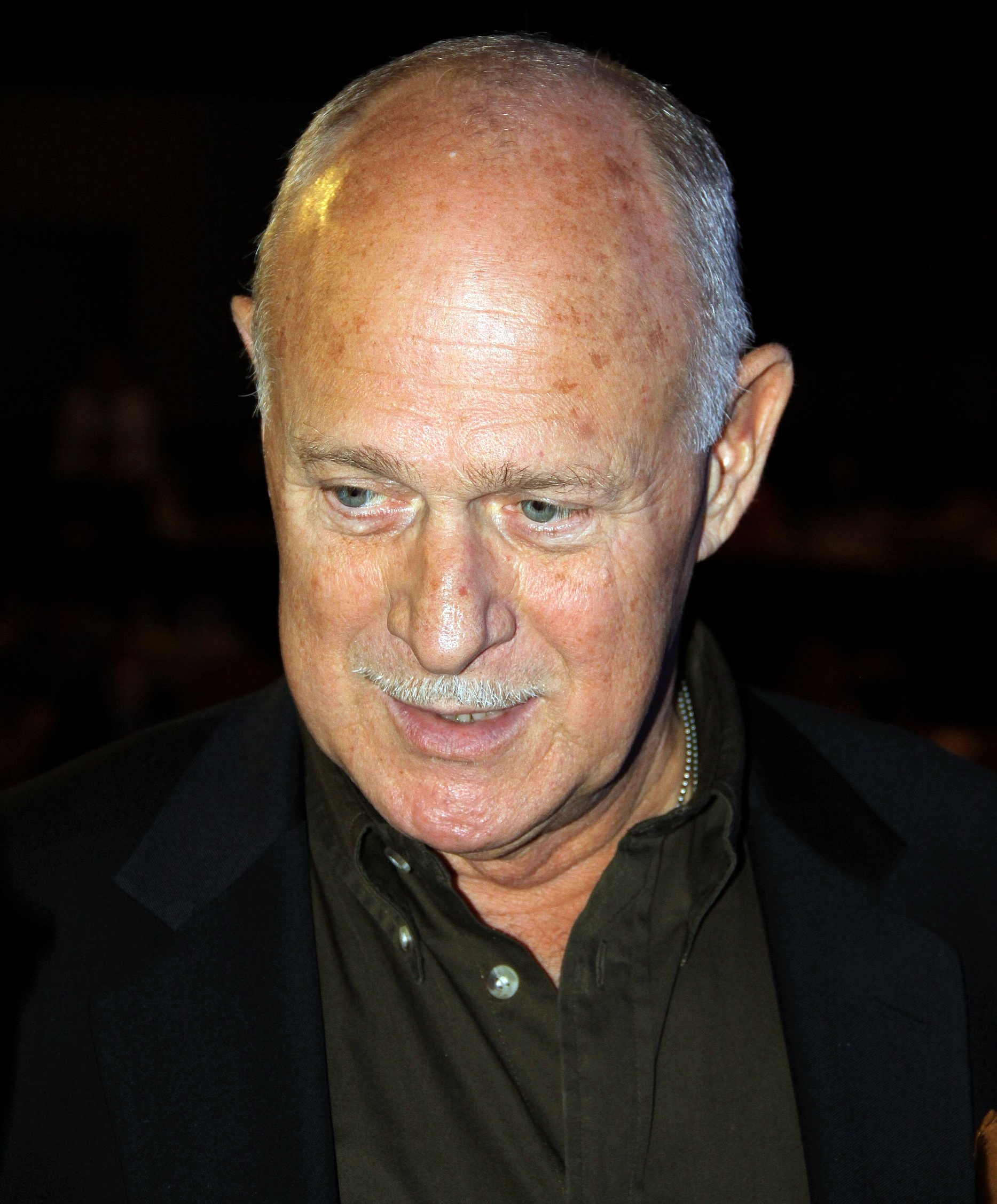
- McRaney in July 2010
- Born: Gerald Lee McRaney; August 19, 1947 (age 79); Collins, Mississippi, U.S.
- Occupation: Actor
- Years active: 1969–present
- Spouses: Beverly Root (m. 1967; div. 1971); Pat Moran (m. 1981; div. 1989); Delta Burke (m. 1989)
- Children: 3

Gerald Lee McRaney (born August 19, 1947) is an American television and film actor. McRaney is best known as one of the stars of the television shows Simon & Simon, Major Dad, Promised Land and House of Cards. He most recently starred as Admiral Hollace Kilbride on NCIS: Los Angeles. He was a series regular in the first season of the CBS drama series Jericho and the final season of the HBO series Deadwood. He appeared in a recurring role as main antagonist Mason Wood in season eight of Castle. Recently, he played Barlow Connally in the A&E series Longmire and had a recurring role in the NBC series This Is Us as Dr. Nathan Katowski, a role that earned him the Primetime Emmy Award for Outstanding Guest Actor in a Drama Series.

== Early life ==
McRaney was born in Collins, Mississippi, the son of Clyde and Edna McRaney. He is of Scottish and Choctaw ancestry. He graduated from Long Beach High School in Long Beach, Mississippi, then attended the University of Mississippi. Before finding success as an actor, McRaney worked in the Louisiana oil fields.

== Career ==
In film, he starred in Night of Bloody Horror (1969), a low-budget slasher film in which he played the lead character Wesley Stuart.

On television, McRaney appeared in multiple episodes of shows such as Gunsmoke, Police Woman, and Barnaby Jones. He appeared in The Dukes of Hazzard in the episode "Hazzard Connection" (November 9, 1979), played a receptionist in two different episodes of The Rockford Files, and portrayed Tim Ryder, a heroin-addicted Vietnam War veteran in one episode of Hawaii Five-O. In addition, he starred in numerous episodes of The Incredible Hulk playing roles as a jealous boyfriend, a jealous race car driver, an angry police officer, and a disturbed police chief, and his miniseries roles include Dr. Henderson in Women in White (1979) and a town local, Harry Owens in Roots: The Next Generations (1979).

McRaney became known for his role as Rick Simon, co-starring alongside Jameson Parker, in the popular CBS detective series Simon & Simon from 1981 to 1989. During his time on the series, he appeared with Parker in the film Jackals (1986), and appeared twice on sitcom Designing Women. He then starred as Major John McGillis in the successful CBS family sitcom Major Dad (1989–1993), and Russell Greene in the CBS family drama Promised Land (1996–1999), a spinoff of the popular series Touched by an Angel where he originated the character. He also portrayed business mogul Adam Brock in the last eight episodes of Darren Star's primetime soap opera Central Park West, which ran on CBS from 1995 to 1996.

McRaney later appeared as General Alan Adamle in two episodes of the NBC drama The West Wing. He also played a prominent role in the third and final season of the HBO television series Deadwood (2005–2006), as gold prospector George Hearst; and starred in the CBS postapocalyptic series Jericho as Johnston Green.

Additionally, he has acted in many television films, such as: Not Our Son (1995); A Holiday Romance (1999); Going for Broke (2003); and Ike: Countdown to D-Day (2004), as General George S. Patton. He also starred in an episode of Diagnosis: Murder (episode 1.13 "Lily") as Det. Andy Ruggio and CSI: Crime Scene Investigation (episode 9.24 "All In").

In the late 2000s, McRaney co-hosted the Outdoor Life Network hunting and shooting series The World of Beretta, drawing on his own sport interests. The series featured the sponsor's rifle and shotgun products in a number of hunting locations around the world, and often featured a celebrity shooter to hunt with McRaney.

In 2010, he starred as the villainous General Morrison in the film The A-Team (2010) and played a recurring role as CIA handler Carlton Shaw in the NBC action drama Undercovers. Also that year, he hosted a cable series on Spike TV that encouraged viewers Don't Be a Victim. One episode highlighted an instance wherein his longtime friend and Simon & Simon costar Jameson Parker was shot twice.

In 2011, he began playing a recurring role as a judge on the US drama Fairly Legal. In 2012, McRaney played General Luntz in the movie Red Tails, and Calvin in the film Heart of the Country. He played the wealthy, powerful real estate developer Barlow Connally in the A&E/Netflix series Longmire (2012–2015), and made several appearances in a guest role in the CBS comedy Mike & Molly (2012–2013). Later in 2013, he had a recurring role in the final season of the drama Southland.

From 2013 to 2017, he appeared in the Netflix series House of Cards as the billionaire Raymond Tusk of an energy corporation specializing in nuclear power. He also made two appearances in a supporting role on the FX Network drama Justified. In 2015, he starred in the dark comedy Focus as Bucky Spurgeon and in Coat of Many Colors as Rev. Jake Owens, Dolly Parton's maternal grandfather and preacher. In 2016, he appeared as main antagonist and recurring character Mason Wood (LockSat) during the eighth and final season of Castle.

From 2016 to 2022, he appeared in the NBC series This Is Us as Dr. Nathan Katowski, a role for which he won a Primetime Emmy Award. In 2018, he appeared in the USA Network series Shooter as Red Bama Sr.

McRaney appeared in a recurring role, on the CBS procedural drama, NCIS: Los Angeles, since 2014, playing U.S. Navy Vice Admiral (retired) Hollace Kilbride. In 2021, McRaney became a series regular with Admiral Kilbride being appointed the new director of the NCIS Special Projects Office in Los Angeles.

== Personal life ==
McRaney married his third wife, actress Delta Burke, on May 28, 1989; they had met two years earlier during her guest appearance on a Simon & Simon episode. He appeared on the series in which she starred, Designing Women, as Dash Goff (who was named after a real person from Fayetteville, Arkansas, whom Delta Burke's fellow castmate, Annie Potts, had met while filming Pass the Ammo on location).

In 1992, McRaney served as Bacchus in the Krewe of Bacchus at Mardi Gras in New Orleans, Louisiana.

Having played a Marine Corps veteran on Simon & Simon and a Marine Corps officer on Major Dad, he has always been very supportive of veterans and soldiers, although he is not a veteran himself. He made many visits to support the soldiers in Operation Desert Storm. During one USO-sponsored trip, McRaney visited sailors and Marines on board ships ported in Toulon, France, on Thanksgiving of 1993 and signed autographs for the men on board the ships. While on board the USS Ashland, he autographed one sailor's cowboy hat. He also visited troops during Operation Restore Hope in Somalia in 1993. In 1994 he visited troops of task force 1/87 deployed to Haiti for Operation Uphold Democracy. McRaney chaired the Department of Veterans Affairs' 2002 National Salute to Hospitalized Veterans campaign, honoring hospitalized veterans and promoting volunteerism at VA medical center. He has appeared in commercials for the Wounded Warrior Project.

In August 2004, McRaney underwent successful surgery for lung cancer, in Houston, Texas.

=== Politics ===
Endorsing incumbent Republican President George H. W. Bush for re-election in 1992, McRaney stated: "Most of my life I've been a Democrat, but the last several presidential elections have finally convinced me that I might as well go ahead and admit I'm a Republican." His first presidential vote was for Democrat Hubert Humphrey in 1968. At the 1992 Republican National Convention, McRaney introduced Second Lady Marilyn Quayle. Appearing at a campaign event for George H. W. Bush, McRaney called opponent Bill Clinton an "overeducated moron".

In 2008, McRaney supported Republican candidate John McCain for president.

McRaney has appeared in TV commercials on behalf of the National Rifle Association of America dating back to 1987.

== Filmography ==
=== Film ===
Year	Title	Role	Notes
1969	Night of Bloody Horror	Wesley Stuart	
1970	Women and Bloody Terror	Terrance Bradford	
1972	The Brain Machine	Willie West	
1975	Keep Off My Grass!	David Sherman	
1984	The NeverEnding Story	Barney Bux	
1986	Jackals	Jake Wheeler	
2000	Comanche	Col. Samuel Sturgis	Short film
2002	Hansel & Gretel	Father	
2006	Saving Shiloh	Ray Preston	
2009	Get Low	Rev. Gus Horton	
2010	The A-Team	General Russell Morrison	
2011	J. Edgar	Judge at Hauptmann Trial	Uncredited
2011	The Umpire	Joseph Woodward	Short film
2012	Red Tails	Major General Luntz	
2013	Heart of the Country	Calvin	
2014	The Best of Me	Tuck Hostetler	
2015	Focus	Bucky Spurgeon/Owens	
2016	The Disappointments Room	Judge Ernest R. Blacker	
2019	A Violent Separation	Tom Campbell	

=== Television ===
Year	Title	Role	Notes
1972	Night Gallery	Tuttle	Episode: "Deliveries in the Rear/Stop Killing Me/Dead Weight"
1972	Alias Smith and Jones	Telegrapher	Episode: "The Day the Amnesty Came Through"
1973–75	Gunsmoke	Gentry / Lonnie Colby / Pete Murphy	3 episodes
1974	Cannon	Winston	Episode: "Photo Finish"
1974	The F.B.I.	Sheriff's Deputy	Episode: "Deadly Ambition"
1974	Sons and Daughters	Mr. Wilson	Episode: "The Tryst"
1974	The F.B.I. Story: The FBI Versus Alvin Karpis, Public Enemy Number One	Smith	Television film
1974	The Waltons	Tim Collins	Episode: "The Book"
1974–76	Barnaby Jones	Pete / Dave Boyette / Jim Cabe	3 episodes
1975	Mannix	Professor Jim Duncan	Episode: "Edge of the Web"
1975	The Law	Hiller	3 episodes
1975	Petrocelli	Cliff / Santo	2 episodes
1975–76	The Streets of San Francisco	Jeff Dixon / Buck	2 episodes
1975–77	The Rockford Files	Irv / Manager / Jerryl / D.A. John Pleasance	4 episodes
1976	The Blue Knight	Steinmetz	3 episodes
1976	Police Woman	Comet	2 episodes
1976	Hawaii Five-O	Tim Ryder	Episode: "Target - A Cop"
1977	The Oregon Trail	Daniel J. Morehead	Episode: "Return of the Baby"
1977	The Six Million Dollar Man	Bob Marsh	Episode: "To Catch the Eagle"
1977	Switch	Hit Man	Episode: "Two on the Run"
1977	The Fantastic Journey	The Co-Pilot	Episode: "The Innocent Prey"
1977	Eight Is Enough		Episode: "Mortgage Burnin' Blues"
1977	CHiPs	Demick	Episode: "Aweigh We Go"
1977–80	The Incredible Hulk	Denny Kayle / Sam Roberts / Colin Roark / Chief Frank Rhodes	4 episodes
1978	Baretta	Tommy	Episode: "Why Me?"
1978	Logan's Run	Gera	Episode: "Turnabout"
1978	The Jordan Chance	Sid Burton	Television film
1979	Women in White	Dr. Gus Henderson	Television film
1979	Roots: The Next Generations	Harry Owens	Episode #1.2
1979	How the West Was Won	Thorne	Episode: "Luke"
1979	240-Robert	Nick	Episode: "Bank Job"
1979	The Dukes of Hazzard	First Workman	Episode: "Hazzard Connection"
1980	The Aliens Are Coming	Patrolman Ashley	Television film
1980	Where the Ladies Go	Merle Johnson	Television film
1980	Rape and Marriage: The Rideout Case	Cliff Sulkes	Television film
1981	The Misadventures of Sheriff Lobo	Jake	Episode: "Keep on Buckin'"
1981	The Seal		Television film
1981–89	Simon & Simon	Rick Simon	156 episodes
1982	It's Not Easy	Jack Long	Unaired pilot
1982	Magnum, P.I.	Rick Simon	Episode: "Ki'is Don't Lie"
1982	Memories Never Die	Howdy Tilford	Television film
1983	The Haunting Passion	Dan Evans	Television film
1984	City Killer	Lieutenant "Eck" Eckford	Television film
1986	Easy Prey	Christopher Wilder	Television film
1987	A Hobo's Christmas	Charlie	Television film
1987–88	Designing Women	Dash Goff	2 episodes
1988	The People Across the Lake	Chuck Yoman	Television film
1988	Where the Hell's That Gold?!!?	Jones	Television film
1989	Murder by Moonlight	Dennis Huff	Television film
1989–93	Major Dad	Major John D. MacGillis	96 episodes. Also executive producer.
1990	Newhart	Himself	Episode: "Lights! Camera! Contractions!"; uncredited
1990	Blind Vengeance	Garr Hagar	Television film
1990	Vestige of Honor	Major Falon	Television film
1991	Love and Curses... And All That Jazz	Ross	Television film
1991	Fatal Friendship	Hank Landrum	Television film
1993	Scattered Dreams	George Messenger	Television film
1994	Armed and Innocent	Bobby Lee Holland	Television film
1994	Burke's Law	Ronnie Gelico	Episode: "Who Killed the Starlet?"
1994	The Commish	Father Eddie Baxter	Episode: "Father Eddie"
1994	Diagnosis: Murder	Det. Andy Ruggio	Episode: "Lily"
1994	Motorcycle Gang	Cal Morris	Television film
1994	Deadly Vows	Tom Weston	Television film
1994	Someone She Knows	Frank Mayfield	Television film
1995	Jake Lassiter: Justice on the Bayou	Jake Lassiter	Television film
1995	Coach	Jim Collins	Episode: "The Walk-On"
1995	Simon & Simon: In Trouble Again	Rick Simon	Television film
1995	Not Our Son	George Keller	Television film
1995	Women of the House	Dash Goff	Episode: "The Afternoon Wife"
1995	The Stranger Beside Me	Dave Morgan	Television film
1995	ABC Afterschool Special	Alex—As an Adult	Episode: "Fast Forward"
1995	Murder, She Wrote	Terry Folger	Episode: "A Quaking in Aspen"
1995	Nothing Lasts Forever	Dr. Lawrence Barker	Television film
1995–98	Touched by an Angel	Dr. Joe Patcherik / Russell Greene	5 episodes
1995–96	Central Park West	Adam Brock	9 episodes
1996	Home of the Brave	Russell Greene	Television film
1996–99	Promised Land	Russell Greene	68 episodes
1997	A Nightmare Come True	Don Zarn	Television film
1997	A Thousand Men and a Baby	Capt. John "Chick" Hayward	Television film
1999	Shake, Rattle and Roll: An American Love Story	Howard Danner	Television film
1999	A Holiday Romance	Cal Peterson	Television film
2000	Take Me Home: The John Denver Story	Dutch	Television film
2001	These Arms of Mine	Mitchell Rankin	Episode: "King of America"
2001	JAG	Sergeant Major Charvis Krohn	Episodes: "Miracles" & "Salvation"
2001	Danger Beneath the Sea	Admiral Eugene Justice	Television film
2001–04	The West Wing	USAF Lt Gen Alan Adamle	2 episodes
2002	Becoming Glen		Television film
2002	Third Watch	Glen Hobart	2 episodes
2002	Tornado Warning	Dr. Jake Arledge	Television film
2002	Presidio Med	Coach Fontina	2 episodes
2003	The Dan Show	Ray Kennedy	Television film
2003	The Dead Zone	Harrison Fisher	Episode: "Scars"
2003	Mister Sterling	Burt Gammel	5 episodes
2003	Going For Broke	Jim Bancroft	Television film
2004	One Tree Hill	Royal Scott	Episode: "Crash Course in Polite Conversations"
2004	Ike: Countdown to D-Day	George S. Patton	Television film
2004	Commando Nanny	Ben Winter	Unaired episodes
2005–06	Deadwood	George Hearst	13 episodes Nominated—Screen Actors Guild Award for Outstanding Performance by an Ensemble in a Drama Series (2006)
2006–08	Jericho	Johnston Green	23 episodes
2008	Women's Murder Club	Martin Boxer	2 episodes
2009	CSI: Crime Scene Investigation	Eli Schindler	Episode: "All In"
2010–12	Undercovers	Carlton Shaw	13 episodes
2011	Bird Dog	Sam McGrath	Television film
2011–12	Fairly Legal	Judge David Nicastro	5 episodes
2012–13	Mike & Molly	Captain Patrick Murphy	6 episodes
2012–15	Longmire	Barlow Connally	8 episodes
2013	Justified	Josiah Cairn	2 episodes
2013	Southland	Hicks	5 episodes
2013–17	House of Cards	Raymond Tusk	16 episodes Nominated—Screen Actors Guild Award for Outstanding Performance by an Ensemble in a Drama Series (2014)
2014	Manhattan	Sec. Hentry Stimson	Episode: "Perestroika"
2014, 2018–19, 2021–23	NCIS: Los Angeles	Ret. Navy Admiral Hollace Kilbride	54 episodes
2015	Agent X	Malcolm Millar	10 episodes
2015	Dolly Parton's Coat of Many Colors	Rev. Jake Owens	Television film
2016	Castle	Mason Wood	2 episodes
2016–22	This Is Us	Dr. Nathan Katowski	10 episodes Primetime Emmy Award for Outstanding Guest Actor in a Drama Series (2017); Nominated—Primetime Emmy Award for Outstanding Guest Actor in a Drama Series (2018)
2016	Dolly Parton's Christmas of Many Colors: Circle of Love	Rev. Jake Owens	Television film
2017	24: Legacy	Henry Donovan	10 episodes
2018	Santa Clarita Diet	Ed Thune	Episode: "Pasión"
2018	Shooter	Red Bama Sr.	11 episodes
2018	A Million Little Things	Lenny	Episode: "Friday Night Dinner"
2019	Deadwood: The Movie	George Hearst	Television film
2019	Heartstrings	Tom	Episode: "If I Had Wings"
2020	Filthy Rich	Eugene Monreaux	10 episodes
2021–22	Duncanville	Dick Harris (voice)	3 episodes
2023	Family Guy	Old West (voice)	Episode: "Old West"
2025	Paradise	Kane Bradford	4 episodes
2025	Murdaugh: Death in the Family	Randolph Murdaugh	Miniseries
