= Charles Dellschau =

American outsider artist (1830–1923)

- Born: Charles August Albert Dellschau; June 4, 1830; Brandenburg, Prussia
- Died: April 20, 1923 (aged 92); Houston, Texas, United States
- Burial place: Washington Cemetery, Houston, Texas, United States
- Spouse: Antonia Hilt (m. 1861; died 1877)
- Children: 4

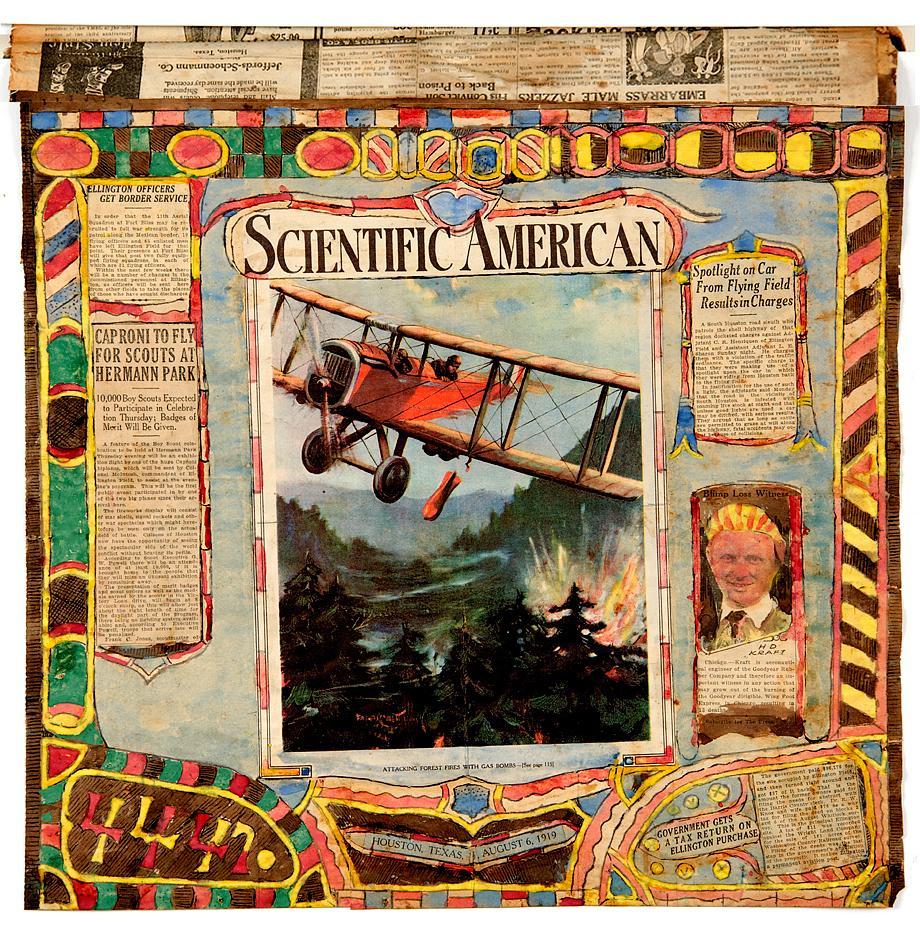
An example of Dellschau's work.

Charles August Albert Dellschau (4 June 1830 – 20 April 1923) was a Prussian-American who gained posthumous fame after the discovery of his large scrapbooks that contained drawings, collages and watercolors of airplanes and airships. He has been classified as one of the first visionary artists.

== Life ==
Little is known about Charles Dellschau's life. Primary sources are scarce and secondary sources often contain contradictory information. It is known that he emigrated from Brandenburg, Prussia to Texas in 1850, where he worked as a butcher. In 1860, Dellschau received his letter of citizenship in Fort Bend County, and in 1861 he married Antonia Hilt, the widow of Pierre Hilt, who already had a daughter from her previous marriage. Charles Dellschau's marriage to Antonia took place in Richmond, Texas., and at some point after the marriage, Charles started working as a sales clerk in his in-laws' saddlery shop. In addition to his stepdaughter, Dellschau had three children: two daughters, Bertha and Mary, and a son, Edward, who died in 1877 at age 6. Dellschau's wife, Antonia, died in the same year, leaving her husband a widower at age 47.

In 1865 Dellschau signed the Civil War Amnesty Oath, indicating that he was a soldier for the Confederate States Army. In this document Charles Dellschau is described as a fair complexioned man of 5'3" with auburn hair and hazel eyes.

After his retirement in 1899, he lived with his stepdaughter and her husband, and worked in their attic apartment in Houston, Texas, where he filled at least 13 notebooks with drawings, watercolor paintings, and collages depicting fantastical airships. He died at the age of 93, and was buried in the Washington cemetery in Houston in Stelzig Plot A-70. On his grave marker, the last name is misspelled as "Dellschaw," probably as a result of the "u" being written with an elongated tail on his death certificate. His grave marker also lists his initials on as C. A. instead of C. A. A.

== Posthumous recognition ==
After his death, Dellschau's home remained in the hands of his descendants. His notebooks of paintings and drawings, as well as his diaries were left virtually untouched for half a century until the late 1960s. Following a fire, the house was cleared and at least 12 of the notebooks were placed with trash at the sidewalk to be discarded. Fred Washington, a local antiques and used furniture dealer, spotted the books, and for $100 bought them from the trash collector. The books sat undisturbed in Washington's store under a pile of discarded carpet for over a year. In 1968, Mary Jane Victor, an art student at the University of St. Thomas in Houston stumbled upon the notebooks, and persuaded Washington to lend some of them to the university for a display on the story of flight. She also brought them to the attention of art patron and collector Dominique de Menil. Mrs. de Menil purchased four of the notebooks for $1,500. Of the remaining books, seven were purchased by Peter (Pete) G. Navarro, a Houston commercial artist and UFO researcher. After studying them, Navarro sold four of the notebooks to the Witte Museum in San Antonio, and the San Antonio Museum of Art. One notebook ultimately ended in the private abcd (art brut connaissance & diffusion) collection in Paris belonging to Bruno Decharme, a French filmmaker and art collector. The rest of the notebooks ended up in private hands. Some were dismantled and single pages were sold. In 2016, a double sided page dated 1919, sold for $22,500 at Christie's.

Dellschau's earliest known work is a diary dated 1899, and the last is an 80-page book dated 1921–1922, giving his career as an artist a 21-year span. His work was in large part a record of the activities of the "Sonora Aero Club," of which he was a purported member. Dellschau termed his illustrations "plates", and his numbering of known examples begins at 1601; modern scholars believe earlier plates were lost or destroyed.

Dellschau's writings describe the club as a secret group of flight enthusiasts who met in Sonora, California in the mid-19th century. According to Dellschau, one of the club members discovered a formula for an anti-gravity fuel called "NB Gas". The club mission was to design and build the first navigable aircraft using the NB Gas for lift and propulsion. Dellschau called these flying machines Aeros. Dellschau never claimed to be a pilot or a designer of any of the airships; he identifies himself only as a draftsman for the Sonora Aero Club. His collages incorporate newspaper clippings (called "press blooms") of then-current news articles about aeronautical advances and disasters.

As early as 1970, Navarro believed Dellschau's works might have a basis in reality and were perhaps tied to the mystery airships reported in the United States in the 1890s. Though Dellschau's work mentioned names of purported Sonora Aero Club members, research of census records, voting rosters, and death records has found nothing to substantiate the existence of this group, though a few gravestones in the Columbia Cemetery share identical surnames. Art historian Tracey Baker-White found no evidence of the purported Aero Club members in the times and places described by Dellschau, but did find similar names in surrounding areas: "I haven't found them in Sonora in the 1850s, but I've found them in Napa Valley in 1900, or in San Francisco in 1872, or in Stockton in 1872. There are possible links, but there's nothing that is in Sonora." While there is no evidence Dellschau ever lived in California, his notebooks contain numerous references to known individuals from that state, including law enforcement officials and businessmen. Historian Brett Holman, a specialist in early 1900s aircraft, finds it improbable that Dellschau's claims have any historical accuracy. Holman believes Dellschau may have lived in California between 1856 and 1860 when his whereabouts are unknown, but also notes that Dellschau's claimed Aeros are technologically far more advanced than verified airship from the 1860s (such as Solomon Andrews's). There is no plausible explanation for the "NB gas" described by Dellschau, Holman concludes, and he opines Dellschau was simply an amateur enthusiast who created his own fanciful aircraft designs based in part on known flight technology of the late 1800 and early 1900s, and possibly was also inspired by news reports of the mystery airships of the same era. James W. Moseley in his Saucer Smear newsletter was also skeptical of any reality behind Dellschau's artwork, writing it was "hard to understand" how such elaborate machines could have been flown in the "fairly populated area" around Sonora without being noted in the historical record. It is speculated that, like the voluminous "Realms of the Unreal" notebooks by outsider artist Henry Darger (1882–1973), the Sonora Aero Club is a fiction by Dellschau.

Dellschau's first one-person exhibition "Charles Dellschau - Aeronautical notebooks" and its accompanying catalogue was held in 2000 at the Ricco/Maresca Gallery in New York City, some 75 years after his death.

Witte (which mounted an exhibition of Dellschau and Da Vinci called "Flights of the Imagination") and the San Antonio Museum (which curated a solo exhibition of Dellschau entitled "Flight or Fancy? The Secret Life of Charles A. A. Dellschau", also shown at the Menillo Museum in Florida) and the Menil Collection. Dellschau's artwork is also in the collection of the Philadelphia Museum, the abcd Art Brut collection in Paris, which owns an entire book, the High Museum in Atlanta, the American Folk Art Museum in New York, the Philadelphia Museum of Art, the John Michael Kohler Art Center, and several prominent private collections in America and Europe. Several Dellschau drawings were put on display at the Museum of Everything, London England in 2009 as well as in Turin in 2010. The American Visionary Museum in Baltimore has shown the work of Dellschau on several occasions and the INTUIT Museum in Chicago presented a one-person exhibition of Dellschau's art in September 2012.

Charles Dellschau's life and art is the subject of a monograph released in the spring of 2013 produced by Marquand Books, Stephen Romano and distributed by Distributed Art Publishers with essays by Thomas McEvilley, Tracy Baker-White, Roger Cardinal, James Brett, Thomas Crouch, Barbara Safarova and Randall Morris. The book has been reviewed in Raw Vision magazine by Tom Patterson, as well as in Bookforum, and Intuit magazine. In September 2026, ambient artist Hal Graham released the album Airships, with tracks inspired by Dellschau's art.

== Critical analysis ==
Dellschau is regarded as one of America's earliest visionary artists. His work has been interpreted as a testimony to the sense of optimism that new technologies inspire as they change the way people see the world. Flight, up until that time, had been a metaphor for man's pathos—or his inability to accomplish what he was not meant to. Dellschau's work is also remarkable in that it uses the medium of watercolor brilliantly, often using water as the medium with a subtle tint of color.

Dellschau's work shows the influence of circus banner painting, in its use of centralized subjects and ornamental borders, and often possesses a jewel-like quality. Reviewing the 1998 Ricco Maresca exhibition, the New York Times said:

…his images define a fleet of craft that, at their most recognizable, suggest eccentric balloons or dirigibles, or flying carriages, and sometimes include pilots and passengers. Framed by further stripes, as well as words, names and numbers, the drawings intimate a universe almost as elaborate as Rizzoli's in a style reminiscent of Monty Python.

== Conspiracy theories ==
The inclusion in some of Dellschau's sketches of the word TRUMP and the numbers 45 and 47 has fueled online speculation concerning Donald Trump (the 45th and 47th United States president) allegedly having links to time travel or unidentified aerial phenomena (UAP).

== Partial list of exhibitions ==
- "The Sky is the Limit" - University of St. Thomas, Houston, Texas, 1969
- "The I at Play" - Institute of Arts, Rice University, Houston, Texas, 1977
- "Texas Selections from the Menil Collection" - Galveston Art Center, Galveston, Texas, 1991
- "Wind In My Hair" - American Visionary Museum, 1996
- "Aeronautical Notebooks" - Ricco Maresca Gallery, 1998
- "Plots and Inventions" - Ramapo College, New Jersey, 2000
- "Visionary Dreamers" - University of Syracuse, New York, 2002
- "Flight or Fancy? The Secret Life of Charles A. A. Dellschau" - San Antonio Museum of Art, Focus Gallery, 2002
- "The Secret Life of Charles Dellschau" - San Antonio Museum, Menilo Museum, 2004
- "Eye of the World: Miniature and Microcosm in the Art of the Self Taught" - Addison Gallery of American Art, Pennsylvania, 2002
- "American Self Taught from the High Museum" - High Museum Annex, 2005
- "Dopes, Dupes, and Demagogues: Viewed by Outsiders" - Louise Ross Gallery, 2004
- "Create and Be Recognized: Photography on the Edge" - Southeastern Center for Contemporary Art (SECCA), 2005
- "Inner Worlds Outside" - Whitechapel Gallery, London, 2005
- "Flights of Imagination" - Witte Museum, San Antonio, 2008
- "ARTnow" contemporary art fair - Stephen Romano booth #21, New York NY, 2008
- "Messages and Magic: Collage and Assemblage in American Art" - John Michael Kohler Arts Center, Sheboygan, Wisconsin, 2008
- "Artists Books Through Time: Vol. 1", Cavin Morris Gallery, New York, 2009
- Museum of Everything", London, England. 2009 -
- Museum of Everything", Pinacoteca Agnelli, Turin, Italy. 2010 -
- "Outsider Art Fair", Stephen Romano Booth #11, New York NY, 2011
- "Seeing Stars: Visionary Drawing from the Collection", Menil Collection, Houston, TX, 2012
- "All Things Round" - American Visionary Art Museum, Baltimore, MD, 2011 - 2012
- "Darker Stars: The Roots of Steampunk Art", Cavin Morris Gallery, New York, 2012
- "Jubilation/Rumination: Life, Real and Imagined", American Folk Art Museum, 2012
- "Museum of Everything", Paris, France. 2009 -
- "Farfetched", curated by Roger Manley and Tom Pattersen, Gregg Art Museum 2013
- "Restless II", Cavin Morris Gallery, New York, 2013
- "PULSE Art Fair New York 2013", Stephen Romano Booth B6 2013
- "Outsider Art Fair Paris 2013", Cavin Morris Gallery 2013
- "The Metro Show", New York, Stephen Romano Gallery 2014, 2015.
- "Welcome To The Dreamtime", Stephen Romano Gallery New York 2014
- "Mysterium Cosmograhicum", Stephen Romano Gallery New York 2014
- "Abundae Cornu Copea", Stephen Romano Gallery New York 2014 -2015
- "Opus Hypnagogia", Morbid Anatomy Museum New York 2015
- "Lexicon Infernali", Stephen Romano Gallery New York 2015
- "Charles Dellschau (1830 - 1923): American Visionary", Stephen Romano Gallery New York 2015
- "Till It's Gone", The Istanbul Museum of Modern Art 2016
- "Materia Prima", BLAM Gallery, Brooklyn, 2016
- "STATIM FINIS", Stephen Romano Gallery 2016
- "Outsider Art Fair", Stephen Romano Gallery 2017
- "Art Basel Miami", Andrew Edwin Gallery 2016
- "Outsider Art Fair", John Ollman Gallery 2018
- "The Armory Show", John Ollman Gallery 2018
- "SCOPE Art Fair", Stephen Romano Gallery 2018
- "The Museum of Everything", The Gallery of Old and New, Tasmania 2017 - 2018
- "Outsider Art From Texas", The Webb Gallery, Texas 2018
- "Vestiges & Verse: Notes from the Newfangled Epic", American Folk Art Museum 2018
- "L'Envol", La Maison Rouge, Paris 2018
- ""Out of This World: Artists Explore Space", curated by Larry Gagosian for the 2018 Seattle Art Fair's Gagosian Gallery booth August 2018
- Outsider Art Fair, New York, January 2019
- "Opening the Third Eye", Stephen Romano Gallery, October 2018
- "Charles Dellschau and the Mythology of Flight", Curated by Brian Chidester, Brooklyn Antiquarian Book Fair, October 2019
- Outsider Art Fair, Paris, October 2019, Galerie Arthur Borgnis
- "Supernatural America" organized by the Minneapolis Art Institute, curated by Robert Cozzolino on view at The Toledo Museum of Art through Sept. 5, 2021, October 7, 2021 – January 2, 2022: Speed Art Museum, February 19 – May 15, 2022: Minneapolis Institute of Art.

== See also ==
- Mystery airship

== Notes and references ==
- Gershon, Pete (18 February 2014). Painting the Town Orange: The Stories behind Houston's Visionary Art Environments. The History Press. ISBN 978-1-62584-972-4.
- Crenshaw, Dennis G.; Navarro, Pete (2009). The Secrets of Dellschau: The Sonora Aero Club and the Airships of the 1800s, A True Story. Anomalist Books. ISBN 978-1-933665-35-1.
- Drake, Clinton; Jach, Theresa (2014). Richmond. Arcadia Publishing. ISBN 978-1-4671-3119-3.
- Congdon, Kristin G.; Hallmark, Kara Kelley (2012). American Folk Art: A Regional Reference [2 volumes]: A Regional Reference. ABC-CLIO. ISBN 978-0-313-34937-9.
- Wertkin, Gerard C. (2004). Encyclopedia of American Folk Art. Routledge. ISBN 978-1-135-95614-1.
- Busby, Michael (2004). Solving the 1897 Airship Mystery. Pelican Publishing. ISBN 978-1-4556-1205-5.
- Danelek, J. Allan (2013). The Great Airship of 1897: A Provocative Look at the Most Mysterious Aviation Event in History. SCB Distributors. ISBN 978-1-935487-16-6.
- Brett, James; McEvilley, Thomas; Baker-White, Tracy; Cardinal, Roger (2013). Charles Dellschau. Marquand Books. ISBN 978-1-935202-90-5.
- Rosen, Rebecca J. (21 March 2013). "Charles A. A. Dellschau Dreams of Flying: The Amazing Story of an Airship Club That Might Never Have Existed". The Atlantic.
- Reif, Rita (25 January 1998). "ARTS/ARTIFACTS; A Saddler Who Dreamt Of Flying Machines". The New York Times.
- Smith, Roberta (23 January 1998). "ART REVIEW; Outsiders Come In For Attention". The New York Times.
- Greenwood, Cynthia (10 December 1998). "Secrets of the Sonora Aero Club". Houston Press. "Taken at face value, Dellschau's collages document the feats of the Sonora Aero Club, a secretive group dedicated to the creation of "aeros," or flying machines. In code, and bad spelling in both English and German, Dellschau recounted how, in his youth 50 years before, he and fellow club members gleefully ruled the skies of Gold Rush California, piloting fantastical airships of their own invention."
- Redniss, Lauren (Spring 2000). "The Aeronautical Notebooks of Charles Dellschau". Raw Vision Magazine.
