= Night of the Strangler =

- Theatrical release poster
- Directed by: Joy N. Houck Jr.
- Written by: J. J. Milane; Robert A. Weaver; Jeffrey Newton
- Produced by: Albert J. Salzer
- Starring: Micky Dolenz; James Ralston; Chuck Patterson
- Cinematography: Dennis J. Cipnic
- Music by: Jim Helms
- Production company: Joy-Oke Productions
- Distributed by: Howco International Pictures
- Release date: 1972
- Running time: 90 minutes
- Country: United States

Night of the Strangler is a 1972 American blaxploitation mystery film directed by Joy N. Houck Jr. and starring Micky Dolenz and James Ralston. It depicts the story of Denise Roberts and her plans to enter into an interracial marriage with her baby's father; these plans are disrupted by his murder, which begins an escalating series of killings involving her brothers Vance (Dolenz) and Dan (Ralston) and their loved ones.

The film was released under several alternate titles. Its theme of racial conflict attracted criticism at the time, and the film did not perform well financially. More recent critics have expressed mixed opinions of the film's quality.

== Plot ==
In New Orleans, Denise Roberts tells her brothers, Vance and Dan, that she is pregnant. Dan learns the baby's father is black, threatens her and her fiancé, and demands she get an abortion. After returning to New York, Denise tells her fiancé she has lost the child. While she is expressing concern about her brother's threats, an assassin kills her fiancé. Once back in New Orleans, an intruder in Denise's apartment drowns her in her bathtub, then slits her wrists in an attempt to disguise the murder as a suicide.

Weeks later, the long-absent black priest, Father Jessie, returns to the local parish. Dan marries Carol, who had previously been Vance's girlfriend. Several murders follow. After the wedding, Carol is killed by a venomous snake concealed in a bouquet of roses delivered to their home. The Roberts's gardener, Willie, attempts to stab Dan at the local marina, but Dan shoots him to death in self-defense. The assassin returns and prepares to shoot Dan, but is instead shot by a guard at the marina. Vance's wife, Ann, is killed by a poisoned arrow from a booby trap in Vance's car. Blaming his brother for Ann's death, Vance stabs Dan in the chest with a throwing knife, but Dan again kills in self-defense.

Jessie enters the scene and explains that he is actually Jessie's twin brother Jake; the real Jessie was the man who had gotten Denise pregnant, and Jake had orchestrated the string of murders in revenge for his death. He kills Dan and leaves the scene shortly before the police arrive.

The next day Jake has packed up to leave town, but as he starts to get in his car he suddenly screams and leaps out as the two police officers who have been trying to solve the murders look on. Presumably, the police put the venomous snake in his car in order to get him to trip up.

== Cast ==
- Micky Dolenz as Vance
- James Ralston as Dan
- Michael Anthony as Lt. De Vivo
- Chuck Patterson as Father Jessie / Jake
- Susan McCullough as Denise
- Katie Tilley as Ann
- Ann Barrett as Carol
- Warren J. Kenner as Willie
- Ed Brown as Jack Markam
- Harold Sylvester as Jim Bunch (as Harold Sylvester Jr.)
- Stocker Fontelieu as Father Babbin
- Wilbur Swartz as Monsignor Greyson
- Adrian C. Benjamin Jr. as Dr. Labewitz
- George Wood as Guard
- Anthony Buonagura as Mike

Production began with another actor in the role of Vance, but Albert J. Salzer found his performance unacceptable, and stopped production to replace him with Dolenz. This was the film acting debut for both Chuck Patterson and Harold Sylvester.

== Production ==
A variant theatrical release poster, as Is the Father Black Enough?, marketed the film's theme of racial tension.

Night of the Strangler was filmed in New Orleans in 1972. Production values were generally low; for example, the boom mic is visible in several scenes. A lyricist and vocalist are both credited, but no songs are present in known prints of the film. The film was released under a variety of titles. The American Film Institute lists The Ace of Spaces as a working title, but that title may have also been used for distribution. At least one surviving print has the slightly longer title The Night of the Strangler, while other releases marketed the film as Dirty Dan, Dirty Dan's Women, Is the Father Black Enough? or Vengeance is Mine. The reason for some of the film's alternate titles is not always obvious. Although Is the Father Black Enough?, along with the film's marketing, was intended to highlight the theme of racial tension, no justification for Night of the Strangler is obvious: there is no strangler nor any death by strangulation in the film.

The release date is also unclear. The AFI considers a June 1972 release reported by BoxOffice to be unconfirmed, and instead lists the film (as Dirty Dan's Women) as having first screened in 1973. However, Nicolas Winding Refn claims an August 1972 release (as Dirty Dan), while film historian Gerald R. Butters gives the date of the Chicago première at the Loop Theater (as Is the Father Black Enough?) as October 13, 1972. Surviving prints list a 1972 copyright date, but no copyright registration was ever filed for the film.

== Reception and legacy ==
According to film historian Gerald Butters, this film's showings at a cinema in the Chicago Loop were indicative of the trend toward blaxploitation releases in the early 1970s. However, the film performed poorly, and was screened there for only about two weeks, nor was it profitable elsewhere. Mike Royko criticized the movie's themes of racial violence (especially the advertising phrase “A racist wind blows the dust from a black man’s grave to choke the honkies to death.”) and suggested that this film, along with others like Slaughter, risked contributing to real-world crime.

In a later review of the film for TCM Underground, David Sterritt criticizes the film's plot and production values, but comments positively on the acting of several members of the cast. The reviewer for pop culture review site Nerdly similarly disliked Dennis J. Clipnic's "out of focus cinematography", but generally praised the acting and found the racial themes remained relevant in 2015. Refn included the controversial Is the Father Black Enough? film poster in The Art of Seeing, his coffee table book collection of the art of exploitation cinema.

In July 1983, the British pre-certification video distributor Cinema Indoors released the film (as Vengeance is Mine) on VHS and Betamax. The film preservation and distribution company Vinegar Syndrome restored a print of the film held by the American Genre Film Archive and released it (as Night of the Strangler) on DVD.

== Bibliography ==
- Albright, Brian (2012). Regional Horror Films, 1958-1990: A State-by-State Guide with Interviews. McFarland. ISBN 978-0-7864-7227-7.
- Butters, Gerald R. (2015). From Sweetback to Super Fly: Race and Film Audiences in Chicago's Loop. University of Missouri Press. ISBN 978-0-8262-2036-3.
- Howard, Josiah (2008). Blaxploitation Cinema: the Essential Reference Guide. FAB Press. ISBN 978-1-903254-37-0.
- Riggs, Thomas, ed. (2000). Contemporary Theatre, Film, and Television. Vol. 31. Gale / Cengage Learning. ISBN 978-0-7876-4636-3.
