= Mystery airship =

Wave of UFO sightings in the US in 1896/97

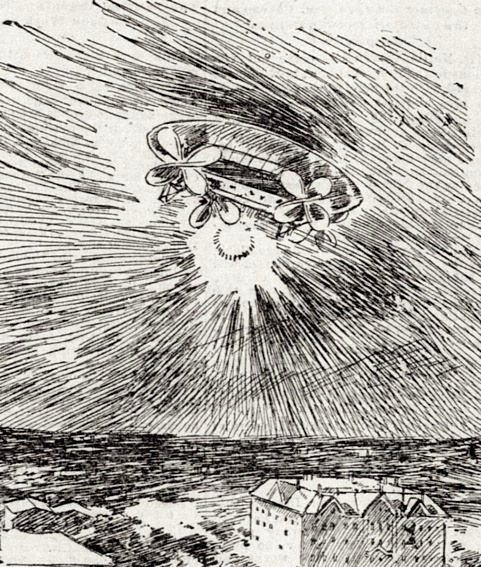
Mystery airship illustrated in the San Francisco Call, November 22, 1896

The mystery airship or phantom airship was a phenomenon that thousands of people across the United States claimed to have observed from late 1896 through mid 1897. Typical airship reports involved nighttime sightings of unidentified flying lights, but more detailed accounts reported actual airborne craft similar to an airship or dirigible. Mystery airship reports are seen as a cultural predecessor to modern claims of extraterrestrial-piloted UFO's or flying saucers.

Reports of the alleged airship crewmen and pilots usually described them as humanoid, although sometimes the crew claimed to be from Mars. It was widely believed at the time that the mystery airships were the product of some inventor or genius who was not ready to make knowledge of his creation public.

It has been frequently argued that the mystery airship sightings could not have represented genuine dirigibles as no officially documented test flights of long-range powered airships or airplanes of any kind in the United States from the period are known to exist and "it would have been impossible, not to mention irrational, to keep such a thing secret." Although several experimental airships had been manufactured and tested prior to the 1896–97 reports (e.g. Solomon Andrews made successful test flights of his Aereon in New Jersey in 1863 and Frederick Marriott successfully demonstrated his small airship Avitor Hermes Jr. in California in 1869), the technology of the day could not possibly have produced airships with the capabilities that people were reportedly seeing in 1896–97. Reece and others note that contemporary American newspapers of the "yellow journalism" era were more likely to print manufactured stories and hoaxes than are modern news sources, and editors of the late 19th century often would have expected the reader to understand that such stories were false.

Initially, most journalists of the period did not appear to take the airship reports very seriously; however, as the sightings continued, several newspapers covered the story with genuine wonder and interest, while others were more skeptical and even hostile. Some newspapers denounced the entire airship story as nonsense and openly mocked and ridiculed the witnesses and believers, dismissing them as drunks, fools or liars. After the major 1896–97 wave ended, the entire airship story quickly fell from public consciousness and was all but forgotten for nearly seventy years. During the mid 1960s, the airship phenomenon began to receive renewed interest as reports were gradually rediscovered in the archives of old newspapers by contemporary UFO investigators who suggested the 1896–97 airship waves might represent earlier precursors to the modern era of UFO sightings that began in the United States during the late 1940s.

== Background ==
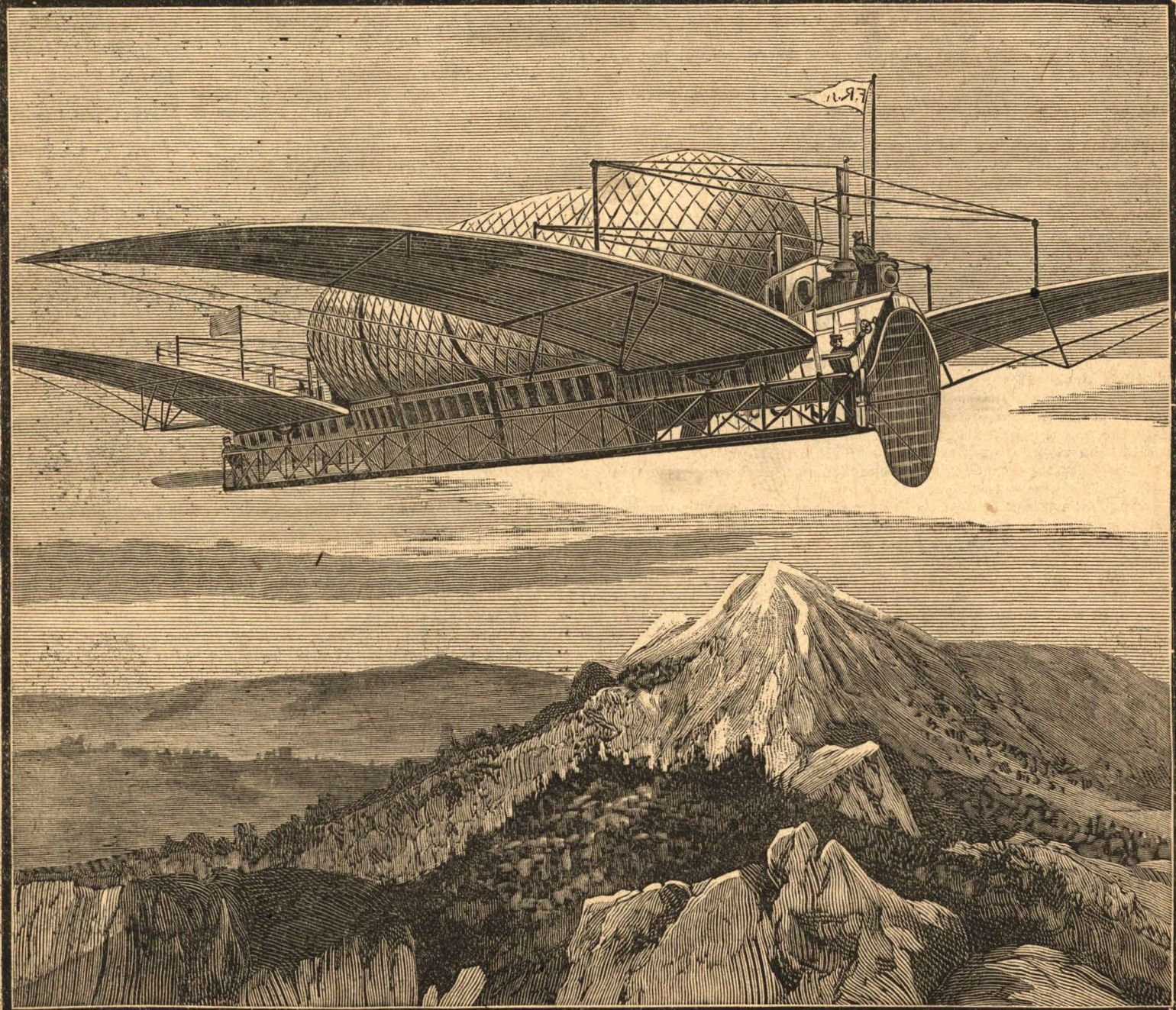
A fictional airship from the 1894 story Over the Andes with Frank Reade, Jr., in his New Air-Ship

A number of popular science fiction novels dealing with airships and their secretive inventors were published in the years before the airship sightings. Especially popular among American audiences were the Frank Reade stories by Luis Senarens, which began in 1882 and frequently centered on airships. The wildly successful Frank Reade Library ran to 191 stories. Senarens' acquaintance Jules Verne borrowed the conceit of a secretive inventor who had developed a powerful airship for his novel Robur the Conqueror, which was published in the US in 1887. The airship stories of the prolific science fiction author Robert Duncan Milne were also serialized in San Francisco newspapers during the 1890s.

The late 19th century was a period of intense technological innovation, including the invention of the telephone and automobile. Widespread publications about both lighter-than-air and heavier-than-air flight in the late 19th century gave rise to a common belief that the development of a successful airship was imminent.

On November 17, 1896, the very same day the first sighting of the mystery airship occurred in Sacramento, California, the Sacramento Bee printed what claimed to be a telegram from a New York inventor stating that he was flying his airship from New York to California and would arrive there within two days.

=== Earlier sightings ===
In July 1868, The Zoologist carried a report from a local newspaper in Copiapó, Chile, regarding a "gigantic bird" with "brilliant scales" that made a metallic sound had been seen flying over the town. Charles Fort, in his 1931 book Lo!, discussed this report along with various other reports of aerial apparitions from the 19th and 20th centuries. Fort observed that "inhabitants of the backwoods of China" might "similarly describe one of this earth's airships floating over their farms" (curiously, the 1896–97 airship reports were barely mentioned in Fort's works, although at that time he was writing for some of the same newspapers that were covering the airship stories and almost certainly was aware of the enormity of the 1896–97 airship wave). Discussing the Copiapó report in 2001, Loren Coleman called it an example of "reports of weird aerial constructions" on the boundary between machines and animals that "just do not make sense".

On July 29, 1880, two witnesses in Louisville, Kentucky saw a flying object described as "a man surrounded by machinery which he seemed to be working with his hands" with wings protruding from his back. Merely a month later, a similar sighting occurred in New Jersey. It was reported in The New York Times that "it was apparently a man with bat's wings and improved frog's legs... the monster waved his wings in answer to the whistle of a locomotive."

== Airship Wave of 1896–1897 ==
The best-known of the mystery airship waves began in California in 1896. Then, early in 1897, reports and accounts of similar sightings came from other areas, generally moving eastward across the country. Although the majority of witnesses reported seeing only a light or group of lights moving across the night sky, some accounts during the airship wave claim that occupants were visible on some crafts, and encounters with the pilot or crew were occasionally reported as well. These occupants often appeared to be human, though their behavior, mannerisms and clothing were sometimes reported to be unusual. Sometimes the apparent humans claimed to be from the planet Mars.

Historian Mike Dash described and summarized the 1896–1897 series of airship sightings, writing:

The general conclusion of investigators was that a considerable number of the simpler sightings were misidentification of planets and stars, and a large number of the more complex the result of hoaxes and practical jokes. A small residuum remains perplexing.

The total number of reported sightings during the 1896–97 airship wave was in the thousands; based on newspaper reports, the total number of witnesses may have exceeded 100,000.

=== California, 1896 ===
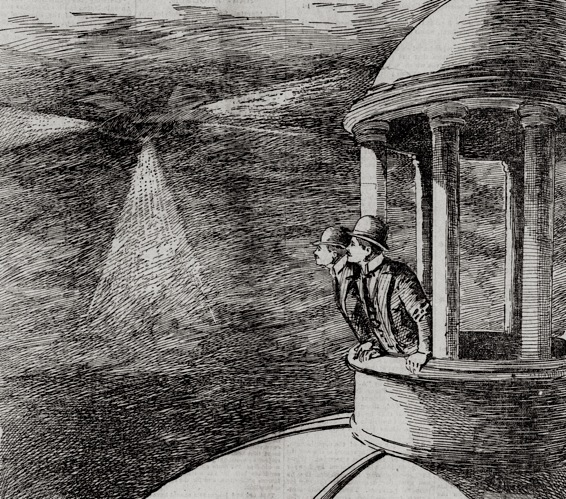
Drawing of the mystery airship observed from the dome of the California State Capitol in Sacramento, as illustrated in the San Francisco Call, November 29, 1896

The initial wave of airship sightings took place primarily in California from November 17 through December 1896, with a few isolated sightings in January 1897. There were also some reports of the airship in the Arizona Territory, Nevada, Oregon, Washington and British Columbia during November and December. Many newspaper accounts described the sightings as part of a transcontinental flight by the airship's inventor.

- A mystery light was first seen over the capital city of Sacramento on the evening of November 17, 1896. Several citizens observed a strange light moving slowly from east to west across the sky at an estimated elevation of 1,000 feet (300 m). Due to a heavy overcast that evening, very little detail could be observed; most of the several hundred witnesses reported seeing only a light source but a few said they could discern a vague, dark body behind the bright light. A witness named R.L. Lowery claimed that he heard a voice from the craft issuing commands to increase elevation to avoid hitting a church steeple. Lowery added "in what was no doubt meant as a wink to the reader" that he believed the apparent captain to be referring to the tower of a local brewery, as there were no churches nearby. Lowery further described the craft as being powered by two men exerting themselves on bicycle pedals. Above the pedaling men seemed to be a passenger compartment, which lay under the main body of the craft. A bright headlamp was mounted on the front end. Some witnesses reported the sound of talking or singing as the light passed overhead.
- The November 18, 1896, editions of local newspapers including the Sacramento Bee and the San Francisco Call all published accounts of the sighting. The newspapers ran such headlines as "A Wandering Apparition", "Claim They Saw a Flying Airship", "That Mysterious Light" "Saw the Mystic Flying Light", "Strange Craft Of the Sky" and "What Was It?"
- The November 27, 1896, edition of the Stockton, California, Evening Mail featured one of the earliest accounts of an alleged alien craft sighting. Colonel H.G. Shaw claimed that while driving his buggy through the countryside of Lodi near Stockton, he came across what appeared to be a landed spacecraft. Shaw described it as having a metallic surface which was completely featureless apart from a rudder, and pointed ends. He estimated a diameter of 25 feet (7.5 m) and said the vessel was around 150 feet (45 m) in total length. Three slender, 7-foot-tall (210 cm), apparent extraterrestrials were said to approach from the craft while "emitting a strange warbling noise." The beings examined Shaw's buggy and then tried to physically force him to accompany them back to the airship. The aliens were said to give up after realizing they lacked the physical strength to force Shaw aboard. They boarded their ship, which lifted off the ground and sped out of sight. Shaw believed that the beings were Martians sent to kidnap an earthling for unknowable but potentially nefarious purposes. This has been seen by some as an early attempt at alien abduction; it is possibly the first published account of explicitly extraterrestrial beings attempting to abduct humans and force them into their spacecraft.
- The strange light reappeared over Sacramento on the evening of November 21, 1896. Among the observers were Sacramento's deputy sheriff and district attorney. Witnesses described the light as being twice as bright as a typical arc light or locomotive headlamp. Later that evening, the light was also seen over Folsom, San Francisco, Oakland, Petaluma, Santa Rosa, Sebastopol and several other cities and was reportedly viewed by thousands of witnesses, including the domestic staff of San Francisco Mayor, Adolph Sutro. As it flew over Cliff House and Seal Rocks, the bright light reportedly frightened the sleeping seals, causing them to frantically dive into the ocean.
- On the evening of November 22, two Methodist ministers near Knights Ferry, reportedly observed a "fiery object" resting on the ground. As the two men approached the object, it suddenly took off, flying away in a shallow climb.
- The November 28, 1896, edition of the San Francisco Call reported that Professor H.B. Worcester of the Garden City Business College and his Thanksgiving dinner guests observed a flying light that he estimated was traveling between sixty and one hundred miles per hour. A farmer named John Bawl, who lived a short distance from the professor, also claimed to have seen the airship a short time later.
- On November 29, 1896, over one hundred residents of Tulare witnessed a spectacular sighting: "[They] assert they saw the now famous airship that has been wandering around in different sections of the state...It came down quite a distance, then went up and took a straight shot for Hanford. Red, white and blue lights were seen in succession, but no part of the ship was seen...many people watched it as long as it was in sight."

California cities reporting sightings during November and December, included Anderson, Auburn, Red Bluff, Redding, Arbuckle, Woodland, Yolo, Chico, Marysville, Camptonville, Grass Valley, Biggs, San Leandro, San Jose, Hayward, San Luis Obispo, Acampo, Lathrop, Livermore, Lodi, Crows Landing, Manteca, Modesto, Merced, Stockton, Turlock, Visalia, Fresno, Delano, Bakersfield, Redlands, Santa Clara, Santa Cruz, Santa Barbara, Riverside and Los Angeles.

With much public interest focused on the airship sightings, a young San Francisco attorney named George D. Collins came forward and told the newspapers that some months earlier he had been supposedly contacted by a man seeking legal advice concerning "the world's first practical airship", a craft that he claimed was near completion at a secret location near Oroville, about sixty miles from Sacramento. Collins stated that the lights seen over Sacramento must have been his client conducting nocturnal test flights before an official unveiling of his secret invention. This explanation seemed reasonable to many and was given extensive coverage in the San Francisco newspapers. After Collins' announcement, rumors and wild tales began to spread and for several weeks the "phantom airship" was the biggest news story in northern California. As sightings and reports of mystery lights continued to increase throughout the state, Attorney Collins found himself the center of so much attention and ridicule, that he came to regret his earlier bragging. Cartoons mocking Collins and the airship and depicting the attorney as a drunk and smoking an opium pipe appeared in the newspapers. The San Francisco Chronicle nicknamed him "Airship" Collins and after being hounded by reporters and harassed by cranks and curious busybodies, Collins recanted most of his claims and actually fled into hiding. Collins had hinted that a local dentist, Dr. E.H. Benjamin, was the inventor of the airship. Dr. Benjamin admitted to the newspapers that he was an inventor and Collins was his attorney, but disavowed any connection to the airship. Despite his denials, Dr. Benjamin continued to be badgered by the press and public, and like Collins, fled town and disappeared.

Around the time Collins began distancing himself from the airship, William Henry Harrison Hart, former Attorney General of the State of California, came forward and also claimed to represent the inventor of the airship. Hart gave several interviews to the San Francisco Call and his details concerning the mystery airship were even more outlandish than those of Attorney Collins. Hart stated that the airship's inventor had fired Collins for talking too much. He also claimed there were actually two airships, one built in California, the other in New Jersey and later claimed that a third "much improved" airship was under construction and when completed and tested would be used to bomb Havana, Cuba with dynamite. Hart named one of the inventors as a Dr. Catlin and his assistant as Dr. Benjamin, the dentist who denied any connection to the airship. Like Collins, Hart later changed his stories and eventually stopped talking to the newspapers about the airship. Exactly what true involvement Hart and Collins may have had in connection with the appearance of the California airship is not known.

The San Francisco Examiner, which had initially attempted to ignore the airship reports, published an editorial on December 5, 1896, by William Randolph Hearst, lashing out at the Yellow Journalism he believed had led to the airship story:

Fake journalism has a good deal to answer for, but we do not recall a more discernible exploit in that line than the persistent attempt to make the public believe that the air in this vicinity is populated with airships. It has been manifest for weeks that the whole airship story is pure myth.

The California airship wave of 1896 ended in December, but in February 1897, reports of mysterious lights seen moving about the night skies over western Nebraska marked the beginning of an even larger wave of airship sightings that would cover the greater part of the American Midwest. This second wave lasted through May 1897, with a few scattered reports of the airship in June.

=== 1897: airship moves east ===
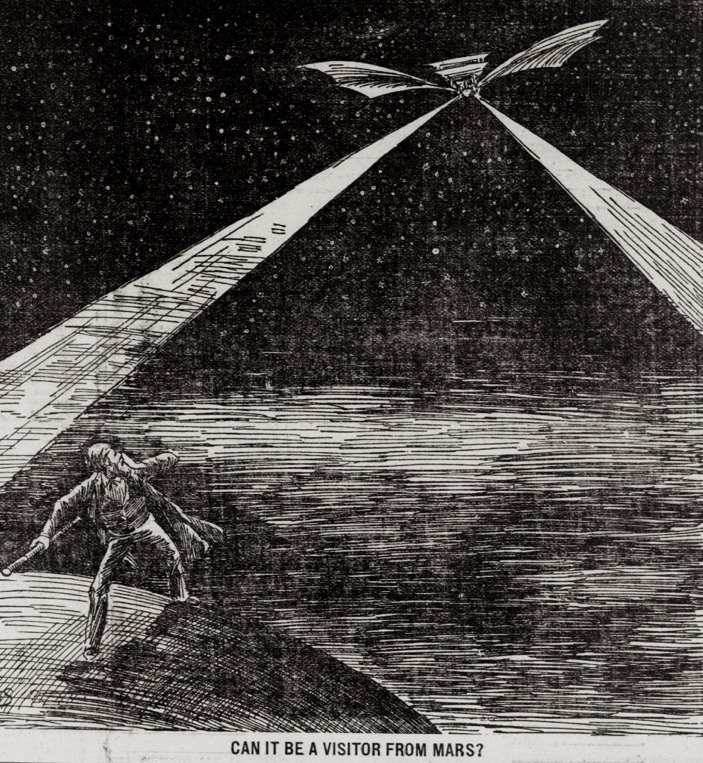
Mystery airship illustrated in The St. Paul Globe, April 13, 1897

Although many newspapers across the country published reports on the California airship sightings, the phenomenon appeared to have attracted relatively minor attention in the Midwestern and eastern states. The arrival of 1897 saw the end of the California wave, except for a few isolated sightings in mid-January.

- On February 2, 1897, the Omaha Bee reported a sighting over Hastings, Nebraska, the previous day: "Several Hastings people report that an air ship, or something of the kind, has been sailing around in the air west of this city...A close watch is being kept for its reappearance". On February 5, the Bee reported that the airship had been sighted again, near the town of Inavale, around forty miles south of Hastings.
- One witness from Arkansas – allegedly a former state senator named Harris – was supposedly told by an airship pilot (during the tensions leading up to the Spanish–American War) that the craft was bound for Cuba, to use its "Hotchkiss gun" to "kill Spaniards".
- In one account from Texas, three men reported an encounter with an airship and with "five peculiarly dressed men" who asserted that they were descendants of the lost tribes of Israel, and had learned English from the 1553 North Pole expedition led by Hugh Willoughby.
- An article in the Albion Weekly News from Albion, Nebraska, reported that two witnesses saw an airship crash just inches from where they were standing. The airship suddenly disappeared, with a man standing where the vessel had been. The airship pilot showed the men a small device that supposedly enabled him to shrink the airship small enough to store the vessel in his pocket. A rival newspaper, the Wilsonville Review, playfully claimed that its own editor was an additional witness to the incident and that he heard the pilot say "Weiver eht rof ebircsbus!" The phrase he allegedly heard is "subscribe for the Review" spelled backward.
- The March 28, 1897, edition of the Rocky Mountain News published a report of a sighting in Topeka, Kansas where several hundred people observed a "blood red light" moving slowly across the sky. Some were reportedly so frightened by the sight that they hid in their storm cellars "fearing that a great calamity was impending". Among the witnesses to the event was Governor of Kansas, John W. Leedy.
- On the evening of March 29, 1897, hundreds of witnesses saw a bright light fly over Omaha and briefly hover before disappearing to the northwest.
- In Everest, Kansas on April 1, 1897, an object, described as shaped like an Indian canoe, up to thirty feet in length and carrying a searchlight of multiple colors, was observed.
- On April 2, 1897, thousands of citizens of Kansas City saw what was described as "a mysterious black object casting before it a penetrating light." Around one hour later, the airship reappeared over Everest. The Omaha Bee described the object as looking like an elongated balloon with a boat-shaped gondola suspended beneath.
- The first airship sighting reported in Michigan was on April 10, 1897, at Alma, followed by sightings on April 11 from Benton Harbor, Holland, Niles, and Mendon. On April 12, the airship was seen over Battle Creek and Kalamazoo, Michigan, and an airborne explosion was seen in Pavilion, with alleged airship debris being found there and in nearby Comstock. The next night, a farmer living north of Battle Creek claimed that the airship came within 100 feet (30 m) of a field on their farm, and a wheel fell off the airship and was embedded in the ground. Sightings peaked around April 15 but continued into early May.
- The airship was first reported in the Chicago area when it was observed over the small city of Evanston, Illinois on the evening of April 9. The following day, the Evanston Index reported that "Five Hundred reputable citizens gazed with astonishment at the spectacle of a bright light in the heavens to the west. It was first seen at about 8:15 o'clock very low down on the horizon and had the brightness of fifty ordinary electric street lights...A great many people viewed it with opera glasses ...and were certain it was the famous airship about which so much fun has been made in the papers".
- On April 10, 1897, the St. Louis Post-Dispatch published a story reporting that one W.H. Hopkins encountered a grounded airship about 20 feet (6 m) in length and 8 feet (2.5 m) in diameter near the outskirts of Springfield, Missouri. The vehicle was apparently propelled by three large propellers and crewed by a beautiful, nude woman and a bearded man, also nude. Hopkins attempted with some difficulty to communicate with the crew to ascertain their origins. Eventually they understood what Hopkins was asking of them and they both pointed to the sky and "uttered something that sounded like the word Mars."
- In Keokuk, Iowa, the April 11 1897, edition of the Daily Gate City carried a report of an airship sighting the night before where witnesses "observed a peculiar moving light that answered the description given of the mysterious something that has caused such a furore in this state and neighboring ones...The light was observed in different parts of the city by people who had no communication with one another."
- On April 15, 1897, The Dallas Morning News reported that the airship had been seen in nearby Denton: "The mysterious airship of which so much has been said and written in the last few days, has been seen here by at least two credible persons...The airship is described as cigar-shaped with a light, moving slowly. Then it accelerated 'at a terrific rate' There was a row of windows along one side." The next day, The Dallas Morning News carried another report of the airship, this time from Corsicana, describing the airship as "a bright light a long distance from the earth and...moving at a rather fast speed across the firmament."
- An April 16, 1897, a story published by the Table Rock Argus claimed that a group of "anonymous but reliable" witnesses had seen an airship sailing overhead. The craft had many passengers. The witnesses claimed that among these passengers was a woman tied to a chair, a woman attending her, and a man with a pistol guarding their apparent prisoner. Before the witnesses thought to contact the authorities, the airship was already gone.
- Minneapolis papers carried an account of a physician from Rice Lake being abducted at gunpoint on the night of April 13 to care for the airship's captain who was suffering from influenza. After a struggle the doctor escaped by leaping from the airship into the lake forty feet (12 m) below. However, the Rice Lake Chronotype gave a more prosaic account of events, in which the doctor fell into the lake as a result of breaking through the ice while trying to cross, and not for any airship-related reason.
- An account from Aurora, Texas, related in The Dallas Morning News on April 19, 1897, reported that a couple of days before, an airship had smashed into a windmill belonging to a Judge Proctor, then crashed. The occupant was dead and mangled, but the story reported that the presumed pilot was clearly "not an inhabitant of this world." Strange "hieroglyphic" figures were seen on the wreckage, which resembled "a mixture of aluminum and silver ... it must have weighed several tons." The story ended by noting that the pilot was given a "Christian burial" in the town cemetery. The story attracted no particular attention at the time, and no other newspapers in the area reported any such funeral. The rediscovery of the story by UFO enthusiasts in the 1960s led to a short burst of investigative activity, but by the early 1970s almost all authorities considered the story a probable hoax. In 1973, aviation reporter Bill Case of the Dallas Times-Herald discovered a rough-hewn rock that he contended was the stone marker used in the burial, and which bore scratches that he contended represented the airship. A local treasure hunter claimed that his metal detector gave strange readings in the area, which Case claimed indicated that the pilot had been buried in some sort of metal uniform. However, A few months later, an investigator from the Mutual UFO Network (MUFON) reported that the headstone – and whatever metallic material might have lain beneath it – was gone.
- An account by Alexander Hamilton of Leroy, Kansas, supposedly occurred around April 19, 1897, and was published in the Yates Center Farmer's Advocate of April 23. Hamilton, his son and a hired hand witnessed an airship hovering over his cattle pen. Upon closer examination, the witnesses realized that a red "cable" from the airship had lassoed a heifer, but had also become entangled in the pen's fence. After trying unsuccessfully to free the heifer, Hamilton cut loose a portion of the fence, then "stood in amazement to see the ship, cow and all rise slowly and sail off." Some have suggested this was the earliest report of cattle mutilation. In 1977, however, UFO researcher Jerome Clark debunked this story, and confirmed via interviews and Hamilton's own affidavit that the story was a successful attempt to win a Liars' Club competition to create the most outlandish tall tale.
- From about April to June 1897 there were various reports in Travis County, Texas, in and around Austin, Manor and Webberville. One report was by boys camped on Bull Creek in view of Mount Bonnell. They claimed the airship "was in sight fully fifteen minutes and are positive they could not have been mistaken. At intervals of every few seconds it would throw its searchlights, and the boys [said] the light looked as big as four ordinary arc lights. It made its appearance from behind Mount Bonnell and traveled north."

Reports of airship sightings continued throughout the Midwest and East during May 1897 with an isolated sighting in Texas during June, which was particularly noteworthy, since witnesses reported seeing two airships, a rare occurrence during the Mystery Airship waves of 1896-97.

== Other "mystery airship" events ==
Historians such as Brett Holman and Thomas Bullard have collected press reports that show similar sightings occurred periodically at much lower levels. However, large airship events similar to the 1896-97 continued to occur. The nature of the sightings remained fairly consistent across a number of events, even as the change in technology blurred the line between airships and airplanes.

The next major wave occurred in 1909. By this time, airship technology had greatly advanced and several successfully powered airships, including zeppelins, had been built and flown. In April 1909, a brief airship scare struck Britain, possibly motivated by public fears about German zeppelin developments. This was followed by airship waves in New Zealand starting in May 1909 and Australia in August 1909. Starting in Nov 1909, a series of mystery airship sightings reported around New England were likely triggered by a hoax by Wallace Tillinghast, who falsely claimed to have invented and flown a "heavier-than-air" craft from Worcester to New York City.

Another airship scare occurred in the United Kingdom in 1912–1913 and in New Zealand/Australia in 1918.

Jerome Clark wrote that "One curious feature of the post-1897 airship waves was the failure of each to stick in historical memory. Although 1909, for example, brought a flood of sightings worldwide and attendant discussion and speculation, contemporary accounts do not allude to the hugely publicized events of little more than a decade earlier."

== Possible explanations ==
=== Hoaxes or misidentification ===
During the 1896–97 wave, there were many attempts to explain the mystery airship sightings, including suggestions of misidentified celestial objects, hoaxes, pranks, publicity stunts and hallucinations. One man suggested the nocturnal lights were actually swarms of lightning beetles; others believed observers were merely seeing meteors or bright stars and planets. A noted debunker of the airship was the astronomer Professor G.W. Hough, director of the Dearborn Observatory; he was certain people were looking at Alpha Orionis (Betelgeuse) a prominent star in the Constellation of Orion. Other astronomers believed witnesses may have mistaken Jupiter, Venus and Mars for the airship. Some of the airship reports were proven to be pranks: balloons or kites with lanterns or candles attached, launched by practical jokers.

David Michael Jacobs observed that "Most arguments against the airship idea came from individuals who assumed that the witnesses did not see what they claimed to see." However, Jacobs believes that many airship tales originated with "enterprising reporters perpetrating journalistic hoaxes." The San Francisco Call and the San Francisco Examiner both accused each other of fabricating airship stories. So-called yellow journalism was at its peak during the 1890s and many of these accounts "are easy to identify because of their tongue-in-cheek tone, and accent on the sensational." Furthermore, in many such newspaper hoaxes, the author makes his intent obvious "by saying – in the last line – that he was writing from an insane asylum (or something to that effect)".

=== Genuine airships ===
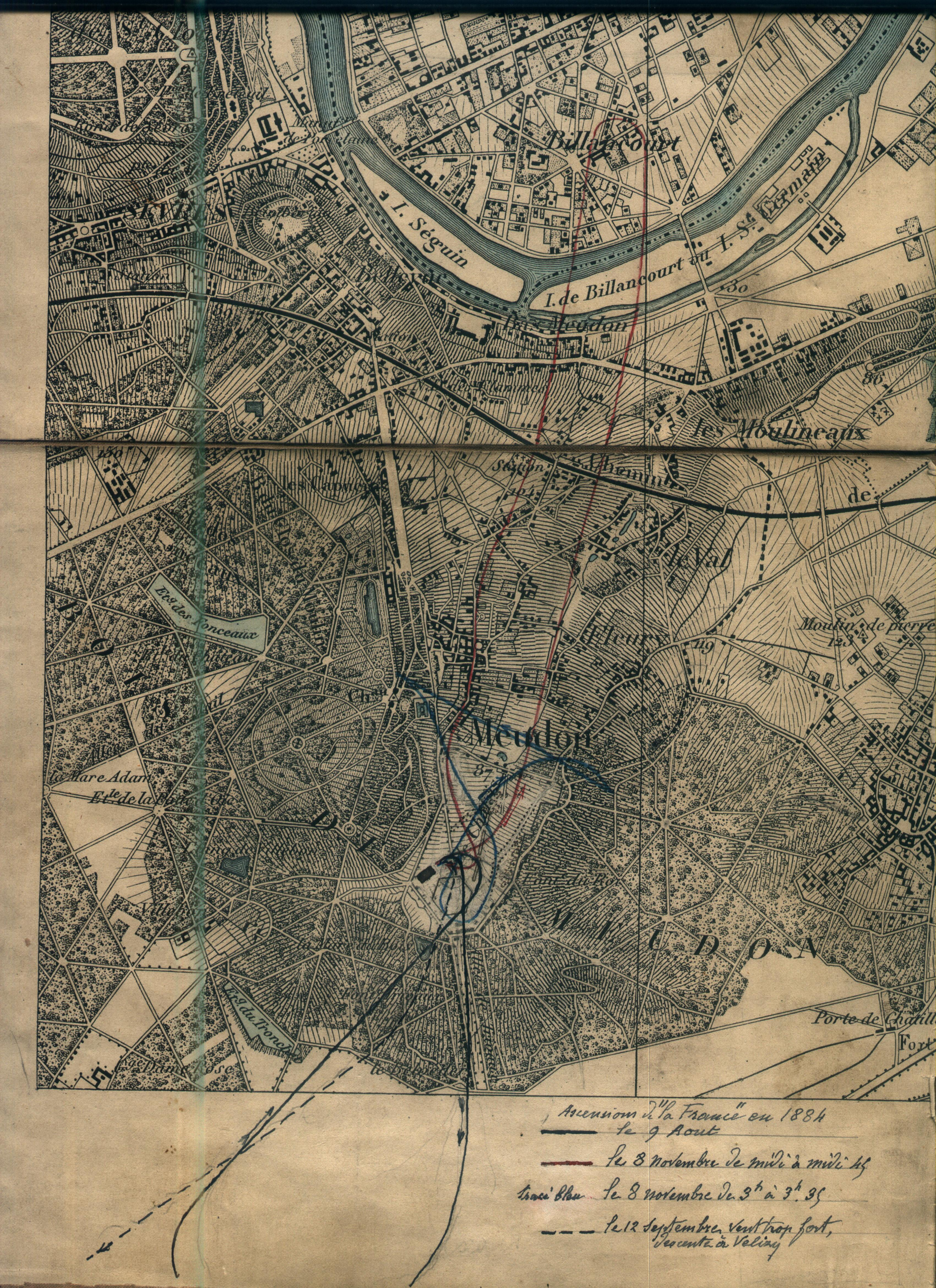
A map of Krebs & Renard's 1884 flights in La France

Some authors have argued that the mystery airship reports were genuine accounts of functional man-made airships. Steerable airships had been publicly flown in the U.S. since the Aereon in 1863, and numerous inventors were working on airship and aircraft designs. Thomas Edison was so widely speculated to be the mind behind the alleged airships that in 1897 he "was forced to issue a strongly worded statement" denying his responsibility.

Two French Army officers and engineers, Arthur Krebs and Charles Renard, had successfully flown in an electric-powered airship called La France as early as 1884. In November 1897, an aluminum-skinned airship designed by David Schwarz was built in Germany and successfully flew over Tempelhof Field.

In his 2004 book Solving the 1897 Airship Mystery, American writer Michael Busby analyzed observed flight paths and airspeeds from old newspaper accounts and found the evidence consistent with three separate airships flying in the Texas skies. Research led him to conclude they were built in Iowa by a group of people originally from California:

Three individuals investigated in this chapter may be the connecting threads between the various airship mysteries we have examined (1840s to 1897). Dr. Solomon Andrews, Willard Wilson, and Dr. Charles Smith, peers extraordinaire, may have been designing, building and flying airships from the 1840s.

He concludes one airship crashed at Aurora on April 17, 1897, another crashed off the Gulf coast a few days later, and the third perhaps flew North to New York where it also crashed at sea on May 13. Two other airships the group built in Iowa met their demise in Michigan and Washington state, respectively, and the aviators presumably died.

In The Great Airship of 1897 (2009), American writer J. Allan Danelek makes a similar case. He concludes the airship was built by an unknown individual, possibly funded by an investor from San Francisco, as a prototype for planned commercial passenger airships. Danelek demonstrates how the craft might have been built using materials and technologies available in 1896 (including speculative line drawings and technical details). The ship, he proposes, was built in secret to safeguard its design from patent infringement as well as to protect investors in case of failure.

Noting that the flights were initially seen over California and only later over the Midwest, he speculates that the inventor was making a series of short test flights, moving from west to east and following the main railway lines for logistical support, and that it was these experimental flights that formed the basis for many – though not all – of the newspaper accounts from the era. Danelek also notes that the reports ended abruptly in mid-April 1897, suggesting that the craft may have met with disaster, effectively ending the venture and permitting the sightings to fall into the realm of mythology.

=== Claims of extraterrestrial origin ===
In 1896 and 1897, the extraterrestrial hypothesis was suggested by some newspapers to account for the appearance of the airships. Two such reports, both from 1897, were printed in the Washington Times, which speculated that the airships were "a reconnoitering party from Mars"; and the St. Louis Post-Dispatch, which suggested of the airships, "these may be visitors from Mars, fearful, at the last, of invading the planet they have been seeking."

In 1909, a letter printed in the Otago Daily Times (New Zealand) suggested that the mystery airship sightings then being reported in that country were due to Martian "atomic-powered spaceships."

== See also ==
- Airship
- Flaps of flying phantoms
- Flying saucer
- Foo fighter
- Ghost rockets
- 2024 United States drone sightings
- List of reported UFO sightings
- Unidentified flying object
