= The Aurora Encounter =

1986 film directed by Jim McCullough Sr.

- Theatrical poster
- Directed by: Jim McCullough Sr.
- Written by: Melody Brooke; Jim McCullough Jr.
- Produced by: Jim McCullough, Sr.
- Starring: Jack Elam; Peter Brown; Carol Bagdasarian; Dottie West
- Cinematography: Joseph Wilcots
- Edited by: Sheri Gallow
- Music by: Ron F. Lulio
- Distributed by: New World Pictures
- Release date: March 7, 1986 (U.S.)
- Running time: 90 minutes
- Country: United States
- Language: English

The Aurora Encounter is a 1986 American Weird Western film directed by Jim McCullough Sr., written by Melody Brooke and Jim McCullough, Jr., and starring Jack Elam, Mickey Hays, Peter Brown, Carol Bagdasarian, and Dottie West. Its plot follows the residents of a small Texas town at the turn of the 19th century who are visited by an alien being after a UFO crashes in their town. The screenplay was very loosely based on the Aurora, Texas, UFO incident of 1897.

== Plot ==
In 1897 Aurora, Texas, schoolteacher Alain Peebles inherits the town's failing newspaper after her father's death. Meanwhile, a UFO appears in the woods outside the town. Late at night, local resident Irene is startled by the appearance of a short alien-looking man at her window, followed by beams of light. Alain begins to investigate Irene's story to publish it in the newspaper, which causes Irene to become a pariah in town. Shortly after, one of Alain's students, Sue Beth, witnesses the UFO near a river, as well as the extraterrestrial. He leaves behind a strange crystal, which Beth brings to Alain to examine. Meanwhile, Charlie, a local drunk, encounters the extraterrestrial, whom he senses is benevolent and invites into his home. The two drink beer together and play checkers, though the alien does not speak.

Alain's eagerness to cover the stories about the encounters frustrates Sheriff Ben, who believes it to be irresponsible journalism. Despite this, Alain travels to Austin to meet with the governor and discuss the incidents, but she is dismissed. Charlie continues to be visited by the extraterrestrial, but his claims are refuted by locals who consider his stories to be mere drunken ramblings.

Sue Beth brings her classmates, Ginger and Becky, to a native burial ground where they find various animal bones painted and arranged on sticks. The ground suddenly collapses beneath them, and the girls find themselves trapped in a cavern containing ancient artifacts, hieroglyphs, and skeletons. This terrifies the young Ginger, and the girls panic further when the cave begins to collapse on them. Meanwhile, Texas Ranger Phillip Sheraton witnesses the UFO emerging nearby from the woods, and it causes his rifle to disappear in a beam of light. Before the cave entirely collapses on them, the girls are saved by the extraterrestrial, who is summoned by the crystal and causes the girls to levitate out of the cave to safety.

After their experience, Sue Beth, Ginger, and Becky visit Alain and tell them of their experience. The next day, Phillip visits Alain and informs her he too saw the UFO. Alain arranges a public attempt at summoning the extraterrestrial in town with the crystal. The attempt is successful, and the UFO descends on the town, much to the horror of the nonbelievers. Alain, Charlie, and the young girls are elated. As the extraterrestrial exits the UFO and approaches Sue Beth, Alain, and Ben, he is shot by Phillip. The townspeople watch as he returns inside his vehicle, which subsequently crashes into the town water tower before exploding. A devastated Sue Beth removes the extraterrestrial's body from the wreckage.

A proper funeral is held for the extraterrestrial, attended by Alain, Charlie, Ben, Irene, and the girls. During the burial, Sue Beth lays the crystal atop the casket, which causes it to glisten and glow blue before it launches into the sky, disappearing in a torrent of light.

== Cast ==
- Jack Elam as Charlie Hankins
- Carol Bagdasarian as Alain Peebles
- Mickey Hays as the Aurora Alien
- George McFarland as Governor Culverson
- Mindy Smith as Sue Beth
- Peter Brown as Sheriff Ben Temple
- Charles B. Pierce as Preacher
- Dottie West as Irene
- Carly McCullough as Ginger
- Tracy Kuehnert as Becky
- Will Mitchell as Texas Ranger Phillip Sheraton

== Production ==
=== Development ===
The film was based on the Aurora, Texas, UFO incident that allegedly occurred in April 1897.

=== Casting ===
Mickey Hays, who was cast in the film in the role of the alien, suffered from progeria that gave him an unusual appearance. Director Jim McCullough, Sr. remained close with Hays after the production until Hays's death at age 20 in 1992. The Make A Wish Foundation helped in the casting of Hays, whose wish was to be in a Hollywood movie.

=== Filming ===
The film was shot in Ferris, Texas.

== Release ==
=== Critical response ===
Jim Williams of the Santa Clarita Signal likened the film to a "low-budget E.T. Goes West."

=== Home media ===
Anchor Bay Entertainment issued a DVD edition of the film on June 24, 2003.

== Legacy ==
A long sample of Elam's dialogue regarding "Dr. Neptune's delicious elixir" was used in hip hop artist DJ Shadow's acclaimed 1996 album Endtroducing..... and also the track "Chromium", produced by the artist Chrome and released on Platipus Records.

== See also ==
- Aurora, Texas, UFO incident
