= Aurora, Texas, UFO incident =

Alleged UFO crash in 1897

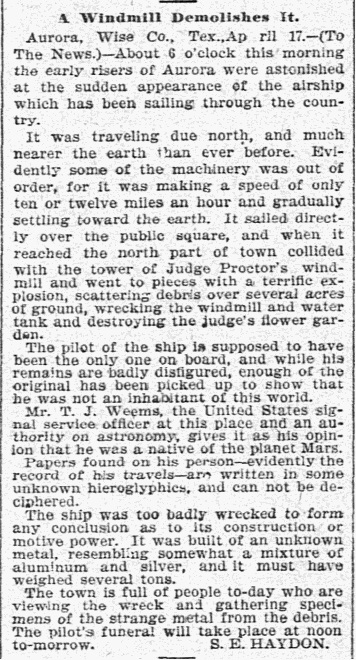
Original newspaper article describing the incident, by S. E. Haydon, "A Windmill Demolishes It," The Dallas Morning News, April 17, 1897, p. 5.

The Aurora, Texas, UFO incident reportedly occurred on April 17, 1897, when, according to locals, a UFO crashed on a farm near Aurora, Texas. The incident, similar to the more famous Roswell UFO incident 50 years later, is claimed to have resulted in the fatality of the pilot. The pilot was "not of this world" and was said to be an alien. The corpse was buried at the Aurora cemetery. A stone was placed as a marker for the grave, but has since been removed.

== The incident as reported ==
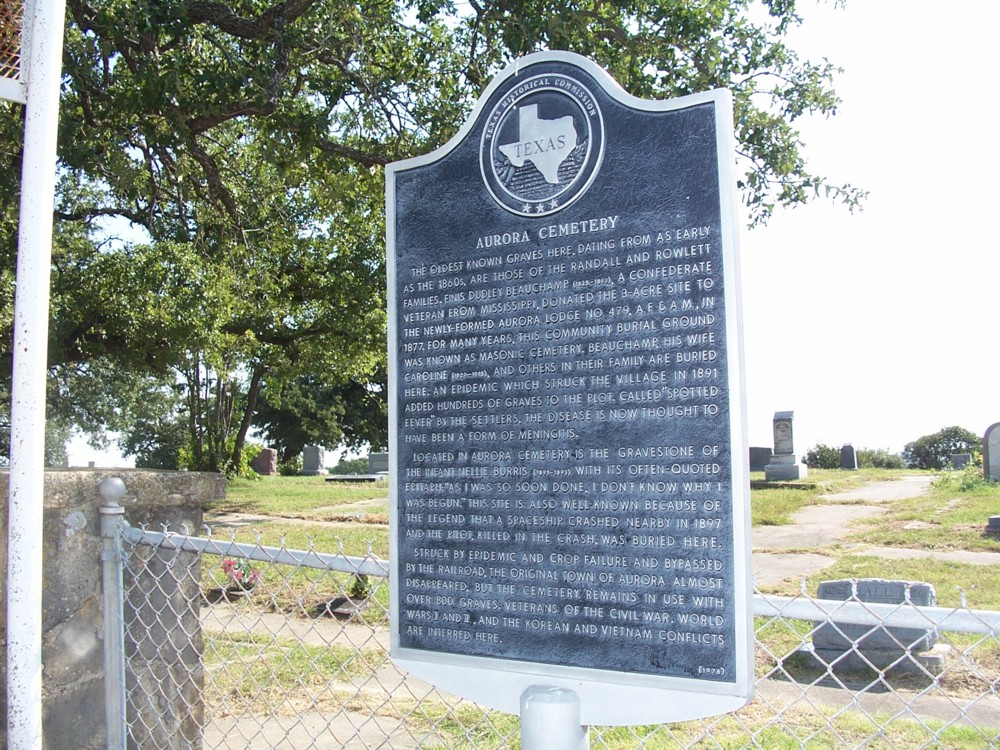
A Texas Historical Commission marker outside the Aurora Cemetery, alleged burial site of the UFO pilot, which briefly mentions the incident.

On April 17, 1897, an article in the Dallas Morning News written by S. E. Haydon (Note: Haydon's surname is also referenced as "Hayden" in other accounts.) described the UFO crash. The UFO was said to have hit a windmill on the property of a Judge J. S. Proctor two days earlier at around 6:00 am local time, resulting in its crash. The pilot, who was reported to have been "not of this world" and speculated to have been a native of "Mars" according to a reported Army Signal Service officer named T. J. Weems from nearby Fort Worth, did not survive the crash and was buried "with Christian rites" at the nearby Aurora Cemetery. The cemetery contains a Texas Historical Commission marker mentioning the incident.

Reportedly, wreckage from the crash site was dumped into a nearby well located under the damaged windmill, while some ended up with the pilot's body in the grave. Adding to the mystery was the story of Mr. Brawley Oates, who purchased Judge Proctor's property around 1935. Oates cleaned out the debris from the well in order to use it as a water source, but later developed an extremely severe case of arthritis, which he claimed to be the result of contaminated water from the wreckage dumped into the well. As a result, Oates sealed up the well with a concrete slab and placed an outbuilding atop the slab. According to writing on the slab, this was done in 1957.

== Hoax theory ==
Location of Aurora, near Dallas, Texas

The hoax theory is primarily based on a 1980 Time magazine interview with Etta Pegues, an 86-year-old Aurora resident who claimed that Haydon had fabricated the entire story; she stated that Haydon "wrote it as a joke and to bring interest to Aurora. The railroad bypassed us, and the town was dying."

== Investigations ==
The incident has been investigated on numerous occasions. One report was broadcast by local television station KDFW FOX 4 and two other reports aired on cable television.

=== KDFW report ===
In 1998, Dallas-based TV station KDFW aired a lengthy report about the Aurora incident. Reporter Richard Ray interviewed former Fort Worth Star Telegram reporter Jim Marrs and other locals, who said something crashed in Aurora. However, Ray's report was unable to find conclusive evidence of extraterrestrial life or technology. Ray reported that the State of Texas erected a historical plaque in town that outlines the tale and labels it a "legend".

=== UFO Files investigation ===
On December 19, 2005, UFO Files first aired an episode related to this incident, titled "Texas' Roswell". The episode featured a 1973 investigation led by Bill Case, an aviation writer for the Dallas Times Herald (Note: The MUFON case file lists Case as a writer for the Herald; however, the episode erroneously mentions him as a Morning News writer.) and the Texas state director of the Mutual UFO Network (MUFON).

MUFON uncovered two new eyewitnesses to the crash. Mary Evans, who was 15 at the time, described how her parents visited the crash site and also recounted that an alleged alien body was discovered. Evans' parents had forbidden her from going. Charlie Stephens, who was age 10, recounted how he saw the airship trailing smoke as it headed north toward Aurora. He wanted to see what happened, but his father made him finish his chores. He claimed that his father went to town the next day and observed wreckage from the crash.

MUFON then investigated the Aurora Cemetery and uncovered a grave marker that appeared to show a flying saucer of some sort. Their metal detector also returned positive readings. MUFON asked for permission to exhume the site, but the cemetery association declined permission. After the MUFON investigation, the marker mysteriously disappeared from the cemetery and a three-inch pipe was placed into the ground; MUFON's metal detector no longer picked up readings from the grave, and it was presumed that the metal had been removed.

MUFON's report eventually stated that the evidence was inconclusive, but did not rule out the possibility of a hoax. The episode featured an interview with Mayor Brammer, who discussed the town's tragic history.

=== UFO Hunters investigation ===
On November 19, 2008, UFO Hunters premiered another television documentary regarding the Aurora incident, titled "First Contact".

The documentary featured one notable change from the UFO Files story. Brawley Oates's grandson Tim Oates, now-owner of the property with the sealed well where the UFO wreckage was purportedly buried, allowed the investigators to unseal the well in order to examine it for possible debris. Despite tests indicating that the well water had a significant concentration of aluminum, it otherwise tested normal and contained no sign of substantial debris. It was stated in the episode that any large pieces of metal had been removed from the well by a past owner of the property. Further, the remains of a windmill base were found near the well site, which allegedly refuted Ms. Pegues' statements from the 1979 Time magazine article that Judge Proctor never had a windmill on his property.

In addition, the Aurora Cemetery was again examined. Although the cemetery association still did not permit exhumation, using ground-penetrating radar and photos from prior visits, an unmarked grave was found in the area near other 1890s graves. However, the condition of the grave was badly deteriorated, and the radar could not conclusively prove what type of remains existed.

The land owner gave them pieces of metal that contained mostly aluminum and an unknown element.

== In popular culture ==
The incident is dramatized in the 1986 film The Aurora Encounter, as well as being discussed within the History Channel's Ancient Aliens third-season premiere (entitled Aliens and the Old West) that focuses on late 19th-century UFO sightings in western North America.

An independent short movie co-written and co-directed by musician and historian Thomas Negovan and Aaron Shaps, Aurora, dramatizes the incident and combines it with the Nazi conspiracy theory of Die Glocke.

The incident is satirized in The Firesign Theatre's 1974 comedy LP Everything You Know Is Wrong, performed from about 3:00 to 4:42 on Side A.

== See also ==
- UFO sightings in the United States
- List of reported UFO sightings
- Mystery airship
