= Jim McCullough Sr. =

American film director (1928–2012)

- Born: May 12, 1928; Mansfield, Louisiana, U.S.
- Died: April 6, 2012 (aged 83); Shreveport, Louisiana, U.S.
- Education: University of California, Los Angeles
- Occupations: Film director, screenwriter, producer
- Years active: 1974–1997

James McCullough Sr. (May 12, 1928 – April 6, 2012) was an American film director and producer who wrote and directed several horror films in the 1980s.

== Early life ==
McCullough was born in Mansfield, Louisiana, and raised in Lebanon, Missouri.

== Career ==
He formed Jim McCullough Productions after graduating from the University of California, Los Angeles. While a student, he appeared in CBS's live-action Playhouse 90 Theater. In 1974, he co-produced Where the Red Fern Grows (1974). Prior to establishing his film company, McCullough had two minor acting credits in Teenage Monster (1958) and The Love Bug (1971).

His directorial debut was Charge of the Model T's (1977), followed by the horror film Mountaintop Motel Massacre (1983), and the science-fiction film The Aurora Encounter (1986). His last directorial credit was 1994's The St. Tammany Miracle, which he co-directed with Joy N. Houck Jr.

== Personal life ==
McCullough had two children: James Jr., and Cathy, with his wife Lel.

== Filmography ==
Year	Title	Notes
1964	"The Shepherd of the Hills (1964 film)"	Producer
1974	Where the Red Fern Grows	Associate producer
1976	Creature from Black Lake	Producer
1977	Charge of the Model T's	Director and producer
1981	Soggy Bottom, U.S.A.	Associate producer
1983	Mountaintop Motel Massacre	Director, writer, and producer
1986	The Aurora Encounter	Director and producer
1988	Video Murders	Director and producer
1994	The St. Tammany Miracle	Director and producer
1997	Renfroe's Christmas	Producer
1999	Nacho Chihuahua	Director and producer

Acting credits:

Year	Title	Role	Notes
1958	Teenage Monster	Jim Cannon	
1968	The Love Bug	Driver #27	(final film role)
