= Charge of the Model T's =

1977 film by Jim McCullough Sr.

- Theatrical poster
- Directed by: Jim McCullough Sr.
- Screenplay by: Jim McCullough Jr.
- Based on: Charge of the model T's (novel) by Lee Somerville
- Produced by: Jim McCullough Sr.; William Lewis Ryder
- Starring: John David Carson; Carol Bagdasarian; Louis Nye; Herb Edelman; Arte Johnson; John Doucette
- Cinematography: Dean Cundey
- Edited by: Robert Gordon
- Music by: Euel Box
- Production company: Jim McCullough Productions
- Distributed by: Rye-Mac Film Distribution
- Release date: November 4, 1977 (Lakeland, Florida)
- Running time: 90 minutes
- Country: United States
- Language: English

Charge of the Model T's is a 1977 American comedy spy film directed by Jim McCullough Sr. with the screenplay by Jim McCullough Jr. based upon the novel of the same name by Lee Somerville. Starring John David Carson, Carol Bagdasarian, Louis Nye, Herb Edelman, and Arte Johnson.

The final film of vaudevillian and actor George Mann, the project was shot on locations in Texas and in the Wichita Mountains region of Oklahoma near Lawton and Cache, and was distributed by MGM.

The film had both theatrical and television airings and, paired with The Switch, was released on DVD by VCI Entertainment on March 13, 2007.

== Plot ==
During World War I, the Germans try to disrupt American war efforts by encouraging Mexican guerrillas to destabilize the Texas border with Mexico. Masterminding the German plot is spy Friedrich Schmidt. As the border become disrupted, Friedrich drives into the United States at the wheel of the high-speed secret weapon: the "RX4", a Ford Model T equipped with armor and weaponry and tricked out with a powerful motor. US Army Lieutenant Matthew Jones pursues Schmidt with a fleet of special trackers.

== Principal cast ==
- John David Carson as Lt. Matthew Jones
- Carol Bagdasarian as Coral Adams
- Louis Nye as Friedrich Schmidt
- Herb Edelman as Villa Nueva
- Arte Johnson as Doc Bailey
- John Doucette as Capt. Mundy
- Louisa Moritz as Hilda
- Terry Wilson as Stonewall Adams
- Pedro Gonzalez Gonzalez as Sanchez
- George Mann as Rancher
- Jim McCullough Jr. as Pvt. Hansen
- Bill Thurman as Sgt. Bond
- Marged Wakeley as Martha Adams
- Roy Tatum as Juan
- John P. Fertitta as Little Cloud
- Lloyd Slagle as Dutch Braun
- Robert Hulley as Sheriff
- Lou Schilling as Blacksmith

== Reception ==
The Evening Independent panned the film, making note that as the film was a "dull contrivance", G-rated did not stand for "good".
