= John David Carson =

American actor (1952–2009)

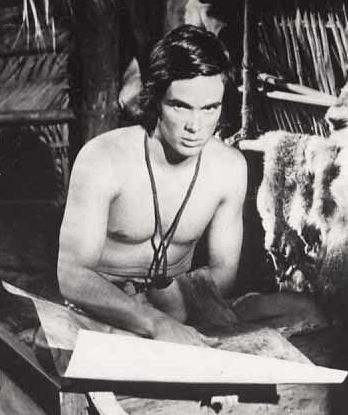
- Carson in The Savage is Loose (1974)
- Born: John Franklin Carson; March 6, 1952; Los Angeles, California, U.S.
- Died: October 27, 2009 (aged 57); Las Vegas, Nevada, U.S.
- Occupation: Actor
- Years active: 1966–1990

John David Carson (born John Franklin Carson; March 6, 1952 – October 27, 2009) was an American actor known for his work in film and television. Born in Los Angeles, California, he began his career as a voice actor for Hanna-Barbera cartoons, including Space Ghost (1966–1968). He transitioned to live-action roles, making his film debut in Pretty Maids All in a Row (1971). Carson appeared in a variety of projects, such as Stay Hungry (1976), Empire of the Ants (1977), and TV shows like Hawaii Five-O and Charlie's Angels. He retired after his role in Pretty Woman (1990) and died in 2009 at the age of 57.

== Career ==
Carson began his career at a young age, acting in television advertisements, and later doing cartoon voice-acting for Hanna-Barbera. His first job was the voice of "Dino Boy/Todd" in 18 episodes of Space Ghost from 1966-1968, billed as Johnny Carson. He attended Los Angeles Valley College where he played a lead role in its 1969 production of The Taming Of The Shrew. Upon beginning his Hollywood career he was immediately engaged in a dispute with Johnny Carson over the use of their shared name - he subsequently went by the name John David Carson.

Carson's first feature film was Pretty Maids All in a Row in 1971. Carson portrayed "Ponce de Leon Harper", a nerdy and sexually inexperienced young man who is tormented with lust at the pretty young women around him at school and suffers from chronic priapism. Ponce is eventually "mentored" by his guidance counselor, played by Rock Hudson, an expert at seducing younger women, who takes him under his wing and persuades an attractive female teacher (played by Angie Dickinson) to sleep with him. Another notable role was in the 1976 film Stay Hungry, alongside Arnold Schwarzenegger, Jeff Bridges and Sally Field. Carson also appeared in a great deal of television productions, including Hawaii Five-O and Charlie's Angels. He portrayed "Jay Spence" on Falcon Crest, a prime-time soap opera.

He played "Larry Burns", a television repairman who is briefly framed for a woman's murder by a corrupt sheriff on Murder, She Wrote and an Irish jockey named "Kevin Ryan" on Charlie's Angels. He appeared in various B-movies such as Empire of the Ants (1977), an adaptation of an H. G. Wells story about gigantic, man-eating ants, Creature from Black Lake (1976), Charge of the Model T's (1977) and The Fifth Floor (1978), and acted alongside George C. Scott in The Day of the Dolphin (1973). He again appeared opposite Scott, playing his character's son, in The Savage is Loose (1974). Carson continued acting in small parts until 1990, appearing in the Julia Roberts hit Pretty Woman, which marked his last appearance on film.

== Personal life ==
Carson's entry into Hollywood was influenced by his background in theater. Born on March 6, 1952, in Los Angeles, California, at the now-closed Queen of Angels Hospital, he was the son of Western actor Eldridge "Kit" Carson (1909–1978) and fashion model Rosemonde (née James) Carson.

In his youth, Carson was involved in a serious motorcycle accident that left him nearly completely deaf in one ear, an experience he discussed in Interview magazine.

Carson married Vicki Morgan on January 10, 1976; the couple divorced the following year. His second marriage, to Colette Trygg, ended in divorce on May 7, 1993. He married his third wife, Diana, a mother of two daughters, on February 5, 2007. Carson died from lymphoma on October 27, 2009, at the age of 57. He was survived by his wife, Diana, and two stepdaughters.

== Filmography ==
Year	Title	Role	Notes
1971	Pretty Maids All in a Row	Ponce	
1972	Call Her Mom	Woody	
1972	Room 222	Craig Evans	Episode: Where is it Written
1973	The Day of the Dolphin	Larry	
1974	The Savage is Loose	David / Son	
1976	Creature from Black Lake	Rives	
1976	Stay Hungry	Halsey	
1977	Empire of the Ants	Joe Morrison	
1977	Charge of the Model T's	Lt. Matt Jones	
1978	The Fifth Floor	Ronnie Denton	
1986	Blacke's Magic	Billy Maddox	Episode: Address Unknown
1990	Pretty Woman	Mark Roth	(final film role)
