= Anna Chappell =

Canadian-American actress

- Born: Anna Oksanen; September 15, 1925; Finland
- Died: July 31, 2005 (aged 79); Appleton, Wisconsin, U.S.
- Occupation: Actress
- Spouse: Harry Chappell (m. 1946; died 1981)
- Children: 2

Anna Chappell (née Oksanen; September 15, 1925 – July 31, 2005) was a Canadian-American actress. She appeared in two feature films: Mountaintop Motel Massacre (1983) and The Man in the Moon (1991), and was a longtime resident of Shreveport, Louisiana, where she was a prolific theater actress.

== Biography ==
Chappell was born Anna Oksanen in 1925 to Finnish parents Carl and Aino Oksanen. Although born in Finland, Chappell relocated to Toronto, Canada in her early childhood. Both her parents were actors. Chappell was raised in Toronto, where she became interested in theater at a young age. As a child, she sang with the Canadian Navy entertainment corps.

She met her husband, American musician Harry Chappell, while working as a singer. The couple married in Binghamton, New York in 1946, and relocated to Shreveport, Louisiana in the mid-1950s; there, Chappell became active in local theater. She appeared as Lady Thiang in a production of The King and I, which toured in Corning, New York in 1959. In 1970, Chappell earned critical acclaim for her performance in Mame at the Marjorie Lyons Playhouse in Shreveport. For her performance, she was awarded a Best Actress award from The Shreveport Times.

Chappell's husband, Harry, who ran a music store in Shreveport, died on March 31, 1981. In 1983, she starred as Mme. Danzard in a production of My Sister in this House at the Kennedy Center, directed by Robert Buseick. The same year, she made her feature film debut in the slasher film Mountaintop Motel Massacre, playing an unhinged woman who begins murdering guests in the hotel she operates. Terry Lawson of the Dayton Daily News praised her performance as being handled with "a comic intensity." She later had a supporting role in Robert Mulligan's drama film The Man in the Moon (1991).

== Death ==
In the spring of 2005, Chappell relocated from Shreveport to live with her daughter in Appleton, Wisconsin. She died two months later in Appleton on July 31, 2005. A memorial service for Chappell was arranged in Shreveport.

== Filmography ==
Year	Title	Role	Notes	Ref.
1983	Mountaintop Motel Massacre	Evelyn		
1991	The Man in the Moon	Mrs. Taylor		

== Select stage credits ==
- The King and I (1959)
- Peter Pan (1960)
- Mame (1970)
