= The Million Dollar Duck =

1971 film by Vincent McEveety

- Theatrical release poster by Ward Kimball and Ted Berman
- Directed by: Vincent McEveety
- Screenplay by: Roswell Rogers
- Story by: Ted Key
- Produced by: Bill Anderson
- Starring: Dean Jones; Sandy Duncan; Joe Flynn; Tony Roberts; James Gregory; Lee Montgomery
- Cinematography: William E. Snyder
- Edited by: Lloyd L. Richardson
- Music by: Buddy Baker
- Production company: Walt Disney Productions
- Distributed by: Buena Vista Distribution
- Release date: June 30, 1971
- Running time: 92 minutes
- Country: United States
- Language: English
- Box office: $5.1 million (North America) (rentals)

The Million Dollar Duck (also titled as $1,000,000 Duck) is a 1971 American comedy film produced by Walt Disney Productions based on the goose that lays golden eggs scenario. It was directed by Vincent McEveety, and stars Dean Jones, Sandy Duncan and Joe Flynn. The film was released on June 30, 1971, and received negative reviews from critics.

== Plot ==
Albert Dooley (Dean Jones) is a scientist who struggles to pay the bills, in contrast to a flashback where he was the college valedictorian and told he would go far in life. His wife, Katie (Sandy Duncan) gets a recipe for applesauce wrong and gives it to her husband to take to work for lunch, hoping it will help cut down on the budget. In a humorous chain reaction, the duck that Albert is testing steals the applesauce after Albert has thrown it away in the trash and then wanders into a radiation lab and becomes irradiated. Albert is ordered to get rid of the duck, so he figures he can give it to his son, Jimmy (Lee Montgomery) who has been wanting a pet, only to discover it now lays eggs with solid gold yolks.

In a Pavlovian manner, the duck, named "Charley" (despite being female), lays an egg when prompted by the barking of a dog. At first, the only ones who know of Charley's golden yolks are Albert, Katie, Jimmy and Albert's friend, Fred, but as they sell the yolks of gold, they gain the attention of a suspicious neighbor, Mr. Hooper (Joe Flynn), a government bureaucrat from the U.S. Treasury Department. Hooper spies on the Dooleys in a haphazard manner, often suffering mishaps such as falling off a tree branch after being yelled at by his wife to leave the neighbors alone. However, Hooper sees a golden yolk laid firsthand, with Fred and Albert celebrating.

Hooper warns his boss Rutledge (James Gregory) about the economic upheaval that an "easy" supply of gold could create in the world. Although Rutledge doesn't believe Hooper at first, a series of nationwide phone calls among politicians spreads rumors, culminating in Rutledge getting a phone call from President Nixon ordering him to capture the duck. Albert becomes greedy and no longer cares for his son, which saddens Jimmy. The Treasury Department officials (with Mr. Hooper) soon arrive at the house and order the family to turn over the duck. Jimmy, watching from upstairs, climbs out the window with Charley and then rides off with a couple of teenage boys and their hot rod as the government officials try to seize Charley.

Jimmy is then suspended on a ladder between two parking garages and Albert attempts to convince his son to grab his hand before the ladder falls. Jimmy tells his dad to go away, believing he only wants to save Charley, but when the ladder begins to break, he grows fearful and realizes that his dad is there to help. Right before the ladder falls, Albert saves Jimmy. Immediately afterwards, Albert is arrested for owning gold as a private citizen. The family ends up in court and the judge breaks an egg into a glass after Mr. Hooper (unsuccessfully) and then Albert (successfully) barks at the duck to prompt the laying of the egg, which surprisingly turns out to be an ordinary egg yolk, as the effects of the radiation had worn off. The judge dismisses the charges, as there is no proof of the duck laying golden eggs, and Albert tells the family that the golden duck was nice while it lasted, but at least they can keep the duck for their pet, now realizing that his family is more important than wealth. The judge remarks to Jimmy, "If that duck ever lays another golden egg...bury it quick!"

== Cast ==
- Dean Jones as Albert Dooley
- Sandy Duncan as Katie Dooley
- Joe Flynn as Finley Hooper
- Tony Roberts as Fred Hines
- James Gregory as Rutledge
- Lee Harcourt Montgomery as Jimmy Dooley
- Jack Kruschen as Doctor Gottlieb
- Virginia Vincent as Eunice Hooper
- Jack Bender as Arvin Wadlow
- Billy Bowles as Orlo Wadlow
- Sammy Jackson as Frisby
- Arthur Hunnicutt as Mr. Purdham
- Frank Wilcox as Bank Manager
- Bryan O'Byrne as Bank Teller
- Ted Jordan as Mr. Forbes
- Bing Russell as Mr. Smith
- Peter Renaday as Mr. Beckert
- Frank Cady as Assayer
- George O'Hanlon as Parking Attendant
- Jonathan Daly as Carter
- Hal Smith as Courthouse Guard
- Edward Andrews as Morgan

== Production ==
Open auditions were held for the role of the duck. The lucky winner was Webfoot Waddle at the Disney studio. The stand-in ducks were played by the runner-ups Jennifer and Carlos.

== Reception ==
The Million Dollar Duck was one of three films that film critic Gene Siskel walked out on during his professional career, the other two being the 1980 horror film Maniac and the 1996 comedy film Black Sheep. Roger Ebert described the film as "one of the most profoundly stupid movies I've ever seen". Scott Weinberg of DVD Talk criticised the depiction of Duncan's character, stating "Sandy Duncan...is asked to play a housewife who's easily as stupid as a stone. Throughout the entire flick she's about two steps up from mental retardation. And this stuff is played for laughs!" He also called Million Dollar Duck "easily one of the Disney studio's very worst live-action family comedies. Ever". Revisionist critics have been less harsh on the film, understanding its targeted appeal was to children and getting into the spirit of the essential silliness of the premise of an extremely valuable duck. Despite poor reviews for the film, the comedic acting was appreciated at the time of its release with both Sandy Duncan and Dean Jones being nominated for Golden Globes for their performances. The film also marked the motion picture debut of Tony Roberts, who received solid reviews for his performance.

On Rotten Tomatoes, the film has an approval rating of 17% rating based on 6 reviews and an average rating of 3.5/10. On Metacritic the film has a weighted average score of 45 out of 100, based on 4 critics, indicating "mixed or average reviews".

== Release ==
It was released on video in 1986. It was released on DVD on April 12, 2005.

== See also ==
- List of American films of 1971
