= Creature from Black Lake =

1976 film by Joy N. Houck, Jr.

- Theatrical release poster
- Directed by: Joy N. Houck Jr.
- Screenplay by: Joy N. Houck Jr.
- Produced by: Jim McCullough Jr.; Jim McCullough Sr.
- Starring: Jack Elam; Dub Taylor; Dennis Fimple; John David Carson; Bill Thurman
- Cinematography: Dean Cundey
- Edited by: Robert Gordon
- Music by: Jaime Mendoza-Nava
- Production company: Jim McCullough Productions
- Distributed by: Howco International Pictures
- Release date: March 12, 1976
- Running time: 91 minutes (Note: Some prints of the film run 91 minutes in length, though a 95-minute version was released on home video.)
- Country: United States
- Language: English

Creature from Black Lake is a 1976 American horror film written and directed by Joy N. Houck Jr. and starring Jack Elam, Dub Taylor, Dennis Fimple, John David Carson, and Bill Thurman. It follows two anthropology students from the University of Chicago who attempt to document the Fouke Monster, a Bigfoot-like creature who is said to torment a small Louisiana community.

The film was one of the earliest projects of cinematographer Dean Cundey, who went on to work as a frequent collaborator of John Carpenter's, serving as the cinematographer of his films Halloween (1978), The Fog (1980), and The Thing (1982).

== Plot ==
After hearing a lecture on unknown, humanoid creatures such as Bigfoot and the Fouke Monster, two University of Chicago students, Pahoo and Rives, decide to spend their spring break pursuing the story and journey from Chicago to the Louisiana-Arkansas border. There they begin interviewing witnesses, first a family that suffered a car crash when the creature menaced them on the road, killing the parents of a young child, Orville Bridges.

Pahoo and Rives stay with Orville and his grandparents, who are reluctant to speak with them, fearing they will portray them as superstitious rednecks, but soon take a liking to the students. Grandpaw Bridges regales them with stories about encounters with the creature, including one in which he witnessed it viciously murdering his pet dog. Late in the night at the family's rural farm, the household is awoken by sinister, guttural screams coming from the woods, which Pahoo and Rives are quick to attempt documenting with a tape recorder.

At a local diner, the men meet two local women, Becky and Michelle, who take an obvious liking to them. The men invite them to come visit their campsite that evening in the nearby state park. Shortly after the women arrive, the group are attacked by the creature, who begins stalking them outside their tent during a rainstorm. Moments later, Sheriff Carter, Becky's father, storms into the tent, ordering the girls to leave before arresting Pahoo and Rives and holding them in the county jail.

Meanwhile, local Joe Canton, whom the students previously encountered, is accosted by the creature in his backwoods shack. He defends himself against it with a rifle. When he stumbles into the police station raving about the creature, Carter dismisses Canton as a raving drunk, and also keeps him overnight in the holding cell with Pahoo and Rives. Canton recounts to the men his first encounter with the creature from years prior, when it pulled his friend and fellow fisherman, Willy, into the lake, killing him.

At dawn, the men are freed on the condition that Pahoo and Rives leave town. Instead, they defy the sheriff's orders and accompany Canton back to his home to learn more about his encounters with the creature. Canton directs the men to a remote area deep in the swamp, where he encountered the creature's tracks. That night, the men explore the swamp, and Pahoo is viciously attacked by the creature while Rives waits in their van. The creature raids the men's campsite before Rives radios the local police for help. Moments later, the creature attacks the van, forcing it to tumble down a slope with Rives inside. Rives attempts to shoot the creature before the van explodes into flames. Rives flees into the swamp, where he locates the injured Pahoo, who falls into a coma.

Carter arrives at the scene with Canton, who agrees to help. At dawn, they locate Rives, along with Pahoo, who is on the verge of death. They are taken to the hospital, where Pahoo is treated for critical injuries. When Rives pleads at Pahoo's bedside for his survival, Pahoo suddenly regains consciousness. He jokes with Rives that, though he is injured and in pain, he is only regretful that the men will have to restart their project.

== Cast ==
- Jack Elam as Joe Canton
- Dub Taylor as Grandpaw Bridges
- Dennis Fimple as Pahoo
- John David Carson as Rives
- Bill Thurman as Sheriff Billy Carter
- Evelyn Hindricks as Grandma Bridges
- Jim McCullough Jr. as Orville Bridges
  - Chase Tatum as young Orville
- Roger Pancake as H. B.
- Roy Tatum as Fred/Creature

== Release ==
The film premiered in Shreveport, Louisiana on March 12, 1976.

=== Critical response ===
TV Guide awarded the film one out of four stars, writing, "Despite its obvious handicaps, this ultra-low-budget Bigfoot movie--a subgenre that always seem to suffer from a lack of production funds--is fairly watchable." Terror Trap.com gave the film three out of four stars, calling it " an above average creature feature". George R. Reis from DVD Drive-in gave the film a negative review, calling it "dull and talky". Brett H. from Oh, the Horror! criticizing the film's screenplay, which lacked any sense of action or suspense.

=== Home media ===
Creature from Black Lake was released for the first time on DVD by Boulevard on July 5, 2005. It was later released by Tango Entertainment on May 4, 2006. 2015 saw the film's release by VFN and Education 2000 on July 10, and July 16 respectively.

Synapse Films released the film on DVD and Blu-ray featuring a restored print on December 13, 2022.

== See also ==
- The Legend of Boggy Creek, 1972 film

== Sources ==
- Young, R. G., ed. (2000). The Encyclopedia of Fantastic Film: Ali Baba to Zombies. New York City, New York: Applause Books. ISBN 978-1-557-83269-6.
