= The Savage Is Loose =

1974 film directed by George C. Scott

- Theatrical release poster
- Directed by: George C. Scott
- Written by: Max Ehrlich; Frank De Felitta
- Produced by: George C. Scott
- Starring: George C. Scott; Trish Van Devere; John David Carson; Lee H. Montgomery
- Cinematography: Álex Phillips Jr.
- Edited by: Michael Kahn
- Music by: Gil Mellé
- Production companies: Campbell Devon Productions; The Savage Is Loose Company
- Distributed by: Campbell Devon Films
- Release date: October 30, 1974 (Los Angeles)
- Running time: 114 minutes
- Countries: Mexico; United States
- Language: English

The Savage Is Loose is a 1974 American drama film produced and directed by George C. Scott. It stars Scott, Trish Van Devere, John David Carson and Lee H. Montgomery.

== Plot ==
In 1902, John, his wife Maida and their infant son David are the only survivors of a ship that crashes into the rocky beach of an uncharted island during a violent storm. By 1912, David, now a seemingly happy 12-year-old boy, begins to enter puberty. By the time he is 17, David is consumed by lust for his mother, which drives a wedge between him and his father to the point where they hunt each other down for the affections of the only woman on the island.

== Cast ==
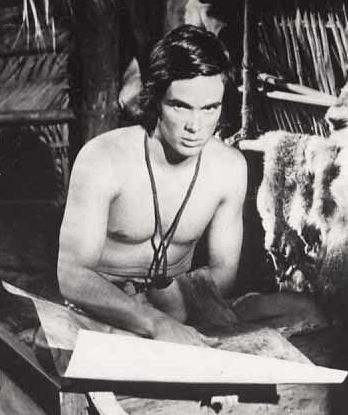
John David Carson in The Savage Is Loose

- George C. Scott as John
- Trish Van Devere as Maida
- John David Carson as David
  - Lee H. Montgomery as Young David

== Production ==
The film was photographed entirely on location south of Puerto Vallarta, Mexico. It was produced by Campbell Devon Productions and distributed by George C. Scott through WCII on video (now out of print).

== Rating controversy and distribution ==
When the MPAA gave the film an "R" rating, Scott blasted the decision and urged exhibitors to defy it by running the movie unrated. Scott strongly disagreed with the MPAA's position that incest was a "major" theme of the film and said he was "appalled" that his movie was given the same rating as films like Candy Stripe Nurses and The Texas Chain Saw Massacre. Scott took out full-page newspaper ads in key cities offering a "money-back guarantee" from his own personal funds to any parent who took a child under 17 to the film and agreed with the R rating. Less than $10,000 was reportedly paid to patrons who accepted the offer.

The film was sold directly to regional exhibitors by sales executives, bypassing traditional distribution channels.

== Reception ==
Reviews from critics were largely negative. Vincent Canby of The New York Times wrote, "What begins as a kind of tab show version of 'The Swiss Family Robinson' quickly disintegrates into a muddled meditation upon the survival of the human race, but under conditions so special that the film's primal concerns eventually become ludicrous." Gene Siskel of the Chicago Tribune gave the film 1.5 stars out of 4 and called it "a pretentious potboiler" with characters that have "no identity other than sex-starved or sex-threatened." He ranked it behind only The Trial of Billy Jack on his year-end list of the worst films of 1974. Arthur D. Murphy of Variety wrote that "Scott and associates have done a first class job in making this film. All four performances are excellent, and Scott's direction (after the 'Rage' debacle) is in complete control." Pauline Kael of The New Yorker wrote that the film "crawls by in slightly under two hours, but they're about as agonizing as any two hours I've ever spent at the movies ... Scott has to take the rap for his crapehanger's direction and for not knowing better than to buy this script, but the scriptwriters, Max Ehrlich and Frank De Felitta, really ought to have their names inscribed in a special hall of infamy." Tom Milne of The Monthly Film Bulletin wrote, "The performances are sound enough, but it is difficult to feel much conviction when Trish Van Devere sports the same daintily besmirched white nightie throughout the eighteen odd years covered by the action, and when the jungle boy still moves and talks like a sullen Californian beach bum." Leonard Maltin's film guide gave its lowest rating of BOMB.
