= Wallace Tillinghast =

Wallace Tillinghast was a Worcester, Massachusetts businessman, and the originator of an airplane hoax in the early 1900s.

== History ==
In 1909, Tillinghast announced the creation of a "marvelous aeroplane." He explained that he had done more than one hundred flights with this machine, always under cover of darkness, since two months prior to his announcement. His first flight, he claimed, had been between Worcester, Massachusetts, and New York City, New York, a distance of approximately 300 miles, where Tillinghast and his crew claimed to have circled the Statue of Liberty at 4,000 feet. At one point, the engines were said to have shut off, and the contraption glided through the air for forty-eight minutes while the mechanics made repairs. After which, they made their way back to Worcester, by way of a route taking them through Boston.

== Sightings ==
Between December 12, 1909, and February 1910, New England newspapers were filled with "sightings" of the aircraft purportedly designed by Tillinghast and two unnamed mechanics. A sighting over Worcester, Massachusetts on the night of December 22 was reported nationwide. The sighting followed claims by inventor Wallace Tillinghast that he had invented an airplane that could fly 120 miles per hour.

The author H. P. Lovecraft witnessed a mass sighting of Tillinghast in Providence, Rhode Island on December 24, 1909. While the crowds of people on the street believed they were viewing Tillinghast's airship, Lovecraft identified the object as the planet Venus.

Tillinghast never offered his craft for public viewing or inspection, and the media grew more skeptical, explaining the sightings were more likely fire balloons or the planet Venus.

In March 1910, a brief item in Popular Mechanics alleged that at least the later sightings were due to a practical joke by local hoaxsters: "Jokers had tied lanterns to owls and released them for several nights after the original yarn about the aeroplane was sprung."

== Sources ==
- Whalen, Stephen and Robert E. Bartholomew. "The Great New England Airship Hoax of 1909". The New England Quarterly , Vol. 75, No. 3 (September, 2002), pp. 466–476. doi:10.2307/1559788
