= Lee Montgomery =

Canadian actor (born 1961)

- Born: Elliott Harcourt Montgomery; November 3, 1961 (age 64); Winnipeg, Manitoba, Canada
- Occupation: Actor
- Years active: 1971–1988 (acting)

Elliott Harcourt Montgomery (born November 3, 1961), known as Lee Montgomery, is a Canadian former actor based in the United States. He is best known for his role as a lonely little boy who befriends a pack of killer rats in the film Ben (1972), as Karen Black's son Davey in the cult classic Burnt Offerings (1976), and as Sarah Jessica Parker's hunky dance partner, Jeff Malene, in Girls Just Want to Have Fun (1985).

== Hollywood ==
Brother of actresses Belinda Montgomery and Tannis G. Montgomery, and the son of actor Cecil Montgomery, Lee began his career as a model before venturing into the acting business. He made his debut in the Disney film The Million Dollar Duck in 1971, before landing a starring role in Ben (1972), the sequel to Willard (1971). He played Billy Baker in Baker's Hawk (1976).

Montgomery played a dying boy in the Academy Award-nominated film Pete 'n' Tillie (1972). He made appearances on television series such as The Mod Squad; Columbo; The Streets of San Francisco; Kojak; Adam-12; Emergency!; Marcus Welby, M.D.; and The Mary Tyler Moore Show. He acted in the infamous incest-themed film called The Savage Is Loose (1974), and in the cult horror film Burnt Offerings (1976).

In the 1980s, Montgomery made more cameo appearances in television shows such as CHiPs, Family Ties, Hotel, Fame, and Dallas, and he made a transition to adult roles in films such as Split Image (1982), Night Shadows (aka Mutant) (1984) and Into the Fire (1988). One of his best known later roles was as Phil Grenville in The Midnight Hour (1985). He also played Jeff Malene in the teen comedy Girls Just Want to Have Fun (1985), where he engages in a notable dance scene with co-star Sarah Jessica Parker. He appeared in a CBS Schoolbreak Special called "Hear Me Cry" (1984).

== After Hollywood ==
Since dropping out of the limelight, Montgomery pursued other interests, such as music-related projects. He composed the soundtrack for the film Trigon: The Legend of Pelgidium (2000). Montgomery completely disappeared from public view for more than 20 years. At least part of that time, he was working for a marketing firm. Montgomery resurfaced around 2012, appearing at Monster-Mania Con 25 in 2016 and other horror-themed conventions, signing photos and posing for pictures with fans.

As of March 2019, Montgomery is working as a full-time professional real estate agent in Solvang, California.

== Selected filmography ==
- 1971: The Million Dollar Duck .... James "Jimmy" Dooley (first film role)
- 1972: Pete 'n' Tillie.......Robbie Seltzer
- 1972: Ben .... Daniel "Danny" Garrison
- 1973: Runaway! (TV movie) .... Mark Shedd
- 1974: Columbo: Mind Over Mayhem (TV movie) .... Steve Spelberg
- 1974: The Savage Is Loose .... Young David
- 1974: Adam-12 (TV Series, 2 Episodes) ....Greg Whitney
- 1976: Burnt Offerings .... David 'Davey' Rolf
- 1976: Baker's Hawk .... Billy Baker
- 1977: Dead of Night (TV movie) .... Bobby
- 1978: True Grit: A Further Adventure (TV movie) .... Daniel Sumner
- 1982: The Six of Us (TV movie) .... Sam Benjamin
- 1982: Split Image .... Walter
- 1983: Hotel (TV series) .... Eric Stevens
- 1984: Dallas (TV series) .... Jerry Hunter
- 1984: Mutant .... Mike Cameron
- 1985: Prime Risk .... Michael Fox
- 1985: Girls Just Want to Have Fun .... Jeff Malene
- 1985: The Midnight Hour (TV movie) .... Phil Grenville
- 1987: Into the Fire .... Wade Burnett (released May 12, 1987).
- 1987: The Kid (S2E10 August 18, 1987) of Night Heat .... Tony Santini (final film role).

== Bibliography ==
- Holmstrom, John. The Moving Picture Boy: An International Encyclopaedia from 1895 to 1995. Norwich, Michael Russell, 1996, p. 336-337.
