= Prime Risk =

- Directed by: Michael Farkas
- Written by: Michael Farkas
- Produced by: Herman Grigsby
- Starring: Lee Montgomery; Toni Hudson; Sam Bottoms; Clu Gulager; Keenan Wynn; Lois Hall
- Cinematography: Mac Ahlberg
- Edited by: Bruce Green
- Music by: Phil Marshall
- Distributed by: Almi Pictures
- Release date: April 1985
- Running time: 98 min.
- Country: United States
- Language: English

Prime Risk is a 1985 thriller film directed by Michael Farkas and starring Lee Montgomery and Toni Hudson.

== Plot summary ==
A female engineer, with the assistance of her pilot-wannabe male friend, discovers a way to rip off automated teller machines, but in doing so stumbles upon a plot to destroy the U.S. monetary system.

== Cast ==
- Lee Montgomery as Michael Fox
- Toni Hudson as Julie Collins
- Sam Bottoms as Bill Yeoman (as Samuel Bottoms)
- Clu Gulager as Paul Minsky
- Keenan Wynn as Dr. Lasser
- Lois Hall as Dr. Holt
- Rick Rakowski as John
- John Lykes as Vance
- James O'Connell as Terry Franklin
- Randy Pearlman as Ed Harrington
- Timothy Rice as Albert Fishburn
- Roy Stuart as Mr. Fox
- Helen Duffy as Mrs. Fox
- Christopher Murphy as Tony Nelson
- Caron Tate as Bank Teller
- Cathey Paine as Mall Administrator
- Art Scholl as Flight Instructor
- Rick Warner as Flight Desk Attendant
- Biff Yeager as Policeman #1
- Tony Roque as Policeman #2
- Dale Stein as EMC Receptionist
- Bruce Elliott as Bank Assistant
- Michael Willis as Teller Serviceman
- Carol Bennett as Account's Secretary
- Dick Valentine as Teller Line Customer
- Carey Scott as Teller Line Kid
- Bruce Myers as Parking Lot Teen
- James Reed as Party Guest #1
- Gary E. Barlough as Party Guest #2
- Steve Belin as Spy Technician
- Leigh Drake as Spy Security Officer
- Dean Noble as Spy Pilot
- Doug Roberts as Pilot on Taxiway
- Erica Todd as FBI Receprionist
- Dick Spangler as News Anchorman
- Brown Cardwell as Field Reporter
- Ron Lombard as TV Viewer
- Tony Clay as Sweep Team Leader
- Patricia McPherson as Federal Reserve Executive
- Mark DeFrain as Federal Reserve Assistant
- Greg McCullough as Gardener #1
- David Seal as Gardener #2

== Reception and impact ==
In a 2017 interview, Hudson commented that she only briefly gave a thought about the film's correlation to the Great Recession.
