= Into the Fire (1988 film) =

- Theatrical release poster by Drew Struzan
- Directed by: Graeme Campbell
- Written by: Jess Ballard
- Produced by: Nicolas Stiliadis
- Starring: Susan Anspach; Art Hindle; Olivia d'Abo
- Cinematography: Rhett Morita
- Edited by: Marvin Lawrence
- Music by: Andy Thompson
- Distributed by: Moviestore Entertainment
- Release date: May 12, 1987 (France)
- Running time: 88 minutes
- Countries: Canada; United States
- Language: English

Into the Fire, also known as The Legend of Wolf Lodge, is a 1987 thriller film about a man who takes a job at a mysterious road-side lodge. The film was directed by Graeme Campbell, and stars Susan Anspach, Art Hindle, and Olivia d'Abo. It was first shown at the Cannes Film Festival May 12, 1987.

Film locations include the historic Mackenzie Inn, Kirkfield, Ontario, and Head Lake, Ontario.

== Cast ==
- Susan Anspach as Rosalind Winfield
- Art Hindle as Dirk Winfield
- Olivia d'Abo as Liette
- Lee Montgomery as Wade Burnett
- Maureen McRae as Vivian
- Steve Pernie as Policeman
- John Dondertman as Jimmy
- Alice O'Neil as Liette's Mother
- Bill Norman as Liette's Father
