= Mickey Hays =

American actor (1972-1992)

- Hays as he appears in The Aurora Encounter (1986)
- Born: Mickey James Hays; June 30, 1972; Longview, Texas, U.S.
- Died: June 30, 1992 (aged 20); Longview, Texas, U.S.

Mickey Hays (June 30, 1972 – June 30, 1992) was an American actor with progeria, a rare genetic condition whose symptoms resemble accelerated aging. He starred in the 1986 Weird Western science fiction film The Aurora Encounter, where he portrayed an alien who visits Earth. After the filming, Hays remained close friends with fellow cast member Jack Elam and appeared in the 1987 documentary about congenital conditions I Am Not a Freak. He died on his 20th birthday.
