= Mountaintop Motel Massacre =

- Original poster
- Directed by: Jim McCullough Sr.
- Written by: Jim McCullough Sr.
- Produced by: Jim McCullough Sr.
- Starring: Bill Thurman; Anna Chappell; Will Mitchell; Amy Hill
- Cinematography: Joseph M. Wilcots
- Edited by: Mindy Daucus
- Music by: Ron Di Iulio
- Distributed by: New World Pictures
- Release dates: July 15, 1983 (Opelousas, Louisiana); December 14, 1984 (Jackson, Mississippi)
- Running time: 95 minutes
- Country: United States
- Language: English

Mountaintop Motel Massacre (Note: The film's original title was Mountaintop Motel, and it screened under this name as well as Horrors at Mountaintop Motel when it was shown in Opelousas, Louisiana, and Jackson, Mississippi, in 1983 and 1984, respectively. It was eventually retitled Mountaintop Motel Massacre after New World Pictures acquired it and gave it a wide theatrical release in 1986.) is a 1983 American psychological slasher film written and directed by Jim McCullough Sr. and starring Anna Chappell, Bill Thurman, and Amy Hill. The plot concerns a psychotic elderly woman who, after being freed from incarceration, returns to the motel she ran and begins murdering the guests.

Filmed in 1982 in Shreveport, Louisiana, the film was first independently released in the southern United States under the title Mountaintop Motel. In 1985, New World Pictures acquired theatrical distribution rights, and its ending was reshot to feature additional onscreen gore. New World Pictures released the film theatrically as Mountaintop Motel Massacre in March 1986. Although the film received negative critical reception upon its theatrical release, it has, in later years, been noted for its offbeat atmosphere, and has been referred to as an "early 1980s drive-in gem."

== Plot ==
In rural Louisiana in 1981, Evelyn, who has recently been released from a psychiatric institution, finds her daughter Lorie practicing witchcraft in their basement. This causes her to have a mental breakdown, and she stabs Lorie to death. She convinces the authorities that she had nothing to do with her daughter's death, though suspicion looms over her. Adjacent to her home is the Mountaintop Motel, a group of outdoor cabins that Evelyn rented out as motel rooms prior to her institutionalization.

One morning, Reverend Bill McWiley arrives at the property and rents one of the rooms. Shortly after, a man named Robin Crewshaw arrives and also takes a room; the two men converse about the rundown state of the cabins and share a drink. Meanwhile, newlyweds Vernon and Mary pass through on a road trip and rent a cabin. At nightfall on the nearby highway, cousins Prissy and Tanya have their car breakdown en route to Nashville and are picked up by Al, a lascivious man who pretends to be a record producer in hopes of bedding both of the women. They also arrive at the motel, finding driving conditions unsafe due to a torrential rainstorm.

Mary is getting ready for bed in the bathroom when Vernon is bitten by a snake that Evelyn planted in the room. Mary attempts to use the phone, but it does not work. She rushes outside to the front office. Al, who is coming out of the front office, offers to use his car phone to call the police for the couple, hoping to get an ambulance. Meanwhile, the various guests have trouble sleeping in their rooms: Reverend McWiley, passed out from drinking, is awoken by rats crawling on his bed, and Crewshaw awakens to cockroaches crawling on his body. Back in her room, Mary nurses Vernon, who grows progressively ill.

Meanwhile, Al attempts to initiate sex with Tanya and Prissy, but the girls lock themselves in the bathroom and argue over his claims of being a record producer. Tanya tells Prissy she is willing to sleep with him if it will result in a record deal, and she begins to have sex with Al while Prissy remains in the bathroom. Evelyn enters the bathroom through a trapdoor in the floor connected to a network of tunnels and slashes Prissy's throat with a sickle. Startled by the noise, Tanya opens the bathroom door and finds the room covered in blood, but Prissy is gone. Al notifies Mary and Crewshaw of Prissy's disappearance. Crenshaw notifies the Reverend, who tells Crenshaw he is going to get ready and then come to Crenshaw's cabin. Before he can do that, Evelyn stabs the sickle through his chest. Crewshaw inadvertently uncovers the trapdoor in the bathroom; with Al, they attempt to locate Evelyn but find her absent from the main office. Meanwhile, Evelyn breaches Mary and Vernon's room; with the sickle, she impales Mary through the face and then slashes Vernon's throat as he lies helplessly in the bed. Al and Crewshaw hear the commotion outside and find the bodies in the room while Evelyn retreats into the tunnels via a trapdoor.

Al and Crewshaw descend into the tunnels below while Tanya locks herself inside the car. Crewshaw is attacked by Evelyn, who chops off his hand before slashing his throat. Meanwhile, a sheriff finally arrives at the motel from Al's earlier call, and Tanya informs him of the murders. The sheriff descends into the tunnels and discovers the Reverend's body. He is confronted by Evelyn, who attacks him in a manic state; she attempts to wrest the sickle from a wooden post where it is hanging but dislodges a beam holding the ceiling; it collapses, and the sickle hurls at Evelyn's throat, killing her.

At dawn, Al and Tanya leave with the sheriff in his car. As they drive out of the property, an apparition of Evelyn's daughter Lorie observes them from the woods. As they pull onto the main road, the vacancy sign lights up.

== Cast ==
- Anna Chappell as Evelyn
- Bill Thurman as Reverend Bill McWiley
- Will Mitchell as Al
- Virginia Loridans as Tanya
- Major Brock as Crewshaw
- James Bradford as Sheriff
- Amy Hill as Prissy
- Marian Jones as Mary
- Gregg Brazzel as Vernon
- Jill King as Lorie

== Production ==
=== Filming ===
The film was originally titled Mountaintop Motel, and was shot in the fall of 1982 in Caddo Parish and Shreveport, Louisiana. (Note: The film's credits thank the Shreveport, Louisiana fire department as well as Caddo Parish.) The location used for the motel was in fact a dilapidated and abandoned fishing camp near Cross Lake in Shreveport. The interiors of the cabins had to be repainted and redressed prior to shooting, while the underground tunnel sequences were filmed above-ground in makeshift sets that were built and covered by visqueen in order to keep light out.

=== Post-production ===
After the film was acquired by New World Pictures in 1985, reshoots were undertaken by the studio's executive Roger Corman, who felt the final sequence in which Evelyn is killed was not violent enough to appease audiences. The production design was forced to rebuild a section of the underground tunnel set, and retool the sequence, which has Evelyn die from a near decapitation when a support beam collapses on her.

== Release ==
=== Distribution ===
The film was independently released by director Jim McCullough Sr., opening in Opelousas, Louisiana on July 15, 1983 under its original title Mountaintop Motel. It was released again in Jackson, Mississippi under the title Horrors at Mountaintop Motel on December 14, 1984.

In 1985, the film was acquired for distribution by New World Pictures, who retitled it Mountaintop Motel Massacre and recut the film with a newly-shot ending. This version of the film premiered on March 14, 1986 Under New World's distribution, it would later show at theaters in New York City in May and June 1986.

=== Critical response ===
Nina Darnton of The New York Times gave the film a negative review, calling it a "slice-and-dice film for people who like to see movies where actors pretend to carve up, mutilate, disfigure, terrify and kill one another, but it will even disappoint them. The story is too silly, the murders too predictable and unimaginative, the blood too phony and the acting too much on the level of a bad high school play to send so much as a shiver down anyone's spine." TV Guide's review of the film was largely negative, comparing the gore effects to those of Herschell Gordon Lewis, and writing: "The filmmakers do have some sense of visual style, but a slasher film is a slasher film no matter how good it looks."

The New York Daily News wrote of the film: "Evelyn and the title site's assortment of snakes, rats and roaches keep the doomed cast of mostly amateur thesps awake, but this [is a] soporific one-set wonder ... The chief "vacancy" here, we're afraid, resides between the McCulloughs' ears." Terry Lawson of the Dayton Daily News referred to it as a "by-the-numbers slasher film ... that borders on parody."

In his book Creature Features: The Science Fiction, Fantasy, and Horror Movie Guide, film critic John Stanley awarded the film one out of four stars, suggesting the film is derivative of Psycho. Film scholar Brian Albright referred to the film as a "surprisingly fun and creepy backwoods flick," adding: "While it was marketed as a slasher film, Mountaintop Motel Massacre is actually a pseudo-supernatural thriller with some good scares and gore effects."

=== Home media ===
The film was released on VHS in August 1986. Anchor Bay Entertainment released it on DVD in May 2001. The DVD eventually went out of print, and the film was largely unavailable until being re-issued by Image Entertainment's "Midnight Madness" series in September 2011. The film was released on Blu-ray in the United Kingdom by 88 Films on February 1, 2017. On May 24, 2019, the film was released on DVD and Blu-ray in North America by Vinegar Syndrome, featuring a new 2K scan of the original vault materials.

== See also ==
- List of horror films of 1983

== Sources ==
- Albright, Brian (2012). Regional Horror Films, 1958-1990: A State-by-State Guide with Interviews. McFarland. ISBN 978-0-786-47227-7.
- Stanley, John (2000). Creature Features: The Science Fiction, Fantasy, and Horror Movie Guide. Berkley Boulevard Books. ISBN 978-0-425-17517-0.
- Stine, Scott Aaron (2003). The Gorehound's Guide to Splatter Films of the 1980s. McFarland. ISBN 978-1-476-61132-7.
