= Rekeying =

Replacement of lock pins to allow usage of a new key

Rekeying a lock is replacing the old lock pins with new lock pins.

== History ==
Rekeying was first invented in 1836 by Solomon Andrews, a New Jersey locksmith. His lock had adjustable tumblers and keys, allowing the owner to rekey it at any time. Later in the 1850s, inventors Andrews and Newell patented removable tumblers which could be taken apart and scrambled. The keys had bits that were interchangeable, matching varying tumbler configurations. This arrangement later became the basis for combination locks.

== Why is rekeying needed ==
Locks are usually re keyed to build master-key systems, make a set of locks share a common key, or to eliminate compromised keys. Sometimes worn pins are replaced with new pins if the old pins become too short to reach the shear-line. The shear-line is the thin line shared by the lock plug and its cylindrical housing. If a pin sits flush with the circumference of the plug it will allow lock rotation. Lock cylinders use different length pins in different combinations to create relatively unique key bitting. Most keys have 5 cuts from bow to tip. If a key has 5 cuts, the lock has 5 pins. Different brand locks each vary in many small ways, this is most true when servicing them. Many manufacturers offer product-specific manuals. Information disclosed in manufacturer manuals is often otherwise difficult to find, as is locksmith material in general.

== Pin sets and sizes ==
Pins are manufactured and numbered in the thousandths of an inch, based on the length of the pin. Typical sizes are .0025" (two and a half thousandths), .003" (three thousandths), .005" (five thousandths), or 0.010" (ten thousandths). A ten thousandths pin kit is rarely sold. Lock manufacturers each use specific depth and spacing allowing organized master-key systems to be complex, large, and manageable. A standard pin kit offers the exact size variety needed. Using manufacturer depths permits easy keying, but often you must deviate slightly for optimum accuracy. Pin kits provide master- wafers, top- pins, and springs for a thorough cylinder rebuild. Replace any worn parts, rekey, lubricate, and reassemble. Check to see that the keys work well, check remaining customer keys if any and reinstall.

== Rekeying process ==
To rekey a lock you have to first remove the lock cylinder from any housing it rests in. The lock cylinder must be disassembled, and the plug removed. Use a plug follower to avoid dropping master-wafers, top pins and springs. The plug has cylindrical chambers spaced according to manufacturer specifications. Pins are contained in these chambers where they are pushed down by springs or raised by a key. Each cut sits under a chamber of its own, each pin sits on a cut of its own. Place the correct pins in each chamber, bringing the top of each new pin flush with the shear-line. Check the upper chambers using a master-follower for old unused master wafers and remove any. If any springs are noticeably weak or the lock was especially dirty replace the springs. If the old pins are rounded from use or otherwise show excessive wear replace springs. Reinsert the plug taking care not to drop top pins into any unused chamber. Test key, make slight adjustments if needed and reassemble.

== Alternatives ==
There are some systems, like InstaKey, that allow locks to be rekeyed by inserting and turning a specially designed key without removing cores or lock hardware.
