= Baker's Hawk =

1976 film

- Theatrical release poster
- Directed by: Lyman D. Dayton
- Written by: Dan Greer; Hal Harrison Jr.
- Produced by: Lyman D. Dayton
- Starring: Clint Walker; Burl Ives; Diane Baker; Lee H. Montgomery; Alan Young
- Cinematography: Bernie Abramson
- Edited by: Parkie Singh
- Music by: Lex de Azevedo
- Production companies: Doty-Dayton Production; Baker's Hawk Ltd.
- Distributed by: Doty-Dayton Releasing
- Release date: December 22, 1976
- Running time: 98 minutes
- Country: United States
- Language: English
- Budget: $1.3 million

Baker's Hawk is a 1976 American Western film directed by Lyman D. Dayton and starring Clint Walker, Burl Ives, Diane Baker, Lee H. Montgomery and Alan Young. It is based on the 1974 novel of the same name by Jack Bickham.

== Plot summary ==
During the summer of 1876, 12-year-old Billy Baker finds an injured baby hawk and subsequently befriends an old hermit in hopes that he can heal the injured bird. Because the old man shares his remote mountain homestead with various sick or injured animals in need of attention, many of the townspeople have labelled him as "crazy". When the townspeople start assuming that he and certain other newcomers are a threat to the safety of the community, they begin an effort to oust these tramps.

In an attempt to prevent the vigilantes from getting out of control, Billy's father, Dan Baker, is persuaded by the local sheriff to volunteer as a temporary unpaid deputy, and Billy makes some important discoveries about prejudice, responsibility, courage and friendship.

== Cast ==
- Clint Walker as Dan Baker
- Burl Ives as Mr. McGraw
- Diane Baker as Jenny Baker
- Lee H. Montgomery as Billy Baker
- Alan Young as Mr. Paul Carson
- Bruce M. Fischer as Blacksmith
- Cam Clarke as Morrie Carson
- Danny Bonaduce as Robertson

== Production and release ==
Baker's Hawk began four weeks of location shooting in the mountains of Provo, Utah on July 19, 1976 and production continued in Burbank, California.

The film was released in 300 movie theaters across the United States and Canada on December 22, 1976.
