= Joy N. Houck Jr. =

American screenwriter

- Born: January 26, 1942; New Orleans, Louisiana, United States
- Died: October 1, 2003 (aged 61); Prescott, Arizona, United States
- Occupation(s): Film director, actor, screenwriter

Joy Newton Houck Jr. (January 26, 1942 – October 1, 2003) was an American actor, screenwriter and film director who is probably best known for Creature from Black Lake, one of the many Bigfoot horror films of the 1970s.

His father, Joy Newton Houck Sr., founded Howco—a production and distribution company for low-budget films.

== Filmography ==
=== Director ===
Year	Title	Role	Notes
1969	Women and Bloody Terror		
1969	Night of Bloody Horror		
1972	The Brain Machine		
1975	Night of the Strangler		
1976	Creature from Black Lake		
1994	The St. Tammy Miracle		

=== Actor ===
Year	Title	Role	Notes
1964	The Shepherd of the Hills	Ollie Stewart	
1974	Bootleggers	Bobby Joe Woodall	
1976	Creature from Black Lake	Prof. Burch	
1977	The Shadow of Chikara	Half Moon O'Brian	
1984	Tightrope	Swap Meet Owner	
1986	Down by Law	Detective Mandino	
1986	The Big Easy	Sgt. Guerra	
1987	The Hidden	DeVries' Neighbor	
1991	Doublecrossed	Turks DEA	TV movie
