= Achilles Rizzoli =

American novelist

Achilles Gildo Rizzoli (1896–1981), anonymous during his lifetime, has since his death become celebrated as an outsider artist. He is an unusual example of an "outsider" artist who had considerable formal training in drawing.

Born in Point Reyes, California, Rizzoli lived in San Francisco, where he was employed as an architectural draftsman. In the 1930s he showed his work in exhibits held in his home, which he called the Achilles Tectonic Exhibit Portfolio (A.T.E.P.) After his death, a group of elaborate drawings came to light, many in the form of maps and architectural renderings that described an imaginary world exposition (much of which was designated "Y.T.T.E.", for "Yield To Total Elation"). The drawings include "portraits" of his mother (whom he lived with until her death in 1937) and neighborhood children "symbolically sketched" in the form of fanciful neo-baroque buildings.

Rizzoli published one novel, The Colonnade (1931), under the pseudonym Peter Metermaid.

A film was made about his life and work, called Yield to Total Elation: The Life and Art of Achilles Rizzoli.
