= Chuck Patterson =

American actor

- Born: February 11, 1945; Memphis, Tennessee, U.S.
- Died: December 23, 2013 (aged 68); New York City, New York, U.S.
- Occupations: Actor, director
- Years active: 1972–2006
- Spouse: Cori Thomas

Chuck Patterson (February 11, 1945 – December 23, 2013) was an American actor and director, whose career spanned more than three decades.

== Early life ==
Born in Memphis, Tennessee.

== Career ==
Patterson began his acting career in 1972 and appeared in film, television and stage roles. He is best known for his role in the 1991 film The Five Heartbeats and other roles.

== Personal life ==
Patterson was married twice. His second wife was playwright Cori Thomas. He had a stepdaughter, author Natasha Díaz, who is the daughter of Thomas.

He died December 23, 2013, aged 68, of sudden heart failure. He lived in the Harlem neighborhood of New York City, New York, at the time of his death.
