= Gerald R. Butters =

Gerald R. Butters Jr. (born 1948) is a professor of history at Aurora University and an author who has written about film history including censorship and African American cinema.

He gave a presentation on black women in the films of Oscar Micheaux. He has written articles in Literature/Film Quarterly and the Journal of Multimedia History. In 2019 he gave a speech on the Civil War and Historical Memory. C-SPAN aired footage of him at the Printers Row Lit Fest in 2022. He has written articles for Flow Journal.

Daniel Bernardi reviewed his book on Black Manhood in early American films. It was also reviewed by Shawn St. Jean. Whitney Strub reviewed his book on film censorship in Kansas. His book on the Chicago Loop "combines historical fact with lively personal accounts," according to a NewCityLit review.

== Books ==
- Black Manhood on the Silent Screen University of Kansas Press (2002)
- Banned in Kansas: Motion Picture Censorship, 1915-1966 (2007)
- From Sweetback to Superfly: Race and Film Audiences in Chicago's Loop (2015)
- Beyond Blaxploitation (2016), co-editor
