= Solomon Andrews (inventor) =

American inventor and politician

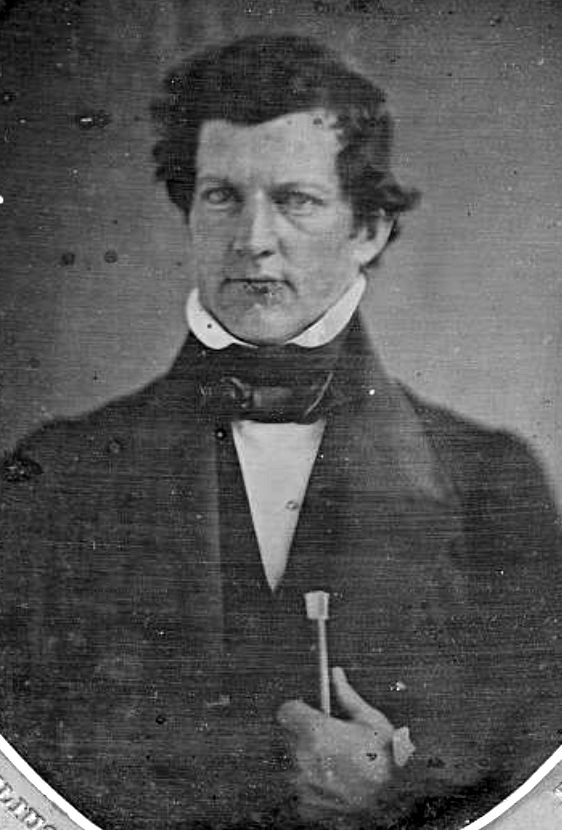

Mayor of Perth Amboy, New Jersey
- In office 1849–1855

Personal details
- Born: February 15, 1806 Herkimer, New York, U.S.
- Died: October 17, 1872 (aged 66) Perth Amboy, New Jersey, U.S.

Solomon Andrews (February 15, 1806 – October 17, 1872) was an American medical doctor, aviator and dirigible airship inventor. Andrews invented an airship called Aereon which received some notice in the 1860s. He claimed to sail it as one would a sailboat. Mention is made of the movement of pilot and passenger fore and aft in the basket to control attitude. He was a medical doctor and three times Mayor of Perth Amboy, New Jersey. He served as the health officer of Perth Amboy, New Jersey and supervised the construction of the city's first sewer system. He served as the Collector of the Port of New Jersey in Perth Amboy from 1844 to 1845.

== Biography ==
Solomon Andrews was born on February 15, 1806, in Herkimer, New York to Josiah Bishop Andrews and Mary Bissell. He received his medical degree from Rutgers Medical School in 1827. Later, Andrews would marry Harriet Johnson. In 1849, Andrews won election and served as Mayor of Perth Amboy, New Jersey for three different, inconsecutive terms. He was elected again in 1853 and again in 1855.

Solomon Andrew's daughter, Harriet Cornelia Andrews, married Frederick S. Hilton on June 15, 1858. Later in his life in 1863, Solomon's airship, Aereon, would fly for the first time. He would also live to see his second one fly too in 1866. Solomon Andrews died on October 17, 1872, in Perth Amboy, New Jersey. His widow died in 1881.

== Airships ==
The difference of specific gravity between the balloon and the surrounding atmosphere could be converted by a system of inclined planes to steer the craft without a motor. He referred to his propulsion as "gravitation." The craft was not normally trimmed to be neutrally buoyant. Instead it would be cycled between positive and negative buoyancy. The resulting airflow across the body of the craft and attached airfoils would propel it.

His first "Aereon" flew over Perth Amboy on June 1, 1863. This had three 80-foot cigar-shaped balloons, with a rudder and gondola. Buoyancy was controlled by jettisoning sand ballast or releasing hydrogen lift gas. Dr. Andrews wrote Abraham Lincoln later that summer offering the Aereon for use in the American Civil War, during which he served for a time as a volunteer surgeon with the Union Army. After much discussion, he arranged a demonstration early in 1864 before the Smithsonian Institution. He was informed, nearly a year later, that the Government had little interest in his invention, and by that time the war was nearly over.

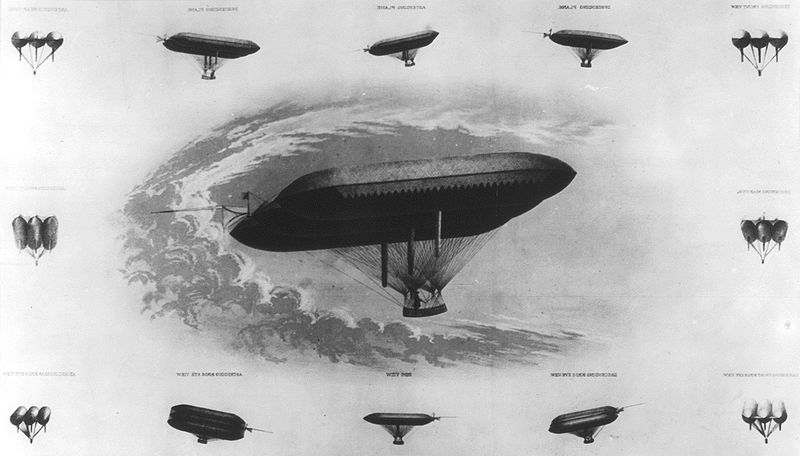
Lithograph of Solomon Andrews's first airship "Aereon"

Andrews then organized the Aerial Navigation Company to build commercial Airships and establish a regular line between New York and Philadelphia.

The "Aereon #2" had one "lemon-shaped" balloon, sharply pointed at the ends. It controlled buoyancy with a system of lines and pulleys that compressed the gas or allowed it to expand. This flew over New York City on May 25, 1866, and June 5, 1866. The second trip carried a passenger-assistant, though a news reporter had to be left out at the last minute because of weight problems, and ended at Oyster Bay, Long Island.

Andrews's airship company ultimately failed due in part to a nationwide economic recession and associated bank failures immediately after the war, and he never flew again.

== Other inventions ==
Andrews also invented a sewing machine, a barrel making machine, fumigators, forging presses, a kitchen range, a gas lamp, a nicotine-filtering pipe, rekeying and a padlock which has been used by the U.S. Post Office since 1842.

== Legacy ==
The Aereon Corporation attempted, in New Jersey in 1969, to replicate and improve on the airship designs of Solomon Andrews. This was written about in the book "The Deltoid Pumpkin Seed," by John McPhee (ISBN 9780374516352). This book and Andrews' work provided the inspiration for development of the Hyperblimp, and various embodiments of an underwater gliding toy, by inventor Daniel Geery.
