= Aurora, Texas =

- City
- Interactive map of Aurora, Texas
- Coordinates: 33°03′02″N 97°30′15″W
- Country: United States
- State: Texas
- County: Wise

Area
  - Total: 3.72 sq mi (9.64 km^{2})
  - Land: 3.72 sq mi (9.64 km^{2})
  - Water: 0 sq mi (0.00 km^{2})
- Elevation: 748 ft (228 m)

Population (2020)
  - Total: 1,390
  - Density: 373/sq mi (144/km^{2})
- Time zone: UTC-6 (Central (CST))
  - Summer (DST): UTC-5 (CDT)
- ZIP code: 76078
- Area code: 817
- FIPS code: 48-04672
- GNIS feature ID: 2409759
- Website: www.auroratexas.gov

Aurora is a city in Wise County, Texas, United States. The population was 1,390 in 2020.

== Geography ==
According to the United States Census Bureau, the town has a total area of 3.7 square miles (9.6 km^{2}), all land.

== Demographics ==
Historical population
Census	Pop.	Note	%±
1890	372		—
1980	376		—
1990	623		65.7%
2000	853		36.9%
2010	1,220		43.0%
2020	1,390		13.9%
2023 (est.)	1,554		11.8%
U.S. Decennial Census

=== 2020 census ===
As of the 2020 census, Aurora had a population of 1,390 and a median age of 40.6 years; 27.0% of residents were under the age of 18 and 14.4% were 65 years of age or older. For every 100 females there were 101.2 males, and for every 100 females age 18 and over there were 98.6 males. There were 356 families residing in the city.

There were 465 households in Aurora, of which 36.8% had children under the age of 18 living in them. Of all households, 68.0% were married-couple households, 12.3% were households with a male householder and no spouse or partner present, and 14.0% were households with a female householder and no spouse or partner present. About 15.7% of all households were made up of individuals and 6.5% had someone living alone who was 65 years of age or older.

There were 503 housing units, of which 7.6% were vacant. Among occupied housing units, 87.5% were owner-occupied and 12.5% were renter-occupied. The homeowner vacancy rate was 1.2% and the rental vacancy rate was 16.2%.

0% of residents lived in urban areas, while 100.0% lived in rural areas.

Racial composition as of the 2020 census
Race	Percent
White	73.2%
Black or African American	0.7%
American Indian and Alaska Native	1.2%
Asian	0.7%
Native Hawaiian and Other Pacific Islander	0%
Some other race	10.9%
Two or more races	13.2%
Hispanic or Latino (of any race)	23.5%

== Education ==
The Town of Aurora is served by the Northwest Independent School District.

- Seven Hills Elementary (K–5)
- Chisholm Trail Middle School (6–8)
- Northwest High School (9–12)

== UFO incident ==
Aurora is known for a purported UFO crash in April 1897, and the ongoing legend that the UFO's pilot is supposedly buried in the local cemetery. Although the town has embraced the legend to a point (the city's website mentions the legend), the cemetery association has refused all requests to exhume the alien's purported gravesite.
