= Kalai Strode =

American actor (1946-2014)

- Born: Woodrow Wilson Kalaeloa Strode; December 16, 1946; Hollywood, California, U.S.
- Died: November 27, 2014 (aged 67); Houston, Texas, U.S.
- Other names: Kalaeloa Strode; W Kalaeloa Strode
- Occupation: Assistant film director
- Years active: 1971–2011
- Parents: Woody Strode; Luukialuana Kalaeloa

Woodrow Wilson Kalaeloa Strode (December 16, 1946 – November 27, 2014) was a native Hawaiian assistant director in film and television from the early 1970s to around 2010. In film he worked on North Dallas Forty. In television he worked regularly in the series Diagnosis Murder. He also was an actor, writer and composer.

== Background ==
He was born on December 16, 1946, in Hollywood, California. He was of African and self-identified Native American ancestry (Cherokee and Muscogee) from his father's side. On his mother's side he was of Native Hawaiian descent. His father was professional football player and actor, Woody Strode. His mother was princess Luukialuana Kalaeloa who had done some work in films and was a hula dancer. She was also a descendant of Hawaii's last queen. He had a sister Junelehua (a.k.a. June) who was born in 1948. He also had two half-brothers. One was Hawaiian actor and entertainer, Lani Kai. The other was Hawaiian actor Lee Woodd.

== Film career ==
=== 1970s ===
He graduated from the Los Angeles Assistant Directors Training Program.

In 1971 he had a role in The Gatling Gun as the Indian Who Shoots Sneed. He was also in the credits as a stuntman in the film In the mid 1970s he was a co-writer for the western film Winterhawk. Later in the 1970s, he worked under director Richard Lang as second assistant director for the pilot episode of Fantasy Island that aired in January 1977.

=== 1980s ===
In the early 1980s, he was assistant director in the John Schlesinger directed comedy film Honky Tonk Freeway which starred Beverly D'Angelo, Hume Cronyn, Jessica Tandy and Beau Bridges. In 1985, he was assistant director in the made for television drama, Challenge of a Lifetime which was directed by Russ Mayberry, and starred Penny Marshall and Richard Gilliland. In 1988, he worked on the set of the film For Keeps.

=== 1990s ===
In 1991, he was assistant director in three episodes of Tales from the Crypt, Loved to Death, Abra Cadaver and Mournin' Mess. He was assistant director in the Randall M. Miller directed 1992 comedy Class Act which starred Christopher Reid and Christopher Martin. From 1994 to 1998 he worked in five seasons of episodes for television series Diagnosis Murder which starred Dick Van Dyke.

=== 2000s ===
In 2001, having completed his work on Diagnosis Murder, he and his wife Pam moved to Honolulu. He still did some work as assistant director but also worked in transportation for movies. His wife worked in the TV series Lost for six seasons as a stand in actress. In 2010 he worked on the film Deady Honeymoon that starred Summer Glau. In 2011, he had a role as Wali in the Ua Lawe Wale episode of the Hawaii Five-0 series remake. Both of his half brothers, Lani Kai and Lee Woodd had appeared in the original series of Hawaii Five-O. Post 2011, he underwent a physical examination as part of pre-employment for The River, which was shot in Puerto Rico and Hawaii. The examination resulted in a diagnosis of mantle cell lymphoma.

== Filmography ==
Film
Title	Role	Director	Year	Notes #
The Gatling Gun	Actor: Indian Who Shoots Sneed, Stunts: stunt archer	Robert Gordon	1971	
Winterhawk	Writer	Charles B. Pierce	1975	
A Piece of the Action	DGA trainee	Sidney Poitier	1977	
The One and Only	Trainee assistant director	Carl Reiner	1978	
Thank God It's Friday	Trainee assistant director	Robert Klane	1978	
Rainbow	Second assistant director	Jackie Cooper	1978	TV movie
The Immigrants	DGA trainee	Alan J. Levi	1978	TV movie
Suddenly, Love	Second assistant director	Stuart Margolin	1978	TV movie
A Woman Called Moses	DGA trainee	Paul Wendkos	1978	TV movie
Samurai	Second assistant director	Lee H. Katzin	1979	TV movie
North Dallas Forty	Second assistant director	Ted Kotcheff	1979	TV movie
Up the Academy	Second assistant director	Robert Downey Sr.	1980	
Bustin' Loose	First assistant director: second unit	Oz Scott, Michael Schultz	1981	
Honky Tonk Freeway	Second assistant director	John Schlesinger	1981	
When I Am King	Second assistant director	Wanda Appleton	1981	
Challenge of a Lifetime	Second assistant director	Russ Mayberry	1985	TV movie
Gidget's Summer Reunion	Second assistant director	Bruce Bilson	1985	
The Lost Boys	Second assistant director: second unit	Joel Schumacher	1987	as Woody K. Strode
For Keeps?	Second assistant director	John G. Avildsen	1988	
House Party	Assistant director	Reginald Hudlin	1990	as Kelly St. Rode
Phantom	Second assistant director		1990	TV movie
4 Faces	Second assistant director	Ted Post	1999	
Tyrannosaurus Azteca	Construction driver	Brian Trenchard-Smith	2007	
Tropic Thunder	Driver	Ben Stiller	2008	
Deadly Honeymoon	Second assistant director	Paul Shapiro	2010	TV movie

Television
Title	Episode #	Role	Director	Year	Notes #
Emergency!	unknown	Dga trainee	various	1972	Unknown
Police Story	unknown	Second assistant director	various	1973	Unknown
Fantasy Island	Pilot episode	Second assistant director	Richard Lang	1977	Season 1, Episode 1
Lou Grant	Unknown	Second assistant director	Various	1977	Unknown
The White Shadow	Here's Mud in Your Eye	Second assistant director	Bruce Paltrow	1978	Season 1, Episode 2
The White Shadow	Bonus Baby	Second assistant director	Jackie Cooper	1978	Season 1, Episode 4
The White Shadow	Pregnant Pause	Second assistant director	Jackie Cooper	1978	Season 1, Episode 5
ABC Afterschool Specials	A Special Gift	Second assistant director	Arthur Allan Seidelman	1979	Season 8, Episode 3
CBS Afternoon Playhouse	Think I'm Having a Baby	Second assistant director	Arthur Allan Seidelman	1981	Season 3, Episode 2
Matt Houston	X-22	Second assistant director	Richard Lang	1982	Season 1, Episode 1
Lottery	unknown	Second assistant director	various	1983	
Crazy Like a Fox	unknown	Second assistant director	various	1984	
Stir Crazy	unknown	Second assistant director	Christian I. Nyby II or Peter H. Hunt	1985	
Amerika	unknown	Second assistant director	Donald Wrye	1987	
Buck James	unknown	Second assistant director		1987	
Sonny Spoon	unknown	first assistant director	various	1988	
Down Home	unknown	Second assistant director	various	1990	
Sunset Beat	unknown	Second assistant director		1990	
Broken Badges	unknown	First assistant director	various	1990	
Human Target	unknown	Second assistant director	various	1992	
Diagnosis Murder	Many Happy Returns	Second assistant director	Lou Antonio	1994	Season 2, Episode 1
Diagnosis Murder	A Very Fatal Funeral	second assistant director	Alan Myerson	1994	Season 2, episode 2
Diagnosis Murder	Woman Trouble	Second assistant director	Roy Campanella II	1994	Season 2, Episode 3
Diagnosis Murder	The Busy Body	Second assistant director	Vincent McEveety	1994	Season 2, Episode 4
Diagnosis Murder	My Four Husbands	second assistant director	Christian I. Nyby II	1998	Season 2, Episode 5
Diagnosis Murder	Witness to Murder	second assistant director	Paris Barclay	1995	Season 3, Episode 2
Diagnosis Murder	The Pressure to Murder,	second assistant director	Christopher Hibler	1996	Season 3, Episode 9
Diagnosis Murder	The ABC's of Murder	second assistant director	Christian I. Nyby II	1996	Season 4, Episode 11
Diagnosis Murder	Murder in the Family	second assistant director	Vincent McEveety	1998	Season 4, Episode 12
Diagnosis Murder	Deadly Games	second assistant director	Christopher Hibler	1997	Season 5, Episode 4
Diagnosis Murder	Slam Dunk Dead	second assistant director	Vincent McEveety	1997	Season 5, Episode 5
Diagnosis Murder	A Mime Is a Terrible Thing to Waste	second assistant director	Christopher Hibler	1997	Season 5, Episode 11
Diagnosis Murder	Down and Dirty Dead	second assistant director	Ron Satlof	1997	Season 5, Episode 12
Diagnosis Murder	An Education in Murder	second assistant director	Frank Thackery	1998	Season 5, Episode 19
Diagnosis Murder	Murder at the Finish Line	second assistant director	Christopher Hibler	1998	Season 5, Episode 20
Hawaii Five-0	Ua Lawe Wale	actor: Wali	Duane Clark	2011	Season 2, Episode 2

== Writing ==
He had been a writer. Around or prior to the early 1970s, Strode had composed some songs. They included "Blood Red Moon", "Childling Sun" "Oh Mellow Day", "America Is My Home", "Love Has Its Stormy Seasons", "Me And My Magic Guitar", "Nani's Way", "A Thousand Ways", and "The Truth Is You", Another composition of his, possibly written a few years later was "Coco".

== Later years ==
By 2010 at the age of 63, he ran as an independent candidate for the United States House of Representatives. While he was interviewed about his candidacy by Lee Cataluña of the Honolulu Advertiser, he was working for Teamsters Local 996, driving an electrical rigging truck on a movie set of The Descendants. In the 2010 Special, he came 5th in a list of 14 candidates.

In 2014, he was interviewed for the documentary The Forgotten Four, which he and his wife attended the premiere for on September 9, 2014, in Westwood, California.

== Illness and death ==
During a medical examination as part of a pre-employment physical for a movie, Strode was diagnosed with Mantle cell lymphoma, a type of blood cancer. He took five months of chemotherapy and appeared to be in remission. In 2013, as a result of a routine PET scan, it was determined that his cancer had returned. He then relocated to Grand Forks for easier access to the Mayo Clinic.

After a three-year battle with the disease, Strode died on November 27, 2014. At the time of his passing, he was helping to care for his mother-in-law.
