= Lani Kai =

Hawaiian singer and actor

- Born: August 15, 1936
- Died: August 29, 1999 (aged 63)
- Occupations: Actor, singer, entertainer

Lani Kai (born George Clarence Dennis James Von Ruckleman Woodd III; August 15, 1936 – August 29, 1999) was a Hawaiian singer and actor. He had a role in the Elvis Presley film Blue Hawaii and was a regular cast member of the television series Adventures in Paradise.

== Background ==
Kai was born in Honolulu, Hawaii. He was brother of Lee Woodd, and the half brother of Kalai Strode and Junelehua Robertson. His mother Lukia Luana, a Hawaiian princess, was married to actor Woody Strode. His brother Lee Woodd, who was also an actor, died on 19 September 2002.

=== Death ===
He died on August 29, 1999, at a North Shore home of a friend, two weeks after his 63rd birthday.

== Music career ==
Kai got an early break on the Don Sherwood Show in San Francisco, California. In late 1959, his single "Now There Are None" / "Isle Of No Aloha" was released. In 1963, his album Island Love Songs was released. In November 1968, he was appearing live at the Hawaii-Five-O club with Al Lopaka and Nephi Hannemann.

In 1968, he had a single released on Don Ho's Hana Hou label.

In the late 1990s, he was working on an album with actor / singer Nephi Hannemann which was to be a follow-up to Hannemann's album The Polynesian Man but Kai died before it could come together.

=== Compositions ===
His composition "Puka Shells" which was recorded by Rod Young made it to no 2 in the Hawaiian music charts in the mid-1970s. He also co-composed "The Poor People" with Cliff Muller. Another composition "Shells" was recorded by Keola Beamer and included on his album for George Winston's Dancing Cat Records, Wooden Boat album.

== Lani Kai discography ==
Singles
Title	Label & cat	Year	Notes #
"Beach Party" / "Little Brown Gal (Cha Cha Cha)"	Keen 1–2023	1959	
"I'm Gonna Leave My Heart At Home" / "Batik"	Keen 82103	1959	
"Isle Of No Aloha" / "Now There Are None"	Keen 5–2023	1959	
"Pretty Little Nisei Girl" / "Tamoure'"	Chelan C-554	19??	Lani Kai & The Shells
Malia" / "Flying Bird"	Hana Ho 1024	1968	

Albums
Album title	Label & cat	Year	Notes #
Island Love Songs	Decca DL 4334	1963	
Hawaiian Magic (Featuring The Orchestra Of Lani Kai)	Diplomat Records D-2326	1964	

Various artists compilation albums
Song title	Album title	Label & catalogue	Year	Format	Notes
"Mystic Moon"	The International Vicious Society Vol. V	University Of Vice Records UOVR006	2011	Vinyl LP	
"I'm Gonna Leave My Heart At Home"	Cheesy Moments	Chrome Dreams	2012	CD	
"I'm Gonna Leave My Heart At Home"	Saints and Sinners Vol 7; 16 Obscure Rockin' Shots from Occident that will cut your head off!!!	Sheik LP-507	2012	Vinyl LP	
"I'm Gonna Leave My Heart At Home"	Teen Rockin' Party	Classics Records clcd 752	2014	CD	
"Beach Party"	Rockwool Rocker & Ruller Derudaf 2	Rockwool A/S		CD	

Compositions
Composition	Appears on album / single release	By artist	Label & catalogue	Year	Format	Notes
"Young Land"	Tiny Bubbles	Don Ho	Reprise RS 6232	1966	LP album	
"This Young Land"	Don Ho And The Aliis Volume II	Don Ho	Reprise PRO 310	1967	LP album	Credited co-writer Ralph Mathis
"This Young Land"
"Tu Tu Kane"	"Tu Tu Kane" / "The Windward Side (Of The Island)"	Don Ho	Reprise 0643	1968	7" Single	
"Shells"	Paddle, Two Paddle	Pat And His Paddlers	Kanaka KS-1001	1972	LP Album	
"Tu Tu kane"	"Tu Tu Kane" / "Tutu Wahine"	Nephi Hannemann	El Leon Records ERS 45/103		7" single	
"Tutu Wahine"	"Tu Tu Kane" / "Tutu Wahine"	Nephi Hannemann	El Leon Records ERS 45/103		7" single	
"Shells"	Shells	The Surfers	Trim Records TLP-1979	1974	LP Album	
"Tūtūkane"	Kū Ha‘aheo Kakou, E Nā Hawai‘i	Mel Amina	Hana Hou Records HHD 8819–4	1995	Cassette album	

== Film and television career ==
When he was 24 years old, he was picked for the television series Adventures in Paradise. He ended up with a role as Kelly the series from 1960 to 1962. He had also played the part of Carl Tanami in the 1961 film Blue Hawaii. Between the late 60s and early 70s, he appeared in a few Hawaii Five-O episodes. In one the episode The Joker's Wild, Man, Wild!, he played the part of Billy Hona. It also starred Beverlee McKinsey.

== Filmography ==
=== Feature film ===
- Blue Hawaii (1961) - Carl Tanami
- The Late Liz (1971) - Manu (final film role)

=== Television ===
- Adventures in Paradise - Episode: The Forbidden Sea - Khobu - (1 episode) (1960)
- Adventures in Paradise - Episodes: Various - Kelly Katimakaka, Kelly Kelimanaha, Kelly (26 episodes) (1960–1962)
- Hawaiian Eye - Episode: Go for Baroque - Johnny (1 episode) (1963)
- Hawaii Five-O - Episode: Yesterday Died and Tomorrow Won't Be Born - M.K. (1968)
- Hawaii Five-O - Episode: The Joker's Wild, Man, Wild! - Billy (1969)
- Hawaii Five-O - Episode: Most Likely to Murder - Lonnie Kahekili (1970)
