= African Americans in the Canadian Football League =

Sports history

African Americans have played prominent roles in the Canadian Football League (CFL) and its precursors since 1946. In many cases black Americans have been able to pursue professional football opportunities in the CFL that were for one reason or another unavailable in the United States. Especially in the mid-20th century, many African American players came to Canada to avoid the racially charged atmosphere of segregation-era America. For many years, blacks were better represented in the CFL than they were in the National Football League (NFL), and achieved a number of "firsts" in the CFL years before the same was accomplished in the NFL. More recently, the CFL has provided opportunities for black, as well as other, Americans unable to break into the NFL.

== Background ==
There were a small number of black players in the league now known as the National Football League from its inception in 1920. Following the 1933 season, however, there were no black players in the NFL or any other major-league level professional football association, including the precursors to the Canadian Football League, until 1946. During this period, black players were confined to minor leagues and independent barnstorming teams. At this time, however, college football was much more popular than any professional league.

This was also the time period in which Canadian football began to "professionalize". Having evolved out of rugby with the adoption of the forward pass in the 1920s, Canadian football grew in popularity in the subsequent years until teams made up of professional players began to dominate and displace amateur teams. Professionalization meant that teams were able to attract talent from a significantly wider pool. This benefited teams in smaller, primarily western Canadian cities that had a smaller pool from which to draw and were thus at a disadvantage compared to the larger eastern metropolises.

Beginning in 1935 Canadian teams began to recruit American players, a trend that continues today. At this time, the CFL was a legitimate competitor to the NFL, paying comparable wages and attracting a similar level of talent. However, there were no African Americans on any Canadian football team until 1946. In 1946, professional football took its first steps towards integration. The NFL signed two black players, Woody Strode and Kenny Washington, both of whom played for the Los Angeles Rams. However, the NFL's integration process was gradual: while individual teams signed individual black players, there was no active drafting of blacks until 1949, and some teams resisted integration for several more years (most famously owner George Preston Marshall refused to sign blacks to his Washington Redskins team as late as 1962, at which point he was forced to do so by the U.S. government).

The CFL's colour barrier was broken in 1946, when Montreal Alouettes general manager Lew Hayman signed Herb Trawick. From that point on, a steady flow of African Americans began to migrate to the CFL, which, at the time, was a legitimate competitor league to the NFL.

== CFL firsts ==
=== Players ===
In 1946, Montreal Alouettes GM Lew Hayman brought in Herb Trawick, making Trawick the first black player in the CFL. Hayman, a New York City-born Jew, saw the way that Montrealers had embraced Jackie Robinson with the Montreal Royals and believed the city was ready to accept a black football player.

In 1964, Tom Casey became the first black player inducted into the Canadian Football Hall of Fame, three years before New York Giant Emlen Tunnell became the first black player in the NFL's Pro Football Hall of Fame.

Trawick may not have been the first black player in the CFL. There is photographic evidence that Robert "Stonewall" Jackson was the first African-American player, with the Saskatchewan Roughriders, in 1930. He was a porter with the railways and is in a team picture from that year. Otherwise Gabe Patterson was the first black player to play for the Green Riders. In 1948, Ken Whitlock became the Toronto Argonauts' first black player.

=== Coaches ===
As Toronto Argonauts president in 1980, Heyman hired Willie Wood as the first black head coach in the CFL. It was nine more years until Art Shell became the first black coach in the National Football League, with the 1989 Oakland Raiders. (NOTE: Fritz Pollard served as head coach in the NFL prior to segregation.) Michael Clemons served as the first black head coach in the Grey Cup, coaching the Argonauts their Grey Cup victory 2004, two years prior to Tony Dungy coaching the Indianapolis Colts to victory in the Super Bowl XLI (Incidentally, Lovie Smith, the coach of the Chicago Bears, who also appeared in that Super Bowl game, made him and Dungy the first two African-American coaches to appear in the Super Bowl).

=== General managers ===
General manager of the Saskatchewan Roughriders from December 24, 1999, until August 21, 2006, Roy Shivers was the first black general manager in professional football.

General manager of the Edmonton Eskimos from December 10, 2012, until April 7, 2017, Ed Hervey was the first black general manager to win the Grey Cup in the Canadian Football League.

=== League commissioner ===
On March 17, 2015, the CFL named U.S.-born Jeffrey Orridge as its commissioner. He is the first African-American commissioner in the CFL's history and at the time of his appointment the first (and only) non-white head of a major North American sports league. Due to philosophical differences between Orridge and the Board of Governors of the CFL, Orridge announced he would step down as commissioner effective June 30, 2017. His last day as commissioner was June 15.

== Black quarterbacks ==
African American quarterbacks were commonplace in the CFL in the 1970s, two decades before they would become prominent in the NFL.

Undrafted in the NFL, Warren Moon won five Grey Cups in six seasons before excelling in the NFL, helping to erase the prejudice that black quarterbacks could not succeed in professional football. By the time Doug Williams of the Washington Redskins became the first black quarterback in the history of the Super Bowl in 1988, the CFL had already seen such players as Moon, Damon Allen, Roy Dewalt, Danny Barrett, J.C. Watts, Condredge Holloway and Chuck Ealey in Grey Cup games.

== Johnny Bright ==
Drake University star Johnny Bright – the victim of a racist assault in what is now known as the Johnny Bright Incident – turned down an offer to play for Philadelphia Eagles, who chose him fifth overall in the 1952 National Football League draft. Bright elected to sign with the Calgary Stampeders instead, later commenting:

I would have been their (the Eagles') first Negro player. There was a tremendous influx of Southern players into the NFL at that time, and I didn't know what kind of treatment I could expect.

In 1959, following his third straight season as the CFL's rushing leader, Bright won the CFL's Most Outstanding Player Award, the first black CFL player to be so honoured.

== Benefits to league ==
The CFL gained advantages through the recruitment of black players. African American players in the CFL outperformed their white counterparts in a number of areas. CFL teams that employed the highest percentage of African Americans were those teams that had the most on-field success.

== Racism in the CFL ==
All of which is not say that there were no problems with racism in the CFL. There was, according to legendary player Cookie Gilchrist, who is the only player to have refused induction into the Canadian Football Hall of Fame, citing racism and exploitation by team management. Whether Gilchrist's perspective was accurate is unclear; Gilchrist had developed paranoia due to chronic head trauma in his later years.

== Bibliography ==
- Danakas, John (November 13, 2007). Choice of Colours: How African American quarterbacks became Canadian stars. Lorimer. ISBN 978-1-55028-991-6.

== See also ==
- Black players in American professional football
- Black Canadians
