= Phillip Scott =

Phillip, Philip or Phil Scott may refer to:

- Phillip Scott (actor) (born 1952), Australian actor, singer, pianist, writer and comedian
- Phil Scott (born 1958), American politician, current governor of Vermont
- Phil Scott (footballer) (born 1961), former Australian rules footballer
- Phil Scott (boxer) (1900–1983), English heavyweight boxer
- Phil Scott (American football) (1906–1975), American football player
- Philip Scott (born 1974), retired Scottish footballer
- Phillip Scott (Virginia politician), American legislator
- Phil Scott (Australian politician), Western Australian state legislator
