= Ken Whitlock =

American gridiron football player (1920–2012)

Profile
- Position: Halfback

Personal information
- Born: March 23, 1920; Sewickley, Pennsylvania, US
- Died: January 31, 2012 (aged 91)

Career information
- High school: Sewickley
- College: Virginia State

Career history
- 1948: Toronto Argonauts

Awards and highlights
- Negro All-American (1940)

Kenneth E. Whitlock Sr. (March 23, 1920 – January 31, 2012) was an American professional football player for the Toronto Argonauts of the Interprovincial Rugby Football Union (IRFU), which later became part of the Canadian Football League (CFL). He was the first Black player for the Argonauts. After earning a master's degree in education, he became a school principal.

== Early life and college ==
Whitlock was born in Sewickley, Pennsylvania, the son of Frank Whitlock Sr., who was the first Black on Sewickley High School's football team in 1906. Following his father, Ken Whitlock also played football at Sewickley High.

Whitlock attended Virginia State College, where he played football with the Trojans. He earned Negro All-American honors as a junior in 1940. He left college to work, later returning to Sewickley to join the United States Marine Corps during World War II. The first Black marine from Allegheny County, he served in an all-Black combat unit, the 51st Defense Battalion based in North Carolina. He returned to college after the war, changing his major from agriculture to physical education.

== Professional football career ==
In 1948, Whitlock joined the Toronto Argonauts of the IRFU. (Note: The IRFU became part of the CFL in 1958.) The Argonauts had won three straight league titles with an all-Canadian roster. According to Whitlock, professional football in the United States was mostly segregated at the time, which led him to view Canada as his opportunity for a career in sports. At age 28, the 175-pound (79 kg) passing and kicking halfback became the first Black player for the Argonauts. In his regular-season debut, he scored on a punt for a rouge in a 20–7 win over Montreal. In the following game against Hamilton, Whitlock scored six points in the fourth quarter, including a five-yard touchdown run, helping lead Toronto to a 14–7 win. He played a total of four games for the Argonauts before being released.

== Later life ==
Whitlock returned to Virginia and earned a master's degree in education. In 1953, he was named the acting principal of the Mary M. Scott School, a new elementary school within the Richmond Public Schools in Richmond, Virginia. He was a principal at five schools before he retired in 1980. After beginning research for his autobiography in 1986, Breaking Barriers: The Ken Whitlock Story was published in 2001.

== Publications ==
- Whitlock, Kenneth; Burgess, Kelly (2001). Breaking Barriers: The Ken Whitlock Story. Signal Graphics Printing. OCLC 49667993.

== See also ==
- African Americans in the Canadian Football League
