= Dave Myers (American football) =

American football player (1906–1997)

Profile
- Positions: Guard, halfback

Personal information
- Born: 1906; New Bedford, Massachusetts, U.S.
- Died: March 5, 1997 (aged 90); Presque Isle, Maine, U.S.
- Listed height: 5 ft 11 in (1.80 m)
- Listed weight: 177 lb (80 kg)

Career information
- High school: Stuyvesant (NY)
- College: NYU

Career history
- Staten Island Stapletons (1930); Brooklyn Dodgers (1931)

David Willoughby Myers (1906 – March 5, 1997) was an American football player. He was one of the few black players in professional American football prior to World War II.

== Early life ==
Myers was born in 1906 in New Bedford, Massachusetts, the son of Willoughby Owen Myers and Isabelle Letitia Myers. He attended Stuyvesant High School in New York City. At Stuyvesant, he starred in football and basketball, won honors as a student, and served as president of the student council.

== NYU ==
He played college football for the NYU Violets from 1926 to 1929. He was rated as "one of the best running guards in the game." Paul Gallico selected Myers as a guard on his 1928 All-America team. Myers also threw the javelin for NYU's track team and set a metropolitan New York record with a distance of 202 feet, 11 inches.

In October 1929, he was moved from the guard position to become NYU's starting quarterback. One week later, reports surfaced that NYU had reached a "gentleman's agreement" to bench Myers for a scheduled game with the University of Georgia. The NAACP sent a letter of protest, and the chairman of NYU's athletic control board followed with a statement denying any such agreement and stating, "If we thought Georgia would show such poor sportsmanship as to demand Myers' removal from the lineup we would cancel our contract with the southern school." Gallico also wrote a column advocating that NYU play Myers. In the end, NYU agreed not to play Myers when Georgia refused to participate if Myers played. In response to the decision, Heywood Broun called NYU a "gutless college with a gutless coach." The game proceeded, and, despite demands from NYU fans in the stands, Myers did not play.

== Professional football ==
Myers played professional football in the National Football League (NFL) as a guard and halfback for the Staten Island Stapletons (1930) and Brooklyn Dodgers (1931). He appeared in 13 NFL games, 11 as a starter. Myers also played for the independent Viking-Bulldogs in 1931, for the Clifton Wessingtons of the Interstate Football League in 1933, and for the Churchill Pros in 1941.

== Later life ==
Myers worked for the New York Department of Welfare's Division of Special Investigations.

He died in 1997 at age 90 in Presque Isle, Maine.
