= Michael Dante =

American actor (born 1931)

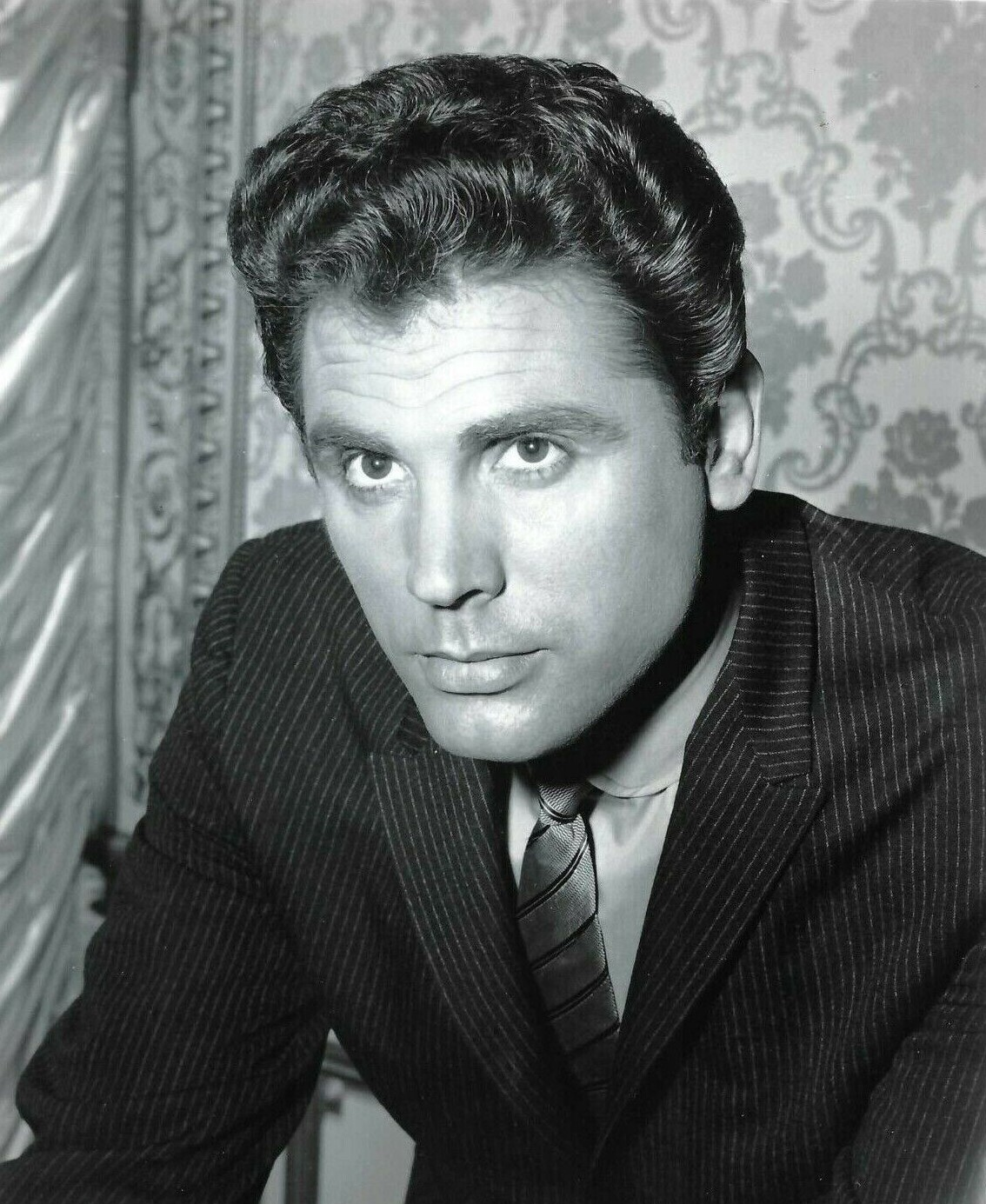
- Born: Ralph Vitti; September 2, 1931 (age 95); Stamford, Connecticut, U.S.
- Occupation: Actor
- Years active: 1956–present
- Spouse: Mary Jane Dante

Michael Dante (born Ralph Vitti, September 2, 1931) is an American actor and former professional minor league baseball player.

== Early life ==
Dante was born Ralph Vitti in Stamford, Connecticut on September 2, 1931. Growing up, he would sneak into a local movie theater with his friends to watch Westerns. "I grew up wanting to be the sidekick of The Lone Ranger and wanting to follow my heroes", Dante told a reporter in 2006.

He was a shortstop on the Stamford High School baseball team, then played for "The Advocate All-Stars" team which won a 1949 New England baseball championship. After graduating from high school, as Ralph Vitti signed a bonus contract with the Boston Braves. He used his $6,000 bonus to buy his family a four-door Buick with whitewalls.

== Career ==
During spring training with the former Washington Senators, Dante took drama classes at the University of Miami. Bandleader Tommy Dorsey arranged a screen test for him at Metro-Goldwyn-Mayer. His first film, Somebody Up There Likes Me, was released in 1956. He changed his name at the urging of studio boss Jack L. Warner, who thought "Vitti" would not fit well on theater marquees. Warner suggested some first names, from which the actor picked "Michael". He chose the last name "Dante" as it had belonged to some relatives.

Dante has appeared in 30 films and 150 television shows. He spent seven years in supporting roles under contract to three major studios at once: MGM, Warner Brothers and Twentieth Century Fox. He considers his best performances the role that he played in Killer Instinct on the CBS television series Desilu Playhouse, along with his roles in the movies Westbound (1959), Seven Thieves (1960) and Winterhawk (1975).

Other film credits include Fort Dobbs (1958), Kid Galahad (1962), Operation Bikini (1963), The Naked Kiss (1964), Apache Rifles (1964), Harlow (1965), Arizona Raiders (1965), Willard (1971), That's the Way of the World (1975), The Farmer (1977), Missile X: The Neutron Bomb Incident (1978), Beyond Evil (1980), Return from the River Kwai (1989), and Cage (1989).

Dante appeared on a few ABC/Warner Brothers series, including the Westerns Colt .45. On Maverick, he portrayed the killer Turk Mason in the 1957 episode "The Third Rider", with Jack Kelly. He appeared on Bourbon Street Beat, Rescue 8, and in three episodes of CBS's The Texan.

Dante made two guest appearances on Perry Mason starring Raymond Burr. In 1959, he played Arthur Manning in "The Case of the Dangerous Dowager", and, in 1965, he played murder victim Douglas Kelland in "The Case of the Feather Cloak."

He appeared on Star Trek television series in the role of "Maab" in the 1967 episode, "Friday's Child" alongside Julie Newmar. Dante has appeared at Star Trek conventions.

In 1969, he played Clay Squires, a bitter young half-breed man, in the episode "Long Night at Fort Lonely" on the syndicated Death Valley Days, with Robert Taylor (actor) as Ben Cotterman and June Dayton as Cotterman's wife, Rachel and in 1972 he played a harried TV commercial director in My Three Sons. In 1974, he played Julio Tucelli in The Six Million Dollar Man episode, "Dr. Wells Is Missing". Dante had recurring roles on the television serials Days of Our Lives and General Hospital.

In the 1970s, Dante met John Wayne, whom he watched on screen as a child. Wayne had seen Dante in Winterhawk and asked him to co-host a charity event in Newport Beach, California. That started a friendship between the two actors, and they co-hosted other events until Wayne's death in 1979.

Michael Dante hosted his own syndicated radio talk show, from 1995 to 2007, called On Deck and previously known as the Michael Dante Celebrity Talk Show. His program guests included Milton Berle, Tony Curtis, Ron Ely, Bryant Gumbel, Stack Pierce, Connie Stevens and Stella Stevens. An avid golfer, he once hosted the annual Michael Dante Celebrity Golf Tournament, a charitable fund-raiser held annually in Palm Springs, California, beginning in 1991.

In 2006, Dante told an interviewer that he had written a script for a sequel to Winterhawk and was trying to get funding for the projected movie.

== Awards ==
- The Silver Spur Award (called the "Golden Globe of the Western film and television genre") presented by Reel Cowboys
- The Golden Boot Award ("the Oscar of Westerns")
- Southern California Motion Picture Council Award for the 'Best of the Best' in the Motion Picture Industry
- Wall of Fame Honoree – Stamford High School – Stamford, Connecticut
- Spirit of the West Award by Wild West Gazette/Bison Western Museum
- Palm Springs Film Festival Award for the Sammy Fuller classic film The Naked Kiss
- 1994 – Golden Palm Star on the Walk of Stars
- Apacheland Days, Apache Junction, Arizona – Guest of Honor – Western boot prints in cement – Superstition Mountain Museum

== Filmography ==
Film
Year	Title	Role	Notes
1956	Somebody Up There Likes Me	Shorty the Greek	(uncredited)
1957	Jeanne Eagels	Sgt. O'Hara in 'Rain'	(uncredited)
1958	Fort Dobbs	Billings	
1958	Born Reckless	Cowboy Dancing with Jackie	(uncredited)
1959	Westbound	Rod Miller	
1960	Seven Thieves	Louis Antonizz	
1962	Kid Galahad	Joie Shakes	
1963	Operation Bikini	Lt. William 'Bill' Fourtney	
1964	The Naked Kiss	Grant	
1964	Apache Rifles	Red Hawk	
1965	Harlow	Ed	
1965	Arizona Raiders	Brady	
1971	Willard	Brandt	
1973	Thirty Dangerous Seconds	Timothy Sills	
1975	That's the Way of the World	Mike Lemongello	
1975	Winterhawk	Winterhawk	
1977	The Farmer	Johnny O.	
1979	Missile X: The Neutron Bomb Incident	Konstanine Senyonov	
1980	Beyond Evil	Del Giorgio	
1983	The Big Score	Goldy	
1986	The Messenger	Emerson	
1989	Return from the River Kwai	Commander Davidson	
1989	Cage	Tony Baccola	
2020	Unbelievable!!!!!	Michael Dante	

Television
Year	Title	Role	Notes
1957-1958	Sugarfoot	Mike Wilson / Walt Lane / Ken Brazwell	3 episodes
1957-1958	Colt .45	Ab Saunders / Davey Bryant	2 episodes
1957-1958	Cheyenne	Billy Bob / Whitey / Lt. Dowd / ...	4 episodes
1958	Tales of the Texas Rangers	Alfredo	Episode: "Edge of Danger"
1958	Rescue 8	Mickey	Episode: "The Steel Mountain"
1959	Lawman	Jack McCall	Episode: "The Captives"
1959	The Adventures of Rin Tin Tin	Ramon Estrada	Episode: "The Matador"
1957-1959	Maverick	Joe / Turk Mason / Sam Harris	3 Episodes
1959	Westinghouse Desilu Playhouse	Angel	Episode: "The Killer Instinct"
1959	The Texan	Steve Chambers	4 episodes
1960	Bourbon Street Beat	Gunner Doyle	Episode: "Inside Man"
1960	General Electric Theater	Holofernes	Episode: "The Story of Judith"
1961	Checkmate	Trumpet Player	Episode: "Voyage Into Fear"
1961	The Detectives	Joe Rano	Episode: "The Champ"
1961	Cain's Hundred	Danny Speckter	Episode: "Final Judgment: Alexander Marish"
1962	87th Precinct	Larry Brooks	Episode: "Idol in the Dust"
1963	Hawaiian Eye	Harry Larcombe	Episode: "Go Steady with Danger"
1959-1965	Perry Mason	Douglas Kelland / Arthur Manning	2 Episodes
1965	Bonanza	Miguel Ortega	Episode: "The Brass Box"
1965	Days of Our Lives	Barney Jannings	(1984)
1966	Get Smart	Savage	Episode: "Kisses for KAOS"
1967	Star Trek: The Original Series	Maab	Episode: "Friday's Child"
1967	Custer	Crazy Horse	16 Episodes
1968	The Big Valley	Francisco	Episode: "Deathtown"
1959-1969	Death Valley Days	Clay Squires / Capt. Richard Rocha	2 Episodes
1969	Daniel Boone	Akari	Episode: "For a Few Rifles"
1972	My Three Sons	Perry Perigrine	Episode: "TV Triplets"
1974	The Six Million Dollar Man	Julio Tucelli	Episode: "Dr. Wells Is Missing"
1980	The Magical World of Disney	Ross	Episode: "The Kids Who Knew Too Much"
1980	The Kids Who Knew Too Much	Ross	TV movie
1982	Knots Landing	Captain Alving	Episode: "Night"
1983-1984	The Fall Guy	Oscar Fields / Tommy	2 Episodes
1986	Simon & Simon	Mr. Tobias	Episode: "Tonsillitis"
1987	Cagney & Lacey	Paul Bennet	Episode: "Right to Remain Silent"
2018	Find Your Future Reality	Michael Dante	
