= Black Jesus (film) =

1968 film

- Film poster
- Directed by: Valerio Zurlini
- Screenplay by: Franco Brusati; Valerio Zurlini
- Story by: Valerio Zurlini
- Produced by: Carlo Lizzani
- Starring: Woody Strode; Franco Citti; Jean Servais; Stephen Forsyth
- Cinematography: Aiace Parolin
- Edited by: Franco Arcalli
- Music by: Ivan Vandor
- Production companies: Ital-Noleggio Cinematografico; Castoro Film
- Distributed by: Ital-Noleggio Cinematografico
- Release date: May 1968
- Running time: 93 minutes
- Country: Italy
- Language: Italian

Black Jesus (Italian: Seduto alla sua destra, lit. "Sitting to his right") is a 1968 Italian drama film co-written and directed by Valerio Zurlini and starring Woody Strode. It is inspired by the final days of the first Prime Minister of the Democratic Republic of the Congo, Patrice Lumumba. It was listed to compete at the 1968 Cannes Film Festival, but the festival was cancelled due to the May 1968 events in France.

== Synopsis ==
Maurice Lalubi, the leader of an African liberation movement, is captured by government mercenaries. In prison, he befriends Oreste, an Italian adventurer locked up for his shady dealings. Despite facing torture to force him to renounce his ideas, Lalubi stands strong. Eventually, the military kills him, and Oreste meets the same fate.

== Cast ==
- Woody Strode as Maurice Lalubi
- Franco Citti as Oreste
- Jean Servais as Commander
- Pier Paolo Capponi as Officer
- Stephen Forsyth as Prisoner
- Luciano Lorcas as Sergent
- Salvatore Basile (credited as Salvo Basile)
- Giuseppe Transocchi
- Silvio Fiore
- Renzo Rossi
- Mirella Pamphili (credited as Mirella Panfili)
- Bruno Corazzari as Torturer (uncredited)
- Inigo Lezzi as Soldier (uncredited)
