= 1948 Ottawa Rough Riders season =

IRFU Canadian football season

- Head coach: Wally Masters
- Home stadium: Lansdowne Park

Results
- Record: 10–2
- Division place: 1st, IRFU
- Playoffs: Lost Grey Cup

The 1948 Ottawa Rough Riders finished in first place in the Interprovincial Rugby Football Union with a 10–2 record but lost the Grey Cup game to the Calgary Stampeders.

== Preseason ==
Game	Date	Opponent	Results		Venue	Attendance
Game	Date	Opponent	Score	Record	Venue	Attendance
A	Aug 21	at Hamilton Tigers	W 13–7	1–0		

== Regular season ==
=== Standings ===
Interprovincial Rugby Football Union
Team	GP	W	L	T	PF	PA	Pts
Ottawa Rough Riders	12	10	2	0	264	130	20
Montreal Alouettes	12	7	5	0	221	172	14
Toronto Argonauts	12	5	6	1	160	191	11
Hamilton Wildcats	12	1	10	1	88	240	3

=== Schedule ===
Week	Game	Date	Opponent	Results		Venue	Attendance
Week	Game	Date	Opponent	Score	Record	Venue	Attendance
1	1	Tue, Aug 31	at Montreal Alouettes	W 36–18	1–0	Delormier Stadium	11,000
2	2	Sat, Sept 4	vs. Hamilton Wildcats	W 30–5	2–0	Lansdowne Park	11,000
3	3	Sat, Sept 11	vs. Montreal Alouettes	L 8–11	2–1	Lansdowne Park	11,000
4	4	Sat, Sept 18	at Toronto Argonauts	W 32–12	3–1	Varsity Stadium	19,500
5	5	Sat, Sept 25	vs. Toronto Argonauts	W 12–5	4–1	Lansdowne Park	14,158
6	6	Sat, Oct 2	at Hamilton Wildcats	W 26–6	5–1	Civic Stadium	7,000
7	7	Sat, Oct 9	vs. Montreal Alouettes	W 17–7	6–1	Lansdowne Park	11,000
8	8	Sat, Oct 16	vs. Toronto Argonauts	W 41–6	7–1	Lansdowne Park	14,000
9	9	Sat, Oct 23	at Hamilton Wildcats	W 17–8	8–1	Civic Stadium	4,000
9	10	Sun, Oct 24	at Montreal Alouettes	L 13–35	8–2	Delorimier Stadium	16,000
10	11	Sat, Oct 30	vs. Hamilton Wildcats	W 18–5	9–2	Lansdowne Park	8,704
11	12	Sat, Nov 6	at Toronto Argonauts	W 14–12	10–2	Varsity Stadium	18,000

== Postseason ==
=== Playoffs ===
Round	Date	Opponent	Results		Venue	Attendance
Round	Date	Opponent	Score	Record	Venue	Attendance
IRFU Final #1	Nov 11	at Montreal Alouettes	L 19–21	0–1	Delorimier Stadium	15,000
IRFU Final #2	Nov 13	vs. Montreal Alouettes	W 15–7	1–1	Lansdowne Park	14,000
Eastern Final	Nov 20	vs. Hamilton Tigers	W 19–0	2–1	Lansdowne Park	15,000
Grey Cup	Nov 27	vs. Calgary Stampeders	L 7–12	2–2	Varsity Stadium	20,013

==== Grey Cup ====
Teams	1 Q	2 Q	3 Q	4 Q	Final
Calgary Stampeders	0	6	0	6	12
Ottawa Rough Riders	1	0	6	0	7
