= The Gatling Gun =

1969 film by Robert Gordon

- Directed by: Robert Gordon
- Written by: Mark Hanna; Joseph Van Winkle
- Produced by: Oscar Nichols; Giuseppe Balestrieri; Mark Hanna
- Starring: Guy Stockwell
- Cinematography: Jacques Marquette
- Edited by: Edward Mann
- Music by: Paul Sawtell; Bert Shefter
- Production company: Broadway Enterprises
- Distributed by: Ellman Film Enterprises
- Release date: May 1971
- Running time: 93 minutes
- Country: United States
- Language: English

The Gatling Gun originally titled King Gun is a Western shot in 1969 in New Mexico that features then New Mexico Governor David Cargo in a small role. The final film of director Robert Gordon, was not released until 1971.

== Plot ==
Lured by Apache gold, two cavalry troopers desert their post, killing some of their fellow troopers in order to steal a Gatling gun. The devious two use a pacifist pastor to bring the weapon across the country. A pursuing cavalry patrol kills one of the deserters and captures the other, however the recovered weapon has been made inoperable.

The Apaches, under their chief Two Knife, relentlessly attack the patrol in order to get the Gatling gun, or "King Gun" as they call it, to use against the soldiers.

== Cast ==
- Guy Stockwell as Lieutenant Wayne Malcolm
- Robert Fuller as Trooper Sneed
- Barbara Luna as Leona
- Woody Strode as Runner
- Patrick Wayne as Jim Boland
- Pat Buttram as Tin Pot
- Carlos Rivas as Two Knife
- John Carradine as Reverend Harper
- Judy Jordan as Martha Boland
- Phil Harris as Luke Boland
- Tommy Cook as Trooper Elwood
- Steve Conte as Trooper Mitchell
- David Cargo as Corporal Benton
- Kalai Strode as Indian Who Shoots Sneed

== See also ==
- List of American films of 1971
