= This Is Not a Test (1962 film) =

- Directed by: Fredric Gadette
- Written by: Peter Abenheim; Fredric Gadette; Betty Lasky
- Produced by: Murray De Atley; Fredric Gadette
- Starring: Seamon Glass; Thayer Roberts; Aubrey Martin; Mary Morlas; Mike Green; Alan Austin; Carol Kent; Norman Winston; Ron Starr; Don Spruance
- Cinematography: Brick Marquard
- Edited by: Hal Dennis
- Music by: Greig McRitchie
- Distributed by: Allied Artists
- Release date: 1962
- Running time: 73 minutes
- Country: United States
- Language: English

This Is Not a Test is a 1962 American low-budget science fiction film directed by Fredric Gadette. Produced at the height of the Cold War, the film was one of a number of productions of the late 1950s and early 1960s based upon the premise of the outbreak of nuclear war.

== Plot ==
Starring a group of mostly unknown actors, This Is Not a Test begins with lone deputy sheriff Dan Colter (Seamon Glass) receiving orders to block a road leading into an unidentified city (dialogue indicates the location is somewhere in central California, however). Soon, he has detained several vehicles with a variety of occupants ranging from an elderly man and his granddaughter, to a man who has recently become rich and his alcoholic wife, to a trucker and a hitchhiker. The motorists and the police officer hear attack warnings over the police radio and begin to prepare for the inevitable bombing. The film focuses on the reactions to the impending attack by the motorists, and the officer's efforts to keep order. Complicating matters is the revelation that the hitchhiker Clint Delany (Ron Starr) is a psychotic who is wanted for murder. As the countdown to the missile attack continues, the men and women try desperately to convert a supply truck into an impromptu bomb shelter. As time goes by, the deputy's behavior becomes irrational and the film ends with the deputy trying to enter the closed-up truck where the others have sheltered just as the nuclear strike happens. What condition the survivors find when they exit the shelter is not disclosed.

== Home media ==
This Is Not a Test is presently in the public domain in the United States, and has been released in numerous DVD formats, on its own or in collections of similar films.

== Reception ==
TV Guide found the movie inept, though admitting it did try to make social commentary. Gary Westfahl mentioned that the film shows the ineptitude that would come from ordinary people in the face of impending nuclear attack.
