= Seamon Glass =

American actor and author (1925–2016)

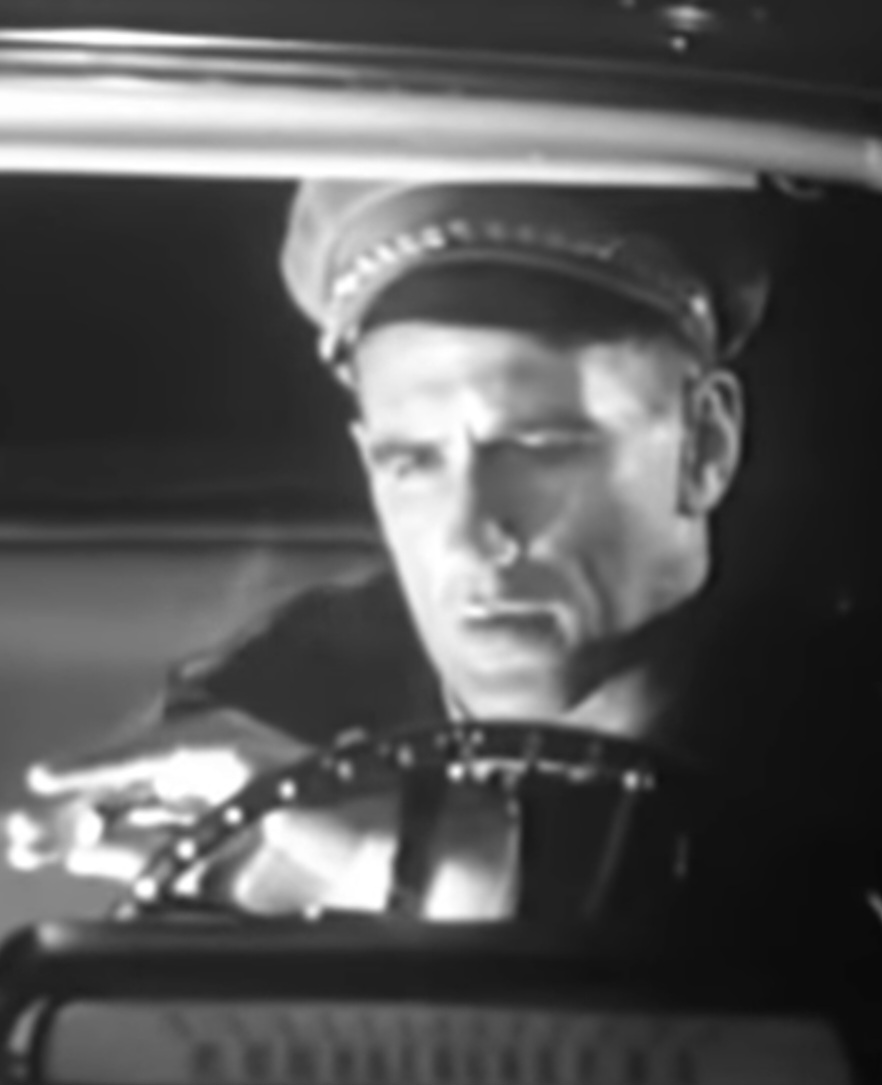
- Glass in This Is Not a Test (1962)
- Born: September 26, 1925; Los Angeles, California, U.S.
- Died: July 12, 2016 (aged 90); Los Angeles, California, U.S.
- Occupations: Actor, author
- Years active: 1961–2005
- Spouse: Yan Zhang

Seamon Glass (September 26, 1925 – July 12, 2016) was an American actor and author. He acted in film and television from the early 1960s to the early 1990s. He appeared in the films This Is Not a Test (1962), Deliverance (1972), Bootleggers (1974), and Winterhawk (1975).

== Background ==
He was born in Brooklyn, New York, on September 26, 1925, the son of Kadysh Glass (c. 1870–1937) and Anna Glass. He died in Los Angeles on July 12, 2016. His family's name was originally "Altglas" but changed to "Glass". His father died when he was 11 years old, and the family moved to California.

== World War II ==
With his mother's permission, he joined the U.S. Marine Corps at the age of 17 during World War II, serving in British Samoa and the Marshall Islands. He received a disability pension after suffering a hearing loss during a Japanese bombing raid. Glass was sent to the brig four times, His novel of his service in a Marine aviation unit entitled The Half Ass Marines was published in 2010.

== Postwar career ==
Following the war Glass attended Santa Monica Junior College on the G.I. Bill where he became heavyweight boxing champion of the college; the experience leading him into amateur and professional boxing.

He held a variety of jobs including being a seaman with the U.S. Merchant Marine, a school teacher of English and Social Studies as well as guidance counselor at Fairfax High School in Los Angeles, a bartender, a newspaper columnist for the Santa Monica Independence and a bodyguard for Darryl F. Zanuck's daughter Darrylin.

Glass had a brief professional boxing career in 1960 in Los Angeles, compiling a record of 1–2. where he was sponsored by actress Anna Maria Alberghetti.

== Hollywood career ==
When acting as a boxing instructor and sparring partner, Glass met many actors and Hollywood film people who wanted to box but did not want any damage to their faces or to be hurt. One of his clients was producer and director Fred Gadette who found him several acting roles and stunt work experiences.

=== 1960s ===
He was the lead actor in This Is Not a Test (1962), a film about a lawman who sets up a roadblock to catch a criminal then hears on the radio that there is going to be a nuclear attack. He also appeared in Star Trek, in the episode "Mudd's Women" as Benton (1966).

Glass turned down extra work requirements in films such as Kid Galahad (1962) and Captain Newman, M.D. leading to his appearances in the films to be reduced with Glass preferring the rewards and financial security of teaching and seaman jobs to the non reliability of an acting career. His agent, the former actor Hugh French dropped him when Glass's taking a merchant voyage led him to lose a role that was requested by John Wayne, possibly the Sons of Katie Elder.

=== 1970s ===
Glass was the menacing 'First Griner' in John Boorman's film Deliverance (1972). He played staff member Tim Donahue in the film The Other Side of Hell (1978), about a mental inmate played by Alan Arkin who regains his sanity and wants to leave the hospital.

Glass returned to teaching by leaving America and working in China.

=== 1970s–1980s ===
Seamon Glass worked as a Santa Monica Harbor patrolman, preferring the night shift. This provided a few quiet hours to continue writing his books and a regular newspaper column for the Santa Monica Independent.

== Filmography ==
| Year | Title | Role | Notes |
|---|---|---|---|
| 1960 | Spartacus | Pirate | Uncredited |
| 1961 | The George Raft Story | Jack McGurk aka McGurn | Uncredited |
| 1962 | Kid Galahad | Boxer | Uncredited |
| 1962 | This Is Not a Test | Deputy Sheriff Dan Colter | |
| 1963 | For Love or Money | Seaman | Uncredited |
| 1963 | Captain Newman, M.D. | Patient | Uncredited |
| 1967 | Chubasco | Emile | Uncredited |
| 1969 | Childish Things | Ex-Fighter | |
| 1972 | Deliverance | First Griner | |
| 1973 | Slither | Farmer in Truck | |
| 1973 | Sleeper | Guard | Uncredited |
| 1974 | Blazing Saddles | Cowboy | Uncredited |
| 1974 | Bootleggers | Rufus Woodall | |
| 1975 | Johnny Firecloud | Grissom | |
| 1975 | Winterhawk | Big Smith | |
| 1976 | Harry and Walter Go to New York | Guard | |
| 1977 | Damnation Alley | Mountain Man #2 | |
| 1978 | An Enemy of the People | | |
| 1978 | The Norseman | Stargazer | |
| 1979 | The Rose | Trucker #3 | |
| 1981 | Amy | Mr. Watkins | |
| 1982 | Partners | Gillis | |
| 1987 | Hawken's Breed | Pa Hickman | |

== Television ==
| Year | Title | Role | Notes |
|---|---|---|---|
| 1966 | Star Trek: The Original Series | Benton | S1:E6, "Mudd's Women" |

== Publication ==
- Half-Assed Marines. ISBN 1450235638. 2010
