= Cage (film) =

1989 film by Lang Elliott

- U.S theatrical poster
- Directed by: Lang Elliott
- Written by: Hugh Kelley
- Produced by: Lang Elliott
- Starring: Reb Brown; Lou Ferrigno; Michael Dante; James Shigeta
- Cinematography: Jacques Haitkin
- Edited by: Mark S. Westmore
- Music by: Michael Wetherwax
- Production companies: Cage Productions; Lang Elliott Entertainment
- Distributed by: New Century–Vista Films Company; Image Organization
- Release date: September 1, 1989; (U.S.)
- Running time: 101 minutes
- Country: United States
- Language: English
- Box office: $618,178 (U.S.)

Cage is a 1989 American martial arts action film produced and directed by Lang Elliott, starring Reb Brown, Lou Ferrigno, Michael Dante and James Shigeta. In a story pitched as a modern take on Of Mice and Men, a Vietnam War veteran (Brown) attempts to save his mentally challenged former squadmate (Ferrigno) from exploitation at the hand of an underground fighting ring.

== Plot ==
In 1969, at the height of the Vietnam War, GI Billy Thomas saves captain Scott Monroe's life, but gets shot in the head in the process. The extensive brain damage leaves him with diminished mental capabilities. After the war, Scott opens a bar in Los Angeles and keeps Billy under his wing, but they soon find themselves on shaky financial ground and targeted by mafiosi. Their boss, Tony Baccola, sees the naive yet physically imposing Billy as the perfect contestant for a series of unsanctioned, ultra violent cage fights organized by a Chinese–American kingpin, Tin Lum Yin, to whom he owes money.

== Cast ==
- Lou Ferrigno as Billy Thomas
- Reb Brown as Scott Monroe
- Michael Dante as Tony Baccola
- Mike Moroff as Mario
- Marilyn Tokuda as Morgan Garrett
- Al Leong as Tiger Joe
- James Shigeta as Tin Lum Yin
- Branscombe Richmond as Diablo
- Tiger Chung Lee as Chang
- Al Ruscio as Costello
- Daniel Martine as Mono
- Rion Hunter as Chao Tung
- Dana Lee as Pang
- Maggie Mae Miller as Meme
- Matthias Hues as Italian Fighter
- Paul Sorensen as Matt
- Danny Trejo as Costello's Bodyguard (uncredited)

== Production ==
=== Development and writing ===
Producer/director Lang Elliot met the film's main backer, Wichita Falls financial advisor Larry Lebow, when the latter entered his office by mistake at a theater, while on holiday in Los Angeles in 1986. The film's pitch came from Mobile, Alabama, screenwriter Hugh Kelley, who wrote the script after hearing about underground fights supposedly happening in Chinese–American neighborhoods. The part of Billy was written with Lou Ferrigno in mind. Ferrigno had previously been considered to play Lenny Small in an NBC adaptation of Of Mice and Men, before the role went to Randy Quaid. The bodybuilder relished the opportunity to play a mentally damaged character that could showcase his acting capabilities, and shed 60 pounds for the occasion. He retrospectively highlighted it as his favorite performance.

=== Filming ===
Principal photography started in its August 22, 1988, and took place in the Los Angeles area. The crew spent one week on location in the city's Chinatown. Another week was dedicated to recreating the Vietnam War shootout. Due to the tight schedule, some days started as early as 4:30 a.m. and ended as late as 10:30 p.m. Screenwriter Kelley, credited with an 8th degree black belt in karate, and his son Kit, a martial artist himself, contributed to the fight choreography, which incorporated elements of wrestling and brawling. Actor Mike Moroff humorously distributed t-shirts proclaiming "Mario Lives!" to the crew, to lobby for his character's survival despite him being written to die.

== Release ==
=== Pre-release ===
The film was screened for industry professionals during the Cannes Film Market in May 1989. Hugh Kelley announced he was working on a novelization of his screenplay, but there is no indication that it was published.

=== Theatrical ===
Cage was originally slated for an early 1989 release. It was picked up by the New Century–Vista Film Company after completion, and released in U.S. theaters on September 1, 1989.

=== Home video ===
In the U.S., the film was released on VHS on April 26, 1990, through Orion Home Video. In the U.K., the film premiered on tape on December 5, 1989, courtesy of Braveworld.

== Reception ==
Cage has received largely negative reviews, with most criticism focusing on its exploitation of a disabled character. Dave Kehr of the Chicago Tribune called it "an unusually unhappy effort" even by the traditionally low standard of September releases. He added that "[t]he action scenes are routinely staged and sparsely provided; the dialogue is deeply embarrassing". He reserved a few kind words for James Shigeta in "the film's most knowing and entertaining performance". Gary Thompson of the Philadelphia Daily News was equally unimpressed, putting the film on par with the recent Kickboxer, and complaining that "the standards of acting, writing and directing are uniformly low". He added that "[t]he plot is disjointed thanks to horrible editing" and that "it distinguishes itself by descending to new, deplorable depth" by putting Ferrigno's mentally challenged character in fights to the death. LA Weekly commented that Cage "made [them] understand what critics mean when they say a movie appeals to the audience's worst instincts. [...] Director Lang Elliott unabashedly exploits the Ferrigno character's handicap in an effort to make us enjoy seeing the villains get slaughtered in various painful ways. The cage fights are observed by a surrounding mob of dehumanized, hardened spectators; with remarkable success, the film attempts to make us that mob." Writing for the Copley News Service, David Elliott called the film "a mud hovel of a movie" which epitomized the "Golden Age of Exploiting Vietnam Veterans". He found distasteful parallels between Ferrigno's hearing handicap and his character's own disability. Kevin Thomas of the Los Angeles Times delivered a rare positive opinion, hailing it as "tautly and plausibly constructed" and "an exceptionally stylish and dynamic martial-arts movie".

== Sequel ==
Cage II: The Arena of Death was released direct-to-video in the U.S. on December 14, 1994. Ferrigno, Brown, Elliott and Hugh Kelley all returned for the sequel.
