= Nephi Hannemann =

American Samoan actor (1945–2018)

- Album cover of Nephi the Polynesian man
- Born: February 6, 1945; American Samoa
- Died: March 31, 2018 (aged 73); Los Angeles, California, US
- Resting place: Laie Cemetery
- Occupations: Actor, Singer
- Years active: 1968–2018
- Relatives: Mufi Hannemann, brother

Nephi Hannemann (February 6, 1945 – March 31, 2018) was an American actor and singer of Samoan, German and English descent who appeared numerous times on Hawaii Five-O and One West Waikiki.

== Biography ==
Nephi Hannemann was born in American Samoa to Gustav Hannemann and Faiaso Soliai Hannemann. His brother is Mufi Hannemann, the 12th Mayor of City and County of Honolulu.

Hannemann was one of seven children, four boys and three girls. His mother was the daughter of notable Samoan chiefs, with a type of royal heritage. He had German heritage on the side of his father, Gustav.

Hannemann was a member of the Church of Jesus Christ of Latter-day Saints.

He graduated from Farrington High School in 1962, and was a football player at Ricks College in Idaho and at the University of Hawaii at Manoa.

Hannemann died on March 31, 2018, in Los Angeles, at the age of 73.

== Entertainer ==
Besides acting, Hannemann was an accomplished singer and recording artist. He would provide entertainment at Democratic Party rallies, such as those attended by Governor George Ariyoshi and Hawaii State Senator Francis A. Wong.

At one time, he was said to have rivalled singer Don Ho in versatility.

Hannemann was working on a second album with Lani Kai but unfortunately, Lani died before its completion. He has an appearance on the LP album Invitation to Paradise ~ Polynesian Cultural Center, released by BMC in 1979.

He had a recurring role as Nephi in One West Waikiki, and has had various roles in films.

== Other ==
As well as writing scripts and screen plays for a number of years, Hannemann helped establish a business and travel magazine in 1983 called the Maui Quarterly. For seven years, he served as its main writer and advertising director. As of 2002, he was the spokesman for Hawaiian and Polynesian-made healthcare products.

== Discography ==
- Nephi, the Polynesian man. Honolulu, HI: El Leon Records. 1972. OCLC 663112487. ASIN B004A6GY0A.
- Mufi Hannemann, Nephi Hannemann, Iva Kinimaka, Royal Hawaiian Band (2006). Christmas Time Again, Aloha. Christmas with the Royal Hawaiian Band and friends (CD). Honolulu, HI: Royal Hawaiian Band. OCLC 257853213. ASIN B000YDMOPW.

== Filmography ==
Television
Year	Title	Role	Notes
1969	Hawaii Five-O	Gus	Episode: "The Box"
1970	Hawaii Five-O	John Mala	Episode: "Run Johnny, Run"
1971	Hawaii Five-O	Paul	Episode: "...And I Want Some Candy and a Gun That Shoots"
1971	Hawaii Five-O	Aku	Episode: "Is This Any Way to Run a Paradise?"
1973	Hawaii Five-O	Yoko	Episode: "The Odd Lot Caper"
1973	Hawaii Five-O	Tamaki	Episode: "Charter for Death"
1974	McCloud	Lt. Kelani	Episode: "A Cowboy in Paradise"
1974	The Castaway Cowboy	Malakoma	
1974	Hawaii Five-O	Puni	Episode: "Steal Now, Pay Later"
1975	Hawaii Five-O	Raphael Orduno	Episode: "How to Steal a Submarine"
1977	Hawaii Five-O	Mahina	Episode: "The Descent of the Torches"
1978	Hawaii Five-O	Surfer	Episode: "Angel in Blue"
1979	Hawaii Five-O	Pimp	Episode: "The Execution File"
1979	The Paradise Connection	Manu	
1994	One West Waikiki	Nephi Hanaman	Episode: "Till Death Do Us Part"
1994	One West Waikiki	Nephi Hanaman	Episode 1.3
1994	One West Waikiki	Nephi Hanaman	Episode: "Scales of Justice"
1995	One West Waikiki	Nephi Hanaman	Episode: "Past Due"
1996	One West Waikiki	Nephi Hanaman	Episode: "Guilty"
1996	One West Waikiki	Nephi Hanaman	Episode: "Battle of the Titans"
