= Winterhawk =

1975 film

- Theatrical release poster
- Directed by: Charles B. Pierce
- Written by: Charles B. Pierce; Kalai Strode; Earl E. Smith
- Produced by: Charles B. Pierce
- Starring: Leif Erickson; Woody Strode; Denver Pyle; L.Q. Jones; Elisha Cook Jr. Seamon Glass; Dennis Fimple; Arthur Hunnicutt; Dawn Wells; Michael Dante
- Narrated by: Dawn Wells
- Cinematography: Jim Roberson
- Edited by: Tom Boutross
- Music by: Lee Holdridge; Nicholas Flagello; William Goldstein; Kendall Schmidt
- Distributed by: United States theatrical: Howco International Pictures; Canada theatrical: Frontier Amusements
- Release dates: November 5, 1975 (Minneapolis, Minnesota)
- Running time: 98 mins
- Country: United States
- Language: English
- Budget: $790,000
- Box office: $14 million

Winterhawk is a 1975 American Western film co-written, produced and directed by Charles B. Pierce. Starring Leif Erickson, Woody Strode, Denver Pyle, L.Q. Jones, Michael Dante and Elisha Cook Jr., the story concerns a Blackfoot chief who attempts to get help for his tribe who have been infected by smallpox. He is betrayed by the people from whom he seeks help.

== Plot ==
The film is set in the early 19th century. Winterhawk, a Blackfoot chief, seeks help for his smallpox infected tribe by attempting to trade furs. In a double cross by two outlaws named Gates and Scoby, the furs are stolen and Winterhawk's companions are killed. Following the double cross, Winterhawk and his braves come back to the town. He takes his revenge by kidnapping a white woman named Clayanna, and her young brother Cotton, intending to trade them for medicine for his tribe. He is then pursued by a posse led by his friend Guthrie, a mountain man.

Clayanna and Winterhawk grow close, especially after she finds out he is a widower. Guthrie catches up with Gates and Scoby, killing Gates and taking Scoby captive. The posse tracks Winterhawk to his tribes winter lodgings, where Guthrie and Winterhawk engage in a horse mounted battle with spears. Guthrie's spear glances off of Winterhawk and pierces Cotton, ending the fight.

Cotton survives, and he leaves with Guthrie and the posse after he offers Scoby to Winterhawk so that he might get revenge on him for the double cross. Winterhawk declines, so Guthrie takes Scoby's horse and coat and leaves him to die in the cold. Clayanna decides to stay with Winterhawk and pursue a relationship with him.

== Cast ==
- Leif Erickson as Guthrie
- Woody Strode as "Big Rude"
- Denver Pyle as Arkansas
- L.Q. Jones as Gates
- Elisha Cook Jr. as Finley
- Seamon Glass as "Big" Smith
- Dennis Fimple as Scoby
- Arthur Hunnicutt as McClusky
- Dawn Wells as Clayanna / The Narrator
- Chuck Pierce Jr. as Cotton
- Jimmy Clem as Little Smith
- Sacheen Littlefeather as Pale Flower
- Gilbert Lucero as Crow
- Ace Powell as Red Calf
- Michael Dante as Winterhawk

== Reviews ==
David W. Reid of The Spokesman Review referred to the film as an honest tale. Reviewer Peter Morris of the Milwaukee Sentinel commented on the high standard of cinematography with the surrounding landscape that made it a nature film as well as a lively adventure. Marshall Fine, staff writer for the Lawrence Journal-World, gave a very negative review of the film, and said it had the most unappealing character actors anyone would hope to assemble.
