= 1948 Toronto Argonauts season =

CFL team season

- Head coach: Teddy Morris
- Home stadium: Varsity Stadium

Results
- Record: 5–6–1
- Division place: 3rd, IRFU
- Playoffs: did not qualify

The 1948 Toronto Argonauts finished in third place in the Interprovincial Rugby Football Union with a 5–6–1 record and failed to make the playoffs. American halfback Ken Whitlock played four games to become the Argonauts first black player.

== Regular season ==
=== Standings ===
Interprovincial Rugby Football Union
Team	GP	W	L	T	PF	PA	Pts
Ottawa Rough Riders	12	10	2	0	264	130	20
Montreal Alouettes	12	7	5	0	221	172	14
Toronto Argonauts	12	5	6	1	160	191	11
Hamilton Wildcats	12	1	10	1	88	240	3

=== Schedule ===
Week	Game	Date	Opponent	Results		Venue
Week	Game	Date	Opponent	Score	Record	Venue
1	1	Sept 4	vs. Montreal Alouettes	W 20–7	1–0	Varsity Stadium
1	2	Sept 6	at Hamilton Wildcats	W 14–7	2–0	Civic Stadium
2	3	Sept 11	vs. Hamilton Wildcats	W 25–13	3–0	Varsity Stadium
3	4	Sept 18	vs. Ottawa Rough Riders	L 12–32	3–1	Varsity Stadium
4	5	Sept 25	at Ottawa Rough Riders	L 5–12	3–2	Lansdowne Park
5	6	Oct 2	at Montreal Alouettes	L 8–17	3–3	Delormier Stadium
6	7	Oct 9	vs. Hamilton Wildcats	W 9–7	4–3	Varsity Stadium
6	8	Oct 11	at Hamilton Wildcats	T 8–8	4–3–1	Civic Stadium
7	9	Oct 16	at Ottawa Rough Riders	L 6–41	4–4–1	Lansdowne Park
8	10	Oct 23	vs. Montreal Alouettes	L 17–22	4–5–1	Varsity Stadium
9	11	Oct 30	at Montreal Alouettes	W 24–11	5–5–1	Delorimier Stadium
10	12	Nov 6	vs. Ottawa Rough Riders	L 12–14	5–6–1	Varsity Stadium
