= Return from the River Kwai =

1989 British war film by Andrew McLaglen

- Film poster
- Directed by: Andrew McLaglen
- Screenplay by: Sargon Tamimi; Paul Mayersberg
- Based on: Return from the River Kwai by Joan & Clay Blair Jr.
- Produced by: Kurt Unger
- Starring: Edward Fox; Chris Penn; Denholm Elliott; Timothy Bottoms
- Cinematography: Arthur Wooster
- Edited by: Alan Strachan
- Music by: Lalo Schifrin
- Production companies: Roadshow Productions; Screenlife Establishments
- Distributed by: Rank Film Distributors (UK)
- Release date: 7 April 1989 (UK)
- Running time: 107 minutes
- Country: United Kingdom
- Language: English
- Budget: $15 million or £6.7 million
- Box office: $5 million

Return from the River Kwai is a 1989 British film directed by Andrew McLaglen and starring Edward Fox, Chris Penn and Timothy Bottoms.

It is not a sequel to The Bridge on the River Kwai (1957), though it also deals with POWs of the Japanese in World War II.

== Cast ==
- Edward Fox as Major Benford
- Chris Penn as Lieutenant Crawford
- Denholm Elliott as Colonel Grayson
- Timothy Bottoms as Seaman Miller
- Tatsuya Nakadai as Major Harada (Japanese: 陸軍少佐原田, Rikugun-Shōsa Harada)
- Etsushi Takahashi as Ozawa
- George Takei as Lieutenant Tanaka (Japanese: 陸軍中尉田中, Rikugun-Chūi Tanaka)
- Nick Tate as Lt. Commander Hunt
- Michael Dante as Commander Davidson

== Production ==
The film is based on a 1979 factual book with the same name about a 1944 Japanese prisoner transport of 2,217 British and Australian POWs, who had been working as forced labour on the Burma Railway, building the bridge over the River Kwai. They were taken by railway to Singapore, and from there aboard two ships, Rakuyo Maru and Kachidoki Maru, destined for Japan. On 12 September 1944, both ships were torpedoed by US submarines, and 1,559 of the prisoners perished.

Film rights were bought by Karl Unger. In 1986 Tri-Star agreed to release in the US.

Unger said the film was not a sequel. "It is a story that stands completely on its own, and it is a factual story," he said. "The event is not known in America. It is known in the Pentagon, but not by the general public."

The words "river Kwai" were not mentioned in the film and the river only appeared at the beginning. The bulk of the story concerned what happened to the POWS after the railway was built.

The film was shot in 1988 in the Philippines. According to Unger, "Everyone said, `The Philippines? Are you crazy? They're throwing bombs over there. You can't make movies there'."

Unger did consider filming somewhere else but said he did not think he would have "gotten the kind of infrastructure we did here.... Eighty percent of what we needed was already here. We needed World War II ships, and the Philippine Navy is still using them. We needed a harbor that looks like Saigon in the 1940s. Manila Bay was perfect. We needed World War II planes, and the Philippine Air Force is still using Japanese Zeros as training planes." Unger added, "The other 20% we built ourselves, and we built our own studio in a warehouse in the suburbs.""

In the final event, filming proceeded relatively smoothly.

== Legal problems ==
In 1989 TriStar's parent company, Columbia, was bought out by Sony. They pulled out of the distribution contract to release the film in the US. Columbia claimed that this was because the estate of Sam Spiegel had threatened legal action over the film's title, thus breaching the contract. Unger argued that the rights had been bought by Columbia from the Spiegel estate in 1959.

Unger claimed he offered to change the film's name and attached a disclaimer denying any connection with the Spiegel film. (When released in the United Kingdom, the film carried a disclaimer that it was not related to or a sequel to the 1957 film.)

Unger says he suggested the name "River Kwai" be translated into Thai ("Kwae Noi") and Tri-Star agreed, then changed their mind. Unger claims Tri-Star's decision not to distribute was motivated by the film's anti-Japanese content, which he says offended Sony, its parent company. The producer asked, "What other reason could there be in view of what has happened, when it has happened and the refusal to distribute under a different name a film that was to cost them nothing?"

Unger says the decision cost him a minimum of $5 million in earnings from cable, video and cinema in the US market, and meant the film was unprofitable.

The case went to trial in 1997. Columbia argued that "if you use a name and it becomes famous you are able to use it in a certain area of commerce, such as the exclusive use of River Kwai in the title of a film. It does not matter where Pierre Boulle got the name."

In 1998 a court ruled that the title suggested the film implied it was a sequel to Bridge on the River Kwai. It was never released in the US.

== Box office ==
Unger said the film took $5 million worldwide outside the US.
