= Apache Rifles =

1964 film

- Film poster
- Directed by: William Witney (as William H. Witney)
- Screenplay by: Charles Smith (as Charles B. Smith)
- Story by: Kenneth Gamet; Richard Schayer
- Produced by: Grant Whytock
- Starring: Audie Murphy
- Cinematography: Archie R. Dalzell
- Music by: Richard LaSalle
- Color process: Color by DeLuxe
- Production company: Robert E. Kent Productions
- Distributed by: 20th Century Fox
- Release date: November 26, 1964
- Running time: 92 minutes
- Country: United States
- Language: English

Apache Rifles is a 1964 American Western film directed by William Witney and starring Audie Murphy. The film was shot at Bronson Canyon and Red Rock Canyon State Park, California. It was the first of four Audie Murphy films for producer Grant Whylock's Admiral Pictures.

== Plot ==
Captain Stanton is a renowned Indian Fighter who harbors a deep and abiding animosity for Indians, because his career officer father was forced to resign after trusting a group of Indians who broke their word to him. Stanton is sent into the field to relieve a troop commander who has been unsuccessfully hunting an Apache band that fled their reservation. Stanton quickly meets with success by having the troop drop their excess equipment to move faster and longer. He defeats a small Apache war party by luring them to attack an unescorted wagon manned by experienced soldiers hidden in it. They successfully engage the Indians until Stanton's mounted troop comes up to drive them off. In the melee, Red Hawk, the son of Chief Victorio is captured. Stanton uses him to negotiate a truce: the Apaches promise to return to their reservation in exchange for white miners being removed from the reservation and not trespassing on their land. During the negotiation, Stanton becomes acquainted with Dawn Gillis, a female missionary who willingly travels with the Apache band.

Though the territory remains peaceful, there is seething animosity against the Indians: miners faces a serious economic threat when they cannot repay their grubstakes, because they are denied access to their mines.

Captain Stanton's sympathies gradually change when the miners continue their trespassing. He also is attracted to Dawn Gillis, a courageous missionary teacher who is half Indian herself, and teaches in an Indian school. Stanton endangers his military career by striking a local troublemaker who makes racist taunts to Dawn. Later, Stanton confronts a group of whites who massacre a group of Indians at the school; that leads to Stanton firing on the whites, killing several.

In these tense circumstances, a political territorial delegation complains to the federal government in Washington D.C. about Stanton's behavior and the dire economic circumstances in the Arizona territory, resulting in the appointment of a new commander, Colonel Perry. The Colonel not only relieves Stanton but dismantles his line of outposts that had been monitoring the entry of whites into the reservation. Predictably, this enables the miners to swarm back into the restricted areas. Also, the Indian agent is killed, being shot in the back by an Indian arrow.

Hostilities resume with the Indians making significant attacks on white settlements. Colonel Perry takes his command into the field to confront the Indians, but Victorio's Apaches lure the Colonel and his men into an ambush. A messenger from the surrounded soldiers escapes to the fort and the remnants of the Colonel's command. Now, it is Stanton that takes charge. He knows that he has only a few soldiers with the only real relief available in Tucson. He also understands that the murder of the Indian agent, which set off the events that led to renewed hostilities with the Indians, was orchestrated, since the arrow that killed the agent was Arapahoe not Apache as well as being bent out of shape and unshootable. Stanton resolves to sneak into town and get proof of his suspicions. In this way, he hopes to straighten out the mess.

Stanton discovers the murderer and returns with him to the surrounded Captain Perry, where the murderer confesses. Stanton then leaves the surrounded soldiers to contact Victorio and explain to him what happened. Although, Victorio has died, Stanton succeeds in arriving at a truce with his son, Red Hawk, the new Indian chief. In the end, the Indians agree to move to Texas to make a new beginning and Stanton goes to Dawn Gillis, who is waiting for him.

== Cast ==
- Audie Murphy as Jeff Stanton
- Michael Dante as Red Hawk
- Linda Lawson as Dawn Gillis
- L. Q. Jones as Mike Greer
- Ken Lynch as Hodges
- Joseph Vitale as Victorio (as Joseph A. Vitale)
- Robert Brubaker as Sgt. Cobb
- Eugene Iglesias as Cpl. Ramirez
- J. Pat O'Malley as Captain Thatcher
- John Archer as Col. Perry
- Charles Watts as Crawford Owens
- Howard Wright as Thompson
- Peter Hansen as Capt. Green
- Robert Karnes as Sheriff
- Hugh Sanders as Arizona Delegate
- Sydney Smith as General of the Army
- S. John Launer as Gen. Nelson
- Robert B. Williams as Miller
