= Phil Scott (American football) =

American football player (1906–1975)

Profile
- Position: End

Personal information
- Born: April 11, 1906; Drakes Branch, Virginia, US
- Died: January 1, 1975 (aged 68); Montclair, New Jersey, US

Career history
- Orange Tornadoes (1929)

Career statistics
- Games: 8
- Games started: 6

Phillip Major Scott Sr. (April 11, 1906 – January 1, 1975) was an American football player. He was one of the few black players in professional American football prior to World War II.

Scott was born in 1906 in Drakes Branch, Virginia. During the 1928 season, he played American football as an end for the Orange Athletic Club. The following year, he played in the National Football League (NFL) as an end for the Orange Tornadoes. He appeared in eight NFL games, six as a starter, during the 1929 season. The 1929 Tornadoes assigned letters rather than numbers to player jerseys for identification. Scott wore the letter "A".

Scott was married to Agnes Antoinette Harper in 1928. He had three daughters, Roberta, Elaine, and Allison, and two sons, Philip and Whitfield. At the time of the 1940 census, Scott was employed as a chauffeur for a private family in Montclair, New Jersey. He also worked in the landscaping business and occasionally as a maintenance man. He lived in Montclair for over 50 years. He was a member of St. Paul's Baptist Church in Montclair.

Scott died in Montclair in 1975 at age 68.
