= Forgotten Four: The Integration of Pro Football =

- Written by: Aaron Cohen
- Directed by: Johnson McKelvy
- Narrated by: Jeffrey Wright
- Country of origin: United States
- Original language: English

Production
- Producer: Ross Greenburg
- Running time: 60 minutes
- Production companies: EPIX, Ross Greenburg Productions

Original release
- Release: September 23, 2014

Forgotten Four: The Integration of Pro Football is a documentary about athletes Kenny Washington, Woody Strode, Marion Motley and Bill Willis. They helped break down the barriers that existed for black athletes in professional football. It was written by Aaron Cohen and directed by Johnson McKelvy. The film's producer was Ross Greenburg.
