= Woody Strode =

American athlete and actor (1914–1994)

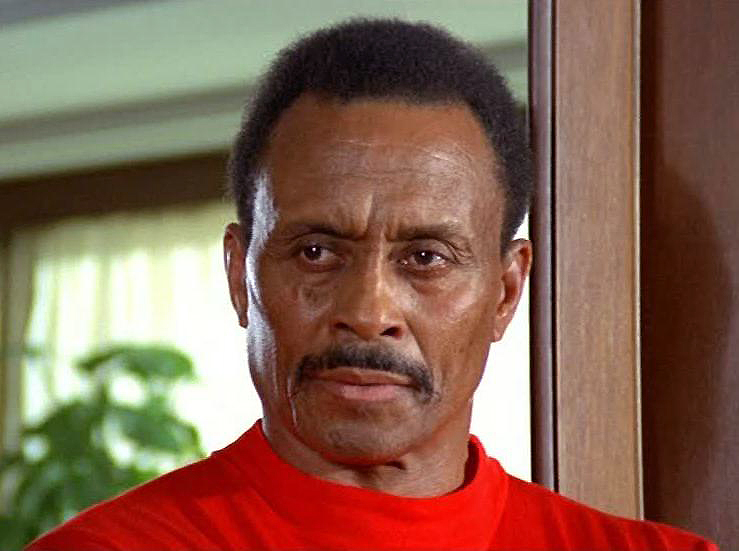
- Strode in The Italian Connection (1972)
- Born: Woodrow Wilson Woolwine Strode; July 25, 1914; Los Angeles, California, U.S.
- Died: December 31, 1994 (aged 80); Glendora, California, U.S.
- Occupations: Actor; football player; author
- Years active: 1941–1994
- Spouses: Luukialuana Kalaeloa (died 1980) Tina Tompson (m. 1982)
- Children: 2, including Kalai
- Football career

No. 15, 17, 39, 42
- Position: End

Personal information
- Listed height: 6 ft 4 in (1.93 m)
- Listed weight: 205 lb (93 kg)

Career information
- High school: Thomas Jefferson (CA)
- College: UCLA

Career history
- Hollywood Bears (1940–1942, 1945); Los Angeles Rams (1946); Calgary Stampeders (1948–1950)

Awards and highlights
- Grey Cup champion (1948); 2× CFL West All-Star (1948, 1949); First-team All-PCC (1939); Second-team All-PCC (1937)

Career NFL statistics
- Games played: 10
- Receptions: 4
- Receiving yards: 37
- Stats at Pro Football Reference
- Military career
- Branch: United States Army Air Corps

Woodrow Wilson Woolwine Strode (July 25, 1914 – December 31, 1994) was an American athlete, actor, and author. He was a decathlete and football star who was one of the first Black American players in the National Football League (NFL) in the postwar era. After football, he went on to become a film actor, where he was nominated for a Golden Globe Award for Best Supporting Actor for his role in Spartacus in 1960.

== Early life and athletic career ==
Strode was born in Los Angeles. His parents were from New Orleans; one grandmother was of African-American and Cherokee descent, his grandfather was an African-American and his other grandmother was of Creek descent.

He attended Thomas Jefferson High School in South East Los Angeles and college at UCLA, where he was a member of Alpha Phi Alpha fraternity. His world-class decathlon capabilities were spearheaded by a 50 ft (15 m) plus shot put (when the world record was 57 ft (17 m)) and a 6 ft 5 in (1.96 m) high jump (the world record at time was 6 ft 10 in (2.08 m)).

"I got a cultural education—majored in history and education," he said in a 1971 interview. "Never used it, but I could walk into the White House with it now."

Strode posed for a nude portrait, part of Hubert Stowitts's acclaimed exhibition of athletic portraits shown at the 1936 Berlin Olympics (although the inclusion of black and Jewish athletes caused the Nazis to close the exhibit).

=== College career ===
Strode, Kenny Washington, and Jackie Robinson starred on the undefeated 1939 UCLA Bruins football team, in which they made up three of the four backfield players. They became famous nationally as "the Gold Dust gang".

Along with Ray Bartlett, there were four Black Americans playing for the Bruins, when only a few dozen at all played on other college football teams. They played eventual conference and Helms national champion USC to a scoreless tie with those championships and 1940 Rose Bowl on the line. It was the first UCLA–USC rivalry football game with national implications.

Strode was also an All-American thrower for the UCLA Bruins track and field team, finishing 4th in the shot put at the 1938 NCAA track and field championships.

=== Early acting appearances ===
Strode made his first film appearance in Sundown (1941), playing a native policeman. He had a small role in Star Spangled Rhythm (1942), as a chauffeur of Rochester (Edward Anderson), and could be glimpsed in No Time for Love (1943).

=== Professional football career ===
When World War II broke out, Strode was playing for the Hollywood Bears in the Pacific Coast Professional Football League. He was drafted at age 27 and soon joined the United States Army Air Corps and spent the war unloading bombs in Guam and the Marianas, as well as playing on the Army football team at March Field in Riverside, California.

After the war, he worked at serving subpoenas and escorting prisoners for the L.A. County District Attorney's Office. Strode and Kenny Washington were two of the first African Americans to play in major college programs and later the modern National Football League (along with Marion Motley and Bill Willis, who signed with the contemporary rival All-America Football Conference), playing for the Los Angeles Rams in 1946. No black men had played in the NFL from 1933 to 1946. UCLA teammate Jackie Robinson would go on to break the color barrier in Major League Baseball (in fact, Robinson, Strode, and Washington had all played in the semi-professional Pacific Coast Professional Football League earlier in the decade).

Around the year 1939, Strode, Washington and Robinson provided the UCLA with one of its best seasons in American Football. This had given the three a boost in fame, with fans referring to them as "The Gold Dust Gang". Woody Strode was one of the end position players while Kenny was a running back. Unable to join professional football at the time, the two participated as semi-professional players for the Hollywood Bears.

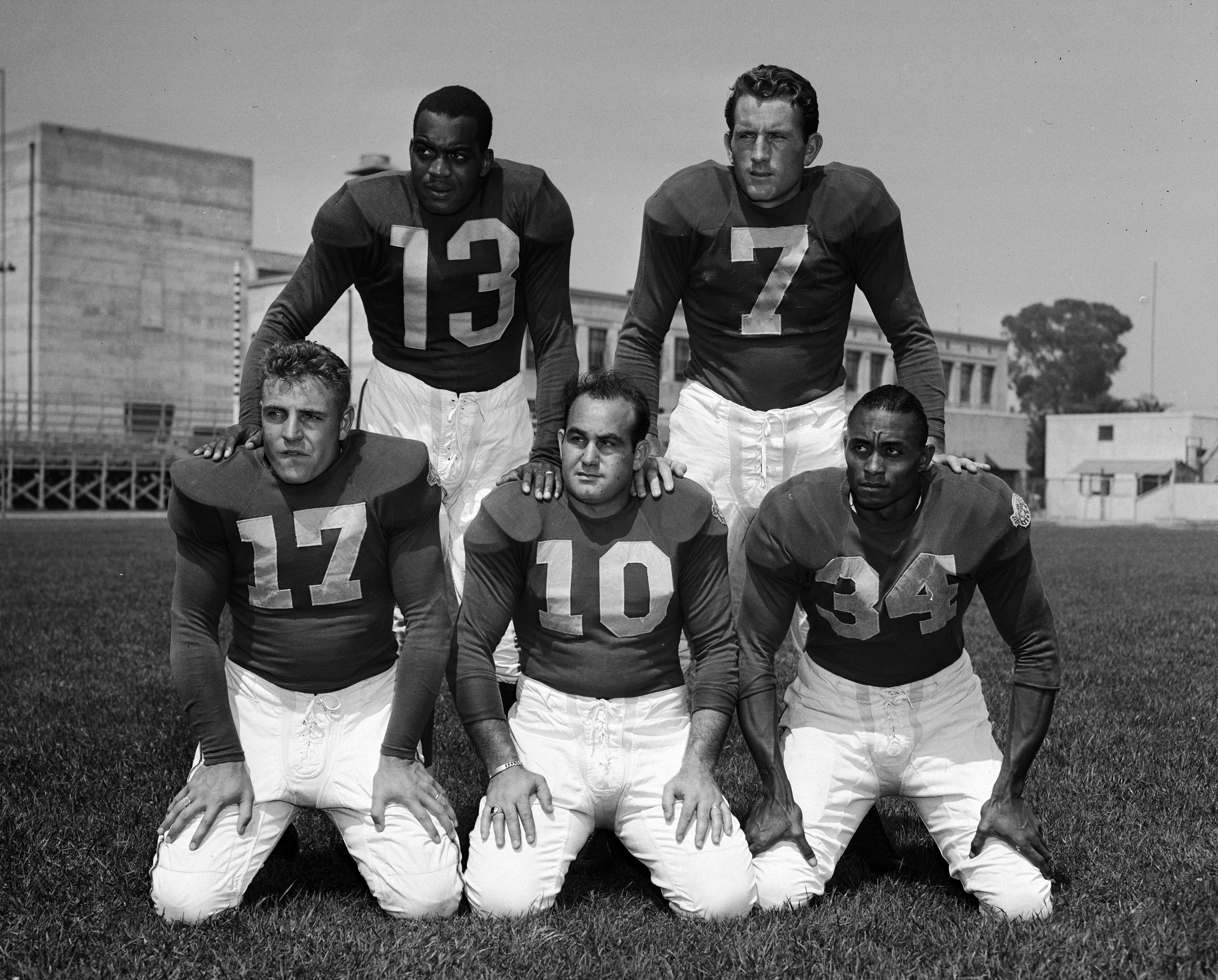
UCLA football alumni Woody Strode (#34), Kenny Washington (#13), and others

When out on the road with the team, Strode had his first experience with racism, something he wasn't aware of growing up in Los Angeles. "We were unconscious of color. We used to sit in the best seats at the Coconut Grove (a nightclub in the Ambassador Hotel) listening to Donald Novis sing. If someone said, 'there's a Negro over there,' I was just as apt as anyone to turn around and say 'Where?'" He also said, "On the Pacific Coast there wasn't anything we couldn't do. As we got out of the L.A. area we found these racial tensions. Hell, we thought we were white." One instance where he became the victim of a racial barrier was when the National Football League acted in response to Caucasian players complaining about African Americans taking up job opportunities.

In 1948, he signed with the Brooklyn Dodgers of the AAFC, but was released before the season started, whereupon he joined the Calgary Stampeders of the Western Interprovincial Football Union in Canada, where he was a member of Calgary's 1948 Grey Cup Championship team before retiring due to injury in 1949. He broke two ribs and a shoulder. "It was like I had fought Joe Louis," he recalled.

=== Professional wrestling career ===
In 1941, Strode had dabbled for several months in professional wrestling. Following the end of his football career in 1949, he returned to wrestling part-time between acting jobs until 1962, wrestling the likes of Gorgeous George.

In 1952, Strode wrestled almost every week from August 12, 1952, to December 10, 1952, in different cities in California. He was billed as the Pacific Coast Heavyweight Wrestling Champion and the Pacific Coast Negro Heavyweight Wrestling Champion in 1962. He later teamed up with both Bobo Brazil and Bearcat Wright.

== Acting career ==
Strode's acting career was re-activated when producer Walter Mirisch spotted him wrestling and cast him as an African warrior in The Lion Hunters (1951), one of the Bomba the Jungle Boy series. They wanted him to shave his head. He was reluctant until they offered him $500 a week. "I said, 'All right, where are the pluckers?'" Then Strode realised: "I was out in the world market with a bald head. Trapped for life. Finally, it became way of life." He had roles in Bride of the Gorilla (1951), African Treasure (1951) (another Bomba film), an episode of Dangerous Assignment (1952), Caribbean (1952), and Androcles and the Lion (1952), playing the lion, "the toughest job I ever had," he said later.

Strode was in City Beneath the Sea (1953) with Robert Ryan and Anthony Quinn, directed by Budd Boetticher, and The Royal African Rifles. Additionally, he appeared in several episodes of the 1952–1954 television series Ramar of the Jungle, where he portrayed an African warrior. Strode was a gladiator in Demetrius and the Gladiators (1954) and was in Jungle Man-Eaters (1954), a Jungle Jim film. He could be seen in The Gambler from Natchez (1954), Jungle Gents (1954) a Bowery Boys movie set in Africa, and The Silver Chalice (1954). He was in a TV adaptation of Mandrake the Magician (1954), a pilot for a series not picked up, and had small parts in Son of Sinbad (1955), Soldiers of Fortune (1955), and Buruuba (1956) a Japanese film set in Africa. He appeared once on Johnny Weissmuller's 1955–1956 syndicated television series Jungle Jim and was in an episode of Private Secretary.

Cecil B. DeMille cast him in The Ten Commandments (1956) as a slave at $500 a week for five weeks. They were unable to find anyone to play the Ethiopian king so Strode was given that role too.

He had a support role in Tarzan's Fight for Life (1958) and a small part in The Buccaneer (1958). In 1959 he portrayed the conflicted, some would say cowardly, Private Franklin in Pork Chop Hill, which brought him critical acclaim. He called it "the first dramatic thing that I had done." He guest starred on The Man from Blackhawk (1960).

=== Rising fame ===
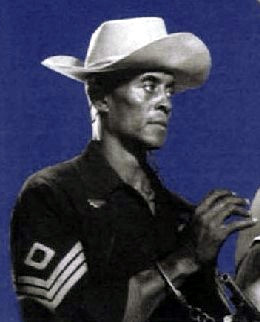
Strode as Sergeant Rutledge

Strode was next cast in Spartacus (1960) as the Ethiopian gladiator Draba, in which he has to fight Spartacus (played by Kirk Douglas) to the death. Draba wins the contest, but instead of killing Spartacus, he attacks the Roman military commander who paid for the fight. He is killed and his death sparks a gladiator rebellion. Despite his brief time on screen, Strode's performance was highly praised, earning him a nomination for the Golden Globe for Best Supporting Actor.

Strode had an excellent support part in The Last Voyage (1960) playing an heroic stoker, though he was only billed fifth.

While making Pork Chop Hill he became a close friend of director John Ford. Ford gave Strode the title role in Sergeant Rutledge (1960) as a member of the Ninth Cavalry, who is greatly admired by the other black soldiers in the unit and is falsely accused of the rape and murder of a white woman.

"The big studios wanted an actor like Sidney [Poitier] or [Harry] Belafonte," recalled Strode. "And this is not being facetious, but Mr. Ford defended me; and I don't know that this is going on. He said, "Well, they're not tough enough to do what I want Sergeant Rutledge to be."

"That was a classic," he later said. "It had dignity. John Ford put classic words in my mouth... You never seen a Negro come off a mountain like John Wayne before. I had the greatest Glory Hallelujah ride across the Pecos River that any black man ever had on the screen. And I did it myself. I carried the whole black race across that river."

Strode had difficulty maintaining the momentum of these roles. He was in The Sins of Rachel Cade (1961) and guest starred twice on Rawhide, playing an Australian aboriginal in one episode and a buffalo soldier in the other. Ford used him again in Two Rode Together (1962) but it was only a small part, as an Indian. He had a bigger role in The Man Who Shot Liberty Valance (1962) for Ford, playing Pompey, John Wayne's hired hand. In the film, Strode's character recites the Declaration of Independence but apologizes for forgetting the phrase "all men are created equal", a poignant line for the 1962 audience. Pompey/Strode physically carries and thereby saves a drunken, suicidal John Wayne from his burning home.

In 1963, he was cast opposite Jock Mahoney's Tarzan as both the dying leader of an unnamed Asian country and that leader's unsavory brother, Khan, in Tarzan's Three Challenges. He guest starred on The Lieutenant, The Farmer's Daughter and Daniel Boone and had roles in the features Genghis Khan (1965) and 7 Women (1966), the latter the last film he made for Ford. Strode was very close to the director. "He treated me like a son," said Strode. "I had a certain amount of crudeness that went back a hundred years, and that's what he liked."

During Ford's declining years Strode spent four months sleeping on the director's floor as his caregiver, and he was later present at Ford's death.

In the late 1960s, he appeared in several episodes of the Ron Ely Tarzan television series. Strode's other television work included a role as the Grand Mogul in the Batman episodes "Marsha, Queen of Diamonds" and "Marsha's Scheme of Diamonds".

Strode landed a major starring role as a Bounty Hunter and soldier of fortune in the 1966 Western The Professionals. His name was the only one of the four "professionals" which was left off the movie poster; nevertheless, the film was a major box-office success establishing him as a recognizable star.

In 1967, he attempted to produce his own film, The Story of the Tenth Cavalry, but it was not made.

He based himself in Europe from 1968 to 1971.

=== Europe ===
His 1968 starring role as a thinly-disguised Patrice Lumumba in Seduto alla sua destra (released in the U.S. as Black Jesus) garnered Strode a great deal of press at the time, but the film is largely forgotten now. He was an Indian in Shalako (1968) and played a gunslinger in the opening sequence of Sergio Leone's Once Upon a Time in the West (1968). He decided to stay in Europe. "I had five pairs of blue jeans, I was lonely, and I didn't speak the language," he said. "But the producers answered, 'Not necessary. You ride horses.'"

Strode was in Che! (1969) and supported Terence Hill and Bud Spencer in Boot Hill (1969) shot in Italy. He stayed in Europe to make another Western The Unholy Four (1970) and went back to Hollywood to do a TV movie Breakout (1970) and two Westerns The Deserter (also known as "The Devil's Backbone") (1971), and The Gatling Gun (1971). The scripts for these were variable but Strode later said "Me, I didn't care. If the money was right, I'd play Mickey Mouse.”

Strode went to Europe to make Scipio the African (1971) and did some more Westerns: The Last Rebel (1971), and The Revengers (1972) (a "regular knockdown, drag‐out western", said Strode). He later said his salary in Italy went up to $10,000 a week. He did The Italian Connection (1972), for which he was paid $150,000. "Race is not a factor in the world market," he said in 1981. "I once played a part written for an Irish prize fighter. I've done everything but play an Anglo-Saxon. I'd do that if I could. I'd play a Viking with blue contact lenses and a blond wig if I could. My dream is to play a Mexican bandit in the international market."

He also appeared in Key West (1973), Loaded Guns (1975), The Manhunter (1975), We Are No Angels (1975), Winterhawk (1975), Keoma (1976), episodes of The Quest (1976) and How the West Was Won (1977), Oil (1977), Martinelli, Outside Man (1977), Kingdom of the Spiders (1977), Cowboy-San! (1978), Ravagers (1979), Jaguar Lives! (1979), and an episode of Buck Rogers in the 25th Century (1979).

=== Later career ===
Strode's later appearances included Cuba Crossing (1980),The Dukes of Hazzard (1980), Scream (1981), Fantasy Island (1981), Vigilante (1982), Invaders of the Lost Gold (1982), Angkor: Cambodia Express (1983), The Black Stallion Returns (1983), The Violent Breed (1984), Jungle Warriors (1984), The Cotton Club (1984), The Final Executioner (1984), Lust in the Dust (1985), On Fire (1987), and A Gathering of Old Men (1987). He was in Storyville (1992), and Posse (1992), working with director Mario Van Peebles. His last film was The Quick and the Dead (1995), which starred Sharon Stone, Gene Hackman, Leonardo DiCaprio, and Russell Crowe. The closing credits dedicate the film to Strode, who died shortly before its release.

In 1980, Strode was inducted into the Black Filmmakers Hall of Fame. In 2021, he was inducted into the Hall of Great Westerners of the National Cowboy & Western Heritage Museum.

== Personal life and death ==
His first wife was Princess Luukialuana Kalaeloa (a.k.a. Luana Strode), a distant relative of Liliuokalani, the last queen of Hawaii. "You'd have thought I was marrying Lana Turner, the way the whites in Hollywood acted," he later said.

With her he had two children: a son, television director Kalai (a.k.a. Kalaeloa, 1946–2014), and a daughter, June. They were married until her death in 1980 from Parkinson's disease. In 1982, at the age of 68, he wed 35-year-old Tina Tompson and they remained married until his death from lung cancer on December 31, 1994, in Glendora, California, aged 80. He is buried at Riverside National Cemetery in Riverside, California.

Strode was a dedicated martial artist under the direction of Frank Landers in the art of Seishindo Kenpo.

== Tributes ==
Sheriff Woody of the Toy Story series of animated films is named after Strode, as was the recurring character of the Santa Barbara Coroner in the television series Psych.

== Championships and accomplishments ==
- Cauliflower Alley Club
  - Iron Mike Mazurki Award (1992)

== Filmography ==
- 1941 Sundown as Tribal Policeman (uncredited)
- 1942 Star Spangled Rhythm as Woodrow, Rochester's Motorcycle Chauffeur (uncredited)
- 1943 No Time for Love as Black Sandhog (uncredited)
- 1951 The Lion Hunters as Walu
- 1951 Bride of the Gorilla as Nedo, Policeman
- 1952 African Treasure as Mailman (uncredited)
- 1952 Caribbean as Esau, MacAllister Guard
- 1952 Androcles and the Lion as The Lion
- 1953 City Beneath the Sea as Djion
- 1953 The Royal African Rifles as Soldier
- 1954 Jungle Man-Eaters as One of Native Escorts to Biplane (uncredited)
- 1954 Demetrius and the Gladiators as Gladiator (uncredited)
- 1954 The Gambler from Natchez as Josh
- 1954 Jungle Gents as Malaka (uncredited)
- 1955 Son of Sinbad as Palace Guard (uncredited)
- 1955 Buruuba as Native Chief
- 1956 The Ten Commandments as King of Ethiopia and Bythia's Bearer
- 1958 Tarzan's Fight for Life as Ramo
- 1958 The Buccaneer as Toro
- 1959 Pork Chop Hill as Private Franklin
- 1960 The Last Voyage as Hank Lawson
- 1960 Sergeant Rutledge as First Sergeant Braxton Rutledge
- 1960 Spartacus as Draba
- 1961 The Sins of Rachel Cade as Muwango
- 1961 Two Rode Together as Stone Calf
- 1962 The Man Who Shot Liberty Valance as Pompey
- 1963 Tarzan's Three Challenges as Khan / Dying Leader
- 1965 Genghis Khan as Sengal
- 1966 7 Women as Lean Warrior
- 1966 The Professionals as Jake
- 1968 Seduto alla sua destra, aka Black Jesus, aka Super Brother as Maurice Lalubi
- 1968 Shalako as Chato
- 1968 Once Upon a Time in the West as Stony, Member of Frank's Gang
- 1969 Che! as Guillermo
- 1969 Boot Hill as Thomas
- 1970 Chuck Mool as Woody
- 1971 The Deserter as Jackson
- 1971 The Gatling Gun as Runner the Scout
- 1971 Scipio the African as Massinissa, re di Numidia
- 1971 The Last Rebel as Duncan
- 1972 Black Rodeo (Documentary) as The Narrator
- 1972 The Revengers as Job
- 1972 The Italian Connection as Frank Webster
- 1975 Loaded Guns as Silvera
- 1975 We Are No Angels as Bill "Black Bill"
- 1975 Winterhawk as "Big Rude"
- 1976 Keoma as George
- 1977 Oil! as Ben
- 1977 Kingdom of the Spiders as Walter Colby
- 1978 Cowboy-San! as Baddie
- 1979 Ravagers as Brown
- 1979 Jaguar Lives! as Sensei
- 1980 Cuba Crossing as Titi
- 1981 Scream as Charlie Winters
- 1982 Angkor: Cambodia Express as Woody
- 1982 Invaders of the Lost Gold as Cal
- 1982 Vigilante as Rake
- 1983 The Black Stallion Returns as Meslar
- 1984 The Violent Breed as Polo
- 1984 The Final Executioner as Sam
- 1984 Jungle Warriors as Luther
- 1984 The Cotton Club as Holmes
- 1985 Lust in the Dust as Blackman, Hard Case Gang
- 1987 A Gathering of Old Men as Yank
- 1989 The Bronx Executioner as Sheriff Warren (archive footage)
- 1992 Storyville as Charlie Sumpter
- 1993 Posse as Storyteller
- 1995 The Quick and the Dead as Charlie Moonlight

=== Television ===
Year	Title	Role	Notes
1955	Soldiers of Fortune	Gulio	S1:E28, "Drums of Far Island"
1955	Jungle Jim	Zanguma	S1:E11, "The Leopard's Paw"
1956	Private Secretary	Actor	S4:E10, "In Darkest Manhattan"
1960	The Man from Blackhawk	Tego	S1:E15, "The Savage"
1961	Rawhide	Corporal Gabe Washington	S3:E10, "Incident of the Buffalo Soldier"
1961	Rawhide	Binnaburra	S3:E20, "Incident of the Boomerang"
1964	The Lieutenant	Sgt. Logan Holt	S1:E21, "To Set It Right"
1964	The Farmer's Daughter	Instructor	S1:E34, "My Son, the Athlete"
1966	Daniel Boone	Goliath	S3:E3, "Goliath"
1966	Batman	Grand Mogul	S2:E23, "Marsha, Queen of Diamonds"
1966	Batman	Grand Mogul	S2:E24, "Marsha's Scheme of Diamonds"
1966	Tarzan	Jamoya	S1:E6, "The Faces of Death"
1966	Tarzan	Sgt. Marshak	S1:E8, "The Deadly Silence: Part 1"
1966	Tarzan	Sgt. Marshak	S1:E9, "The Deadly Silence: Part 2"
1967	Tarzan	Chaka	S1:E26, "The Perils of Charity Jones: Part 1"
1967	Tarzan	Chaka	S1:E27, "The Perils of Charity Jones: Part 2"
1968	Tarzan	Bangu	S2:E20, "End of a Challenge"
1975	The Manhunter	Ernie Sutton	S1:E22, "Trial by Error"
1977	How the West Was Won	Arapaho Chief	S1:E3, "Bowie John Christie"
1979	Buck Rogers in the 25th Century	Sgt. 'Big Red' MacMurthy	S1:E6, "Return of the Fighting 69th"
1980	The Dukes of Hazzard	Willie	S3:E9, "The Great Santa Claus Chase"
1981	Fantasy Island	Makalo	S4:E19, "The Proxy Billionaire/The Experiment"

== Author ==
- Strode wrote an autobiography titled Goal Dust (ISBN 0-8191-7680-X).

== See also ==
- List of gridiron football players who became professional wrestlers
