= Box-office bomb =

Film considered unprofitable or unsuccessful

A box-office bomb (Note: Also known as a box-office flop, box-office failure, or box-office disaster.) is a film that is unprofitable or considered highly unsuccessful during its theatrical run. Any film for which the combined production budget, marketing, and distribution costs exceed the revenue after release is often considered a commercial failure, but the terms "bomb" or "flop" are most frequently used for major studio releases that were highly anticipated, extensively marketed, and expensive to produce, but nevertheless failed commercially.

A film can fail at the box office for a variety of reasons, including poor marketing or word of mouth, an excessive production budget which proves to be difficult to earn back during the film's initial theatrical run, or simply a lack of public interest. Extenuating circumstances such as release timing or world events (such as the COVID-19 pandemic) have also affected film ticket sales. Some films may recover from box office failures through other revenue sources, such as home media sales.

Originally, the term "box-office bomb" had the opposite meaning, referring instead to a successful film that "exploded" at the box office. The term continued to be used this way in the United Kingdom into the 1970s.

== Causes ==
=== Negative word of mouth ===
With the advent of social media platforms such as Facebook and Twitter in the 2000s, word of mouth regarding new films is easily spread and has had a marked effect on box office performance. A film's ability or failure to attract positive or negative commentary can strongly impact its performance at the box office, especially on the opening weekend. In the case of Universal's 2026 sex comedy film One Night Only, "despite having a bigger social media universe in its opening weekend at 355M across TikTok, X, YouTube, Facebook and Instagram than It Ends With Us (337M) and Anyone But You (99M)," it flopped at the box office following “mixed-negative leaning chatter" that questioned "the dystopian dating premise", according to social media analytics firm RelishMix.

=== External circumstances ===
Occasionally, films may underperform because of issues largely unrelated to the content of the film, such as the timing of the film's release. This was one of the reasons given for the commercial failure of Intolerance, D. W. Griffith's follow-up to The Birth of a Nation. Owing to production delays, the film was not released until late 1916, when the widespread antiwar sentiment it reflected had started to shift in favor of American entry into World War I. Another example is the 2015 docudrama about FIFA entitled United Passions. A glowing portrayal of FIFA, which had mostly funded the film, United Passions was released in theaters in the United States at the same time FIFA's leaders were under investigation for fraud and corruption. The film grossed only $918 at the US box office in its opening weekend.

Sometimes, a film's performance may be adversely affected by national or global crisis or a disaster, such as the September 11 attacks in 2001, Hurricane Harvey in 2017, and the COVID-19 pandemic in 2020–2021.

=== High production costs ===
Box-office gross numbers are not always reflective of profit as not all money is returned to the film studio. Some of the gross is kept by the film exhibitors and the film distributor. A rule of thumb for making an estimate of a studio's portion of the gross is that the studio usually gets half.

Sometimes a film will fail financially, even when it performs reasonably well at the box office. For the 2005 film Sahara, its budget ballooned to US$281.2 million for production, distribution, and other expenses. The film earned US$119 million in theaters and US$202.9 million overall with television and other subsidies included, resulting in a net loss of US$78.3 million. In 2012, Disney reported losses of US$200 million on John Carter. The film had made a considerable US$234 million worldwide, but this was short of its $250 million budget plus worldwide advertising.

The 2007 film The Golden Compass had a production budget of US$180 million. To be able to fund the film, New Line Cinema had to sell all of the film's international distribution rights to various film distributors around the world. The film underperformed domestically, but was an international success; New Line Cinema did not have a cut of the international box office. These events were major factors in New Line Cinema becoming a division of Warner Bros. Pictures.

== Recovery ==
Films initially thought of as "flops" may recover income elsewhere. Several films have underperformed in their countries of origin, but have been sufficiently successful internationally to recoup losses or even become financial successes. Films may also recover money through international distribution, sales to television syndication, distribution outside of cinemas, and releases on home media. The 1995 post-apocalyptic action film Waterworld was the most expensive film ever made at the time after undergoing significant production difficulties. While it performed relatively well in the US box office, it did not initially turn a profit and became known as a box-office flop. International box-office takings and video sales led it to turn a profit.

Other films have succeeded long after cinema release by becoming cult films or being re-evaluated over time. High-profile films fitting this description include Vertigo, Blade Runner, The Wizard of Oz, It's a Wonderful Life, Citizen Kane, The Shawshank Redemption, Showgirls, Fight Club, The Thing, and Scott Pilgrim vs. the World, all of which initially lost money at the box office but have since become popular.

== Studio failure ==
It is common for a single film's lackluster performance to push its studio into the red, in the sense of recording a net loss on its income statement. In extreme cases, a bomb may push its studio into bankruptcy or closure. Examples of this include Universal (Sutter's Gold, a 1936 fiasco that prompted a wholesale reorganization of the company, and forced studio head Carl Laemmle out of the industry altogether); United Artists (Heaven's Gate); and Carolco Pictures (Cutthroat Island). The Golden Compass was a success at the international box office and grossed $372 million worldwide; nonetheless, its underperformance at the box office in North America was seen as a significant factor in influencing the decision by Warner Bros. Pictures to take direct control of New Line Cinema.

In 2001, Square Pictures, a division of the Japanese video game company Square, released its only film, Final Fantasy: The Spirits Within. It received mixed reviews from critics and failed to recover its $145 million cost. Following the film's struggles, Square Pictures did not make any more films and is now a consolidated subsidiary of Square Enix as Visual Works.

== Independent films ==
The 2006 independent film Zyzzyx Road made $30 at the US box office. With a budget of $1.2 million and starring Tom Sizemore and Katherine Heigl, its box office revenue was limited to six days in a single theater in Dallas for the purpose of meeting Screen Actors Guild requirements. According to co-star Leo Grillo, it sold six tickets, two of which were to cast members.

The 2000 British film Offending Angels took in less than £100 (~$150) at the box office. It had a £70,000 (~$105,000) budget and was panned by critics, including the BBC, who called it a "truly awful pile of garbage", and Total Film, who called it "irredeemable".

== See also ==
- Hollywood accounting
- List of biggest box-office bombs
- List of films considered the worst
