= Torment (1986 film) =

- Theatrical release poster
- Directed by: Samson Aslanian; John Hopkins
- Written by: Samson Aslanian; John Hopkins
- Produced by: Samson Aslanian; John Hopkins
- Starring: Taylor Gilbert; William Witt; Eve Brenner
- Cinematography: Stephen Carpenter
- Edited by: John Penney; Earl Ghaffari; Bret Shelton
- Music by: Christopher Young
- Distributed by: New World Pictures
- Release date: April 18, 1986
- Running time: 85 minutes
- Country: United States
- Language: English
- Budget: $160,000

Torment is a 1986 American psychological horror film directed by Samson Aslanian and John Hopkins, and starring Taylor Gilbert, William Witt, and Eve Brenner. Its plot follows a young woman in San Francisco who is stalked by a sadistic killer while visiting the estate of her future mother-in-law. Released in the spring of 1986 by New World Pictures, the film received moderate critical praise, with numerous critics esteeming the intelligence of its screenplay, and several comparing it positively to Halloween (1978).

== Plot ==
Bob, a lascivious middle-aged man, arrives in San Francisco and begins a string of serial killings, targeting young women. The first is Diane, whom he meets at a bar. When she rejects him, he breaks into her house and shoots her and her boyfriend Barry to death. A short time later, a second victim's corpse is found floating in the San Francisco Bay. Detective Michael Courtland begins investigating the series of killings, which he suspects are related. Obsessed with solving the case, Michael decides to postpone his impending marriage to his fiancée, Jennifer, by two weeks.

Jennifer is invited to stay with Michael's wheelchair-using mother in the interim at her spacious mansion outside the city. Jennifer is apprehensive initially, but takes the opportunity to get to know Mrs. Courtland better. Unbeknownst to them, Bob has been casing the home. On Jennifer's first night there, he breaks in and watches her sleep before entering Mrs. Courtland's room. Mrs. Courtland awakens Jennifer, screaming, claiming someone was in her room. Jennifer dismisses this as a nightmare given that Mrs. Courtland had suffered a break-in some years prior. A paranoid Mrs. Courtland calls the police, but they find no evidence of a trespasser. It soon becomes clear to Jennifer that Mrs. Courtland is obsessive about protecting her home, compulsively checking that all doors and windows are locked.

In the morning, the housekeeper Helen arrives on the property, and is stabbed to death by Bob moments after entering the house. While Jennifer takes the car to run errands, Mrs. Courtland is attacked by Bob, who threatens her with a pistol. Mrs. Courtland slashes his wrist with a butcher knife, causing him to drop the pistol in her lap. Armed with the gun, she barricades herself in the study and fires the gun at him through the door. She attempts to call police from another room, but Bob leaves the entryway phone off the hook, preventing her from doing so.

Jennifer returns at nightfall to find a disheveled Mrs. Courtland, and dismisses her claim of being attacked. Bob appears at the front door, and a surprised Jennifer goes to greet him—he is her father. When she asks why he is there, he says he has arrived for her wedding, which she explains has been postponed. A shocked Mrs. Courtland claims Bob is the man who tried to attack her, but Bob assures Jennifer it was a mere misunderstanding, and that Mrs. Courtland wrongly assumed him an intruder. Jennifer offers her father dinner, during which he vaguely tells her he is "in trouble." Meanwhile, Mrs. Courtland phones the police from upstairs, but they dismiss her claim.

Jennifer becomes suspicious of her father when she notices that a kitchen window has been shattered, corroborating the story Mrs. Courtland told her. Bob lays out a series of photographs on the table of young women—each his victims—before revealing a forensic police sketch of him made by law enforcement. Revealing himself as the serial killer Michael is after, Bob pleads for Jennifer to help him evade authorities. He grows enraged when she attempts to call Michael, and violently drags Jennifer out of the house, but is stopped by Mrs. Courtland, who shoots him in the shoulder with a shotgun. Injured but still alive, Bob disables electricity to the house, and begins stalking Jennifer and Mrs. Courtland in the dark. Jennifer attempts to start the car in the garage, but finds it dismantled.

Upon returning inside, Jennifer finds her father with Mrs. Courtland, having overpowered her. While holding Jennifer at gunpoint, he is stabbed in the leg by Mrs. Courtland. Jennifer attempts to flee upstairs with Mrs. Courtland, pulling her up the staircase while fighting Bob off. Bogartis, a local officer summoned to the home by Michael, who received a panicked call from his mother, is hacked to death by Bob outside with an axe. Cornered in an upstairs room, Mrs. Courtland pleads with Jennifer to help her kill Bob, who forces his way in with an axe. As more police arrive, Bob begins strangling Mrs. Courtland, despite Jennifer threatening to shoot him. Just before he is able to kill Mrs. Courtland, police enter and fatally shoot Bob to death.

== Cast ==
- Taylor Gilbert as Jennifer
- William Witt as Bob
- Eve Brenner as Mrs. Courtland
- Warren Lincoln as Det. Michael Courtland
- Najean Cherry as Helen
- Stan Weston as Bogartis
- Lisa Ramirez as Diane
- Dan Kosloff as Barry

== Release ==
=== Critical response ===
Kevin Thomas of the Los Angeles Times praised the film as an "ingenious little suspense thriller that deftly upturns the cliches of the lady-in-distress genre," likening it to the Coen brothers's Blood Simple (1984). Malcolm Johnson of the Hartford Courant praised the film as a "gripping" thriller, adding that "as it moves toward its harrowing conclusion, Torment is by turns sad, scary, and darkly amusing."

The Philadelphia Daily News's Joe Baltake praised the film for its blunt and unfiltered presentation of violence against women, noting: "Borrowing freely from Wait Until Dark, Halloween and any number of Hitchcock thrillers, Torment takes its theme from what was merely implied—hinted at—in other slasher movies, i.e., that the women who get bludgeoned to death deserve it because of their brazen, sexually liberated ways." Carrie Rickey of The Philadelphia Inquirer praised the film, summarizing: "Tautly edited, crisply photographed, Torment takes the standard suspense scenario—waiting for fish in the barrel to be shot—only to reveal that the barrel contains flying fish... I could gripe that all the obvious intelligence it took to make this picture might be better applied to more humanistic endeavors. But then I also have to admit I haven't been so nerve-wracked since Halloween."

Bill Cosford of the Miami Herald was less laudatory of the film, deeming it a "cramped, low-budget thriller" boasting a "shabby" script.

=== Home media ===
Scorpion Releasing released the film on Blu-ray on July 21, 2020.
