= Bram Stoker's Legend of the Mummy =

1998 American horror film

- DVD cover
- Directed by: Jeffrey Obrow
- Written by: Lars Hauglie; Jeffrey Obrow (adaptation); John Penney (adaptation)
- Based on: The Jewel of Seven Stars by Bram Stoker
- Produced by: Bill Barnett; Robert E. Baruc; Ted Driscoll; Gina Fortunato; Hanel Goldstein; Jeffrey Obrow
- Starring: Louis Gossett Jr.; Amy Locane; Eric Lutes; Mark Lindsay Chapman; Lloyd Bochner
- Cinematography: Antonio Soriano
- Edited by: Gary Meyers
- Music by: Rick Cox
- Production company: Goldbar Entertainment
- Distributed by: New City Releasing
- Release dates: March 30, 1998 (Germany); December 29, 1998 (U.S.)
- Running time: 96 minutes
- Country: United States
- Language: English
- Budget: $1-3 million (estimate)

Bram Stoker's Legend of the Mummy, or simply Bram Stoker's The Mummy, is a 1998 American fantasy horror film based on Bram Stoker's 1903 novel The Jewel of Seven Stars. Directed by Jeffrey Obrow, who is one of the writers that adapted the novel for the film, it features an ensemble cast that includes Louis Gossett Jr., Eric Lutes, Amy Locane, Lloyd Bochner, Victoria Tennant, Mary Jo Catlett, Aubrey Morris, and Richard Karn. Morris previously appeared in Blood from the Mummy's Tomb, a 1971 Hammer Films adaptation of the same novel.

== Plot ==
The opening scene shows an Egyptian desert with the year as 1947 and the place as the Valley of the Sorcerer. A person takes a crimson jewel from a mummy's sarcophagus and then his face is blackened. The entrance into the tomb and the subsequent events are witnessed by a child.

The next scene takes place in San Francisco, Marin County, California. Abel Trelawny receives a package with half of a plaque in hieroglyphics. He puts the two pieces together and reads and translated the inscription: "we call upon thy powers to restore life." He refuses to participate and is struck down.

Art historian Robert Wyatt is summoned to the house of his old flame, Margaret Trelawny (Amy Locane). Her father, noted Egyptologist Abel Trelawny (Lloyd Bochner), was found in a coma in his study with claw marks on his wrist. Per his dictated wishes, Trelawny asks that he be kept in the room with his Egyptian artifacts with two witnesses at all times. Hoping to solve the mystery of Trelawny's case, Wyatt contacts John Corbeck (Louis Gossett, Jr.), an archaeologist who worked with Trelawny in the 1970s in uncovering the tomb of an Egyptian queen.

Trelawny's daughter, Margaret, along with former boyfriend and art historian, Robert Wyatt (Eric Lutes), then join forcces with Corbeck to work together to solve the mystery, along with Wyatt's colleague Brice Renard (Richard Karn). Brice is subsequently electrocuted in a telephone booth, a victim of the mummy's curse.

They discover that there is an ancient Egyptian curse. The trio of Margaret, Corbeck, and Wyatt discovers that Trelawny's coma is the result of a curse placed on him decades ago when he stole a rare jewel and disturbed the tomb of the ancient Egyptian Queen Tera.

The major theme of the movie emerges: Reincarnation. As members of the household mysteriously start turning up dead, Wyatt and the others realize the mummy of Queen Tera has arisen to claim their life-forces. The mummy is using these sacrifices in an attempt to resurrect and reincarnate the Queen. In the final scene, the Queen kills Corbeck.

As a postscript, Margaret, Wyatt, and Trelawny are shown as surviving. Margaret and Wyatt leave in a car. In the last scene of the film, we see the seven-finger bloody mark on Wyatt's left shoulder. One possible explanation is that Queen Tera was reincarnated as Margaret and lives on through her.

== Cast ==
- Louis Gossett Jr. as John Corbeck
- Amy Locane as Margaret Trelawny
  - Portia Doubleday as Young Margaret Trelawny
- Eric Lutes as Robert Wyatt
- Mark Lindsay Chapman as Daw
- Lloyd Bochner as Abel Trelawny
- Mary Jo Catlett as Mrs. Grant
- Aubrey Morris as Doctor Winchester
- Laura Otis as Lily
- Julian Stone as Jimmy
- Richard Karn as Brice Renard
- Rachel Naples as Queen Tera
- Donald Monet as Hutchins
- Kelly Perine as Keene
- Victoria Tennant as Mary

== Production ==
Jeffrey Obrow was inspired to adapt a classic horror novel to film after friend and colleague Matthew W. Mungle won the Academy Award for Best Makeup and Hairstyling for his work on Bram Stoker's Dracula. After some research, Obrow came across the novel The Jewel of Seven Stars by Bram Stoker and decided that the book would serve as the basis for his next film. John Penney wrote the initial adaptation, but due to scheduling conflicts Penney was unable to complete the script and Obrow finished it which would then be followed by a rewrite by Lars Hauglie.

Bram Stoker's The Mummy is the fourth film adaptation of the 1903 novel The Jewel of Seven Stars by Bram Stoker, following the 1970 television play The Curse of the Mummy (an installment of the TV series Mystery and Imagination), the 1971 Hammer Films production Blood from the Mummy's Tomb, and the 1980 film The Awakening. Obrow did not watch any of the prior adaptations as he did not want to let the prior works influence the direction of the film.

Obrow attempted to pitch the film in 1994 but was met with disinterest from producers. After failing to secure financing, Obrow instead created a 10-minute promotional video utilizing some aspiring effects artists who worked under his colleagues from The Kindred as well as USC Film School students Obrow had taught a class on independent film. Hanel Goldstein and Bill Barnett at Goldbar Entertainment were impressed by Obrow's video and came on board to produce the film. Goldstein and Barnett financed the film through foreign pre-sales as well as partnering with home video distributor A-PIX Home Video.

=== Special effects ===
Effects artists Chad Washam and Chris Fording provided the special effects makeup for the film, which included a mummy prop built using a sculpted head, rubber hands, and a spandex suit with cloth bandages glued to it; mechanical seven-fingered hands; shriveled face makeup; a baby mummy suit; and a foam latex chest appliance for a death scene. The effects crew also utilized heavy usage of dirt for the film.

== Release ==
The film was produced by Goldbar Entertainment and Unapix Entertainment Productions and was released direct-to-video on December 29, 1998 by A-Pix Entertainment on VHS and by Simitar Entertainment on DVD.

== Reception ==
TV Guide gave the film a score of two out of five stars and compared it unfavorably to Universal and Hammer horror films about the mummy. The review noted that "a dream sequence involving Robert is effective with the mummy tearing off Home Improvement star Richard Karn's fingers. The mummy itself is never completely seen." Critics were positive about Academy Award winner Louis Gossett, Jr.'s performance and the comedic relief offered by Richard Karn's character.

Alan Jones of the Radio Times also awarded the film two out of five stars, and wrote that it "features the least believable Mummy make-up in horror history". He described it as an uninspired adaptation with poor production quality and unconvincing makeup and criticized the overall execution.
