= Christopher Young =

American composer

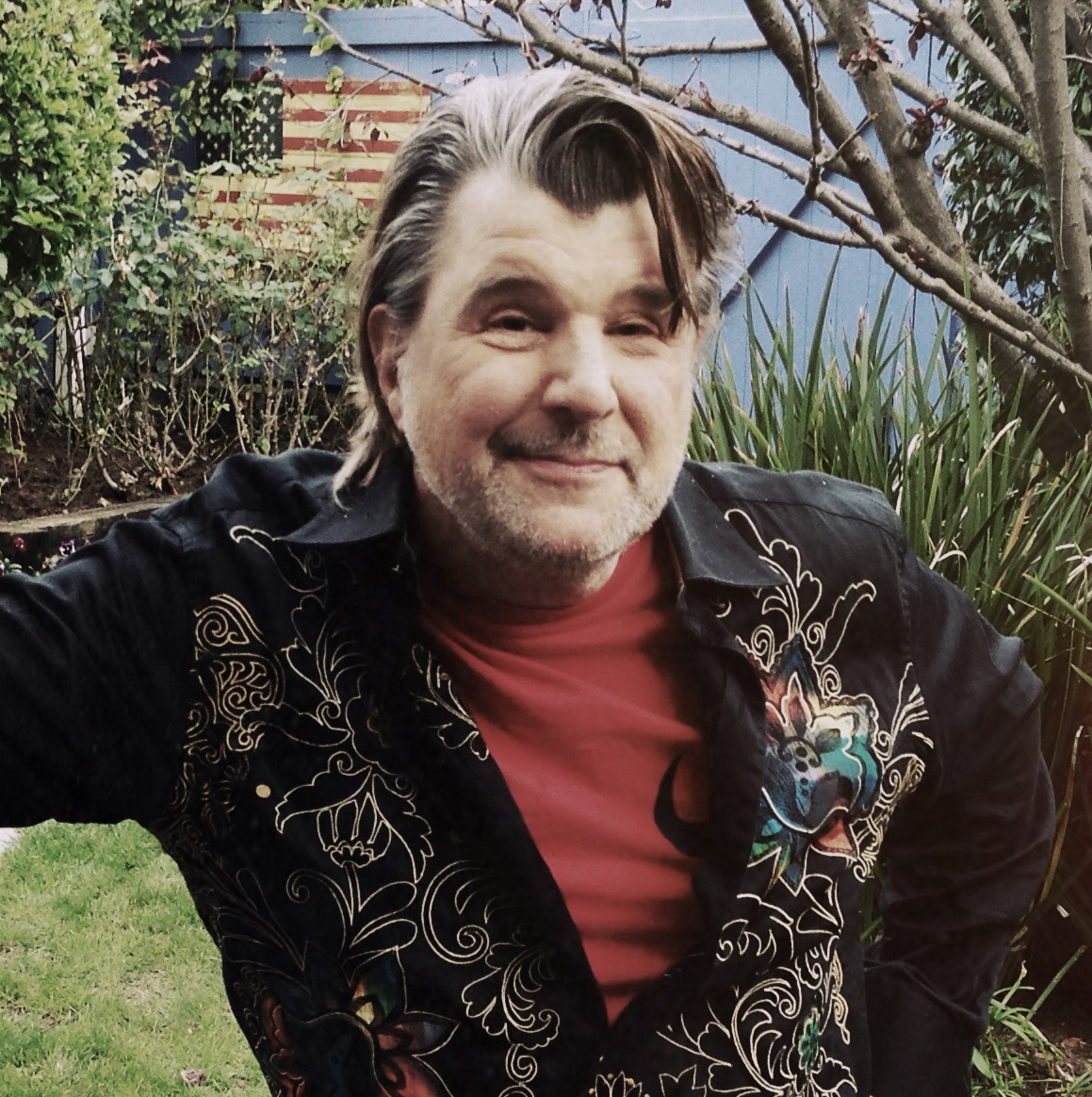
- Young in 2024

Background information
- Born: April 28, 1958 (age 68); Red Bank, New Jersey, U.S.
- Genre: Film score
- Occupations: Composer; orchestrator
- Instrument: Piano
- Years active: 1982–present
- Website: officialchristopheryoung.com

Christopher Young (born April 28, 1958) is an American composer of film and television scores.

Many of his compositions are for horror and thriller films, including Hellraiser, Species, Urban Legend, The Grudge, The Exorcism of Emily Rose, Drag Me to Hell, Sinister, Deliver Us from Evil and Pet Sematary. Other works include Rapid Fire, Copycat, Set It Off, Entrapment, The Hurricane, Swordfish, Ghost Rider, Spider-Man 3, and The Shipping News, for which he was nominated for a Golden Globe Award for Best Original Score.

Young was honored with the Richard H. Kirk award at the 2008 BMI Film and TV Awards. The award is given annually to a composer who has made significant contributions to film and television music.

== Early life and education ==
Young was born in Red Bank, New Jersey. He graduated from Hampshire College in Massachusetts with a Bachelor of Arts in music, and then completed his post-graduate work at the University of North Texas.

== Career ==
In 1980, he moved to Los Angeles. Originally a jazz drummer, when he heard some of Bernard Herrmann's works he decided to become a film composer. He studied at the UCLA Film School under David Raksin. He teaches at the Thornton School of Music of the University of Southern California.

== Works as composer ==
=== Film ===
==== 1980s ====
Year	Title	Director	Notes
1981	The Minstrel’s Song	Chris Hopkins	Short film
1982	The Dorm That Dripped Blood	Stephen Carpenter; Jeffrey Obrow	—N/a
1982	Highpoint	Peter Carter	New score for the new cut of the film that was extensively reshoot and released in 1984. The original cut of the film before reshoots, was composed by John Addison.
1983	Robby	Ralph C. Bluemke	Replacement score – Music for the 1983 VHS release (original release: 1968)
1984	The Power	Stephen Carpenter; Jeffrey Obrow	—N/a
1984	The Oasis	Sparky Greene	—N/a
1985	Avenging Angel	Robert Vincent O'Neil	—N/a
1985	Def-Con 4	Paul Donovan	Replacement score
1985	Barbarian Queen	Héctor Olivera	Tracked music – Credit shared with James Horner
1985	Wizards of the Lost Kingdom	Héctor Olivera	Tracked music – Credit shared with James Horner
1985	Godzilla 1985	R.J. Kizer; Koji Hashimoto	Tracked music (US release); part of Young's score from Def-Con 4 appears in several scenes, including Godzilla's attack on the Soviet submarine, the scene where the SDF armored division arrives in Tokyo Bay, and Okumura's near-death experience during the helicopter extraction in Tokyo.
1985	Wheels of Fire	Cirio H. Santiago	—N/a
1985	A Nightmare on Elm Street 2: Freddy's Revenge	Jack Sholder	—N/a
1986	Getting Even	Dwight H. Little	—N/a
1986	Torment	Samson Aslanian; John Hopkins	—N/a
1986	Invaders from Mars	Tobe Hooper	—N/a
1986	Trick or Treat	Charles Martin Smith	—N/a
1987	Hellraiser	Clive Barker	—N/a
1987	Deathstalker II: Duel of the Titans	Jim Wynorski	Additional music – Tracked music
1987	Flowers in the Attic	Jeffrey Bloom	—N/a
1987	U-Boats: The Wolfpack	Patrick Griffin; Richard Jones	Short films – “Rommel” / “Secret Weapons of WW2” / “U Boats: The Wolf Pack” / “B17 The Flying Fortress” / “Luftwaffe – The Air Weapon” – Tracked music
1988	The Telephone	Rip Torn	—N/a
1988	Bat*21	Peter Markle	—N/a
1988	Haunted Summer	Ivan Passer	—N/a
1988	Hellbound: Hellraiser II	Tony Randel	—N/a
1989	The Fly II	Chris Walas	—N/a
1989	Hider in the House	Matthew Patrick	—N/a

==== 1990s ====
Year	Title	Director	Notes
1990	Barbarian Queen II: The Empress Strikes Back	Joe Finley	Tracked music – Direct-to-video
1990	The Exorcist III	William Peter Blatty	Incomplete unused replacement score
1990	Bright Angel	Michael Fields	—N/a
1991	The Five Heartbeats	Robert Townsend	Additional music
1992	The Vagrant	Chris Walas	—N/a
1992	Jersey Girl	David Burton Morris	Unused
1992	Rapid Fire	Dwight H. Little	—N/a
1992	Jennifer 8	Bruce Robinson	Replacement score
1993	The Dark Half	George A. Romero	—N/a
1993	Sliver	Phillip Noyce	Additional music
1993	Dream Lover	Nicholas Kazan	—N/a
1994	Squanto: A Warrior’s Tale	Xavier Koller	Incomplete unused score
1995	Murder in the First	Marc Rocco	—N/a
1995	Tales from the Hood	Rusty Cundieff	—N/a
1995	Species	Roger Donaldson	—N/a
1995	Virtuosity	Brett Leonard	—N/a
1995	Copycat	Jon Amiel	—N/a
1996	Unforgettable	John Dahl	—N/a
1996	Set It Off	F. Gary Gray	—N/a
1996	Head Above Water	Jim Wilson	—N/a
1997	Murder at 1600	Dwight H. Little	—N/a
1997	The Man Who Knew Too Little	Jon Amiel	—N/a
1998	Hard Rain	Mikael Salomon	—N/a
1998	Hush	Jonathan Darby	—N/a
1998	Rounders	John Dahl	—N/a
1998	Judas Kiss	Sebastian Gutierrez	—N/a
1998	Urban Legend	Jamie Blanks	—N/a
1998	Playing by Heart	Willard Carroll	Additional music
1999	Entrapment	Jon Amiel	—N/a
1999	In Too Deep	Michael Rymer	—N/a
1999	The Big Kahuna	John Swanbeck	—N/a
1999	The Hurricane	Norman Jewison	—N/a

==== 2000s ====
Year	Title	Director	Notes
2000	Wonder Boys	Curtis Hanson	—N/a
2000	Bless the Child	Chuck Russell	—N/a
2000	The Gift	Sam Raimi	—N/a
2001	Madison	William Bindley	Themes only – Score by Kevin Kiner
2001	Sweet November	Pat O'Connor	Replacement score
2001	Swordfish	Dominic Sena	—N/a
2001	Scenes of the Crime	Dominique Forma	—N/a
2001	The Glass House	Daniel Sackheim	—N/a
2001	Bandits	Barry Levinson	—N/a
2001	The Shipping News	Lasse Hallström	—N/a
2002	Dragonfly	Tom Shadyac	Incomplete unused score
2002	The Country Bears	Peter Hastings	—N/a
2002	The Tower	E. Gedney Webb; Jim Elliott	Short film
2003	The Core	Jon Amiel	—N/a
2003	Shade	Damian Nieman	European release only
2003	Runaway Jury	Gary Fleder	—N/a
2003	Something’s Gotta Give	Nancy Meyers	Additional music
2004	Spider-Man 2	Sam Raimi	Additional music
2004	The Grudge	Takashi Shimizu	—N/a
2005	Hide and Seek	John Polson	Incomplete unused score
2005	Beauty Shop	Bille Woodruff	—N/a
2005	Miss Congeniality 2: Armed and Fabulous	John Pasquin	Additional music – Tracked music
2005	The Exorcism of Emily Rose	Scott Derrickson	—N/a
2005	An Unfinished Life	Lasse Hallström	Unused
2006	Ask the Dust	Robert Towne	Incomplete unused score
2006	The Grudge 2	Takashi Shimizu	—N/a
2006	Dark Ride	Craig Singer	Themes only – Score by Kostas Christides
2007	Ghost Rider	Mark Steven Johnson	—N/a
2007	Spider-Man 3	Sam Raimi	Also appears in a cameo role (“Music director”); Themes by Danny Elfman
2007	Lucky You	Curtis Hanson	—N/a
2007	Shortcut to Happiness	Alec Baldwin (credited as "Harry Kirkpatrick")	Co-composed with Ramin Djawadi
2008	Untraceable	Gregory Hoblit	—N/a
2008	Sleepwalking	William Maher	Replacement score
2008	The Informers	Gregor Jordan	Replacement score
2009	The Uninvited	The Guard Brothers	—N/a
2009	Drag Me to Hell	Sam Raimi	Also appears in a cameo role (“Pedestrian with cupcake”)
2009	Creation	Jon Amiel	—N/a
2009	Love Happens	Brandon Camp	—N/a

==== 2010s ====
Year	Title	Director	Notes
2010	When in Rome	Mark Steven Johnson	—N/a
2010	Gone with the Pope	Duke Mitchell	Additional music
2010	The Black Tulip	Sonia Nassery Cole	—N/a
2011	Priest	Scott Stewart	—N/a
2011	The Rum Diary	Bruce Robinson	—N/a
2011	Faces in the Crowd	Julien Magnat	Themes only – Score by John McCarthy
2012	Sinister	Scott Derrickson	—N/a
2012	The Tall Man	Pascal Laugier	Themes only – Score by Todd Bryanton
2012	Box of Shadows	Mauro Borrelli	Themes only – Score by José J. Herring
2012	The Baytown Outlaws	Barry Battles	—N/a
2012	Scary or Die	Bob Badway	Segment "Re-Membered"
2013	Saving Norman	Hanneke Schutte	Short film produced by Kevin Spacey
2013	The Smile Man	Anton Lanshakov	Short film produced by Kevin Spacey
2013	Love’s Routine	Shirlyn Wong	Short film produced by Kevin Spacey
2013	Killing Season	Mark Steven Johnson	—N/a
2013	Gods Behaving Badly	Marc Turtletaub	Unreleased film
2013	A Madea Christmas	Tyler Perry	—N/a
2014	The Monkey King	Cheang Pou-soi	—N/a
2014	The Single Moms Club	Tyler Perry	—N/a
2014	Deliver Us from Evil	Scott Derrickson	—N/a
2016	The Monkey King 2	Cheang Pou-soi	—N/a
2018	One by One	Jeffrey Obrow	—N/a
2018	Tales from the Hood 2	Rusty Cundieff; Darin Scott	Themes only – Score by Frederik Wiedmann
2019	Pet Sematary	Kevin Kölsch; Dennis Widmyer	—N/a
2019	Fanboy	Gillian Greene	Short film

==== 2020s ====
Year	Title	Director	Notes
2020	The Empty Man	David Prior	—N/a
2022	The Offering	Oliver Park	—N/a
2023	Nosferatu: A Symphony of Horror	Friedrich Wilhelm Murnau	New score (original release: 1922)
2023	The Piper	Erlingur Thoroddsen	—N/a
2023	Pursued	Jeffrey Obrow	Themes only – Score by Max Blomgren and Jung J Lee
2023	Bentobox	Olivia Owyeung	Short film – Themes only – Score by Matthew Rosales
2026	Passenger	André Øvredal	—N/a

=== Television ===
Year	Title	Director	Notes
1986	The Twilight Zone	Sheldon Larry; Claudia Weill	S1 E15 (“A Small Talent for War” / “A Matter of Minutes”)
1987	American Harvest	Dick Lowry	TV film
1987	Vietnam War Story	Georg Stanford Brown; David Burton Morris	TV series – Unknown episodes; probably S1 E1 (“The Mine”) and S1 E5 (“R & R”)
1989	Vietnam War Story: The Last Days	Luis Soto; David Burton Morris	TV film – Segments: “The Last Outpost” / “Dirty Work”
1990	Max and Helen	Philip Saville	TV film
1990	Last Flight Out	Larry Elikann	TV film
1994	Judicial Consent	William Bindley	TV film
1996	Norma Jean & Marilyn	Tim Fywell	TV film
2001	The Warden	Stephen Gyllenhaal	TV film
2004	Something the Lord Made	Joseph Sargent	TV film
2014	Dominion	Scott Stewart	TV series – S1 E0 (“Pilot”)
2020	50 States of Fright	Sam Raimi	TV series – S1 E1-2-3 (“The Golden Arm: Michigan”) + Series theme
2022	Guillermo del Toro's Cabinet of Curiosities	David Prior	TV series – S1 E3 (“The Autopsy”)
2022	Echo 3	Mark Boal; Pablo Trapero; Claudia Llosa; Jeffrey Nachmanoff	TV series – 10 episodes – Replacement score

=== Video games ===
Year	Title	Director	Notes
2009	The Saboteur	Trey Watkins	Themes only – Score by Gabriel Mann and Rebecca Kneubuhl
2017	Wilson's Heart	Josh Bear	—N/a
2025	Deadpool VR	Daniel Bullock	—N/a

=== Other work ===
Year	Title	Director	Notes
1984	The Philadelphia Experiment	Stewart Raffill	Trailer music
2011	A Symphony of Hope: The Haiti Project	Brian Weidling	Collaborative composition in aid of the charity “Hands Together” after the Haiti earthquake in 2010. A documentary directed by Brian Weidling, which captured the recording session, was released in 2017.
2011	Susan Graham: A Documentary	—N/a	Music for a documentary commemorating the retirement of Susan Graham, president of the Connecticut prep school “The Gunnery”
2016	Chevrolet TV-Spot	Sam Raimi	Commercial
2018	The Lost Children of Planet X	—N/a	Concept album developed from unused cues originally composed for the film Lucky You
2018	Three Bernard Herrmann “Melodramas”	—N/a	Narration of three poems – “Cynara” by Ernest Dowson, “Annabel Lee” by Edgar Allan Poe, and “The City of Brass” – scored by Bernard Herrmann and performed by the Hollywood Studio Orchestra, conducted by Michael McGehee
2022	Scream Warriors	—N/a	Interludes and arrangements for the Halloween rock record by LVCRFT
