= The Power (1984 film) =

- Theatrical poster
- Directed by: Stephen Carpenter; Jeffrey Obrow
- Screenplay by: Stephen Carpenter; Jeffrey Obrow
- Story by: Stephen Carpenter; Jeffrey Obrow; John Penney; John Hopkins
- Produced by: Jeffrey Obrow
- Starring: Suzy Stokey; Warren Lincoln; Lisa Erickson; Chad Christian; Ben Gilbert
- Cinematography: Stephen Carpenter
- Edited by: Stephen Carpenter; Jeffrey Obrow
- Music by: Christopher Young
- Production company: Jeff Obrow Productions
- Distributed by: Film Ventures International; Artists Releasing Corporation
- Release date: January 20, 1984
- Running time: 90 minutes
- Country: United States
- Language: English
- Box office: $929,162

The Power is a 1984 American supernatural horror film directed by Stephen Carpenter and Jeffrey Obrow. It stars Suzy Stokey, Warren Lincoln, Lisa Erickson, Chad Christian, Ben Gilbert and Chris Morrill. The plot tells about an evil spirit trapped inside an ancient Aztec doll, which possesses a young man after he takes it.

== Plot ==
An Aztec demon named Destacatyl, believed to have the power to control human souls, is trapped within a small Aztec doll. However, when a young man named Jerry comes into possession of the idol, he is soon possessed by the demon and begins wreaking havoc on everyone he encounters—including a group of high school students.

== Cast ==
- Suzy Stokey as Sandy McKennah (as Susan Stokey)
- Warren Lincoln as Jerry
- Lisa Erickson as Julie
- Chad Christian as Tommy
- Ben Gilbert as Matt
- J. Dinan Myrtetus as Francis Lott
- Stan Weston as Professor Matthew Wilson
- Chris Morrill as Ron Prince
- Rod Mays as Lee McKennah
- Alice Champlin as Roxanne
- Juan Del Valle as Jeep driver
- Gabe Cohen as Marty
- Jackie Cowgill as Mrs. Lawrence
- James Gilchrist as Bill Hopkins
- Brian Grayson as Mark
- Ted Novak as Rick
- Jay Fisher as Raphael
- Costy Basile as Jorge
- Milton Robinson as Jack
- Steve Nagle as Driver
- Barbara Murray as Tommy's mother
- Richard Cowgill as Cemetery guard
- Jake Jones as Janitor

== Release ==
The Power had a limited theatrical release through Artists Releasing Corporation on January 20, 1984, and was released on VHS by Vestron Video the same year. It was released on DVD by Scorpion Releasing on January 7, 2017.
