= Yorlin Madera =

Dominican-born American television actor

- Born: May 5, 1975 (age 51); Dominican Republic
- Occupation: Television actor

Yorlin Madera (born May 5, 1975) is a Dominican-born American television actor. He is best known for playing Cristian Vega in the American soap opera television series One Life to Live from 1995 to 1998.

== Life and career ==
Madera was born in the Dominican Republic. At the age of three, his father left and emigrated to the United States, and at the age of eight, his mother and his younger brother also emigrated. After his family emigrated, he lived with his mother's best friend. In 1983, he emigrated to the United States, reuniting with his family. He attended and graduated from the Fiorello H. LaGuardia High School. After graduating, he attended New York University, but dropped out.

Madera played Cristian Vega in the ABC soap opera television series One Life to Live from 1995 to 1998. In addition to his role in One Life to Live, in 1997, he was awarded the Nancy Susan Reynolds Award, and he guest-starred in television programs including Boston Public and NCIS. In 2006, he appeared in his first and only film Zyzzyx Road, starring Katherine Heigl, Leo Grillo and Tom Sizemore.
