= The Kindred (1987 film) =

- Theatrical release poster
- Directed by: Jeffrey Obrow; Stephen Carpenter
- Screenplay by: Stephen Carpenter; Jeffrey Obrow; John Penney; Earl Ghaffari; Joseph Stefano
- Produced by: Jeffrey Obrow
- Starring: David Allen Brooks; Amanda Pays; Talia Balsam; Kim Hunter; Rod Steiger
- Cinematography: Stephen Carpenter
- Edited by: Earl Ghaffari; John Penney
- Music by: David Newman
- Production company: Kindred Limited Partnership
- Distributed by: F/M Entertainment
- Release date: January 9, 1987
- Running time: 92 minutes
- Country: United States
- Language: English
- Budget: $2.5 million
- Box office: $2.4 million

The Kindred is a 1987 American science fiction horror film directed by Jeffrey Obrow and Stephen Carpenter. Obrow also produced the film, and co-wrote it along with Carpenter, Earl Ghaffari and John Penney. Starring David Allen Brooks, Amanda Pays and Rod Steiger, The Kindred was released on January 9, 1987, and grossed just over $2 million.

== Plot ==
Amanda's deathbed request to her son, John, was for him to destroy all the lab notes from her last experiment. She also blurts out he had a brother. At the funeral, John meets Melissa, who claims to be his mother's biggest fan. Together with some of John's friends, they go to Amanda's house, but none are prepared for what they find there: his monstrous, tentacled baby brother. Now he has to get to his mother's greatest advancement in Human Evolution before a mad scientist gets to him first.

== Cast ==
- David Allen Brooks as John Hollins
- Rod Steiger as Dr. Phillip Lloyd
- Amanda Pays as Melissa Leftridge
- Talia Balsam as Sharon Raymond
- Kim Hunter as Amanda Hollins
- Timothy Gibbs as Hart Phillips
- Peter Frechette as Brad Baxter
- Julia Montgomery as Cindy Russell
- Bunky Jones as Nell Valentine (as Bunki Z)
- Charles Grueber as Harry
- Bennet Guillory as Dr. Stone
- Edgar Small as Dr. Larson
- Jim Boeke as Jackson (as James Boeke)
- Randy Harrington as Paramedic
- Benjamin J. Perry as Porsche Driver (as Ben Perry)

== Production ==
In order to obtain the needed financing for The Kindred, Jeffrey Obrow and Stephen Carpenter (who along with their producer Stacey Giachino had worked together since their days at UCLA) looked through their script for the most exciting seven minutes worth of moments and used them to film a trailer to show to potential investors. The production was picked up F/M Entertainment. Along with directors Obrow and Carpenter, the film's editors Earl Ghaffari and John Penney also provided input in the writing with Joseph Stefano hired by F/M Entertainment following the acquisition. The monster "Anthony" was designed by Michael McCracken Sr., who had previously made the gremlin for the fourth segment in Twilight Zone: The Movie.

Principal photography began and wrapped in California, United States.

== Release ==
The film began its theatrical release on January 9, 1987.

After over a decade of work and legal tangles, Synapse Films announced in September 2017 that they would release the film for the first time since its VHS run. It was released on Blu-ray and DVD in a limited SteelBook edition of 3,500 units on December 14, 2021, from a new 4K resolution scan.

== Reception ==
On the review aggregator website Rotten Tomatoes, 44% of nine critics' reviews are positive, with an average rating of 5.3/10.

Caryn James of The New York Times called the film "a disjointed, jigsaw-puzzle movie that is constantly announcing its borrowed characters and subplots and special effects." TV Guide awarded The Kindred one out of five stars, criticizing the film's plot as "overly complicated and unengaging" and its special effects as uneven.

Brian J. Dillard of AllMovie stated that The Kindred "remains watchable in spite of its weaknesses," commending the film's visual effects, music, and Gothic trappings. However, Dilliard criticized the film's numerous plot holes.
