= Past Perfect (1996 film) =

- Film Poster
- Directed by: Jonathan Heap
- Written by: John Penney
- Produced by: James Shavick
- Starring: Eric Roberts; Laurie Holden; Nick Mancuso; Saul Rubinek; Marcie Mellish
- Cinematography: John Houtman
- Edited by: Neil Grieve
- Music by: Christophe Beck
- Production companies: James Shavick Entertainment; James Shavick Film Company; Past Perfect Productions Ltd.
- Distributed by: Live Home Video; Nu Image; Past Perfect Productions Ltd.
- Release date: October 11, 1996; (USA)
- Running time: 92 min.
- Countries: United States; Canada
- Language: English

Past Perfect is a 1996 direct-to-video action-science fiction film, starring Eric Roberts and Nick Mancuso. It was written by John Penney and directed by Jonathan Heap.

== Plot ==
A cop and his partner have to save a young gang member from certain death, as a team of killers from the future are set on a mission to kill the members before their future crimes while they're still mere delinquents.

== Cast ==
- Eric Roberts as Dylan Cooper
- Laurie Holden as Ally Marsey
- Nick Mancuso as Stone
- Saul Rubinek as Bookkeeper
- Marcie Mellish as Zoe

== Reception ==
Richard Scheib from "Moria.co" gave "Past Perfect" two stars and stated: "There is little to Past Perfect beyond being a routine B-budget sf/action film that has been largely predicated on serving up an action sequence at regular intervals every few minutes. These are unexceptional, although there is a decent car chase sequence through a maze of shipping containers that comes with the nifty concept of the drivers having to dodge illusory objects placed in their way and not being sure whether things blocking their path are real or not. Website "Explosive Action" wrote: "Overall, I enjoyed this quite a lot. The action was fast-paced and pretty continuous, with rarely any dull moments to slow the pace down. The three characters from the future-world were great fun and it was good just to see Ribinek in something else. Roberts was solid looked to be having a good time with the character, even managing a quip ("You have the right to remain silent - forever!"). Laurie Holden works well with Roberts on screen though her character isn't anything special. The science was baloney, but inventive, and the explosions were plentiful and of a decent size. Recommended." Nathan Rabin from The A.V. Club wrote: "While Past Perfect starts off gleefully amoral, it loses nerve about halfway through, transforming Roberts' character from a barely controlled vigilante cop to a warm, paternalistic protector concerned with giving troubled teenagers a chance at redemption. Still, Past Perfect is not without its strengths, particularly Roberts' lead performance and a couple of entertainingly slimy supporting turns by direct-to-video staples Nick Mancuso and Saul Rubinek."
