= Zzyzx (film) =

2006 American thriller film

- Promotional poster
- Directed by: Richard Halpern
- Written by: Art D'Alessandro
- Produced by: Richard Halpern
- Starring: Kenny Johnson; Robyn Cohen; Ryan Fox; Kayo Zepeda
- Music by: Kays Al-Atrakchi
- Production company: Yarble.com
- Release date: February 4, 2006
- Running time: 80 minutes
- Country: United States
- Language: English
- Budget: $1,000,000 (estimated)

Zzyzx is a 2006 thriller film produced and directed by Richard Halpern and starring Kenny Johnson, Robyn Cohen, Ryan Fox, and Kayo Zepeda. It is set in the Mojave Desert and Las Vegas. The film was written by Artholomew D'Alessandro. The film is also known as Burned.

== Plot ==
Two men are driving to Las Vegas for the weekend when Lou, who is driving, asks his friend Ryan if one could get away with killing someone in the middle of nowhere. As they explore Zzyzx Road, Lou teases Ryan by almost hitting a pedestrian. As Ryan complains about Lou's behavior, Lou doubles back and sets a crash course for the man that they saw on the road. Ryan grabs the wheel in the hopes to stop Lou from hitting the man, but in the end, they lose control of the car and hit the man. The man dies, only after whispering the words "Go home" into Lou's ear. Lou takes his identification and puts on his watch.

Lou and Ryan contemplate what to do next, now that the man has died. As a woman walks up the road towards their car, they grab the body and throw it into the back seat of the car. They talk to the woman, named Candice, to find that she is married to the man they killed. She invites them into her husband's Winnebago, and they drink a few beers.

After they converse for a while, Lou and Ryan reveal more about themselves. Lou used to be in the Army, after going to Iraq and coming back, Ryan said he was never the same. Lou consistently derides Ryan and calls him Mitch because it rhymes with "bitch". Ryan is found to be a very introverted person. Lou and Ryan keep an eye on Candice to make sure that she does not find out they killed her husband.

They eventually get drunk, and they all take narcotics. Eventually, Candice and Lou end up making out, while Ryan tries to pull Candice off of Lou. Lou storms out of the trailer after this as he knows that Candice knows what happened. He throws the keys to the Winnebago into the desert. Candice finds the key to the car that Ryan and Lou drove into the desert, and she tries to steal the car. Much to her dismay, the car does not start. Lou tries to coax her out of the car, but he ends up getting stabbed in his cheek by Candice.

Ryan, thinking that Lou is to blame for the murder, helps Candice start the car. After Ryan fixes the car, Candice drives off while Ryan is still on the hood of the car, instead of driving off with him. Ryan, in retaliation, disables the car by ripping out some wires.

In the end, Ryan beats Lou to death with a golf club. He then proceeds to free Candice, and she offers to have sex with him in exchange. Afterward, Candice gouges out Ryan's eyes, and sets him on fire. She finds her husband's body and cuts his leg off, revealing that he had $100,000 hidden in a prosthetic leg. Candice walks off into the distance with the leg, after betraying all those around her.

== Cast ==
- Robyn Cohen as Candice
- Kenny Johnson as Lou
- Ryan Fox as Ryan
- Kayo Zepeda as Manny
- Richard Halpern as Blackjack Dealer

== Reception ==
Ryan Brown of The Sun Chronicle wrote "While Zzyzx may not be the best thing ever produced or even the most original, it does strive for an experience that is new: tight camera work in the confined space of a recreational vehicle, film hues saturated with reds and greens, and garbled sounds blasted from the speakers to show the effects of a drug trip". Debi Moore of Dread Central commented "Zzyzx is a true rarity in today's indie scene. There are no zombies (either the fast or the slow variety), no moping vampires, and no gratuitous torture of gorgeous tied-up women. Instead we are treated to a rich character and dialogue driven story where no one is quite what they seem to be and the audience is kept guessing as to what's really going on right up to the final moments of the film. And it contains one of the most kick-ass opening credit sequences you're likely to see anywhere. All of this — and more — from a film with an approximate $1 million budget and an only nine-day shooting schedule!"

== See also ==
- Zyzzyx Road – 2006 American thriller film by John Penney
