= Grimm (TV series) =

American fantasy television series, 2011–2017

- Genre: Occult detective fiction; Police procedural; Horror; Supernatural; Urban fantasy
- Created by: Stephen Carpenter; Jim Kouf; David Greenwalt
- Based on: Grimm's Fairy Tales, by the Brothers Grimm
- Starring: David Giuntoli; Russell Hornsby; Bitsie Tulloch; Jacqueline Toboni; Silas Weir Mitchell; Sasha Roiz; Reggie Lee; Bree Turner; Claire Coffee
- Composer: Richard Marvin
- Country of origin: United States
- Original language: English
- No. of seasons: 6
- No. of episodes: 123 (list of episodes)

Production
- Executive producers: Norberto Barba; Jim Kouf; David Greenwalt; Sean Hayes; Todd Milliner
- Producers: Steve Oster; Lynn Kouf; Julie Herlocker; Bruce Carter; Thomas Ian Griffith
- Production locations: Portland, Oregon and the surrounding metropolitan area
- Cinematography: Clark Mathis; Eliot Rockett; Ross Berryman
- Editors: Chris G. Willingham; George Pilkinton
- Camera setup: Single-camera
- Running time: 43 minutes
- Production companies: GK Productions; Hazy Mills Productions; Open 4 Business Productions; Universal Television

Original release
- Network: NBC
- Release: October 28, 2011 – March 31, 2017

Grimm is an American urban fantasy police procedural drama horror television series created by Stephen Carpenter, Jim Kouf and David Greenwalt, and produced by Universal Television for NBC. The series premiered on October 28, 2011 in the United States, and ended on March 31, 2017, after six seasons consisting of 123 episodes. The series' narrative follows Portland homicide detective Nicholas Burkhardt (played by David Giuntoli), who discovers he is a Grimm, the latest in a line of guardians who is sworn to keep the balance between humanity and mythological creatures, known as Wesen. The series features a supporting cast with Russell Hornsby, Bitsie Tulloch, Silas Weir Mitchell, Sasha Roiz, Reggie Lee, Bree Turner, and Claire Coffee.

Grimm was originally developed for CBS, but did not end up moving forward due to the 2007–08 writers' strike. In January 2011, the series moved to NBC. It has been described as "a cop drama—with a twist ... a dark and fantastical project about a world in which characters inspired by Grimms' Fairy Tales exist", though the stories and characters inspiring the show are also drawn from other sources. The series initially garnered mixed reviews from critics, though reception grew more favorable throughout the series' run. The sixth and final season, which consists of 13 episodes, premiered on January 6, 2017, and concluded on March 31, 2017.

== Synopsis ==
Homicide Detective Nick Burkhardt of the Portland Police Department learns he descended from a line of guardians known as Grimms, charged with keeping balance between humanity and the Wesen, or mythological creatures of the world (Wesen is the German word for being or creature). Throughout the series, he must battle against an assortment of dangerous creatures with help from his Wesen friend, Monroe, and his partner, Detective Hank Griffin.

Beginning with Season 5, Black Claw and Hadrian's Wall (HW) are two opposing groups repeatedly mentioned in the series where many characters belong to these creature (wesen) groups.

Opening: "There once was a man who lived a life so strange, it had to be true. Only he could see what no one else can—the darkness inside, the real monster within, and he's the one who must stop them. This is his calling. This is his duty. This is the life of a Grimm."

== Cast and characters ==
=== Main ===
- David Giuntoli as Detective Nicholas "Nick" Burkhardt, the eponymous Grimm, descended from a line of hunters that dated back to the crusades, who fight supernatural forces. He temporarily loses his Grimm power after the events of the season 3 finale, but regains them in the season 4 episode "Highway of Tears".
- Russell Hornsby as Detective Hank Griffin, Nick's Homicide partner, who initially is not aware that Nick is a Grimm. After learning the truth in Season 2 Episode 3, Bad Moon Rising, he assists Nick in hunting rogue Wesen.
- Bitsie Tulloch as Nick's girlfriend Juliette Silverton (seasons 1 to 4), a veterinarian, and as Eve (seasons 5 and 6).
  - Juliette is initially unaware of Nick's duties as a Grimm. He tells her in the finale of season 1, but by season 2, a magically induced amnesia has removed Nick from her memory altogether. She eventually regains her memories and learns the truth of Nick's abilities. In season 4, a series of events and dangerous spells results in Juliette becoming an exceptionally powerful Hexenbiest. Her plans for revenge culminate in the death of Nick's mother, and in the season 4 finale she is shot by Trubel with a crossbow bolt as she is about to kill Nick.
  - Eve is a mysterious woman who has all of Juliette's memories and powers but none of her emotional attachments. In season 6, her powers are temporarily suppressed and her ability to feel emotions begins to return after Nick heals her with the stick.
- Silas Weir Mitchell as Monroe, a wolflike Wesen called a Blutbad, who is Nick's direct source of insight and information into the supernatural community. He speaks fluent German and also helps Nick make contact with creatures that would normally avoid dealing with a Grimm. Eventually, he falls in love with and marries Rosalee, a Fuchsbau, despite opposition to their mixed marriage from a Wesen purity cult. They eventually have triplets together.
- Sasha Roiz as Captain Sean Renard, Nick's adept and efficient superior. Renard is half Zauberbiest, a warlocklike-Wesen and is of royal lineage. His mother, Elizabeth (Louise Lombard), is a Hexenbiest and was mistress to his father, the king of Austria. He is also the father of Hexenbiest Adalind Schade's daughter, Diana. In season 5, he joins the pro-Wesen organization Black Claw, which seeks to put Wesen in positions of power over humans, and is elected mayor. In season 6, he resigns and returns to being Police captain.
- Reggie Lee as police Sergeant Drew Wu, who works with Nick and Hank, and tends to do "grunt work" for them, running down facts and information. Nick is eventually forced to tell him about the Wesen world after his involvement in numerous Wesen murder cases. In season 5, he is infected with Lycanthropia, gaining the ability to transform ("woge") into a Neanderthal-like version of a Blutbad.
- Bree Turner as Rosalee Calvert (recurring season 1; regular seasons 2 to 6), a foxlike Fuchsbau who takes over her brother's Wesen spice shop after he is murdered. She assists Nick and Monroe by providing information and preparing remedies for supernatural problems. She and Monroe marry in the season 3 finale and she reveals she is pregnant with triplets in the season 5 finale.
- Claire Coffee as Adalind Schade (recurring seasons 1 and 2 (part); regular seasons 2 (part) to 6), a witch-like Wesen called a Hexenbiest, who works for Sean Renard. She loses her powers after ingesting Nick's blood. Seeking revenge, she poisons Juliette and colludes with Renard's half-brother, Eric, sleeping with both of them trying to conceive a royal baby. Eventually, she regains her powers through agonizing rituals while pregnant. With Sean she has a daughter, Diana Schade-Renard, who has unique powers. Later, she gives birth to a second child, a boy she names Kelly (after Kelly Burkhardt, Nick's mother). The boy's father is revealed to be Nick, with whom she had sex during a complex ritual to take his powers that involved her disguising herself as Juliette. After Juliette is transformed into Eve, Adalind moves in with Nick to care for Kelly. She and Nick eventually start a relationship. They eventually profess their love for each other during the fight against Zerstörer. The two of them get married at some point and have a happy family.

=== Recurring ===
- Danny Bruno as Bud Wurstner, a beaver-like Wesen known as an Eisbiber who works as a handyman in the Portland area. Bud first learned of Nick's status as a Grimm after nervously woging while fixing his and Juliette's fridge. Bud and Nick later became friends when Nick promised not to do what any other Grimm would have done, cutting off the Wesen's head. Bud repeatedly turns to Nick when tensions rise within the Wesen community and the two often help each other throughout the series.
- Jacqueline Toboni as Theresa Rubel "Trubel", an orphaned Grimm who travels through the United States before eventually ending up in Portland. Trubel is introduced in the season 3 episode "Nobody Knows the Trubel I've Seen" when she becomes the prime suspect in a homicide and she meets Nick who tells her what a Grimm is and agrees to take her in as his protégée. Trubel later joins Hadrian's Wall under Meisner until Meisner and the rest of the resistance are killed by the Black Claw in the season 5 finale "Set Up". In the series finale it is explained that Trubel is a third cousin to Nick on his mother's side of the family.
- Mary Elizabeth Mastrantonio as Nick's mother, Kelly Kessler-Burkhardt. Originally thought to be dead by everyone, including Nick, after she reportedly died in a car accident, Kelly comes to Portland when the Wesen who tried to kill her attempt to seize three powerful coins from Nick. Kelly then takes the coins back to Greece to destroy them. After joining Hadrian's Wall, Kelly helps Adalind Schade and Meisner escape the royals by bringing Adalind back to Portland. She later takes Adalind's daughter away from Portland for safekeeping. Kelly dies in season 4's penultimate episode "The Headache" defending Nick's house from an onslaught of Verrat agents.
- Damien Puckler as Martin Meisner, a human leader within the resistance group Hadrian's Wall and former friend of Sean Renard. Originally serving as a European operative for Hadrian's Wall, Meisner was tasked with protecting the pregnant Adalind Schade and getting her out of Europe. Meisner eventually becomes the leader of Hadrian's Wall's operations in Portland, and recruits both Eve and Trubel into the organization. Meisner is killed in the season 5 finale after Sean Renard leads Conrad Bonaparte and Black Claw to the Hadrian's Wall base, where the Wesen kill all those inside. Renard then shoots his former friend in the head to end his suffering at the hand of the Zauberbiest Bonaparte. Following his death, Meisner appears as a manifestation of Captain Renard's guilt for betraying his friends, but the manifestation saves Renard's life by warning him of an ambush and obscuring the vision of one of the ambushers proving to be more than a manifestation.

== Episodes ==
Many of the episodes are loosely based on stories published by the Brothers Grimm, albeit with considerable artistic license taken. For example, the pilot centered around a wolf-man who preyed on women who wore red (a story along the lines of "Little Red Riding Hood"). Other episodes are based on different sources, including fables and legends, not published by the Brothers Grimm.

Season	Episodes	Originally released		Rank	Average viewership (in millions)
Season	Episodes	First released	Last released	Rank	Average viewership (in millions)
1	22	October 28, 2011	May 18, 2012	89	6.36
2	22	August 13, 2012	May 21, 2013	60	7.06
3	22	October 25, 2013	May 16, 2014	52	7.97
4	22	October 24, 2014	May 15, 2015	65	6.98
5	22	October 30, 2015	May 20, 2016	76	5.97
6	13	January 6, 2017	March 31, 2017	70	6.07

== Production ==
=== Development and filming ===
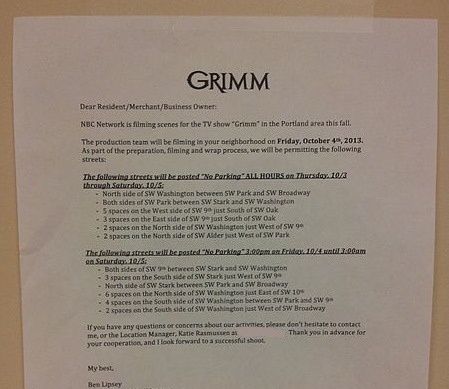
Production notice posted in Portland in October 2013

In 2008, CBS canceled development on a drama called Brother Grimm, written by Stephen Carpenter and produced by CBS Paramount Television and Hazy Mills Productions, because of the 2007–08 writers' strike.

In January 2011, NBC announced that they had given a pilot order to a series titled Grimm, pitched by David Greenwalt and Jim Kouf. The series was produced by Universal Media Studios and Hazy Mills Productions, with Greenwalt and Kouf also serving as executive producers for the series, along with Sean Hayes and Todd Milliner. In May 2011, NBC picked up the pilot to series, eschewing another supernatural police procedural, Ronald D. Moore's 17th Precinct.

Filming on the series began in March 2011, in and around Portland, Oregon. Greenwalt and Kouf told Portland's NBC affiliate KGW that they chose Portland because of its plentiful forests in the city's two largest parks, Washington Park and Forest Park.

On September 30, 2011, NBC delayed the debut of Grimm by one month, moving the premiere to October 28, 2011, so it could premiere closer to Halloween. The series was slated on Friday nights for the majority of its first season. On November 21, 2011, NBC picked up the series for a full 22-episode season. NBC aired a special Thursday screening on December 8, 2011, at 10 pm to analyze whether the network's overall ratings could improve. The creation of the titular Grimm books that are used on the show and featured very prominently were drawn by Oregon artist Carly Sertic

On March 16, 2012, NBC announced that the series had been renewed for a second season; according to writers/producers David Greenwalt and Jim Kouf, they would continue to film the show in Portland, saying, "Rain or shine, Portland has been the ideal setting for fairy tales with its enchanting layout. It is its own character in our show with the perfect mix of urban and rural settings." The second season premiered on Monday, August 13, 2012, and continued on Mondays for four episodes, before returning to its original Friday timeslot on September 10. NBC moved Grimm to Tuesday nights beginning April 30, 2013, for the remainder of Season 2.

The series was renewed for a third season on April 26, 2013. The third season premiered on October 25, 2013, which returned the show to its original Friday timeslot. On March 19, 2014, NBC announced that Grimm had been renewed for a fourth season, which premiered on October 24, 2014.

On February 5, 2015, NBC renewed the series for a fifth season, which premiered on Friday, October 30, 2015.

On April 5, 2016, NBC renewed the series for a sixth season, consisting of 13 episodes. On August 29, 2016, it was announced that season six would serve as the series' final season. The series concluded on March 31, 2017.

=== Casting ===
David Giuntoli was the first to be cast in the series, in the titular role of Nick Burkhardt, in February 2011 He was followed by Silas Weir Mitchell as Monroe, the now-reformed "big bad wolf". Following him, Russell Hornsby and Bitsie Tulloch were cast as Nick's partner Hank and his girlfriend, Juliette, respectively. The following month, Sasha Roiz was cast as a series regular, in the role of Captain Sean Renard.

Bree Turner, who guest starred in four episodes of Season 1 as Rosalee Calvert, was promoted to series regular for Season 2. Claire Coffee, playing Adalind Schade, was also upgraded to series regular for Season 2.

== Reception ==
=== Critical reception ===
The series' premiere received mixed reviews from critics. On review aggregator website Rotten Tomatoes, the first season holds a 54% approval rating based on 37 reviews, with an average rating of 5.4/10. The site's critics consensus reads, "Moody and dark, Grimm gives supernatural fantasy a TV procedural sheen." On Metacritic, the first season has a score of 55 out of 100, based on reviews from 23 critics.

The Hollywood Reporter's Tim Goodman felt that "[i]t has chills and humor and the ability to take a procedural story and twist it." Mike Hale of The New York Times said, "Some of the jokes work, and some of the frights are actually scary, and on a repeat viewing the craftsmanship and attention to detail made more of an impression."

Mary McNamara of the Los Angeles Times wrote in a mixed review that she preferred other fairy-tale themed dramas, such as ABC's Once Upon a Time, stating that despite a good cast and setting, Grimm puts an "entertaining crime spin on fairy-tale monsters that's a little too pat ... [And] adds up to a nice, moody, entertaining-enough hour and the troublesome question of how interesting this will be by the third episode."

Daynah Burnett, who reviewed the program for PopMatters, felt "[a]s Grimm grasps for compelling analogues between fairy tales' villains and ours, its stories turn exceedingly literal: wolves urinate in the corners of their lawns to mark their territory, rather than lurk (and mark) in ways less obvious and more culturally meaningful. There's certainly room here for these archetypes to be explored as the series develops, but when Nick's prime suspect for the red-hoodie crimes turns out to live in an actual cottage in the woods, it doesn't bode well for how these stories might reflect the lives of viewers", before giving it a score of 4 out of 10.

The second season received a more favorable response, with a score of 75 out of 100 on Metacritic, based on four reviews. The season holds a 100% approval rating on Rotten Tomatoes, based on 11 reviews. The critics consensus reads, "Grimm continues expanding upon its own mythology during a darker, thrilling sophomore season." The Los Angeles Times reviewed the second-season premiere as, "it's hard not to love a show with a comely apothecary, and it's impossible not to love the new season of Grimm."

Mike Hale of The New York Times said of season three, "Grimm is not a profound show (what is?), but few are more purely entertaining – engaging, clever, tense, funny, well paced and featuring a remarkably appealing cast as the friends and colleagues who help Nick."

=== Ratings ===
A press release by NBC on November 11, 2011, stated, "Grimm and Up All Night Are the #1 New Drama and #1 New Comedy Among Top % Gainers Going from Live+Same Day to Live+7. Grimm is the #1 new drama on ABC, CBS, NBC or Fox in terms of percentage increase from L+SD to L+7 so far this season and also the #1 new series and the #2 show overall behind only Fox's Fringe (+57%), growing by +49% in adults 18–49 (to a 2.98 rating from a 2.00)" The series averaged about 6.4 million U.S. viewers during its first season, and was consequently renewed for a second season.

By Friday, September 28, 2012, "Grimm" had increased its adult 18-49 rating by 1.14 points going from "live plus same day" ratings to "live plus three day" results from Nielsen Media Research (from a 1.58 to a 2.72). The 1.14 increase was Grimm's biggest gain ever, going from L+SD to L+3. The 2.72 was Grimm's highest L+3 rating since the show's second-season premiere on Monday, August 13.

Viewership and ratings per season of Grimm
Season	Timeslot (ET)	Episodes	First aired		Last aired		TV season	Viewership rank	Avg. viewers (millions)
Season	Timeslot (ET)	Episodes	Date	Viewers (millions)	Date	Viewers (millions)	TV season	Viewership rank	Avg. viewers (millions)
1	Friday 9:00 pm	22	October 28, 2011	6.56	May 18, 2012	5.10	2011–12	89	6.35
2	Monday 10:00 pm (1–4); Friday 9:00 pm (5–18); Tuesday 10:00 pm (19–22)	22	August 13, 2012	5.64	May 21, 2013	4.99	2012–13	61	6.95
3	Friday 9:00 pm	22	October 25, 2013	6.15	May 16, 2014	5.34	2013–14	52	7.97
4	Friday 9:00 pm (1–13); Friday 8:00 pm (14–22)	22	October 24, 2014	5.28	May 15, 2015	4.74	2014–15	65	6.98
5	Friday 9:00 pm	22	October 30, 2015	4.04	May 20, 2016	4.03	2015–16	76	5.97
6	Friday 8:00 pm	13	January 6, 2017	4.49	March 31, 2017	4.33	2016–17	70	6.07

=== Awards and nominations ===
Year	Association	Category	Nominee	Result
2012	Creative Arts Emmy Awards	Outstanding Stunt Coordination	Grimm (Episode: "Woman in Black")	Nominated
2012	People's Choice Awards	Favorite Network TV Drama	Grimm	Nominated
2014	Creative Arts Emmy Awards	Outstanding Stunt Coordination For A Drama Series, Miniseries Or Movie	Matt Taylor	Nominated

== Tie-in work ==
=== Comics ===
In May 2013, Dynamite Entertainment started releasing a monthly Grimm Comic Book series. The series ended with issue #12, which was released April 30, 2014.

=== Books ===
Novelist John Shirley was hired to write the first novel based on the Grimm television show. Grimm: The Icy Touch was published by Titan Books on November 5, 2013, and book 2, Grimm: The Chopping Block, written by John Passarella, was published February 18, 2014. The third novel, Grimm: The Killing Time, was written by Tim Waggoner and was published on September 30, 2014.

== Future ==
=== Cancelled spin-off television series ===
On October 16, 2018, NBC announced that an untitled spin-off of the series was in development. The potential new series would focus on another Grimm (assumed to be Theresa Rubel) and would continue to build off the mythology of the original series. As of June 2021, the project is dead.

=== Film ===
In January 2025, it was reported that a reboot film is in development at Peacock, with the show's co-creators Jim Kouf and David Greenwalt acting as executive producers on the project. It is currently unknown whether it will share the same universe as the original series.

== Broadcast, syndication, and streaming ==
The series premiered in Australia on January 4, 2012, on FOX8, with season two returning on September 30, 2012, followed by season three on October 30, 2013, and season four on January 7, 2015. The series was replayed on free-to-air network Seven (as opposed to FOX8, which is a subscription television network), with season one premiering November 30, 2012, with season two returning on August 1, 2013, and season three on October 15, 2014.

In New Zealand, the series premiered on June 18, 2012, on FOUR.

The series premiered in Canada on October 28, 2011, on CTV, with season two returning on August 13, 2012, followed by season three on October 25, 2013, and season four on October 24, 2014.

The series premiered in the UK on February 13, 2012, on W (known then as Watch), with season two returning on October 22, 2012, and season 3 on February 5, 2014. The fourth season premiered on January 28, 2015. The fifth season premiered on November 3, 2015. The sixth and final season premiered on February 14, 2017.

The series premiered in India on June 30, 2016, on Colors Infinity, with the first five seasons being broadcast back-to-back on weekdays (Monday–Friday). The final season was aired as a part of the network's Instant Premieres programming block, with each episode of season six being aired within 12 hours of its US broadcast.

In the United States, Grimm aired from October 28, 2011, to March 31, 2017, on NBC. Grimm was added to TNT in 2015 and was removed in 2019. Grimm was added to Comet in 2023. All episodes of Grimm were available to stream on The CW's website from 2023 to 2025 and are still available on Peacock.
