= Dedication and Everlasting Love to Animals Rescue =

US animal welfare organization

Coordinates: 34.125°N 118.253°W

- Formation: 1981
- Type: 501(c)(3)
- Tax ID no.: 95-3759277
- Legal status: Federally tax-exempt; No-kill
- Purpose: Animal welfare
- Headquarters: Acton, California, US
- Region served: United States
- Founder: Leo Grillo
- Main organ: Board of Directors
- Revenue: $6,984,782 (2024)
- Expenses: $9,425,327 (2024)
- Website: deltarescue.org

Dedication and Everlasting Love to Animals Rescue (D.E.L.T.A. Rescue) is an animal welfare organization based in Acton, California, US. With two hospitals and 150 acres (0.61 km^{2}) of sanctuaries, it is the largest no-kill, care-for-life sanctuary in the United States. With more than 1,500 animals on the property, it is the largest animal rescue of its type in the world. Leo Grillo is its national president and founder.

In 2024 D.E.L.T.A. Rescue lost a $6.68 million judgment for workplace discrimination and wrongful dismissal of an employee. The organization subsequently entered Chapter 11 bankruptcy proceedings in 2025 as it contested the judgment. In March 2026, Leo Grillo was arrested and accused by the Federal Bureau of Investigation of paying for the kidnapping of the plaintiff in the civil case.

In June 2026, the bankruptcy court approved a compromise settlement between the court-appointed trustee paying the former employee $5.6 million. According to the trustee's report, D.E.L.T.A.'s animal rescue facility with the assistance of the D.E.L.T.A. Rescue's employees but "donations have trended downward over the past numerous months."

== History ==
In 1979, while driving to Bakersfield, California, Grillo rescued a black Dobermann which had been abandoned in the Angeles National Forest. He named the dog Delta, the first of thousands of animals Grillo made it his mission to save. A few months after rescuing his organization's namesake, Grillo discovered a few dozen more castaways during another outing to the forest. He brought them to his family home, which drew the ire of neighbors. Grillo purchased and renovated a condemned kennel for the animals and moved it to his present site in Acton.

In 1989, Grillo set the first traps in a campaign to remove feral cats that for decades had lived on the beachfront rocks along the promenade outside Holiday Inn in Ventura. He received an endorsement of the move from the state Parks and Recreation Department, which controls San Buenaventura State Beach. Grillo said the two dozen cats he rescued were remnants of a sick and dying colony that at one time numbered about 100.

=== Guarded location ===
The sanctuary is located mountaintop in the dry and rugged Sierra Pelona Mountains with no sign at the gate. A security guard watches the entrance 24 hours a day. On rare exceptions, tours are held for donors three times each year. Otherwise, no visitors are allowed.

== Housing ==
Lores is one of 600 previously unwanted cats Grillo and his staff care for on a daily basis.

The dogs are paired off in hundreds of yards with stucco dwellings, wading pools and shade coverings. Hundreds of feral or previously abused and abandoned felines live in more than 40 indoor/outdoor catteries.

=== Straw bale dog house ===
Grillo's more successful housing idea has been a re-discovery of combining straw bales and stucco. The utilization of thick straw and stucco helps create an interior temperature of about 70 degrees Fahrenheit, or 21 degrees Celsius, when the ambient outdoor temperature is close to 100 °F (38 °C), or 37.7 degrees Celsius. The structures are also waterproof. Grillo's eco-friendly straw bale construction technique has been promoted by such animal rights activists worldwide as Maneka Gandhi.

== Medical advancement ==
In association with a physician at UC Davis Veterinary Medical Center, D.E.L.T.A. Rescue established the world's first kidney dialysis center for dogs and cats. D.E.L.T.A. Rescue has a total of two state-of-the-art hospitals that include dog and cat intensive care units, physical therapy and rehabilitation, deep-tissue ultrasound, electrostimulation, treadmill and hydrotherapy. "There are no restrictions on practicing medicine. We treat each animal like a person," said Grillo. "[We keep] them comfortable at all times. Heart disease, geriatrics, cancer, kidney disease and other chronic illness are treated here." D.E.L.T.A. Rescue chief veterinarian Dr. Gaylord Brown says he has no idea how much the medical care costs. "The nice thing about it is, I honestly don't have to worry about that," Brown said. "Leo says, 'You tell me what needs to be done and I'll get out there and see that it happens.'"

=== Animal dialysis ===
To date, the UC Davis Veterinary School has provided dialysis treatments numbering in the thousands to hundreds of dogs and cats which probably would have otherwise had only days to live. The procedure has saved roughly half of the animals, said UC Davis professor Dr. Larry Cowgill. "The contributions that Leo [Grillo] has made have been instrumental in making animal dialysis a reality today," said Cowgill.

== Horse Rescue of America ==
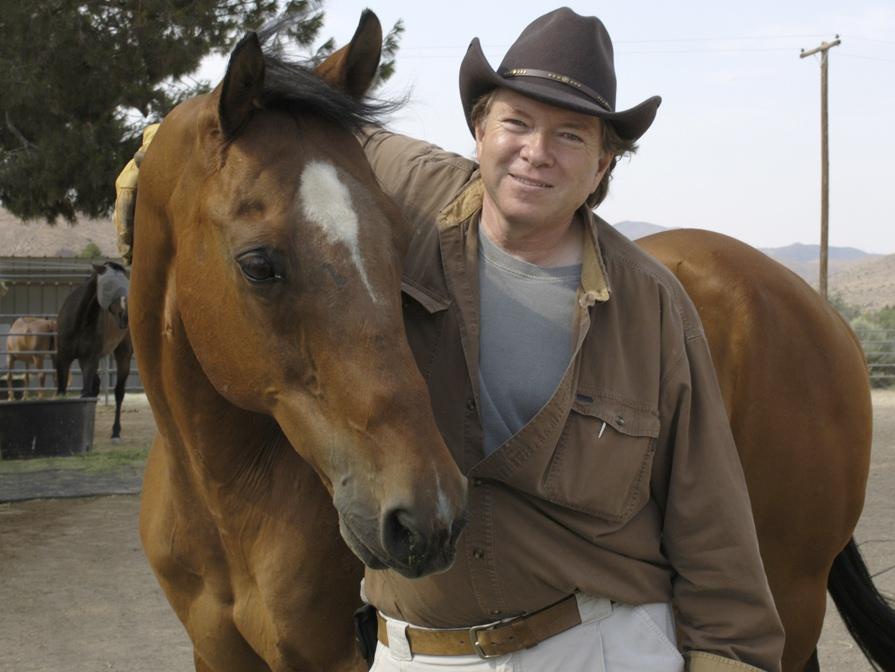
Grillo with Willy at Horse Rescue of America, a care-for-life refuge. Willy was age 5 when he was rescued.

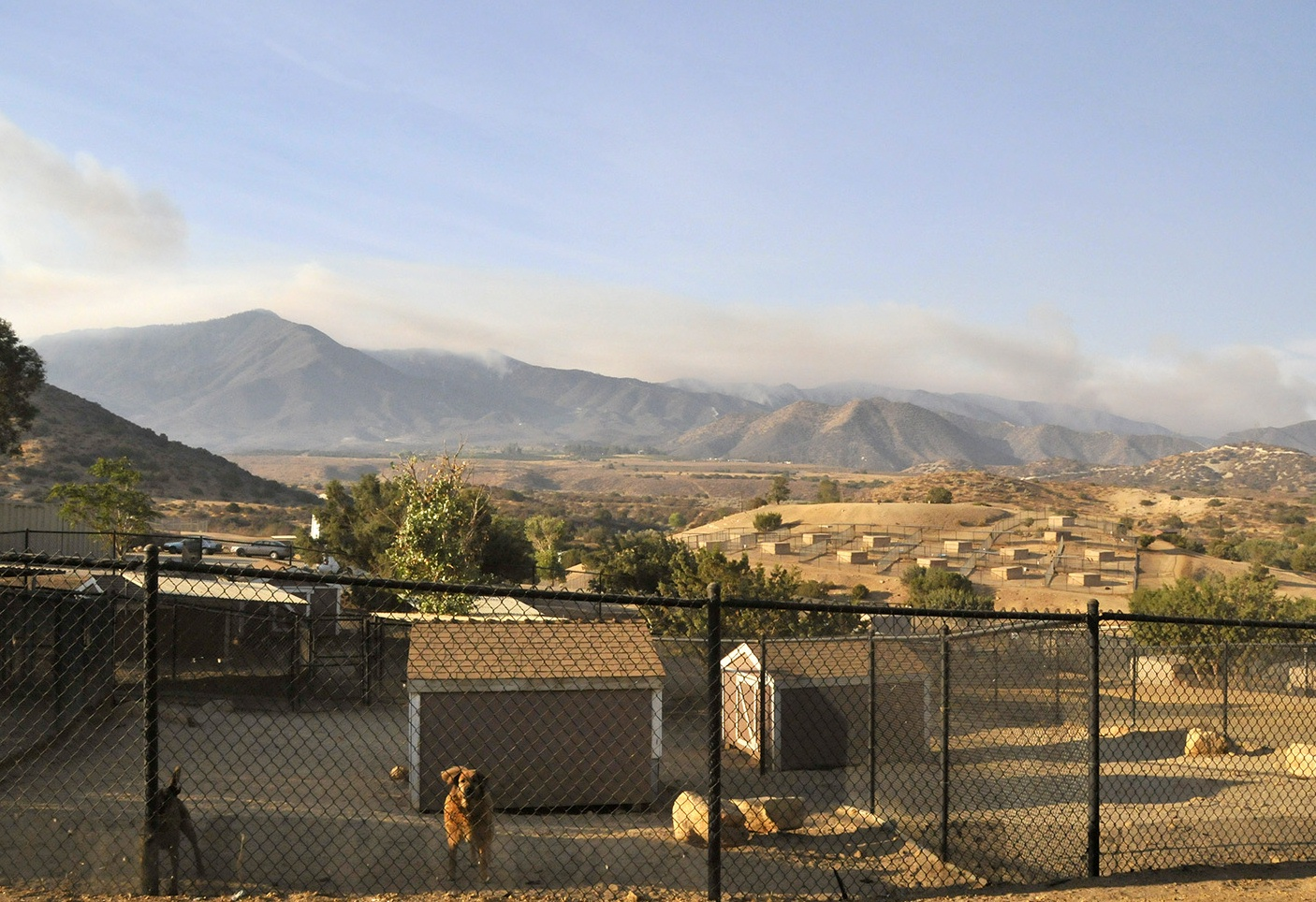
Clear morning skies favored a preemptive air assault, prompting Grillo's call for a federal probe. Hours after this image was recorded, two firefighters were overtaken by a wall of burning mass. Courtesy: Leo Grillo

The D.E.L.T.A. Rescue sanctuary is home to Horse Rescue of America, which houses more than 30 previously forsaken horses. It was established in 1988 for the purpose of saving the lives of wild horses and burros slated for wholesale slaughter in North America.

== 2009 California Wildfires ==
On August 30, 2009, the safety of the D.E.L.T.A. Rescue sanctuary was threatened when a nearby wildfire became treacherous. The arson fire started in La Cañada-Flintridge. Two firefighters were killed after the blaze moved in three directions. During a broadcast on KNX radio, Leo Grillo pleaded for an air assault. On September 28, 2009, Grillo distributed a nationwide press release, calling for a federal probe into circumstances that led up to the blaze. Grillo blamed a lack of air support for the wildfire, which became the largest blaze in the modern-day history of Los Angeles County. "[The United States Forest Service] had the golden opportunity to put it out and they didn't," Grillo said.

On September 30, 2009, U.S. Forest Service officials announced a review of the initial multi-agency response to the 160,000-acre (650 km^{2}) Station Fire amid complaints from Grillo and other residents that the early firefighting effort was poor. In a signed statement on this same day, Arnold Schwarzenegger, Governor of California, applauded the probe. The United States Forest Service administers the nation's 155 national forests. The Station fire blackened more than 250 square miles (650 km^{2}) of the Angeles National Forest.

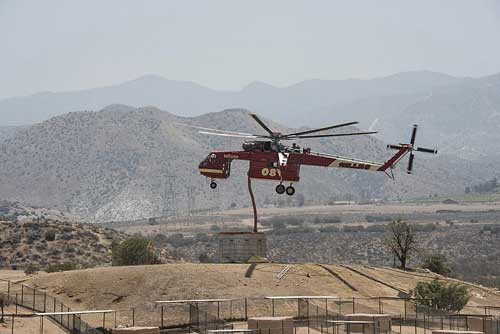
At DELTA Rescue helipad, filling up from the water tanks

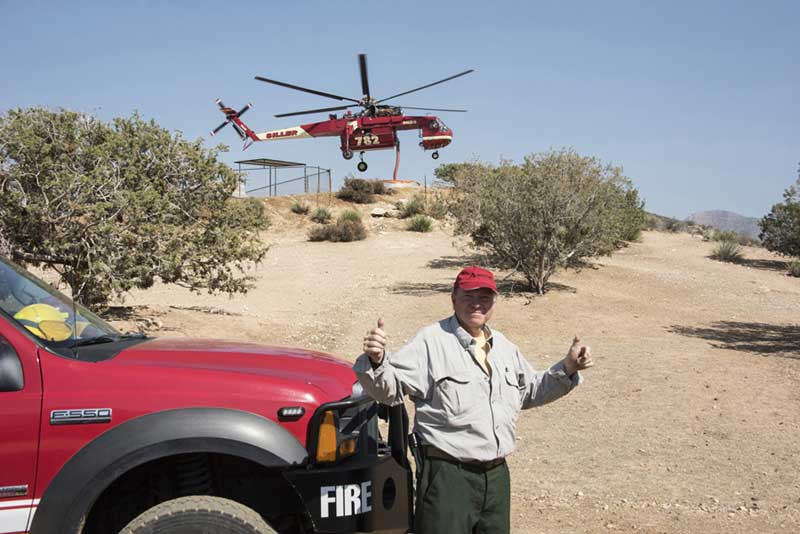
Leo Grillo watching as USFS uses helipad and utilizing water source

== Discrimination lawsuit, bankruptcy and alleged kidnapping conspiracy ==
In 2024 a Los Angeles court ruled against D.E.L.T.A. Rescue in a wrongful dismissal and employment discrimination case. In a deposition Grillo made a number of statements referring to the plaintiff as a “lettuce picker” and a “bimbo” and making statements such as “I don’t speak Mexican.” D.E.L.T.A. Rescue was unsuccessful in suppressing the statements from the trial evidence. The court assessed $6.7 million in damages to the plaintiff. In 2025, D.E.L.T.A. Rescue filed for Chapter 11 bankruptcy protection as it contested the ruling.

In March 2026, Leo Grillo was arrested and accused by the Federal Bureau of Investigation of paying for the kidnapping of the plaintiff in the civil case to avoid paying her.As of July 2026 he is held at Metropolitan Detention Center, Los Angeles awaiting trial.

== Ongoing status ==
In June 2026, the bankruptcy court approved a compromise settlement between the court-appointed trustee and the former employee paying $5.6 million to the latter. According to the trustee's report, D.E.L.T.A.'s animal rescue facility is run with the assistance of its employees but "donations have trended downward over the past numerous months."

In October 2026, a status report by D.E.L.T.A. Rescue's trustee reported that while the organization's board has requested the dismissal of the bankruptcy case, the California Attorney General has requested "an investigation of pre-petition activities by the Debtor’s board members and officers". The trustee also stated that "any future management of the Debtor should not involve or include Leo Grillo".

As of November 2, 2026, Grillo's name, biography and image remain prominently displayed on the website of D.E.L.T.A. Rescue.
