= Amphibious (2010 film) =

- Directed by: Brian Yuzna
- Screenplay by: John Penney; Brian Yuzna
- Story by: San Fu Maltha; Somtow Sucharitkul
- Produced by: San Fu Maltha; Brian Yuzna
- Starring: Michael Paré; Janna Fassaert; Francis Magee
- Cinematography: Mick Van Rossum
- Edited by: Annelies van Woerden
- Music by: Fons Merkies
- Production companies: Fu Works; Komodo Films; Komodo Dragon
- Distributed by: Queen Imperial Films
- Release dates: 12 October 2010 (Sitges); 1 November 2010 (Netherlands)
- Running time: 83 minutes
- Countries: Indonesia; Netherlands
- Language: English

Amphibious is a 2010 thriller natural-horror film directed by Brian Yuzna and written by Yuzna, John Penney, Somtow Sucharitkul and San Fu Maltha. It stars Francis Magee, Janna Fassaert and Michael Paré.

== Plot ==
Skyler Shane, a marine biologist, meets Jack Bowman, at a northern Sumatran lake to search for prehistoric samples. During this expedition, they encounter some smugglers who have their headquarters on the lake. Tamal, an orphan who was sold to the smugglers as a slave, begs Skyler to save her. Since the child reminds Skyler of her lost daughter Rebecca, she agrees, not knowing what secret is lurking in the water. Ever since Tamal has been on the lake, strange things have been happening: more and more people disappear and are devoured by a creature from the deep.

== Cast ==
- Monica Sayangbati as Tamal
- Janna Fassaert as Skylar Shane
- Michael Paré as Jack Bowman
- Dorman Borisman as Bimo
- Francis Bosco as Boss Harris
- Francis Magee as Jimmy Kudrow
- Verdi Solaiman as Andi
- Mohammad Aditya as Big Rudi
- Ronald Reagen as Rizal
- Herlian Ujang as Nanung
- Mikael C. Jehian as Aris
- Bambang Budi Santoso as Dukun
- Ida Jessica Peter as Rebekka "Bekka" Shane
- Joshua Pandelaki as Santoso
- Timo Ottevanger as Logan
- Elke Salverda as Julie

== Production ==
This was Yuzna's first film as director since the 2005 film Beneath Still Waters. The film was also the first Dutch 3D production and was filmed in summer 2009 at various locations in Indonesia.

== Release ==
The theatrical release date for the film in the Netherlands was 1 November 2010.
