= Desolation Canyon (film) =

2006 TV film

- Film poster
- Written by: Dan Fitzsimons
- Directed by: David S. Cass Sr.
- Starring: Stacy Keach; Patrick Duffy
- Music by: Joe Kraemer
- Country of origin: United States
- Original language: English

Production
- Executive producers: Robert Halmi Jr. Larry Levinson
- Producers: Brian J. Gordon; Erik Olson
- Cinematography: Brian Shanley
- Editor: Jennifer Jean Cacavas
- Running time: 80 minutes
- Production company: Hallmark Entertainment

Original release
- Network: Hallmark Channel
- Release: July 1, 2006

Desolation Canyon is a 2006 American Western television film starring Stacy Keach and Patrick Duffy. The film was written by Dan Fitzsimons, directed by David S. Cass Sr. and premiered on Hallmark Channel on July 1, 2006.

== Plot ==
After a bank robbery, the responsible gang stops by the home of one of their band's estranged wife to abduct his own young son. The town's old sheriff (Patrick Duffy) calls for the help of a retired gunfighter (Stacy Keach), who is also the abducted boy's grandfather. Hot on the trail of the fugitives, they discover that two bounty hunters are already in pursuit of the gang for crimes committed in Mexico.

== Cast ==
- Stacy Keach as Samuel Kendrick
- Patrick Duffy as Sheriff Tomas 'Swede' Lundstrom
- Kenneth Johnson as Press Reynolds
- Yvonne DeLaRosa as Alejandra Kendrick
- Kelly Overton as Olivia Kendrick
- David Rees Snell as Edwin
- Courtney Gains as Jack
- Victor Browne as Johnny Kendrick
- A Martinez as Arturo Zetta
- Cubbie Kile as Molly Kendrick
- Michael Patrick McGill as Cecil 'Slim' Moldin
- Franc Ross as Cleon Winters
- Drake Johnston as Abe Kendrick
- Tom Kiesche as Billy McAllister

== Reception ==
Entertainment Weekly's critic gave the film a C+ rating. However, the film achieved some success; it achieved 2.4 HH (household) ratings, and it was the highest-rated ad-supported cable movie of the day, with nearly 1.8 million homes.
