= They Are Among Us =

2004 television film directed by Jeffrey Obrow

- Genre: Science Fiction; Thriller
- Screenplay by: Lars Hauglie
- Story by: Lars Hauglie; Jeffrey Obrow
- Directed by: Jeffrey Obrow
- Starring: Alison Eastwood; Michael Orr Hughes; Anne Apra
- Country of origin: United States
- Original language: English

Production
- Executive producer: Steve Swanson
- Producers: Peter Liedel; Jeffrey Obrow; Shannon Gardner; Tania Trepanier
- Cinematography: Mateo Londono
- Editor: Chris McKinley
- Running time: 120 minutes
- Production company: Barnholtz Entertainment

Original release
- Network: The Sci-Fi Channel
- Release: July 17, 2004

They Are Among Us is a 2004 American made-for-television science fiction thriller film directed by Jeffrey Obrow, written by Lars Hauglie, and starring Alison Eastwood, Michael Orr Hughes and Anne Apra.

== Premise ==
The film is about a town that is populated by aliens who have been posing as humans in order to steal the Earth's resources they need to live when the time comes.

== Cast ==
- Alison Eastwood as Finley
- Michael Orr Hughes as Uncle Bob
- George Buck Flower as Old Chuck
- Anne Apra as Boy's Mother
- Lacey Beeman as Devon
- Corbin Bernsen as Norbert
- Bruce Boxleitner as Hugh

== Reception ==
Scott Weinberg at DVDTalk.com gave a negative review: "It's certainly not awful enough to give you a migraine, but They Are Among Us just feels like an oft-told tale, retold (yet again) with very little ingenuity."
