= Rat Fink (film) =

1965 film by James Landis

- Theatrical poster
- Directed by: James Landis
- Screenplay by: James Landis
- Story by: Matthew Cheney; Jack Miller
- Produced by: Schuyler Hayden
- Starring: Schuyler Hayden; Hal Bokar; Judy Hughes; Warrene Ott; Don Snyder; Eve Brenner; Alice Reinheart; Jack Lester
- Cinematography: Vilmos Zsigmond
- Edited by: Tom Boutross
- Music by: Ronald Stein
- Production company: Genesis Entertainment
- Distributed by: Cinema Distributors of America (United States); Peerless Films (Canada)
- Release date: December 22, 1965 (United States)
- Running time: 80 minutes
- Country: United States
- Language: English
- Budget: $200,000

Rat Fink (a.k.a. My Soul Runs Naked) is a 1965 crime thriller film written and directed by James Landis. He adapted it from the story composed by Matthew Cheney and Jack Miller. The film stars Schuyler Hayden (who also produced), Hal Bokar, Judy Hughes, Warrene Ott, Don Snyder, Eve Brenner, Alice Reinheart, and Jack Lester. The surf rock band The Futuras also make a guest appearance.

== Plot ==
Lonnie Price is a sadistic, psychopathic drifter who aspires to be a star, and will do whatever necessary to achieve that goal. He soon becomes an overnight sensation as a singer. While fleeing from the cops, he loses his guitar in the process. He seduces an older woman, then robs her before leaving. He impregnates a younger girl, then subsequently forces her to get an abortion. While strolling, Lonnie happens upon a concert venue where Tommy Loomis is having a concert. Lonnie envies him and his screaming female fans, so he engineers an "accident". Several days later, Lonnie appears at Tommy's manager's office, impressing him with his audition. Quickly, Lonnie ascends to the top, living a decadent pop star life. But it is not long before he gradually begins to descend into a vortex of chaos, marked by rape, murder, and a catastrophic conclusion.

== Cast ==
- Schuyler Hayden as Lonnie Price
- Hal Bokar as Paul Finlay
- Judy Hughes as Betty Larsen
- Warrene Ott as Vera Finlay
- Don Snyder as Tommy Loomis
- Eve Brenner as Mrs. Dunkirk
- Alice Reinheart as Lonnie's mother
- Jack Lester as Lonnie's father
- The Futuras as themselves

== Rediscovery ==
The film was once considered a lost film for over 50 years, before a sole surviving print was discovered.

== Reception ==
Cary Watson of Jettison Cocoon states that "[James] Landis brings the same bleakness and nastiness" that he did with his previous film, The Sadist (1963).
