= The Dorm That Dripped Blood =

1982 film by Stephen Carpenter and Jeffrey Obrow

- 1982 theatrical poster under original title
- Directed by: Stephen Carpenter; Jeffrey Obrow
- Screenplay by: Stephen Carpenter; Jeffrey Obrow; Stacey Giachino
- Produced by: Jeffrey Obrow
- Starring: Laurie Lapinski; Stephen Sachs
- Cinematography: Stephen Carpenter
- Edited by: Stephen Carpenter; Jeffrey Obrow
- Music by: Christopher Young
- Production company: Jeff Obrow Productions
- Distributed by: New Image Releasing
- Release date: April 30, 1982
- Running time: 84 minutes
- Country: United States
- Language: English
- Budget: $150,000
- Box office: $215,000

The Dorm That Dripped Blood (Note: The film was first released under the title Pranks in 1982, and was re-released under the alternate title The Dorm That Dripped Blood in 1983.) is a 1982 American slasher film directed by Stephen Carpenter and Jeffrey Obrow, written by Carpenter, Obrow, and Stacey Giachino, and starring Laurie Lapinski, Stephen Sachs, David Snow, Pamela Holland, and Daphne Zuniga in her film debut. It follows a group of college students who stay on campus over the Christmas holiday to clean out a condemned dormitory, where an unknown assailant begins stalking and murdering them.

Filmed at UCLA from December 1980 to January 1981, the film was originally released in the USA and the UK under the title Pranks in 1982. When its distributors found this title non-conducive to box-office sales, the film was retitled "The Dorm That Dripped Blood" and re-released in 1983.

In the UK, it faced significant censorship due to its graphic violence, resulting in its inclusion on the BBFC's "video nasty" list, though it was later removed. Critical commentary from genre scholars in the ensuing years has heralded the film for its nihilistic conclusion, which challenged the emerging "final girl" trope in slasher films.

== Plot ==
On a college campus, a young male coed is chased and killed by an unseen assailant. Meanwhile, Joanne Murray and her boyfriend, Tim, attend a campus party and learn that their dormitory, Morgan Meadows Hall, has been condemned. Along with friends Brian, Patty, Craig, and Debbie, Joanne is staying behind during the Christmas holiday to help clear the building ahead of its demolition. Tim leaves for a holiday skiing trip the next day, while Debbie reveals that she cannot stay because her parents are picking her up later that day.

Debbie's parents arrive in the evening and wait for Debbie, who is searching for Joanne's inventory list. Her father leaves the car to find her, only to be bludgeoned by an unseen killer with a spiked baseball bat. Her mother, Doris, is then strangled in the car with a garrote. Debbie finds their bodies and faints in horror. The killer drags Debbie's body behind the car and crushes her head by backing over it before driving away with all three corpses in the trunk.

The next day, Patty sees a vagrant named John Hemmit near the campus dump site. Later that day, the caretaker, Bill Edgar, complains that one of his drills has been stolen, while Joanne muses that John took it. Joanne meets Bobby Lee Tremble, a local salesman, purchasing some of the tables from the dorm. Not long after, Bill is killed in the bathroom with the stolen drill. The following day, Craig and Bryan see John walking by the dorm and try to warn him away. The group plays pool that evening, but their game is interrupted when Patty sees John peering in at them through a window. Taking matters into their own hands, the group searches for John around the building but fails to find him.

The group prepares dinner when Craig notices some of the missing food and sees John fleeing. While the group searches again for him, the killer smashes their dinner table with the spiked bat. Returning and seeing the mess, they call the police and report John. Later that night, Joanne hears footsteps on the dorm's roof and calls the others to her room when the power cuts out. On his way to the room, Brian encounters someone shining a torch in his face before he is attacked. Patty and Craig make it to Joanne's room, but Bryan does not show up, so Joanne stays behind while Craig and Patty go downstairs to reconnect the power. In the kitchen, they get separated, and Patty is grabbed from behind and knocked unconscious by the killer, who then drops her into an industrial pressure cooker and closes the lid.

Craig makes it back to Joanne's room, claiming he was knocked unconscious and that he cannot find Patty anywhere. John eventually corners Joanne while she discovers Brian's mutilated corpse in a storage room. She flees from him and makes it back to Craig. The two team up and manage to kill John. At this point, Craig reveals that he was the killer and that John knew and was trying to warn Joanne. After being chased by Craig, Joanne is shown the corpses of Patty, Debbie, and her family. Craig explains that he loves her and has gotten rid of anyone who clung to her or who ruined his chances of being with her.

Joanne attempts to flee again when Bobby appears. Craig knocks Joanne unconscious before being cornered by Bobby. The police arrive and believe Bobby is the prowler the group had reported, and shoot him down when he attempts to kill Craig. The police leave to obtain reinforcements and medical help, while Craig resolves to kill Joanne. With Joanne still unconscious, Craig dumps her body into an incinerator and seemingly escapes while the police outside wonder if the smoke emanating from the incinerator exhaust vent should smell so bad.

== Cast ==
- Laurie Lapinski as Joanne Murray
- Stephen Sachs as Craig
- David Snow as Brian
- Pamela Holland as Patty
- Dennis Ely as Bobby Lee Tremble
- Woody Rollas as John Hemmit
- Daphne Zuniga as Debbie
- Jake Jones as Bill Edgar
- Robert Fredrickson as Tim (as Robert Frederick)
- Chris Morrill as Jack
- Chandre as Alice
- Billy Criswell as Rick
- Richard Cowgill as Debbie's Father
- Kay Beth as Debbie's Mother
- Jimmy Betz as Officer Lewis
- Thomas Christian as Officer Dean
- Robert Richardson as Policeman
- Chris Schroeder as Policeman
- Leesa Gallentine as Nancy (uncredited)

== Production ==
=== Conception and casting ===
Inspired by Friday the 13th, Stephen Carpenter co-wrote the script with Stacey Giachino while film students at UCLA. The original title of the film was The Third Night, and later became Death Dorm after production wrapped. To secure funding for the film, Obrow and Carpenter shot footage for a pre-emptive promotional trailer in order to pitch the film to investors.

Casting was done by Obrow and Carpenter, independent of a casting director, as they could not afford to hire one. In the film, the casting director is credited as "Wesley Lou David", which is an amalgam of the directors' and producers' middle names. The film marked actress Daphne Zuniga's feature debut.

=== Filming ===
The film was shot primarily on the UCLA campus in and around the film school building, and in the UCHA. The cinematography was completed using the university's equipment, and the film was shot primarily on handheld Eclair cameras on 16 mm film, which had to subsequently be blown up to 35 mm.

As it is set, the bulk of the film was shot over Christmas vacation at the university over a period of around three weeks in December 1980 and January 1981, and additional photography was completed over the ensuing six months. The film's special effects were designed by Matthew W. Mungle, who went on to become a multi-Academy Award nominee for his makeup and special effects work.

== Release ==
=== Censorship ===
To avoid an X rating, the film was cut substantially by the MPAA in the USA, and by the BBFC in the UK, with portions of the murder scenes truncated or nearly edited out entirely. The murder scene of Debbie's father (Richard Cowgill) with the spiked baseball bat was significantly trimmed down to show only one or two blows to the head, and the footage of the maintenance man Bill Edgar (Jake Jones) being drilled through the head with the power drill was excised entirely.

Upon the film's release in the UK (under the title Pranks), it was deemed a video nasty, which Carpenter and Obrow surmise was due to the graphic drill murder sequence, and for the cover artwork which depicted the spiked baseball bat. It was assumed that the BBFC had worries that, because the killing weapon was depicted clearly, it was imitable. However, the film was not successfully prosecuted and was removed from the list. It was eventually re-released on video in 1992 with ten seconds of cuts to the aforementioned drill murder.

=== Theatrical run ===
Though originally titled by the filmmakers as Death Dorm, New Image Releasing distributed the film in the United States and Canada under the alternate title Pranks. It opened under this title in Miami and Louisville, Kentucky on April 30, 1982. In Canada, the film screened in Toronto beginning May 7, 1982 and in Edmonton, Calgary, and Victoria beginning May 27, 1982. The film's theatrical release in the United states expanded on September 10, 1982 to several other cities, including Atlanta and Indianapolis.

After the distributors found the title unsatisfactory and non-conducive to box office sales, the film was re-released as The Dorm That Dripped Blood on July 15, 1983 in Baltimore and later expanded that fall to 40 U.S. theaters on September 23, 1983. In the United Kingdom, it was released exclusively under the Pranks title through New Line Cinema.

=== Home media ===
The film was released on DVD in the United States by Eclectic DVD Distribution on December 2, 2003, under its original title, Pranks. On April 26, 2011, Synapse Films released a Blu-ray-DVD combination set of the film under its better-known title, The Dorm That Dripped Blood. This Blu-ray release features the original 88-minute uncensored directors' cut, featuring the title card of Death Dorm, that had previously never been seen by the public, featuring additional and extended gore and exposition sequences.

== Reception ==
=== Box office ===
During the film's second expanded theatrical run in the fall of 1983, it grossed $215,000.

=== Critical response ===
Critic Stephen Hunter, writing for The Baltimore Sun, compared the film unfavorably against other slasher films of the time, noting that, "even featuring nine grisly killings... the film is almost energy-less." Candice Russell of the Fort Lauderdale News panned the film as "the kind of hopelessly sloppy amateurism that would be laughed right out of a beginning film class." The Miami Herald's Bill Cosford described it as "a by-the-book splatter film, unrelieved by production values or performing skill." Patrick Taggart of the Austin American-Statesman criticized the film's technical elements, deeming them "poorly lighted and clumsily staged... Pranks is exploitation pure and simple, with no distinction in any technical or artistic aspect." John A. Douglas, writing for The Grand Rapids Press, similarly described the film as being of "poor quality." Gene Siskel picked it as one of his "Dogs of the Week" for a 1982 Sneak Previews show, declaring it to be another "women in danger" slasher film.

The film received mixed assessments from Ira Vine of The Hamilton Spectator, who noted that the "chases, fights and killings are all well-handled, building suspense with skillful camera-work. The parts in-between, though, suffer from sloppy editing and writing."

=== Modern assessment ===
In a retrospective assessment of the film, journalist Jim Harper called the film "one of the best of the low budget eighties slashers. Even though the material is pretty derivative, the direction shows promise, and the script could have been a lot worse". Film journalist Adam Rockoff gave the film a negative assessment, calling it a "bland and uninspired slasher", adding: "The Dorm That Dripped Blood attempts one meager stab at originality by killing off the final girl in the film's last scene. This unnecessary, downbeat ending is actually a relief, for it signals not only an end to her annoying self-righteousness, but to the film as a whole". Critic and film historian John Kenneth Muir championed the film's downbeat conclusion, writing in Horror Films of the 1980s (2010): "Some writers have expressed the idea that The Dorm That Dripped Blood is depressing because all heroes lose. In such a predictable subgenre, however, invention ought to be championed rather than attacked."

In a retrospective for Bloody Disgusting, Paul Lê commended the film's mood and tone, writing: "What The Dorm That Dripped Blood lacks in general memorability it makes up for in gloominess. This film has little in the way of charismatic characters, action, or set pieces, yet the outcome is quite wretched, even by slasher standards. The so-so story goes out on a brilliantly bleak note, one that deserves more recognition in conversations about grim Christmas horror."

The Dorm That Dripped Blood holds an approval rating of 0% on movie review aggregator website Rotten Tomatoes, based on five critic reviews.

Cavett Binion of AllMovie qualified it as a "derivative slasher clone", awarding it 1.5 out of 5 stars. Film scholar John Stanley, in Creature Features: The Science Fiction, Fantasy, and Horror Movie Guide (2000), awarded the film one out of five stars.

== See also ==
- List of films with a 0% rating on Rotten Tomatoes
- Video nasty

== Sources ==
- Carpenter, Stephen; Obrow, Jeffrey (2011). The Dorm That Dripped Blood (Blu-ray audio commentary). Synapse Films.
- DuPée, Matthew C. (2022). A Scary Little Christmas: A History of Yuletide Horror Films, 1972-2020. Jefferson, North Carolina: McFarland & Company. ISBN 978-1-476-64540-7.
- Harper, Jim (2004). Legacy of Blood: A Comprehensive Guide to Slasher Movies. Manchester, England: Critical Vision. ISBN 978-1-900-48639-2.
- Muir, John Kenneth (2010). Horror Films of the 1980s. Vol. 2. Jefferson, North Carolina: McFarland & Company. ISBN 978-0-786-45501-0.
- Rockoff, Adam (2011). Going to Pieces: The Rise and Fall of the Slasher Film, 1978–1986. Jefferson, North Carolina: McFarland & Company. ISBN 978-0-786-46932-1.
- Stanley, John (2000). Creature Features: The Science Fiction, Fantasy, and Horror Movie Guide. New York City, New York: Berkley Boulevard Books. ISBN 978-0-425-17517-0.
