= David S. Cass Sr. =

American film director (1942–2020)

David Stanley Cass Sr. (March 21, 1942 – August 28, 2020) was a film director and stuntman. He directed Hard Time: The Premonition, Avenging Angel, Desolation Canyon, and Thicker than Water.

Cass began his film career as an extra. He alternated between acting and stunt work, starting with McLintock! (1963), on which he performed stunts. He went on to become a stunt coordinator and second unit director on Smokey and the Bandit Part 3, Knight Rider 2000, Walker, Texas Ranger and the Desperado TV movie franchise. He later focused on TV directing, with dozens of credits.

== Filmography as actor ==
Year	Title	Role	Notes
1969	The Good Guys and the Bad Guys	Tuber	Uncredited
1970	Suppose They Gave a War and Nobody Came	Deputy Dave	
1970	Dirty Dingus Magee	Trooper #4	
1972	Enter the Devil	Jase	
1973	The Boy Who Cried Werewolf	Deputy	
1974	Earthquake	Sherriff Merle – Slade's Nemesis	Uncredited
1975	The Master Gunfighter	McDonald	
1976	Treasure of Matecumbe	Spangler's Man #4	
1976	Two-Minute Warning	Green's Henchman #2	
1977	Mr. Billion	Boss Kidnapper	
1977	The Island of Dr. Moreau	Bearman	
1977	The Goodbye Girl	Drunk	
1978	Hot Lead and Cold Feet	Jack	
1979	The Apple Dumpling Gang Rides Again	Henchman #2	
1980	Hotwire	Bruno	
1980	Heaven's Gate	Moustached Mercenary	
1981	Benson	Man with Cigar	
1981	Buck Rogers in the 25th Century	Major Jason Samos	
1982	Tron	Factory Guard	
1982	Endangered Species	Wes	
1983	Smokey and the Bandit Part 3	Local Tough Guy	
1983	Flicks	Lou	(segment "Philip Alien")
1987	My Demon Lover	Grady's Partner	
1987	Best Seller	Cop in Depository	
