= Few Options =

- Theatrical release poster
- Directed by: George Pappy
- Edited by: Giacomo Ambrosini
- Music by: Victoria Kelly
- Release date: July 1, 2011
- Running time: 90 minutes
- Country: United States
- Language: English

Few Options, also known as Few Options, All Bad, is a 2011 American feature-length crime drama written and directed by George Pappy.

== Plot summary ==
When a convicted drug smuggler leaves prison after 22 years for one youthful mistake, he just wants to start over and obey the law. But, unable to find work, he's forced to take a supposedly legitimate job with his old crime partners. And they have big plans for their newest employee.

== Cast ==
- Kenny Johnson as Frank Connor
- Erin Daniels as Helen Martin
- David Marciano as Russ
- Brad Dourif as Chris Pendler
- Rainn Wilson as Cousin Don
- Michael Sheen as The Florist
- Laura San Giacomo as The Ticket Agent
- Dayton Callie as Warden Winslow
- Christian Stokes as Mike Colton
- Cindy Baer as Jillian

== Exhibition ==
The film had its U.S. debut at The Valley Film Festival on November 12, 2011. The film was first televised in the U.S. on Showtime on April 23, 2012.
