= Kenny Johnson =

American actor (born 1963)

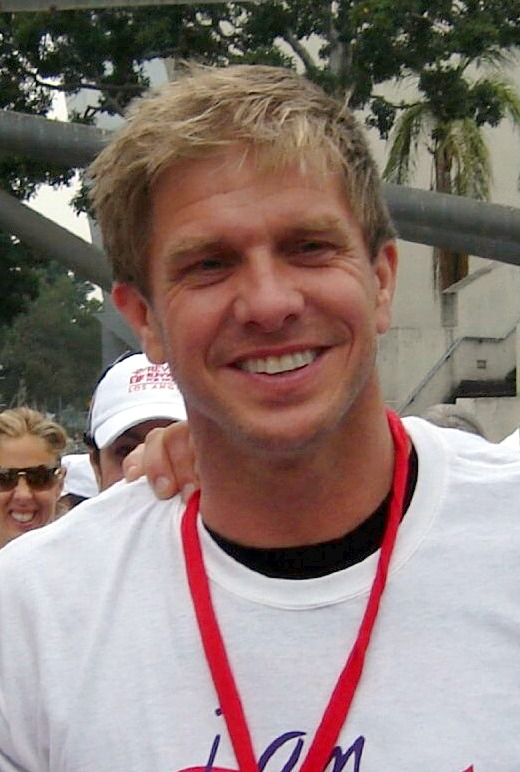
- Johnson in 2007
- Born: July 13, 1963 (age 63); New Haven, Connecticut, U.S.
- Occupation: Actor
- Years active: 1990–present
- Spouse: Cathleen Oveson (m. 2005)
- Children: 1

Kenny Johnson (born July 13, 1963) is an American actor. He is known for his roles as Detective Curtis Lemansky in The Shield, Butch "Burner" Barnes in Pensacola: Wings of Gold, Detective Ham Dewey in Saving Grace, Herman Kozik in Sons of Anarchy, Matt Webb in Prime Suspect, Caleb Calhoun in Bates Motel, Dominique Luca in the CBS drama series S.W.A.T., and Tommy Welch on Chicago Fire (2014–2015).

== Early life ==
Johnson was born in New Haven, Connecticut, and was raised on a 30-acre farm in Weathersfield, Vermont. For his college education, he attended Central Connecticut State University, where he played football and basketball.

Prior to starting his acting career, Johnson spent approximately four years modelling for agencies including Wilhelmina and Ford Models. This path led to him living for a year in Boston, Massachusetts, before finally settling in Los Angeles, California, where he eventually found acting.

== Career ==
Johnson got his start in television commercials, including one of the first ads for LA Gear. A former champion arm wrestler, he appeared as bit characters in various television programs, such as Family Matters, Grace Under Fire, Caroline in the City, Pensacola: Wings of Gold, Sliders, 18 Wheels of Justice, Just Shoot Me!, NCIS: Los Angeles, Lie to Me, Law & Order: Special Victims Unit and The Protector.

In 1998, he appeared in the first several minutes of the first Blade, as Heatseeking Dennis, who was saved from a vampire played by Traci Lords. In October 2005, he appeared in the Smallville season 5 episode "Mortal" as metahuman Tommy Lee. He also appeared in the 2006 Hallmark Channel original film Desolation Canyon, with Stacy Keach and Patrick Duffy. Johnson then starred in the 2005 film Zzyzx, a thriller about two friends who take a detour on their way to Las Vegas.

Johnson originally auditioned for the role of ill-fated Terry Crowley in The Shield, which ultimately went to Reed Diamond. Casting directors were so impressed with his audition that they asked Johnson to come in for the role of Curtis Lemansky. He was unsure of how to go about the character, as the role was not very developed at that point. During the audition, Johnson made some choices for the character that he initially thought ruined his chances of winning the role. However, the audition turned out to be successful and he was cast. Lemansky quickly became a major player in the first season because of the chemistry Johnson shared with his castmates.

After The Shield, Johnson had recurring roles in Cold Case, first as a supposed murder victim and later as a love interest for Lilly Rush. He was later cast in the TNT series Saving Grace, as Detective Hamilton "Ham" Dewey. Johnson appeared during the second, third, and fourth seasons of Sons of Anarchy as sergeant-at-arms and biker Herman Kozik. He also directed and starred in the short film, I Heard the Mermaids Singing.

In August 2010, Johnson appeared in the Fox series Lie to Me, along with several fellow cast members from The Shield. In 2011, Johnson appeared in Lifetime's series The Protector, with fellow Sons of Anarchy co-star Ally Walker. Johnson also appeared as a regular in NBC's crime drama series Prime Suspect, playing the contractor boyfriend of the lead character, Detective Jane Timoney (Maria Bello). Also in 2011, Johnson starred as Frank Connor, a convicted drug smuggler who leaves prison after 22 years for one youthful mistake, in Few Options. In 2012, he guest starred as Tyler Gray in the sixth season of Burn Notice, and as Greg Marshall in the fourth season of The Mentalist. That following year, Johnson portrayed U.S. Marshal Max Clayton in the eighth and final season of Dexter.

Johnson appeared as Caleb Calhoun, the estranged brother of Norma Bates (Vera Farmiga), in the A&E drama-thriller series Bates Motel. He recurred in the second season, became a main cast member for the third season, and guest starred in the fourth and fifth seasons. He was then a recurring cast member in the fifth season of Covert Affairs, playing former CIA paramilitary operative James Decker. Johnson co-starred in the 2015 thriller film Solace. In August 2015, it was reported that Johnson would be part of the main cast for the second season of ABC's anthology series Secrets and Lies.

From 2017 to 2024, Johnson portrayed main character Officer Dominique Luca in the CBS drama series S.W.A.T., based on the 2003 film of the same name, but the series also closely follows the original 1975–76 ABC series, also of the same name.

== Personal life ==
He married his long-term girlfriend, Cathleen Oveson on December 21, 2005. They have one child, Angelica Scarlet (born 7 May 2009). Angelica is also an actress, most notably in a recurring role on S.W.A.T. as Kelly, where the character played by the elder Johnson, Dominique Luca, becomes her mentor.

On July 18, 2018, Johnson suffered unspecified injuries while filming the premiere episode of the second season of S.W.A.T. The scene involved Johnson simulating Luca hanging from the landing gear of a helicopter while the helicopter flies away. Johnson later sued the production company, Sony, over the incident. The case was settled in February 2023—the terms of the settlement have not been disclosed.

Johnson has dyslexia and has spoken publicly about it to raise awareness and to combat stigma.

== Filmography ==
=== Film ===
Year	Title	Role	Notes
1990	The Forbidden Dance	Dave	
1990	Mirage	Greg	
1995	Bushwhacked	State Patrolman	
1998	Archibald the Rainbow Painter		
1998	Major League: Back to the Minors	Lance "The Dance" Pere	
1998	Blade	Heatseeking Dennis	
2001	Under Heavy Fire	Jimmy Joe	
2006	Desolation Canyon	Reynolds	
2006	Zzyzx	Lou	
2007	The Ungodly	Officer Murphy	
2008	I Heard the Mermaids Singing	Al	Short film; also director
2011	Few Options	Frank Connor	Also co-producer
2013	Timmy Muldoon and the Search for the Shadoweyes Bandit	Shotgun Lenny	Video short
2015	Solace	David Raymond	
2015	Blue	David Murphy	
2016	Run the Tide	Bo	
2017	Check Point	Roy Boyle	Also producer
2021	Howl	Levi	
2023	Nine Ball	Nicky	

=== Television ===
Year	Title	Role	Notes
1992	Red Shoe Diaries	Tracer	2 episodes
1993	The Webbers	Chuck	Television film
1993	Family Matters	Gorgeous Waiter	Episode: "Walk on the Wild Side"
1994	Grace Under Fire	Skip	Episode: "June 15, 1997"
1994	Something Wilder	Chad	Episode: "Love Native American Style"
1996	Pacific Blue	Deke	Episode: "Over the Edge"
1996	Caroline in the City	Blair	Episode: "Caroline and the Ex-Wife"
1996	The Big Easy	George Stodermayer	Episode: "Stodermayer"
1996	Sliders	Slain Skater	Episode: "The Dream Masters"
1996	The Burning Zone	Dr. Jake Lietman	Episode: "Blood Covenant"
1997	Sins of the Mind	Anders	Pilot episode
1999	Just Shoot Me!	Brian McDonald	Episode: "The Odd Couple (Part 2)"
1999	Ryan Caulfield: Year One	Detective Billy Zabo	Episode: "A Night at the Gashole"
1998–2000	Pensacola: Wings of Gold	Butch "Burner" Barnes	Main cast (season 2), 27 episodes Guest Star (Season 3), 3 episodes.
2001	The Huntress	Kevin Styles	2 episodes
2001	18 Wheels of Justice	Sonny	Episode: "Crossing the Line"
2002–2006	The Shield	Detective Curtis Lemansky	Main cast, 66 episodes
2002	One on One	Brandon	Episode: "The Way You Make Me Feel"
2003	Boomtown	Robert "Bobby" Cherry	Episode: "Haystack"
2005	Smallville	Tommy Lee	Episode: "Mortal"
2006	Desolation Canyon	Press Reynolds	Television film
2006	CSI: Crime Scene Investigation	Randy Bolen	Episode: "Time of Your Death"
2006	Aquaman	Sheriff	Unsold pilot
2006	Cold Case	Joseph Shaw	5 episodes
2007–2010	Saving Grace	Detective Ham Dewey	Main cast, 46 episodes
2009–2011	Sons of Anarchy	Herman Kozik	12 episodes
2010	NCIS: Los Angeles	Tommy Boyd	Episode: "Past Lives"
2010	Lie to Me	Malcolm Hessler	Episode: "Pied Piper"
2011–2012	Prime Suspect	Matt Webb	Main cast, 13 episodes
2011	Law & Order: Special Victims Unit	Detective Sean Riggs	Episode: "Dirty"
2011	The Protector	Detective Cummings	Episode: "Help"
2012	The Mentalist	Greg Tayback	Episode: "So Long, and Thanks for All the Red Snapper"
2012	Burn Notice	Tyler Gray	3 episodes
2013	Dexter	U.S. Marshal Max Clayton	3 episodes
2014–2017	Bates Motel	Caleb Calhoun	Main role (season 3), 10 episodes Guest cast, 8 episodes
2014	Castle	Mr. Harden	Episode: "In the Belly of the Beast"
2014	Motive	Doug Slater	Episode: "For You I Die"
2014–2015	Chicago Fire	Tommy Welch	7 episodes
2014	Covert Affairs	James Decker	3 episodes
2016	Secrets and Lies	Danny Voss	Main cast (season 2), 10 episodes
2017–2024	S.W.A.T.	Dominique Luca	Main cast, season 1–6; Guest cast, season 7 (130 episodes)
2023–2024	Mayor of Kingstown	Charlie Pickens	6 episodes
2025	FBI: International	Dean Bartlett	3 episodes
