= Cristian Vega (One Life to Live) =

- One Life to Live character
- David Fumero as Cristian Vega
- Portrayed by: Yorlin Madera (1995–98); David Fumero (1998–2011)
- Duration: 1995–2011
- First appearance: May 3, 1995
- Last appearance: September 8, 2011
- Created by: Michael Malone
- Introduced by: Susan Bedsow Horgan
- Yorlin Madera as Cristian Vega
In-universe information
- Other names: Cristiano Vega
- Occupation: Artist; Boxer; College professor in Spain (2011—); Professor at Llanview University (2008–11); Manager of Capricorn nightclub (2007–11)
- Parents: Diego Vega; Carlotta Vega
- Siblings: Antonio Vega (adoptive)
- Wife: Roseanne Delgado (2000); Natalie Buchanan (2003–05); Vanessa Montez (2008–09)
- Grandparents: Hannah Vega
- Uncles: Manuel Santi
- Nieces: Jamie Vega (adoptive)
- First cousins: Antonio Vega; Tico Santi; Adriana Cramer

Cristian Vega is a fictional character on the American daytime drama One Life to Live. The character was portrayed by Yorlin Madera from 1995 to 1998. David Fumero took over the role from June 26, 1998, until September 8, 2011.

== Casting ==
The role originated and portrayed by Yorlin Madera from May 1995 to January 1998. In June, it was announced the role was recast with David Fumero, who stepped into the role on June 26. In May 2001, it was reported Fumero intended to leave the role; he later re-signed for an addition three years the following month. In September 2003, it was announced Fumero would exit the role; he last appeared on October 27.

In August 2004, it was announced Fumero would reprise the role, beginning November 5, and exited once again in February of the following year. Six months later, it was announced he would again reprise the role; he returned on September 1. In June 2010, it was announced Fumero had signed a deal to continue his portrayal of Cristian.

Following the cancellation of One Life to Live in April 2011, Fumero exited the role on September 8.

== Storylines ==
Cristian is introduced as the teenage son of Carlotta Vega, Dorian Lord's maid and confidante. Cristian's first love is newspaper heiress Jessica Buchanan. It was puppy love at first sight when they first met at a party in Angel Square. Despite their differences and their parents disapproval, Jessica and Cristian continued a relationship. However, everything changed when Will Rappaport and Roseanne Delgado came to town.

After a misunderstanding, Jessica ended up drunk and slept with Will and became pregnant. Cristian proposed to her and they planned to move to New York City to raise the baby together, but when Jessica was hit by a car, she lost the baby and woke up with no memory of Cristian. Cristian was heartbroken, but started to see Roseanne, while Jessica grew closer to Will. Months later, Jessica remembered her love for Cristian and they got back together. However, their happiness was short lived when Jessica discovered that Cristian had slept with Roseanne while they were apart. She ended things with him and started to date Will. Cristian wanted her back and it was clear she still had feelings for him.

When Will was framed by Asa for embezzlement, Jessica, Cristian and Will went on the run together. While on the run, Jessica felt torn between Cristian and Will as she was in love with the both of them. When Todd Manning told Cristian that Jessica's mother, Victoria Lord was dying, Cristian told Will to leave on his own so Jessica would be free to go home. Will agreed and told Jessica that he never loved her. Jessica was heartbroken and turned to Cristian for comfort. The pair reunited and finally had sex for the first time.

Once they arrived back in Llanview, Cristian realized that Viki wasn't dying but he kept the truth of why Will left to himself. Jessica proposed to Cristian and he accepted. As they planned their wedding together, Cristian could tell that Jessica was not over Will and he felt guilty for keeping the truth from her. When Will sent a letter to Jessica, Cristian hid it from her. But ultimately decided to tell her the truth. Jessica was furious with him and she broke off their engagement and left to be with Will. When Jessica returned, she tells him she never got over Will. She tells him that even though she does love him, she can't be with him anymore.

Cristian was heartbroken, but when he met Jennifer Rappaport, she mended his broken heart and they began dating and he fell in love. A year later, he formed a friendship with Natalie Buchanan, Jessica's long-lost twin sister, as he helped her struggle with the fear that she had dissociative identity disorder like her mother. He realized he fell in real love, for the first time, with her and eventually ended his relationship with Jennifer. Cristian proposed to Natalie and she accepted. He disappeared and was presumed dead shortly after his 2003 wedding to Natalie.

A Cristian lookalike with no memory of his past appears in Llanview in 2004, secretly programmed to kill his brother Antonio, who is secretly the eldest son and heir of crime lord Manuel Santi. Carlotta is forced to admit that she is Manuel's sister and that Antonio is Manuel's son with Isabella, taken into Carlotta's care. The attempt to murder Antonio fails as the trauma of trying to kill his own brother brings Cristian's memories flooding back. After killing Manuel's other son Tico and being sent to prison in 2005, Cristian keeps his true identity hidden from his family. In late 2005, Cristian is released from jail when his lawyer Evangeline Williamson proves he had been brainwashed into murdering Tico. Cristian and Evangeline develop a deep friendship; Evangeline is blinded and Cristian is there for her throughout the entire ordeal.

Cristian and Evangeline grow closer and soon start a relationship, eventually declaring their love for one another. At one point Cristian tells Evangeline that he loves her more than anyone else in his life. Cristian is set up by his manager in a boxing scandal, but later cleared of the charges when Vincent Jones confesses. Soon after, Cristian is framed again for multiple cases of arson in Llanview; Evangeline supports his innocence, and the arsons are revealed to be racially motivated crimes by the White supremacist group "One Pure People."

Evangeline's friendship (and kiss) with Todd Manning disrupts her relationship with Cristian and causes them to separate. During this time Cristian sleeps with Todd's ex-wife Blair Cramer, the two of them thinking that Evangeline and Todd are sleeping together at the same time. Cristian and Evangeline are repairing their relationship when, in a final attack by OPP in May 2007, Cristian's loft is filled with poison gas, which injures several people and leaves Evangeline in a coma. Cristian is then forced to say a painful goodbye to Evangeline when she is sent to a long-term care facility with only family allowed visitation.

Still reeling from his loss, Cristian's life is turned upside down again when he, Blair and Rex Balsom stumble upon wayward Buchanan heiress Sarah Roberts during their search for Blair's ex-husband Todd Manning in Chicago. Sarah's boyfriend, Hunter Atwood, had been hired by Miles Laurence to abduct Todd, and Sarah tips Cristian and Blair to his location. As Blair continues to fight to save Todd, Rex and a reluctant Cristian are charged with protecting the spoiled Sarah from Hunter, and Cristian allows Sarah to temporarily become his roommate in his loft. They kiss; Sarah admits to Cristian her feelings for him but Cristian admits he is still in love with Evangeline. Cristian visits Evangeline, telling her that he will always love her and asks her if she wants him to wait for her. Cristian eventually decides it is time to start living again, and asks Sarah out on a date.

In July 2008, Cristian and Sarah are forced over a cliff and Cristian returned to save his adoptive brother after he had been stabbed. The following month, Cristian is put in a Colombian prison by Carlo Hesser. While in Colombia, he meets Vanessa Montez and the two start to connect because she saves his life. Their friendship develops and Cristian moves Vanessa and Lola to Llanview. At the airport, they meet up with Vanessa's ex-husband Ray Montez who was about to leave Llanview to Colombia. A hit man, hired by Dorian Cramer Lord is there to kill Ray but Dorian changes her mind at the last minute and screams to warn John Mcbain who was also there. In the ensuing chaos, Vanessa picks up the hit man's gun and shoots Ray. She is then arrested but Cristian bails her out.

Cristian and Vanessa are married after some advice from family friend Tea Delgado and had sex for the first time. Cristian's girlfriend Sarah Roberts is hurt and upset that Cristian would marry Vanessa and having her be a witness at the wedding. After weeks of holding her tongue, Sarah tells INS that the marriage is a sham and later lashes out at Cristian, telling him that she had loved him and that he couldn't wait long enough to hurt her. She tells him that she is leaving Llanview to be a manager for Puddle Of Mudd. Angry and in tears, she leaves Cristian.

Now that Cristian, Oliver Fish and Layla Williamson are roommates due to a financial situation, Cristian begins to have feelings for Layla, as does Layla for Cristian, though Fish keeps getting in the way of their budding romantic feelings. Cristian begins to get very protective when Layla starts to date Fish again and it's pointed out by Blair and by Tea that he is acting jealous which he denies and insists they are only friends and he's just looking out for her. After witnessing a kiss between Fish and Kyle, Cristian tells Fish he doesn't care if he's homosexual, but to just be honest with Layla. After Fish leaves, Kyle is the next one to point out that Cristian definitely has feelings for Layla. Once Layla figures out the truth about Fish's sexuality, though, she breaks it off with him. But a romantic relationship is non existent between Layla and Cristian at this point because after the messy break up with Fish, she declares she has sworn off of men, leading Cristian to back off, even though there obviously are still mutual romantic feelings between the two. Many weeks later the two share a kiss and Layla admits to wanting it as much as he did; but she also says it can't go any further because she feels like she's betraying Evangeline. Cristian moves out of the apartment and back in with his mom and has been miserable without Layla, his mom notices this and tells Cris to call Layla but he says he won't. Later Layla comes to the diner and they decide to give their relationship a try.

Cristian and Layla's relationship is tested when Jessica is brainwashed by Mitch Laurence into believing she is 17 and still in love with Cristian. During this time, Jessica heavily pursues Cristian. Even though none of her attempts work, it still proves that Cristian still cares about Jessica, which made Layla jealous. After Jessica causes Layla to storm out of the High School Prom, Cristian proposes to Layla, and she accepts. Cris and Layla travel to Maryland to announce their engagement to Layla's mom only to find out that Evangeline is back in the hospital on life support. On July 26, Evangeline is taken off of life support and dies, leaving Cris devastated. Cris later broke up with Layla in February 2011 when he learned that Layla cheated on him with a French photographer after Layla moved to Paris, France for a modeling job.

Cristian became interested in Rama Patel, a married woman whose husband and former Buchanan Enterprises employee Vimal Patel was in jail for taking the fall for Clint for switching the DNA results of Jessica and Natalie's babies. Cristian and Rama kissed a few times but Rama was resistant to taking the relationship to the next level. Cristian was later disgusted to learn that Rama faked being pregnant with Vimal's baby so that she could get her piece of the Buchanan fortune from a deal she made with con artists Aubrey Wentworth and her boyfriend Cutter Wentworth. The two would eventually amicably break up and remain friends with each other even after Vimal was exonerated from prison.

On September 8, 2011, Cristian said good-bye to his family and friends in Llanview after receiving an offer for a teaching job in Barcelona, Spain where, upon arrival, he met the English Poetry teacher, Erin (played by former Jessica portrayer Erin Torpey), commenting on how she reminded him of someone he knew.
