= Eve Brenner =

American actress (born 1925)

- Born: Evelyn Halpern; September 24, 1925 (age 100); New York City, U.S.
- Occupation: Actress
- Years active: 1953–2019
- Television: Baskets (2016–2019); Dragnet (2003–2004); Touched by an Angel (1994–2003)

Eve Brenner (born Evelyn Halpern; born September 24, 1925) is an American retired actress. She appeared in various films and television shows such as Baskets, The Sarah Silverman Program, Dragnet, Touched by an Angel, The X-Files, The Twilight Zone and The Bold and the Beautiful.

== Life and career ==
Brenner was born in New York City, New York on September 24, 1925. She started her career playing Betty (credited using her real name Evelyn Halpern) in a 1953 episode of Adventures of Superman. Her next role was not until 1965 in the film Rat Fink. Years later, she appeared in other television series and films as well as The Twilight Zone (1985–1989), Murder She Wrote (1984–1996), The Bold and the Beautiful (1987), The X-Files (1993–2018), Touched by an Angel (1994–2003), The McCarthys (2014–2015) and Baskets (2016–2019). She voiced The Mouse Queen in Disney animated film The Great Mouse Detective (1986). Brenner turned 100 in September 2025.

== Filmography ==
Films
Year	Title	Role	Note
1965	Rat Fink	Mrs. Dunkirk	
1977	March or Die	Singing Girl	
1986	Torment	Mrs. Courtland	
1986	The Great Mouse Detective	The Mouse Queen	Voice
1991	Strays	Old Woman	
1995	Murder in the First	Withrop's Secretary	
1996	The Rockford Files: Godfather Knows Best	Corky	
1997	The Second Civil War	Elderly Militia Woman	
1997	On the Line	Homeless Woman	
2000	Finding Kelly	Dorothy Hollings	
2001	See Jane Run	Starlet	
2001	Thank Heaven	Old Lady	
2002	Monkey Love	Uncle Vid	
2002	Today I Vote for My Joey	Sadie	Supporting
2009	Play the Game	Maxine Polacheck	Supporting
2012	Stand Up Guys	Anita	Supporting
2014	Walk of Shame	Old Lady	
2018	I'll Be Next Door for Christmas	Gramma	Supporting
2019	South of Heaven: Episode 1- Little Sister	Mabel	Supporting

Television
Year	Title	Role	Note
1953	Adventures of Superman	Betty	1 episode
1985	George Burns Comedy Week		
1985	Hollywood Beat	Elderly Lady	
1985–1989	The Twilight Zone	Old Woman, Neighbor 1	
1987	Highway to Heaven	Etta	
1987	Me & Mrs. C.	Angela	
1988	Hunter	Lady	
1989	Murder, She Wrote	Irina	Supporting
1989–1992	McGee and Me!	Grandma Martin	Supporting
1990	Quantum Leap	Madeline	
1991	The New Adam-12	Gloria	
1991	The Bold and the Beautiful	Mary, Homeless Woman	Supporting
1991	Parker Lewis Can't Lose	Housewife	
1992	Star Trek: The Next Generation	Inad	
1993	Doogie Howser, M.D.	Irma Claybourne	
1994	Murphy Brown	Norwegian Woman	
1994	Baywatch	Diana Sutherland	
1994-2000	Chicago Hope	Mrs. Gallagher, Patient	
1995	Dr. Quinn, Medicine Woman	Sam Lindsay	Supporting
1995	Sisters	Aunt Gigi	Supporting
1996	Star Trek: Voyager	Jora Mirell	
1996	Profilier	Julie Rafer	
1997	Spy Game	Lab Woman	
1997	Early Edition	Eve	
1997	The Visitor	Hospital Administrator	
1998	Beyond Belief: Fact or Fiction	Edith Waterson	Supporting
1998	Seinfield	Lady in Restaurant	Uncredited
1999	Silk Stalkings	Florence	
1999	Poltergeist: The Legacy	Grethchen Dunworth	
1999	Popular	Nana Julian	
2000	Ally McBeal	Old Ally	
2000	Good vs. Evil	Elderly Neighbor	
2000	Ann Day Now	Norma Jean Rayfield	
2000	Just Shoot Me!	Lillian	Supporting
2000	The X-Files	Mrs. McKesson	Supporting
2001	Touched by an Angel	Florence Gibbons	Supporting
2001	The Practice	Sybil Waters	
2003	ER	Wilma	
2003	Luis	Mrs. Gallagher	
2003	According to Jim	Old Lady Meier	
2004	Blue Collar TV		
2004	Dead Like Me	Rosie	
2004	Dragnet	Mrs. Kutler	Supporting
2005	Twins	Ruth	
2006	Cold Case	Johanna Hoffman	
2006	The Unit	Rose	Uncredited
2007	The Sarah Silverman Program	Mrs. Ramstack	Supporting
2010	I'm in the Band	Grandma Nana	Supporting
2010	Rizzoli & Isles	Mrs. Jones	
2010	The Mentalist	Biltmore Nicki	
2012	The League	Wanda	
2014	The McCarthys	Great Aunt Lucy	
2015	Modern Family	Ander's Mother	
2016–2019	Baskets	Martha's Mom, Mrs. Brooks	Supporting
2016	Grey's Anatomy	Enid	Supporting
2017	The Middle	Mrs. Perkins	
2019	The Rookie	Ruth	Supporting
2019	Magnum P.I.	Helen	

== See also ==
- List of centenarians (actors, filmmakers and entertainers)
