= John Penney =

American film director

- Born: United States
- Occupations: Screenwriter, producer, director
- Notable work: Return of the Living Dead III
- Parent: Raylyn Moore (father)
- Relatives: Ward Moore (stepfather)

John Penney is an American film producer, screenwriter and director who has been working in the horror genre for over thirty years. He has created material for, and been involved in, a range of subgenres, including zombie movies (Return of the Living Dead III), classic Creature Features (Amphibious), and supernatural thrillers (Hellgate).

== Biography ==
John Penney is the son of science fiction writer Raylyn Moore (née Crabbe) and stepson of writer Ward Moore. Ray Bradbury was an old roommate of Ward Moore, and one of the first people to give Penney writing advice when he was a young man.

Penney attended UCLA where he studied film and received a degree in English.

Penney's first literary agent was H.N. Swanson, the man who represented F. Scott Fitzgerald, Raymond Chandler, William Faulkner and many other giants of 20th century literature.

== Career ==
Penney started his career as a film editor, with his first job being an assistant editor on The Dorm That Dripped Blood, a film that became embroiled in the infamous Video Nasties case, after it was banned in the UK. He went on to work on several independent horror productions, including The Power (1984), as well as Dan O'Bannon's The Return of the Living Dead. It was shortly after this that Penney wrote the screenplay for The Kindred (1987), the process of which made him want to become a full-time writer. It was on The Kindred that Penney worked with Psycho screenwriter Joseph Stefano. Afterwards he joined the Screenwriting Guild and sold a script to Warner Brothers. This led to working on several projects within the studio system which did not come to fruition.

The independent filmmaker Brian Yuzna was in the process of developing a sequel to The Return of the Living Dead and Penney pitched and idea which he describes as "Romeo and Juliet on the run". Yuzna was impressed and they began developing the script, with Penney bringing beat sheets to Yuzna's office every day. The film was released through Trimark Pictures and went on to become a cult classic. The central theme of zombie as main character was new at the time, and has since been utilized by such contemporary films as Warm Bodies (2013) and Life After Beth (2014).

During the 1990s and early 2000s, as well as his horror genre work, Penney wrote for television and mainstream movies.

In addition to his screenplays, Penney has written short stories that have won him an award from the Adelphi Academy in New York, and have been published in the Magazine of Fantasy and Science Fiction.

Zyzzyx Road became part of a media frenzy when a screening (held for obligatory contractual purposes to secure an international release) was filed at the box office leading to the film becoming known as the "lowest grossing film of all time" by only making $20USD following a two ticket refund reducing the original total from $30USD for a budget of $1.2 Million. Subsequent media sales ($368,000 as of 2006) & zero reporting of global box office return cemented this as liable to be true on a global box office scale.

In 2011 Penney wrote and directed the supernatural thriller Hellgate. The film was shot in Thailand and stars Hurt and Cary Elwes. It was awarded the 2011 Best Film at the Bram Stoker International Film Festival in England as well as winning Best Horror Film at the 2011 Fantasy Horror Awards in Italy.

Penney's first novel, Truck Stop, was released in 2012.

An interview with Penney was published in the October 2013 issue of Fangoria Magazine. The piece, written by Colin McCracken, was a celebration of the 20th Anniversary of Return of the Living Dead III.

== Filmography ==
Year	Title	Director	Writer
1984	The Power	No	Story
1987	The Kindred	No	Yes
1993	Return of the Living Dead III	No	Yes
1996	Past Perfect	No	Yes
1998	Legend Of The Mummy	No	Adaptation
1998	Perfect Assassins	No	Yes
1998	Matter Of Trust	No	Yes
2000	Contaminated Man	No	Yes
2000	In Pursuit	No	Yes
2001	The Enemy	No	Yes
2006	Zyzzyx Road	Yes	Yes
2010	Magic	No	Yes
2010	Amphibious	No	Yes
2011	Hellgate	Yes	Yes

== Bibliography ==
- Killing Time (2012)
- Truck Stop (2012)
