= Jeffrey Obrow =

American film director

Jeffrey Obrow is an American film director and a professor at USC School of Cinematic Arts. He has also produced many music videos with Propaganda Films.

== Career ==
Obrow's first project, The Dorm That Dripped Blood, was written & directed by Stephen Carpenter, who shot the film as his undergraduate project thesis at UCLA. Carpenter brought Obrow in as a producer and co-director.

== Filmography ==
- The Dorm That Dripped Blood (1982)
- The Power (1984)
- The Kindred (1987)
- Servants of Twilight (1991)
- Bram Stoker's Legend of the Mummy (1998)
- They Are Among Us (2004)
