= Zyzzyx Road =

2006 American thriller film by John Penney

- Theatrical release poster
- Directed by: John Penney
- Written by: John Penney
- Produced by: John Penney
- Starring: Katherine Heigl; Leo Grillo; Tom Sizemore
- Cinematography: David Klein
- Edited by: Joseph Gutowski
- Music by: Ryan Beveridge
- Production company: Zyzzyx LLC
- Distributed by: GoDigital Media Group
- Release date: February 25, 2006
- Running time: 86 minutes
- Country: United States
- Language: English
- Budget: $1.2 million
- Box office: $30

Zyzzyx Road (/ˈzɪzɪks/ ZIZ-iks), also called Zyzzyx Rd., is a 2006 American thriller film written, produced and directed by John Penney and starring Katherine Heigl, Leo Grillo, and Tom Sizemore.

The film gained notoriety from its gross ticket sales of only $30 on its opening run during its intentionally limited release at a single cinema; it is the lowest-grossing film in U.S. history in terms of box office sales. It also was the film that grossed the lowest opening box office sales, until The Worst Movie Ever! (2011), which ended up with just $11 during its premiere.

== Plot synopsis ==
Grant, a philandering accountant, goes to Las Vegas on a business trip and encounters a seductress, Marissa, and her jealous ex-boyfriend Joey. Joey attacks them and Grant and Marissa incapacitate Joey. Believing they have killed him, they decide to bury him along the eponymous Zyzzyx Road, a rural road off Interstate 15 in California's Mojave Desert (though there is a slight spelling difference between the actual Zzyzx Road and the road in the movie). We see Grant has a bump on his head and is hallucinating. After digging a grave, Grant and Marissa return to find Joey missing from the trunk of Grant's car. Grant chases Joey through the desert with a shovel, and when he finds him hidden in an abandoned mine, Joey tells Grant he wasn't trying to kill Grant, he was trying to kill Marissa because she's actually a succubus. However, that is revealed to be a hallucination as well.

== Cast ==
- Leo Grillo as Grant, an accountant who begins an affair with Marissa
- Katherine Heigl as Marissa, Grant's lover and Joey's ex-girlfriend. John Penney gambled on Heigl's rising success in Grey's Anatomy to boost sales. Thora Birch was initially offered the role, but she turned it down.
- Tom Sizemore as Joey, Marissa's jealous ex-boyfriend. Grillo "was drawn to his acting chops, and Sizemore's past actually made him more convincing as a tough-guy villain." Several actors, including Jason Lee, turned down the role before Sizemore was cast.
- Yorlin Madera as Truck Driver Bob
- Nancy Linari (voice) as Brenda

== Production ==
Principal photography was in the summer of 2005 and lasted 18 days, plus an additional two days for pickup scenes. The film was shot entirely on location in the Mojave Desert, in and around local mines. Sizemore and longtime friend Peter Walton, who worked as Sizemore's assistant, were arrested during the film's production for repeatedly failing drug tests while on probation. Sizemore was allowed to resume filming his scenes.

== Release and box office gross ==
From February 25 to March 2, 2006, Zyzzyx Road was shown once a day, at noon, at the Highland Park Village Theater in Dallas, Texas, in one auditorium rented by the producers for $1,000. The limited release was deliberate: Grillo was uninterested in releasing the film domestically until it underwent foreign distribution, but the film needed to fulfill the U.S. release obligation required by the Screen Actors Guild for low-budget films (those with budgets less than $2.5 million that are not for the direct-to-video market).

The strategy had the side effect of making it, at the time, the lowest-grossing film in history; it earned just $30 at the box office, from six patrons paying $5 each for admission. Unofficially, its opening weekend netted $20, with the $10 difference due to Grillo personally refunding two tickets purchased by Sheila Moore, the film's makeup artist, who saw the film with a friend.

The similarly-named film Zzyzx has mistakenly been cited as the lowest-grossing of all time instead, due to the two films' similar titles and release in the same month.

== Home media ==
Zyzzyx Road was released on DVD in 23 countries, including Bulgaria, Indonesia, and Portugal. By the end of 2006, it had earned around $368,000. In the summer of 2012, six years after its original release, GoDigital released the film domestically in digital format because of its better performance internationally. It was released on DVD in North America in September 2010. In November 2024, the film was released on Ultra HD Blu-ray under MVD Entertainment Group.
