= Leo Grillo =

American actor (born 1948)

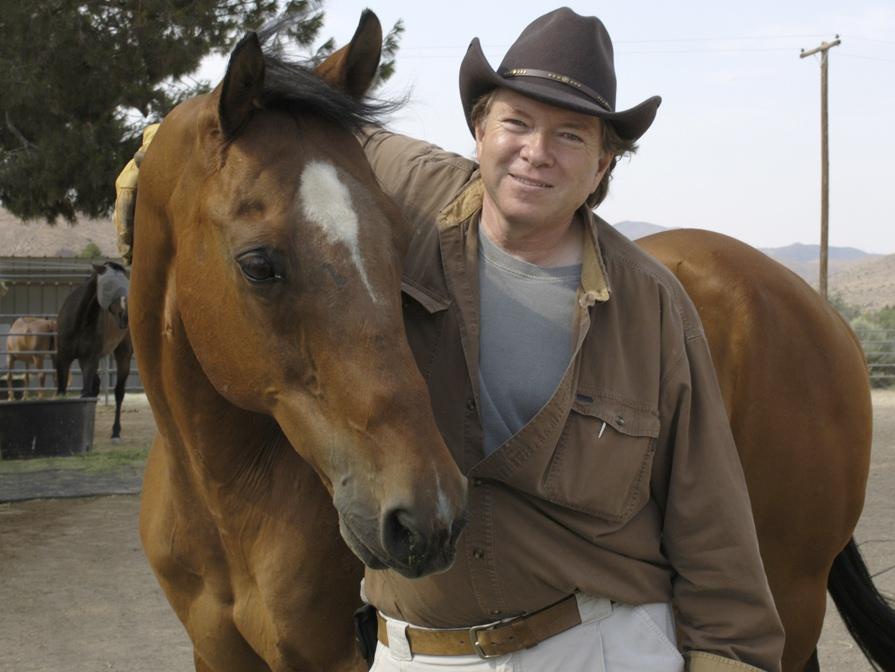
- Leo Grillo with Willy, a rescued horse
- Born: Leo Francis Grillo, Jr. 1949 (age 76–77); Lawrence, Massachusetts, US
- Occupations: Actor, producer, activist
- Years active: 1972–present

Leo Francis Grillo Jr. (born 1948) is an American film actor, producer, and animal welfare activist. He is best known for founding Dedication and Everlasting Love to Animals Rescue, an animal welfare organization based in Acton, California. The not-for-profit organization was incorporated in 1981.

In 2024, D.E.L.T.A. Rescue lost a multi-million dollar judgment in a civil case for workplace discrimination, leading to its filing for Chapter 11 bankruptcy in 2025. In March 2026, the Federal Bureau of Investigation arrested and accused Grillo for an alleged plot to kidnap the plaintiff in the civil case. Grillo plead "not guilty" to the charges. He was remanded, and his subsequent request for bail was denied. As of July 2026 Grillo is detained in the Metropolitan Detention Center, Los Angeles.

== Early life ==
Grillo was born in Lawrence, Massachusetts, to Carmela de Lucia and Leo Francis Grillo, Sr., both Italian-Americans. Grillo appeared in the 1972 television series Banacek. Grillo majored in theatre at Emerson College in Boston, MA.

== Career ==
In 1977, Grillo moved from Boston to Los Angeles, California, to pursue a film career. He appeared in the 1977 John Heard film Between the Lines. Grillo studied under the tutelage of Charles E. Conrad, an acting coach credited with launching the film careers of Dee Wallace and Diana Ross, both Academy Award nominees.

Grillo was the lead actor in Dierdre's Party, a feature film he produced in 1998. Grillo played lead actor, opposite Katherine Heigl, in the 2006 independent film Zyzzyx Road. In 2009, Grillo co-wrote, produced and starred in Magic, opposite Sammi Hanratty, Lori Heuring, Christopher Lloyd and Robert Davi, who directed the movie.

== Animal advocacy and shelter ==
Grillo and his staff of seventy care for more than 1,500 previously abandoned and abused animals on a daily basis at the D.E.L.T.A. Rescue sanctuary in Glendale, California. According to tax documents, Grillo takes no salary to run the 150-acre No-Kill refuge. Grillo founded Horse Rescue of America in 1988.

In 2008, Grillo created "Animals on the Edge," a global project that allows animals from other nations to benefit from Grillo's initiatives. Grillo co-conceived with wildlife photographer and author Chris Weston a book by the same name. The book identifies those animals currently living on the frontline of extinction.

== Discrimination lawsuit and alleged kidnapping conspiracy ==
In 2024 a Los Angeles court ruled against D.E.L.T.A. Rescue in a wrongful dismissal and employment discrimination case. In a deposition Grillo made a number of statements referring to the plaintiff as a “lettuce picker” and a “bimbo” and making statements such as “I don’t speak Mexican.” D.E.L.T.A. Rescue was unsuccessful in suppressing the statements from the trial evidence. The court assessed $6.7 million in damages to the plaintiff. In 2025, D.E.L.T.A. Rescue filed for Chapter 11 bankruptcy protection as it contested the ruling.

In March 2026, Leo Grillo was arrested and accused by the Federal Bureau of Investigation of paying for the kidnapping of the plaintiff in the civil case to avoid paying her. Grillo plead "not guilty" to the charges. He was remanded, and his subsequent request for bail was denied. As of July 2026 Grillo is detained in the Metropolitan Detention Center, Los Angeles.

With Grillo jailed, the bankruptcy court in June 2026 approved a compromise settlement between D.E.L.T.A. Rescue's court-appointed trustee and former employee paying her $5.6 million.

In October 2026, a status report by D.E.L.T.A. Rescue's trustee reported that while the organization's board has requested the dismissal of the bankruptcy case, the California Attorney General has requested "an investigation of pre-petition activities by the Debtor’s board members and officers". The trustee also stated that "any future management of the Debtor should not involve or include Leo Grillo".

As of November 2, 2026, Grillo's name, biography and image remain prominently displayed on the website of D.E.L.T.A. Rescue.

== Family ==
Grillo is the father of Meguire Elizabeth Grillo and Erica Lee Grillo.

== Filmography ==
=== Actor ===
- Magic (2010) (film) – Brad Fairmont
- Zyzzyx Rd (2006) (film) – Grant
- Deirdre's Party (1998) (film) – Leonard
- The Defection of Simas Kudirka (TV) (1978) – Thomas
- Between the Lines (1977) (TV) – Car Owner
- Banacek (1972) (TV) – Mat
- Detour to Nowhere (1972) (TV) – Mat

=== Self ===
- Your Mommy Kills Animals (2007) (documentary)
- Cats: Caressing the Tiger (1991) (National Geographic)

=== Producer ===
- Magic (2010) (film) – executive producer
- Zyzzyx Rd (2006) (film) – executive producer
- The Rescuer (2005) – executive producer
- Deirdre's Party (1998) – executive producer

=== Writer ===
- Magic (2009) (film)
