= Stephen Carpenter (writer) =

American novelist

- Born: Weatherford, Texas, U.S.
- Education: University of California, Los Angeles
- Occupations: Writer; film director; cinematographer
- Known for: Grimm

Stephen Carpenter, born in Weatherford, Texas, and raised in Kansas City, Missouri, is an American writer, director, and cinematographer.

== Career ==
His screenplays include The Man starring Samuel L. Jackson and Eugene Levy, Blue Streak starring Martin Lawrence, and others. He has written and directed several thrillers, including Soul Survivors starring Eliza Dushku and Casey Affleck.

In 2011, he created the NBC fantasy police procedural drama television series Grimm, which premiered in the 2011 fall season. It aired to March 31, 2017, for 123 episodes, running for over six seasons. Grimm was originally developed for CBS, but did not end up moving forward due to the 2007–08 writers' strike. In January 2011, the series moved to NBC. It has been described as "a cop drama—with a twist ... a dark and fantastical project about a world in which characters inspired by Grimms' Fairy Tales exist", though the stories and characters inspiring the show are also drawn from other sources.

Carpenter's first novel, Killer, published in 2010 on Amazon Kindle was No. 1 on Amazon's Mystery/Thriller lists, and was characterized as "a blockbuster debut" by Entertainment Weekly. His latest book, Killer in the Hills, was published by Amazon in December 2011. As of December 2011, he was developing a one-hour mystery series for NBC.

He is currently working on several Kindle Vella series, Killer be Killed and The Grimm Curse.

== Personal life ==
Carpenter has been writing since 7th grade. He graduated from the University of California, Los Angeles School of Theater, Film and Television. He lectures on writing and story structure at the University of Southern California's School of Cinematic Arts.
