= Ronnie Scribner =

American actor

- Born: Ronald Adam Scribner; July 23, 1966 (age 60); U.S.A.
- Occupation: Actor
- Years active: 1977–1982

Ronnie Scribner (born July 23, 1966) is an American former actor. Beginning his career as a professional child actor and model at the age of 11, Scribner is perhaps best known for his role as the child vampire Ralphie Glick in the 1979 CBS mini-series Salem's Lot. Rising to prominence among teenage audiences as an adolescent, he is also known for his multiple guest-starring roles throughout the late 1970s and early 1980s on such television series as the ABC Afterschool Special, Little House on the Prairie, The Love Boat, Fantasy Island, CHiPs, and Dallas, among others.

== Early life ==
Ronnie Scribner was born Ronald Adam Scribner on July 23, 1966, to parents Penny and Lawrence Scribner. He has one younger sibling, a sister named Annaliesa (born in 1969), who was also a child actor, appearing in numerous commercials as well as guest-starring with him in an episode of Little House on the Prairie. With his youthful "boy-next-door" looks and small for his age, Scribner was often cast in roles several years younger than his true age throughout most of his career as a child star.

== Career ==
=== Early career ===
Scribner began his acting career at the age of 11 when he landed his first television role as a recurring character on the 1977/1978 season of General Hospital. On September 16, 1978, he appeared in his first starring role on ABC's Saturday morning anthology series The ABC Weekend Special. In the episode entitled "The Contest Kid and the Big Prize", Scribner starred as Woody, the best friend of Harvey, played by fellow child star Patrick Petersen, who wins a "gentleman's gentleman" after entering a magazine contest. That same evening, Scribner made his prime-time debut on the ABC series Fantasy Island. In the episode entitled "The Homecoming", Scribner guest-starred as Danny, the son of a Vietnam veteran (David Birney) whose wish is to be reunited with his wife and son after recovering from eight years of amnesia. On October 11, 1978, Scribner appeared in his first leading role in an episode of The ABC Afterschool Special, the popular children's anthology series much like The ABC Weekend Special, but known for its more mature and often dramatic stories. In the episode entitled "A Home Run for Love" (also known as "Thank You, Jackie Robinson"), Scribner starred as Sammy Greene, a fatherless boy who forms a special bond with an elderly friend through their mutual love of the 1947 Brooklyn Dodgers.

On January 15, 1979, Scribner made his first guest-starring appearance on the NBC series Little House on the Prairie. In the episode entitled "Blind Man's Bluff", Scribner played Jordan Harrison, a friend of Laura Ingalls (Melissa Gilbert) who pretends to be blind after an accident in order to bring his quarreling parents closer together. Credited as "Lisa Scribner", Scribner's younger sister Annaliese also had a small role in the same episode as Hannah Herzog, a young girl attending Mary's (Melissa Sue Anderson) school for the blind. Scribner's next role was in the NBC television movie The Castaways on Gilligan's Island. Premiering on May 3, 1979, the movie was the second film adaptation reuniting the original cast of the 1960s sitcom Gilligan's Island. In the movie, Scribner played Robbie Sloan, a runaway boy who hides on the island after the former castaways have turned it into a luxury vacation destination. On September 9, 1979, Scribner once again returned as a guest star on Fantasy Island. In the episode's storyline entitled "Hit Man", Scribner portrayed Greg Forbush, the son of a desperate businessman (David Doyle) whose wish is to be killed so that his family can collect on his life insurance. Complete with an entirely different family, Scribner joined the list of Fantasy Island guest stars who would return to the show to play a completely different character than his previous appearance. Scribner's next appearance was a reprisal of his role as Woody on The ABC Weekend Special, once again starring alongside Patrick Petersen as Harvey. Airing on September 22, 1979, and titled "The Contest Kid Strikes Again", it was one of the rare times ABC produced a sequel episode to one of their live-action Weekend Special stories. On November 2, 1979, Scribner guest-starred on the CBS prime-time soap opera, Dallas. In the episode entitled "The Lost Child", Scribner played Luke Middens, a lonely young boy who develops a special relationship with Bobby Ewing (Patrick Duffy), after his father is hired as a ranch hand at Southfork.

=== Salem's Lot ===
The moments when Salem's Lot's Glick brothers, with their ghastly pale faces, eyes burning with an intelligence deeply rooted in something both evil and ancient, float outside the window tapping on the glass and whispering, 'Let me in,' are among the most captivatingly sinister sequences ever put to film.

— Lee Gambin

On November 17, 1979, Scribner starred in what would become his most famous role, that of the child vampire Ralphie Glick in the two-part CBS television movie Salem's Lot. Based on the Stephen King novel and shot on film, the mini-series was later re-edited and given a feature film theatrical release in some European countries. In one of the film's most memorable scenes, Scribner's character levitates in the mist outside his brother's bedroom window, one of the first depictions of the child vampire in film, and becoming something of a cinematic touchstone among horror fans. In 1993, Scribner's haunting window scene was parodied in one of the special "Treehouse of Horror" episodes of The Simpsons. In the segment entitled "Bart Simpson's Dracula", Bart is turned into a vampire by Mr. Burns, and later comes for his sister Lisa by floating outside her bedroom window and scraping on the glass. In 2003, Scribner's window scene was ranked #42 on Channel 4's list of "The 100 Greatest Scary Moments". In the countdown special, screenwriter-producer Mark Gatiss said of Scribner's scene - "It's just straight-forward scares. You can't really work out how he's floating. He's got this ghastly, deathly palette; it was really wonderful." In 2008, Scribner's scene was ranked #4 on Empire magazine's list of "Top 10 Scariest Movie Scenes". For the list, horror writer-director James Gunn wrote of Scribner's performance - "The moment with the little vampire brother knocking on the window, scraping and making that horrible sound. And his brother comes over and lets him in! When I was a kid, that scared me more than anything else in my entire life. It gave me nightmares for years. It all comes down to that little kid's performance! The smile on his face is the scariest, creepiest thing of all time." In 2012, Fangoria writer Lee Gambin described the enduring iconography of Scribner's role as "a beautiful play on the Peter Pan mythology where the children of darkness never grow up, staying young forever by feeding on the blood of mortals," and lauded Scribner's scenes as "among the most captivatingly sinister sequences ever put to film." When interviewed about the cult following the film, and particularly his scenes, had sustained for more than 30 years, Scribner stated, "It was the most fun, and I'm super happy to have been a part of something that means so much to people."

=== Later career ===
On March 15, 1980, Scribner had a guest-starring role on the ABC series The Love Boat. In the episode's storyline entitled "Tres Amigos", Scribner played Keith Gaines, a boy who befriends Vicki (Jill Whelan) while the two try to hide a young stowaway (Tony Ramirez) on his way to Mexico to visit his mother. On April 5, 1980, Scribner next guest-starred on the short-lived NBC sitcom Me and Maxx in the episode entitled "Maxx's Friend". As indicated by the episode's title, Scribner played Terry, a new friend who causes anxiety for Norman (Joe Santos) when he spends the night as a sleepover guest of the series' young female titular character, Maxx (Melissa Michaelsen). Scribner's next role was in the first of The Gambler television films. Premiering on April 8, 1980, Scribner originated the role of Jeremiah Hawkes (later played by Charles Fields and Kris Kamm in subsequent film installments), the long-lost son of a gambler (Kenny Rogers) who seeks out his father after learning of his true identity. On May 23, 1980, Scribner played the starring role in the ABC made-for-television movie The Long Days of Summer. In the allegorical coming-of-age story, Scribner played Daniel Cooper, a Jewish boy who prepares to fight a bully when his family faces antisemitism in 1938 Bridgeport, Connecticut. On July 20, 1980, Scribner guest-starred on another short-lived ABC comedy When the Whistle Blows. In the episode entitled "Run For The Roses", Scribner played Scott, a young jockey-in-training who befriends a construction worker named Hunk (Tim Rossovich) after Hunk wins a broken-down thoroughbred race horse in a raffle. Scribner's next guest-starring role was on the NBC series CHiPs. In the two-hour episode airing on December 7, 1980, and titled "The Great 5k Star Race and Boulder Wrap Party", Scribner played Dane, a boy who wants Jon (Larry Wilcox) for his "Big Brother" after Jon rescues him from a bicycle accident. Although most online sources indicate that the episode aired as a two-hour episode, the special was subsequently aired as two separate one-hour episodes for syndication.

On March 20, 1981, Scribner had a co-starring role in the Disney feature film Amy. Originally intended to air as part of the Wonderful World of Disney television anthology series, the film was instead given a theatrical release. In the film, Scribner portrayed Walter Ray, a blind boy attending a special school for the deaf and blind in the early 1900s when a new teacher, Amy (Jenny Agutter), comes to begin a new life. Scribner's next appearance was a guest-starring role on the ABC family drama Code Red produced by Irwin Allen. In the episode entitled "All That Glitters" (listed by some sources as "The Land of Make Believe") and airing on November 29, 1981, Scribner played Seth, a boy who befriends Danny (Adam Rich), a young firefighter-in-training who lands a small role in a film where the flagrant fire code violations endanger everyone working on set. On December 9, 1981, Scribner next guest-starred on the NBC mystery-crime series Quincy, M.E.. In the episode entitled "For Want of a Horse", Scribner portrayed Gabe, a young mute ranch hand who holds the key to a murder that Quincy (Jack Klugman) is investigating.

=== Teen idol ===
As Scribner entered adolescence, teenage audiences began to take notice of him, as did the teen magazines. Beginning to appear his true age, Scribner made the transition from child star to teen idol with color pinups and articles appearing in numerous teen magazines of the time, including Tiger Beat, Super Teen and Teen Stars among others. In April 1982, Tiger Beat described Scribner when introducing him to their teen readers - "Soft brown hair, sparkling eyes of blue, a touch of freckles that gives him that appealing boy-next-door look and a smile to make your heart spin - that's Ronnie Scribner." On October 3, 1982, Scribner returned to the big screen with a role in the feature film Split Image. In the film, Scribner portrayed Sean Stetson, the adolescent brother of a young man (Michael O'Keefe) whose family struggles to bring him home after he joins a religious "commune". Although a small supporting role, Scribner's performance in the film earned him a Youth In Film Award nomination (now known as the Young Artist Award) in the "Best Young Supporting Actor in a Motion Picture" category. On October 18, 1982, Scribner returned to Little House on the Prairie in what would be his final role. In the episode entitled "Rage", Scribner guest-starred as Randall Page, a teenage boy in Walnut Grove who falls in love with a girl (Tammy Lauren) whose father, plagued by personal and financial troubles, becomes unhinged after learning of the young lovers' budding romance.

== Personal life ==
Following his final appearance on Little House, Scribner's acting career began to taper off. In 1985, he was reportedly set to co-star in the feature film The Falcon and the Snowman, but his role was subsequently cut from the final edit and interest from the teen magazines eventually waned. After leaving show business, Scribner finished high school, and in 1989 enrolled at the University of California, where he graduated in 1993. In the subsequent years, Scribner worked as a financial analyst and mortgage broker, and in 1999, he married Jessica Garza. As of 2011, Scribner was working as a consumer credit manager and was living in the Denver, Colorado, area with his wife, Jessica, and their three children.

== Filmography ==
Film
Year	Film	Role	Notes
1979	Salem's Lot	Ralphie Glick	112 minute theatrical version
1981	Amy	Walter Ray	
1982	Split Image	Sean Stetson	
Television film
Year	Film	Role	Notes
1979	The Castaways on Gilligan's Island	Robbie Sloan	
1979	Salem's Lot	Ralphie Glick	184 minute television version
1980	The Gambler	Jeremiah Hawkes	
1980	The Long Days of Summer	Daniel Cooper	
Television
Year	Film	Role	Notes
1977–1978	General Hospital	?	Recurring role
1978	ABC Weekend Special	Woody	Episode: "The Contest Kid and the Big Prize"
1978	Fantasy Island	Danny Harding	Episode: "The Sheikh/The Homecoming"
1978	ABC Afterschool Special	Sammy Greene	Episode: "A Home Run For Love"
1979	Little House on the Prairie	Jordan Harrison	Episode: "Blind Man's Bluff"
1979	Fantasy Island	Greg Forbush	Episode: "Hit Man/The Swimmer"
1979	ABC Weekend Special	Woody	Episode: "The Contest Kid Strikes Again"
1979	Big Shamus, Little Shamus	Paulie	Episode: "Pilot" (Unaired)
1979	Dallas	Luke Middens	Episode: "The Lost Child"
1980	The Love Boat	Keith	Episode: "Dumb Luck/Tres Amigos/Hey, Jealous Lover"
1980	Me and Maxx	Terry	Episode: "Maxx's Friend"
1980	When the Whistle Blows	Scott	Episode: "Run for the Roses"
1980	CHiPs	Dane	Episode: "The Great 5k Star Race and Boulder Wrap Party - Parts 1 & 2"
1981	Code Red	Seth	Episode: "All That Glitters" (aka: "The Land of Make Believe")
1981	Quincy, M.E.	Gabe	Episode: "For Want of a Horse"
1982	Little House on the Prairie	Randall Page	Episode: "Rage"

== Awards ==
Year	Award	Category	Project	Result	Ref.
1981—1982	Youth in Film Award (now known as the Young Artist Award)	Best Young Supporting Actor in a Motion Picture	Split Image	Nominated	

== Bibliography ==
- Holmstrom, John. The Moving Picture Boy: An International Encyclopaedia from 1895 to 1995. Norwich, Michael Russell, 1996, p. 360-361.
