= Noble Willingham =

American actor (1931–2004)

- Born: Noble Henry Willingham, Jr. August 31, 1931; Mineola, Texas, U.S.
- Died: January 17, 2004 (aged 72); Palm Springs, California, U.S.
- Resting place: Riverside National Cemetery
- Education: North Texas State College; Baylor University
- Occupation: Actor
- Years active: 1970–2003
- Political party: Republican
- Spouses: Doris Jewel Humphreys (m. 1954; died 1988) Patti Ross Willingham (m. 2000)
- Children: 3

Noble Henry Willingham, Jr. (August 31, 1931 – January 17, 2004) was an American actor who appeared in more than thirty films and in many television shows, including a stint opposite Chuck Norris in Walker, Texas Ranger.

== Early life ==
Willingham was the son of railroad worker and farmer Noble Henry Willingham, Sr, and Ruby Ladelle (née Speights).

He was born in the small town of Mineola, in Wood County east of Dallas, Texas. After graduating in 1953 from North Texas State College in Denton, he earned a master's degree in educational psychology from Baylor University in Waco, Texas. Willingham served in the United States Army during the Korean War

== Career ==
Willingham taught government and economics at Sam Houston High School in Houston before he followed his dream of becoming an actor. He auditioned for a part in The Last Picture Show (1971), which was filmed in Texas. He won the role, which led to another appearance, in Paper Moon (1973).

Willingham appeared in more than thirty feature films, including Chinatown (1974); Aloha, Bobby and Rose (1975); Sheila Levine Is Dead and Living in New York (1975); Greased Lightning (1977); The Boys in Company C (1978); Norma Rae (1979); Brubaker (1980); The Howling (1981); La Bamba (1987); Good Morning, Vietnam (1987); City Slickers (1991); The Last Boy Scout (1991); Of Mice and Men (1992); Fire in the Sky (1993); The Hudsucker Proxy (1994); Ace Ventura: Pet Detective (1994); and City Slickers II: The Legend of Curly's Gold (1994).

On television, Willingham had a recurring role in the ABC series Home Improvement with Tim Allen as John Binford, and appeared as a guest star in the 1975 CBS family drama series Three for the Road. He also guest starred on Dallas; The A-Team; Murder, She Wrote; Star Trek: The Next Generation (1989); Northern Exposure; The Rockford Files; Tucker's Witch with Tim Matheson and Catherine Hicks; and Quantum Leap. His additional television credits include A Woman With a Past, The Children Nobody Wanted, The Alamo: Thirteen Days to Glory, and Unconquered. He also played the conductor in Kenny Rogers as The Gambler (1980), Dr. Graham in Living Proof: The Hank Williams Jr. Story (1983), he appeared in the 1986 miniseries Dream West, and appeared in Badge of the Assassin (1985) and Men Don't Tell (1993). He guest starred as IRS Agent Bumpers in the show Remington Steele.

He was best known for his role as C.D. Parker on the series Walker, Texas Ranger from 1993 to 1999. He left the show to run for the United States House of Representatives. He ran for the Texas's 1st congressional district seat against incumbent Max Sandlin, who beat Willingham handily.

== Filmography ==
=== Film ===
Year	Title	Role	Notes
1971	The Last Picture Show	Chester	
1973	The Thief Who Came to Dinner	Roy	Uncredited
1973	Paper Moon	Mr. Robertson	
1973	Hit!	Warden Springer	
1974	Chinatown	Councilman #1	
1974	Big Bad Mama	Uncle Barney	
1974	Where Have All the People Gone?	Jim Clancey	
1975	Aloha, Bobby and Rose	Uncle Charlie	
1975	Sheila Levine Is Dead and Living in New York	Principal	
1976	Fighting Mad	Senator Hingle	
1977	Greased Lightning	Billy Joe Byrnes	
1978	The Boys in Company C	Sergeant Curry	
1979	Norma Rae	Leroy Mason	
1979	Fast Charlie... the Moonbeam Rider	'Pop' Bauer	
1979	Butch and Sundance: The Early Days	Captain Prewitt	
1980	Brubaker	Dr. Fenster	
1981	The Howling	Charlie Barton	
1981	Harry's War	Major Andrews	
1981	First Monday in October	Nebraska Attorney	
1983	Independence Day	Andy Parker	
1987	La Bamba	Howard	
1987	Summer Heat	Strother	
1987	Born in East L.A.	Border Patrol Sergeant	
1987	Good Morning, Vietnam	General Taylor	
1989	Blind Fury	Claude MacCready	
1990	Pastime	Clyde Bigby	
1991	Career Opportunities	Roger Roy McClellan	
1991	City Slickers	Clay Stone	
1991	The Last Boy Scout	Sheldon 'Shelly' Marcone	
1992	Article 99	Inspector General	
1992	Of Mice and Men	The Boss	
1992	The Distinguished Gentleman	Zeke Bridges	
1993	Fire in the Sky	Blake Davis	
1994	The Hudsucker Proxy	Zebulon Cardoza	
1994	Ace Ventura: Pet Detective	Riddle	
1994	Guarding Tess	Sheriff Janson	Uncredited
1994	City Slickers II: The Legend of Curly's Gold	Clay Stone	
1994	Walker Texas Ranger 3: Deadly Reunion	C.D. Parker	
1996	Up Close & Personal	Buford Sells	
1999	The Corndog Man	'Ace' Barker	
2000	South of Heaven, West of Hell	Sheriff Harris	
2003	Blind Horizon	Deputy Shirl Cash	(final film role)

=== Television ===
Year	Title	Role	Notes
1970	My Sweet Charlie	Grady	Television movie
1971	Evel Knievel	Jack Decataur	Television movie
1972	Bonanza	Mr. Kirby	Episode: "Riot"
1972	McMillan & Wife	Sheriff	Episode: "Terror Times Two"
1973	Gunsmoke	Tuck	Episode: "Whelan's Men"
1973	The Girls of Huntington House	Harry	Television movie
1973	Hawkins	Carl Jackson	Episode: "Die, Darling, Die"
1973	Sunshine	Bartender	Television movie
1973–75	The Waltons	Mr. Denton / B.C. Graddy	3 episodes
1974	Apple's Way	Farmer	Episode: "The Miller"
1974	The Texas Wheelers	Sheriff	2 episodes
1974	Where Have All The People Gone?	Jim Clancy	Television movie
1974	The Mary Tyler Moore Show	Hal	Episode: "What Are Friends For?
1975	Cannon	Sergeant 'Sonny' Wills	Episode: "Coffin Corner"
1975	Blazing Saddles	Fern Malaga	Television movie Also known as Black Bart
1975	Switch	Verly Terrace	Episode: "The Man Who Couldn't Lose"
1975	Three for the Road		Episode: "The Rip-off"
1975–76	The Rockford Files	Palm Springs Tan Tony / Claude Orzeck / B.J.	3 episodes
1976	Petrocelli	Artie Jacobs	Episode: "The Falling Star"
1976–78	Alice	Floyd / Policeman / Morgan	4 episodes
1977	Lou Grant	Hotel Manager	Episode: "Aftershock"
1977	Man from Atlantis	Artemus Washburn	Episode: "Shoot-Out at Land's End"
1978	Thaddeus Rose and Eddie	Judge	Television movie
1978	Cindy	Sergeant	Television movie
1978	Just Me and You	Gas Station Owner	Television movie
1978	The Critical List	Charlie	Television movie
1979	How the West Was Won	Judge Carter	Episode: "The Rustler"
1979	Backstairs at the White House	Charles Cramer	Television mini-series Episode: "#1.2"
1979	Silent Victory: The Kitty O'Neil Story	Doctor	Television movie
1979	Young Maverick		Episode: "A Fistful of Oats"
1980	Hart to Hart	Wilbur Pierson	Episode: "Color Jennifer Dead"
1980	Kenny Rogers as The Gambler	Conductor	Television movie
1980	When the Whistle Blows	'Bulldog'	2 episodes
1980	The Georgia Peaches	Jarvis Wheeler	Television movie
1980	WKRP in Cincinnati	Al 'Smilin' Al'	Episode: "A Mile in My Shoes"
1981	Dallas	Senator Pascomb	Episode: "Making of a President"
1981	Coward of the County	Car-Wash	Television movie
1981	Today's FBI	Sheriff	Episode: "Terror"
1981	CHiPs	Jake	Episode: "Finders Keepers"
1981	The Children Nobody Wanted	McNaulty	Television movie
1982	The Blue and the Gray	Cavalry General On Balloon Field	Television mini-series Episode: "Part 2"
1982	Missing Children: A Mother's Story	Lander Hughes	Television movie
1983	Cutter to Houston	Mayor Warren Jarvis	9 episodes
1983	The Dukes of Hazzard	Hanson	Episode: "Witness: Jesse Duke"
1983	Living Proof: The Hank Williams Jr. Story	Dr. Graham	Television movie
1983	Gun Shy	Mr. Bender	Episode: "Pardon Me Boy, Is That the Quake City Choo Choo?"
1983	Tucker's Witch	Sheriff Trout	Episode: "Murder Is the Key"
1983–86	The A-Team	Zack / Pete Stockton	2 episodes
1984	AfterMASH	Harry	3 episodes
1984	W*A*L*T*E*R	Sergeant Sowell	Television short
1985	The Atlanta Child Murders	Jerry Armstrong	Television mini-series 2 episodes
1985	Airwolf	Chester Hansen	Episode: "Natural Born"
1985	Hail to the Chief	Texab #2	Episode: "#1.4"
1985	Highway to Heaven	MacGill	2 episodes
1985	Badge of the Assassin	Airport Guard	Television movie
1986	Remington Steele	Harrison Bumpers	Episode: "Suburban Steele"
1986	Dream West	President James Polk	Television mini-series 2 episodes
1986	Mr. Sunshine		Episode: "Too Many Cooks"
1987	Nutcracker: Money, Madness & Murder	Tesch	Television mini-series 3 episodes
1987	The Alamo: 13 Days to Glory	Dr. Pollard	Television movie
1987	Our House	Bob 'Farmer Bob' Brewer	Episode: "Giving 'em the Business"
1987	Private Eye	Calvin	Episode: "Blue Hotel Pt.1"
1988	Longarm		Television movie
1988	Splash, Too	Karl Hooten	Television movie
1988	Shooter	Rizzo	Television movie
1988	A Stoning in Fulham County	Judge Manning	Television movie
1988	Quiet Victory: The Charlie Wedemeyer Story	Ted Simonsen	Television movie
1989	L.A. Law	Robert Kenyon	Episode: "I'm in the Nude for Love"
1989	Unconquered	'Bear' Bryant	Television movie
1989	Star Trek: The Next Generation	'Texas'	Episode: "The Royale"
1989	The Road Raiders	'Crankcase'	Television movie
1989	The Heist	Stuckey	Television movie
1989–90	Ann Jillian	Duke Howard	6 episodes
1990	The Young Riders	Erastus Hawkins	Episode: "Then There Was One"
1990	Capital News		Episode: "Pilot"
1990	Sporting Chance	'Packy' Dillon	Television movie
1990	Matlock	Reverend Morley Phelps	Episode: "The Madam"
1990	The Court-Martial of Jackie Robinson		Television movie
1991	Quantum Leap	Gene	Episode: "Justice - May 11, 1965"
1992	Home Improvement	John Binford	2 episodes
1992	Murder, She Wrote	Sheriff Pat McAllester	Episode: "Angel of Death"
1992	Northern Exposure	Colonel Gordon McKearn	Episode: "Lost and Found"
1993	Tales from the Crypt	Mr. Petermeyer	Episode: "Oil's Well That Ends Well"
1993–99	Walker, Texas Ranger	C.D. Parker	155 episodes

== Death ==
On January 17, 2004, Willingham died in his sleep of a heart attack in Palm Springs at the age of 72. A veteran of the United States Army during the Korean War, he is buried at Riverside National Cemetery in Riverside, California.
