= Aces 'N' Eights =

2008 TV film

- Genre: Action; Drama; Western
- Written by: Dennis Shryack; Ronald M. Cohen
- Directed by: Craig R. Baxley
- Starring: Casper Van Dien; Bruce Boxleitner; Ernest Borgnine
- Music by: Gary Chang
- Country of origin: United States
- Original language: English

Production
- Executive producers: Larry Levinson; Nick Lombardo; Michael Moran; Matt Fitzsimons
- Producer: James Wilberger
- Cinematography: Yaron Levy
- Editor: Christine Kelley
- Running time: 88 minutes
- Production companies: Larry Levinson Productions; RHI Entertainment

Original release
- Network: Ion
- Release: March 15, 2008

Aces 'N' Eights is a 2008 American Western television film from RHI Entertainment, starring Casper Van Dien, Bruce Boxleitner and Ernest Borgnine. It is directed by Craig R. Baxley and written by Ronald M. Cohen and Dennis Shryack. Aces 'n Eights first aired on ION on March 15, 2008 in the US and on June 5, 2008 in the UK. A DVD release of the film was released by Genius Entertainment in May 2008.

== Premise ==
Settling in the west, the settlers of a town suddenly find themselves being shot down. With no law and order to be found, justice falls onto the shoulders of a rancher (played by Ernest Borgnine) and a gunslinger (played by Casper Van Dien).

== Cast ==
- Casper Van Dien as Luke Rivers
- Ernest Borgnine as Thurmond Prescott
- Bruce Boxleitner as D.C. Cracker
- Deirdre Quinn as Jo Tanner
- Jack Noseworthy as Riley
- Jake Thomas as Noah
- Jeff Kober as Tate
- William Atherton as Howard
