= Brilliant (film) =

2004 film directed by Roger Cardinal

- Directed by: Roger Cardinal
- Written by: Robert Bergman
- Produced by: Roger Cardinal; Carmelo Caruana
- Starring: Erika Eleniak; Bruce Boxleitner
- Cinematography: Walter Bal
- Edited by: Jason PJ Deschamps; Tom Strnad
- Production companies: Warehouse Films; Lithuania Film Studios
- Distributed by: Oasis International (World-wide); IFM Film Associates (Select territories); Shoreline Entertainment (Recent International releases)
- Release date: February 15, 2004
- Running time: 94 minutes
- Country: Canada
- Language: English

Brilliant is a 2004 Lithuanian-Canadian thriller film directed by Roger Cardinal, and starring Erika Eleniak and Bruce Boxleitner.

== Plot ==
Elizabeth Braden (Deborah Kelly) is a promising medical student working with renowned neurosurgeon, Dr. Dietrich (Boxleitner) on a high-tech research facility. Their work consists of finding a drug that would enhance memory. However, Elizabeth wakes up one day realizing that seven days have been stolen from her own memory. To find out what happened, she seeks the help of her friend, Ricky (Eleniak) and her lover, Joel (Matthew Boylan). But she soon realizes that there is nobody she can trust.

== Filming ==
The film was shot through several locations on Quebec, Canada. Some of the locations used for the film were John Abbott College, Sainte-Anne-de-Bellevue, and Mirabel International Airport in Montreal, Oka Beach in Oka, and the city of Mirabel.

== Cast ==
- Erika Eleniak as Ricky Smith
- Bruce Boxleitner as Dr. Dietrich

== Release ==
The film, produced by Lithuania Film Studios, was released in Canada on February 15, 2004, and on March 28, 2004, on the United States.
