= Hard Ground =

2003 television film by Frank Q. Dobbs

- Genre: Western
- Written by: Frank Q. Dobbs; David S. Cass Sr.
- Directed by: Frank Q. Dobbs
- Starring: Burt Reynolds; Bruce Dern; Seth Peterson; Amy Jo Johnson
- Music by: Joe Kraemer
- Country of origin: United States
- Original language: English

Production
- Executive producers: Larry Levinson; Robert Halmi Jr.
- Producers: Randy Pope; Lincoln Lageson
- Cinematography: Maximo Munzi
- Editor: Jennifer Jean Cacavas
- Running time: 120 minutes
- Production companies: Hallmark Entertainment; MAT IV

Original release
- Network: The Hallmark Channel
- Release: July 12, 2003

Hard Ground is a 2003 American Western television film directed by Frank Q. Dobbs, and starring Burt Reynolds and Bruce Dern. It was the final film directed by Dobbs. The cinematography was made by Maximo Munzi. It aired on The Hallmark Channel on July 12, 2003.

== Cast ==
- Burt Reynolds as John "Chill" McKay
- Bruce Dern as Sheriff Hutch Hutchinson
- Amy Jo Johnson as Elizabeth Kennedy
- Seth Peterson as Joshua
- David Figlioli as Billy Bucklin
- Martin Kove as Floyd
- Larry Hankin as Toothless
- Michael Shamus Wiles as Mundo
- Bill Henderson as Junior Gunn
- Sergio Calderón as General Jesus Navarro
- Randy Stripling as McMordy
- David Atkinson as Deputy Dunlap
- Edward Faulkner as Warden
- David S. Cass Sr. as Pike
- Frank Sharp as Tall man
- Shawn Patrick Nash as Outlaw
- Steve Cobbs as Prison guard
- Dennis Fitzgerald as Escort corporal
- Brad Heiner as Gunman
- Lance W. Lanfear as Mexican rebel
- Robert A. Nowotny as Cowpoke in cantina
- William Rick Young as Gunman

== Reception ==
The Movie Scene said the film "does come up very short and at times the forced story elements makes it almost laughable."
