= The Heroes of Desert Storm =

1991 film by Don Ohlmeyer

- Written by: Lionel Chetwynd
- Directed by: Don Ohlmeyer
- Starring: Richard Assad; Lance August; Eric Avery Weiss
- Music by: Sylvester Levay
- Country of origin: United States
- Original language: English

Production
- Producers: Don Ohlmeyer; Johanna Persons; Keith Ulrich; Sheila Vavasour U'Ren
- Cinematography: Stephen C. Confer
- Editor: Billy Fox
- Running time: 92 min.

Original release
- Release: October 6, 1991

The Heroes of Desert Storm is a 1991 American film that told the story of the Persian Gulf War's Operation Desert Shield and Operation Desert Storm. A docudrama, it was presented as addressing the topic from the point of view of several participants.

The film was directed in cooperation with the Bush administration. After a brief disclaimer mentioning that the film makes no distinction between actors and actual participants, the film opens on an introduction by President Bush.

== Plot ==
Rather than a single overarching plotline, the film depicts a series of vignettes featuring various American service members and their families, all of which play out against the backdrop of the Gulf War. Throughout the film, several of the service members are interviewed by the filmmakers regarding their personal feelings about the war and how it has affected their lives and the lives of their families.

Guy Hunter, Jr., Steven Shaefer, Steve Tate, Beverly Clark, Phoebe Jeter, Jonathan Alston, Ben Pennington, Mary Rhoads, Gary Buckholz, Devon Jones and Lawrence Slade are activated for Desert Shield. The activations mean that Pennington does not get to tell his family goodbye, Jeter does not get to see her ill grandmother for one last time, Maldonado misses the birth of his daughter, and Linda Buckholz has to show her wedding to the guests on video.

Several Iraqi soldiers surrender to a Marine squad and cringe when the Marines fire a warning shot. The treatment of prisoners of war by Iraqi and American forces are compared and contrasted.

The F-14 Devon Jones is flying is hit by a surface-to-air missile. Jones lands in Iraq before dawn and activates his emergency transmitter. Soon Ben Pennington finds him and secures him for liftoff while gunners watch for the enemy.

Private Steven Shaefer has volunteered for Desert Storm duty, and quickly upon arriving in Kuwait meets Specialist Jonathan Alston. Alston knows that Shaefer is inexperienced in combat, and questions him about his training.

The ground war starts. Marine Captain Michael Shupp instructs Ford and Crumes' unit to fight professionally to keep one another safe, but to reserve compassion for Saddam's draftees. Shupp orders his men only to fire in self-defense after the enemy surrenders.

Guy Hunter, Jr., gets tortured again after a coalition strike. Threatened with execution and blindfolded, Hunter shows no fear, and says "just do it."

Beverly Clark and her best friend Mary Rhoads are at a processing center for incoming U.S. soldiers, in Dhahran. Beverly tells Mary she has come to peace about being deployed in a danger zone, and Mary invites Beverly to join her for fresh air, though Beverly declines. Suddenly there is a Scud alarm and Mary watches in horror as Beverly and her comrades are hit by the incoming warhead. Beverly's family in Pennsylvania is notified of her death and her funeral is shown.

Alston and Shaefer volunteer to kill an Iraqi suicide squad ready to detonate an ammunition dump. Shaefer distracts the squad with his M-16 while Alston tosses in a hand grenade.

The P.O.W.'s are freed and the U.S. troops return home to widespread jubilation, including Linda Buckholz in her wedding gown. The celebration contrasts with Phoebe Jeter at the grave site of her grandmother.

The film ends with President George Herbert Walker Bush giving an address celebrating the defeat of aggression and the restoration of Kuwait to its people.

== Cast ==
- Daniel Baldwin as Sergeant Ben Pennington
- Angela Bassett as Lieutenant Phoebe Jeter
- Marshall Bell as Walter Wojdakowski
- Michael Champion as Warrant Officer Guy Hunter Jr.
- Ken Foree as Gunnery Sergeant Leroy Ford
- Gary Hershberger as Captain Steve Tate
- Laura Leigh Hughes as Specialist 4th Class Beverly Clark
- Kris Kamm as Private Stephen Shaefer
- Kevin Kilner as Captain Shupp
- Steven Williams as Jonathan Alston
- Ricky Clay as Son (uncredited)
- Mark Lerdall as Himself, Pararescueman (uncredited)
- Joe Ruffo as Guard (uncredited)

== Reception ==
TV Guide describes the film as follows: ”A chronicle of the Persian Gulf War that re-creates on videotape the stories of combatants". Variety gave the film a positive review.

Roger Stahl, in his book Through the Crosshairs, stated that ”the real heroes of the film are the blinking weapons themselves, especially those that provide the alibi for rerunning long targeting footage.”

Various commentators noted that the film typically attempted to remove ’the wall that distinguishes reality from illusion.” to the point that he film has been called a ’soap opera -like TV movie’.

A review in the Los Angeles Times concluded (on October 4, 1991): ”Besides, the celebration may be premature. The tone of this movie conveys a message that Operation Desert Storm put down tyranny in the Gulf and ended the threat from Iraq. Judging by recent headlines, however, someone forget to tell that to Saddam Hussein.”
