= Bruce Boxleitner =

American actor and writer (born 1950)

- Boxleitner at Dragon Con in 2026
- Born: Bruce William Boxleitner; May 12, 1950 (age 76); Elgin, Illinois, U.S.
- Occupations: Actor, writer
- Years active: 1973–present
- Known for: Luke Macahan; Alan Bradley/Tron; Lee Stetson a.k.a. Scarecrow; Captain John Sheridan
- Spouses: Kathryn Holcomb (m. 1977; div. 1987) Melissa Gilbert (m. 1995; div. 2011) Verena King (m. 2016)
- Children: 3

Bruce William Boxleitner (born May 12, 1950) is an American actor and science fiction and suspense writer. He is known for his leading roles in the television series: How the West Was Won, Bring 'Em Back Alive, Scarecrow and Mrs. King (with Kate Jackson) and Babylon 5 (as John Sheridan in seasons 2–5, 1994–99). He is known for his dual role as the characters Alan Bradley and Tron in the 1982 Walt Disney Pictures film Tron, a role which he reprised in the 2003 video game Tron 2.0, the 2006 Square-Enix/Disney crossover game Kingdom Hearts II, the 2010 film sequel, Tron: Legacy and the animated series Tron: Uprising. He co-starred in most of the Gambler films with Kenny Rogers, where his character provided comic relief. He also voiced General Moss in the films AniMen: Triton Force and AniMen: The Galactic Battle.

== Early life ==
Boxleitner was born on May 12, 1950, in Elgin, Illinois. He attended Prospect High School in Mount Prospect, Illinois, and the Goodman School of Drama at the Art Institute of Chicago (now at DePaul University).

== Career ==
=== Television ===
Boxleitner is known for his leading roles in the television series How the West Was Won, Bring 'Em Back Alive, Scarecrow and Mrs. King (with Kate Jackson and Beverly Garland), and Babylon 5 (as John Sheridan in seasons 2–5, 1991–95). Bruce Boxleitner even has Amigas of which the Amiga was used to Make all 5 Seasons 1990 -1995, and the Spinoffs and the Movies of Babylon 5.

He also starred in The Gambler (as "Billy Montana", alongside Kenny Rogers: 1980, 1983 and 1987) and in such television films as Judith Krantz's Till We Meet Again and Danielle Steel's Zoya. In 2005, he co-starred as Captain Martin Duvall in Young Blades. He has also starred in several films within the Babylon 5 universe, including Babylon 5: In the Beginning (TV, 1998), Babylon 5: Thirdspace (TV, 1998), Babylon 5: A Call to Arms (TV, 1999), and the direct-to-DVD Babylon 5: The Lost Tales (2007).

Boxleitner has appeared in many other TV shows, including an appearance in 1973 as Rick Welsh, a University of Minnesota Track Star, in the season four episode, "I Gave at the Office", of The Mary Tyler Moore Show. Other appearances include Gunsmoke, including the last episode of its twenty-year run; Tales from the Crypt; Touched by an Angel; The Outer Limits and She Spies. In 1982, he played Chase Marshall in the TV film Bare Essence, with Genie Francis. He was a member of the cast of Heroes for seasons three and four, playing New York Governor Robert Malden in three episodes. He also appears on the television series Chuck as the father of Devon Woodcomb. He was in such made-for-television films as The Secret, Hope Ranch, Falling in Love with the Girl Next Door, Pandemic, Sharpshooter and Aces 'n' Eights.

Boxleitner was a guest-star on NCIS in the fall of 2010. He played Vice Admiral C. Clifford Chase, a high-ranking Navy official. Boxleitner also lends his voice to the animated version of his iconic character Tron in the animated series Tron: Uprising. The series premiered on Disney XD on June 7, 2012. He also reprises the character Alan Bradley/Tron from the films Tron and Tron: Legacy. From 2013 to 2015, he played Bob Beldon, the owner of the local bed and breakfast, in the Hallmark Channel series Cedar Cove.

Boxleitner later recurred on Supergirl portraying Baker, the vice-president of the United States who is later sworn in as the new president after Olivia Marsdin (Lynda Carter) is revealed as an extraterrestrial. He gained the role after Brent Spiner stepped down due to a scheduling conflict.

From 2019, Boxleitner had a recurring role on the Hallmark Movies & Mysteries series of films The Matchmaker Mysteries.

=== Film ===
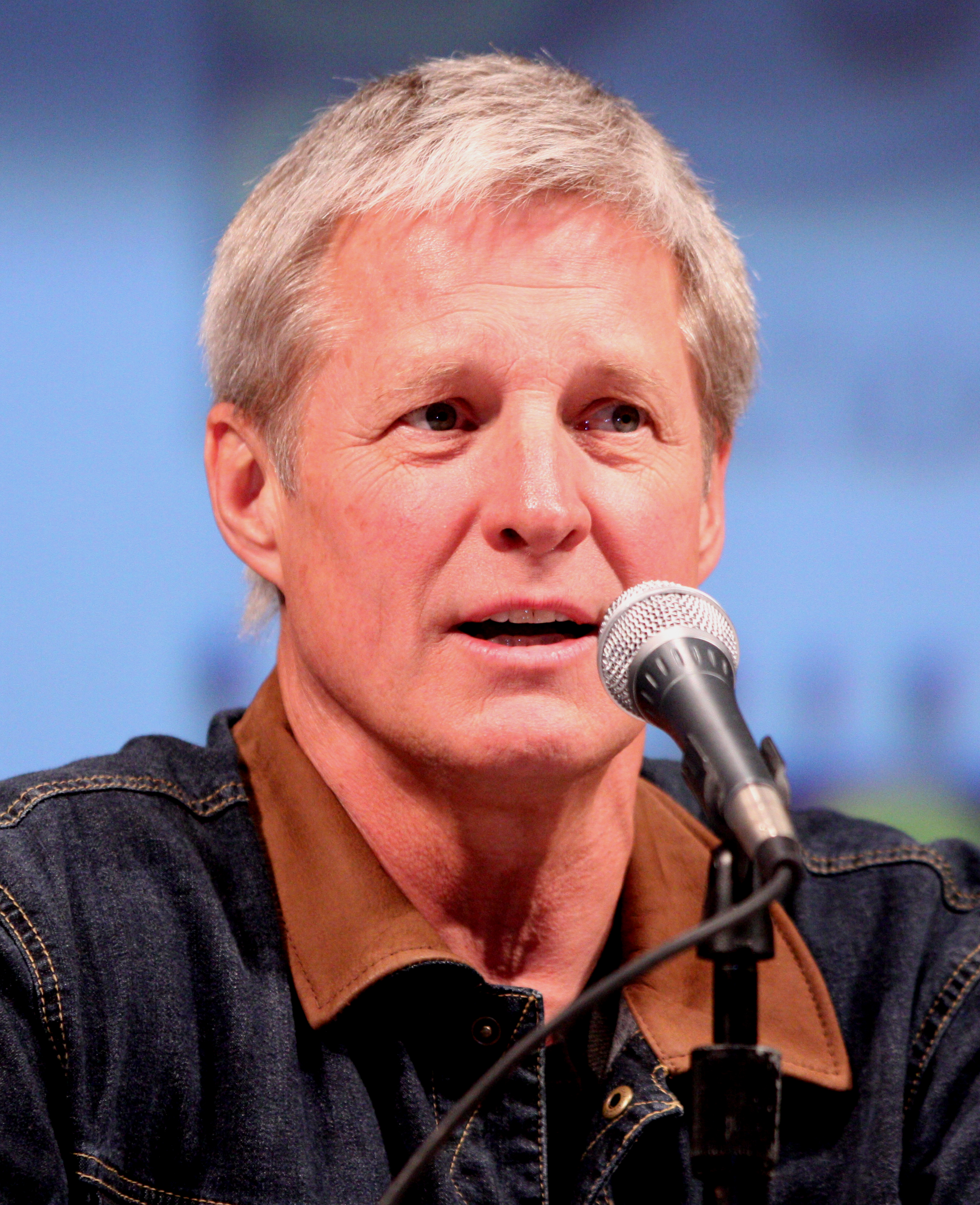
Bruce Boxleitner at the 2010 San Diego Comic-Con in July 2010

He has appeared in several theatrical films, including Tron (in which he played the title role) and The Baltimore Bullet (1980) with James Coburn. He reprised his role in the Tron sequel Tron: Legacy and in the video game Tron: Evolution which was released alongside the film Tron: Legacy, as he did for the sequel video game named Tron 2.0, and Disney/Square Enix crossover video game Kingdom Hearts II. Boxleitner also voiced Col. John Konrad in video game Spec Ops: The Line. He also starred as Confederate General James Longstreet in the 2003 film Gods and Generals. He provides the voice of Colin Barrow in the animated science fiction horror film Dead Space: Downfall, based on the video game Dead Space. Other films he has performed in include: Kuffs, The Babe, Brilliant, Snakehead Terror, Legion of the Dead, King of the Lost World, Shadows in Paradise and Transmorphers: Fall of Man.

In July 2015, Boxleitner said that he is done with the Tron franchise, as "it's been too up and down for me. I would rather not just keep going. I don't want to repeat my career anymore."

=== Modeling ===
From 1986 to 1989, Boxleitner appeared in advertisements for Estee Lauder's "Lauder For Men".

=== Novels ===
Boxleitner is the author of two science fiction novels with a Western setting, Frontier Earth (1999) and Searcher (2001).

=== Audio books ===
Boxleitner played a major role in the audio dramatization of The Great Secret, part of the Golden Age of Fiction series by L. Ron Hubbard. He also played Captain Gavin Blaire in the unabridged version of World War Z.

== Personal life ==
Boxleitner's first marriage was to American actress Kathryn Holcomb, who co-starred with him on How The West Was Won as his on-screen sister Laura. They had two sons together.

Boxleitner's second marriage was to American actress Melissa Gilbert. They have a son born in 1995. Gilbert also guest-starred as Boxleitner's on-screen wife, Anna Sheridan, during Season 3 of Babylon 5. On March 1, 2011, Gilbert announced that she and Bruce had separated after 16 years of marriage. On August 25 of the same year, it was reported that Gilbert had filed for divorce.

In 2003, Boxleitner was appointed to the Board of Governors of the National Space Society, a nonprofit, educational space advocacy organization founded by Dr. Wernher von Braun.

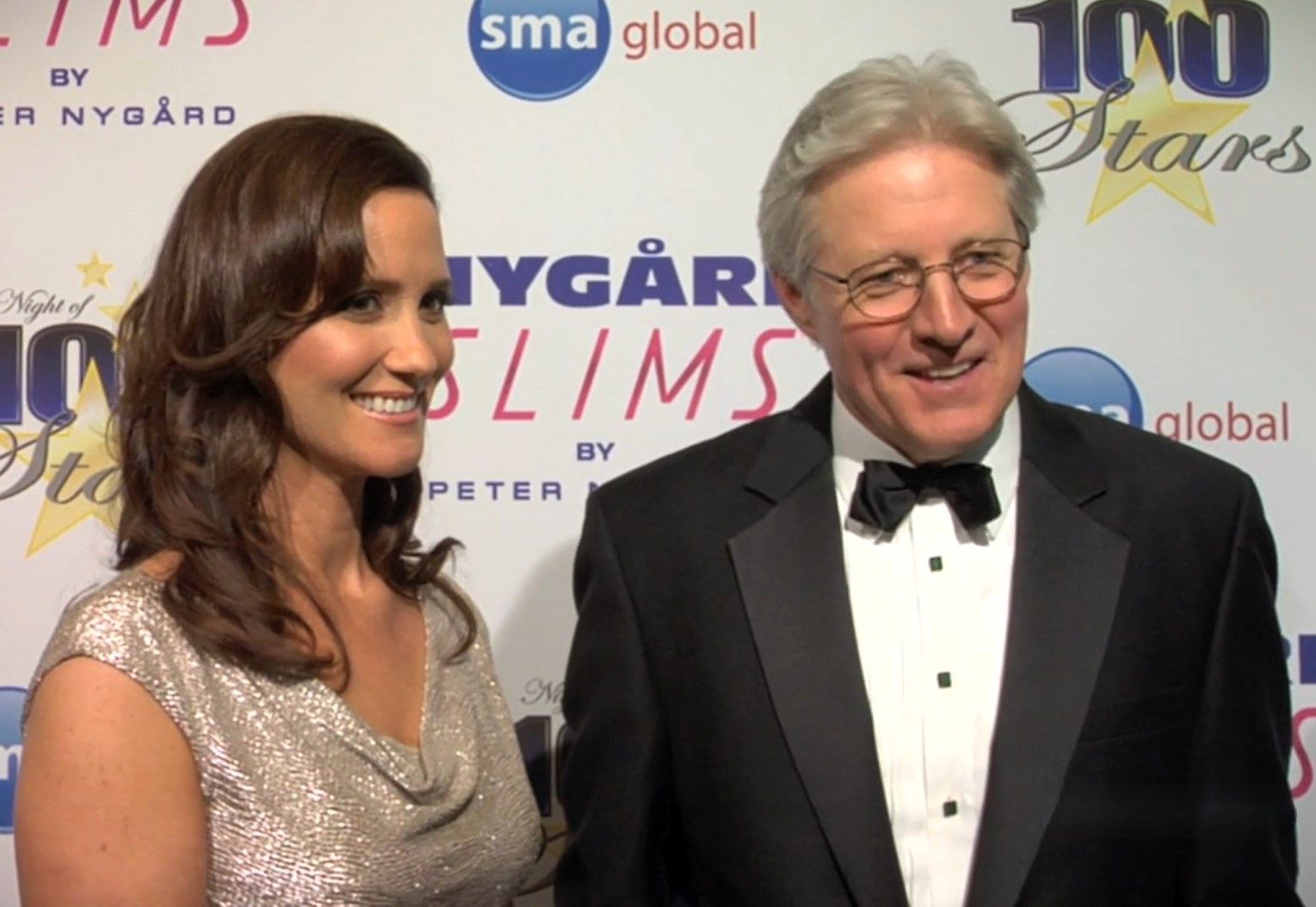
Verena King and Boxleitner in 2015

He was friends with actress Beverly Garland for nearly 30 years. He met her on an episode of How The West Was Won, and later co-starred alongside her on Scarecrow & Mrs. King, though he had very few scenes with her. Then, in 1986, Boxleitner presented Garland the Golden Boot Award. After the cancellation of Scarecrow, Boxleitner remained close to Garland, contacting her consistently, until her death, on December 5, 2008. He said in an interview: "I used to keep up with Beverly Garland until she passed. There was actually a hotel named after her. She was such a trip. She was a great lady."

Bruce is currently married to publicist Verena King.

== Filmography ==
=== Film ===
Year	Title	Role	Notes
1975	Sixpack Annie	Bobby Joe	
1980	The Baltimore Bullet	Billie Joe Robbins	
1982	Tron	Alan Bradley / Tron	
1990	Breakaway	Joey	
1991	Diplomatic Immunity	Cole Hickel	
1992	Kuffs	Officer Brad Kuffs	
1992	The Babe	Joe "Jumpin' Joe" Dugan	
1999	Free Fall	Mark Ettinger	
2000	The Perfect Nanny	Dr. Robert Lewis	
2001	Life in the Balance	Eric Johnson	
2002	Contagion	President Howard	
2002	The Only Witness	Agent Nicholas Preston	
2003	Gods and Generals	Lieutenant General James Longstreet	
2004	Brilliant	Dr. Dietrich	
2005	Legion of the Dead	Sheriff Jones	
2005	King of the Lost World	Lieutenant Challenger	
2007	Babylon 5: The Lost Tales	President John J. Sheridan	Direct-to-video
2007	The Simpsons Movie	Dome Depot	Voice
2008	Dead Space: Downfall	Colin Barrow	Voice, direct-to-video
2009	Transmorphers: Fall of Man	Sheriff Hadley Ryan	Direct-to-video
2010	Shadows in Paradise	Captain Dyer	
2010	AniMen: Triton Force	General Moss	Voice
2010	Tron: Legacy	Alan Bradley / Tron / Rinzler	
2011	51	Colonel Martin	
2011	Tron: The Next Day	Alan Bradley	Short film
2012	AniMen: The Galactic Battle	General Moss	Voice
2013	Silver Bells	Bruce Dalton	Direct-to-video
2018	The Oath	Vice President Hogan	
2023	Babylon 5: The Road Home	John Sheridan	Voice, Direct-to-video
2023	Far Haven	Ben Watkins	
2024	Space Command Redemption	General Joe Haldeman	
2026	Batman: Knightfall	Commissioner Gordon	Voice, Direct-to-video
TBA	Gettysburg 1863	Samuel Schmucker	Filming

=== Television films ===
Year	Title	Role	Notes
1974	The Chadwick Family	Danny	
1975	A Cry for Help	Richie Danko	
1976	The Macahans	Luke Macahan	
1976	Kiss Me...Kill Me	Douglas Lane	
1977	Murder at the World Series	Cisco	
1978	Happily Ever After	Jack	
1980	Kenny Rogers as The Gambler	Billy Montana	
1981	Fly Away Home	Carl Danton	
1983	Kenny Rogers as the Gambler: The Adventure Continues	Billy Montana	
1983	I Married Wyatt Earp	Wyatt Earp	
1986	Passion Flower	Larry Janson	
1986	Louis L'Amour's Down the Long Hills	Scott Collins	
1987	Angel in Green	Captain William Wicker	
1987	Kenny Rogers as the Gambler, Part III: The Legend Continues	Billy Montana	
1988	Red River	Matthew Garth	
1988	The Town Bully	Robert Doniger	
1989	From the Dead of Night	Peter Langford	
1989	Road Raiders	Charlie Rhodes	
1991	Murderous Vision	Detective Kyle Robeshaw	
1992	The Secret	Patrick Dunmore	
1992	Perfect Family	Allan Bodine	
1992	Double Jeopardy	Jack Hart	
1993	Flight from Justice	Michael Shafer	
1993	House of Secrets	Dr. Frank Ravinel	
1994	Gunsmoke: One Man's Justice	Davis Healy	
1994	Wyatt Earp: Return to Tombstone	Sam - Sheriff of Cochise County	
1994	Gambler V: Playing for Keeps	Billy Montana	
1995	Danielle Steel's Zoya	Clayton Andrews	
1998	Babylon 5: In the Beginning	Captain John J. Sheridan	
1998	Babylon 5: Thirdspace	Captain John J. Sheridan	
1999	Babylon 5: A Call to Arms	Captain John J. Sheridan	
2002	Perilous	Judd Ross	
2002	Hope Ranch	J.T. Hope	
2003	Killer Flood: The Day the Dam Broke	Jordan Walker	
2004	Snakehead Terror	Sheriff Patrick James	
2004	They Are Among Us	Hugh	
2004	Saving Emily	Gregory	
2005	Detective	Ketledge	
2005	A Killer Upstairs	Detective Bruning	
2006	Falling in Love with the Girl Next Door	Frank Lucas	
2006	Double Cross	James	
2006	Mystery Woman: Wild West Mystery	Clint Lawson	
2007	Pandemic	Kenneth Friedlander	
2007	Sharpshooter	Sheriff Gardner	
2008	Bone Eater	Sheriff Steve Evans	
2008	Aces 'N' Eights	D.C. Cracker	
2010	Lego Atlantis: The Movie	Captain Ace Speedman	Voice
2011	Love's Everlasting Courage	Lloyd Davis	
2013	The Thanksgiving House	Parker Mather	
2015	So You Said Yes	Nick Blanche	
2016	Wedding Bells	Charlie Turner	
2016	Double Mommy	Scott Davick	
2017	Gourmet Detective: Eat, Drink, and Be Buried	Jim Ross	
2018	The Christmas Contract	Tim Guidry	
2019	Matchmaker Mysteries: A Killer Engagement	Nick Columba	
2019	Holiday Date	Walter Miller	
2020	Roux the Day: A Gourmet Detective Mystery	Jim Ross	
2020	Matchmaker Mysteries: A Fatal Romance	Nick Columba	
2021	Matchmaker Mysteries: The Art of the Kill	Nick Columba	
2024	Christmas Under the Northern Lights	Doug Barnes	Great American Family

=== Television series ===
Year	Title	Role	Notes
1973	The Mary Tyler Moore Show	Rick	Episode: "I Gave at the Office"
1974	Hawaii Five-O	Cam Farraday	Episode: "We Hang Our Own"
1975	Gunsmoke	Toby Hogue	Episode: "The Sharecroppers"
1975	Hawaii Five-O	Kevin Caulder	Episode: "And the Horse Jumped Over the Moon"
1975	Police Woman	Ed Krohl	Episode: "Paradise Mall"
1976	Baretta	Tom	Episode: "The Left Hand of the Devil"
1976	Hawaii Five-O	Paul Colburn	Episode: "The Capsule Kidnapping"
1976–1979	How the West Was Won	Luke Macahan	25 episodes
1979	The Last Convertible	George Virdon	3 episodes
1980	Wild Times	Vern Tyree	2 episodes
1981	East of Eden	Charles Trask	Episode: "Part One"
1982	Bare Essence	Chase Marshall	2 episodes
1982–1983	Bring 'Em Back Alive	Frank Buck	17 episodes
1983–1987	Scarecrow and Mrs. King	Lee "Scarecrow" Stetson	89 episodes
1989	Judith Krantz's Till We Meet Again	Jock Hampton	2 episodes
1991	Tales from the Crypt	Winton Robbins	Episode: "Top Billing"
1994	The Maharaja's Daughter	Patrick O'Riley	3 episodes
1994–1998	Babylon 5	Captain John J. Sheridan	87 episodes Nominated—Saturn Award for Best Actor on Television
1996	ABC Afterschool Special	Mr. Mahar	Episode: "Me and My Hormones"
1998	Touched by an Angel	Scott Tanner	Episode: "The Peacemaker"
1999	Dead Man's Gun	Frank Santee	Episode: "Bad Boys"
2000	The Outer Limits	Senator Wyndom Brody	Episode: "Decompression"
2000	Twice in a Lifetime	Ray Patterson / Dr. Goode	Episode: "Fallen Angel"
2003	She Spies	The Chairman	4 episodes
2005	Crossing Jordan	Foster Eldridge	Episode: "Family Affair"
2005	Commander in Chief	Tucker Baynes	Episode: "First Choice"
2005	Young Blades	Captain Martin Duvall	13 episodes
2006	American Dad!	Lee "Scarecrow" Stetson	Episode: "Tears of a Clooney"
2007	Cold Case	Huck Oberland	Episode: "The Good-Bye Room"
2008–2009	Chuck	Dr. Woody Woodcomb	2 episodes
2008–2009	Heroes	Robert Malden	3 episodes
2010	NCIS	Vice Admiral C. Clifford Chase	Episode: "Broken Arrow"
2011	Chaos	Ray Bishop	Episode: "Glory Days"
2012	GCB	Burl Lourd	4 episodes
2012–2013	Tron: Uprising	Tron	Voice, 17 episodes
2013–2015	Cedar Cove	Bob Beldon	30 episodes
2017	NCIS	Vice Admiral C. Clifford Chase	Episode: "A Bowl of Cherries"
2018–2019	Supergirl	President Phillip Baker	10 episodes
2019	When Calls the Heart	Gentlemen Johnny Boone	Episode: "Hope is with the Heart"
2020	Prop Culture	Himself	Episode: "Tron"
2022	The Orville	President Alcuzan	3 episodes
2024	Blue Ridge	Robert 'Oak' Miller	2 episodes

=== Video games ===
Year	Title	Voice role	Notes
2003	Tron 2.0	Alan Bradley	
2006	Kingdom Hearts II	Tron	
2010	Tron: Evolution	Tron	
2012	Spec Ops: The Line	Lieutenant Colonel John Konrad	
