= The Gambler (film series) =

TV film series

- Inspired by: "The Gambler" by Kenny Rogers
- Written by: Jeb Rosebrook (3–4); Roderick Taylor (3); Joe Byrne (4)
- Teleplay by: Jim Byrnes (1–2); Frank Q. Dobbs (5); Caleb Pirtle III (5)
- Story by: Cort Casady (1); Jim Byrnes (1); Frank Q. Dobbs (5); David S. Cass (5); Kelly Junkerman (5)
- Directed by: Dick Lowry (1–4); Jack Bender(5)
- Starring: Kenny Rogers; Bruce Boxleitner
- Composers: Larry Cansler (1–3); Mark Snow (4); Larry Brown (5); Edgar Struble (5)
- Country of origin: United States
- Original language: English

Production
- Executive producers: Ken Kragen (1–5); Dick Lowry (3); Lelan Rogers (3); Kelly Junkerman (5)
- Producers: Jim Byrnes (1); Ken Kragen (1–2); Dick Lowry (2); Patrick Markey (3); Ann Kindberg (4); Kelly Junkerman (5)
- Cinematography: Joe Biroc (1); James Pergola (2); Robert M. Baldwin (3)
- Editor: Edward J. Pei
- Running time: 951 minutes
- Production companies: Kragen & Company (1); Lion Share Studios (2); Wild Horses Productions (3); Kenny Rogers Productions (4–5); Ken Kragen Productions (5); RHI Entertainment (5)

Original release
- Network: CBS
- Release: April 8, 1980 – November 22, 1987
- Network: NBC
- Release: November 3, 1991
- Network: CBS
- Release: October 2, 1994

The Gambler is a series of five American Western television films starring Kenny Rogers as Brady Hawkes, a fictional Old West gambler. The character was inspired by Rogers' hit single "The Gambler".

== Films ==
Film	U.S. airdate	Director	Teleplay by	Story by	Producers
Kenny Rogers as The Gambler	April 8, 1980	Dick Lowry	Jim Byrnes	Cort Casady & Jim Byrnes	Jim Byrnes & Ken Kragen
Kenny Rogers as The Gambler: The Adventure Continues	November 28–29, 1983	Dick Lowry	Jim Byrnes	Unknown	Ken Kragen & Dick Lowry
Kenny Rogers as The Gambler, Part III: The Legend Continues	November 22–24, 1987	Dick Lowry	Jeb Rosebrook & Roderick Taylor	Jeb Rosebrook & Roderick Taylor	Patrick Markey
The Gambler Returns: The Luck of the Draw	November 3–4, 1991	Dick Lowry	Jeb Rosebrook & Joe Byrne	Jeb Rosebrook & Joe Byrne	Ann Kindberg
Gambler V: Playing for Keeps	October 2–4, 1994	Jack Bender	Frank Q. Dobbs & Caleb Pirtle III	Frank Q. Dobbs & David S. Cass	Kelly Junkerman

=== Kenny Rogers as The Gambler (1980) ===
Kenny Rogers as The Gambler debuted on CBS on April 8, 1980. It was a ratings and critical success that has spawned four sequels. The show won a Best Edited Television Special Eddie Award and garnered two Emmy Award nominations (for cinematography and editing of a limited series).

Kenny Rogers stars as Brady Hawkes, the titular gambler, who embarks on a journey to meet Jeremiah (Ronnie Scribner), the young son he never knew, after Jeremiah sends him a letter. Along the way, Brady meets Billy Montana (Bruce Boxleitner) and the two become friends. Billy (while trying to help Brady in his quest) fancies himself as a professional poker player on his own. Although Billy makes mistakes along the way (some of these include trying to find a way to cheat or do some smooth talking), Brady makes sure that he stays on good behavior during a train ride to Yuma. The duo help Jennie Reed (Lee Purcell), a prostitute who has trouble with a train baron. At the end, Brady's son's stepfather (Clu Gulager) is confronted.

=== Kenny Rogers as The Gambler: The Adventure Continues (1983) ===
Kenny Rogers again stars as Brady Hawkes in the miniseries Kenny Rogers as The Gambler: The Adventure Continues which premiered November 28 and 29, 1983, on CBS. The show was an even bigger ratings success than the first and was nominated for two Emmy Awards (sound editing and sound mixing of a limited series).

Billy Montana, Brady, and his son Jeremiah (now played by Charles Fields) are traveling to a gambling event in San Francisco when they encounter the vicious McCourt gang. The McCourt gang force the train to stop and they take Jeremiah hostage and demand a $1 million ransom. Brady and Billy are determined to get Jeremiah back as well as the $1 million ransom which belonged to the train boss. Brady and Billy find help in their mission and meet a female bounty hunter Kate Muldoon played by Linda Evans. Kate is the fastest female gun in the west. They form a posse together in a race to save Jeremiah.

==== Cast ====
- Linda Evans as Kate Muldoon
- Johnny Crawford as Pete Masket
- Charles Fields as Jeremiah
- David Hedison as Carson
- Bob Hoy as Juno
- Brion James as Reece
- Paul Koslo as Holt
- Cameron Mitchell as Col. Greeley
- Mitchell Ryan as Charlie McCourt
- Gregory Sierra as Silvera
- Ken Swofford as Wichita Pike
- Macon McCalman as Sheriff Rawlins
- Harold Gould as Stowbridge
- Lee Paul as Pettibone

=== Kenny Rogers as The Gambler, Part III: The Legend Continues (1987) ===
Kenny Rogers as The Gambler, Part III: The Legend Continues was broadcast November 22 and 24, 1987, on CBS.

In this installment, Brady Hawkes and Billy Montana help protect some Sioux Indians from the government and some cattle thieves.

==== Cast ====
- George Kennedy as Gen. Nelson Miles
- Linda Gray as Mary Collins
- Marc Alaimo as Pvt. Bob Butler
- Jeff Allin as Homesteader
- George American Horse as Chief Sitting Bull
- Michael Berryman as Cpl. Catlett
- Sam Boxleitner as Boy with Hat
- Jeffrey Alan Chandler as Plow Salesman
- Melanie Chartoff as Deborah
- Richard Chaves as Iron Dog
- Matt Clark as Sgt. Grinder
- Charles Durning as Sen. Henry Colton
- Dean Stockwell as James McLaughlin
- Jeffrey Jones as Buffalo Bill Cody

=== The Gambler Returns: The Luck of the Draw (1991) ===
The Gambler Returns: The Luck of the Draw is a 1991 television film starring Kenny Rogers as Brady Hawkes and Reba McEntire as Burgundy Jones. Rogers reprises Hawkes in the fourth installment of the series. The two-part film originally aired November 3 and 4, 1991, on NBC, making it the only one of the five "Gambler" TV movies which did not air on CBS. It was nominated for a Costume Design Emmy.

==== Plot ====
Professional gambling is set to be outlawed in three weeks. Burgundy Jones (McEntire) is tasked with getting Brady Hawkes safely to San Francisco for a poker tournament before the law is enacted. Complicating his task, Hawkes remains resentful after a hard-fought loss to another professional poker player in England, and anticipates facing him again in San Francisco.

==== Production ====
The film features Rogers' character running across a galaxy of old TV western stars played by the original actors, including Gene Barry as Bat Masterson, Hugh O'Brian as Wyatt Earp, Jack Kelly as Bart Maverick, Clint Walker as Cheyenne Bodie, David Carradine as Kung Fu's Caine, Chuck Connors and Johnny Crawford from The Rifleman, Brian Keith as The Westerner, James Drury and Doug McClure from The Virginian (Drury and McClure play thinly disguised different characters, Jim and Doug, due to rights issues for Owen Wister's characters), and Paul Brinegar from Rawhide.

The characters are attending a poker game said to be in honor of "the late Mr. Paladin" from Have Gun — Will Travel. (The actor who played him, Richard Boone, had died in 1981.) The game was played at the hotel at which Paladin lived. The game's dealer is "Hey Girl", Paladin's friend (Lisa Lu). As each veteran character appears, a few bars from his original series' theme momentarily plays in the background.

The Gambler Returns: The Luck of the Draw was directed by Dick Lowry.

==== Cast ====
- Kenny Rogers as Brady Hawkes
- Rick Rossovich as Ethan Cassidy
- Reba McEntire as Burgundy Jones

In alphabetical order:

- Claude Akins as Theodore Roosevelt
- Dion Anderson as Fight Promoter
- Gene Barry as Bat Masterson
- Bruce Boxleitner as Billy Montana
- Paul Brinegar as Cookie
- Kent Broadhurst as Sailor Johnson
- Jere Burns as Cade Dalton
- David Carradine as Kwai Chang Caine
- Chuck Connors as Lucas McCain
- Johnny Crawford as Mark McCain
- Juliana Donald as Ruby Roy Bean (billed as Juli Donald)
- James Drury as Jim
- Linda Evans as Kate Muldoon
- Brian Keith as The Westerner
- Jack Kelly as Bart Maverick
- Patrick Macnee as Sir Colin
- Doug McClure as Doug
- Hugh O'Brian as Wyatt Earp
- Park Overall as Melody O'Rourke
- Christopher Rich as Lute Cantrell
- Mickey Rooney as The Director (based upon D.W. Griffith)
- Brad Sullivan as Judge Roy Bean (recast due to Edgar Buchanan's death)
- Dub Taylor as The Westerner's Friend
- Clint Walker as Cheyenne Bodie

=== Gambler V: Playing for Keeps (1994) ===
Gambler V: Playing for Keeps is the fifth installment of The Gambler series and the first not directed by Dick Lowry, with Jack Bender taking the helm. The two-part movie premiered on October 2 and October 4, 1994, on CBS.

==== Plot ====
Brady Hawkes' son, Jeremiah (with Kris Kamm as the third actor in the role) gets involved with outlaws Butch Cassidy (Scott Paulin) and the Sundance Kid (Brett Cullen). Brady tries to save him before he winds up in jail or dead.

==== Cast ====
- Scott Paulin as Butch Cassidy
- Brett Cullen as The Sundance Kid
- Mariska Hargitay as Etta Place
- Kris Kamm as Jeremiah Hawkes
- Stephen Bridgewater as Flatnose Curry
- Richard Riehle as Frank Dimaio
- Ned Vaughn as Ford Hayes
- Martin Kove as Black Jack
- Dixie Carter as Lillie Langtry
- Loni Anderson as Fanny Porter
- Geoffrey Lewis as Lynch

== Cast ==
	Films				
Character	Kenny Rogers as The Gambler	Kenny Rogers as The Gambler: The Adventure Continues	Kenny Rogers as The Gambler, Part III: The Legend Continues	The Gambler Returns: The Luck of the Draw	Gambler V: Playing for Keeps
Brady Hawkes	Kenny Rogers				
Billy Montana	Bruce Boxleitner				Bruce Boxleitner
Jeremiah Hawkes	Ronnie Scribner	Charles Fields			Kris Kamm
Arthur Stobridge	Harold Gould				
Jennie Reed	Lee Purcell				
Eliza	Christine Belford				
Rufe Bennett	Clu Gulager				
Doc Palmer	Lance LeGault				
Kate Muldoon		Linda Evans		Linda Evans	
Masket		Johnny Crawford			
Carson		David Hedison			
Pvt. Bob Butler			Marc Alaimo		
Sen. Henry Colton			Charles Durning		
Chief Sitting Bull			George American Horse		
Bat Masterson				Gene Barry	
Kwai Chang Caine				David Carradine	
Lucas McCain				Chuck Connors	
Mark McCain				Johnny Crawford	
The Westerner				Brian Keith	
Bart Maverick				Jack Kelly	
Marshal Wyatt Earp				Hugh O'Brian	
Cheyenne				Clint Walker	
Butch Cassidy					Scott Paulin
Sundance Kid					Brett Cullen
Etta Place					Mariska Hargitay

== Unrealized plans ==
On March 15, 2011, Kenny Rogers told Jimmy Fallon on his television show, Late Night with Jimmy Fallon, that he was asked if he would want to be in another Gambler movie. He began by saying that he had a bad knee and thought it would be hard for him, but continued and said that the first scene in the movie would be a shootout. Supposedly, he would get shot in the shoulder and knee to cover his physical disabilities. However, in the years that followed Rogers announced his retirement from show business and stated that his 2016 tour would be his last and after this he would be spending his time with family. Rogers later died on March 20, 2020.

== In other media ==
=== Books ===
- Pirtle, Caleb III; Dobbs, Frank Q. (1996). Jokers Are Wild. Kenny Rogers' The Gambler. Vol. 1. Penguin Group. ISBN 978-1-57297-053-3.
- Pirtle, Caleb III; Dobbs, Frank Q. (1996). Dead Man's Hand. Kenny Rogers' The Gambler. Vol. 2. Boulevard Books. ISBN 978-1-57297-093-9.
- Pirtle, Caleb III; Dobbs, Frank Q. (1998). Dying Man's Bluff. Kenny Rogers' The Gambler. Berkley Publishing Group. ISBN 978-1-57297-181-3.

=== Slot machine ===
A video slot machine based on The Gambler can be found in most Las Vegas casinos. It was manufactured by now-defunct International Game Technology.
