= Unconquered (1989 film) =

1989 American TV film

- DVD cover
- Genre: Drama
- Teleplay by: Pat Conroy
- Story by: Martin Chitwood
- Directed by: Dick Lowry
- Starring: Dermot Mulroney; Peter Coyote
- Theme music composer: Arthur B. Rubinstein
- Country of origin: United States
- Original language: English

Production
- Producer: Dick Lowry
- Production location: Atlanta
- Cinematography: Robert M. Baldwin
- Editors: Byron "Buzz" Brandt; Anita Brandt-Burgoyne
- Running time: 113 minutes
- Production companies: Alexandra Film Productions; CBS Entertainment Production; Dick Lowry Productions; Double Helix Films

Original release
- Network: CBS
- Release: January 15, 1989

Unconquered is a 1989 American made-for-television drama film written by Martin Chitwood (story) and Pat Conroy (teleplay). It was directed and produced by Dick Lowry, and co-produced by Martin Chitwood and Dean Silvers. The film is based on the struggles of Richmond Flowers Sr., the Alabama attorney general who opposed many of Governor George Wallace's segregationist policies in the 1960s, and his son, star athlete Richmond Flowers Jr.

== Plot ==
In Montgomery, Alabama, in 1962, State Attorney Richmond Flowers Sr., is one of the few state officials willing to confront racial injustices, even at the risk of his family's safety. His stance against segregation leads to personal and professional ostracization as well as threats. Meanwhile, his son, Richmond "Rich" Flowers Jr., strives to excel as an athlete amid hostility because of his father's political views. The narrative explores their personal and public battles during a turbulent time in American history.

== Cast ==
- Peter Coyote as Richmond Flowers Sr.
- Dermot Mulroney as Richmond Flowers Jr.
- Tess Harper as Mrs. Mary Flowers
- Jenny Robertson as Cindy
- Frank Whaley as Arnie
- Bob Gunton as Gov. George Wallace
- Ted Henning as Judge
- Wilbur Fitzgerald as The Foreman
- Noble Willingham as Bear Bryant
