= Category 6: Day of Destruction =

2004 television film directed by Dick Lowry

- Cover of the original DVD release of the film
- Written by: Matt Dorff
- Directed by: Dick Lowry
- Starring: Nancy McKeon; Thomas Gibson; Chandra West; Randy Quaid; Dianne Wiest; Brian Dennehy
- Theme music composer: Jeff Rona; Joseph Williams
- Country of origin: United States
- Original language: English
- No. of episodes: 2

Production
- Producers: Leslie Belzberg; Randy Sutter; Robert M. Sertner; Frank von Zerneck
- Cinematography: Neil Roach
- Editors: Tod Feuerman; Scot J. Kelly
- Running time: 174 minutes
- Production company: Von Zerneck Sertner Films

Original release
- Network: CBS
- Release: November 14 – November 17, 2004

Related
- Category 7: The End of the World

Category 6: Day of Destruction is a 2004 four-hour television miniseries that was broadcast in the United States on CBS in two parts, with the first part aired on November 14 and the second on November 17. It was later released to DVD on February 15, 2005. The miniseries focuses primarily on the city of Chicago as three unusual storm systems approach from the west, north and south and combine over the city to form a massive hurricane. At the same time a hacker-induced power outage cuts communications leaving a journalist and power officials scrambling to find the cause.

The miniseries was a success for CBS in terms of ratings, as it was the highest-rated movie for the channel in two years, and it earned the highest ratings during the November sweeps week with 19.4 million viewers watching the first part. Critics were less favorable towards the film, with most panning the film for its dialog, implausible science, and poor acting. Some reviewers did praise the film's high-budget special effects and felt the film had at least some "charm." In November 2005 a four-hour sequel, Category 7: The End of the World, aired in the same two-part format.

== Plot ==
Andy Goodman is a week away from a forced retirement from his position as chief meteorologist at the National Weather Administration's Severe Weather Center. However, tornadoes level Las Vegas, an area normally not prone to the storms. Concerned and upset that the storm system formed unnoticed and that they were unable to warn the people, Goodman begins closely tracking the system. Goodman receives field reports from his friend "Tornado Tommy" and assistance from new intern Sabrina Rogers. As time passes, he realizes the system is heading towards Chicago, joined by an unusual warm storm coming from the south, which is already causing a record-breaking heat wave in the city, and an abnormally early cold front from the Arctic.

Meanwhile, Mitch Benson, the Chief of Operations at Midwest Electric, is struggling to keep power going to the residents because the six-week heat wave is straining the system and residents are refusing to follow power conservation requests. To get more energy, he is working with the company's largest supplier, Lexer, but the company's CEO is trying to find new ways to profit from this crisis. Benson also finds himself caught in a conflict of interest as he is having an affair with the Lexer's public relations representative, Rebecca Kerns.

Ambitious reporter Amy Harkin is stuck reporting on the heat wave while trying to find proof behind the scenes that Lexer and Midwest are responsible for the lack of sufficient power. The Secretary of Energy, Shirley Abbott, is actively warning various politicians and the president that the power grid is too outdated to handle real natural disasters and that it is too vulnerable to attack. Dan London, the chief engineer of Lexer, has also repeatedly warned Lexer that their systems are too vulnerable to hackers, but the company is only interested in going with the cheapest options. He decides to blow the whistle on the company to Harkin, but as he refuses to appear on camera, Harkin's boss will not allow the piece to air.

As the storms approach, early storms knock out the city's primary power generating plant, and Benson is forced to negotiate with Lexer for even more power. Not realizing the devastating nature of the storms coming, London sets out to force Lexer to listen to his warnings by hacking the system and causing a cascading chain reaction that knocks out all of the power in Chicago. Goodman and his team are unable to warn the citizens that the storms have formed into a category 6 hurricane over the Great Lakes and will hit Chicago head on.

Harkin realizes what happened to the power and rushes to find London, while Benson and Secretary Abbott gather energy from a multitude of other companies to get around the breakdown at Lexer. Unaware of what each party is doing, London quickly reverses the hacks at the same time as the energy starts flowing in from other companies. This overloads the system, knocking out the entire Midwest power grid as the storm hits the city and London is killed in the process.

Unable to do anything further, Benson rushes to find his family after he receives word that they are trapped at a mall and that his daughter has been accidentally shot by her ex-boyfriend. "Tornado Tommy" drives around the city filming tornadoes and is oblivious to another tornado that is headed to his direction. He puts his camcorder in a suitcase and throws it out his window and he is sucked in the tornado. Harkin gives Benson a ride to the mall to pick up his family, then they go to rescue her pregnant sister-in-law from an elevator. After Amy's cameraman is injured while rescuing her sister-in-law, Harkin stays behind with him and their neighbor. The others rush to reach the airport during the 15-minute eye of the hurricane, where they are picked up in a plane piloted by Harkin's brother, an air force weather pilot. After the storm passes, Harkin keeps her promise and tells London's story on air.

== Cast ==
- Thomas Gibson as Mitch Benson
- Nancy McKeon as Amy Harkin
- Chandra West as Rebecca Kerns
- Brian Markinson as Chris Haywood
- Nancy Ann Sakovich as Jane Benson
- Randy Quaid as "Tornado Tommy" Dixon
- Dianne Wiest as Energy Secretary Shirley Abbott
- Brian Dennehy as Andy Goodman
- Ari Cohen as Dan London
- Christopher Shyer as Craig Shilts
- Arnold Pinnock as Jason
- Chad Willett as Jeff Harkin
- Horis McLaren as Helen Travers
- Janaya Stephens as Laura Harkin
- Petra Wildgoose as Lindsey Benson
- Jeff Sutton as Garth Benson
- Jeff Clarke as George Kiley
- Alicia Johnston as Sabrina Rogers
- Amanda Brugel as Leslie Singer
- Ryan Kennedy as Eric
- Andrew Jackson as Walt Ashley
- Kjartan Hewitt as Tad (credited as Kerr Hewitt)
- Trevor Botkin as Rick
- David Lawrence Brown as Control Center Engineer
- Dean McKenzie as Bob
- Dave Price as Engineer
- Brian Frank as Sammy Slots
- Rebecca Gibson as Honey
- Brian Kawakami as Mr. Yoshiko
- Junko Bailey as Japanese Woman
- Ryan Schenk as Paramedic

== Production ==
Executive producer Bob Sertner wanted the film to have higher-end special effects to mimic the quality of those seen in feature films. To do this, the film uses visual computer effects created by special effects company Area 51 FX, which created over 100 different shots using the digital modeling program LightWave 3D. During shooting, special effect supervisor Craig Weiss noted that the scenes with Randy Quaid were particularly difficult to capture on film due to his appearing in multiple scenes where his character was chased by twisters and surrounded by their destructive aftermaths. The actors also faced new challenges, as the film often replaced traditional green screen setup, where the special effects were added during editing, with live shots taken with the effects in place at the same time. Nancy McKeon, who was pregnant with her first child during production, filmed some of her scenes using a green screen. She found the experience to be fun, noting that it challenges actors to use their imaginations while performing. She also found it easy to play a television reporter due to her being a self-admitted "news junkie."

Unable to find wind machines powerful enough to mimic hurricane-force winds, Sertner brought in a jet engine to aim at the actors and props during necessary scenes. Three dimensional storyboards, called animatics, were used to allow the filmmakers to see what a scene would look like before shooting, using a digital version of the actors. The various weather scenes blended together stock footage of real natural disasters with the computer-generated shots, with care taken to match up the details of the various scenes.

== Release ==
Category 6 was initially aired in the United States on CBS as a two-part, four-hour miniseries. The first part aired on Sunday, November 14, 2004, and the second followed on Wednesday, November 17, 2004. It was later aired in Australia on February 12, 2005.

The miniseries was first released to Region 1 DVD by CBS Television on February 15, 2005. On February 13, 2007, Lions Gate Entertainment released it, together with fellow disaster miniseries 10.5, as a two feature set.

The full miniseries aired in Jamaica on Television Jamaica in 2017.

== Reception ==
The miniseries was highly successful for CBS, as 19.4 million viewers tuned in to the first part of the film and made it the channel's best-rated Sunday night movie in over two years. The second part was watched by 17 million viewers, the highest number of viewers for the channel on a Wednesday night for the fall season. Together, the two parts helped to push the channel to the top spot for the year's November sweeps week.

Despite the high ratings, the film was generally panned by critics, except for almost universal praise for the high-budget special effects. New York Magazine's John Leonard found it lacking compared to the feature film The Day After Tomorrow, though he did feel it had a certain "raffish zombie charm." Charlie McCollum of the San Jose Mercury News called it a "third-rate disaster flick — with lame dialogue, voodoo science and wooden performances — spread out over two nights and four seemingly endless hours." Aaron Barnhart of the Kansas City Star agreed, feeling the filmmakers spent their budget on special effects to the detriment of the film's dialog. He called the film an "assault on common sense" for positing the idea that the power outage would keep everyone in Chicago from knowing that "something bad" was coming. Daily Variety found the film to be full of clichés and felt the side plots gave the appearance that the film was cast first and that the plot had been written to work around the actors. In comparing the film to a Reese's Peanut Butter Cup, the magazine notes that it had "two or more disastrous taste treats providing a very loud macro backdrop to the micro tales that play out involving the characters." Kay McFadden of the Seattle Times also felt the storm became a backdrop "for a contrived soap opera that could take place in sunshine or rain" and that the special effects were fun, but did not feel properly integrated into their scenes.

"Category 6" has high aspirations. Executive producers Robert Sertner and Frank von Zerneck aren't interested in providing the escapist pleasures of a "10.5" or "The Poseidon Adventure." Instead, expect a brow-furrowing cornucopia of environmental abuse, job cuts, price-rigging, global warming, nuclear energy, gentrification, aging industrial infrastructure, tourist exploitation, computer hackers, workplace sexism, corporate corruption, piggish consumption and infidelity.

— Kay McFadden, The Seattle Times

The Chicago Tribune's Sid Smith found the film to be "pretty lousy, despite a wealth of impressive special effects that end with an image of a completely demolished Chicago skyline." He found the plot to be overly melodramatic and "hokey" with an excessive amount of coincidences and ill-fortunes thrown at the characters, despite the performances of the star-studded cast. Australia's The Age gave the film a slightly more favorable review, praising the stunts and special effects, though it noted the effects suffer from poor computer editing and referred to the film as "a little entertaining supertrash" that does require one to not think too much about the science to enjoy.
