= Category 7: The End of the World =

2005 American television miniseries directed by Dick Lowry

- Cover of the DVD release of Category 7
- Written by: Christian Ford; Roger Soffer
- Directed by: Dick Lowry
- Starring: Randy Quaid; Gina Gershon; Shannen Doherty; Tom Skerritt; Swoosie Kurtz; James Brolin; Robert Wagner; Adam Rodriguez; Lindy Booth
- Theme music composer: Joseph Williams
- Countries of origin: United States; Canada
- Original language: English

Production
- Producers: Lesley Oswald; Peter Sadowski; Robert M. Sertner; Frank von Zerneck
- Cinematography: Neil Roach
- Editor: Tod Feuerman
- Running time: 240 minutes
- Production company: Von Zerneck-Sertner Films
- Budget: $15,000,000

Original release
- Network: CBS
- Release: November 6 – November 13, 2005

Related
- Category 6: Day of Destruction

Category 7: The End of the World is a 2005 three-hour American made-for-television disaster miniseries and B movie. It aired in the United States on CBS in two parts, with the first part broadcast on November 6 and the second on November 13. It was directed by Dick Lowry. A sequel to the 2004 miniseries Category 6: Day of Destruction, this film starts directly after the events shown in that film, with the storm continuing to gain strength and spawning additional storms around the world, with three converging over Washington, D.C.

== Plot ==
Following the events in Category 6: Day of Destruction, the superstorm that hit Chicago is continuing to grow in size and strength, with tornadoes hitting Paris and destroying the Eiffel Tower. Judith Carr, the new head of FEMA, struggles to coordinate efforts to prepare for the aftermath of the storm and provide aid to ravaged areas. She calls in her former college lover, Dr. Ross Duffy, and her father Senator Ryan Carr to help her determine what is causing the storms and how to deal with the political issues. "Tornado Tommy", who survived his apparent death in the previous film, returns to aid in tracking the storm in the United States, assisted by scientist Faith Clavell. Similar storms are developing around the country and an interaction between urban heat islands and "falling chunks of mesosphere" fuels the storms making them more powerful. Hurricane Eduardo strikes toward Florida, while the Category 6 storm hits Buffalo, New York and travels onwards and destroys most of New York City.

During these catastrophic events, two Christian fundamentalists fake the arrival of the plagues of Egypt to lure in new converts, culminating in their kidnapping of the first-born children of Judith Carr and other high-ranking officials. When Tommy and Faith get their data to FEMA in New York, Judith realizes that Hurricane Eduardo is heading towards Washington, D.C., and the Category 6 storm in New York is heading in the same direction. When both storms collide with the mesosphere, it turns into a Category 7 hurricane, obliterating anything in its path. The force of the storm is so massive that it could potentially cause a global catastrophe.

== Cast ==
- Randy Quaid as Tornado Tommy Dixon
- Gina Gershon as FEMA Director Judith Carr
- Cameron Daddo as Dr. Ross Duffy
- Robert Wagner as Senator Ryan Carr
- Tom Skerritt as Colonel Mike Davis
- Shannen Doherty as Faith Clavell
- Adam Rodriguez as USAF Pilot Ritter
- Lindy Booth as Brigid
- Sebastian Spence as FPS Agent Gavin Carr
- David Alpay as Billy Chamber
- Nicholas Lea as Monty Meeks
- James Brolin as Donny Hall
- Swoosie Kurtz as Penny Hall
- Noam Jenkins as Evan
- Suki Kaiser as Gayle Duffy
- James Kirk as Stuart Carr
- Rachel Skarsten as Lyra Duffy
- Peter Mooney as Peter
- Andrea Liu as Melody Chang
- John Kapelos as Jim Roberts
- Kenneth Welsh as Chief of Staff Alan Horst

== Production ==
The miniseries was produced by von Zerneck/Sertner Films, which also produced Category 6. It was filmed at various locations around Winnipeg, Manitoba, Canada and the Canadian air force base 17 Wing was used for the fictional version of Biloxi, Mississippi's Keesler Air Force Base. Air force members were tapped as extra by the production company to play the United States Air Force members seen during the film. The air force base commander noted that the filming helped to boost the local economy, due to the $600,000 in salaries generated during filming, but did not interfere with operations or security at the base.

David Price, the weather man for CBS's The Early Show who was given a cameo role in Category 6, returned for another cameo in Category 7. In this film, Price appears in a brief scene as a reporter who questions the character Judith Carr about bringing her former lover, Dr. Duffy, in to help with the storm issue. In an interview for his own show, Price said it took him a lot of practice to deliver his "crucial line" just right, with it taking four hours to shoot the brief scene. Director Dick Lowry jokingly noted that his biggest mistake in the film was giving Price the key line in that scene.

== Release ==
=== Broadcast ===
Category 7 was initially aired on CBS as a two-part, four-hour miniseries. The first part aired on Sunday, November 6, 2005. The second part aired a week later.

=== Home media release ===
The miniseries was released to DVD by Echo Bridge Entertainment on April 4, 2006, on a single disc. On March 4, 2008, Echo Bridge released the film as a two box set with another disaster film, 10.5: Apocalypse (airing later in May 2006 on NBC). This was later followed by an April 2008 release of the film to Blu-ray, and a July 2008 Blu-ray release of the two movie pack.

== Reception ==
Category 7 was the top rated network miniseries in 2006. The first part of the miniseries came in number 16 among the top 25 network programs aired in the week of October 31 – November 6, and was the second most watched program for that Sunday with 14.7 million viewers. The second part of the film was also the second most watched program for its timeslot on November 13, with 13.85 million viewers.

The film was nominated for multiple awards in 2006, including a Primetime Emmy Award for "Outstanding Sound Editing for a Miniseries, Movie or a Special." It was nominated for a Saturn Award for "Best Television Presentation", a Cinema Audio Society Award for "Outstanding Achievement in Sound Mixing for Television Movies and Mini-Series", and two Golden Reel Awards for "Best Sound Editing in Television Long Form—Dialogue and Automated Dialogue Replacement" and "Best Sound Editing in Television Long Form—Sound Effects & Foley."

Before Category 7 aired, CBS was criticized for choosing to air the miniseries only months after two devastating hurricanes, Hurricane Katrina and Hurricane Rita, hit the United States, and a third, Hurricane Wilma, causing destruction in Florida in the same month the film was slated to première.
