= Dick Lowry =

American director and film producer

- Born: September 15, 1944 (age 81); Oklahoma, United States
- Occupations: Film director, producer
- Years active: 1975–2011
- Relatives: Hunt Lowry (brother)

Dick Lowry (born 15 September 1944 in Oklahoma) is an American film director and film producer.

== Productions ==
List films were all made for television unless otherwise indicated.

- 1975: The Drought (theatrical film)
- 1980: OHMS
- 1980: Kenny Rogers as The Gambler
- 1980: The Jayne Mansfield Story
- 1981: Angel Dusted
- 1981: Coward of the County
- 1981: A Few Days in Weasel Creek
- 1982: Rascals and Robbers: The Secret Adventures of Tom Sawyer and Huckleberry Finn
- 1982: Missing Children: A Mother's Story
- 1983: Living Proof: The Hank Williams Jr. Story
- 1983: Smokey and the Bandit Part 3 (theatrical film; also actor, as Sand Dumper)
- 1983: Kenny Rogers as The Gambler: The Adventure Continues
- 1984: Pigs vs. Freaks
- 1984: Wet Gold
- 1984: The Toughest Man in the World
- 1985: Murder with Mirrors
- 1985: Wild Horses
- 1986: Dream West (three-part miniseries)
- 1987: American Harvest
- 1987: Kenny Rogers as The Gambler, Part III: The Legend Continues
- 1988: Case Closed
- 1988: In the Line of Duty: The F.B.I. Murders
- 1989: Unconquered
- 1989: Howard Beach: Making a Case for Murder
- 1990: Miracle Landing
- 1990: Archie: To Riverdale and Back Again
- 1990: In the Line of Duty: A Cop for the Killing
- 1991: In the Line of Duty: Manhunt in the Dakotas
- 1991: The Gambler Returns: The Luck of the Draw
- 1992: A Woman Scorned: The Betty Broderick Story
- 1992: In the Line of Duty: Street War
- 1992: Skin (short film)
- 1992: Her Final Fury: Betty Broderick, the Last Chapter
- 1993: In the Line of Duty: Ambush in Waco
- 1994: In the Line of Duty: The Price of Vengeance
- 1994: One More Mountain
- 1995: Texas Justice
- 1995: A Horse for Danny
- 1995: In the Line of Duty: Hunt for Justice
- 1996: In the Line of Duty: Smoke Jumpers
- 1996: Project: ALF
- 1996: Forgotten Sins
- 1997: In the Line of Duty: Blaze of Glory
- 1997: Last Stand at Saber River
- 1997: Two Came Back
- 1998: Mr. Murder (two-part miniseries)
- 1999: Atomic Train (two-part miniseries)
- 1999: A Murder on Shadow Mountain
- 1999: Y2K
- 2001: Attila (two-part miniseries)
- 2001: Follow the Stars Home
- 2001: The Diamond of Jeru
- 2001: Little John
- 2002: Heart of a Stranger
- 2004: Category 6: Day of Destruction (two-part miniseries)
- 2005: Category 7: The End of the World (two-part miniseries)
- 2005: Silver Bells
- 2011: Jesse Stone: Innocents Lost
