= Lost in the Pershing Point Hotel =

- Directed by: Julia Jay Pierrepont III
- Written by: Leslie Jordan
- Based on: Lost in the Pershing Point Hotel by Leslie Jordan
- Produced by: Julia Jay Pierrepont III; Erin Chandler
- Starring: Leslie Jordan
- Cinematography: Sacha Sarchielli
- Edited by: Ila von Hasperg
- Music by: Dan Gilboy
- Distributed by: Northern Arts Entertainment
- Release date: December 7, 2001
- Running time: 102 minutes 103 minutes 107 minutes
- Country: United States
- Language: English

Lost in the Pershing Point Hotel is a 2001 American comedy-drama film directed by Julia Jay Pierrepont III and starring Leslie Jordan. It is based on Jordan's play of the same name.

== Cast ==
- Leslie Jordan as Storyteller
- Erin Chandler as Miss Make Do
- Mark Pellegrino as Tripper
- Carlos Gomez as Nico
- Lucas Elliot Eberl as Young Storyteller
- John Ritter as Christian Therapist
- Marilu Henner as Mother
- Michelle Phillips as DeeDee Westbrook
- Kathy Kinney as Red Neck Nurse
- Arthur Hiller as Evangelist
- Sheryl Lee Ralph as Nurse
- Patrick O'Neal as Angry Bartender
- Kris Kamm as Cotton Pine
- Jesse Petrick as Johnny Striker
- Adam Wylie as Duane Striker

== Release ==
The film was released on December 7, 2001.

== Reception ==
Dennis Harvey of Variety gave the film a negative review, writing that the film "emerges far more redolent of composite fiction cliches (...) than it does credible experience. The fault lies somewhat with execution that remains stubbornly theatrical..."

Kevin Thomas of the Los Angeles Times also gave the film a negative review and wrote that the film "could stand as a textbook example of how not to bring a play to the screen."
