= Frank Q. Dobbs =

American film director

- Born: July 29, 1939; Houston, Texas, U.S.
- Died: February 15, 2006 (aged 66); Houston, Texas, U.S.
- Education: Sam Houston State Teachers College
- Occupations: Screenwriter, film director, producer and cinematographer

Frank Q. Dobbs (July 29, 1939 – February 15, 2006) was a screenwriter, film director, film producer and cinematographer notable for his work on numerous Western films and television series, including Larry McMurtry's five-hour CBS mini-series Streets of Laredo (1995).

Born in Houston, Texas, Dobbs attended Sam Houston State Teachers College, where he majored in journalism and minored in English and theater, while shooting college promotional films and also creating his own independent Western short films. After graduating in 1961, he collaborated with Ray Miller on The Eyes of Texas, a TV magazine series for Houston's KPRC, and he soon headed for Hollywood, entering the film industry by scripting two episodes of Gunsmoke in 1965–66.

== Career ==
=== Producer ===
In 1983, he co-produced Lone Star Bar and Grill for Showtime. In 1997, he was a co-producer of John Milius' Rough Riders. With Chris Black, he co-scripted the pilot of The Magnificent Seven TV series, which ran from 1998 to 2000. His association with McMurtry continued when he produced Hallmark's The Johnson County War miniseries in 2002.

=== Director ===
Dobbs made his feature film directorial debut in 1972 with the horror Western, Enter the Devil, shot in Lajitas, Texas, and followed with three other features. In 2003, he directed Burt Reynolds and Bruce Dern in the TV movie Hard Ground, a period Western about a Yuma prison escapee who plans to control the Mexican border by assembling an army of desperadoes.

=== Actor ===
He appeared as an actor in Streets of Laredo and Gambler V: Playing for Keeps (1994), which he co-scripted.

Dobbs lived in Houston, where he died of cancer at age 66.

== Awards ==
Houston: The Legend of Texas, which Dobbs produced in 1986, won a Bronze Wrangler Award. He was the executive producer of the Disney Channel documentary The Legend of Billy the Kid (1994), which won an Emmy. He was a technical consultant on Amargosa (2000), Todd Robinson's documentary about Death Valley Junction dancer-painter Marta Becket, which won a 2003 Emmy Award for cinematographer Curt Apduhan, in addition to numerous festival awards and nominations.

== Archives ==
Dobbs' Eyes of Texas is archived at Rice University's Fondren Library.
