= Randy Quaid =

American actor (born 1950)

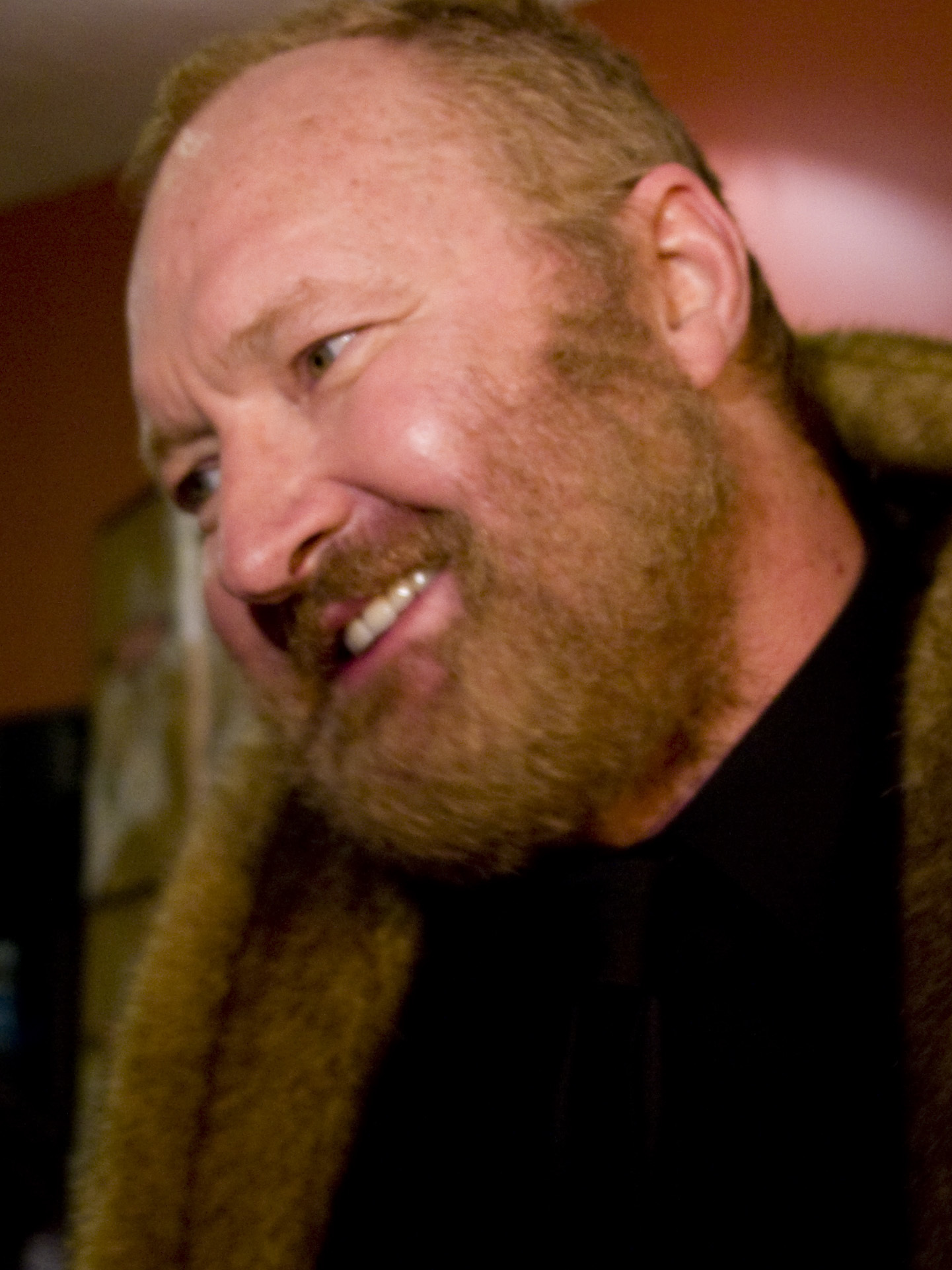
- Quaid in 2008
- Born: Randy Randall Rudy Quaid; October 1, 1950 (age 76); Houston, Texas, U.S.
- Occupation: Actor
- Years active: 1971–present
- Spouses: Ella Jolly (m. 1980; div. 1989); Evi Motolanez (m. 1989)
- Children: 1
- Relatives: Dennis Quaid (brother); Jack Quaid (nephew); Gene Autry (first cousin twice removed)

Randy Randall Rudy Quaid (born October 1, 1950) is an American actor.

He was nominated for an Academy Award, a BAFTA Award and a Golden Globe Award for his role in The Last Detail in 1973. In 1978, he co-starred as a prisoner in Midnight Express. Quaid also won a Golden Globe and was nominated for an Emmy Award for his portrayal of U.S. President Lyndon Johnson in LBJ: The Early Years (1987).

He also received Emmy nominations for his roles in A Streetcar Named Desire (1984) and Elvis (2005). Quaid is also known for his roles of Cousin Eddie in the National Lampoon's Vacation movies and Russell Casse in Independence Day (1996). He voiced Alameda Slim in the animated feature Home on the Range (2004).

== Early life and education ==
Quaid was born in Houston, Texas, to Juanita Bonniedale "Nita" (née Jordan; 1927–2019), a real estate agent, and William Rudy Quaid (1923–1987), an electrician. Quaid has English, Scots-Irish, and Cajun ancestry. Through his father, Quaid is a first cousin, twice removed, of cowboy performer Gene Autry. Randy Quaid grew up in Bellaire, Texas, a small city surrounded by Houston, and in southwest Houston. He is the older brother of actor Dennis Quaid.

In high school, he took a class in drama on a whim, although he did not expect to enjoy the lectures. After the third day, however, he was captivated by the course and decided to make acting his professional goal. He continued studying acting at the University of Houston. During one course, his teacher sent him to audition for Peter Bogdanovich, who was casting for The Last Picture Show, and Quaid won the role in what became his debut film.

== Acting career ==
=== Film ===
Randy Quaid has appeared in over 90 films. Peter Bogdanovich discovered him when Quaid was a student at the University of Houston, and he received his first exposure in Bogdanovich's The Last Picture Show. His character escorts Jacy Farrow (Cybill Shepherd) to a late-night indoor skinny-dip at a swimming pool. Other Bogdanovich films he appeared in are What's Up, Doc? and Paper Moon.

Quaid's first major critically acclaimed role was in The Last Detail (1973). He played Larry Meadows, a young United States Navy sailor on his way to serve a harsh sentence for petty theft. Jack Nicholson starred as a sailor assigned to transport him to prison. Quaid was nominated for an Academy Award for Best Supporting Actor, Golden Globe Award for Best Supporting Actor – Motion Picture, and a BAFTA Award for Best Actor in a Supporting Role.

Quaid appeared opposite Charles Bronson in the 1975 action film of a Mexican prison escape Breakout, based on actual events. In 1976, he appeared opposite Marlon Brando in The Missouri Breaks. In 1978 Quaid had a supporting role in the Alan Parker drama Midnight Express, about Americans and an Englishman imprisoned in Turkey.

In 1983, Quaid portrayed Cousin Eddie in National Lampoon's Vacation. Quaid appeared in four of the seven films in the National Lampoon's Vacation film series as the jovial redneck cousin (through marriage) to Beverly D'Angelo, wife of Chevy Chase's Clark Griswold. In 1987, he won a Golden Globe Award and was nominated for an Emmy for his portrayal of President Lyndon Johnson in LBJ: The Early Years. Quaid said that he had wanted to play Johnson since becoming an actor. "I responded to him and his wants and needs in a way I've never done with any other character," he said. Quaid also tried to portray what he learned were Johnson's political attitude:

He was on the side of the people; he did a lot for racial equality; he had the ability to look at both sides of an issue and bring two opposing sides together; he was a man of great heart and compassion ... He thought he could handle the Viet Cong the way he handled people in Texas. He thought he could reason with them. But he had no understanding of them or their culture.

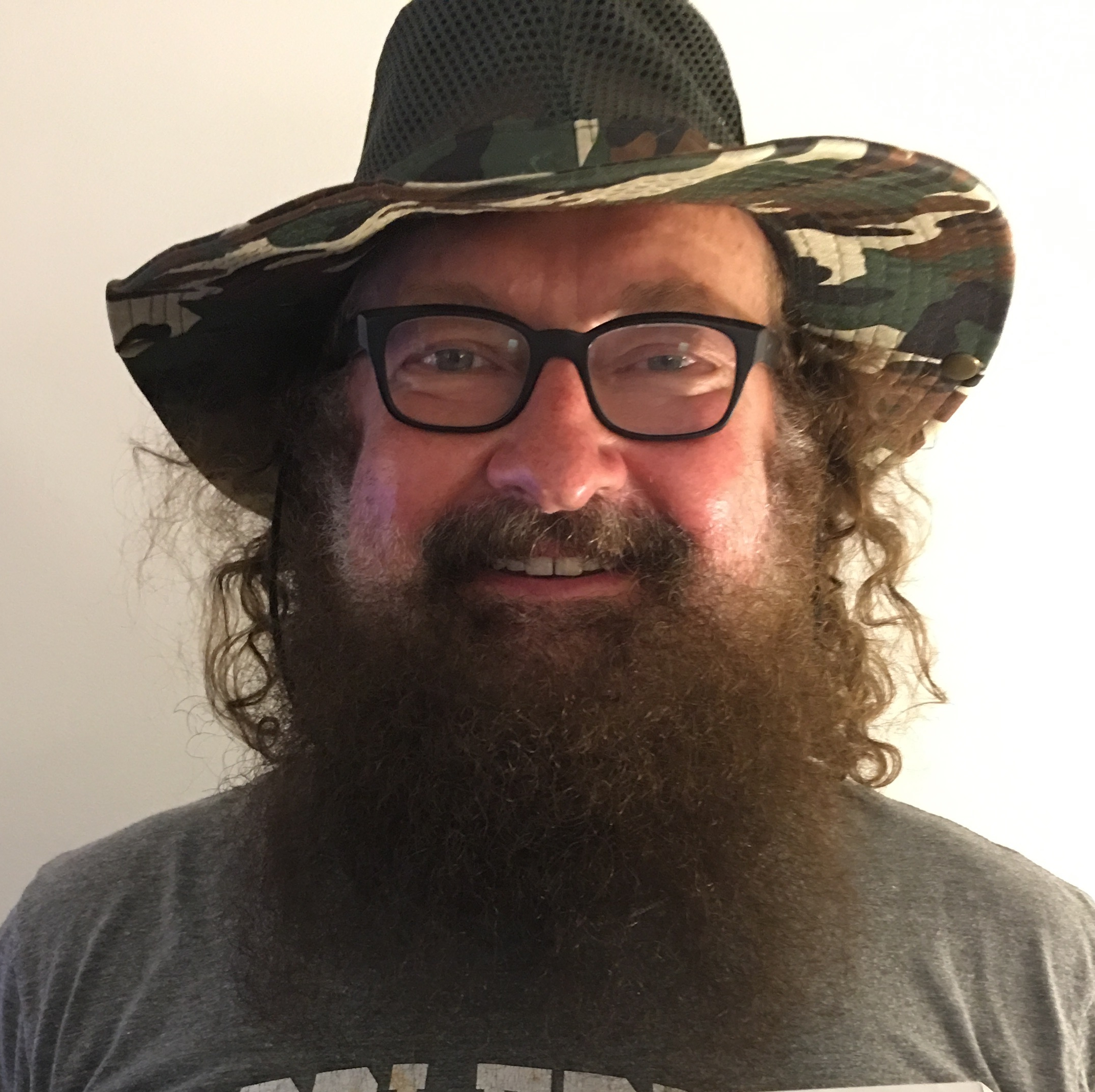
Quaid in 2017

Shortly after appearing in National Lampoon's Christmas Vacation (1989), the third installment of the series, Quaid was featured in Days of Thunder (1990) as NASCAR car owner and successful car salesman Tim Daland, a determined businessman who expects his team to be top-notch for fans and sponsors. He also starred in Quick Change with Bill Murray in 1990, and was the lead in the comedies Martians Go Home and Cold Dog Soup, released the same year. In 1992, he played the monster in Frankenstein, opposite Patrick Bergin as Victor Frankenstein. Quaid said "I wanted to make the monster not just a monster, but a disfigured man. I wanted to emphasize the human qualities. He is basically struggling for equal rights. He wants anything any man would want."

In 1994, Quaid played a newspaper columnist in the comedy-drama The Paper, and had a cameo appearance in Major League II as Johnny. He later had starring roles in the 1996 film Kingpin, where he played the Amish bowler Ishmael, as well as a role as pilot in the blockbuster science fiction film Independence Day, released the same year. He appeared in Vegas Vacation (1997), the fourth installment of the series, and was then given the lead role in a Vacation spin-off, a made-for-television film National Lampoon's Christmas Vacation 2: Cousin Eddie's Island Adventure (2003), which marks his final appearance in the franchise to date.

Quaid was the voice of cattle rustler Alameda Slim in Disney's animated feature Home on the Range (2004), and had a pivotal supporting role in Brokeback Mountain (2005) as rancher Joe Aguirre. He played the King of Spain in Goya's Ghosts (2006). Quaid had a co-starring role in the Canadian independent comedy Real Time (2008), which opened the 2008 Slamdance Film Festival. His acclaimed performance earned him a Vancouver Film Critics Circle Award.

Following his work in the direct-to-video comedy Balls Out: Gary the Tennis Coach (2009), Quaid's legal troubles prevented him from working for almost a decade. Quaid was not asked to reprise the role of Cousin Eddie in Vacation (2015), although the character is verbally referenced. He returned to performing with Rob Margolies' weight loss comedy All You Can Eat (2018), which premiered at the SOHO International Film Festival in June 2018. After the film's September 2018 screening at the Northeast Film Festival, Quaid was nominated for their award for "Best Supporting Actor in a Feature Film".

=== Television ===
In 1981, Quaid co-starred in the two part television film adaptation of John Steinbeck's novel Of Mice and Men, playing the character of Lenny. Quaid's other television appearances include a season as a Saturday Night Live (SNL) cast member (1985–1986), the role of gunslinger John Wesley Hardin in the miniseries Streets of Laredo and starring roles in the short-lived series The Brotherhood of Poland, New Hampshire (2003) and Davis Rules (1991–1992).

In 2005, he received nominations from the Golden Globe Awards and Emmy Awards for his portrayal of Elvis Presley's manager, Colonel Tom Parker, in the critically acclaimed CBS television network miniseries Elvis.

He was featured in the highly rated television films Category 6: Day of Destruction (2004) and Category 7: The End of the World (2005) and starred in Last Rites, a made-for-cable Starz/Encore! premiere movie. Quaid voiced the character Colonel Sanders in radio and television commercials for fast-food restaurant chain Kentucky Fried Chicken. Quaid's voice-over work also included commercials for Capital One, USAir, Miller and a guest role in The Ren & Stimpy Show (as Anthony's father in the second-season episode, "A Visit to Anthony"). He narrated the 2006 PBS series Texas Ranch House.

=== Theater ===
In 2004, Quaid appeared on stage undertaking the starring role of Frank in the world premiere of Sam Shepard's The God of Hell, produced by the New School University at the Actors Studio Drama School in New York. In The God of Hell, Quaid's portrayal of Frank, a Wisconsin dairy farmer whose home is infiltrated by a dangerous government operative who wants to take over his farm, was well-received and -reviewed by New York City's top theatre critics. It marked the second time that Quaid starred in a Shepard play, the first being the long running Broadway hit True West.

In February 2008, a five-member hearing committee of Actors' Equity Association, the labor union representing American stage actors, banned Quaid for life and fined him more than $81,000. The charges that brought the sanctions originated in a Seattle production of Lone Star Love, a Western-themed adaptation of William Shakespeare's The Merry Wives of Windsor, in which Quaid played the lead role of Falstaff. The musical was scheduled to come to Broadway, but producers cancelled it.

Quaid's statement on the charges was "I am guilty of only one thing: giving a performance that elicited a response so deeply felt by the actors and producers with little experience of my creative process that they actually think I am Falstaff."

== Music career ==
Quaid has performed musical work, primarily through his band Randy Quaid & The Fugitives. The group released its first single, "Star Whackers", in March 2011. An accompanying film, Star Whackers, was premiered by the Quaids in Vancouver on April 23, 2011.

== Personal life ==
=== Relationships ===
Quaid was married to Ella Marie Jolly, a former model, on May 11, 1980, and they had a daughter, Amanda Marie, born May 29, 1983. They were separated on September 9, 1986, and divorced on August 24, 1989. He said of their split, "I went through this delayed adolescent thing. I didn't want to be tied down to a family."

Quaid met Evi Quaid in December 1987 on the set of the film Bloodhounds of Broadway. They wed on October 5, 1989, at the San Ysidro Ranch, a Montecito, California, resort. His brother Dennis, his future sister-in-law Meg Ryan, and his six-year-old daughter Amanda were in attendance.

=== Legal issues ===
In 2006, Quaid, who acted in Brokeback Mountain, sued the producers for misrepresenting the film as "a low-budget, art house film with no prospect of making money" in order to secure Quaid's professional acting services at below-market rates.

In 2009, Quaid and his wife were arrested for allegedly defrauding an innkeeper in Santa Barbara by using an invalid credit card to pay a $10,000 bill. The two were released on bail that evening and subsequently paid most of the bill. However, they repeatedly failed to appear in court and warrants were issued for their arrest. They eventually appeared in court the following year, where the case was dismissed against Quaid for lack of evidence. His wife, Evi, pleaded no contest to a misdemeanor count of fraud and was placed on probation for three years in addition to having to spend 240 hours in community service.

In September 2010, Quaid and his wife were charged with burglary after they spent five days occupying the guest house in a vacant home they once owned in Santa Barbara. The Quaids claimed that the home was wrongfully transferred to a third party by the use of a forged signature. Warrants for their arrest were issued after they failed to appear in court, and as a result, they also forfeited their bail.

In October 2010, Quaid and his wife moved to Vancouver, Canada, where they sought asylum protections under the Canadian Immigration and Refugee Protection Act, stating that they feared for their lives in the United States. Border authorities arrested the couple for their outstanding warrants in the U.S. After they were granted bail, Quaid gave a press interview, and later, the couple's asylum-seeking story was detailed in an article by Vanity Fair. Quaid's wife Evi was granted Canadian citizenship in 2011, based on her parentage, and Quaid sought permanent resident status as the husband of a Canadian. In January 2013, this request was denied.

Quaid lived in Montreal beginning in 2013 and was briefly arrested for not checking in as a non-resident. In 2014, the Quaids sued the U.S. State Department for revoking their passports in 2011. By 2015, Quaid's legal appeals in Canada were exhausted, and he was notified he was to be deported. One week prior to the deportation date, the couple drove across the Canadian border into Vermont, where they were detained by U.S. Customs. The couple were detained pending an extradition procedure ordered by the State of California.

On review of the State of California's case, the Vermont judge found irregularities, and voided the extradition request, whereupon the Quaids were released and allowed to remain in Vermont without conditions. With his lawyer at his side, Quaid asserted in a press conference that the reason he was released was that the California judge had issued an arrest warrant before the alleged crime had been committed. Quaid and his wife planned to make Vermont their permanent home, as his wife grew up there. As of 2021, when Quaid considered a run in the California gubernatorial recall election, it was unclear whether the case against the Quaids was still open, according to TheWrap.

== Political views ==
After 2016, Quaid became an outspoken supporter of Donald Trump, and later became a proponent of the conspiracy theory that Trump's defeat in the 2020 United States presidential election was the result of widespread election fraud. Three weeks after the election, Trump, on his Twitter account, retweeted some of Quaid's video material claiming election fraud and wrote "Thank you Randy, working hard to clean up the stench of the 2020 Election Hoax!"

== Filmography ==
Year	Title	Role	Notes
1971	The Last Picture Show	Lester Marlow	
1972	What's Up, Doc?	Professor Hosquith	
1973	The Last Detail	Meadows	Nominated—Academy Award for Best Supporting Actor; Nominated—BAFTA Award for Best Supporting Actor; Nominated—Golden Globe Award for Best Supporting Actor – Motion Picture
1973	Paper Moon	Leroy	
1973	Lolly-Madonna XXX	Finch Feather	
1974	The Apprenticeship of Duddy Kravitz	Virgil	
1975	Breakout	Hawk Hawkins	
1976	Bound for Glory	Luther Johnson	
1976	The Missouri Breaks	Little Tod	
1977	The Choirboys	Dean	
1978	Midnight Express	Jimmy Booth	
1978	Three Warriors	Ranger Quentin Hammond	
1980	Guyana Tragedy	Clayton Ritchie	Television film
1980	The Long Riders	Clell Miller	
1980	Foxes	Jay	
1981	Heartbeeps	Charlie	
1981	Of Mice and Men	Lenny Small	Television film
1982	Inside the Third Reich	Putzi Hanfstaengl	Television film
1983	National Lampoon's Vacation	Cousin Eddie Johnson	
1984	The Wild Life	Charlie	
1984	A Streetcar Named Desire	Harold 'Mitch' Mitchell	Television film Nominated—Primetime Emmy Award for Outstanding Supporting Actor in a Miniseries or a Movie
1985	Fool for Love	Martin	
1985–1991	Saturday Night Live	Various	TV series (19 episodes)
1985	The Slugger's Wife	Moose Granger	
1986	The Wraith	Sheriff Loomis	
1987	LBJ: The Early Years	Lyndon Baines Johnson	Television film Golden Globe Award for Best Actor – Miniseries or Television Film; Nominated—Primetime Emmy Award for Outstanding Lead Actor in a Miniseries or a Movie
1987	No Man's Land	Vincent Bracey	
1987	Sweet Country	Juan	
1988	Evil in Clear River	Pete Suvak	Television film
1988	Moving	Frank Crawford; Cornell Crawford	
1988	Caddyshack II	Peter Blunt	
1988	Dead Solid Perfect	Kenny Lee	Television film
1989	Parents	Nick	Nominated—Independent Spirit Award for Best Male Lead
1989	Bloodhounds of Broadway	Feet Samuels	
1989	Out Cold	Lester	
1989	National Lampoon's Christmas Vacation	Cousin Eddie Johnson	
1990	Texasville	Lester Marlow	
1990	Quick Change	Loomis	
1990	Days of Thunder	Tim Daland	
1990	Martians Go Home	Mark Devereaux	
1990	Cold Dog Soup	Jack Cloud	
1991	Heavy Fuel (Dire Straits)	Stagehand	Music Video
1991–1992	Davis Rules	Dwight Davis	TV series (29 episodes)
1992	Frankenstein	The Monster	
1993	Freaked	Elijah	
1993	Curse of the Starving Class	Taylor	
1993	The Ren & Stimpy Show	Anthony's dad	TV series (1 episode: "A Visit to Anthony")
1994	The Paper	Michael	
1994	Major League II	Johnny	Uncredited
1994	Next Door	Lenny	Television film
1994	Roommates	Jim Flynn	Television film
1995	Bye Bye Love	Vic Damico	
1995	Ed McBain's 87th Precinct: Lightning	Detective Steve Carella	
1996	Last Dance	Sam Burns	
1996	Moonshine Highway	Sheriff Wendell Miller	Television film
1996	The Siege at Ruby Ridge	Randy Weaver	Television film
1996	Kingpin	Ishmael	
1996	Independence Day	Russell Casse	
1996	Get on the Bus	Tennessee State Trooper	Uncredited
1997	Vegas Vacation	Cousin Eddie Johnson	
1998	Hard Rain	Mike Collins	
1998	Bug Buster	George Merlin	
1998	Sands of Eden	Lenny	Television film
1999	Last Rites	Jeremy Dillon	
1999	Purgatory	Doc Woods/Doc Holiday	Television film
1999	The Debtors	Unknown	
1999	P.U.N.K.S.	Pat Utley	
1999	The Magical Legend of the Leprechauns	Jack Woods	Television film
2000	Mail to the Chief	President A. Thorton Osgood II	Television film
2000	The Adventures of Rocky and Bullwinkle	Cappy von Trapment	
2001	Not Another Teen Movie	Mr. Briggs	
2002	The Adventures of Pluto Nash	Bruno	
2002	Frank McKlusky, C.I.	Madman McKlusky	
2003	Christmas Vacation 2: Cousin Eddie's Island Adventure	Cousin Eddie Johnson	
2003	Black Cadillac	Charlie	
2003	Grind	Jock Jensen	
2003	Carolina	Ted	
2003	Kart Racer	Vic Davies	
2003	The Brotherhood of Poland, New Hampshire	Chief Hank Shaw	TV series (7 episodes)
2003	Milwaukee, Minnesota	Jerry James	
2004	Home on the Range	Alameda Slim	Voice
2004	Category 6: Day of Destruction	Tornado Tommy Dixon	
2005	Brokeback Mountain	Joe Aguirre	Nominated—Gotham Independent Film Award for Best Ensemble Cast; Nominated—Screen Actors Guild Award for Outstanding Performance by a Cast in a Motion Picture
2005	Elvis	Colonel Tom Parker	Television film Satellite Award for Best Supporting Actor – Series, Miniseries or Television Film; Nominated—Golden Globe Award for Best Supporting Actor – Series, Miniseries or Television Film; Nominated—Primetime Emmy Award for Outstanding Supporting Actor in a Miniseries or a Movie
2005	The Ice Harvest	Bill	
2005	Category 7: The End of the World	Tornado Tommy Dixon	
2005	Stanley's Dinosaur Round-Up	Rockin' Rory	Voice
2006	Goya's Ghosts	King Carlos IV	
2006	Treasure Island Kids: The Battle for Treasure Island	Captain Flint	
2008	Real Time	Reuban	Vancouver Film Critics Circle Award for Best Supporting Actor in a Canadian Film
2009	Balls Out: Gary the Tennis Coach	Coach Lou Tuttle	
2011	Star Whackers	Himself	Screened in 2011, but not yet commercially released; also producer
2018	All You Can Eat	Gordon	Nominated—Northeast Film Festival Award for Best Supporting Actor in a Feature Film
2024	The Christmas Letter	Rich	
