= Richard Michaels =

American director and producer

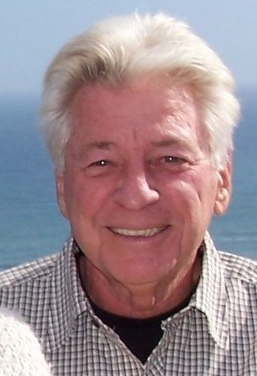
- Born: February 15, 1936 (age 90); Brooklyn, New York, U.S.
- Occupations: Director, producer
- Years active: 1954-2004
- Spouses: Toby Michaels (m. 1959; div. 1962) Kristina Hansen (m. 1964; div. 1972) Judith Penrod (m. 1986)

Richard Michaels (born February 15, 1936, in Brooklyn, New York) is a retired American film and TV show director and producer whose career spanned five decades.

His directing credits include the television series Bewitched, The Brady Bunch, Love, American Style and the TV movies Once an Eagle (1976), Homeward Bound (1980 TV movie), The Children Nobody Wanted (1981), Sadat (1983), Silence of the Heart (1984), Rockabye (1986), I'll Take Manhattan (1987),Leona Helmsley: The Queen of Mean (1990) (Suzanne Pleshette was nominated for an Emmy and a Golden Globe for her portrayal of Leona Helmsley), Father and Scout (1994).

== Personal life ==
=== Marriages ===
Michaels was married three times. His first was to Toby Michaels from 1959 to 1962. His second marriage was to actress Kristina Hansen in 1964; they divorced in 1972. In 1986 he married Judith Penrod; they currently reside in Makena, Hawaii.

==== Relationship with Elizabeth Montgomery ====
Michaels was one of the directors of the television series Bewitched during the 1960s and early 1970s. Elizabeth Montgomery starred in the series, and her husband, William Asher, served as producer. Biographer Herbie J. Pilato wrote that Asher had been unfaithful to Montgomery throughout their marriage and into the final years of Bewitched, and attributed Montgomery's subsequent two-year relationship with Michaels to that history. During the show's final season in 1971–72, Montgomery and Michaels, friends and working partners since 1964, began a romantic relationship and later lived together. According to Pilato, the relationship contributed to the end of both marriages. Bewitched ended in 1972 after Montgomery declined ABC's offer of a ninth-season renewal. Michaels publicly acknowledged the relationship in a 2006 Entertainment Tonight interview, saying it was difficult to end but that the two parted on good terms.

=== Children ===
Michaels had a son, Gregory Michaels, and a daughter, Meredith Michaels-Beerbaum, with Hansen. Michaels-Beerbaum was born on December 26, 1969, and is an Olympic equestrian who lives in Germany. She won team bronze in Rio in 2016.
