= Sharpshooter (2007 film) =

- Genre: Action
- Written by: Steven H. Berman
- Directed by: Armand Mastroianni
- Starring: James Remar; Mario Van Peebles; Catherine Mary Stewart; Bruce Boxleitner
- Music by: Emilio Kauderer
- Country of origin: United States
- Original language: English

Production
- Executive producers: Robert Halmi Jr.; Larry Levinson
- Producers: Kyle A. Clark; James Wilberger
- Cinematography: Dane Peterson
- Editor: Jennifer Jean Cacavas
- Running time: 89 minutes
- Production companies: RHI Entertainment; Alpine Medien Productions; Larry Levinson Productions

Original release
- Network: Spike TV
- Release: October 11, 2007

Sharpshooter is a 2007 American action television film starring James Remar, Bruce Boxleitner, Mario Van Peebles and Catherine Mary Stewart. It was written by Steven H. Berman and directed by Armand Mastroianni. It was first shown in the United Kingdom on Sky Three on October 11, 2007, and aired in the United States on Spike TV on January 27, 2008.

== Plot ==
An assassin working for the CIA decides to take one final job before quitting, only to find out that he is the target of his CIA boss.

== Cast ==
- James Remar as Dillon
- Mario Van Peebles as Flick
- Catherine Mary Stewart as Amy
- Bruce Boxleitner as Sheriff Gardner
- Al Sapienza as Phillips
- McKinley Freeman as Andre
