= Rockabye (1986 film) =

- Genre: Drama
- Based on: Rockabye by Laird Koenig
- Screenplay by: Laird Koenig
- Directed by: Richard Michaels
- Starring: Valerie Bertinelli; Rachel Ticotin; Jason Alexander; Jimmy Smits
- Music by: Charles Bernstein
- Country of origin: United States
- Original language: English

Production
- Executive producers: Roger Gimbel; Freyda Rothstein
- Producers: Jack Grossbart; Marty Litke
- Production locations: New York City; Toronto
- Cinematography: John Lindley
- Editor: Jim Benson
- Running time: 120 minutes
- Production companies: Roger Gimbel Productions; Bertinelli Productions; Peregrine Entertainment Ltd.

Original release
- Network: CBS
- Release: January 12, 1986

Rockabye is a 1986 made-for-TV crime drama film, directed by Richard Michaels and starring Valerie Bertinelli, Rachel Ticotin, Jason Alexander, and Jimmy Smits.

== Plot ==
Stranded in New York City due to missing a bus caused by a delay of a plane, recently divorced mother Susannah Bartok (Valerie Bertinelli) is attacked and maced outside Macy's in Manhattan, and her 2-year-old son gets kidnapped. After she unsuccessfully pleads to the police, who feel indifferent about the case, newspaper reporter Victoria Garcia (Rachel Ticotin) helps the young mother in finding her son.

Susannah, desperate to find her son, initially rejects Victoria's help because she is realistic about the possible fate of her boy, though convinced that the police are not doing their job quickly enough, she allows Victoria's help. Victoria redirects Susannah to a psychic called Christopher Zellner (Roderick Cook), who believes that her son Sonny is dead, but talks about `a dark place' and `box'. Susannah refuses to believe him, and continues her intense and exhausting search. After putting a photo of her son in the newspaper, several 'witnesses' report to the police, but they are all frauds, annoying Lt. Ernest Foy (Jason Alexander).

During their search, they get a tip off that an adoption agency called Sterling is involved of which Victoria has her actor friend pose as Susannah's husband with Susannah posing as a desperate women wanting a child hinting 'they have money' after being told the wait list is 6 months. When Malcolm Sterling dismisses them, he nods to his secretary whom finds Susannah in the ladies room suggesting she could help for $25,000 ($5,000 upfront). Victoria shares their findings with her newspaper editor whom reluctantly agrees to loan the money. When meeting the secretary in the park, Susannah hands over the $5000 and is told to wait. Another women with a stroller then strolls by with a message for Susannah to bring the rest of the money in the stroller in 2 days and leaves. Susannah with Victoria waiting in a cab follow her as she gets into a black car. They discover an underground black market ring, selling young children. At the very last minute, she discovers their operation inside a box company warehouse. She and Victoria tiptoe in to see what they find and make their way upstairs and decide to split up. The ringleader Enrique and the woman who kidnapped Sonny are there. Enrique wrestles with Victoria until she screams and Susannah comes running. Enrique throws Victoria to her death down an elevator shaft as she lets slip the police know what they're doing and are on their way. Susannah rushes downstairs and finds Victoria dead at the bottom of the shaft, she opens Victoria's handbag and grabs her gun. Susannah heads back upstairs. By then, the women has already left with Sonny but Susannah finds Enrique. He tells her that she's too late, that the boy has already been sold and is on his way to Madrid, flying out at 7:15. As Susannah looks at her watch, he throws the laundry at her and tries to wrestle the gun out of her hands. It goes off, fatally wounding him. She leaves him there and goes outside to a phone booth as the other kidnappers have escaped to the airport with Sonny.

She goes outside and after unsuccessfully trying to raise Lt. Foy or Lt. Cooper, and unsuccessfully trying to raise security personnel at the airline, she stops a cab out front and makes the harrowing and sometime high speed journey to JFK. Once inside, she brandishes the gun again, after which the airline manager pretends to call in and stop the flight. They do however allow her clear space to get to the gate where the plane is taking off, but of course she has to relinquish the gun to pass through security. Once devoid of the weapon, police place her in a hold where she becomes even more hysterical after seeing the woman who kidnapped the baby in the first place.

She pretends to be a psychiatrist, claiming Susannah is her patient and needs to be brought back to the hospital. Seeing a copy of the newspaper, she snatches it up and shows it to the men holding her insisting that the story is true. The kidnapper continues her ruse that she's a psychiatrist, but eventually the manager lets her through and sends the police to hold the kidnapper instead.

Moments later Susannah and Sonny are reunited and the other woman holding him is also arrested and we freeze frame over the end credits.

== Cast ==
- Valerie Bertinelli as Susannah Bartok
- Rachel Ticotin as Victoria Garcia
- Jason Alexander as Lt. Ernest Foy
- Ray Baker as Donald F. Donald
- Roderick Cook as Christopher Zellner
- Jonathan Raskin as Sonny
