= Split Image (film) =

- Theatrical release poster
- Directed by: Ted Kotcheff
- Screenplay by: Scott Spencer; Robert Kaufman; Robert Mark Kamen
- Story by: Scott Spencer
- Produced by: Don Carmody; Ted Kotcheff; Jeff Young
- Starring: Michael O'Keefe; Karen Allen; Peter Fonda; James Woods; Elizabeth Ashley; Brian Dennehy; Ronnie Scribner
- Cinematography: Robert C. Jessup
- Music by: Bill Conti
- Production company: PolyGram Pictures
- Distributed by: Orion Pictures
- Release date: October 3, 1982
- Running time: 111 minutes
- Countries: Canada; United States
- Language: English
- Budget: $8 million
- Box office: $263,635

Split Image (also known as Captured) is a 1982 American drama film directed by Ted Kotcheff and starring Michael O'Keefe, Karen Allen, Peter Fonda, James Woods, Elizabeth Ashley, Brian Dennehy and Ronnie Scribner. It tells the story of an all-American college athlete who becomes involved in a youth-oriented cult, and his family's struggle to bring him home.

== Synopsis ==
Danny Stetson is a clean-cut, American college student and gymnast with dreams of Olympic gold when he's lured into "Homeland", a youth-oriented religious commune, by a compelling girl that attracts him, Rebecca. Here he is programmed by the charismatic leader, Neil Kirklander, to believe that his new life now has the true meaning that it previously lacked.

Anguished by their son's disappearance, Danny's parents Diana and Kevin hire a modern-day bounty hunter, Charles Pratt, to abduct Danny and exorcise his brainwashed mind, but the psychological change could be traumatizing.

== Cast ==
Actor	Role
Michael O'Keefe	Danny Stetson / Joshua
Karen Allen	Rebecca / Amy
Peter Fonda	Neil Kirklander
James Woods	Charles Pratt
Elizabeth Ashley	Diana Stetson
Brian Dennehy	Kevin Stetson
Ronnie Scribner	Sean Stetson
Pamela Ludwig	Jane
John Dukakis	Aaron / Bryan
Lee Montgomery	Walter
Michael Sacks	Gabriel
Deborah Rush	Judith
Peter Horton	Jacob
Ken Farmer	Collins
Cliff Stephens	Hall
Brian Henson	Jerry
David Wallace	Gymnast
Kenneth Barry	Big Wig
Robert A. Cowan	Coach 1
Herbert Kirkpatrick	Coach 2
Chris McCarty	Sentry 1
Lee Ritchey	Sentry 2
Lynette Walden	Sexy Girl
Robert Hibbard	Cop
Scott Campbell	Barry Mills
Melanie Strange	Debbie Cooper
Dave Tanner	Guitar Player
Tom Rayhall	Sargent
Jeanne Evans	Newsboy's Mom
Irma P. Hall	Maid
Bill Engvall	Student
Peter Hans Sprague	Person
John Carroll	Homelander
Haley McLane	Homelander
Kelly Wimberly	Homelander

== Production ==
Ted Kotcheff said the film began when Peter Guber, then head of Polygram, approached him to make a movie about cults. Kotcheff was enthusiastic and worked on the film for two years.

The film was originally written by Scott Spencer, whose novel Endless Love had been filmed by Polygram. Spencer was replaced by Larry Gross, then Robert Kaufmann. "I was never actually fired," said Spencer. "The phone calls just stopped coming."

Kotcheff said, "I did a lot of research and spoke to a lot of people who had been in cults. Most of them felt that society had become too materialistic and too crass. They wanted something beyond that and more spiritual. I like that film a lot."

Kotcheff said he cast Peter Fonda because "I wanted all his 60s resonances brought to his character."

The film was originally known as Captured. Filming took place in May 1981 in Dallas, Texas. Tatum O'Neal was originally cast in the film but she had to be let go as she was seventeen years old and not able to work night scenes, which the film required. She was replaced by Karen Allen, who was ten years older than O'Neal, requiring a rewrite of the script.

== Reception ==
Kotcheff said "the film disappeared practically without a trace. It's a subject that American people don't want to hear about."

== Awards ==
In 1982, Ronnie Scribner was nominated in the Category of Best Supporting Young Actor in a Motion Picture at the Youth In Film Award (now known as the Young Artist Award).
