= Kenny Rogers as The Gambler =

1980 TV film

- Genre: Western
- Written by: Jim Byrnes; Cort Casady
- Screenplay by: Jim Byrnes
- Directed by: Dick Lowry
- Starring: Kenny Rogers
- Theme music composer: Larry Cansler
- Country of origin: United States
- Original language: English

Production
- Producer: Jim Byrnes
- Cinematography: Joseph F. Biroc
- Editor: Jerrold L. Ludwig
- Running time: 95 minutes
- Production company: Ken Kragen Productions

Original release
- Network: CBS
- Release: April 8, 1980

Related
- Kenny Rogers as The Gambler: The Adventure Continues

Kenny Rogers as The Gambler (also known as The Gambler) is a 1980 American Western television film directed by Dick Lowry. The film premiered on CBS on April 8, 1980. It was loosely based on the Grammy-winning Kenny Rogers song of the same name, and stars the singer as Brady Hawkes, a gambler trying to reunite with a son he never knew, played by Ronnie Scribner. It was a critical and commercial success, receiving an Eddie Award and two Emmy nominations, and resulting in four sequels.

== Plot ==
Gambler Brady Hawkes receives a letter from Jeremiah, the young son he never knew, who asks Hawkes to help him and his mother Eliza; the two are living in Yuma with Jeremiah's stepfather, an abusive casino owner named Rufe Bennett. Hawkes embarks on a train in El Paso, Texas on a journey to meet him. Along the way, he meets young poker player Billy Montana. Hawkes saves Montana from two belligerent cheaters and the two become friends. Montana fancies himself as a professional player, and is headed to San Francisco for an international poker tournament. Although Montana makes mistakes along the way, Hawkes makes sure that he stays on good behavior during the train ride. The duo help Jennie Reed, a former prostitute who has trouble with a train baron. At the end, they confront Bennett in a gunfight.

== Cast ==
- Kenny Rogers as Brady Hawkes
- Christine Belford as Eliza
- Ronnie Scribner as Jeremiah
- Bruce Boxleitner as Billy Montana
- Lee Purcell as Jennie Reed
- Clu Gulager as Rufe Bennett
- Lance LeGault as Doc Palmer
- Harold Gould as Arthur Stobridge

== Production ==
Dick Lowry served as the director—The Gambler was one of his early works. The film was produced by Kragen & Company, one of their earliest ventures. The company had earlier produced two TV specials with Rogers. It was Kenny Rogers's first starring role.

Despite the film being destined for television, the film was shot on 35mm film like many movies and TV shows of the time.

One of the shooting locations was the ranch headquarters area overlooking the Valle Grande valley, part of Valles Caldera in northern New Mexico.

== Release and reception ==
Kenny Rogers as The Gambler was first aired on CBS on April 8, 1980. The film was a big ratings success and received the Eddie Award for Best Edited Television Special, as well as two Emmy nominations: Outstanding Cinematography for a Limited Series or Special and Outstanding Film Editing for a Limited Series or a Special. The film spawned a franchise, four sequels having been filmed over the course of the following 15 years.

The film was released on DVD in the United States on May 2, 2006, part of a box set with Kenny Rogers as The Gambler: The Adventure Continues and Kenny Rogers as The Gambler, Part III: The Legend Continues. A region-A Blu-ray release by Timeless Media Group followed on November 5, 2013. The Blu-ray release was praised for audio and video quality, but criticized for lack of bonus content.

Ian Jane, writing for DVD Talk in retrospective, gave the film 3.5 out of 5 stars. He thought that the film had aged over the years, but that it is "better than [one] might expect", crediting Rogers's charisma and Lowry's direction. Casey Broadwater for Blu-ray.com called it a film "you tend to like in spite of itself."
