= Kris Kamm =

American actor

- Born: November 29, 1964 (age 60); Evanston, Illinois, U.S.
- Occupation: Actor
- Years active: 1987–present

Kris Kamm (born November 29, 1964) is an American actor, most recognizable from his role as Stuart Rosebrock in the sitcom Coach.

Kamm was born in Evanston, Illinois. His first acting roles were small parts on television shows. He has appeared on such television series as Murder, She Wrote; Married... with Children; and 21 Jump Street. His most famous work was as Stuart Rosebrock on Coach. He left the show to pursue other acting interests but returned for the final episode. After Coach, Kamm continued to work in small roles in television. He appeared in such films as The Heroes of Desert Storm, When the Party's Over and Wyatt Earp.

== Filmography ==
Year	Title	Role	Notes
1987	CBS Schoolbreak Special	Bart	Episode: "An Enemy Among Us"
1987	Married... with Children	Brian	Episode: "How Do You Spell Revenge?"
1988	Shattered Innocence	Cory Parker	TV movie
1988	21 Jump Street	Jimmy Toushak	Episode: "School's Out"
1988	Elvira, Mistress of the Dark	Randy	
1988	Simon & Simon	Matt	Episode: "Simon & Simon Jr."
1989	Paradise	Cole	Episode: "Crossroads"
1989–92	Coach	Stuart Rosebrock	45 episodes
1989	CBS Summer Playhouse	George Bergen	Episode: "Elysian Fields"
1989	Quantum Leap	Chris Stone	Episode: "Disco Inferno - April 1, 1976"
1991	Frame Up	Jack Marsh	
1991	Born to Ride	Bobby Novak	
1991	The Heroes of Desert Storm	Pvt. Stephen Shaefer	TV movie
1992	Murder, She Wrote	Teddy Graves	Episode: "The Dead File"
1993	When the Party's Over	Banks	
1993	In the Line of Duty: Ambush in Waco		TV movie
1994	Wyatt Earp	Billy Claiborne	
1994	Gambler V: Playing for Keeps	Jeremiah Hawkes	TV movie
1996	Andersonville	2nd Wisconsin Soldier	TV movie
1998	Beyond Belief: Fact or Fiction	Officer Sams	Episode: "The Wall/The Chalkboard/The Getaway/The Prescription/Summer Camp"
1998	Winchell	Reporter #2	TV movie
2000	Lost in the Pershing Point Hotel	Cotton Pine	
2000	Cover Me	Phil Romy	Episode: "Killing Me Softly"
2000	Cursed Part 3		Short film
2005	World on Fire	Xander	Also co-producer
