= Stephen Anderson (artist) =

American animator and voice actor

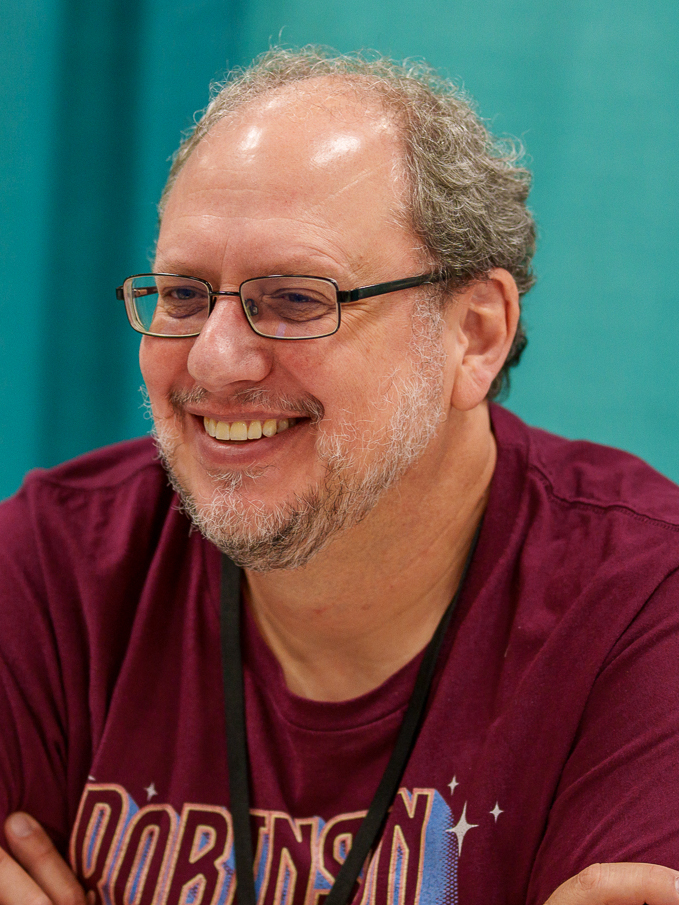
- Anderson at Animate! Columbus in 2025
- Occupations: Animator, voice actor
- Years active: 1991–present
- Employer: Walt Disney Animation Studios (1995–present)
- Notable work: Meet the Robinsons; Winnie the Pooh
- Spouse: Heather Anderson (m. 1993)
- Children: 1

Stephen Anderson is an American animator and voice actor working for Walt Disney Animation Studios.

== Career ==
Anderson joined Walt Disney Animation Studios in 1999 as a story artist on Tarzan. Prior to joining Disney, Anderson worked as an animator at Hyperion Animation on Rover Dangerfield and Bebe's Kids.

Following Tarzan, Anderson served as a head of story for The Emperor's New Groove and Brother Bear. Anderson made his directorial debut with the 2007 film Meet the Robinsons and later directed the 2011 film Winnie the Pooh with Don Hall. After the release of Meet the Robinsons he pitched an idea for a feature called The Earth and the Sky, which would have been The Fox and the Hound with a boy and a dragon. But when DreamWorks announced their movie How to Train Your Dragon, which had similar story elements, the idea was dropped.

Anderson currently resides in Canyon Country, California, with his wife, Heather, and their son, Jacob.

== Credits ==
=== Feature films ===
Year	Film	Credited as						
Year	Film	Director	Writer	Head of Story	Story Artist	Other	Voice Role	Notes
1991	Rover Dangerfield	No	No	No	No	Yes		Additional Animator
1992	Bebe's Kids	No	No	No	No	Yes		Character Animator
1997	The Brave Little Toaster to the Rescue	No	No	No	Yes	No		Direct-to-video
1998	The Brave Little Toaster Goes to Mars	No	No	No	Yes	No		Direct-to-video
1999	Tarzan	No	No	No	Yes	No		
2000	The Emperor's New Groove	No	No	Yes	No	Yes	Ipi	Additional Story Material
2003	Brother Bear	No	No	Yes	No	No		
2007	Meet the Robinsons	Yes	Yes	No	No	Yes	Bowler Hat Guy /Grandpa Bud Robinson / Tallulah Robinson	Disney Story Trust - uncredited
2008	Bolt	No	No	No	Additional	Yes	Additional Voices	Disney Story Trust - uncredited
2009	The Princess and the Frog	No	No	No	No	Yes		Disney Story Trust - uncredited
2010	Tangled	No	No	No	Additional	Yes		Disney Story Trust - uncredited
2011	Winnie the Pooh	Yes	Story	No	No	Yes		Disney Story Trust - uncredited
2012	Wreck-It Ralph	No	No	No	Additional	Yes		Disney Story Trust - uncredited
2013	Frozen	No	No	No	Additional	Yes	Kai	Disney Story Trust - uncredited
2014	Big Hero 6	No	No	No	No	Yes		Creative Leadership
2016	Zootopia	No	No	No	Additional	Yes		Additional Story, Creative Leadership
2016	Moana	No	No	No	Additional	Yes		Additional Story, Creative Leadership
2018	Ralph Breaks the Internet	No	No	No	No	Yes		Creative Leadership
2019	Frozen II	No	No	No	Additional	Yes	Kai	Additional Story, Creative Leadership
2024	The Garfield Movie	No	No	No	Yes	No		
2025	Zootopia 2	No	No	No	No	Yes		Creative Leadership

==== Short films ====
Year	Title	Director	Writer	Other	Voice Role	Notes
1992	Itsy Bitsy Spider	No	No	Yes		Character Animator
1997	Loose Tooth	No	No	Yes		Animation Story Developer
2016	Sugar	Yes	Yes	No		
2017	Olaf's Frozen Adventure	No	No	Yes	Kai	Featurette
2019	Rift	No	No	Yes		Graphic Artist / Locations
2024	Elmer	Yes	Yes	No		
TBA	Untitled The Princess and the Frog/Tiana Special	Yes	No	No		

=== Video ===
- 1992 – Itsy Bitsy Spider (character animator)
- 1996 – Toto Lost in New York (director, character designer, storyboard artist)
- 1996 – Virtual Oz (character designer)
- 1997 – Journey Beneath the Sea (director)
- 1997 – Underground Adventure (director)

=== Television ===
- 1993 – The Itsy Bitsy Spider (director)
- 2021 – Monsters at Work (supervising director and voice director)
- 2023 – Young Love (animation director)
- 2024 – Ariel (storyboard artist)

=== Comic books ===
- 1996 – Poop Jelly (anthology) – writer/artist for one short story
- 2001 – Short Stack (anthology) – writer/artist for one short story
- 2008 – Who is Rocket Johnson? (anthology) – writer/artist for one short story

== See also ==
- Don Hall, who also works with Anderson on some Disney movies, along with co-directing 2011's Winnie the Pooh.
