= David Newman (composer) =

American composer and conductor (born 1954)

- Born: David Louis Newman; March 11, 1954 (age 72); Los Angeles, California, U.S.
- Genre: Film score
- Occupations: Composer; orchestrator; conductor
- Instruments: Piano; violin
- Years active: 1977–present

David Louis Newman (born March 11, 1954) is an American composer and conductor known particularly for his film scores. In a career spanning more than thirty years, he has composed music for nearly 100 feature films, as well as the 1997 and 1998 versions of the 20th Century Fox fanfare. He received an Academy Award nomination for writing the score to the 1997 film Anastasia, contributing to the Newmans being the most nominated Academy Award extended family, with a collective 92 nominations in various music categories.

== Life and career ==
Newman was born on March 11, 1954, in Los Angeles, California, the son of Mississippi-born Martha Louis (née Montgomery) and Hollywood composer Alfred Newman. His paternal grandparents were Russian Jewish immigrants. He is the older brother of Thomas Newman, Maria Newman and the cousin of Randy Newman, all of whom are also composers. He is also the nephew of composers Lionel Newman and Emil Newman, and first cousin, once removed, of musician Joey Newman. An accomplished violinist, and successful concert conductor, Newman was educated at the University of Southern California. From the late 1970s until the early 1980s he played violin on most of John Williams' L.A. scoring sessions, and credits him for learning much about film-music composition. He also performed on the soundtrack of Jerry Goldsmith's The Swarm.

His first film work was on Tim Burton's short film Frankenweenie in 1984. In 1987, he scored Danny DeVito's Throw Momma from the Train. This was his first collaboration with DeVito, and he went on to score nearly all of his subsequent films, including The War of the Roses (1989), Other People's Money (1991), Hoffa (1992), Matilda (1996) and Death to Smoochy (2002). Newman has also scored the comedies The Flintstones (1994), The Mighty Ducks (1992), The Nutty Professor (1996), Paradise (1991), and Bill & Ted's Excellent Adventure (1989).

Newman's credits during the early years of his career were mostly scoring B-movies such as The Kindred (1987) and The Runestone (1990) before he gradually transitioned to score mostly comedy films during his prime such as Bowfinger (1999), The Freshman (1990), and The Spy Next Door (2010). His score for The Spirit (2008) was a tribute to Mancini's 1950s and 60s neo-noir scores such as Touch of Evil (1958) or Experiment in Terror (1962).

He received an Academy Award nomination for the score to the animated Don Bluth film Anastasia (1997), following his father, who scored the 1956 live-action version. However, he lost to Anne Dudley for The Full Monty. His other scores include Critters, The Phantom, The Brave Little Toaster, Malone, Ice Age, 102 Dalmatians and Serenity, among others.

In 1997, Newman began a four-year stint as the music director for the Sundance Institute, and he has conducted the Los Angeles Philharmonic orchestra on several occasions. That year, he also re-recorded the 20th Century Fox Fanfare that was originally composed by his father Alfred, to coincide with the re-opening of the Newman Scoring Stage at the Fox Studios Lot in LA, which debuted in the aforementioned Anastasia and is still being used today (albeit using the 1998 version).

In February 2007, he was elected president of The Film Music Society.

On May 21, 2009, Newman was honored with the Richard Kirk award at the annual BMI Film & Television Awards. The prestigious award is given annually to a composer who has made significant contributions to film and television music.

Since 2012, Newman has conducted the RSO Vienna orchestra at the annual film music gala concert Hollywood in Vienna which is broadcast on radio and TV.

Newman is an alumnus and Board Member of the American Youth Symphony.

== Filmography ==
=== Film ===
==== 1980s ====
Year	Title	Director	Studio(s)	Notes
1984	Frankenweenie	Tim Burton	Walt Disney Pictures	Short film
1986	Critters	Stephen Herek	New Line Cinema	—N/a
1986	Vendetta	Bruce Logan	Vestron Pictures	—N/a
1987	The Kindred	Stephen Carpenter; Jeffrey Obrow	FM Entertainment	—N/a
1987	My Demon Lover	Charlie Loventhal	New Line Cinema	—N/a
1987	Malone	Harley Cokeliss	Orion Pictures	—N/a
1987	The Brave Little Toaster	Jerry Rees	The Kushner-Locke Company; Hyperion Pictures; Buena Vista Pictures Distribution (US theatrical release); ITC Entertainment (UK theatrical release); Walt Disney Home Video (US video release)	David Newman's first score for an animated film
1987	Throw Momma from the Train	Danny DeVito	Orion Pictures	—N/a
1988	Heathers	Michael Lehmann	New World Pictures	—N/a
1989	Bill & Ted's Excellent Adventure	Stephen Herek	Nelson Entertainment; Interscope Communications; Orion Pictures (US); De Laurentiis Entertainment Group (International)	—N/a
1989	Disorganized Crime	Jim Kouf	Silver Screen Partners IV; Touchstone Pictures	—N/a
1989	Little Monsters	Richard Alan Greenberg	Allied Stars Ltd; Davis Entertainment; Vestron Pictures (original production and distribution company); United Artists (theatrical distribution; Vestron sold the movie to United Artists)	—N/a
1989	Gross Anatomy	Thom Eberhardt	Sandollar Productions; Silver Screen Partners IV; Touchstone Pictures	—N/a
1989	The War of the Roses	Danny DeVito	Gracie Films; 20th Century Fox	—N/a

==== 1990s ====
Year	Title	Director	Studio(s)	Notes
1990	Madhouse	Tom Ropelewski	Orion Pictures	—N/a
1990	Fire Birds	David Green	Touchstone Pictures	—N/a
1990	The Freshman	Andrew Bergman	TriStar Pictures	—N/a
1990	DuckTales the Movie: Treasure of the Lost Lamp	Bob Hathcock	DisneyToon Studios; Walt Disney Pictures	—N/a
1990	Mr. Destiny	James Orr	Silver Screen Partners IV; Touchstone Pictures	—N/a
1990	Meet the Applegates	Michael Lehmann	New World Pictures	—N/a
1991	The Marrying Man	Jerry Rees	Silver Screen Partners IV; Hollywood Pictures	—N/a
1991	Talent for the Game	Robert M. Young	Paramount Pictures	—N/a
1991	Don't Tell Mom the Babysitter's Dead	Stephen Herek	HBO Pictures; Warner Bros. Pictures	—N/a
1991	Bill & Ted's Bogus Journey	Peter Hewitt	Nelson Entertainment; Interscope Communications; Orion Pictures	—N/a
1991	Rover Dangerfield	James L. George; Bob Seeley	Hyperion Pictures; Warner Bros. Pictures	—N/a
1991	Paradise	Mary Agnes Donoghue	Interscope Communications; Touchstone Pictures	—N/a
1991	Other People's Money	Norman Jewison	Warner Bros. Pictures	—N/a
1991	The Runestone	Willard Carroll	Hyperion Pictures; LIVE Entertainment	—N/a
1992	Itsy Bitsy Spider	Matthew O'Callaghan	Hyperion Pictures; Paramount Pictures	Short film
1992	Honeymoon in Vegas	Andrew Bergman	Castle Rock Entertainment; New Line Cinema; Columbia Pictures	—N/a
1992	The Mighty Ducks	Stephen Herek	Avnet-Kerner Productions; Walt Disney Pictures	—N/a
1992	That Night	Craig Bolotin	Le Studio Canal+ Regency Enterprises; Alcor Films; Warner Bros. Pictures	—N/a
1992	Hoffa	Danny DeVito	Le Studio Canal+ Jersey Films; 20th Century Fox	—N/a
1993	The Sandlot	David Mickey Evans	Island World; 20th Century Fox	—N/a
1993	Coneheads	Steve Barron	NBC Films; Paramount Pictures	—N/a
1993	Undercover Blues	Herbert Ross	Metro-Goldwyn-Mayer	—N/a
1994	The Air Up There	Paul Michael Glaser	Nomura Babcock & Brown; Interscope Communications; PolyGram Filmed Entertainment; Hollywood Pictures	—N/a
1994	My Father the Hero	Steve Miner	Touchstone Pictures	—N/a
1994	The Flintstones	Brian Levant	Hanna-Barbera Productions; Amblin Entertainment; Universal Pictures	—N/a
1994	The Cowboy Way	Gregg Champion	Imagine Entertainment; Universal Pictures	—N/a
1994	I Love Trouble	Charles Shyer	Caravan Pictures; Touchstone Pictures	—N/a
1995	Boys on the Side	Herbert Ross	Le Studio Canal+ Regency Enterprises; Warner Bros. Pictures	—N/a
1995	Tommy Boy	Peter Segal	Paramount Pictures	—N/a
1995	Operation Dumbo Drop	Simon Wincer	Interscope Communications; PolyGram Filmed Entertainment; Walt Disney Pictures	—N/a
1996	Big Bully	Steve Miner	Morgan Creek Productions; Warner Bros. Pictures	—N/a
1996	The Phantom	Simon Wincer	The Ladd Company; Village Roadshow Pictures; Paramount Pictures	—N/a
1996	The Nutty Professor	Tom Shadyac	Imagine Entertainment; Universal Pictures	—N/a
1996	Matilda	Danny DeVito	Jersey Films; TriStar Pictures	—N/a
1996	Jingle All the Way	Brian Levant	1492 Pictures; 20th Century Fox	—N/a
1997	Out to Sea	Martha Coolidge	Davis Entertainment; 20th Century Fox	—N/a
1997	Anastasia	Don Bluth; Gary Goldman	20th Century Fox; 20th Century Fox Animation; Fox Animation Studios	—N/a
1999	Never Been Kissed	Raja Gosnell	Fox 2000 Pictures; Flower Films; 20th Century Fox	—N/a
1999	Bowfinger	Frank Oz	Imagine Entertainment; Universal Pictures	—N/a
1999	Brokedown Palace	Jonathan Kaplan	20th Century Fox	—N/a
1999	Galaxy Quest	Dean Parisot	DreamWorks Pictures	—N/a

==== 2000s ====
Year	Title	Director	Studio(s)	Notes
2000	The Flintstones in Viva Rock Vegas	Brian Levant	Hanna-Barbera Productions; Amblin Entertainment; Universal Pictures	—N/a
2000	Nutty Professor II: The Klumps	Peter Segal	Imagine Entertainment; Universal Pictures	—N/a
2000	Duets	Bruce Paltrow	Hollywood Pictures	—N/a
2000	Bedazzled	Harold Ramis	Regency Enterprises; 20th Century Fox	—N/a
2000	102 Dalmatians	Kevin Lima	Walt Disney Pictures	—N/a
2001	The Flamingo Rising	Martha Coolidge	CBS; Hallmark Hall of Fame	Television film
2001	Lost Soul	David Mickey Evans	Brocita Entertainment (S) Pte Ltd; Onetree Pictures; United International Pictures	—N/a
2001	Dr. Dolittle 2	Steve Carr	Davis Entertainment; 20th Century Fox	—N/a
2001	The Affair of the Necklace	Charles Shyer	Alcon Entertainment; Warner Bros. Pictures	—N/a
2002	Ice Age	Chris Wedge	Blue Sky Studios; 20th Century Fox Animation; 20th Century Fox	—N/a
2002	Death to Smoochy	Danny DeVito	Jersey Films; Film4; Warner Bros. Pictures	—N/a
2002	Life or Something Like It	Stephen Herek	Regency Enterprises; Davis Entertainment; 20th Century Fox	—N/a
2002	Scooby-Doo	Raja Gosnell	Atlas Entertainment; Warner Bros. Pictures	—N/a
2003	How to Lose a Guy in 10 Days	Donald Petrie	Paramount Pictures	—N/a
2003	Daddy Day Care	Steve Carr	Revolution Studios; Davis Entertainment; Columbia Pictures	—N/a
2003	Duplex	Danny DeVito	Flower Films; Red Hour Productions; FilmColony; Miramax Films	—N/a
2003	The Cat in the Hat	Bo Welch	Imagine Entertainment; Universal Pictures (North America); DreamWorks Pictures (International)	Replaced Marc Shaiman
2004	Scooby-Doo 2: Monsters Unleashed	Raja Gosnell	Warner Bros. Pictures	—N/a
2005	Are We There Yet?	Brian Levant	Revolution Studios; Columbia Pictures	—N/a
2005	Man of the House	Stephen Herek	Bel Air Entertainment; Revolution Studios; Columbia Pictures	—N/a
2005	Monster-in-Law	Robert Luketic	Allied Stars Ltd; New Line Cinema	—N/a
2005	Serenity	Joss Whedon	Universal Pictures	—N/a
2007	Norbit	Brian Robbins	Tollin/Robbins Productions; Davis Entertainment; DreamWorks Pictures; Paramount Pictures	—N/a
2008	Welcome Home, Roscoe Jenkins	Malcolm D. Lee	Spyglass Entertainment; Universal Pictures	—N/a
2008	The Spirit	Frank Miller	OddLot Entertainment; Lionsgate	—N/a
2009	My Life in Ruins	Donald Petrie	Playtone; Echo Bridge Entertainment; Fox Searchlight Pictures	—N/a
2009	Scooby-Doo! The Mystery Begins	Brian Levant	Cartoon Network; Warner Premiere	Television film
2009	Alvin and the Chipmunks: The Squeakquel	Betty Thomas	Bagdasarian Productions; Dune Entertainment; Regency Enterprises; 20th Century Fox	—N/a

==== 2010s ====
Year	Title	Director	Studio(s)	Notes
2010	Crazy on the Outside	Tim Allen	Freestyle Releasing	—N/a
2010	The Spy Next Door	Brian Levant	Relativity Media; Lionsgate	—N/a
2010	Animals United	Reinhard Klooss; Holger Tappe	Ambient Entertainment; Constantin Film	—N/a
2010	Scooby-Doo! Curse of the Lake Monster	Brian Levant	Atlas Entertainment; Warner Premiere	Television film
2011	Big Mommas: Like Father, Like Son	John Whitesell	Regency Enterprises; 20th Century Fox	—N/a
2012	A Christmas Story 2	Brian Levant	Warner Premiere; Warner Bros. Pictures	Direct-to-video film
2013	Tarzan	Reinhard Klooss	Ambient Entertainment; Constantin Film	—N/a
2014	Behaving Badly	Tim Garrick	Vertical Entertainment	—N/a
2014	5 Flights Up	Richard Loncraine	Focus World	—N/a
2016	Army of One	Larry Charles	Conde Nast Entertainment; Endgame Entertainment; Kasbah-Film Tanger	
2017	Girls Trip	Malcolm D. Lee	Universal Pictures; Will Packer Productions	—N/a
2017	Naked	Michael Tiddes	Netflix; Wayans Alvarez Productions	—N/a
2018	Night School	Malcolm D. Lee	Universal Pictures	—N/a
2019	Pets United	Reinhard Klooss	Netflix	—N/a

==== 2020s ====
Year	Title	Director	Studio(s)	Notes
2021	West Side Story	Steven Spielberg	20th Century Studios; Amblin Entertainment	As arranger and adapter. Original themes and songs by Leonard Bernstein. Fifth Steven Spielberg film without his long-time collaborator, John Williams, since Twilight Zone: The Movie (1983), The Color Purple (1985), Bridge of Spies (2015) and Ready Player One (2018). Second Spielberg film to be scored by a Newman family member after Bridge of Spies, which was composed by Thomas Newman, David's younger brother.
2024	Arthur's Whisky	Stephen Cookson	Sky Cinema	—N/a
2025	The Wizard of Oz at Sphere	Victor Fleming	Sphere Studios; Warner Bros. Pictures	As conductor. Original themes by Herbert Stothart and songs by Harold Arlen and Yip Harburg. Immersive version of the 1939 MGM film.

=== Television ===
Year	Title	Creator	Studio(s)	Notes
2019-2022	Green Eggs and Ham	Jared Stern	Gulfstream Pictures; A Stern Talking To; A Very Good Production; Warner Bros. Animation; Netflix	Newman's first score for an animated series
