= Itsy Bitsy Spider (disambiguation) =

"Itsy Bitsy Spider" is a nursery rhyme.

Itsy Bitsy Spider may also refer to:

- Itsy Bitsy Spider (film), a 1992 animated short film
- Itsy Bitsy (film), a 2019 horror film
- The Itsy Bitsy Spider (TV series), an animated series based on the 1992 short film

== Music ==
- "Itzy Bitzy Spider" (Aqua song), a 1995 song by Joyspeed (later known as Aqua)
- "Itsy Bitsy Spider" (EliZe song)
- "Itsy Bitsy Spider", song sampled on and recorded alongside "Coming Around Again"

== See also ==
- Itsy Bitsy (character), a Marvel Comics supervillain
- "Itsy Bitsy Spider", a short story by James Patrick Kelly
