= Jerry Rapp =

American screenwriter and producer

Jerry Rapp is a screenwriter, director, and producer. Rapp is a graduate of the USC School of Cinema/Television, and has been working as a professional screenwriter, director, and producer since 1987. In addition, Rapp works as a full-time script doctor and ghost writer, and has worked on and/or revised well over a hundred screenplays for studios and individuals.

== Career ==
Rapp's first screenplay, On The Air, was acquired by Imagine Entertainment, and led to a number of other script sales, including a second picture for Imagine, Tourists, Wishing for Paramount, Foster's Kids for Universal, Guilty of Suspicion for MGM, and Richie Rich Goes Public for HEG. He also wrote and produced the feature film, Sand Trap, which aired on HBO.

Rapp's first credited work was co-screenwriter of the 1992 animated short film Itsy Bitsy Spider, which served as the pilot episode for the eponymous television series on USA Network. Later television credits include episodes of Wishbone for PBS, The Mask for New Line TV, Tales From the Crypt and Monsters. Rapp wrote and directed the indie feature, The Thing at Pete and Julie’s, the documentary Sound Magic, and, either alone or collaborating, has written, directed and produced a number of films which have played in various festivals, including the R&H Educational Film Series for Hypnotic, with Daedalus Howell, which aired on Showtime, as well as British comedy channels.

Rapp wrote the 2003 film Moving Alan, which played in several festivals and garnered a number of awards.

Rapp wrote and co-produced the 2006 film Mojave Phone Booth.

Rapp wrote and produced the 2018 feature film Looking Glass, starring Nicolas Cage.
