= Hugh Maguire =

Hugh Maguire may refer to:

- Hugh Maguire (Lord of Fermanagh) (died 1600), Lord of Fermanagh in Ireland during the reign of Elizabeth I
- Hugh Maguire (athlete) (1887–1967), American runner; see Athletics at the 1912 Summer Olympics – Men's 10,000 metres
- Hugh Maguire (violinist) (1926–2013), Irish violinist and concertmaster
- Hugh Maguire (actor), American film and television actor
