= The Adventures of Tom Thumb and Thumbelina =

2002 animated film by Glenn Chaika

- Film poster
- Directed by: Glenn Chaika
- Written by: Willard Carroll
- Based on: Thumbelina by Hans Christian Andersen
- Produced by: Kurt Albrecht; Elizabeth Dreyer; Andrew Herwitz; John Lanza; Mercedes J. Sichon; Thomas L. Wilhite
- Starring: Jennifer Love Hewitt; Elijah Wood; Peter Gallagher; Jon Stewart
- Music by: William Finn; Randall Crissman
- Production companies: Miramax Home Entertainment; Hyperion Animation
- Distributed by: Buena Vista Home Entertainment
- Release date: August 6, 2002
- Running time: 74 minutes
- Country: United States
- Language: English
- Box office: €23,531 (Italy)

The Adventures of Tom Thumb and Thumbelina is a 2002 American animated fantasy film directed by Glenn Chaika and starring Jennifer Love Hewitt, Elijah Wood, Peter Gallagher, and Jon Stewart. Produced by Hyperion Animation, the film was distributed by Buena Vista Home Entertainment under the Miramax Home Entertainment label 2002 in VHS & DVD Estados Unidos / 2004 in VHS & DVD Mexican.

== Plot ==
As a baby, the tiny Thumbelina (Jennifer Love Hewitt) is kidnapped and forced to perform in the circus. Although she is very popular with the audience, she is incredibly unhappy and lonely, wishing for someone like her she can love. She escapes the circus to find others of her kind. She happens upon Tom Thumb (Elijah Wood), who was raised by a good normal-sized man. He is not only similar to her in size, but is also looking for others like him. But just as they fall in love, Thumbelina is taken prisoner by the terribly sinister Mole King (Peter Gallagher), who wants to make her his bride. Thumbelina is the daughter of King and Queen of Gemworld.

== Voice Cast ==
- Jennifer Love Hewitt as Thumbelina
- Elijah Wood as Tom Thumb
  - Brad Kane as singing voice of Tom Thumb
- Peter Gallagher as Mole King
- Jon Stewart as Godfrey
- Rachel Griffiths as Albertine Sparrow
- Robert Guillaume as Ben
- Jane Leeves as Margaret Beetle
- Alexandra Boyd as Bertha Beetle
- Emma Samms as Shelley Beetle
- Esai Morales as Vergas Mouse
- Yvette Freeman as Leola Mouse
- Michael Chiklis as Roman. King Webster, Thumbelina's Father
- Bebe Neuwirth as Thumbelina's Mother
- Yul Vazquez as Gibson Mouse
- Jack Johnson as The Bug Collector
- John Patrick White as Daniel

== Release ==
The film is copyrighted 1999 but was not released on home media until 2002. It was distributed internationally to Italy, where it debuted on 75 screens in 2004, earning €23,531 in its initial week of release.

== Reception ==
Kevin Lee of DVD Verdict found the film "guilty", writing "Walt Disney is being held in contempt of this court for The Adventures of Tom Thumb and Thumbelina. This is simply not up to the usual standards of the Mouse House." Brian Costello of Common Sense Media gave the film four stars out of five, saying the film is "a fun tale with enough constant action and snappy dialogue to keep both children and adults entertained."

=== Awards ===
The Adventures of Tom Thumb and Thumbelina won a 2003 Golden Reel Award for Best Sound Editing in the Direct to Video category. In addition, the film was nominated for a 2003 DVD Premiere Award (administered by the DVD Exclusive Awards) in the categories of Best Animated Character Performance (Elijah Wood) and Best Animated DVD Premiere Movie.
