= Bill Bolender =

American actor & artist (born 1940)

- Born: November 14, 1940 (age 85); Chicago, Illinois, U.S.
- Occupations: Actor; Artist
- Years active: 1986–present
- Website: billbolender.com

Bill Bolender is an American character actor and artist, mainly known for small appearances in RoboCop 2, JFK, Reality Bites, The Shawshank Redemption, Nixon and Dante's Peak.

His guest starring appearances include roles in The Adventures of Brisco County, Jr.; Walker, Texas Ranger; Star Trek: Deep Space Nine (as an Albino alien in the episode "Blood Oath"); NYPD Blue; Alias; Deadwood; and in the Desperate Housewives episode "No One Is Alone". He also had a recurring role as Captain Ross in JAG.

== Career ==
Bolender played a small but important role in The Shawshank Redemption as Elmo Blatch, the violent convict who Andy Dufresne (played by Tim Robbins) discovers may actually be to blame for the murders of which he was convicted.

Bolender has continued to work as an actor over the past few decades, appearing in the 2018 Nicolas Cage thriller Looking Glass, and in the recurring role of Dean in the Prime Video crime series Bosch (sharing credits with Shawshank co-star Mark Rolston). He appeared in a 2015 episode of the MTV series Faking It and was also a guest-star on an episode of Nickelodeon's Avatar: The Last Airbender as Sha-Mo.

== Personal life ==
Bolender is also a visual artist, having trained at both the Art Institute of Chicago and the San Francisco School of Fine Arts. Samples of his work can be seen on his website, and on his Instagram.

== Filmography ==
=== Motion picture credits ===
Year	Title	Role	Notes
1988	D.O.A.	Nick Lang Sr.	
1988	Paramedics	Dying Man	
1988	It Takes Two	Judd Rogers	
1988	Il nido del ragno	Chancellor Hubbard	
1989	Ninth Life	Ray	
1990	Black Snow	Grimes	
1990	RoboCop 2	Cabbie	
1991	JFK	Prisoner Powell	
1992	Bonnie & Clyde: The True Story	Farmer Jones	
1994	Reality Bites	Truck Driver	
1994	Plughead Rewired: Circuitry Man II	Pvt. Richards	
1994	The Shawshank Redemption	Elmo Blatch	
1995	Things to Do in Denver When You're Dead	Stevie's Dad	
1995	Midnight Man	Randy	
1995	Wild Bill	Bartender at Way Station	
1995	Nixon	Bethesda Doctor	
1996	Infinity	Isadore Rabi	
1997	Dante's Peak	Sheriff Turner	
1998	The Commissioner	Arthur Groom	
1998	Overdrive	Jim Bryant	
1999	The Settlement	Shamansky	
2003	Rose's (aka Confessions of a Florist)	Mr. Matinez	
2018	Looking Glass	Ben	

=== Television credits ===
Year	Title	Role	Notes
1986	Dallas: The Early Years	4th Player	TV movie, Uncredited
1987	Uncle Tom's Cabin	Trader	TV movie
1987	The Man Who Broke 1,000 Chains	Rayford	TV movie
1988	Pancho Barnes	Col. Rand	TV movie
1989	Dream Date	Billie Ray	TV movie
1990	Challenger	Horace Lamberth	TV movie
1991	In Broad Daylight	Frank Snow	TV movie
1991	Final Verdict	Jim Davin	TV movie
1992	Ned Blessing: The True Story of My Life	Twister Taylor	TV movie
1992	Trial: The Price of Passion		TV movie
1993	Jack Reed: Badge of Honor	Stan Howell	TV movie
1993	Fatal Deception: Mrs. Lee Harvey Oswald	George de Mohrenschildt	TV movie
1994	Star Trek: Deep Space Nine	The Albino	1 episode
1995	Suspect Device	Hank	TV movie
1995–1998	JAG	Captain 'Skipper' Ross	5 episodes
1996	Smoke Jumpers	Cranshaw	TV movie
1996	Crime of the Century	English-speaking Pastor	TV movie
1997	Quicksilver Highway	Scooter	TV movie
1997	A Thousand Men and a Baby	Gen. Maxwell Taylor	TV movie
1998	Still Holding On: The Legend of Cadillac Jack	Lenny	TV movie
1999	Hefner: Unauthorized	Glenn Hefner	TV movie
2000	The West Wing	Man #1	1 episode
2001	That's Life	Customer	1 episode
2002	First Monday	Mr. Harley	1 episode
2003–2004	Alias	Oleg Madrczyk	2 episodes
2004	Deadwood	Artie Simpson	1 episode
2005	CSI: Miami	Ralph Windham	1 episode
2005	Surface	Old Man	1 episode
2006	Desperate Housewives	Property Manager	1 episode
2006	Avatar: The Last Airbender	Sha-Mo	1 episode
2007–2008	ER	Hank Riley	2 episodes
2009	Cold Case	Mike 'Monkey' Mack '09	1 episode
2010	Pair of Kings		1 episode
2011	Greek	Televangelist	1 episode
2015	Faking It		1 episode
2016–2017	Bosch	Dean	2 episodes
