= Vanishing on 7th Street =

2010 film directed by Brad Anderson

- Directed by: Brad Anderson
- Written by: Anthony Jaswinski
- Produced by: Norton Herrick; Tove Christensen; Celine Rattray
- Starring: Hayden Christensen; Thandiwe Newton; John Leguizamo; Jacob Latimore
- Cinematography: Uta Briesewitz
- Edited by: Jeffrey Wolf
- Music by: Lucas Vidal
- Production companies: Herrick Entertainment; Mandalay Vision
- Distributed by: Magnet Releasing
- Release dates: September 12, 2010 (Toronto); February 18, 2011 (United States)
- Running time: 92 minutes
- Country: United States
- Language: English
- Box office: $1 million

Vanishing on 7th Street is a 2010 American post-apocalyptic thriller film directed by Brad Anderson and starring Hayden Christensen, Thandiwe Newton and John Leguizamo.

== Plot ==
Paul, a projectionist in a Detroit theater, is reading about the 16th-century disappearance of the Roanoke Colony when the lights suddenly go out. He finds that all the staff and patrons have vanished, leaving only their clothes behind. He comes across a security guard holding a flashlight; as Paul had a headlamp on for his reading, they deduce that people holding sources of light are protected against whatever dwells in the darkness. Upon hearing a sound in a department store, the guard investigates when his flashlight goes out, and he vanishes. As Paul hears the guard cry out, his headlamp also goes out. The scene changes to a hospital where a woman in scrubs, Rosemary, frantically looks for anyone left alive and continuously calls for a child named Manny.

The following morning, TV reporter Luke Ryder wakes to find the power out. Leaving his apartment, the downtown streets are empty except for abandoned cars and piles of clothing. He reaches his television station, also abandoned, and finds a recording that shows his girlfriend vanishing on air when the lights go out. A live feed from Chicago shows a newscaster telling people to always keep a light on themselves.

Three days pass, and Luke is alone in the darkness, trying to scavenge flashlight batteries and checking cars. He finds a bar powered by a portable generator, where the bartender's young son, James Leary, waits alone. James believes his mother is at a church down the street and will soon return. Luke explains that it is 11 a.m. but dark out, implying that the sun no longer provides light.

Luke and James are later joined by Rosemary, who made her way to the bar, thinking her son Manny might have been brought there by his father. On the third day of darkness, Paul appears in the street, suffering from a severe concussion. He reveals that the darkness had taken him, but his headlamp had reactivated, and he reappeared. Paul tells them about the mystery of the Roanoke Colony, where over 100 settlers disappeared overnight, and they seem to be experiencing the same thing. He tells them that the word "CROATOAN" was found carved into a fence post at the site of the empty colony.

With the generator failing and Paul needing medical help, Luke suggests going to Chicago, having seen the live video feed. He and Rosemary go into the street to retrieve one of the abandoned trucks. After their flashlights begin losing power, they return to the hospital for matches and batteries. In the street, Rosemary ignores Luke's warnings that the sound of a baby crying is just the darkness trying to trick her. She is lured under a solitary street light and disappears when the light goes out. Back at the bar, the generator suffers from short circuits, causing the lights to flicker. Having lost sight of James, Paul searches for him in the bunker tunnels below the bar. When the lights fail, James, wearing a glow-stick necklace, is safe, but Paul vanishes.

Luke manages to push a truck back to the bar, and he escapes with James using the generator to start the truck. As they pass the church up the block, James gets out to find his mother. Luke leaves, but returns after seeing the word "CROATOAN" carved into the side of a sign. When Luke exits the truck at the church, the battery dies, the lights go out, and Luke disappears. James cowers in the church under the glow of candles, which slowly start to burn out.

James wakes to daylight and sees the last candle burning all night. A little girl, Briana, appears and urges James to stay with her. She has survived thanks to a solar-powered flashlight, although James is aware that eventually, the sun will no longer provide light, and the flashlight will die.

As they leave the church, they encounter a police horse eating spilled apples on the ground and decide to take it to Chicago. As the sun sets on the children leaving the city, the camera pans to the bar, casting the shadows of Luke, Paul, and Rosemary watching the two leave as the darkness falls. As it gets dark, Briana's light comes on, ensuring their protection against the darkness as they begin their journey.

== Cast ==
- Hayden Christensen as Luke Ryder, a television reporter who becomes the leader of the group while trying to escape.
- Thandiwe Newton as Rosemary, a distraught woman searching for her missing baby (credited as Thandie Newton).
- John Leguizamo as Paul, a cinema projectionist.
- Jacob Latimore as James Leary, an armed 12-year-old whose mother was a bartender at the tavern before she disappeared.
- Taylor Groothuis as Briana
- Jordan Trovillion as Concession girl
- Arthur Cartwright as Security Guard
- Larry Fessenden as Bike Messenger
- Hugh Maguire as Patient

== Production ==
Vanishing on 7th Street is based on a screenplay by Anthony Jaswinski and is produced from Herrick Entertainment. The film is the eighth from director Brad Anderson and features Hayden Christensen, Thandiwe Newton and John Leguizamo in the lead roles. The shooting began on October 12, 2009 in Detroit.

== Soundtrack ==
The score is composed by Spanish song writer and composer Lucas Vidal and is his first theatrical feature film soundtrack, with songs written and executively produced by Howard Herrick.

== Release ==
The film was initially released for the Zune and Xbox Live members prior to its theatrical release. Shown in only six theaters across the United States, Vanishing on 7th Street grossed $22,197. However, it made $1,045,953 outside of the United States.

== Reception ==
Vanishing on 7th Street received mixed reviews. As of June 2020, the film holds a 48% approval rating on Rotten Tomatoes based on 60 reviews, with an average rating of 5.08/10. The Los Angeles Times review states, "Writer Anthony Jaswinski's understated script starts with a belief that to frighten, you don't need to actually show the things that go bump in the night." Critics also found Anderson's work praiseworthy. It was noted that he infused a certain amount of energy and style to the film.

The film also earned criticism as several reviewers noted that it was unable to sustain interest throughout the narrative. While The New York Times, for instance, praised Anderson's direction, it faulted the story for having a promising start only to stumble later, finally culminating with a disappointing ending. A review on The A.V. Club also found the film excessively focused on its bickering characters instead of their escape from the encroaching darkness.

== Sources ==
- McCann, Ben (2013), "Body Horror", in Aston, James; Walliss, John (eds.), To See the Saw Movies: Essays on Torture Porn and Post-9/11 Horror, McFarland & Company, ISBN 978-0786470891
