= Rover Dangerfield =

1991 animated feature film

- Theatrical release poster
- Directed by: James L. George; Bob Seeley
- Screenplay by: Rodney Dangerfield
- Story by: Rodney Dangerfield; Harold Ramis
- Produced by: Willard Carroll; Tom L. Wilhite
- Starring: Rodney Dangerfield
- Edited by: Tony Mizgalski
- Music by: David Newman
- Production companies: Hyperion Animation; The Kushner-Locke Company (uncredited)
- Distributed by: Warner Bros.
- Release date: August 2, 1991
- Running time: 74 minutes
- Country: United States
- Language: English

Rover Dangerfield is a 1991 American animated musical comedy film starring the voice talent of comedian Rodney Dangerfield, who also wrote the screenplay and story and co-produced the film. It revolves around the eponymous character, a canine facsimile of Dangerfield owned by a Las Vegas showgirl, who gets dumped off the Hoover Dam and finds himself living on a farm. Critical reception was unfavorable, although its animation received minor praise.

== Plot ==
Rover Dangerfield is a Basset Hound living the life of luxury in Las Vegas with his owner Connie, a showgirl. One night, he sees Connie's duplicitous boyfriend Rocky negotiating with a pair of gangsters and accidentally disrupts it by dropping a bone into the meeting. Thinking Rocky is an undercover cop setting them up, the gangsters flee as their boss tells Rocky that he has blown his last chance as he claims that it was a "stupid dog" that intruded.

When Connie goes on tour for two weeks, she leaves Rover in the care of Rocky. In retaliation for ruining his deal, Rocky stuffs Rover in a bag, drives him to Hoover Dam and throws him into the water.

The bag is later pulled out of the water by two passing fishermen, who take Rover back to shore and place him in the back of their pickup truck. Rover regains consciousness, jumps out of the truck during a stop, and begins wandering down the road. He ends up in the countryside, and encounters a farmer named Cal and his son Danny. Danny convinces his father to take the dog in. Cal agrees on one condition: if he causes trouble, he will be sent to an animal shelter. Rover has difficulty adjusting to life on the farm but with the help of Daisy, a beautiful collie next door, and the other dogs on the farm, he succeeds in earning their trust. Rover spends Christmas with the family, and begins to fall in love with Daisy.

A pack of wolves attempt to kill a turkey on the farm. Rover saves the turkey, but the bird ends up dead from shock. Cal mistakenly believes Rover to be responsible for the turkey's death, and takes Rover into the woods to shoot him the next morning. The wolves appear and attack Cal, Rover fights off the wolves, and then rallies the other farm dogs to get the injured Cal home.

Rover's heroics make the papers; Connie discovers Rover's whereabouts and travels to the farm to pick him up and take him back to Las Vegas. Although initially satisfied to be reunited with Connie and his old friends, Rover soon begins to miss his life on the farm. Rocky comes into Connie's dressing room, and accidentally confesses to her what he did to Rover, causing Connie to break up with him. Infuriated, Rocky tries to retaliate, but Rover and friends chase him out of the casino, where he is beckoned into the gangsters' limo. When Rocky thanks them he begins to wonder why they happened to be there, the Big Boss (still thinking Rocky is an undercover cop) quotes "This is a set up! Want to see Hoover Dam"? The limo then drives off as Rover waves goodbye.

Sometime later, Rover becomes despondent upon missing Daisy. Understanding that he misses his new life, Connie takes Rover back to the farm to stay, allowing Cal and Danny to keep him. Rover is reunited with Daisy, who leads him to the barn, revealing that he is now a father of six puppies: five of them resembling Rover and one resembling Daisy. The story ends with Rover teaching his kids how to play cards and happily chasing Daisy around the farmyard.

== Voice cast ==
- Rodney Dangerfield as:
  - Rover, a Basset Hound that gets displaced into the countryside
  - Rover's Son
- Susan Boyd as Daisy, a Rough Collie that lives next door to the farm that takes Rover in
- Ronnie Schell as Eddie
- Ned Luke as Raffles, a Border Collie
- Shawn Southwick as Connie, a show girl and owner of Rover
- Dana Hill as Danny, a boy who lives on a farm that takes in Rover
- Sal Landi as Rocky, the duplicitous boyfriend of Connie
- Tom Williams as:
  - A coyote
  - A rooster
- Chris Collins as:
  - Big Boss, an unnamed crime boss that Rocky tries to negotiate with
  - Sparky
  - A horse
  - A coyote
  - A wolf
- Bob Bergen as a gangster that works for the Big Boss
- Paxton Whitehead as Count, a borzoi
- Ron Taylor as:
  - Mugsy, a bulldog
  - Bruno
- Bert Kramer as Max, a German Shepherd
- Eddie Barth as Champ
- Ralph Monaco as a truck driver
- Tress MacNeille as:
  - Queenie
  - Chorus Girls
  - A hen
  - Chickens
  - A turkey that was targeted by the wolves
- Michael Sheehan as:
  - Jose
  - A sheep
- Lara Cody as:
  - Chorus Line
  - Gigi
  - A sheep
- Owen Bush as Fisherman #1
- Kenneth White as Fisherman #2
- Gregg Berger as Cal, a farmer who is the father of Danny
- Dennis Blair as Lem, a coonhound
- Don Stewart as Clem, a coonhound
- Robert Pine as Duke, a bloodhound
- Danny Mann as a wolf
- Bernard Erhard as a wolf

Additional farm animal voices provided by Bob Bergen, Louise Chamis, Bill Farmer, Barbara Goodson, Patricia Parris, Burton Sharp, and Ross Taylor

== Production ==
Conceived in the late 1980s, the film was the brainchild of Rodney Dangerfield, and planned at the time for a December 1988 release. It was originally planned as an R-rated animated film, in the vein of Ralph Bakshi's films, but Warner Bros. Pictures wanted the film's content to be toned down to a G-rating. Initially, the film was set to be directed by animator Steve Moore, who worked alongside Rebecca Rees on further developing the script written by Harold Ramis attributed to Dangerfield. He would soon be initially fired by Dangerfield, who wanted him to produce the script as is with no further revisions. Ultimately, Moore remained on board the project as a sequence director. Ramis left the project not soon long after Moore's demotion. Cartoonist Jeff Smith, best known as the creator of the self-published comic book series Bone, described working on key frames for the film's animation to editor Gary Groth in The Comics Journal in 1994. Although he admitted he had fun working on the film, he would describe the film itself as "terrible".

The film was preceded in theaters by a re-issue of the 1958 Merrie Melodies short Robin Hood Daffy. A newly produced Looney Tunes short, (Blooper) Bunny, was originally intended to accompany Rover Dangerfield in its theatrical release, but that short was shelved due to what Warners considered irreverent satirical content (some of it aimed at the studio).

== Reception and legacy ==
On the review aggregator website Rotten Tomatoes, 17% of 6 critics' reviews are positive, with an average rating of 3.8/10.

Entertainment Weekly graded the film a 'C', questioning Dangerfield's decision to make the film and said, 'Dangerfield should have known he had written a no-win scenario. His strongest suit — that gleeful lounge-act vulgarity — has always been a little too crass for kids. Yet when Rover offers gooey, sentimental life lessons, it feels unconvincing, like a rock star in a suit. This mongrel-movie badly wants to be a kidvid hit, and with that star and decent animation chops, it stands a chance. But don't bet the farm on it.' TV Guide awarded the film two stars, criticizing the tone and inconsistent animation, and said, 'The result is a confused hybrid creation, suspended in a twilight zone between Don Bluth's benign but dull children's fare and Ralph Bakshi's gratingly hip work.'

Screen Rant, on the other hand, listed Rover Dangerfield as a must-see performance for its star, stating that:

"To hear Dangerfield voice an animated version of himself is quite funny, and the film, while no classic, is completely watchable due to Dangerfield's fresh and entertaining voice-performance".

== Home video ==
The film was released on VHS and LaserDisc on February 12, 1992. Warner Archive Collection released the film on DVD, and Blu-ray on January 30, 2024.

== In popular culture ==
Rover Dangerfield appears in a pound in the Family Guy episode "The Woof of Wall Street".

== See also ==
- List of American films of 1991
- List of animated feature films
