= Tom's Midnight Garden (film) =

1999 film by Willard Carroll

- Directed by: Willard Carroll
- Written by: Willard Carroll
- Based on: Tom's Midnight Garden by Philippa Pearce
- Starring: Joan Plowright; Anthony Way; Greta Scacchi; Florence Hoath
- Music by: Debbie Wiseman
- Production companies: Hyperion Pictures; Isle of Man Film; Vine International Pictures
- Distributed by: Downtown Pictures Ltd. (United Kingdom)
- Release dates: 15 May 1999 (Seattle International Film Festival); 7 April 2000 (United States); 13 October 2000 (United Kingdom)
- Countries: United Kingdom; United States; Japan

Tom's Midnight Garden is a 1999 British-American family fantasy film directed by Willard Carroll and starring Nigel Le Vaillant, Marlene Sidaway and Serena Gordon. The screenplay (by Willard Carroll) concerns a boy who discovers a secret garden. The film was based on the novel Tom's Midnight Garden by Philippa Pearce, and filmed at Chenies Manor House in Buckinghamshire. The film was produced by Hyperion Pictures.

== Premise ==
After going to stay with his uncle, a boy is disappointed that he doesn't have a garden he can play in. However, he discovers a secret garden that only appears in the middle of the night.

== Plot ==
When Tom Long's brother Peter gets measles he is sent to stay with his Uncle Alan and Aunt Gwen in a flat with no garden. An elderly and reclusive landlady, Mrs Bartholomew, lives upstairs. Because he may be infectious he is not allowed out to play, and feels lonely. Without exercise he is less sleepy at night and when he hears the communal grandfather clock strangely strike 13, he investigates and finds the small back yard is now a large beautiful sunlit garden. Here he meets another lonely child called Hatty, who seems to be the only one who can see him. They have adventures which he gradually realises are taking place in the 19th century. Each night when Tom visits, Hatty is slightly older and Tom begins to wonder about the nature of time and reality. To discover what's going on Tom asks Hatty to leave her skates in a hidden place. When he goes back into the future he manages to find them. One night Hatty and Tom go out skating and Hatty begins to fall in love with a boy from her own time named Barty and Tom finds he is invisible to her. The next night Tom is unable to find the garden, running into rubbish bins from the modern day instead. Just before Tom returns home he meets Mrs Bartholomew, who is revealed to be the elderly Hatty.

== Cast ==
- Nigel Le Vaillant as Thomas Long, Adult
- Marlene Sidaway as Doris Schuster
- Serena Gordon as Melody Long
- Alfie Lawrence as Harriet Long
- Mel Martin as Alice Long
- Greta Scacchi as Aunt Gwen Kitson
- James Wilby as Uncle Alan Kitson
- Anthony Way as Tom Long
- Nick Robinson as Peter Long
- Liz Smith as Mrs. Willows
- Arlene Cockburn as Susan, The Maid
- Tom Bowles as Mr. Ferguson
- Joan Plowright as Mrs. Bartholomew, Old Hatty
- David Bradley as Abel
- Stuart Piper as Hubert
- Guy Witcher as Edgar
- Rory Jennings as James, 12 years
- Florence Hoath as Hatty, 12/13 years
- Penelope Wilton as Aunt Melbourne
- Laurel Melsom as Youngest Hatty
- Noah Huntley as James, 20 years
- Caroline Carver as Hatty, Young Woman
- Daniel Betts as Barty
- Robert Putt as Tower Keeper
- Arthur Cox as Mr. Batsford
