= Playing by Heart =

1998 film by Willard Carroll

- Directed by: Willard Carroll
- Written by: Willard Carroll
- Produced by: Willard Carroll; Meg Liberman; Tom Wilhite
- Starring: Gillian Anderson; Ellen Burstyn; Sean Connery; Anthony Edwards; Angelina Jolie; Jay Mohr; Ryan Phillippe; Dennis Quaid; Gena Rowlands; Jon Stewart; Madeleine Stowe
- Cinematography: Vilmos Zsigmond
- Edited by: Pietro Scalia
- Music by: John Barry; Christopher Young
- Production companies: Intermedia Films; Morpheus; Hyperion Pictures
- Distributed by: Miramax Films
- Release date: December 18, 1998
- Running time: 121 minutes
- Country: United States
- Language: English
- Budget: $14–20 million
- Box office: $4 million

Playing by Heart is a 1998 American comedy-drama film which tells the story of several seemingly unconnected characters. It was entered into the 49th Berlin International Film Festival. It stars Gillian Anderson, Ellen Burstyn, Sean Connery, Anthony Edwards, Angelina Jolie, Jay Mohr, Ryan Phillippe, Dennis Quaid, Gena Rowlands, Jon Stewart and Madeleine Stowe. Playing by Heart is an ensemble work that explores the path of love in its characters’ lives.

== Plot ==
In Los Angeles, the lives of intertwining characters are shown. Among the characters are an older couple, who are about to renew their wedding vows; a theatre director and architect navigating a new beginning; a young woman looking for a good time; a gay man dying of AIDS and his mother who had not been close; a couple having an affair and her husband who is exploring ways to break through the staleness of their marriage.

As the stories evolve, the connections between the characters become evident.

Unhappily-married Hugh regularly hits on women with an array of lies: that he has killed his wife and son in a car accident; that his wife and kids leave him on the same day he is fired; and that he has cheated on his wife with her brother. Hugh runs into improv classmate Valery in a bar, telling her he performs better in real life than in class.

Paul, suffering a brain tumour, and Hannah are planning their 40th-anniversary party and renewing their vows. Despite Hannah's best efforts, Paul refuses to address that he's dying. Hannah considers canceling her televised cooking show, but Paul won't let her. When Hannah confronts Paul over a picture of another woman on his desk, he admits he never slept with her because he was in love with her.

Lonely theatre director Meredith dates architect Trent. Both are divorced; Meredith has been burnt many times before, and Trent still wears his wedding ring four years on. Trent convinces Meredith to invite him over and cook him dinner. Meredith panics once he arrives, first telling him they will not be having sex, then asking him to leave, saying it's to avoid the inevitable heartache. However Trent gets a do-over, and they connect at his place.

The spark has gone from Gracie's marriage, who deals with this by meeting her lover Roger in hotel rooms before returning home to her distant husband Hugh. Roger wants their relationship to develop beyond just sex, but Gracie is firm on things staying the way they are. Gracie brings spontaneity to Roger's life for the first time.

Mark is gravely ill with AIDS and being looked after by his mother Mildred who, after years of estrangement, finally learns he is gay through his diagnosis. He asks her to recite Goodnight Moon to him as he dies.

Twenty-something clubber Joan flirts with Keenan after having a very final, vocal breakup with her ex via payphone. After complaining about how terrible her relationship was, Joan propositions Keenan to see a film only to be rebuffed as he 'doesn't date'. Even so, Keenan turns up at the movies as Joan proposes. Joan and Keenan admit their feelings. He reveals his former girlfriend contracted AIDS from sharing needles and died, and that, as a result, he is HIV-positive. Promising to be careful, they start a relationship.

Mildred calls Meredith for Mark's funeral, as he was her high school sweetheart, then husband, who left her for a man. Returning home with Mildred, Meredith goes next door to her parents - Hannah and Paul - where the anniversary preparations are well on their way. Sister Gracie appears to help, and little sister Joan breezes in at the last moment.

Roger officiates the ceremony, and we see all three sisters on the dance floor with their men and their parents. Even Gracie and Hugh seem to have reconciled.

== Cast ==
- Angelina Jolie as Joan
- Dennis Quaid as Hugh
- Ellen Burstyn as Mildred
- Jay Mohr as Mark
- Ryan Phillippe as Keenan
- Gena Rowlands as Hannah
- Sean Connery as Paul
- Gillian Anderson as Meredith
- Jon Stewart as Trent
- Madeleine Stowe as Gracie
- Anthony Edwards as Roger
- Kellie Waymire as Jane
- April Grace as Valery
- Patricia Clarkson as Allison
- Michael Emerson as Bosco
- Amanda Peet as Amber
- Alec Mapa as Lana
- Nastassja Kinski as The Lawyer (uncredited)

== Production ==
According to director Willard Carroll, the film was made on a budget of $14 million as the cast led by Sean Connery agreed to work for $50,000 each. Carroll praised Connery, saying he "continued his total democratic cooperation in the ensemble piece. He was the most generous actor, although he's a larger-than-life star" and that Connery "set the example" the others followed.

The film's original working title was Dancing About Architecture, a reference to a line in the film (based on a quote regarding "writing about music") that the idea of "talking about love" is equivalent to "dancing about architecture". A second working title, If Only They Knew, made it as far as the top label for some copies of the soundtrack CD. Executive producers include Bob Weinstein and Harvey Weinstein for Miramax Films.

Jon Stewart's character is an architect, his home in the film is the Stahl House.

The soundtrack includes songs by Morcheeba, Bonnie Raitt, Bran Van 3000, Edward Kowalczyk of Live, Neneh Cherry and Moby.

== Reception ==
The film was released in the United States on December 18, 1998. In the United Kingdom, it was released on August 6, 1999, and opened at the number 11 spot.

On Rotten Tomatoes, the film has an approval rating of 61% based on 51 reviews. The website's critics consensus reads: "It's overly talky, but Playing by Heart benefits from witty insights into modern relationships and strong performances from an esteemed cast." On Metacritic, the film has a weighted average score of 55 out of 100 based on 26 critics, indicating "mixed or average reviews". Audiences surveyed by CinemaScore gave the film an average grade of "B+" on an A+ to F scale.

Roger Ebert gave it a thumbs down, and 2.5 out of 4 in his print review, due to its entertaining dialogue, star power, and charming moments, but determines it to be a 'near miss' because of its soft, gooey center. It was one of the last films reviewed on air, by film critic Gene Siskel, on Siskel and Ebert at the Movies, before his death on February 20, 1999. Like Ebert, Siskel gave it a thumbs down, deeming the film more about behaviour than story.

Jolie won an award for "Best Breakthrough Performance by an Actress" from the National Board of Review of Motion Pictures, and writer/director Willard Carroll was nominated for an award at the Berlin International Film Festival.
