= Hugh Maguire (actor) =

American actor (1933–2023)

- Maguire in Batman v Superman: Dawn of Justice, 2016
- Born: Hugh John Maguire; April 22, 1933; Los Angeles, California, U.S.
- Died: May 18, 2023 (aged 90)
- Occupations: Film and television actor

Hugh John Maguire (April 22, 1933 – May 18, 2023) was an American film and television actor. He was best known for playing the recurring role of Hugh in the American sitcom television series Cheers.

In 1989, Maguire starred as Ed Mathews in the CBS sitcom television series Live-In, starring along with Chris Young. He guest-starred in television programs including 227, Knots Landing. Growing Pains, Wings and L.A. Law. He also appeared in films such as Batman v Superman: Dawn of Justice, Vanishing on 7th Street, The Double. In 2021, he retired from acting, last appearing in the film No Sudden Move, playing Mel Forbert.

Maguire died of natural causes on May 18, 2023, at the age of 90.
