= Marigold (2007 film) =

2007 film by Willard Carroll

- Marigold film poster
- Directed by: Willard Carroll
- Written by: Willard Carroll
- Produced by: Charles Salmon
- Starring: Salman Khan; Ali Larter
- Cinematography: Anil Mehta
- Edited by: Anuradha Singh
- Music by: Shankar–Ehsaan–Loy, Graeme Revell
- Production companies: Hyperion Pictures; Entertainment One India; Becker Films International; Firewall Entertainment
- Distributed by: Adlabs Films
- Release date: 17 August 2007 (U.S.)
- Running time: 108 minutes
- Countries: United States; India; United Kingdom
- Languages: English; Hindi
- Budget: ₹19 crore
- Box office: ₹2.29 crore

Marigold (also known as Marigold: An Adventure in India) is a 2007 romantic musical comedy directed by Willard Carroll. The film is about Marigold Lexton, an American actress who begins a personal transformation and becomes enamored with India as she experiences Bollywood firsthand. It stars Salman Khan and Ali Larter as the title character.

== Plot ==
Marigold Lexton, a self-centered and temperamental young American actress, arrives in India expecting to be treated like a star, despite the fact that she has been making nothing but B movie sequels for some time. She is stranded in Goa after the film she was to star in is canceled, and a sympathetic crew member offers her a ride, which brings her to the set of another movie, a Bollywood musical. She actually tells her boyfriend Barry that she was hoping she wouldn't have to marry him if this trip was successful, and soon finds herself the center of attraction on the set, where she quickly lands a minor role and a date with the spoiled young lead actor. But after she rebuffs his crude proposal that night she winds up talking with Prem, the film's choreographer. He knows she lied about being able to dance, and takes her in hand while showing her the nearby towns and countryside in their spare time.

As they grow closer Prem talks to her about the importance of family, and she not only learns that he is estranged from his father, but that he is also a prince. He had not seen his family in three years, but the day before he received a call from his sister, asking him to come home for her wedding. He asks Marigold to go home with him to Jodhpur, Rajasthan, for the wedding, since shooting on the movie had been shut down for a week. She is entranced by the generosity and opulence of his family leading up to the wedding but afterward is shocked to discover that he has been betrothed to another since childhood. He has fallen totally in love with Marigold but has neglected to mention the long-arranged marriage, and his father has not encouraged him to follow his heart. She feels betrayed and storms out, followed by Prem's fiancé, who offers to buy her a drink. She confesses to Marigold that although she loves Prem she doesn't believe he has ever really loved her.

Meanwhile, Prem, a teetotaler, heads to a bar to drown his sorrows, where he finds a drunken American who commiserates with his romantic problems. He explains he has come looking for his estranged girlfriend, called Marigold, and Prem invites him to stay the night at his parents' house. Barry accepts and then passes out. In the morning, Marigold decides to return with Barry to the United States, since Prem, the only son of Jaipur's Ruler, feels duty bound to marry the woman his father has chosen. The ceremony takes place that day, and as he follows his bride, whose face is totally hidden behind a long veil, seven times around the Holy fire, Prem believes he is marrying the woman he has been engaged to since childhood. With the marriage complete, Prem lifts his wife's veil, and he and most of the guests are astonished to find Marigold standing before him—and it appears that Barry has married Prem's former fiancé as well. The movie's director and their friends from the crew appear in the crowd, cheering, then Prem sings and dances with Marigold and a full chorus, just like a happy ending in a Bollywood musical.

== Cast ==
- Salman Khan as Prem Rajput
  - Fazl Khan as Young Prem Rajput
- Ali Larter as Marigold Lexton
- Simone Singh as Shazia
- Nandana Sen as Jaanvi
- Ian Bohen as Barry
- Shari Watson as Doreen
- Helen as Prem's Grandmother
- Vikas Bhalla as Raj Sondi
- Suchitra Pillai as Rani
- Vijayendra Ghatge as Mr Rajput
- Roopak Saluja as Mani
- Kiran Juneja as Mrs Rajput
- Gulshan Grover as Vikram
- Rakesh Bedi as Manoj
- Marc Allen Lewis as Marc
- Punita Trikha as Jewelry Designer
- Lea Moreno Young as Valjean
- Catherine Fulop as Sister Fernandéz

== Production ==
While in India, Carroll had seen a Bollywood film (with Salman Khan), and, after seeing 150 such films, he hired Larter (whom he had worked with before) and Khan to be in a "crossover" film (although Carroll says he dislikes the term and prefers the idea of an "international audience"). Larter said that her role in the film, to some degree, mirrored her life at the time. Larter lacked professional dance training and worked with a choreographer to prepare for the filming. One of the songs features her own singing.

Composer Graeme Revell augmented the songs with a Western (and in one case an Indian) sound and ended up striking an overall balance between the two. Carroll decided that some of the songs should be in Hindi.

CGI effects were used to create most of the white Taj Mahal (there were some set pieces built) and all of the mirroring black structure.

== Soundtrack ==
Marigold

Soundtrack album by Shankar–Ehsaan–Loy
- Released: 9 June 2007
- Recorded: 2006
- Genre: Feature film soundtrack
- Language: Hindi; English
- Label: Big Music
- Producer: Charles Salmon; Tom Wilhite

Shankar–Ehsaan–Loy chronology
Jhoom Barabar Jhoom (2007)	Marigold (2007)	Salaam-e-Ishq: A Tribute To Love (2007)

The music of the film is composed by Shankar–Ehsaan–Loy while the lyrics are penned by Javed Akhtar.

Tracks
No.	Title	Artist(s)	Length
1.	"Yeh Pyaar Kya Hai (Seven Stages Of Love)"	Shaan
2.	"Yeh Pyaar Hai (That's Love)"	Chorus, Shaan
3.	"Paagal Si Saari Leheren (Beach Blanket Bollywood)"	Alka Yagnik, Vikas Bhalla
4.	"Sachha Pyaar (The Meaning Of Love)"	Nikita Nigam
5.	"Tan Man (Marigold Erupts)"	Alka Yagnik, Nihira Joshi, Sneha Pant, Vikas Bhalla
6.	"Listen To The Music (English)"	Ali Larter, Shaan, Truth Hurts
7.	"The Meaning Of Love (English)"	Truth Hurts
8.	"Seven Stages Of Love (English)"	Shaan, Truth Hurts

== Reception ==
In India, the film grossed ₹38 lakh in first two weeks.

On the review aggregator website Rotten Tomatoes, 30% of 27 critics' reviews are positive. The website's consensus reads: "Marigold attempts the difficult trick of combining Bollywood movies and American rom-coms -- and ends up with an awkward blend that will not satisfy fans" Rachel Saltz of The New York Times rated the film 4 out of 5, stating ″ Mr. Carroll knows his Bollywood stuff and, refreshingly, doesn’t apologize for, or waste time explaining, an industry and a style that most Americans still regard as silly. Instead, he honors them.″ Conversely, Kirk Honeycutt of The Hollywood Reporter gave a negative review, writing ″The film will suffer on two fronts: Bollywood fans will dismiss the mishmash as the work of an American director “slumming” in a genre outside his own culture, and Western audiences unfamiliar with Hindi-language masala movies will find the whole thing puzzling.″
