= Anthony Way =

English chorister and classical singer

- Born: 14 December 1982 (age 43); London, England
- Years active: 1995–1999

Anthony Way (born 14 December 1982) is an English chorister and classical singer, who rose to fame after appearing as a chorister in a BBC TV series. He has since had success as a recording artist, with gold and platinum discs to his credit.

== Biography ==
Way was born in London, England, and was a chorister by the age of eight. He is the sixth child out of eight siblings. His mother (Eileen Way) was a housewife. His father (Garry Way) worked as an officer at Wormwood Scrubs Prison. In 1990, the prison chaplain, the Rev. Ray Guymer, suggested to Way's father that young Anthony should go for a voice trial at St Paul's Cathedral. Way passed the audition and was given a place at the Cathedral Choir School at the age of nine.

At the age of twelve, he received attention for his portrayal of Henry Ashworth in the lavish 1995 BBC mini-series based on the Joanna Trollope novel The Choir as a gifted young chorister whose voice saved a cathedral and its choir. The series comprised five episodes and also aired on America's PBS Network. Way was the prominent voice on The Choir soundtrack, and was backed by the Gloucester Cathedral Choir and the Warsaw Philharmonic Orchestra. Released by PolyGram label Decca, the recording went platinum, selling 350,000 copies worldwide and spent 15 weeks at the top of the UK Classical Chart. It was notably the fastest-selling classical release since the Three Tenors five years previously. Meanwhile, in the UK Albums Chart the album secured a number 3 spot. (The DVD of the series was eventually released in March 2006, shortly after "The Choirboys" debut album became the fastest selling classical debut album).

In 1995, his record label released "The Choirboy," an amalgamation of classic and contemporary songs which was excluded from the UK Classical Chart. A court battle then ensued between Way's record label and the Classic Chart compilers that resulted in media controversy and saw Way splashed across the national press, propelling the album to gold status and taking total album sales to half a million. The chart compilers soon thereafter started a new classical crossover chart (in January 1996). From this album also came the hit singles "Panis Angelicus" and "The Lord's Prayer" which both went gold or platinum within a short time of their release.

In mid 1995, Way and the choir played an important part in the "VE Day 50" celebrations: Firstly, St Paul's Cathedral hosted the National Service of Thanksgiving that was broadcast live on British television; the day after in London's Hyde Park, the youngster performed "Panis Angelicus" in front of an estimated crowd of 150,000 people including the Queen and the rest of the Royal Family. The event was broadcast live to millions of people on television worldwide and introduced the boy to a whole new audience.

By the summer of 1996, Way had risen to Deputy Head Chorister at St Paul's. The choir was given the honour of serenading Queen Elizabeth The Queen Mother on her 96th Birthday. Way recorded The Choirboy's Christmas with the English Chamber Orchestra, released in November 1997. This album was recorded in London's Temple Church, where chorister Ernest Lough had recorded his version of "O For the Wings of a Dove" more than sixty years earlier. It was reported that Decca spent an initial advertising budget of £300,000 in the run up to Christmas to promote his new album. By the following Easter, the album had sold over 60,000 copies. The choir also recorded two other albums at this time, How Can I Keep From Singing? and Passiontide at St. Paul's, both of which featured a number of soloists, including Way on one track. In May of that year, maturity took its toll on his signature treble voice forever. His final few concerts saw him perform in King's College Chapel, Cambridge, and at the home of the English Sinfonia in Stevenage, where he performed tracks live from the album for the last time, alongside his old friend and "Choirgirl of the Year 1995", Tabitha Watling. To mark his retirement as a treble soloist, Decca released The Best of Anthony Way in 1998.

He starred as Tom Long in 1999's film version of Tom's Midnight Garden, alongside Greta Scacchi, James Wilby, Joan Plowright and Nigel Le Vaillant, filmed in the summer of 1997 in England and the Isle of Man. The film won critical acclaim on its release at the Giffoni Film Festival in Italy.

== Discography ==
=== Solo albums ===
- The Choirboy (Permanent Records PERMCD 41, CD) 1995 – With the St. Paul's Cathedral Choir and The Bach Choir [UK platinum album]
- The Choirboy's Christmas (Decca 455 050–2, CD) 1996 – Featuring St. Paul's Cathedral Choir, London
- Wings of a Dove (Decca 455 645, CD) 1997 – With the Choir of Uppingham School (mixed choir)
- The Best of Anthony Way (Decca 4605722, CD) 1998 – with the St. Paul's Cathedral Choir, London

=== Singles ===
- "Panis Angelicus" ( 448 164–2, 3-track CD Single) 1995
- "The Lord's Prayer" (Permanent Records CDS PERM 26, 4-track CD Single) 1995
- "Panis Angelicus" (Permanent Records CDSPERM 26, 3-track CD Single) 1996

=== Recordings as featured artist ===
- The Choir, (Warner 925 668, CD) 1995 The Soundtrack to the Television Mini-Series
- How Can I Keep From Singing? (EMI 569 620, CD) 1996
- World of Boy Soprano (PolyGram K.K. (London) POCL 4373, CD) 1996 Japanese Compilation CD of music on the Decca Label from 1951–1996.
- Passiontide at St. Paul's (Hyperion CDA 66916, CD) 1997 St. Paul's Cathedral Choir
- Ultimate Carol Collection (Decca 4588632, CD) November 1997 – King's College Choir, Cambridge

== Films and videos ==
- The Choir (Film/TV) 1995, (DVD March 2006) IMDB
- Tom's Midnight Garden (MGM/Vine 21393, DVD) 1998 IMDB
