= Deep Down (film) =

- VHS cover
- Directed by: John Travers
- Screenplay by: Alice Horrigan, John Travers
- Produced by: Cassian Elwes, John Morrissey
- Starring: George Segal, Tanya Roberts, Chris Young
- Cinematography: David J. Miller
- Edited by: John Lafferty
- Music by: Tyler Bates
- Production company: Penn-Eden West Pictures
- Distributed by: Imperial Entertainment Corporation
- Release date: 1994 (United States)
- Running time: 85 minutes
- Country: United States
- Language: English

Deep Down is a 1994 American erotic thriller film directed by John Travers and starring George Segal, Tanya Roberts, and Chris Young. The film combines elements of drama and romance, showing the characters' struggle with internal and external conflicts against the backdrop of the desire for wealth and success. The original screenplay was titled Conversations in Public Places and was a finalist in the Academy of Motion Picture Arts and Sciences Nicholl Fellowships in Screenwriting competition.

== Plot ==
Andy (Chris Young) comes to California with dreams of becoming a rock musician. He rents a room in a modest apartment complex in North Hollywood with a swimming pool from Craig (Christopher Tabori). Andy soon meets an attractive older woman, Charlotte (Tanya Roberts), who lives with her much older, jealous husband (George Segal). Andy and Charlotte have a steamy affair, and in the style of Rear Window, the story unfolds in a sinister whirl of passion, surveillance, and deceit.

== Cast ==
- George Segal as Gil
- Roderick Thorp as Cook
- Chris Young as Andy
- Mathew Valencia as Boy
- Lisa Rhoden as Holly
- Kristoffer Tabori as Craig
- Tanya Roberts as Charlotte
- Paul Le Mat as Ray
- James Farentino as Joey
