= The Runestone =

- Movie poster
- Directed by: Willard Carroll
- Written by: Willard Carroll
- Produced by: Harry E. Gould Jr. Joe Michael Terry; Thomas L. Wilhite
- Starring: Peter Riegert; Joan Severance; William Hickey; Alexander Godunov
- Cinematography: Misha Suslov
- Music by: David Newman
- Production company: Hyperion Pictures
- Distributed by: The Movie Group
- Release date: October 1991 (Chicago International Film Festival)
- Running time: 100 minutes
- Country: United States
- Language: English

The Runestone is a 1991 American adventure horror film written and directed by Willard Carroll in his feature directorial debut. The film is an updating of the Ragnarok legend, with Fenrir being found in a runestone in Pennsylvania unearthed by archaeologists. The film is based upon the novel by Mark E. Rogers, which was published in a small press limited edition pamphlet.

== Plot ==
Deep in a coal mine in Pennsylvania, a strange stone is found with Norse runes. The stone is transported to New York City, where archaeologists investigate the mystery. Death and destruction follow, as one of the archeologists becomes possessed, and begins killing everyone around him. Sam Stewart and wife Marla (Joan Severance) find it has some connection to their friend Martin. A young boy named Jacob (Chris Young) is haunted by terrifying nightmares of what is to come, and his uncle (William Hickey) explains these dreams through stories from Norse legend, which says that the only one who can destroy Fenrir is Týr, the Norse god of single combat, victory and heroic glory, who is prophesied to return to fight the creature. In the nick of time, the mystical Clockmaker (Alexander Godunov), who actually is Týr, begins fighting Fenrir. The film cast includes Peter Riegert as a Pez popping, cussing policeman, and features a cameo by Rick Marzan as a police officer named Strange.

== Cast ==
- Peter Riegert as Captain Gregory Fanducci
- Joan Severance as Marla Stewart
- William Hickey as Lars Hagstrom
- Tim Ryan as Sam Stewart
- Mitchell Laurance as Martin Almquist
- Lawrence Tierney as Chief Richardson
- Dawan Scott as Fenrir
- Chris Young as Jacob
- Alexander Godunov as Sigvaldson, The Clockmaker
- Donald Hotton as Ask Franag
- Arthur Malet as Stoddard
- Rick Marzan as Strange
- John Hobson as Security Guard

== Release ==
The film was released on VHS and laserdisc in the United States by Live Home Video in 1991. In Germany the film was released as Anthony III, without having any connection to The Kindred, which has been released as Anthony. In the late 2010s it was released on DVD.

== Soundtrack ==
In March 2010, Perseverance Records released the soundtrack album with music by David Newman. The score was reminiscent of the 1950s B-movie scores composed by Henry Mancini such as Creature from the Black Lagoon and Tarantula.
