= Live-In =

American sitcom

- Genre: Sitcom
- Created by: Robert Sternin; Prudence Fraser
- Starring: Chris Young; Lisa Patrick; Hugh Maguire; Kimberly Farr; David Moscow; Lightfield Lewis; Jenny O'Hara
- Opening theme: "Happy Together"
- Composer: Ray Colcord
- Country of origin: United States
- Original language: English
- No. of seasons: 1
- No. of episodes: 9

Production
- Executive producers: Robert Sternin; Prudence Fraser
- Running time: 24 minutes
- Production companies: Sternin & Fraser Ink, Inc.; ELP Communications Columbia Pictures Television

Original release
- Network: CBS
- Release: March 20 – May 22, 1989

Live-In is an American sitcom created by Robert Sternin and Prudence Fraser that aired on CBS from March 20 to May 22, 1989. The series focuses on young Australian au pair Lisa Wells (Lisa Patrick) integrating into the home life of a New Jersey family and their teenage son Danny Mathews' (Chris Young) efforts to become her boyfriend. It was a joint production of Sternin & Fraser Ink, Inc. in association with Columbia Pictures Television for CBS.

Nine episodes were filmed in Los Angeles, which CBS hoped would draw a younger audience to the network.

While premiering to decent ratings, subsequent episodes suffered from low viewership, and CBS canceled the mid-season replacement before the final episode aired. The show received highly negative reviews from television critics; some named it one of the worst series of 1989 and felt it did not live up to CBS' reputation for airing high-quality programming. They described the writing as childish and thought the content was unoriginal, but were mostly approving of Patrick's role.

== Premise and characters ==
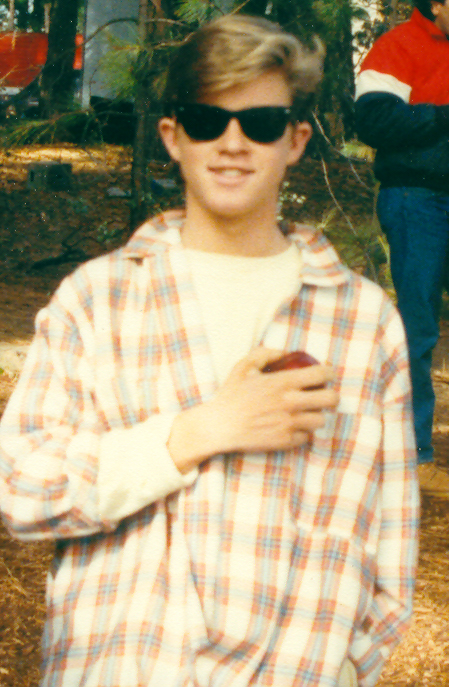
Chris Young plays teenager Danny Mathews on Live-In.

The Mathews, a suburban New Jersey family, hire Lisa Wells (Lisa Patrick), an attractive young Australian woman who grew up in a large household in the Australian outback as a live-in nanny to take care of their newborn daughter Melissa Mathews (Melissa and Allison Lindsay). Her mother Sarah Mathews (Kimberly Farr) works as a manager at Macy's in Manhattan; father Ed Mathews (Hugh Maguire) is the proprietor of Mathews Sporting Goods Store in New Jersey. The couple has two other children: oldest son Danny Mathews (Chris Young), a high school sophomore determined to become Lisa's boyfriend; and Peter Mathews (David Moscow), a freshman with less of an interest in girls and who gets along amicably with her.

The supporting cast comprises Muriel Spiegelman (Jenny O'Hara), Sarah's friend and prying neighbor; and Danny's best friend Gator (Lightfield Lewis), who is also enamored of Lisa. Comedic situations arise from Danny and Gator's obsession with girls and how Lisa spurns their advances. Storylines also revolve around her adjustment to American culture, and Sarah often expresses second thoughts about Lisa spending more time with Melissa than she can.

== Production ==
Robert Sternin and Prudence Fraser created and executive produced Live-In; their company Sternin & Fraser Ink, Inc. handled production along with ELP Communications. The couple had previously written scripts for shows like Who's the Boss?, and produced 1987 ABC television series The Charmings. Filming began in February 1989 in Los Angeles, where episodes were taped twice in front of two separate audiences. CBS initially gave Live-In a seven-episode order; the network requested additional episodes after the broadcast of the second.

Ray Colcord composed the series' music, including its theme, a cover of the Turtles' "Happy Together". The song is present in the Castle Bryant Johnsen-designed title sequence, which The Philadelphia Inquirer's David Bianculli thought resembled a music video. According to the director of music at the show's distributor, Columbia Pictures Television, a contemporary recording was used because producers "wanted to attract baby boomers who remembered the original and the younger audience who didn't".

=== Casting ===
Chris Young had previously played roles in several movies and the ABC television series Max Headroom. At the time of production, the 17-year-old was considered an up-and-coming teen idol who could be launched into stardom with a role on a sitcom like Live-In. As his parents had established careers in Philadelphia, Young stayed with his aunt and uncle while the show was filmed. While he received offers to star on other series, Young chose Live-In because he liked its premise the most.

Conversely, Lisa Patrick made her acting debut on the show. The program's casting director noticed the Australian model's appearance in an AT&T commercial and invited her to a Los Angeles audition in December 1988. Due to her inexperience, she attended acting coach Bill Hudnut's private workshops for several days each week to improve her skills and become accustomed to performing in front of an audience. He was also present on the show's set and helped Patrick review her lines privately before she did so with the rest of the cast.

== Episodes ==
No.	Title	Directed by (Note: Information is taken from the opening credits of each episode.)	Written by	Original release date	U.S. viewers (millions)	Rating/share (households)
1	"Pilot"	Will Mackenzie	Robert Sternin and Prudence Fraser	March 20, 1989	17.7	12.6/20
Lisa arrives at the Mathews' home and attracts Danny's attention. Danny and Gator drill a peephole through a bathroom wall in an attempt to see her nude, but she sees Danny naked instead. Later, Lisa overhears a conversation between Sarah and Ed which makes her believe she will be dismissed the next day, but soon realizes Sarah was referring to firing Muriel from her job at the department store—not her.
2	"The Coupe, the Croup and Everything"	Andrew D. Weyman	David Nichols	March 27, 1989	14.7	10.4/16
Danny gets his driver's license and wants to go on a date, but the car his parents bought for him is to be shared with Lisa. Ed and Sarah leave Lisa in charge of the house as they go for a night out. When Melissa gets sick with croup, Lisa prevents Danny from using the car to go on a date until Ed and Sarah return.
3	"Dan the Man and the B-Ball Scam"	Andrew D. Weyman	Mindy Glazer	April 3, 1989	12.1	9.1/15
Danny gets Lisa to go on a date with his basketball coach so he receives more playing time during the next game.
4	"Peter's I-Dented-It Crisis"	Valentine Mayer	Eric Gilliland	April 10, 1989	12.0	8.9/14
Peter has a crush on his clarinet partner, Joan, but she is only interested in Danny. Danny flirts with Joan to make Lisa jealous, but Lisa is unbothered and Peter gets mad. Peter takes Joan in Ed's car and thinks he dented it, but it was Sarah who did earlier and did not tell them.
5	"Les Liaisons Harmless"	Valentine Mayer	Eric Gilliland	April 17, 1989	12.2	8.9/16
Danny, Peter, and Gator mistakenly believe Ed is interested in Lisa.
6	"Mommy and Me and Au Pair Makes Three"	Valentine Mayer	Ellen Guylas	May 1, 1989	11.1	8.5/14
Muriel makes Sarah believe Lisa is trying to take over as Melissa's mother. Sarah encourages Lisa to leave the house more often. While out one day, Danny and Gator believe she is in a secret relationship. They follow Lisa to a library, but she is only homesick.
7	"Kissing Cousins"	Howard Murray	David Nichols	May 8, 1989 (Note: On May 8, 1989, "Kissing Cousins" was aired on some CBS stations while "It Takes Two to Tutor" was on others. CBS stations that broadcast "Kissing Cousins" on May 8 aired "It Takes Two to Tutor" on June 5, while those who did not opted for other programming in the show's regular time slot that day. The broadcast of "It Takes Two to Tutor" on June 5 was classified as a repeat and received eight million viewers and a household rating and share of 6.4/12.)	11.3	8.2/14
Danny is jealous of Lisa's attraction to his cousin Eric.
8	"It Takes Two to Tutor"	Andrew D. Weyman	Trish Soodik	May 8, 1989	11.3	8.2/14
Danny's female tutor invites him to attend her professor father's college party. Rather than an attraction to Danny, however, she does so to get back at her father.
9	"Daddy's Girl"	Andrew D. Weyman	Ellen Guylas	May 22, 1989	10.4	7.7/14
Danny, Peter, Gator, and Lisa go camping while Sarah's father visits with her and Ed. Based on his words, Sarah believes her father is dying. However, he was only hiding the fact he is engaged.

== Broadcast and cancellation ==
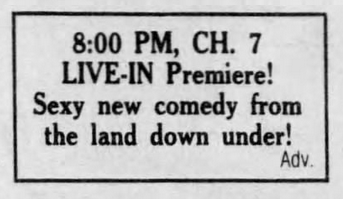
A newspaper advertisement for the show

Live-In premiered on CBS on March 20, 1989, as a mid-season replacement in the 1988–89 United States television season, taking the time slot of Newhart. The network scheduled the series on Monday nights at 8 p.m. ET preceding Heartland, a new sitcom starring Brian Keith. Both series featured predominately young casts and teen-oriented storylines that CBS hoped would draw young adult viewers. With 20 percent of households watching television at the time of its broadcast tuned in to the show, Variety said the first episode was "good news for CBS" as it improved upon the network's average in the time slot that season. Subsequent episodes' ratings declined, however, with most only receiving an audience share of about 14 percent.

Within the official television season which ended on April 16, 1989, Live-In averaged a household rating of 10.3 according to Nielsen Media Research, placing 83rd among the 125 series aired. CBS canceled the show a month later on May 19, 1989, the same day it announced a schedule for the following television season. The ninth and final episode aired three days later on May 22. According to The Wall Street Journal, the show was one of several youth-oriented series, along with TV 101 and Dirty Dancing, which were "particularly catastrophic" for CBS that season. The network struggled to promote Live-In because their popular programs at the time such as 60 Minutes were not geared towards a young audience. Outside of the United States, the series was simulcast by Global in the Canadian province of Ontario, and Nine broadcast it in Australia from October to December 1989. Fraser later said she thought the show "was a miscalculation ... [because] it offended a lot of people".

== Critical reception ==
Live-In was "heavily criticized" by reviewers; a poll of 28 American newspaper television critics named it the worst series of the first half of 1989. In advance of the premiere, David Bianculli said CBS should no longer be considered a high-quality network for airing it and felt the program's "only redeeming moment is the title sequence". Eric Mink of the St. Louis Post-Dispatch agreed, writing that "with the exception of the ... stylish opening credit sequence, [the] show is so blatantly stupid it defies belief". The Cincinnati Enquirer's John Kiesewetter cited the series as an example of declining network standards at the time, as did the Asbury Park Press' Robert Strauss. Writing that it undermined CBS' public commitment to high-quality programming, Hester Riches of the Vancouver Sun felt the show diminished others on Mondays, such as Murphy Brown.

The program's script received negative reviews. Jeff Jarvis of People graded the series an "F" and remarked "CBS must have been desperate to fill a half hour" to broadcast it. Referencing Danny and Gator's interactions, he deemed it "the most infantile show ever on Mondays—or perhaps ever on the air". In Variety, Tony Scott criticized the "plain bad ... breast-and-crotch humor" and felt the show's writers lacked the "inventiveness or finesse with the characters" that could make the show successful. Rating it 2 out of 5 stars, Bud Wilkinson of The Arizona Republic described the dialogue as "excessively juvenile". Diane Holloway of the Austin American-Statesman called the show "incredibly immature" and said the financial burden on a working family to hire a live-in made the premise implausible. Jon Burlingame agreed, questioning in United Feature Syndicate how the Mathews could afford an au pair—much less an Australian one. The Shreveport Journal's Nancy Morris considered it unrealistic for a woman of Patrick's appearance to work in such a role.

Many considered the series unimaginative. Citing the premiere's shower scene, Steve Hall of The Indianapolis Star described Sternin and Fraser as lacking "an original funny idea in their heads" as he felt it was similar to that in Porky's (1981). He also thought Ed, Peter, and Muriel were the cliché "distracted dad, pesky younger brother, [and] kooky neighbor" sitcom characters. Kathryn Baker of the Associated Press disagreed, praising the pair for writing "one of the better [pilots] of the season". In a positive review, Newsday's David Friedman felt the program followed the tried-and-true "assemble a cast viewers at home want to spend time with, make sure at least one of them is extremely good-looking, then give them a few funny things to say" formula successfully. Mark Dawidziak of the Akron Beacon Journal, however, criticized the show and its characters for being derivative, and Wilkinson felt it was predictable. Writing for the Tyler Courier-Times, Grace C. Biggers felt Live-In was a rip-off of Mr. Belvedere due to its similar plot.

The reception to Patrick's performance was mostly positive. Morris described her chemistry with Young as "electric", Biggers gave particular praise to her, and Kay Gardella of the New York Daily News said she "does fine" in her role despite the show's "thin story line". Pitying Patrick, The Washington Post's Tom Shales described her character as "the only remotely interesting element" of a show beneath her potential. Michael Dougan concurred in the San Francisco Examiner, writing that Patrick stood out from the rest of the cast and deserved better than Live-In. In contrast, Richard Glover of The Sydney Morning Herald sarcastically remarked she "demonstrated mastery of all the major emotions, including surprise (eyes opened wide) and happiness (eyebrows raised, teeth bared)".
