= The Oz Kids =

- Also known as: Little Wizard Stories
- Genre: Adventure; Comedy drama Fantasy; Serial
- Created by: Willard Carroll
- Starring: Julianne Michelle; Eric Lloyd; Shay Astar
- Country of origin: United States
- Original language: English
- No. of seasons: 1
- No. of episodes: 9

Production
- Producers: Willard Carroll; Thomas L. Wilhite; John Bush
- Running time: 40–89 minutes
- Production companies: Hyperion Animation; Meldac; Canal + D.A. Wang Film Productions

Original release
- Network: Direct-to-video
- Release: October 1, 1996 – February 18, 1997

The Oz Kids is an American direct-to-video animated fantasy comedy-drama series produced by Hyperion Animation based on The Wizard of Oz, L. Frank Baum's 1900 children's novel, and its various sequels. Nine episodes were released between October 1, 1996 and February 18, 1997 by Paramount Home Video.

The two main characters of this series are both human: Dot and Neddie (the children of Dorothy and Zeb). The minor characters are Boris and Bela (the children of the Cowardly Lion), Tin Boy (the son of the Tin Woodman), Scarecrow Jr. (the son of the original Scarecrow), Jack Pumpkinhead Jr. (the son of the original Jack Pumpkinhead), Frank, (the son of the Wizard), and Andrea, (the daughter of Glinda).

== Characters ==
=== Main ===
- Dot (voiced by Julianne Michelle) is Dorothy and Zeb's 8-year-old daughter, and Neddie's older sister. Born and raised in the Land of Oz, she wears country clothing as an homage to her mother's Kansas heritage. She is depicted as a brave, tomboyish, and level-headed girl who often uses her resourcefulness to get her friends out of dangerous situations.
- Neddie (voiced by Eric Lloyd) is Dorothy and Zeb's 5-year-old son and Dot's younger brother. Residing in the Emerald City, he is depicted as an inquisitive and energetic yet naive young boy whose trusting nature and lack of real-world savvy frequently land him in trouble. Despite his impressionable personality, he is shown to rely on his sister's guidance and his own moral judgment to make the right decisions.
- Toto 2 (voiced by Frank Welker) is Dot and Neddie's pet black Cairn Terrier. She is a puppy named after her father, Dorothy's original dog.

=== Supporting ===
- Scarecrow Jr. (voiced by Jonathan Taylor Thomas and Scott McAfee) is the son of the original Scarecrow. In contrast to his father, Scarecrow Jr. is depicted as a self-assured boy genius who is overly confident in his intellect. Although analytical and strategic, his emotional development is less advanced, leading to childish behavior when his plans are disregarded. His stubbornness and "know-it-all" attitude frequently create humorous conflicts with his friends and cause his ideas to backfire. Over the course of the series, he learns to become a team player in order to successfully implement his plans.
- Tin Boy (voiced by Benjamin Salisbury) is the son of the Tin Woodman who met Dorothy on the road to Oz and was given a heart by the Wizard of Oz. The Tin Woodman rules the Winkie Country, west of Emerald City. Tin Boy is particularly good with his hands he has a decidedly mechanical nature. He can construct and/or fix almost anything. Tin Boy is a very emotional character, he empathizes, often in the extreme, with the problems of others. Tin Boy is very trusting, which frequently leaves him vulnerable to being exploited by others.
- Boris (voiced by Bradley Pierce) and Bella (voiced by Shayna Fox) are lion cubs, the children of the once-Cowardly Lion. The Cowardly Lion rules the kingdom to the south of Emerald City, Quadling Country. Genetically, Boris and Bela are twins but they couldn't be more different in personality.
  - Boris is very shy and gentle, easily intimidated and frightened. Older than Bela by 12 seconds. When pushed to the limit, however, Boris always comes through. Boris often surprises his more aggressive sister, and himself, with his courage. Boris likes music and is constantly whistling or humming, often seeming to be lost in daydreams.
  - Bela is a very aggressive, very vocal lion cub, she can be something of a brat and a bully. Younger than Boris by 12 seconds. Bela always wants to be in charge, and thinks that her way is best, but she is often shown-up by her friends. Bela tries to project a certain air of superiority but, underneath, she has the same insecurities as other children of her age. Bela's bravura gets her into trouble, her lack of experience often resulting in her being unable to pull herself out of it. Bela is often embarrassed by the affection she feels for others, particularly Boris, and has trouble expressing her feelings.
- Jack Pumpkinhead Jr. (voiced by Aaron Michael Metchik) is the son of his namesake, his father is a gentle elder of Emerald City who serves beside the Scarecrow. Jack is a somewhat fragile young man and is very fastidious, he doesn't like to soil his hands or his clothes. Jack's obsession with cleanliness borders upon the charmingly neurotic and, of course, through circumstances, he often gets dirty than any of his friends. He often surprises his friends with his solid solutions to the problems which confront them.
- Frank (voiced by Alex Zuckerman) is the son of the Wizard of Oz. His father, who now lives in Oz and works closely with the Scarecrow, is a widower. Frank was born outside of Oz and, at 10, is the oldest of the children. Frank is very much his father's son, blustery and something of a charlatan. Frank is the most eager to embark upon the kids' many exciting, and potentially-dangerous, excursions. Frank has scientist learnings, he is an inventor with an invention for almost any occasion. Of all the children in Oz, Frank most desires to return, permanently, to the real world. Once there, however, most of his experiences make him yearn for home. Frank straddles the fence between desiring the security of home, Oz, and wanting to strike out on his own.
- Andrea (voiced by Shay Astar) is the daughter of Glinda, the Good Witch of the South. Andrea is quite beautiful, gentle and very aware of it. Andrea is not a witch but is a character always in conflict—she has magic abilities but isn't always certain how best to use them. Andrea is confident of her powers and likes to use them to her advantage. She is the least adept socially of the group and, often, she feels excluded from their activities. When she feels excluded, she often retaliates with some sort of magical prank. Andrea is a troublemaker but, at heart, really only wants to feel included. When pressed, Andrea is able to use her magic to help the group out of a mix-up—a mix-up which, more likely than not, she was the cause of. Her outfit is similar to Princess Ozma. Unlike Dot, Andrea is a girly witch, who enjoys cleaning, doing magic tricks and anything else girly. Relies more on her magic than her brains, but when she can't resort to her wand, she puts her mind to work.
- Dorothy (voiced by Erika Schickel) is Dot and Neddie's mother and Zeb's wife.
- Zeb (voiced by Ross Maplettoft) is Dot and Neddie's father and Dorothy's husband.
- Scarecrow Sr. (voiced by Andy Milder) is Scarecrow Jr.'s father.
- Tin Woodman (voiced by Steve Stoliar) is Tin Boy's father.
- Cowardly Lion is Boris and Bela's father.
- Jack Pumpkinhead Sr. (voiced by Ross Maplettoft) is Jack Pumpkinhead Jr.'s father.
- The Wizard of Oz (voiced by Steve Stoliar) is Frank's father.
- Glinda (voiced by Erika Schickel) is Andrea's mother.
- Scraps (voiced by Lori Alan): Has numerous infant patchwork kids, including a baby girl, Betty.
- Betty: Patchwork Girl's baby daughter.
- Rick (voiced by Lawrence Tierney (1996) and James Keane (1997)) is a homeless man living on the streets of Manhattan. He comes to the aid of the Oz children and they ask him to return to Oz with them. Once there, Rick finds the home, and friends, he has always desired. Rick is a man the world has treated unkindly but his response, in return, has never been one of anger or bitterness. He has always felt himself an outsider, until he came to Oz. Rick serves as a sort of advisor to the Scarecrow, he is very adept at solving disputes between citizens. Rick is very childlike and, because of this, is able to easily enter a child's world. Of all the adults in Oz, Rick feels the closest kinship with the children, he is often included in activities that, normally, adults would be excluded from or have little interest in. Rick is very grateful to the children for his new home and position, and is always eager to lend a hand in making their lives more enjoyable. Rick is quite resourceful whenever he finds the children in any sort of danger, he will come to their aid with great vigor.
- Santa Claus (voiced by Marc Allen Lewis) is a man who delivers presents on Christmas for boys and girls every year. He is kidnapped by two Awgwas along with Boris. So one of Santa's elves and the Oz Kids went to rescue them. The Oz Kids told him to come celebrate in the Land of Oz. When Santa arrived in Oz everyone celebrates and at the end he went home to deliver presents for all little boys and girls.
- Toby (voiced by Jarrett Lennon) is a young flying monkey.
- Gumpette (voiced by Jason Renfro) is a counterpart of the Gump, the kids often use him to fly because the Gump has left for a dentist appointment. The Gumpette has a Pat Buttram-sounding voice.

=== Villains ===
- Mombi (voiced by Darlene Cornley) is a bad witch who was banished for years and came back. She is trying to take over the land of Oz and stole Dot's magic belt so she can have everything she wants.
- Otto (voiced by Chauncey Leopardi) is the son of the Nome King. His father once tried to take over Oz but was outwitted by Dorothy and her companions and banished to an underground world below Oz. Otto desires vengeance for what he sees as wrongs done to his father by the Oz establishment. Otto lives in the cave and is told repeatedly by his father not to venture out or he's going to be grounded—advice he usually ignores. He slinks out on many occasions to cause as much trouble for the other children of Oz as possible. Otto often tries to turn the children against each other and is particularly interested in convincing Andrea to team up with him. Otto is usually outwitted in his attempts to wreak havoc but he always has another plan-of-attack waiting in the wings.

=== Additional voices ===
- Steve Stoliar – Hammerhead #1, Hammerhead #3, Joe, George the Bear, Husband, and Pilot
- Lori Alan – Mother, and Wife
- Lacey Chabert – Merla
- Scott McAfee – Scarecrow Jr. (1996–1997 and singing voice only in Christmas in Oz)
- Erika Schickel – Mother Crab and Mouse Queen
- Marc Allen Lewis – The Nome King, Hammerhead #2, Sea Dragon, and King Anko
- Andy Milder – Tommy Qwickstep, Snicklefritz, Vendor, Barnabas, Gwig, Octopus, and Yell-Maker
- Remy Ryan – Angie and Harriet
- Jarrett Lennon – Munchkin #1, Munchkin #3, Fred, Dragonettes, Pinkie the Bear, Pig, and Sacho
- Ross Maplettoft – Zog, Monkey King, Woozy, and Guards
- Claudia Christian – Queen Aquarine
- Art Chudabala – Wu Chen
- Johnathan Charles Kaplan – Monkey Prince and Freddie
- Ashley Malinger – Daughter and Clia
- Billy Mumy – Sam
- La Crystal Cooke – Henna
- Brian Ito – Hiro
- Miko Hughes – Teddy Bear
- Gabrielle Boni – Munchkin #2
- Michael Cade – Dungy
- John Link Graney – Billy
- Gavin Harrison – Crusty
- Peter MacNicol – Ork
- Frank Welker – Toto, Kalidahs (in The Nome Prince and the Magic Belt) and Dog-fish (in Journey Beneath the Sea)

== Reception ==
The cartoon series was criticized as a "pointless twist" babyfication spin-off.

== Episodes ==
No.	Title	Summary	Release date
1	Toto, Lost in New York	Andrea, daughter of Glinda, who dresses like Ozma, accidentally sends Toto to New York in a hot air balloon made by Frank. 8-year-old Kansas farm girl Dot Hugson, the leader of the Oz Kids, her 5-year-old brother Neddie Hugson and the other kids (Scarecrow Jr., Tin Boy, Boris, Bela, Jack Pumpkinhead Jr. and Frank) must follow the course set by Frank's computer to take them to him. When they arrive, their balloon is trashed, and they meet Rick, a homeless man who has adopted Toto. The strange appearance of some of the kids keeps plans to return from going smoothly, but are affected much more so by a clash of cultures.	October 1, 1996
2	The Nome Prince and the Magic Belt	Prince Otto finds one of Nome King's 1908 tunnels under Oz to the Emerald City. Boris accidentally opens a box that holds Dot's beloved magic belt. While the kids try to keep their parents from finding out what happened, Otto steals the belt and turns all of the Oz Kids except Dot and Andrea into glass figurines. It's up to Dot and Andrea to save their friends, get the Magic Belt back, and get back to the Emerald City before their parents find out!	October 1, 1996
3	Underground Adventure	An earthquake stirs up yet another adventure for Dot, Neddie and the Oz Kids. What begins as an innocent bus trip for Frank (the Wizard's son) turns into a wild underground ride for all the kids as they encounter dragonettes, merry-go-round mountains, an enormous teddy bear and more!	February 18, 1997
4	Who Stole Santa?	The Oz Kids and their new buddy, the elf Wisk, try to find St. Nick, who has been kidnapped. Can they team up with Jack Pumpkinhead Jr. and Andrea to find Santa before Christmas, which will arrive in just a few weeks?	October 1, 1996
5	Christmas in Oz	The Oz Kids' names are not included on the invite list for the upcoming Christmas celebration, Andrea and Otto try to teach the other party-goers a lesson. But will their plan backfire? Note: A sequel to Who Stole Santa. Christmas in Oz is also released on DVD. The characters from The Brave Little Toaster make a cameo in this episode.	October 1, 1996
6	The Monkey Prince	After reading one of Dot's fairy tales, Neddie programs the computer to take himself and Toto to China. Once there, they are met by the spoiled Monkey Prince who steals the computer. Unless Dot and the other Oz Kids can find them, Neddie and Toto Jr. will never get back to Emerald City, but it was all in a dream.	February 18, 1997
7	Journey Beneath the Sea	Jack Pumpkinhead, a pal of the Oz Kids, who wants to take a boat ride with all of his friends. During the ride, the boat begins to sink and Jack and the Oz Kids enter the water. There they discover two mermaids who take them on a magical and adventurous underwater excursion. When Zog and the sea devils try to ruin their fun, the adventure gets more wild and exciting than Dot, Neddie and the Oz Kids ever expected.	February 18, 1997
8	Virtual Oz	Prince Otto has no friends, so he decides to force Dot, Neddie and the Oz Kids into a virtual reality computer game presented to them at Scraps's baby shower. Unfortunately, Betty, the patchwork baby gets into the game and overflows the number of players, trapping them in a deteriorating program from which they have little chance of escape. Otto had no wish to actually harm them, and must try to get them out.	October 1, 1996
9	The Return of Mombi	Mombi, an evil witch, has returned to Emerald City, kidnapping the Oz adults, good witch Glinda and the Nome King! Now it's up to Dot, Neddie and the Oz Kids to save Oz from Mombi's dark powers.	February 18, 1997

== See also ==
- Adaptations of The Wizard of Oz – other adaptations of The Wonderful Wizard of Oz
