= Itsy Bitsy Spider (film) =

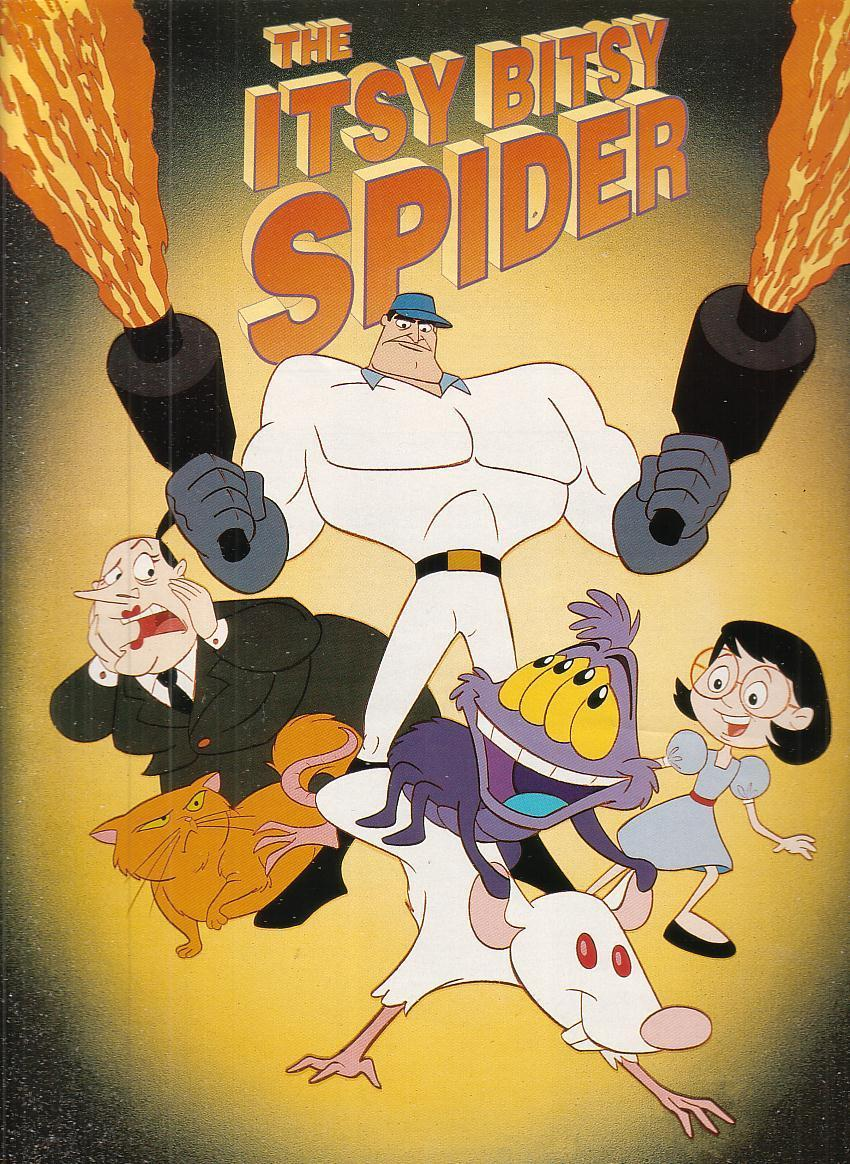
- Promotional poster from 1992
- Directed by: Matthew O'Callaghan
- Written by: Michael O'Donoghue; Jerry Rapp
- Based on: Itsy Bitsy Spider
- Produced by: Willard Carroll; Tom Wilhite
- Starring: Frank Welker; Thora Birch; Jim Carrey; Andrea Martin
- Edited by: Susan L. Vovsi
- Music by: David Newman
- Production company: Hyperion Animation
- Distributed by: Paramount Pictures
- Release date: July 31, 1992; (with Bebe's Kids)
- Running time: 7 minutes
- Country: United States
- Language: English

The Itsy Bitsy Spider is a 1992 American animated short film directed by Matthew O'Callaghan, and written by Michael O'Donoghue and Jerry Rapp. It stars Frank Welker as the titular spider, alongside Thora Birch, Jim Carrey, and Andrea Martin. Based on the eponymous rhyme, the short film was released along with the film Bebe's Kids. It was rated PG by the MPAA for sci-fi cartoon violence.

It is a family-friendly version of The Terminator and RoboCop, and was the basis for the television series of the same name, which aired on the USA Network.

== Plot ==
A young country spider; the Itsy Bitsy Spider, befriends Leslie McGroarty, a perky young city girl taking piano lessons from a music teacher, Adrienne Van Leydon (incidentally learning to play the song) and her cat, Langston. When Itsy frightens Andrienne, she calls the Exterminator, who tries to kill Itsy with a toxic machine blower, but it causes pain and destruction to the instructor's house. The Exterminator turns out to be a heavily armed android, who then uses more extreme weapons, escalating from poison and vacuums to guns and explosives, before destroying the house. Itsy reunites with Leslie (who senses to leave the house when the Exterminator uses the weapons) and heads home to the big city on her bicycle.

== Cast ==
- Frank Welker as The Itsy Bitsy Spider, Langston the Cat and Mouse
- Thora Birch as The Little Girl (named Leslie McGroarty in the television series)
- Jim Carrey as The Exterminator
- Andrea Martin as The Music Teacher (named Adrienne Van Leydon in the television series)
