= Hyperion Pictures =

American film production and distribution company

- Industry: Filmmaking
- Founded: December 25, 1984; 41 years ago
- Headquarters: Los Angeles, California
- Key people: Thomas L. Wilhite; Willard Carroll; Chris Young
- Subsidiaries: Hyperion Animation; Jambalaya Studios
- Website: hyperionpictures.com

Hyperion Pictures (also known as Hyperion Films, Hyperion Studios and Hyperion Entertainment) is an American independent film production and distribution company founded by Thomas L. Wilhite, who had previously been the head of motion picture and television production for The Walt Disney Company, and writer/director Willard Carroll. The company produces both live-action and animated productions such as The Brave Little Toaster and The Runestone.

== History ==
A subsidiary of the company is Hyperion Animation Company, Inc. which has produced animated feature films and television series, including its most successful media franchises: The Brave Little Toaster, The Brave Little Toaster Goes to Mars, The Brave Little Toaster to the Rescue, The Itsy Bitsy Spider and The Oz Kids. In 1998, the company produced the live-action film Playing by Heart for Miramax. Also, on December 9, 1998, it signed a deal with Showtime in order to develop a telefilm based on the hit book series Bad News Ballet.

On October 5, 1999, Hyperion, along with Disney's animation designer Bruce W. Smith, formed a joint venture called Jambalaya Studio to produce shows aimed at a black audience. On September 22, 2002, Hyperion Pictures decided to expand into a memoir and a series of pulp novels into feature film production.

The studio has been dormant since 2007, but their website was updated in 2019, stating that it was under construction. It then returned a year later. However, it was not involved with The Proud Family: Louder and Prouder.

=== Accolades ===
The first Brave Little Toaster received an Primetime Emmy Award for Outstanding Animated Program nomination and a Special Jury recognition from the Sundance Film Festival.

== List of notable Hyperion features and television productions ==
=== Feature films ===
- Nutcracker: The Motion Picture (1986, with The Kushner-Locke Company)
- The Runestone (1990)
- Playing by Heart (1998, with Miramax)
- Tom's Midnight Garden (1999)
- My Louisiana Sky (2001)
- Three Way (2004, with Brainstorm Media)
- Marigold (2007)

=== Short films ===
- Chunks of Life (1994, with MTV)
- The Need (2006)

=== Television series ===
- Amazing Stories (1985–1987) - Season 2, Episode 16: "Family Dog" (1987, with NBC, Universal Television, Amblin Entertainment and The Kushner-Locke Company)
- Bone Chillers (1996, with ABC)
- ARK, the Adventures of Animal Rescue Kids (1997–1998, with Discovery Kids)

== List of Hyperion Animation productions ==
=== Television series ===
Title	Year(s)	Network	Co-production(s)	Notes
The Itsy Bitsy Spider	1993–1996	USA Network	Paramount Television	
Life with Louie	1994–1998	Fox Kids	Fox Children's Productions; The Anderson/Hassan Company	
The Adventures of Hyperman	1995–1996	CBS	Columbia TriStar Television; Illumination Studios	
Happily Ever After: Fairy Tales for Every Child	1995–2000	HBO	Two Oceans Entertainment Group; Confetti Entertainment Company	
The Oz Kids	1996–1997	Direct-to-video	Meldac; Canal + D.A. Wang Film Productions	
The Proud Family	2001–2005	Disney Channel; ABC Kids	Walt Disney Television Animation; Jambalaya Studios	
Da Boom Crew	2004	Kids' WB	Berliner Film Company; Jambalaya Studios	

=== Television specials ===
Title	Release date	Network	Co-production(s)	Notes
The Sissy Duckling	1999	HBO		

=== Television films ===
Title	Release date	Network	Co-production(s)	Notes
The Proud Family Movie	2005	Disney Channel	Walt Disney Television Animation; Jambalaya Studios	

=== Direct-to-video films ===
Title	Release date	Co-production(s)	Notes
The Brave Little Toaster to the Rescue	1997	Walt Disney Home Video; The Kushner-Locke Company	
The Brave Little Toaster Goes to Mars	1998	Walt Disney Home Video; The Kushner-Locke Company	
We Wish You a Merry Christmas	1999	Family Home Entertainment	
Jingle Bells	1999	Family Home Entertainment	
O' Christmas Tree	1999	Family Home Entertainment	
The Tangerine Bear: Home in Time for Christmas!	2000	Artisan Entertainment	
The Adventures of Tom Thumb and Thumbelina	2002	Miramax Films	

=== Theatrical films ===
Title	Release date	Co-production(s)	Notes
The Brave Little Toaster	1987	The Kushner-Locke Company	
Rover Dangerfield	1991	Warner Bros. Pictures; The Kushner-Locke Company	
Robin Harris' Bebe's Kids	1992	Paramount Pictures; Jambalaya Studios	

=== Short films ===
Title	Release date	Co-production(s)	Notes
The Itsy Bitsy Spider	1992	Paramount Pictures	
1001 Nights: An Animation Symphony	1998	Los Angeles Philharmonic Orchestra	
