= Chris Young (actor) =

American actor (born 1971)

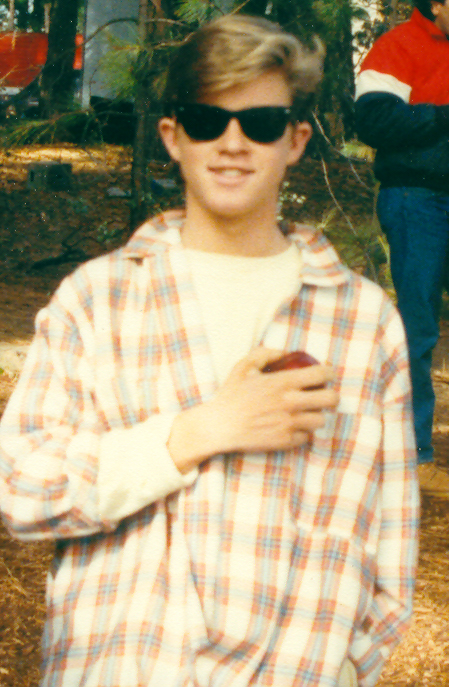
- Young in 1987 on the set of The Great Outdoors
- Born: Christopher Tyler Young; April 28, 1971 (age 55)
- Occupation: Actor
- Years active: 1985–2024
- Website: chrisyoung.com

Chris Young (born April 28, 1971) is an American former actor – best known for portraying child prodigy computer hacker Bryce Lynch in the Max Headroom series (1987–1988) – and entertainment executive.

== Life and career ==
Young's show business career started at the age of fifteen when he played Bryce Lynch, a child computer hacker prodigy, in the Max Headroom science fiction television series. He worked in many other television shows and films, portraying Buckley "Buck" Ripley in She's Having a Baby and The Great Outdoors (both 1988), and voicing Rob in The Brave Little Toaster to the Rescue (1997) and The Brave Little Toaster Goes to Mars (1998).

Young later went on to work at Nickelodeon, first as a producer at the Nickelodeon Animation Studio, and then as Executive Creative Director, Nickelodeon Animation Lab. In 2017, he was appointed Senior Vice President in charge of the Nickelodeon Entertainment Lab, and ran it until the unit was closed in 2020.

== Filmography ==
Year	Title	Role	Notes
1987–1988	Max Headroom	Bryce Lynch	14 episodes
1988	Jake's Journey	Jake	Television movie
1988	She's Having a Baby	Buckley "Buck" Ripley	Uncredited
1988	The Great Outdoors	Buckley "Buck" Ripley	
1988	Dance 'til Dawn	Dan Lefcourt	Television movie
1989	Live-In	Danny Mathews	9 episodes
1989	Falcon Crest	Chris Agretti	4 episodes
1990	The Runestone	Jacob	
1990	Book of Love	Jack Twiller	
1990–1991	Married People	Allen Campbell	18 episodes
1991	December	Stuart Brayton	
1992	Breaking the Silence	Kenny Becker	Television movie
1993	Crime & Punishment		Episode: "Our Denial"
1993	Warlock: The Armageddon	Kenny Travis	
1994	In the Living Years	Crispy	Alternative title: Letter to Dad
1994	PCU	Tom Lawrence	
1994	MacShayne: The Final Roll of the Dice	Bernard Pinsky	Television movie
1994	Runaway Daughters	Bob Randolph	Television movie
1995	Deep Down	Andy	Alternative title: Conversations in Public Places
1995	Friends	Steven Fishman	Episode: "The One with Five Steaks and an Eggplant"
1995	Dave's World	Smitty	Episode: "Leave a Mystery at the Beep"
1996	Minor Adjustments	Brandon	Episode: "My Fair Darby"
1996	Married... with Children	Jackson	Episode: "Enemies"
1997	Life with Louie	Voice roles	3 episodes
1997	Killing Mr. Griffin	Jeff	Television movie Co-producer
1997	Step By Step	Chip Dahlgren	Episode: "Goodbye, Mr. Chip"
1997	The Brave Little Toaster to the Rescue	Rob (Voice)	Direct-to-video release
1998	The Brave Little Toaster Goes to Mars	Rob (Voice)	Direct-to-video release
1998	1001 Nights	–	Co-producer
1998	The Adventures of A.R.K.	–	Director, unknown episodes
1999	Falling Sky	Kyle	
1999–2000	The New Adventures of A.R.K.	–	Director, 9 episodes
2005	The Proud Family Movie	–	Television movie Producer
2006	The Need	–	Director
