= The Itsy Bitsy Spider (TV series) =

American animated fantasy-comedy 1993–1996

- Genre: Adventure; Fantasy; Slapstick
- Created by: Matthew O'Callaghan
- Directed by: Conrad Vernon; Mike Mitchell; Stephen Anderson
- Voices of: Francesca Marie Smith; Frank Welker; Matt Frewer; Charlotte Rae; Jonathan Taylor Thomas
- Music by: Michael Muhlfriedel
- Country of origin: United States
- Original language: English
- No. of seasons: 2
- No. of episodes: 26

Production
- Production companies: Hyperion Animation; Paramount Television

Original release
- Network: USA Network
- Release: October 31, 1993 – September 15, 1996

The Itsy Bitsy Spider is a 1993–1996 American animated fantasy comedy television series. It was based on the Itsy Bitsy Spider short film produced by Hyperion Animation. It was broadcast on the USA Network's USA Cartoon Express. 26 episodes were produced over two seasons for three years.

== Overview ==
The series revolves around a young girl named Leslie McGroarty who is befriended by a four-eyed spider named Itsy, and two adversaries, the Exterminator and her music teacher Adrienne. The series centers mainly on the Exterminator's futile attempts to rid the world of the arachnid pest his job calls for.

== Characters ==
- Leslie McGroarty (voiced by Francesca Marie Smith) is a lively, imaginative, cute and playful young city girl. Leslie liked all of the things such as bicycling, skateboarding, studying karate, insects, eating candy and other masculine things. Leslie has short black hair. She wears circular shaped glasses, a light blue dress with puffed sleeves and a red belt, white socks and black Mary Janes. Leslie had the magical ability to shrink herself to insect size. She is the protagonist of the series.
- Itsy Bitsy (voiced by Frank Welker) is a harmless farm spider. He is Leslie's best friend. Itsy Bitsy is also the protagonist of the short film. According to an episode, "Miss Muffet Roughs It", Itsy was a toddler with his parents, living in his farm life. Frank Welker also voices Adrienne's evil pet cat, Langston.
- Adrienne Van Leydon (voiced by Charlotte Rae) is the main antagonist of the series.
- The Exterminator (voiced by Matt Frewer) is the secondary antagonist of the series and Itsy's arch-nemesis.
- George (voiced by Jonathan Taylor Thomas) is Leslie's love interest.

== Episodes ==
=== Season 1 ===
1. One Flew Over the Spider's Web
2. Itsy Gets Cooking
3. Enter the Spider
4. Troop Itsy
5. Garden of Itsy
6. The Bug Shops Here
7. Itsy Ships Out
8. Big Top Itsy
9. Downhill Itsy
10. Itsy Does Hollywood
11. Miss Muffet Roughs It
12. Nutcracker Cha-Cha-Cha
13. Basic Insect

=== Season 2 ===
1. Spider in Spurs
2. Itsy's Favorite Haunt
3. Code Purple
4. Beach Blanket Spider
5. Big Time Spider
6. Deep Space Spider
7. Short Order Spider
8. Spider Sense
9. It's a Zoo Itsy
10. State Fair Itsy
11. Spider at Work
12. Something Fore Itsy
13. Sugar Coated Spider

== International broadcasts ==
Country	Channel	Year
US	USA Network	1993–1996
Nordics	Nickelodeon	1996–1999
Israel	Kids' Channel	Late 1990s
Asia	STAR Plus	1994–1997
UK	BBC One; BBC Two	1995-2002
