= Willard Carroll =

American producer, writer, director, and animator (born 1955)

- Born: November 12, 1955 (age 70); Easton, Maryland, U.S.
- Occupations: Producer; writer; director; animator
- Years active: 1983–2007
- Television: The Proud Family

Willard F. Carroll (born November 12, 1955, in Easton, Maryland) is an American producer, writer, director, and animator.

== Career ==
He was an executive producer for the animated films The Brave Little Toaster (1987), The Brave Little Toaster Goes to Mars (1998) and The Brave Little Toaster to the Rescue (1997), also writing the screenplay for the latter two.

He wrote and directed the Ragnarok-themed film The Runestone (1991), the ensemble romance, Playing by Heart (1998), the British fantasy Tom's Midnight Garden (1999) and the Bollywood pastiche Marigold (2007). Playing by Heart was entered into the 49th Berlin International Film Festival.

An ardent fan of the Land of Oz, Carroll is recognized as having the largest privately held collection of Oz memorabilia in the world, comprising more than 100,000 items. Several books, including The Wizard of Oz Collectors' Treasury and All Things Oz, have been published displaying parts of his collection, which includes the Wicked Witch of the West's hourglass from the 1939 film. He also wrote and produced the animated direct-to-video series The Oz Kids.

He established Hyperion Pictures with Tom Wilhite.

== Filmography ==
=== Director ===
- 1991 - The Runestone
- 1998 - Playing by Heart
- 1999 - Tom's Midnight Garden
- 2007 - Marigold

=== Writer ===
- The Successor (1996)
