= LED chandelier =

LED chandeliers are either normal chandeliers that have been retrofitted with LED bulbs, or contemporary designs that use light emitting diodes and acrylic or crystals.

== Usage ==
LED chandeliers are used for both functional and decorative lighting in various settings, such as homes, hotels, restaurants, and other commercial spaces. It offers several advantages over traditional chandeliers, including energy efficiency, longer lifespan, and a wide range of design options.

LED chandeliers come in various designs, styles, and sizes, allowing for customization to suit different preferences and interior aesthetics.

== Efficiency ==
LED technology allows for the production of bright and focused light while consuming less energy compared to traditional incandescent or fluorescent bulbs. This energy efficiency contributes to a more sustainable and environmentally friendly lighting solution.

LED chandeliers also have a longer lifespan compared to traditional lighting options. LED bulbs can last up to 25 times longer, reducing the frequency of bulb replacements and maintenance efforts.

The largest LED Chandelier is 65 feet long and 32 feet wide which is in a shopping mall in Trinidad and Tobago.

== See also ==
- Gooseneck lamp
- LED stage lighting
