= The Brave Little Toaster (novel) =

1980 novella by Thomas M. Disch

- The first publication cover of Thomas M. Disch's The Brave Little Toaster, art by Gahan Wilson.
- Author: Thomas M. Disch
- Language: English
- Published: August 15, 1980
- Publication place: United States

The Brave Little Toaster is a 1980 novella by American science fiction writer and poet Thomas M. Disch intended for children or, as put by the author, a "bedtime story for small appliances". The story centers on a group of five household appliances—a tensor lamp stand, an electric blanket, an AM radio alarm clock, a vacuum cleaner and a toaster—on their quest to find their original owner referred to as the Master.

== Plot summary ==
The story opens with a description of five members of a family of minor home appliances left in the cottage, listed from oldest to youngest. They are each given a personality. As the oldest, the vacuum cleaner is steady and dependable, the plastic AM radio alarm clock, the yellow electric blanket (cheerful), the tensor lamp stand (somewhat neurotic whether it, as an incentive from a savings bank, was better than a store-bought equivalent) and the Sunbeam toaster (bright). The cottage itself is on the northernmost edge of an immense forest and the appliances have grown used to seasonal use, with some of the master's other appliances (such as the black and white television set, the blender, the oral irrigator, the telephone, the stereo system and the world clock) annually returning to the city with their master each Labor Day.

One spring day, after "two years, five months, and thirteen days" without the master, though, the appliances begin to suspect they have been abandoned. A few months later, the toaster tells the others "We need people to take care of, and we need people to take care of us" and retells the story of an abandoned dog who had accidentally been left behind in a summer cottage, like themselves, but still "found his way to his master, hundreds of miles away". The appliances plan to do the same as soon as they can all travel safely together. Although the Hoover, while being strong and self-propelled, could take the other appliances, it still needed a source of power other than the wall outlet.

But before any of the small appliances who may be listening to this tale should begin to think that they might do the same thing, let them be warned: ELECTRICITY IS VERY DANGEROUS. Never play with old batteries! Never put your plug in a strange socket! And if you are in any doubt about the voltage of the current where you are living, ask a major appliance.

Their transportation needs are solved by fitting an old metal office chair with casters from the bed upstairs and rigging it with an old automotive battery from the Volkswagen Beetle to power the hoover, who will tow the other appliances. Suitably equipped, they set out through the woods since, even though the highway would otherwise be faster, "whenever human beings are observing them they must remain perfectly still".

During their first afternoon in the woods, the appliances stop to rest in a meadow after a brief rainstorm. The toaster is surprised by a daisy who speaks only in verse ("daisies, being among the simpler flowers, characteristically employ a rough sort of octosyllabic doggerel") to declare its love for the toaster, having fallen in love with its reflection in the toaster's chrome side. As the toaster excuses itself to rejoin its appliance friends, the daisy begs the toaster to "Pluck me and take me where you're bound. / I cannot live without you here: / Then let your bosom be my bier". Shocked, the toaster leaves the daisy in the ground and returns to the appliances, where the blanket folds itself into a tent to shelter the others.

The next night the appliances run into Harold and Marjorie, married squirrels. The squirrels and appliances have an awkward encounter when the squirrels first ask what gender the appliances are (they aren't), followed by an exchange of inappropriate jokes which neither group find funny. During the night, another rainstorm blows the blanket into the trees above, where it is stuck until the squirrels help it down the following morning. To thank the squirrels for their help, the toaster roasts some nuts, and the blanket plugs into the battery to dry out and warm the squirrels.

After leaving the squirrels, the journey of the appliances comes to an abrupt stop at the unexpected obstacle of a wide river. The hoover suffers a panic attack and starts chewing its own cord, calming down only after the toaster led the hoover back and forth across the grassy bank of the river in regular carpet-sweeping swathes. The appliances consult a map and discovering how close they are now to the city where their master lives, excitedly hatch a plan to follow the river until they find a bridge to cross it and then, as the toaster explains, "when it's very late and there's no traffic, we can make a dash for it!" Once they begin their search for a crossing, the chair overturns after one leg gets stuck in mud and one caster comes off.

As the appliances search for the lost caster, the blanket discovers a boat, which the hoover declares they will use to cross the river. The toaster objects, saying this makes them no better than pirates, who "are the bane of an appliance's existence, since once an appliance has been spirited away by a pirate, it has no choice but to serve its bidding just as though it were that appliance's legitimate master. [...] Truly, there is no fate, even obsolescence, so terrible as falling into the hands of pirates". As the toaster continues to argue with the other four appliances, who have already boarded the boat, the owner of the boat returns and, thinking that whoever had placed the appliances in the boat was intending to steal his boat, decides to retaliate by stealing the appliances instead. After taking the battery off to save it, the pirate throws the office chair into the river, then takes them to his home across the river at the City Dump.

The Dump itself is likened to a graveyard for defective and obsolescent appliances, a horrible vision of rusted junk and broken parts. The pirate reviews the condition of each appliance and declares them junk one-by-one, discarding all save the radio, which he takes into his shack. Outside the shack, the appliances hatch a plan to frighten the pirate so they can rescue the radio, who has been playing cheerful tunes, in what the toaster believes is a deliberate attempt to keep them optimistic, especially since one of the songs was "I Whistle a Happy Tune", the toaster's favorite. The appliances outside also find a baby buggy in good repair, which they plan to use to complete their journey.

They pose as a ghost, with the blanket shrouding the toaster, perched atop the hoover. It makes ghostly noises to lure the pirate out of his shack, and at the instant he looks at the hooded figure, the lamp turns on and the pirate sees his face reflected in the toaster's chrome side. The pirate, upon seeing his corrupted reflection, concludes the ghost is "the kind that understand exactly who we are and knows all the wrong things we've done and intends to punish us for them" and flees in terror. Before he returns, the appliances escape in the buggy to where their master lives, only a mile or so from the Dump.

At the apartment on Newton Avenue, the appliances are greeted by their appliance friends, old and new, where they learn the master has not returned to the cottage because of his new companion (referred to as "the mistress"), who has caused them to move their vacations from the cottage, "where there is bound to be ragweed and pollen and such" which would exacerbate the mistress's hay fever, to the seaside, and further, the master intends to sell the cottage, along with the appliances inside. While deciding what to do next, the five appliances spend the night in the apartment, where the Singer sewing machine repairs the rips in the blanket and the toaster tells the tale of their long journey.

The next afternoon, with the five appliances freshly cleaned, they listen to the radio program The Swap Shop, which advertises the five appliances are available if "you should have a real and genuine need for all five of these fine appliances, since their present owner wants them to be able to stay together. For sentimental reasons!" It is the toaster's final plan to help the group of five, and the first to call is "an elderly, impoverished ballerina" from Center Street who trades five black-and-white kittens for the five appliances. Although the mistress is allergic to cat fur, she decides to take more antihistamines and keep the cats. The five appliances "lived and worked, happy and fulfilled, serving their dear mistress and enjoying each other's companionship, to the end of their days".

== Development ==
The second publication cover, art by Karen Lee Schmidt.

The story first appeared as a novella in the August 1980 issue of The Magazine of Fantasy and Science Fiction. Although appearing in a general circulation magazine, the story was written in the style of a children's fable. It was one of the most popular science fiction and fantasy stories of the early 1980s and nominated for both a Hugo Award and a Nebula Award for Best Novella. It also won a Locus Award, Seiun Award and British SF Association Award. It was later published as a book in May 1986.

Disch said that he was unable to publish the story as a children's book at first, because publishers thought the concept of talking appliances was too "far-fetched", even after Disch had sold it to Disney as a film; Doubleday finally published it as a part of a five-book contract.

== Reception ==
The Brave Little Toaster was well received by critics. Anna Quindlen, while writing for The New York Times, called it "a wonderful book for a certain sort of eccentric adult. You know who you are. Buy it for your children; read it yourself" and also suggested that the book lacked a clearly defined audience.

=== Awards and honors ===
Year	Category	Award	Result
1980	Best Short Fiction	BSFA	Won
1980	Best Novella	Nebula	Nominated
1981	Best Novelette	Locus	Won
1981	Best Novella	Hugo	Nominated
1981	Short Fiction	Balrog	Nominated
1982	Foreign Short Story	Seiun	Won

== Film adaptations and sequels ==
John Lasseter learned about the novella from a friend and convinced Tom Wilhite to purchase the film rights in the early 1980s for Disney. Lasseter pitched a 30-second clip, featuring traditional two-dimensional cel animation with three-dimensional computer-generated backgrounds to Disney executives in 1983, but was told that since the cost and time savings over an animated film made through traditional methods were negligible, they were not interested in pursuing the project. As Lasseter recalled years later, he had gone around some of his direct superiors in his enthusiasm to pitch the project, making enemies in doing so, and he was fired from Disney ten minutes after his pitch was rejected. The Disney Newsreel, an internal newsletter, highlighted the work of Lasseter and Glen Keane in June 1983, describing the process of animating scenes from Where the Wild Things Are as a test for the future Brave Little Toaster film.

In 1987, the novel was adapted by Disch and Joe Ranft as a conventionally animated feature film under Hyperion Pictures, which was founded by Wilhite. The film contains many differences from the book but is essentially the same story, although the ending differs. In the novel, the appliances trade themselves away to an old ballerina who needs them, while in the film, they are reunited with their former master (named "Rob" in the film).

Disch later wrote a sequel titled The Brave Little Toaster Goes to Mars in which the Brave Little Toaster and his companions travel to Mars to stop an invasion from hostile appliances who have a colony there. This too was made into a film. There was also a third film in the series named The Brave Little Toaster to the Rescue, which is set chronologically between the two books, but is not based directly on one.

=== Printed versions ===
Novella

- — (August 1980). "The Brave Little Toaster: A Bedtime Story for Small Appliances". The Magazine of Fantasy & Science Fiction. (magazine publication)
  - — (March 1981). "Il Bravo Piccolo Tostapane". Urania. No. 878. (Italian translation)
  - — (May 1981). "Le brave petit grille-pain". Fiction. No. 318. Translated by Lemoine, Daniel. (French translation)
  - — (November 1981). "Le valiant petit grille-pain". Thomas M. Dish: anthologie réunie et prés. par Patrice Duvic. Translated by Pugi, Jean-Pierre. Presses Pocket. ISBN 2-266-00995-8. (paperback anthology with French translation)
  - — (December 1981). "いさましいちびのトースター". SF Magazine. Translated by 浅倉久志 (Asakura Hisashi). (Japanese translation)
  - — (1982). "Tapferer kleiner Toaster". Fenster. Translated by Winter, Biggy. Heyne. ISBN 3-453-30752-6. (paperback anthology with German translation)
  - Ferman, Edward L., ed. (1982). The Best from Fantasy and Science Fiction: 24th Series. Scribner. ISBN 978-0-684-17490-7. (hardcover anthology reprint of novella)
  - Ferman, Edward L., ed. (1983). The Best from Fantasy and Science Fiction: 24th Series. Ace Books. ISBN 978-0-441-05485-5. (paperback anthology reprint of novella)
  - — (1984). "Il bravo piccolo tostapane. Una favola per elettrodomestici". La Signora degli scarafaggi e altri 22 racconti. Arnoldo Mondadori. (paperback anthology with Italian translation)

Chapter books

- — Schmidt, Karen (illus). (1986). The Brave Little Toaster: A Bedtime Story for Small Appliances. Doubleday. ISBN 978-0-385-23050-6. (book publication)
  - — Schmidt, Karen (illus). (1986). The Brave Little Toaster: A Bedtime Story for Small Appliances. Grafton Books. ISBN 978-0-246-13080-8. (UK book publication) UPC 780246 130808
- — (1988). The Brave Little Toaster Goes to Mars. Doubleday. ISBN 978-0-385-24162-5.

=== Film adaptations ===
- The Brave Little Toaster, 1987 (adaptation of the novel)
- The Brave Little Toaster to the Rescue, 1997 (not based on printed work)
- The Brave Little Toaster Goes to Mars, 1998 (adaptation of the novel)

== Characters ==
The Toaster
A gallant Sunbeam pop-up two-slice toaster.
The Lamp
A tensor gooseneck desktop lamp stand that shines a bright light from his light bulb.
The Electric Blanket
A shy but cheerful yellow electric blanket with a childlike manner.
The AM Radio Alarm Clock
An off-white plastic vacuum-tube-based prototype amplitude modulation radiotelegraphic alarm clock.
The Old Vacuum Cleaner
A big, strong hoover upright vacuum cleaner.
The Daisy
A daisy who can only speak in verse. She mistakes her reflection in the toaster as her male counterpart and falls in love.
Harold and Marjorie
A pair of squirrels whom the appliances meet in the forest. They help the blanket out of a tree after being blown away in a storm. They are unable to comprehend the idea of appliances or the fact that they have no gender, although they are fascinated by the blanket's warmth and the toaster's ability to roast acorns.
The Pirate
A man who finds the appliances (just as they are about to use his boat to cross a river). He takes them back to the city dump by throwing all of the appliances, except the Radio, into the heap. The toaster plans an escape for them all by having the four of them pretend to be a ghost and scare the man away.
The Master
The former owner of the five appliances, whom they all revere. The appliances eventually learn that he has a mistress, and that they spend their holidays out at sea instead of the cottage because of the woman's hay fever. They also learn that the cottage will be sold and they will each be auctioned off soon. Coming to terms with having fulfilled their duty for the master, they look for a new home where they will be needed and can stay together.
The Ballerina
A woman who trades the appliances on a radio show for her kittens.
