= Korg VC-10 =

Analogue vocoder

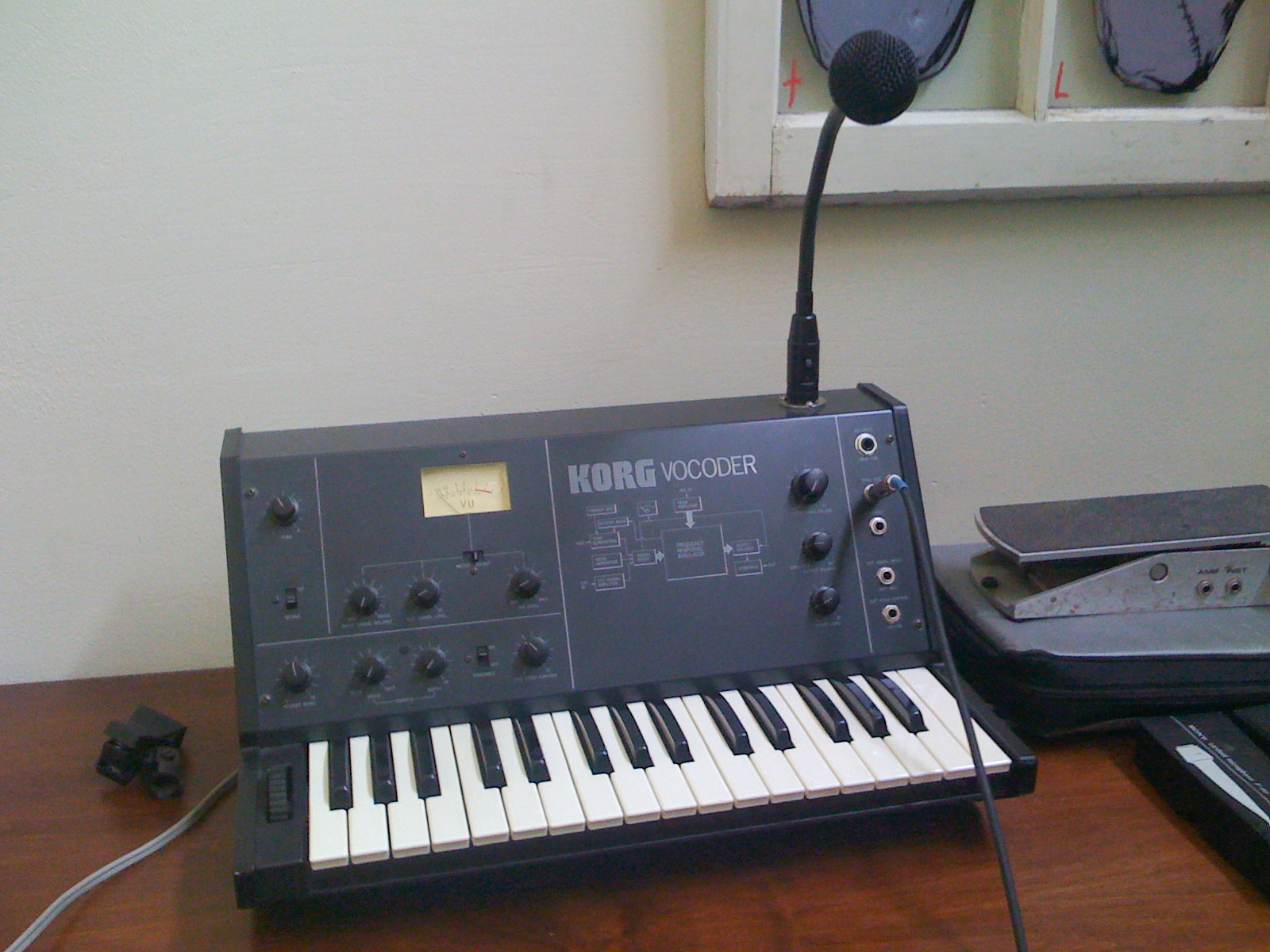
Korg VC-10 vocoder

The Korg VC-10 is an analog vocoder released by Korg in 1978. It was Korg's first vocoder and unlike many vocoders, the VC-10 includes a built-in polyphonic tone source that can be played via its 32-note keyboard. When a microphone signal is mixed with the internal sound generator, it supports basic vocoding, a process that allows for the modulation of a synthesizer's sound with the characteristics of a human voice to create distinct electronic effects. Introduced in 1978, it was priced at $1,299, excluding the microphone.

It gained popularity in the 1970s following utilisation by bands such as Kraftwerk and Electric Light Orchestra.

== Sounds and features ==
The VC-10 features a 20-band analyzer, a 20-band EQ, and an internal divide-down synthesizer for tone generation. Additionally, it can process external signals using the ensemble effect from the Korg PS-series, enabling the transformation of basic sounds into rich textures.

It features 32-note polyphony with one oscillator per key, all individually tuneable, accent bend control which adds a slight pitch wavering effect so that the sound produced is more like a human voice, octave-up control which extends the range of the keyboard, and tune control as well as various settings relating to input and output mix. The VC-10 allows for an input from an external signal carrier, such as an electric guitar, to be modulated by the keyboard. It also features an external pitch control input.

The VC-10 achieved a measure of popularity because it was simple to use, relatively inexpensive and completely self-contained.

The unit was originally supplied with a gooseneck microphone called the Korg MC-01 which plugged into a bespoke BTS connector. This type of connector was phased out when XLR became the standard and is now obsolete. It is difficult to source a microphone that will connect to it but TOA still (as of July 2025) makes a compatible model, the DM-524B. The VC-10 also has a front panel standard microphone 1/4" input jack.
