= Gooseneck (fixture) =

Flexible joining element

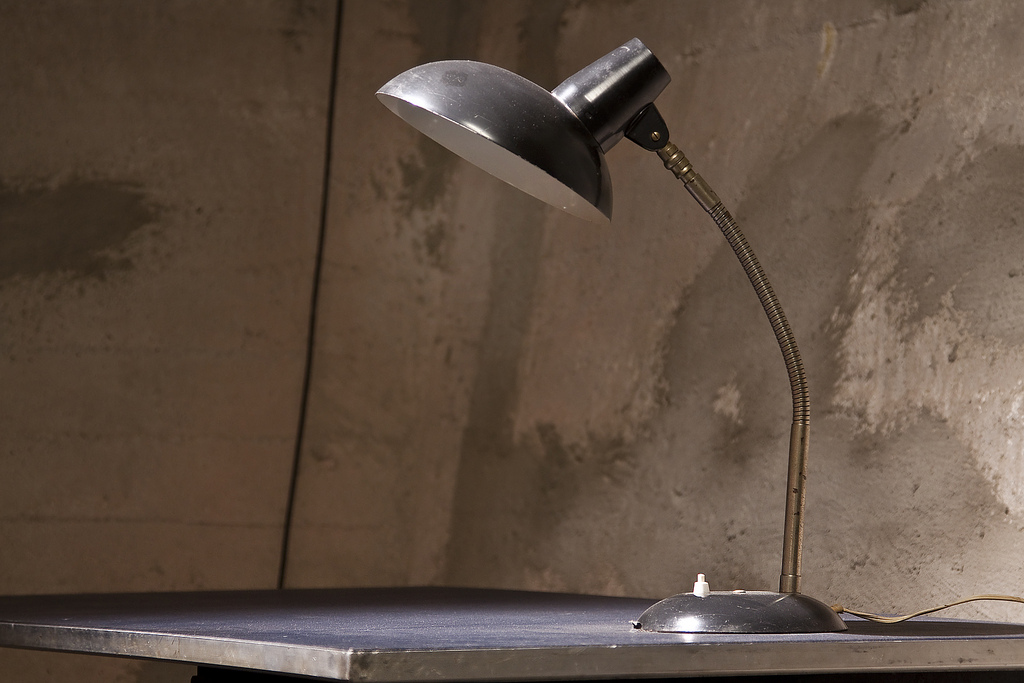
A lamp using a gooseneck (gooseneck lamp)

A gooseneck is a semi-rigid, flexible joining element made from a coiled metal hose. Similar to its natural counterpart, it can be bent in almost any direction and remain in that position. Areas of application for goosenecks are movable brackets for lights, magnifying glasses, microphones and other devices. The hollow shape of the gooseneck allows electrical cables or fiber-optic cables to be accommodated inside, for example.

== Construction ==
A gooseneck contains a wire with a round cross-section inside, which is shaped like a spring in the shape of a helix. A wire with a triangular cross-section is wound around this, so that the tips of the triangle protrude between the round wires into the inner spiral. If the gooseneck is bent in one direction, the distance between the round wires is slightly larger on the outside and slightly smaller on the inside. Correspondingly, the tips of the triangles slip outside between the round wires or are pushed out inside. The bend in the gooseneck is retained due to the friction between the inner spiral and the outer casing, so that the gooseneck remains in the set position.

Inside view and schematics

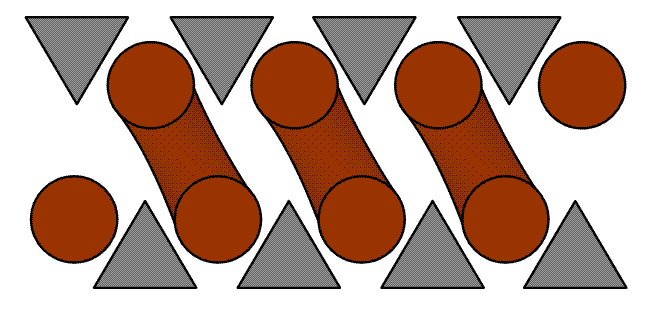
straight

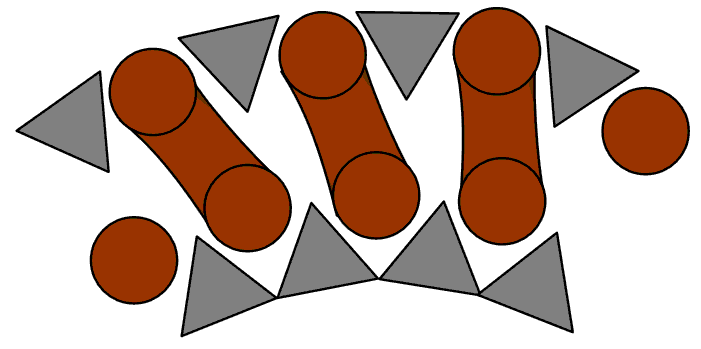
curved

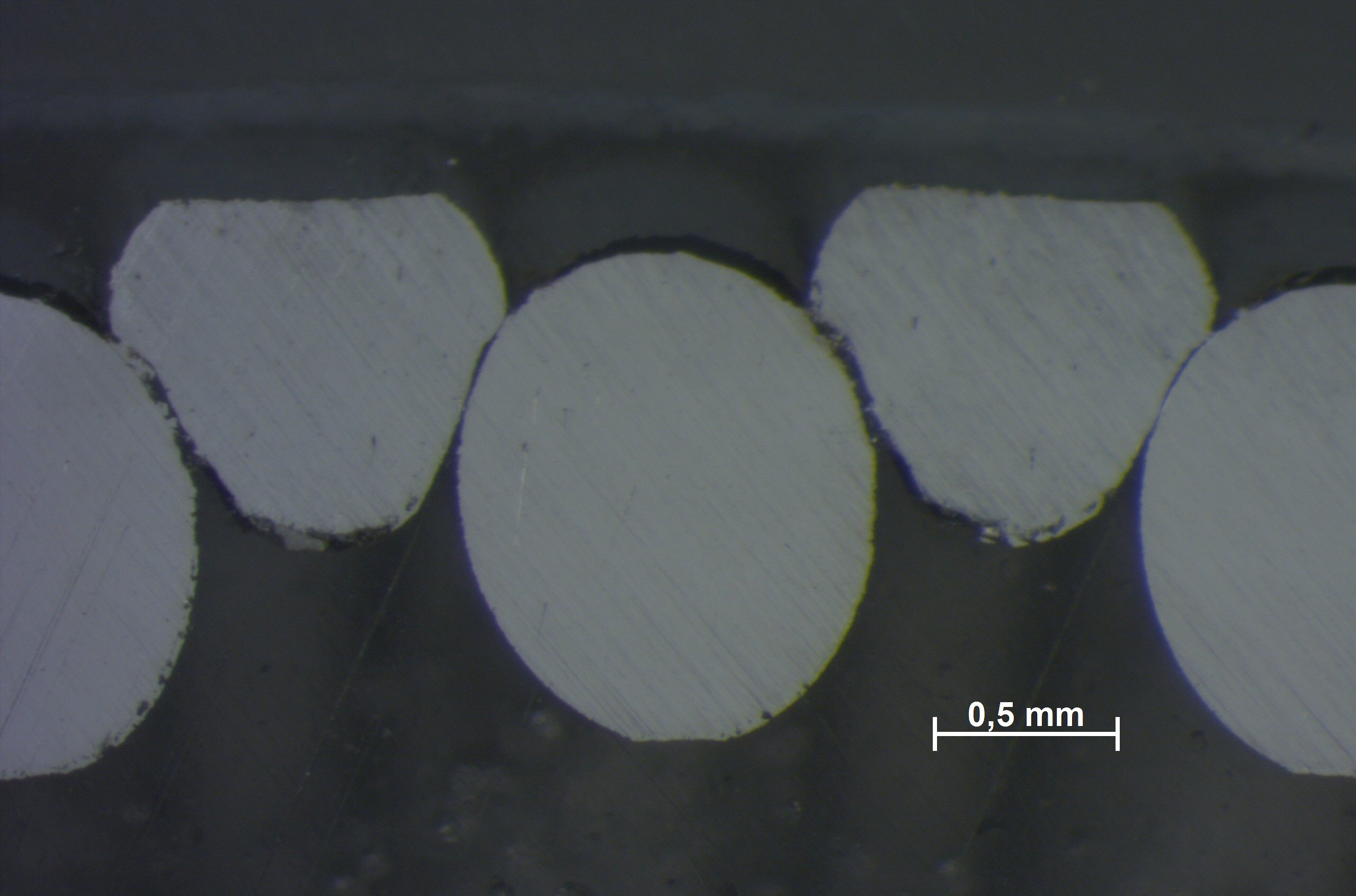
Outer wire pushed between round wire (outer bend)

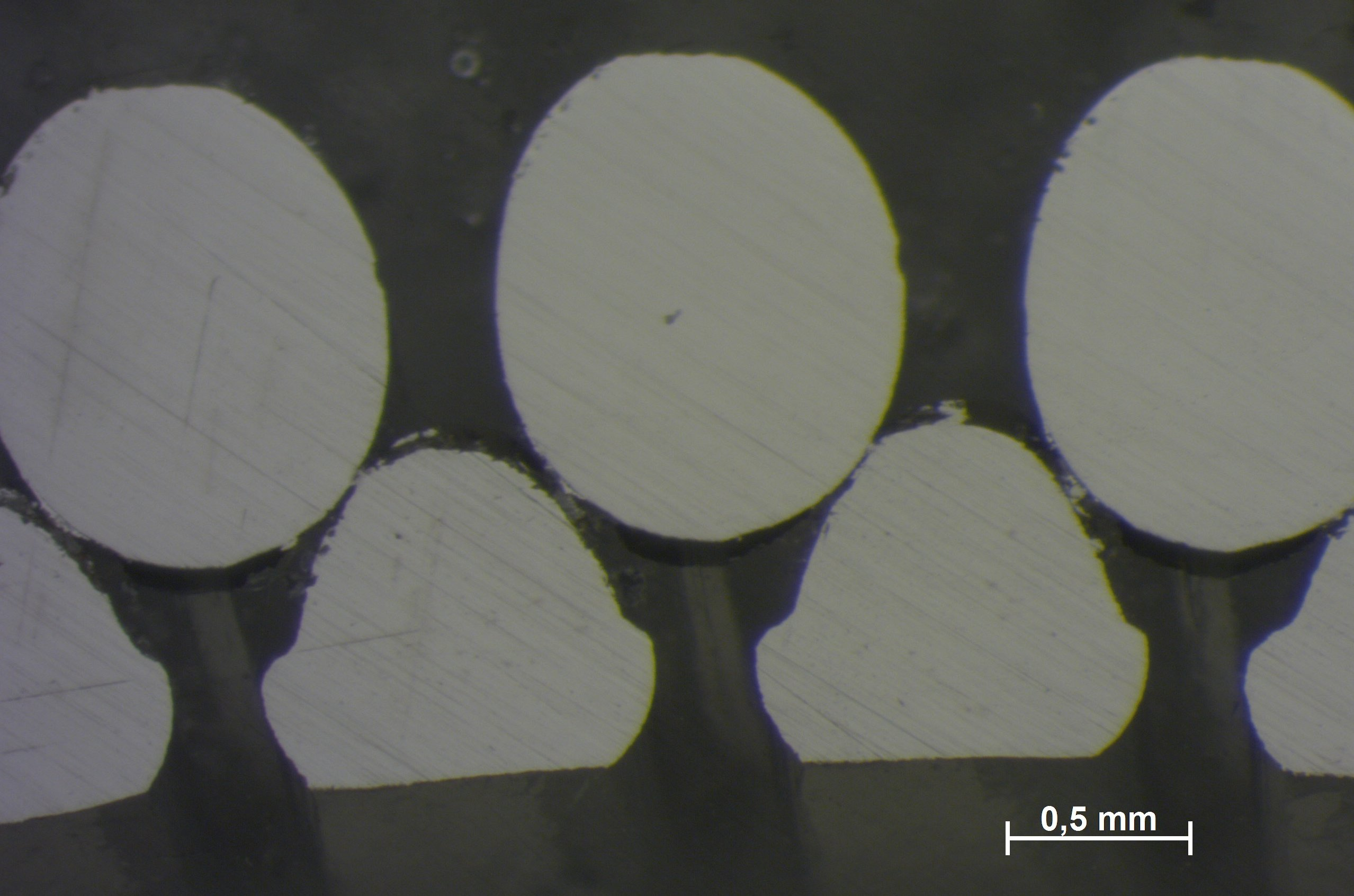
Outer wire pushed out of the gaps

Construction of a gooseneck made of a round wire helix with triangular wire wound over it.

== Applications ==
Goosenecks are used as fixtures when quick, freely positionable alignment is required.

As components of lamps, their high flexibility is used to adjust the lighting to individual needs. Power for the lamp is supplied through the inside of the gooseneck. The same applies to illuminated magnifiers, where the magnifying glass is held in addition to the lamp.

Goosenecks are also used in fiber-optics. In microscope illumination, glass fibres are bundled inside the gooseneck to guide the light from a cold light source directly to the area to be examined. Additional stands or mounts are not required due to the rigid shape of the gooseneck.

In automobiles, gooseneck constructions are used to hold navigation systems or mobile phones. In the 1970s, car audio equipment manufacturer Blaupunkt produced a series of car radios with a control unit on a gooseneck; in the models Berlin, Sylt and BEQ-S (Equalizer).

In some cases, the flexible arms are also useful when carrying out work in inaccessible places. Magnets or grippers at the end of the gooseneck can be used to "fish out" small parts from inaccessible places, a mirror or lighting allows views into hidden corners. A gooseneck on a stick lighter allows convenient lighting in hard-to-reach positions.

When used as a coolant hose on machine tools, a hose is drawn through the inside of the gooseneck. A jet of liquid can then be metered with pinpoint accuracy. Today, however, liquid or air for cooling and rinsing is usually passed through a chain of plastic fittings (articulated hose) that are fitted together like a ball joint and which, with suitable holding force, maintain their bend in a clamping manner.

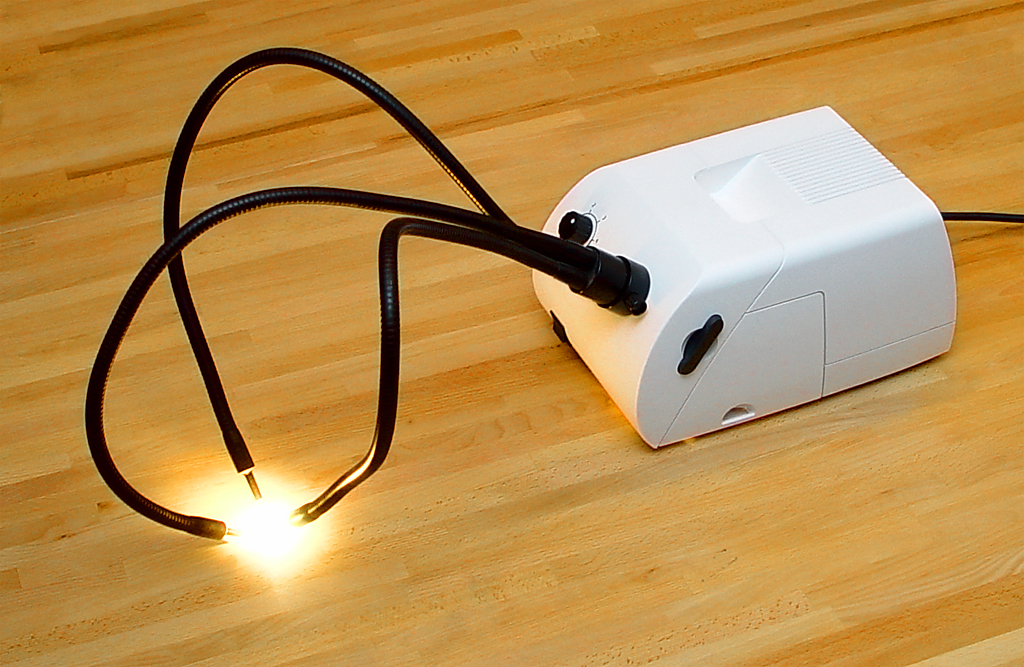
Cold light source with three-armed gooseneck light guide.

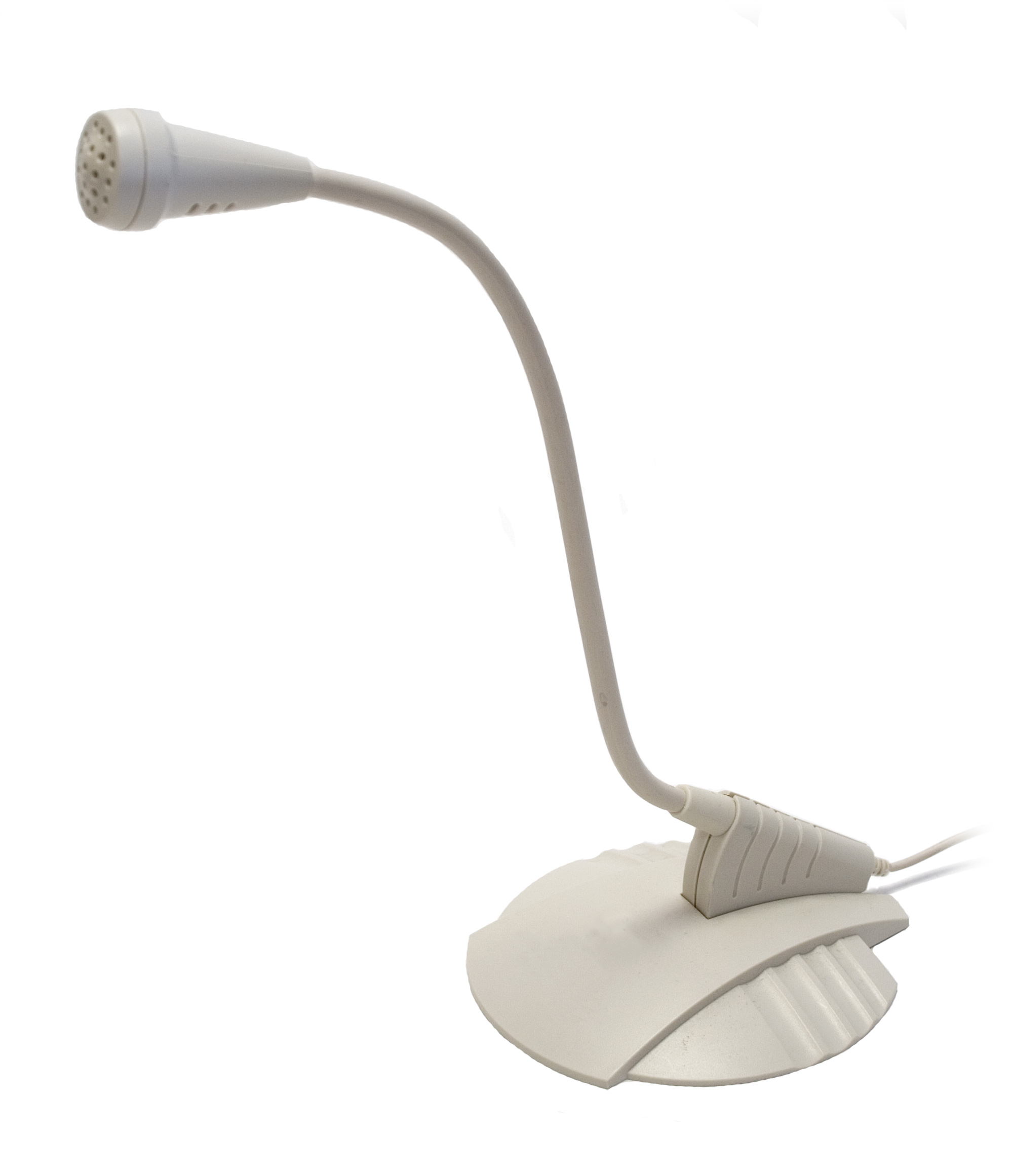
Tabletop microphone with gooseneck holder.

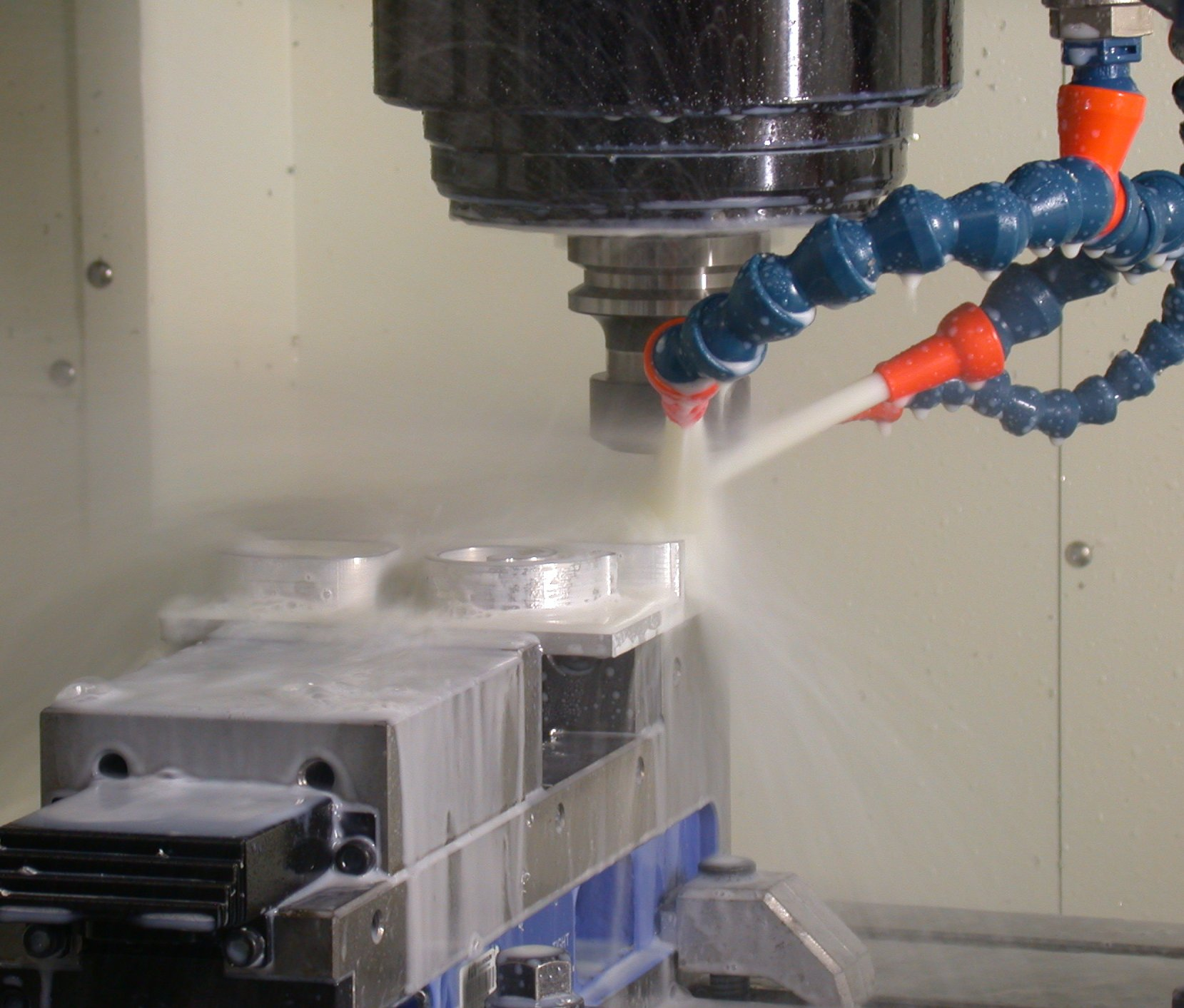
Machine tool with articulated hose for the cooling lubricant

=== Flex arms ===
Flex arms are a type of goosenecks that usually use an assembly of ball-and-socket joints to make a holder of arbitrary lengths.

== Cultural references ==
In The Brave Little Toaster, Lampy is based on this design of lamp, thus making him ideal as a desk lamp for a college dorm.
