= CinéMagique =

Defunct theatre show at Disneyland Paris

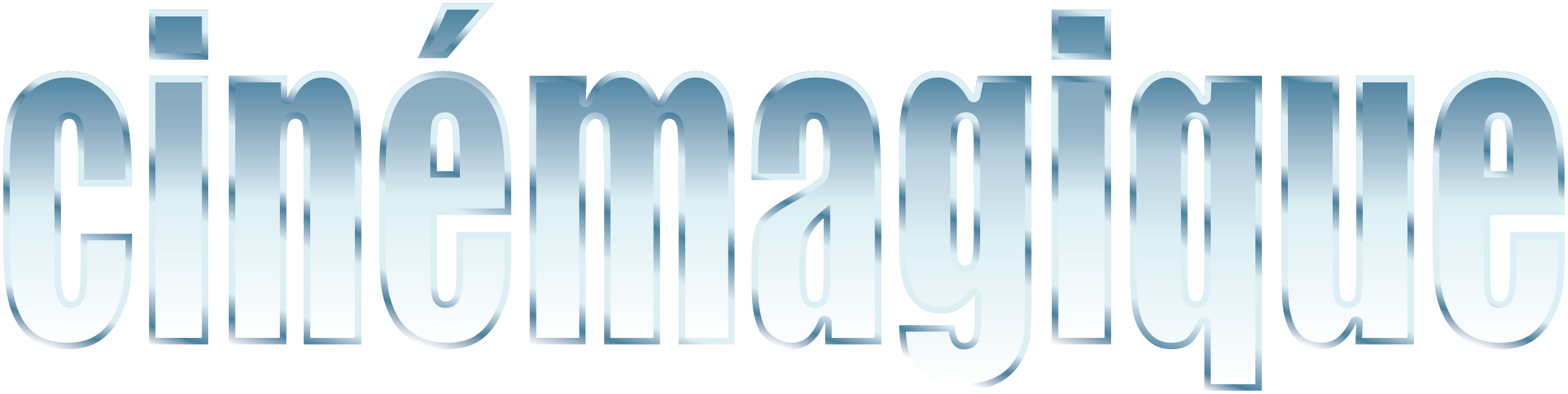

Disney Adventure World
- Area: Production Courtyard
- Coordinates: 48°52′2.28″N 2°46′48.86″E
- Status: Removed
- Opening date: March 16, 2002
- Closing date: March 29, 2017
- Replaced by: Together: a Pixar Musical Adventure

Ride statistics
- Attraction type: Cinema
- Designer: Walt Disney Imagineering
- Theme: Cinema history
- Audience capacity: 1,100 per show
- Duration: 26 minutes
- Director: Jerry Rees
- Writer: Steve Spiegel
- Composer: Bruce Broughton
- Wheelchair accessible

CinéMagique is a former theatre show at Disney Adventure World in Disneyland Paris mixing the live performance of an actor with synchronized movie scenes on a big screen. The attraction has opened with the park on March 16, 2002, starring Martin Short and Julie Delpy. The last show was on March 29, 2017 and was replaced by the Marvel Super Heroes United stunt show. The show temporarily returned from December 1, 2018, to February 3, 2019. This "revisited" version of the show featured additional special effects.

== Plot ==
The show begins with a castmember reciting an opening spiel regarding the nature of the show : “Today, you are going to see a movie on the history of cinema spanning from silent films to today's modern films.” The movie starts playing a montage of early black-and-white films. After a few moments, a cell phone ring is heard, and a man in the front rows answers it. He eludes the castmember and walks on the stage while talking.

Meanwhile, the love scene on screen between a Prince and a Princess is interrupted by this man's noisy conversation. The angered Prince attempts to stop him, but is unable to reach him due to the movie screen. He then enlists the help of a nearby Magician to silence him. This Magician executes a magic trick which makes the man disappear from the stage in a plume of smoke, and reappear inside the movie (here portrayed by Martin Short). Short's character (known as "George") seems unable to recover from his surprise, and the Prince corrects him by punching him in the face. As the Prince and the Magician leave, the Princess (called "Marguerite"), portrayed by Julie Delpy, comforts poor George. Yet, the Prince, seeing this, starts chasing after him with a sword.

George escapes via a window to suddenly find out he is on the ledge of a high building with Harold Lloyd, in the scene of the clock tower from the Safety Last!. George finds a fire escape and eventually makes it to the ground. Just as he thinks that he is safe, a pie is thrown at his face. He can't see that many others in the street, including Charlie Chaplin and Laurel & Hardy, are engaged in throwing pies at one another. George falls into the action, and discovers he can talk, meaning he has left silent movies.

Then, after angering an armed man by throwing a pie at him, George is backed down against a wall by a group of gangsters, in the scene from Angels with Dirty Faces. Before he ends up being shot, two men appear behind the gangsters, distracting them and allowing him to escape. However, George's escape is too noisy, and alerts the gangsters, who start shooting at him. Clips here included scenes from Some Like It Hot. George then crashes through a window. At this point, he has left the realm of black-and-white films.

As George stands up, he realizes he is part of scenes from the movies Once Upon a Time in the West and The Good, the Bad and the Ugly, with bandits standing before him. As George's phone rings, the scene uses Sergio Leone's method of extreme close-ups to build up a shootout. George reaches for the phone and the shootout started using footage from multiple westerns, including The Magnificent Seven. In his attempt to escape the gunfire, George drops his phone, and then seeks refuge in a nearby shed filled with TNT and other explosives. A cowboy then shoots a crate of TNT, and sends George flying into the air.

George comes blasting out of a chimney on the rooftops of London, thrust into the universe of Mary Poppins. He is then immediately sucked into the song "Step In Time". Meanwhile, Maguerite has been following George, whom she falls in love with, and arrives in the scene of the shootout. She can only find George's phone on the ground. The film cuts back to George walking down a street during pouring rain (from The Umbrellas of Cherbourg). There, he meets Marguerite, who hands his phone back. Then, they call a taxi, but George ends u sucked down a puddle he has jumped into. Marguerite attempts to follow him, but is unable to.

George has now dived underwater, coming across the Red October submarine from The Hunt for Red October (Marko Ramius is startled to see George through the periscope). George also meets the divers from The Big Blue. Then, as he swims away, he encounters Pinocchio, who attempts to warn him about a large vicious savage whale named Monstro, who accidentally awakens and suddenly chases both George and Pinocchio, who quickly manage to escape his jaws.

Upon reaching the surface, George sees the Titanic approaching him. He gets helped out onto the bow by a lookout, only to see the ship hitting the iceberg. As passengers start running to the escape boats, George hears Jack Dawson calling for his life, and reaches the corridor of doors to find him. He opens random doors, each one revealing someone else behind. The scenes include John Cleese from A Fish Called Wanda, Inspector Clouseau from The Pink Panther, Hannibal Lecter from The Silence of the Lambs, Sulley from Monsters, Inc., who angrily roars at him, and mistakenly frightens him, and Linda Blair from The Exorcist. Then, as the water is flooding the corridor, and right before George meets his demise, the wall he stands against opens up and grabs and catches him over inside a Death Star.

George is now aboard the Death Star. He is quickly grabbed by a stormtrooper, who takes him to a hidden corner, just in time to elude Darth Vader walking down the corridor, hoping to find out the presence in the force. This helpful stormtrooper is then revealed to be Marguerite. Yet, real stormtroopers start chasing them through the space station, and to escape, they re-enact the scene where Princess Leia and Luke Skywalker use the wire to traverse the chasm.

As they land on the other side, they are in a medieval setting. A nearby Knight notices George and Marguerite, and walks over to them. George begs for his help to get back to the other side of the screen in the real world. However, havoc breaks loose. Armies descend and a battle ensues between knights. Kevin Costner as Robin Hood shoots an arrow toward Marguerite, who is saved by George jumping on its way to stop it. The arrow has clearly punctured his heart, and the fighting stops. As the Knight removes it, he finds out that it has actually stabbed George's cell phone. Scared by its ringtone, the Knight crushes it. Then, he walks to the top of the hill and lightning strikes his sword. He throws it toward the screen, breaking it open and creating a portal allowing George to travel back to the Theater. He does so, but the portal closes before Marguerite crosses it. Finally, the Magician returns and creates a door for George to walk through. George then decides to go back into screen, and the movie ends with a loving embrace between them, complemented by a montage of famous on-screen kisses. The show closes with George and Marguerite skipping toward the Emerald City from The Wizard of Oz.

Halfway through 2013, some scenes (when George opened doors in the Titanic, and during the 'kissing' scene at the end) are replaced by scenes from newer movies such as: Ratatouille, Toy Story 3, The Incredibles and The Chronicles of Narnia.

== List of featured films ==
As mentioned in the Plot summary above, the attraction showcased scenes from a wide variety of films. Below is a complete listing of the films shown, in order of appearance:

Workers Leaving the Lumière Factory, The Kiss, L'Arrivée d'un train en gare de La Ciotat, The Great Train Robbery, A Trip to the Moon, The Birth of a Nation, Cops, Plane Crazy, Napoléon, The Battleship Potemkin, Nosferatu, The Cabinet of Dr. Caligari, Metropolis, The Sheik, Safety Last!, The Battle of the Century, Behind The Screen, Angels with Dirty Faces, Some Like It Hot, Once Upon a Time in the West, The Good, the Bad and the Ugly, Tombstone, The Wild Bunch, The Magnificent Seven, Mary Poppins, The Umbrellas of Cherbourg, The Hunt for Red October, The Big Blue, Pinocchio, Titanic, A Fish Called Wanda, Trois Hommes et un Couffin, The Pink Panther, The Silence of the Lambs, Monsters, Inc., The Exorcist, Star Wars Episode IV: A New Hope, The Three Musketeers, Highlander, Ran, El Cid, Henri V, Monty Python and the Holy Grail, Robin Hood: Prince of Thieves, Summertime, Doctor Zhivago, Casablanca, Gone with the Wind, A Man and a Woman, Wuthering Heights, Ridicule, The Horseman on the Roof, The Rules of the Game, The Black Orchid, A Place in the Sun, Carmen Jones, Cyrano de Bergerac, Who Framed Roger Rabbit, Brave Little Tailor, To Catch a Thief, The Messenger: The Story of Joan of Arc, The Wizard of Oz

== Cast ==
- Martin Short: George
- Julie Delpy: Marguerite
- Alan Cumming: The Magician
- Tchéky Karyo: The Knight
