= The Brave Little Toaster to the Rescue =

1997 film

- DVD cover
- Directed by: Robert C. Ramirez
- Screenplay by: Willard Carroll
- Based on: Characters by Thomas M. Disch
- Produced by: John Bush; Donald Kushner; Tom Wilhite
- Starring: Chris Young; Jessica Tuck; Deanna Oliver; Roger Kabler; Eric Lloyd; Timothy Stack; Thurl Ravenscroft; Andy Milder; Alfre Woodard; Danny Nucci; Andy Daly; Eddie Bracken; Jay Mohr; Brian Doyle-Murray
- Edited by: Julie Lau
- Music by: Alexander Janko; William Finn
- Production companies: Hyperion Pictures; The Kushner-Locke Company
- Distributed by: Buena Vista Home Entertainment (Note: Under Walt Disney Home Video imprint)
- Release date: 1997
- Running time: 74 minutes
- Country: United States
- Language: English

The Brave Little Toaster to the Rescue is a 1997 American animated musical film. Unlike other installments in the Brave Little Toaster lineup, it is the only film not to be based on the novella of the same name by Thomas M. Disch. It is the sequel to The Brave Little Toaster (1987). The film was released direct-to-video.

A sequel, The Brave Little Toaster Goes to Mars, was released in 1998.

== Plot ==
Rob McGroarty, the owner of the appliances, and the one referred to as "The Master", is in his last days of college while simultaneously working at a veterinary clinic. One night, while finishing his thesis, his computer crashes due to a computer virus. The appliances, along with an irascible rat named Ratso, a sweet cat named Maisie, her three newborn kittens, a broken-legged Chihuahua named Alberto, a companionable snake named Murgatroid, and an elderly monkey named Sebastian, seek to help Rob by finding and reversing the effects of his computer virus. Meanwhile, Mack, Rob's lab assistant, plots to sell the injured animals Rob had been tending to a Santa Clarita laboratory named "Tartarus Laboratories". Rob and his girlfriend Chris also have a falling out due to Chris misusing Kirby and Rob forgetting about their anniversary. The appliances discover an abandoned, old prototype TLW-728 supercomputer named Wittgenstein in the basement. Wittgenstein reveals that he is living on one rare vacuum tube, a WFC-11-12-55, due to being infected by a computer virus. Wittgenstein was also aware of Mack's plot and attempted to alert Rob, but got the thesis lost in the process. The appliances learn that unless they find a replacement quickly, Wittgenstein's vacuum tube will blow and lead to his death.

In an attempt to return Wittgenstein to his full capacity, Radio and Ratso go to the storage building of the college to find the WFC-11-12-55 tube. However, when Radio and Ratso return with the tube, they accidentally break it during an argument. Wittgenstein does his best to survive, but the virus causes him to blow his remaining tube and he dies. Guilt-ridden over condemning the animals to their doom, Radio gives up his own tube, sacrificing himself. The appliances install Radio's tube in Wittgenstein and he wakes up with boosted power that regenerates all of his other tubes and destroys all the viruses within him. The appliances and Wittgenstein alert Rob and Chris of Mack's scheme. The appliances create a makeshift vehicle out of a modem, an office cart, and a car battery and pursue Mack's truck with Rob, Chris, and some guard dogs sent by Wittgenstein following them. They manage to lure the police to the front of the truck (causing the appliances to crash into the back) and have Mack arrested, with Rob also outraged that Mack was plotting this behind his back all along.

After discovering the appliances in the truck, Rob and Chris assume that Mack had also planned to sell Rob's stuff, but Rob wonders where Radio is. Later, they discover Wittgenstein and Radio in the basement, but Rob is dismayed that Radio's tube is missing and Wittgenstein restores Rob's thesis. Rob proposes to Chris and she replaces Radio's tube with a new one she found in Nome, reviving him. In the aftermath, Rob and Chris decide to keep Ratso as their pet before they leave college with their appliances and Ratso, planning to start a new and happy life together. Meanwhile, Maisie and her kittens are the official mascots for the Sigma Chi fraternity, Alberto is adopted by the college's dean, Sebastian goes to live in a primate house at a zoo in Texas, Murgatroid has permanent residence in the reptile house at the zoo, and Wittgenstein is sent to a science museum as his new home where he will never be forgotten, while also being modernized with current technology to phase out his old vacuum tubes to keep him in efficient, working condition.

== Voice cast ==
- Chris Young as Master Rob McGroarty, a university student, and the original human owner of the five appliances.
- Jessica Tuck as Chris, Rob's tomboyish girlfriend.
- Deanna Oliver as Toaster, an inspiring pop-up two-slice toaster who is the leader of the clan of small appliances. Toaster is lion-hearted, rational, kind, contemplative, and caring.
- Roger Kabler as Radio, a smart-alecky dial A.M. radio alarm clock whose personality parodies noisy and flamboyant announcers. Kabler replaces Jon Lovitz from the original film.
- Eric Lloyd as Blanky, an electric blanket with a naive demeanor. Lloyd replaces Timothy E. Day from the original film.
- Timothy Stack as Lampy, an easily impressed yet slightly cranky desktop gooseneck lamp. He is bright but tends to be ironically clueless, though he has a couple of good points.
- Thurl Ravenscroft as Kirby, a very deep-voiced, individualistic upright vacuum cleaner who dons a negative, grouchy attitude towards the other appliances.
- Andy Milder as Ratso, a rat who is irascible about being kept as a pet by Rob in the first place. He is discourteous to almost everybody, but as the film progresses, Ratso begins to fix his attitude.
- Alfre Woodard as Maisie, a sweet cat who is watchful of her three kittens. Though she initially did not like Ratso because of his discourteous behavior, by the end of the film, he makes amends with her.
- Danny Nucci as Alberto, a Chihuahua with a broken leg who speaks with a Mexican accent.
- Andy Daly as Murgatroid, a companionable snake who speaks with a heavy sibilance.
- Eddie Bracken as Sebastian the Monkey, an elderly monkey who was the victim of the inhuman experiments of Tartarus Laboratories and as a result has a mutilated and bandaged hand.
- Jay Mohr as Mack McCro, the former assistant of Rob McGroarty. Unlike the latter, he doesn't care about animals' feelings. He only cares about making money and wants to sell the animals (which Rob has taken care of) to Tartarus Laboratories.
- Brian Doyle-Murray as Wittgenstein, a prototype vacuum-tube-based supercomputer. He is powered by a very rare cathode radio tube called the WFC-11-12-55. He was outmoded when transistors were invented. By the start of the film, he is infected with a computer virus, causing him to function improperly.
- Eddie Deezen as Charlie
- Jonathan Benair as Jim Bob, the assistant of Mack McCro. He and Mack plan to take the animals to Tartarus Laboratory.
- Paddi Edwards as Lab Computer
- Marc Allen Lewis as Security Guard
- Ross Mapletoft as Modem
- Kevin Meaney as Computer, a home computer who lives in Rob's house.
- Victoria Jackson as Mouse, a mouse.
- Laurel Green as Campus Student
- Neil Ross as Security Camera and Police Man
- B.J. Ward as Police Lady
- Frank Welker as the Dobermans
- Nancy Cartwright as Virus
- Aretha Franklin as Homebuilt Computer

== Music ==
Alexander Janko composed the film's score. In addition to the original songs, "I'm into Something Good" by Herman's Hermits is played at the film's opening.

All lyrics are written by Ellen Fitzhugh; all music is composed by William Finn.

No.	Title	Performer(s)	Length
1.	"Remember That Day"	Alfre Woodard, Eddie Bracken, Andrew Daly, Danny Nucci & Chorus
2.	"Super Highway"	Aretha Franklin & Chorus
3.	"Chomp and Munch"	Brian Doyle-Murray & Chorus
4.	"Hang In There, Kid"	Cast & Chorus
