= The Brave Little Toaster =

1987 animated film by Jerry Rees

- United Kingdom theatrical release poster
- Directed by: Jerry Rees
- Screenplay by: Jerry Rees; Joe Ranft
- Story by: Jerry Rees; Joe Ranft; Brian McEntee
- Based on: The Brave Little Toaster by Thomas M. Disch
- Produced by: Donald Kushner; Thomas L. Wilhite
- Starring: Deanna Oliver; Timothy E. Day; Jon Lovitz; Tim Stack; Thurl Ravenscroft
- Edited by: Donald W. Ernst
- Music by: David Newman
- Production companies: Hyperion Pictures; The Kushner-Locke Company
- Distributed by: Hyperion Pictures (Note: The film did not have a standard theatrical release after Skouras Pictures pulled out of the distribution deal following Disney Channel purchasing broadcast rights. Hyperion self-distributed the film themselves the following year for limited release.)
- Release date: July 10, 1987 (Los Angeles)
- Running time: 90 minutes
- Country: United States
- Language: English
- Budget: $2.3 million
- Box office: $2.3 million (estimated)

The Brave Little Toaster is a 1987 American independent animated musical adventure film directed by Jerry Rees. It is based on the 1980 novella of the same name by Thomas M. Disch. The film stars Deanna Oliver, Timothy E. Day, Jon Lovitz, Tim Stack, and Thurl Ravenscroft. It is set in a world where domestic appliances and other consumer electronics come to life, pretending to be lifeless in the presence of humans. The story focuses on five anthropomorphic household appliances—a toaster, gooseneck lamp, electric blanket, tube radio and upright vacuum cleaner—who go on a quest to search for their owner.

The film was produced by Hyperion Pictures and The Kushner-Locke Company. Many CalArts graduates, including the original members of Pixar, were involved in its production. The rights to the book were acquired by Walt Disney Studios in 1982. John Lasseter, then employed at Disney, wanted to make a computer-animated film based on it, but it was turned down. While the film received a limited theatrical release, The Brave Little Toaster received positive reviews and was popular on home video. It was followed by two sequels, The Brave Little Toaster to the Rescue in 1997 and The Brave Little Toaster Goes to Mars in 1998.

== Plot ==
In a small wooden cabin, five midcentury electric appliances – Toaster, Radio, a desk lamp named "Lampy", an electric blanket named "Blanky" and a vacuum cleaner named "Kirby" – await the return of a young boy named Rob (whom they refer to as "the Master") who used to vacation at the cabin with his family, but has not come by in some years. One day, upon seeing that the cabin is about to be sold, the appliances decide to venture out and find Rob themselves. They turn Kirby into a makeshift vehicle by attaching a rolling office chair, a power strip, and a car battery to him, and set out towards the city.

Along their journey, the appliances have numerous harrowing adventures. When their battery runs low, the group stops for the night in a forest, with Blanky serving as a tent. But that night, a fierce storm blows Blanky up into the trees, and Lampy uses himself as a lightning rod to recharge the battery. After recovering Blanky the next morning, the appliances try to cross a waterfall, but everyone except Kirby falls into the murky water below. Kirby dives in and rescues the others; but with the chair, power strip, and battery lost, the group resorts to pulling the disabled Kirby through a swamp. They are almost swallowed up by a giant bog of quicksand, but are saved by Elmo St. Peters, who takes them to his appliance parts store. There, St. Peters prepares to extract and sell Radio's vacuum tubes, but the other appliances frighten St. Peters by pretending to be a ghost, causing him to knock himself unconscious. The appliances subsequently escape from the store.

Meanwhile, Rob, now a young adult, goes out to the cottage with his girlfriend Chris to retrieve the appliances to take with him to college. The group arrives at Rob's apartment, but his family's newer appliances, resentful that Rob favors the older appliances, demonstrate how much more technologically advanced they are and throw the group out of the apartment and into a dumpster, hoping that this will get Rob to take them instead; this ploy ultimately fails to convince Rob. Rob and Chris return home empty-handed, but an old television set in the apartment, a friend of the five appliances who formerly resided in the cottage with them, plays fictional advertisements for the junkyard the appliances have been taken to, convincing Rob and Chris to go there and find them.

At the junkyard, the appliances despair, believing Rob no longer wants them. They are picked up by a large scowling electromagnet, and are about to be destroyed by a crusher, but after seeing Rob arrive at the junkyard, they regain hope and attempt to rejoin him. The magnet thwarts their escape and forces them onto the conveyor belt leading to the crusher. Rob spots all the appliances except Toaster on the conveyor belt and attempts to rescue them, but the magnet picks them all up and drops them back on the belt. Toaster jumps into the crusher's gears, stopping it just before it flattens Rob and the others, but is badly mangled in the process. Back at the apartment, Rob repairs Toaster while dismissing Chris's suggestion to buy a new toaster instead. Rob and Chris depart for college with all five appliances in tow.

== Voice cast ==
- Deanna Oliver as Toaster, a pop-up two-slice toaster who is the leader of the group of minor electrical appliances. Toaster is courageous, intelligent, kind, thoughtful and warmhearted, and is the one who devises the idea of going on a journey to locate the appliances' master Rob.
- Timothy E. Day as Blanket "Blanky", an electric blanket with an innocent demeanor. Child-like and insecure, Blanky is the youngest appliance who is deeply distressed over Rob's absence and wants nothing more than to be reunited with him. Toaster and Blanky share a warm, brother relationship.
  - Day also voices Young Rob in several flashbacks.
- Thurl Ravenscroft as Kirby, a bass-voiced, individualistic upright vacuum cleaner who dons a cynical, cantankerous attitude towards the other appliances, though deep inside he cares about them greatly. He is the biggest, strongest and oldest member who acts as the second-in-command of the group.
- Jon Lovitz as Radio, a wisecracking vacuum-tube-based dial A.M. radio alarm clock with a personality that parodies loud and pretentious announcers.
  - Jerry Rees as Radio's singing voice.
- Timothy Stack as Lampy, an easily impressed yet slightly irascible tensor gooseneck desktop lamp. While he can be ironically dim-witted at times despite being "bright" due to his light, he is shown to be clever and resourceful when things get dire.
  - Stack also voices a customer at the spare parts shop named "Zeke".
- Wayne Kaatz as "Master" Rob McGroarty, the original human owner of the five appliances. After appearing as a child in flashbacks, Rob as a young adult is leaving for college. While in the book, Rob plans to sell the cabin along with the appliances, in the film, Rob still has sentimentality towards appliances and takes them to college in the end.
- Colette Savage as Chris, Rob's tomboyish, sarcastic, supportive girlfriend.
- Phil Hartman as Air Conditioner, a Jack Nicholson-inspired, sardonic, and bitter air conditioner who resides in the cabin with the rest of the group.
  - Hartman also voices the Hanging Lamp, a Peter Lorre-inspired pendant light in the spare parts shop.
- Joe Ranft as Elmo St. Peters, the owner of a spare appliance parts shop where he disassembles appliances and sells the parts.
  - Ranft also voices the evil clown in Toaster's nightmare.
- Beth Anderson as the Mae West-inspired reel-to-reel tape recorder in "It's a B-Movie" and the wooded wagon in "Worthless".
- Janice Liebhart as the fan in "It's a B-Movie", the phone in "Cutting Edge" and the pink convertible in "Worthless".
- Judy Toll as Mishmash, a Joan Rivers-inspired hybrid device consisting of a can opener, a gooseneck desktop lamp and an electric shaver.
- Darryl Phinnessee as various characters in "It's a B-Movie" and "Cutting Edge" and the hearse in "Worthless".
- Jonathan Benair as TV, a black and white television set who has moved to Rob's apartment and is an old member of the group.
- Jim Jackman as Plugsy, a pear-shaped night table lamp stand who is the leader of the modern appliances that reside in Rob's apartment. While they are benevolent in the novel, in the film, they are initially jealous and antagonistic towards the group.
- Mindy Stern as Rob's mother, an unseen character.
  - Toll and Stern also voice the Two-Faced Sewing Machine, one of the modern appliances that reside in Rob's apartment.
- Randy Bennett as Computer, one of the modern appliances that reside in Rob's apartment.
- Randall William Cook as Entertainment Complex, a stereophonic entertainment complex system, one of the modern appliances that reside in Rob's apartment.
- Susie Allanson as the toaster oven in Rob's apartment.

== Production ==
=== Conception and financing ===
The film rights to The Brave Little Toaster, the original novella by Thomas M. Disch, were purchased by the Walt Disney Studios in 1982, two years after its appearance in The Magazine of Fantasy & Science Fiction. After animators John Lasseter and Glen Keane had finished a short 2D/3D test film based on the book Where the Wild Things Are (1963), Lasseter and producer Thomas L. Wilhite decided they wanted to produce a whole feature with the same technique.

The story they chose was The Brave Little Toaster, and this became the first CGI film Lasseter ever pitched, but in their enthusiasm, they ran into issues pitching the idea to two high-level Disney executives, animation administrator Ed Hansen, and Disney president Ron W. Miller. Ron Miller asked about the cost after the pitch and when Lasseter replied that it would cost no more than a traditionally animated film, Miller rejected the pitch, saying that the only reason to use computers would be if it was "faster or cheaper".

A few minutes after the meeting, Lasseter received a phone call from Hansen and was instructed to come down to his office, where Lasseter was informed that he was dismissed. Originally set to commence at the Disney studios with a budget of $18 million, development was then transferred to the new Hyperion Pictures, which had been created by former Disney employees Tom Wilhite and Willard Carroll, who took the production along with them after Wilhite successfully requested the project from then-president Ron Miller. As a result, the film was financed as an independent production by Disney, with the aid of electronics company TDK Corporation and video distributor CBS/Fox Video.

The budget was reduced by $12.06 million to $5.94 million as production began, approximately a third of the budget offered when in-house. Despite providing funds to get it off the ground, Disney was not involved with production of the film. Rees later commented that there were external forces at work that had the right to say this was a cheap film that could be shipped overseas, which the staff objected to and therefore were willing to make sacrifices to improve the quality of the film despite its limited budget.

=== Writing ===
In 1986, Hyperion began to work on the story and character development. Jerry Rees, a crew member on two previous Disney films, The Fox and the Hound (1981) and Tron (1982), and co-writer of the screenplay along with Joe Ranft, was chosen to direct the project. He had been working on an animated adaptation of Will Eisner's The Spirit with Brad Bird, and received a call from Wilhite asking him to develop, write, and direct, explaining that The Brave Little Toaster was being adapted into a short, but that a feature film was possible if handled correctly. Joe Ranft and Rees worked on developing the story. The storyboards were designed by Rees, Ranft, along with Alex Mann and Darrell Rooney. When animators ran out of pages to storyboard, Rees sat down and wrote more of the script.

The work was significantly adapted from the original story. Only about four lines of dialogue from the book ended up in the finished film. Rees decided to move the junkyard sequence from the middle of the story to its end because of the junkyard's symbolism as a graveyard for appliances. He also wanted a definitive moment that earned Toaster the title of "brave", so he had Toaster jump into the gears to save the Master, a plot point that wasn't in the book. Having the character's voices in his head when writing the script helped Rees to personalize the dialogue. He even reworked some of the already-completed script in order to customize sections based on the actors' personalities. After cutting together the storyboards and scene-planning in Taipei, production manager Chuck Richardson explained the logistics issues—the film would be 110 minutes long. As a result, Rees decided to cut around 20 minutes' worth of the story — the deleted scenes have not been released to the public.

=== Casting ===
Rees was still in the process of writing when he decided to find actors. Many auditioners presented cartoony, exaggerated voices, which displeased him, because they did not believe their characters or bring a reality to the role. As a result, he sought out voice talent from The Groundlings improvisational group upon recommendation by Ranft, and he appreciated the honesty and naturalism they gave to their performances. Many of their members, including Jon Lovitz (Radio), Phil Hartman (Air Conditioner/Hanging Lamp), Timothy Stack (Lampy), Judy Toll (Mishmash), and Mindy Sterling (Rob's mother) voiced characters in the film. Already established as an actor through Tony the Tiger and How the Grinch Stole Christmas! (1966) Thurl Ravenscroft was cast as Kirby the vacuum cleaner. Heading the ensemble cast were Groundlings performer Deanna Oliver as Toaster, and newcomer Timothy E. Day as Blanky.

Oliver originally auditioned for Air Conditioner using a Bette Davis impression, but accepted the lead when offered. Rees, who had conceived Toaster as a male character, later recalled an anecdote where a crew member "slammed the door and walked out" because he had hired a woman to play the lead role. Day had never done acting work before, and had asked his mother to take him to auditions after becoming fascinated with a child actor voice-over.

=== Recording ===
Recording sessions took place at a small derelict property in Hollywood. Rees's direction primarily consisted of ensuring the performances were as natural and realistic as possible. When recording, Rees first had each scene delivered as written, and then allowed the voice actors to play around with the dialogue and ended up using many of the improvised lines in the final film. Unusual for the time, some of the recordings were done in group sessions.

After being cast, Jon Lovitz got an opportunity to appear on Saturday Night Live. Because Rees had written the part of Radio specifically for Lovitz, he tried to find a way to keep Lovitz in the film. They ended up doing a marathon recording session, recording all of Lovitz's lines of dialogue in one night. Rees then stood in for Lovitz when the others were recording.

Rees described Timothy Day as an "amazing performer", who would ask about his character's motivation and the context of each scenario before recording his lines. Day was nicknamed "one-take Timmy" due to nailing the emotional truth of the text so quickly, such as crying loudly or delivering a line with a quiver in his voice. Comparing this film to the sequels, where a high note was dubbed by another singer due to being off-key, Oliver noted that in this film it would have been kept in due to being part of the character.

=== Animation ===
The crew initially worked on pre-production for six months in Los Angeles in 1985, and then a staff of ten people moved to Taiwan with Rees for another six months to work with Wang Film Productions Company Limited in Taipei (headed by James Wang) for the principal animation, then returned for a third six-month work period for post-production in the U.S. Rees's wife Rebecca was the film's directing animator, and she taught classes to the Taiwanese animators in order to improve the quality of their output.

The animators also had a mixture of ex-Disney employees and college graduates from CalArts. Every day, they had to do what would normally be done across a two-week period at Disney. The colour stylist was veteran Disney animator A. Kendall O'Connor, a member of Disney's feature animation department from its first feature Snow White and the Seven Dwarfs (1937), and Oliver likened the light-hearted frog sequence to Merrie Melodies. A massive TDK sign was included by Rees as the company was a big sponsor. The animators used many visual cues to help inform the audience about plot and character. For example, during the nightmare sequence at the beginning of the film, Toaster burns toast and emits smoke, which symbolizes guilt and fear of being responsible.

They deduced toasters would be afraid of things like forks and falling into the bathtub while plugged in, so they included them in this sequence. Oliver described the transition from bathtub sparks to lightning outside the house as proper filmmaking. Similarly, Blanky being a certain shade of yellow bears significance to the plot. In the beginning of their journey, the other characters dismiss him, even Toaster. Then Toaster encounters a flower that is the same color, who also wants to snuggle. After explaining it is just a reflection, he walks away, thereby making the flower wilt. The next moment shows Toaster proactively rescuing Blanky. The idea is that the flower informs Toaster that his actions will make Blanky wilt too.

=== Music and sound ===
The film score of The Brave Little Toaster was composed and conducted by David Newman and performed by the New Japan Philharmonic. Newman's score for this movie was one of his earlier works and apparently one that he felt very close to. He did not view it as a cheerful one and decided to give the film a dramatic score to reinforce the serious nature of many of the film's themes. Rees admired his "rich, classical style", and chose him so that the film wouldn't have "cartoon music". Rees stated that Newman would attempt to get into the headspace of the characters and thought in the terms of the inanimate objects being real characters.

Rees said that Newman's score was as "grand as anything he would ever do", rather than composing the music differently due to the medium being animation. He wove death, joy, love, loss, and struggle into the work. Newman's composing style was influenced by his philosophy that behind every "chord of joy" lies an element of sadness, whether it being the knowledge it won't last forever, that it is a facade for a deeper emotion, or that joy itself comes from sadness. He used lush strings in the opening scenes to convey a sense of longing. As the characters are introduced, the score becomes more lively, and each character has their own theme, influenced by their personality. For example, Kirby is a grumpy and old vacuum cleaner, and so Newman provides a theme consisting of low chords, whereas Radio was given a brassy fanfare to reflect his self-important personality. These musical motifs wove their way into the entire movie score.

At some points, the style of music was used to provoke an emotional response, for example when the Air Conditioner breaks down, the orchestra first trembles and then bursts with energy. After this the music returns to a somber tone, as the appliances start to realize that there is truth to what he said. When they explore the outside world for the first time, the music fills with a "pastoral grandeur", and when they enter the woods, strings, flutes, bells and brass are used to convey the simultaneous magic and danger of the outdoors. The film also contains a Busby Berkeley Italian opera-esque sequence containing a fish. The score was finally given a limited release in 2004. The film contains four original songs ("City of Light", "It's a B-Movie", "Cutting Edge", and "Worthless") that were written by Van Dyke Parks. Rees "felt uncomfortable with the full Broadway book musical approach", and his philosophy was that the songs should be part of the action and plot without stopping for a big production number.

Rees specifically wanted characters to be able to break out into song whenever they wanted to, similar to the films of the Hollywood Golden Age. Once they were written, Newman used the songs in his own score. For example, the first song in the film, "City of Light", displays the character's naivety and apprehension, and contains a motif that gets more complex as the film goes on. This approach made the score more cohesive. "It's a B-Movie" is filled with black humor and an ominous pipe organ as the mutant appliances scare the main characters. The synthesizer driven "Cutting Edge" sees the master's state-of-the-art appliances boast about how great they are. The poignant number "Worthless" is a track filled with piano, strings, guitar, and vocals which are abruptly cut off when the singing cars are crushed. The junkyard sequence's climax evokes feelings of desperation, danger, suspense and real-world peril. Newman "reprises the score's subtle and varied themes over the end credits". Newman wrote and orchestrated the score over a 50-hour period, which included embarking on a 12-hour flight to Japan to record with the orchestra in Maeda Hall.

The New Japan Philharmonic gave the score a "luxurious sound" that was impressive given the limited resources available. The sound effects were not from a library, and were instead, exclusively made Foley sounds, with various real-world objects around Los Angeles being used in the score, such as objects in antique stores. This technique was used because Rees wanted to create new characters with new sounds. The sound mixers, including former Disney studio mixer Shawn Murphy who recorded the score, asked how they would do their job due to the film being animated, and Rees explained that they should mix it like any other film, instead of thinking of it like it were a cartoon.

== Music ==
The Brave Little Toaster

Soundtrack album by David Newman, Van Dyke Parks, and the New Japan Philharmonic
- Released: 2005
- Recorded: 1987
- Label: Percepto

David Newman's score for The Brave Little Toaster was his first for an animated work; Van Dyke Parks wrote the songs' music and lyrics. In most of the songs, Beth Anderson, Janice Liebhart, and Darryl Phinnessee perform the singing voices of various background characters, while also doubling as the chorus. In addition, the songs "Tutti Frutti" and "My Mammy" are played by the character Radio during the film.

The Orlando Sentinel's Jay Boyar wrote in October 1989: "The songs (by Van Dyke Parks)...are clever. The best of a very good batch is 'Cutting Edge', a Talking Heads-for-kids-style ditty in which a gang of high-tech gadgets amazes and frightens Toaster's band with some electronic prowess". Thomas Glorieux gave the soundtrack three stars in a c. 2000s review.

=== Songs ===
Original songs performed in the film include:

No.	Title	Performer(s)	Length
1.	"City of Light"	Deanna Oliver, Timothy E. Day, Timothy Stack, Thurl Ravenscroft & Jerry Rees
2.	"It's a B-Movie"	Phil Hartman, Deanna Oliver, Timothy E. Day, Timothy Stack, Thurl Ravenscroft, Jerry Rees & Chorus
3.	"Cutting Edge"	Jim Jackman, Susie Allanson & Chorus
4.	"Worthless"	Chorus

== Themes ==
Director Jerry Rees described the main message the film as: "what would it be like to be an appliance, and feel good when you're useful, and help people..."? He also explained that the film's themes included a "fear of being abandoned and wanting to be reunited with somebody that you love..."—the opposing forces of feeling like you're worthless and the joy of redemption". Another important notion was that of "valuing things from the past and taking them...into the future", both in terms of objects and relationships.

All of the main characters have personalities that are unique twists on the appliance functionality. Blanky is an electric security blanket but is insecure without its owner, the bright Lampy is mentally dim, Kirby is supposed to hold everything inside but has a nervous breakdown, Toaster is warm and reflective so can easily empathize, and Radio is constantly switched on and entertaining. He has the philosophy that despite being inanimate, they each symbolized things that humans actually feel. As the foundation for writing the story, Rees reasoned that the characters would only be happy if they were being used by the Master. As a result of this, a major aspect of the film is about inanimate objects becoming alive when someone is not observing them.

As opposed to other films of the time, The Brave Little Toaster was able to include dark, scary, edgy, or risqué content due to being an independent feature. The filmmakers were able to explore the "wouldn't it be fun if" places that Disney would not allow. They rejected the false dilemma of being joke-driven or overly sincere, and instead incorporated both elements as that is how real conversations work.

== Release and home media ==
=== United States ===
The film's premiere was at Wadsworth Theatre in Los Angeles on July 10, 1987. With the producer's help, the film premiered in various festivals, including the Los Angeles International Animation Celebration in 1987, and the Sundance Film Festival in 1988. It made history as the first original animated film ever exhibited at Sundance (Faith Hubley's The Cosmic Eye, a compilation film featuring several shorts she made with spouse John Hubley, was screened in the 1986 festival) and remained the only one until 2001's Waking Life.

Though the prize went to Rob Nilsson's shot-on-video film Heat and Sunlight, before the awards ceremony, Rees claims he was told by the judges that they considered Toaster the best film, but they decided not to give the award to a cartoon as they considered people would not take the festival seriously afterwards. Though it is sometimes thought that the film was not released in cinemas because it failed to find a distributor, in reality arthouse film distributor Skouras Pictures took on the distributing rights for the theatrical release, and was going to do evening screenings, noting it was more for college students and young adults than children.

However, Disney, who had invested in the video and television rights, according to Rees did not want competition so moved their television premiere date up and ended up preventing it from being financially successful in theatres, forcing Skouras to withdraw their deal. The film premiered on the Disney Channel on February 27, 1988. To compensate, Hyperion continued its plan to enter the film into various festivals and managed to secure limited theatrical airings at arthouse facilities across the United States, such as spending two weeks at New York's Film Forum in May 1989, and shortly in Washington, D.C., in March 1990.

Rees thinks most people discovered the film through syndication on the Disney Channel, or through home video releases. In July 1991, Walt Disney Home Video released the film to home video format via VHS and LaserDisc. A DVD was released in 2003; like most budget Disney releases from the time, the DVD uses the transfer from the LaserDisc release.

While the sequels, The Brave Little Toaster to the Rescue (1997) and The Brave Little Toaster Goes to Mars (1998), are available, the original film had yet to appear on Disney+ or any video on demand services until it was released on Disney+ on May 25, 2026. An unofficial 4K transfer of one of the film's 35mm prints, sanctioned by Jerry Rees and Brian McEntee, was uploaded to YouTube on July 13, 2023.

=== International ===
International sales rights to the film were handled by ITC Entertainment (except in Japan, which was also handled by Disney). ITC began syndicating the film starting with the ATPE 1991 TV trade show.

In the UK, the VHS tapes were released under PolyGram Video (1990s) and Carlton Video (2000s), while in Australia, Roadshow Home Video held the rights.

In Spain, Divisa Home Video and Aurum Producciones were in charge of distribution, the former during the 2000s.

In September 2003, Prism Leisure, under license from Carlton Communications (the then-owners of ITC Entertainment's library), released the film on DVD in the UK to tie in with its 15th anniversary. This DVD release, compared to the US Disney version, uses a brand new remastered transfer sourced from an international print. Their license has since expired, but the disc can still be found on UK shopping sites.

== Reception and legacy ==
The film has garnered a 79% rating on the reviews website Rotten Tomatoes based on 14 reviews, with a weighted average of 7.31/10. Mary Houlihan-Skilton of the Chicago Sun-Times gave a positive review, but found a problem with the storytellers using caricatures of Bette Davis, Peter Lorre, Jack Nicholson, Mae West, Joan Rivers and others to portray them, feeling that became "so old that it has been used forever and should be given a rest".

The Washington Post called it "a kid's film made without condescension", while The New York Times said that the film visually "has a smooth-flowing momentum and a lush storybook opulence". Time Out said the film had "a winning combination of inventive characters, amusing dialogue, excellent voice-overs, likeable tune and first-rate animation". Deseret News wrote it is "a wonder of the movie industry...a funny, occasionally thrilling animated feature aimed at kids, but with a sophisticated sensibility intended to reach their parents as well". Halliwell's Film Guide called it an "odd fantasy of pots and pans with no more than adequate animation".

Projection Booth, Film Freak Central, Arizona Daily Star, and Leonard Maltin all gave the film similar praise, describing it as "among the finest animated films Disney never made", "Blade Runner for children", "an overlooked classic [and] utterly rewatchable fable", and "a real breath of fresh air in contemporary cartoons" respectively. Needcoffee.com gave the film a 4/5, writing that despite the film having a questionable premise, "it's an actually cute and extremely fun animated flick". The Las Vegas Review-Journal, Movie Mom at Yahoo! Movies, and eFilmCritic.com all gave the same score, the latter describing it as a "perfectly charming kid's flick about adventuring appliances". Northwest Herald gave a 3/5, EmanuelLevy.Com and Talking Pictures gave a 2/5 rating.

This film is unique in that it attracted a substantial amount of talent from both old and new sources. Many of the cast and crew members went on to have successful careers in the animation industry. Co-writer Joe Ranft became a script supervisor at Pixar, while animators Kirk Wise and Kevin Lima went on to animate and co-direct films of the Disney Renaissance, such as The Little Mermaid (1989), Beauty and the Beast (1991), Aladdin (1992), Pocahontas (1995), The Hunchback of Notre Dame (1996) and Tarzan (1999). Effects animator Mark Dindal directed Disney's The Emperor's New Groove (2000) and Chicken Little (2005), as well as Warner Bros.' Cats Don't Dance (1997) and Sony Pictures' The Garfield Movie (2024). Character designer Rob Minkoff directed The Lion King (1994), Stuart Little (1999), Stuart Little 2 (2002), Mr. Peabody & Sherman (2014) and Paws of Fury: The Legend of Hank (2022). After directing the financially unsuccessful film The Marrying Man in 1991, Jerry Rees went on to direct numerous multimedia productions at Disney's theme parks. Voice actors Jon Lovitz and Phil Hartman wound their way onto animated series such as The Simpsons and The Critic. Many have noted that this film shares similarities to the Toy Story franchise, also worked on by John Lasseter. Rees saw it as "the next inanimate object feature".

Despite its limited release, the cult following of the film has seen the cast and crew get substantial recognition throughout the world. Rees recalled a situation where a person he was doing an online project with messaged him on IMDb, discovering his work on The Brave Little Toaster, and explained how deeply the film affected him due to teaching life lessons. He appreciated this genuine reaction from a real person. Oliver went to the Afghanistan deployment ceremony for her son in June 2010, and he had told Brave Company his mother played Toaster, so they brought toasters with them for her to sign, which the soldiers took to the country with them. She also received fan art from one of the soldiers. The consensus among people who worked on the film such as Tom Wilhite and Donald Kushner is that the original is the one that has the cult following as opposed to the sequels. Rees said that when his future Pixar friends saw the film, they appreciated it despite the animation due to the heavy financial and time constraints.

=== Sequels ===
The Brave Little Toaster was followed by two sequels a decade later: The Brave Little Toaster to the Rescue (1997) and The Brave Little Toaster Goes to Mars (1998). The latter (Mars) is based on the sequel to Disch's novella while the former (Rescue) is a brand new story. While reuniting most of the cast and producers, they had a different director in Robert C. Ramirez and new crew members. Rees noted that the original film was made out of pure love and not thought of as a kids' film or a product, and that he had heard the new approach was a more commercial venture. Deanna Oliver felt that despite Ramirez being a talented director who handled the franchise with care, instead of "film" and "character-driven", the project seemed more about getting it done because it could be made. Neither Rees nor Oliver have admitted to watching the finished sequels.

==== Cancelled fourth film and live action/computer-generated remake ====
In 2006, the official website of Hyperion Pictures posted an image of a possible fourth film in CGI, but that film was never produced. The website was inactive for years before being re-updated in 2019. Waterman Entertainment planned a live action/computer-generated remake, but it was never produced.

=== Awards and nominations ===
Year	Nominee / work	Award	Result
1987	The Brave Little Toaster	Animated Works Over 30 Minutes	Won
1988	Peter Locke, Willard Carroll, Donald Kushner, Thomas L. Wilhite, Jerry Rees and Joe Ranft	Primetime Emmy Award for Outstanding Animated Program	Nominated
1988	Jerry Rees	Sundance Film Festival Grand Jury Prize, Dramatic	Nominated
1988	The Brave Little Toaster	Special Jury Recognition	Won
1988	The Brave Little Toaster	Parent's Choice Award	Won

== See also ==
- Luxo Jr.
- Toy Story
- Toy Story 2
- Tin Toy
- Arthouse animation
