= Jerry Rees =

American film director and animator (born 1956)

- Born: Jerry W. Rees; November 15, 1956 (age 69); Johnson County, Texas, U.S.
- Education: California Institute of the Arts (CalArts)
- Occupations: Film director; screenwriter; animator; film producer
- Years active: 1978–present
- Website: jerryrees.com

Jerry W. Rees (born November 15, 1956) is an American film director and animator, best known for the Emmy-nominated animated feature film The Brave Little Toaster (1987) and creating many of the visual effects for Tron (1982).

== Early life ==
Rees was mentored as an animator from the age of 16 at Disney Studios by Eric Larson, one of Walt Disney's Nine Old Men, and was trained and taught at California Institute of the Arts (CalArts), along with classmates John Lasseter, Brad Bird, John Musker, Tim Burton and Doug Lefler.

== Career ==
In 1978, Rees worked as an animator for the Christmas children's film The Small One. He also worked on the Disney film The Fox and the Hound (1981), and the following year served as one of the visual effects supervisors for the cutting-edge science fiction film Tron.

In 1987, Rees and science fiction writer Thomas M. Disch collaborated on adapting Disch's short story The Brave Little Toaster into an animated film. The resulting film was nominated for a Grand Jury Prize at the Sundance Film Festival and nominated for Outstanding Animated Program at the 1988 Primetime Emmy Awards. He also teamed up with fellow CalArts alum Tim Burton to co-write and co-direct the cult classic featurettes Doctor of Doom and Luau.

Rees directed the Neil Simon-penned The Marrying Man (1991) and served as an animation producer on the film Space Jam (1996).

In 1993, Rees wrote and produced (with Steven Paul Leiva) a new Betty Boop feature film for Metro-Goldwyn-Mayer. Seventy-five percent of the film was storyboarded, but two weeks before voice recording was to begin, MGM switched studio chiefs and the project, tentatively called The Betty Boop Feature Script, was abandoned.

In addition to his film credits, Rees helped produce and direct a record-setting 13 multimedia features at the various Disney theme parks, including the Indiana Jones Epic Stunt Spectacular! and Sounds Dangerous! at Disney–MGM Studios, Cranium Command and O Canada! at Epcot, Extraterrorestrial Alien Encounter at Magic Kingdom, the ride preshow film of Dinosaur at Disney's Animal Kingdom, Rock 'n' Roller Coaster Starring Aerosmith at Disney–MGM Studios and Walt Disney Studios Park, CinéMagique at Walt Disney Studios Park, and Mystic Manor at Hong Kong Disneyland. Rees also directed the Tourist from Hell, The Editing Story, and Michael & Mickey short films, as well as the Back to Neverland short film starring Robin Williams and Walter Cronkite which were all screened as part of the backstage tour at Disney–MGM Studios.

For some time, Rees was attached as director to a project called Rand Robinson, Robot Repairman, financed by Interscope and Philips. The film was set in a futuristic Los Angeles, and Philips expected to use the film to showcase their emerging technology. Rees storyboarded various scenes in the film, but eventually several key players left the project, and it was shelved.

In 2010, Rees and actress and writer Deanna Oliver made an appearance at California State University, Northridge to discuss the making of their film The Brave Little Toaster.

Currently, Rees is a full-time creative consultant at the San Francisco film studio Wild Brain, where he is developing CGI features. Rees is also attached to direct a Casey Silver Productions CGI feature.

== Filmography ==
=== Feature films ===
Year	Title	Director	Writer	Animation department	Notes
1977	Pete's Dragon			Yes	Character animator
1980	Animalympics			Yes	Character animator
1981	The Fox and the Hound			Yes	Character animator
1982	Tron			Yes	Production storyboards / Computer image choreography
1985	The Black Cauldron			Yes	Character animator (uncredited)
1987	The Brave Little Toaster	Yes	Yes	Yes	Storyboard artist / Voice role: Radio (singing only)
1991	The Marrying Man	Yes			
1996	Space Jam			Yes	Animation producer
2003	Little Alvin and the Mini-Munks	Yes			Direct-to-video/ Special effects animator/ Voice roles: Sam / Lou
2013	Susie's Hope	Yes	Yes		Direct-to-video

=== Short films ===
Year	Title	Director	Writer	Animation department	Notes
1978	The Small One			Yes	Character animator
1979	Doctor of Doom	Yes			Editor / Cinematographer/ Voice role: Bob Garcia
1982	Luau	Yes	Yes		Producer
1983	Winnie the Pooh and a Day for Eeyore			Yes	Character animator
1983	Mickey's Christmas Carol			Yes	Character animator
1989	Back to Neverland	Yes	Yes		Part of The Magic of Disney Animation attraction at Disney-MGM Studios.
1989	Tourist from Hell	Yes			Part of the Studio Backlot Tour attraction at Disney-MGM Studios.
1989	The Editing Story	Yes			Part of the Studio Backlot Tour attraction at Disney-MGM Studios.
1989	Michael & Mickey	Yes			Part of the Studio Backlot Tour attraction at Disney-MGM Studios.
1989	Cranium Command	Yes			Attraction
1994	Extraterrorestrial Alien Encounter	Yes			Attraction
1998	Dinosaur	Yes			Preshow film. Originally named "Countdown to Extinction"
1999	Sounds Dangerous	Yes			Attraction
1999	Rock' Roller Coaster Starring Aerosmith	Yes			Attraction
2001	Disney's California Adventure TV Special	Yes			
2002	CinéMagique	Yes			Attraction
2005	Disneyland: The First 50 Magical Years	Yes			Documentary
2014	The Marvel Experience	Yes			Media director

=== Television ===
Year	Title	Credited as	Notes
1984	Heathcliff & the Catillac Cats	Storyboard artist	65 episodes
1989	Alvin and the Chipmunks	Writer	Episode "Cookie Chomper III"
