= Jonathan Benair =

American actor

- Born: July 4, 1950; Los Angeles, California, U.S.
- Died: June 29, 1998 (aged 47); Van Nuys, Los Angeles, California, U.S.
- Occupations: Actor; screenwriter; film projector; scheduler
- Years active: 1987–1998

Jonathan Benair (July 4, 1950 – June 29, 1998) was an American actor who did the voice of the Black and White TV in the animated film The Brave Little Toaster and Jim Bob in The Brave Little Toaster to the Rescue, the latter of which was released posthumously.

== Early life ==
Jonathan Benair was born on July 4, 1950, in Los Angeles, the son of Zvi Benair and Muriel (née Dubov). Benair had one brother, Daniel.

== Career ==
Benair did very few acting roles and had an independent career. He had played roles in Hollywood Game, The Brave Little Toaster and The Brave Little Toaster to the Rescue, his final acting role. Benair was also a screenwriter, having sold three movie scripts, and contributed articles to Movieline, the Los Angeles Reader and L.A. Style.

He worked as a film programmer for the Los Angeles County of Museum Art for eight years during the 1970s and 1980s, and was a member of the Writers Guild of America and the British Academy of Film and Television Arts. An amateur film historian, Benair would talk frequently at film festivals, offering his knowledge of cinema to writers who wanted his assistance.

== Death ==
On June 28, 1998, Benair died of a cerebral hemorrhage and heart attack in Van Nuys, California at age 47, six days shy of his 48th birthday.

== Filmography ==
=== Film ===
Year	Title	Role	Notes
1987	The Brave Little Toaster	Black and White TV (voice)	
1988	Who Framed Roger Rabbit	Bullet #3 (voice)	Uncredited
1993	The Very Hungry Caterpillar & Other Stories		Animator
1993	The Thief and the Cobbler		Animator
1995	Toy Story	Troops (voice)	Uncredited
1997	The Brave Little Toaster to the Rescue	Jim Bob (voice)	Direct-to-video
1997	Annabelle's Wish	Ducks (voice)	Direct-to-video
1998	T.R.A.N.S.I.T.		Short film
