= Gooseneck lamp =

Type of desk lamp usually used for reading

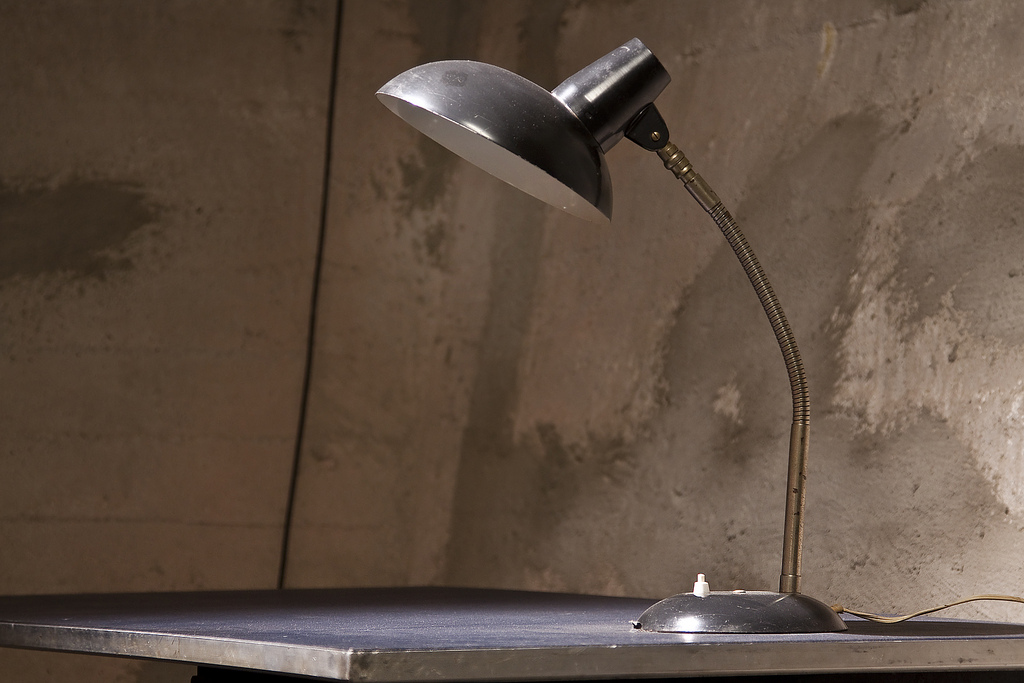
A gooseneck lamp

A gooseneck lamp is a type of light fixture in which a lamp or lightbulb is attached to a flexible, adjustable shaft known as a "gooseneck" to allow the user to position the light source without moving the fixture or item to be illuminated. Gooseneck lamps are often used to position a light for reading, or in industry, to provide spot illumination for machining operations. These lamps can come in any color. Gooseneck lamps may be free standing floor lamps, desk lamps, or have magnetic bases in industrial applications.

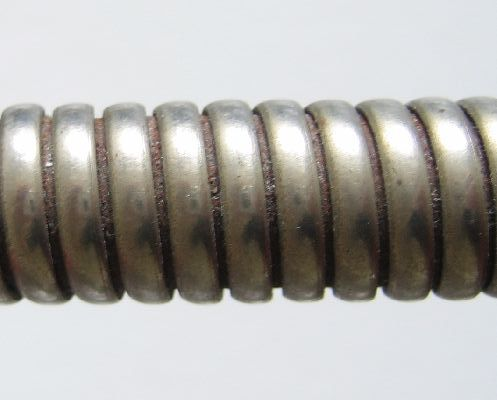
Detail of gooseneck lamp

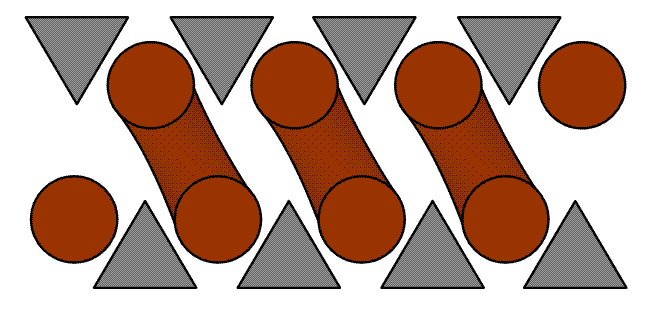
Schematic diagram

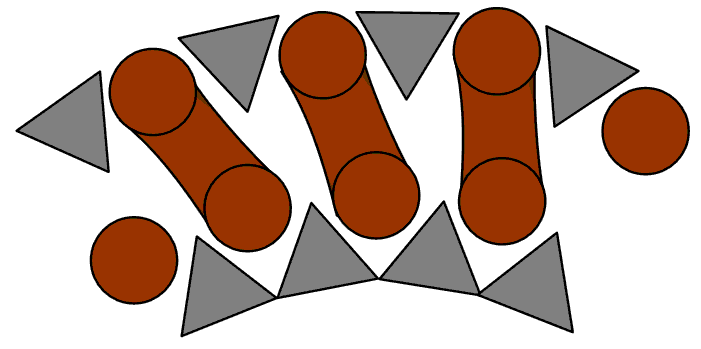
Schematic diagram (bent)

== See also ==
- Balanced-arm lamp
